= 2021–22 Super League Greece 2 =

Super League Greece 2
- Season: 2021–22
- Dates: 6 November 2021 - 1 May 2022
- Champions: Levadiakos
- Promoted: Levadiakos
- Relegated: Xanthi; Pierikos; Kavala; Olympiacos Volos; Trikala Ergotelis; Asteras Vlachioti; Karaiskakis; Rodos; Zakynthos
- Matches: 538
- Goals: 1,229 (2.28 per match)
- Top goalscorer: Giannis Pasas (24 goals)
- Biggest home win: Pierikos 7–0 Kavala (21 November 2021); Thesprotos 7–0 Kavala (28 November 2021); Niki Volos 7–0 Kavala (16 December 2021); Apollon Pontus 7–0 Kavala (22 December 2021)
- Biggest away win: Kavala 0–6 Xanthi (24 November 2021); Kavala 0–6 Almopos Aridea (11 December 2021); Trikala 0–6 PAOK B (16 April 2022)
- Highest scoring: Pierikos 7–0 Kavala (21 November 2021); Thesprotos 7–0 Kavala (28 November 2021); Niki Volos 7–0 Kavala (16 December 2021); Apollon Pontus 7–0 Kavala (22 December 2021); Xanthi 5–2 Anagennisi Karditsa (2 February 2022); Anagennisi Karditsa 5–2 Veria (2 March 2022)
- Longest winning run: 8 - Veria (16 January 2022 - 2 March 2022)
- Longest unbeaten run: 22 - AEL (24 November 2021 - 30 March 2022)
- Longest winless run: 13 - Zakynthos (13 November 2021 - 26 January 2022); 13 - Trikala (6 March 2022 - 1 May 2022)
- Longest losing run: 7 - Kavala (21 November 2021 - 12 January 2022); 7 - Zakynthos (19 December 2021 - 26 January 2022)
- All statistics correct as of 1 May 2022.

The 2021–22 Super League 2, known as Super League 2 betsson for sponsorship reasons, is the third season of the Super League 2, the second-tier Greek professional league for association football clubs, since the restructuring of the Greek football league system.

The season started on 6 November 2021 and ended in May 2022. The league will be conducted of 34 teams and two groups, this is due to the restructure and abolishment of the Football League. The league will also see the introduction of B Teams by Olympiacos, PAOK, AEK Athens and Panathinaikos. B Teams are ineligible for promotion and relegation.

== Team changes ==
The following teams have changed division since the 2020–21 season.

Panachaiki, Ialysos, Santorini 2020, Orfeas Xanthi, Doxa Drama, Panionios, withdrew from the championship.

=== From Super League Greece 2 ===
Promoted to Super League

- Ionikos

Relegated to Gamma Ethniki

- Panachaiki
- Doxa Drama

=== To Super League Greece 2 ===
Relegated from Super League

- AEL

Promoted from Football League

- Almopos Aridea
- Apollon Pontus
- Asteras Vlachioti
- Egaleo
- Episkopi
- Iraklis (replace Triglia)
- Kalamata
- Kallithea
- Kavala
- Niki Volos
- Olympiacos Volos
- Panserraikos
- Rodos
- Thesprotos
- Veria

Promoted from Gamma Ethniki

- A.E. Kifisia
- Anagennisi Karditsa
- Irodotos
- Zakynthos

B Teams

- Olympiacos B
- PAOK B
- AEK Athens B
- Panathinaikos B

== North Group ==
=== Teams ===
Locations the 2021–22 Super League 2 North Group clubs

Team	City	Stadium	Capacity
AEL	Larisa	Alcazar Stadium	13,108
Almopos Aridea	Aridaia	Aridea Municipal Stadium	700
Anagennisi Karditsa	Karditsa	Municipal Stadium Karditsa	3,500
Apollon Larissa	Larisa	Filippoupoli Stadium	5,000
Apollon Pontus	Thessaloniki	Kalamaria Stadium	6,500
Iraklis	Thessaloniki	Kaftanzoglio Stadium	27,770
Kavala	Kavala	Anthi Karagianni Stadium	10,550
Niki Volos	Volos	Panthessaliko Stadium	22,700
Olympiacos B	Piraeus	Tavros Stadium	4,000
Olympiacos Volos	Volos	Neapoli Volos Municipal Stadium	2,500
Panserraikos	Serres	Serres Municipal Stadium	9,500
PAOK B	Thessaloniki	Makedonikos Stadium	8,100
Pierikos	Katerini	Katerini Municipal Stadium	4,995
Thesprotos	Igoumenitsa	Municipal Stadium Igoumenitsa	3,500
Trikala	Trikala	Trikala Municipal Stadium	15,000
Veria	Veria	Veria Stadium	7,000
Xanthi	Xanthi	Xanthi FC Arena	7,244

=== Personnel and sponsoring ===
Team	Manager	Captain	Kit manufacturer	Sponsor
AEL	(Greece) Sotiris Antoniou	(Greece) Manolis Bertos	Legea	Thrakis Gefseis
Almopos Aridea	(Greece) Georgios Tyriakidis	(Greece) Rafail Pettas	Errea	Loutra Pozar
Anagennisi Karditsa	(Greece) Periklis Amanatidis	(Greece) Nikos Golias	Nike	N/A
Apollon Larissa	(Greece) Thomas Grafas	(Greece) Konstantinos Chatzis	Givova	Psaragores Thalassa
Apollon Pontus	(Greece) Dimitris Kalaitzidis	(Greece) Dimitrios Amarantidis	Nike	N/A
Iraklis	(Greece) Kostas Georgiadis	(Greece) Manolis Papasterianos	Joma	N/A
Kavala	(Greece) Panagiotis Dilberis	(Greece) Giannis Kazantzidis	Macron	Ellagrolip
Niki Volos	(Greece) Alekos Vosniadis	(Greece) Manolis Apostolidis	Macron	Car.gr
Olympiacos B	(Argentina) Ariel Ibagaza	(Greece) Giorgos Xenitidis	Adidas	Stoiximan
Olympiacos Volos	(Greece) Timos Kavakas	(Greece) Filippos Skopelitis	Nike	Mr. Pengu
Panserraikos	(Greece) Giannis Giokas	(Greece) Dimitris Anakoglou	Macron	Spyropoulos
PAOK B	(Uruguay) Pablo García	(Greece) Zisis Chatzistravos	Macron	Stoiximan
Pierikos	(Greece) Georgios Vazakas	(Greece) Konstantinos Demirtzoglou	Macron	N/A
Thesprotos	(Argentina) Juan Ramón Rocha	(Greece) Charilaos Bikas	Nike	Car.gr
Trikala	(Greece) Vasilis Kalogannis	(Greece) Christos Niaros	Givova	LeChat
Veria	(Greece) Pavlos Dermitzakis	(Greece) Stelios Marangos	Nike	DaCristo
Xanthi	(Greece) Konstantinos Anyfantakis	(Greece) Anastasios Papazoglou	Joma	N/A

=== Managerial changes ===
Team	Outgoing manager	Manner of departure	Date of vacancy	Position in table	Incoming manager	Date of appointment
Olympiacos B	—N/a	—N/a	—N/a	Pre-season	(Argentina) Ariel Ibagaza	12 June 2021
PAOK B	—N/a	—N/a	—N/a	Pre-season	(Uruguay) Pablo Garcia	19 July 2021
Trikala	(England) David Magrone	Resigned	12 August 2021	Pre-season	(Greece) Leonidas Bilis	13 August 2021
AEL	(Greece) Michalis Ziogas (caretaker)	End of tenure as caretaker	23 May 2021	Pre-season	(Greece) Kostas Frantzeskos	24 May 2021
Apollon Larissa	(Greece) Kostas Frantzeskos	Resigned	23 May 2021	Pre-season	(Argentina) Marcelo Straccia	1 June 2021
Xanthi	(Greece) Babis Tennes	Resigned	30 May 2021	Pre-season	(Portugal) Jaime Monroy	8 July 2021
Olympiacos Volos	(Greece) Vasilis Vouzas	Resigned	13 July 2021	Pre-season	(Greece) Georgios Vazakas	13 July 2021
Iraklis	(Greece) Thalis Theodoridis (caretaker)	End of tenure as caretaker	2 August 2021	Pre-season	(Greece) Kostas Georgiadis	2 August 2021
Panserraikos	(Greece) Giannis Giokas (caretaker)	End of tenure as caretaker	2 August 2021	Pre-season	(Spain) Gerard Zaragoza	2 August 2021
Anagennisi Karditsa	(Greece) Alexandros Kourtoglou	Resigned	15 July 2021	Pre-season	(Greece) Periklis Amanatidis	18 July 2021
Trikala	(Greece) Leonidas Bilis	Sacked	16 September 2021	Pre-season	(Greece) Timos Kavakas	16 September 2021
AEL	(Greece) Kostas Frantzeskos	Sacked	13 October 2021	Pre-season	(Greece) Ilias Fyntanis	14 October 2021
Trikala	(Greece) Timos Kavakas	Sacked	8 November 2021	5th	(Paraguay) Jorge Abente	10 November 2021
Xanthi	(Portugal) Jaime Monroy	Sacked	12 November 2021	9th	(Greece) Nikos Kehagias	12 November 2021
Olympiacos Volos	(Greece) Georgios Vazakas	Sacked	24 November 2021	8th	(Spain) Manu Calleja	25 November 2021
Apollon Larissa	(Argentina) Marcelo Straccia	Sacked	16 December 2021	16th	(Greece) Thomas Grafas	17 December 2021
AEL	(Greece) Ilias Fyntanis	Sacked	23 December 2021	6th	(Greece) Panagiotis Goutsidis	23 December 2021
Trikala	(Paraguay) Jorge Abente	Sacked	24 December 2021	10th	(Greece) Nikos Oustabasidis	24 December 2021
Kavala	(Greece) Nikos Karabiberis	End of contract	31 December 2021	17th	(Germany) Alexander Nouri	1 January 2022
Olympiacos Volos	(Spain) Manu Calleja	Sacked	1 January 2022	14th	(Greece) Vasilis Vouzas	1 January 2022
Panserraikos	(Spain) Gerard Zaragoza	Sacked	2 January 2022	15th	(Greece) Angelos Digozis	2 January 2022
Pierikos	(Greece) Nikos Theodosiadis	Sacked	16 January 2022	13th	(Greece) Georgios Vazakas	17 January 2022
Xanthi	(Greece) Nikos Kehagias	Resigned	28 January 2022	3rd	(Greece) Kostas Michailidis (caretaker)	28 January 2022
Xanthi	(Greece) Kostas Michailidis (caretaker)	End of tenure as caretaker	1 February 2022	3rd	(Croatia) Zoran Vulić	1 February 2022
Trikala	(Greece) Nikos Oustabasidis	Resigned	7 February 2022	10th	(Greece) Timos Kavakas	9 February 2022
Trikala	(Greece) Timos Kavakas	Resigned	22 February 2022	14th	(Greece) Vasilis Kalogannis (caretaker)	22 February 2022
Xanthi	(Croatia) Zoran Vulić	Sacked	4 March 2022	4th	(Greece) Konstantinos Anyfantakis	8 March 2022
Olympiacos Volos	(Greece) Vasilis Vouzas	Sacked	6 March 2022	16th	(Greece) Timos Kavakas	7 March 2022
Kavala	(Germany) Alexander Nouri	Resigned	26 March 2022	17th	(Greece) Georgios Angelidis (caretaker)	26 March 2022
Kavala	(Greece) Georgios Angelidis (caretaker)	End of tenure as caretaker	28 March 2022	17th	(Greece) Nikos Karabiberis (caretaker)	28 March 2022
Kavala	(Greece) Nikos Karabiberis (caretaker)	End of tenure as caretaker	6 April 2022	15th	(Greece) Panagiotis Dilberis (caretaker)	6 April 2022
Panserraikos	(Greece) Angelos Digozis	Resigned	14 April 2022	14th	(Greece) Giannis Giokas (caretaker)	14 April 2022
AEL	(Greece) Panagiotis Goutsidis	Resigned	28 April 2022	2nd	(Greece) Sotiris Antoniou	3 May 2022

=== League table ===
Pos	Team	Pld	W	D	L	GF	GA	GD	Pts	Promotion, qualification or relegation (Note: Olympiacos B and PAOK B are ineligible for promotion and relegation)
1	Veria (Q)	32	23	6	3	61	23	+38	75	Qualification for the Title and Promotion play-offs
2	AEL	32	19	10	3	42	15	+27	67	
3	Xanthi (Note: Xanthi was relegated to local championships because of financial problems.) (R)	32	13	14	5	43	25	+18	53	Relegation to Local Championships
4	Niki Volos	32	14	10	8	38	20	+18	52	
5	Anagennisi Karditsa	32	15	6	11	47	34	+13	51	
6	Olympiacos B	32	14	9	9	40	31	+9	51	
7	Iraklis	32	11	15	6	51	29	+22	48	
8	PAOK B	32	11	11	10	41	32	+9	44	
9	Almopos Aridea	32	10	9	13	40	39	+1	39	
10	Apollon Pontus	32	9	10	13	34	38	−4	37	
11	Apollon Larissa	32	8	11	13	27	42	−15	35	
12	Thesprotos	32	8	10	14	34	43	−9	34	
13	Panserraikos	32	7	12	13	31	39	−8	33	
14	Pierikos (R)	32	7	11	14	36	49	−13	32	Relegation to Gamma Ethniki
15	Kavala (R)	32	7	10	15	25	71	−46	31	Relegation to Gamma Ethniki
16	Olympiacos Volos (R)	32	7	8	17	34	49	−15	29	Relegation to Gamma Ethniki
17	Trikala (R)	32	5	6	21	17	62	−45	21	Relegation to Gamma Ethniki

Source: sl2.gr
Rules for classification: 1) Points; 2) Head-to-head points; 3) Head-to-head goal difference; 4) Goals scored; 5) Goals against; 6) Play-offs (neutral ground, only used if needed to decide teams for promotion or relegation).
(Q) Qualified for the phase indicated; (R) Relegated

=== Results ===
Home \ Away	AEL	ALM	ANK	APL	APP	IRA	KAV	NKV	OLB	OLV	PNS	PKB	PIE	THE	TRI	VER	XNT
AEL	—	2–1	0–0	2–0	0–0	3–0	3–0	1–0	2–1	0–0	2–0	0–0	1–0	1–0	3–0	1–1	4–0
Almopos Aridea	0–1	—	1–0	2–2	2–0	0–2	1–1	0–0	3–0	0–0	0–1	1–2	3–1	1–0	3–0	1–2	2–2
Anagennisi Karditsa	2–3	4–0	—	1–0	2–1	0–3	1–0	0–0	0–1	4–0	1–0	1–0	2–0	1–0	4–2	5–2	4–0
Apollon Larissa	0–2	1–1	2–1	—	0–2	0–1	0–1	1–0	2–2	1–1	1–0	2–1	0–0	2–1	3–3	0–1	0–0
Apollon Pontus	1–3	1–1	1–1	1–1	—	1–1	7–0	0–0	0–0	1–0	1–0	0–3	1–0	0–0	3–0	0–0	0–0
Iraklis	1–1	6–0	1–1	4–0	0–3	—	1–2	0–0	0–0	4–0	1–1	0–0	4–2	6–0	0–1	1–0	1–0
Kavala	0–1	0–6	3–1	0–0	3–0	1–1	—	0–2	0–0	0–5	2–2	1–1	1–2	1–1	1–0	0–2	0–6
Niki Volos	1–1	1–0	1–0	0–2	1–0	1–1	7–0	—	0–1	1–0	1–0	2–1	2–0	3–1	3–0	2–2	0–1
Olympiacos B	1–0	2–1	0–1	0–1	2–0	0–0	2–2	2–0	—	3–2	2–1	3–1	3–0	4–0	2–0	1–1	1–1
Olympiacos Volos	1–2	1–1	0–1	2–1	3–2	1–1	0–2	1–2	2–3	—	1–2	3–1	0–1	0–1	2–0	0–2	1–0
Panserraikos	0–1	1–3	2–1	1–0	2–4	2–0	2–0	0–0	4–0	2–2	—	1–2	1–1	2–2	1–1	0–1	0–0
PAOK B	2–0	0–1	2–1	3–0	2–1	0–0	1–1	2–2	1–0	2–1	1–1	—	1–1	0–0	3–0	1–2	0–1
Pierikos	0–0	2–2	2–2	3–2	1–0	2–2	7–0	0–3	1–2	2–2	1–1	0–0	—	0–3	3–0	2–1	1–1
Thesprotos	0–0	0–3	0–0	1–1	1–2	1–5	7–0	2–0	2–1	1–1	3–0	1–1	1–0	—	2–0	1–3	0–0
Trikala	0–1	1–0	0–3	0–1	2–0	0–0	0–2	0–3	0–0	1–2	1–1	0–6	1–0	2–1	—	1–2	1–1
Veria	1–1	1–0	2–0	5–1	5–0	3–1	2–1	1–0	1–0	3–0	3–0	2–1	4–1	2–1	1–0	—	0–0
Xanthi	2–0	2–0	5–2	0–0	2–1	3–3	0–0	0–0	2–1	2–0	0–0	3–0	3–0	1–0	5–0	0–3	—

Source: sl2.gr
Legend: Blue = home team win; Yellow = draw; Red = away team win.
For upcoming matches, an "a" indicates there is an article about the rivalry between the two participants.

== South Group ==
=== Teams ===
Locations the 2021–22 Super League 2 South Group clubs

Team	City	Stadium	Capacity
AEK Athens B	Spata	Spata Training Centre	3,000
A.E. Kifisia	Kifissia	Municipal Kifisia Stadium	1,050
Asteras Vlachioti	Vlachiotis	Vlachiotis Municipal Stadium	600
Chania	Chania	Perivolia Municipal Stadium	4,527
Diagoras	Rhodes	Diagoras Stadium	3,700
Egaleo	Aigaleo	Stavros Mavrothalassitis Stadium	8,217
Episkopi	Lappa	Gallos Stadium	1,500
Ergotelis	Heraklion	Pankritio Stadium	26,240
O.F. Ierapetra	Ierapetra	Ierapetra Municipal Stadium	3,000
Irodotos	Heraklion	Municipal Nea Alikarnassos Stadium	3,000
Kalamata	Kalamata	Kalamata Municipal Stadium	5,613
Kallithea	Kallithea	Grigoris Lambrakis Stadium	6,300
Karaiskakis	Arta	Municipal Agioi Anargiroi Stadium	1,900
Levadiakos	Livadeia	Levadia Municipal Stadium	5,915
Panathinaikos B	Athens	Grigoris Lambrakis Stadium	6,300
Rodos	Rhodes	Diagoras Stadium	3,693
Zakynthos	Zakynthos	Zakynthians Olympic Champions Ground	2,000

=== Personnel and sponsoring ===
Team	Manager	Captain	Kit manufacturer	Sponsor
AEK Athens B	(Greece) Nikos Panagiotaras	(Greece) Christos Giousis	Nike	OPAP
A.E. Kifisia	(Greece) Dimitrios Eleftheropoulos	(Greece) Vangelis Gotovos	Macron	Peugeot Besikos
Asteras Vlachioti	(Greece) Ilias Fyntanis	(Greece) Markos Dounis	Zeus	N/A
Chania	(Greece) Nikos Papadopoulos	(Greece) Kostas Panagiotoudis	Saller	Mare Magnum
Diagoras	(Greece) Giannis Providas	(Greece) Konstantinos Rougalas	Nike	Bread Factory
Egaleo	(Greece) Apostolos Charalampidis	(Greece) Ilias Tsiligiris	Macron	Kyriakoulis
Episkopi	(Bosnia and Herzegovina) Jasminko Velić	(Greece) Dimitris Polychronis	Lotto	Avin
Ergotelis	(Greece) Nikos Badimas	(Greece) Antonis Bourselis	Capelli	N/A
O.F. Ierapetra	(Greece) Staikos Vergetis	(Greece) Kaloudis Lemonis	Macron	N/A
Irodotos	(Greece) Vasilios Vouzas	(Greece) Manolis Roussakis	Stanno	N/A
Kalamata	(Albania) Arjan Bellaj (caretaker)	(Greece) Panagiotis Konstantinopoulos	Capelli	Volterra
Kallithea	(Greece) Leonidas Vokolos	(Greece) Mattheos Maroukakis	Zeus	N/A
Karaiskakis	(Greece) Nikos Oustabasidis	(Greece) Alexandros Bekatoros	Macron	Kotopoula Artas
Levadiakos	(Greece) Giannis Taousianis	(Honduras) Alfredo Mejía	Legea	Kompotis
Panathinaikos B	(Spain) Javier Vázquez	(Greece) Andreas Athanasakopoulos	Kappa	N/A
Rodos	(Greece) Nikos Kourbanas	(Greece) Georgios Delaportas	Nike	Mitsis Hotels
Zakynthos	(Greece) Dimitris Nolis	(Greece) Giannis Kallivokas	Nike	N/A

=== Managerial changes ===
Team	Outgoing manager	Manner of departure	Date of vacancy	Position in table	Incoming manager	Date of appointment
Panathinaikos B	—N/a	—N/a	—N/a	Pre-season	(Greece) Giannis Vonortas	25 June 2021
AEK Athens B	—N/a	—N/a	—N/a	Pre-season	(Greece) Sokratis Ofrydopoulos	16 July 2021
Levadiakos	(Greece) Sokratis Ofrydopoulos (caretaker)	End of tenure as caretaker	26 May 2021	Pre-season	(Greece) Giannis Taousianis	18 June 2021
Ergotelis	(Greece) Giannis Taousianis	Resigned	17 June 2021	Pre-season	(Greece) Nikos Badimas	24 June 2021
O.F. Ierapetra	(Greece) Timos Kavakas	Resigned	21 June 2021	Pre-season	(Greece) Staikos Vergetis	1 July 2021
Karaiskakis	(Greece) Giannis Mangos	Resigned	3 August 2021	Pre-season	(Montenegro) Dragan Đukanović	4 August 2021
Irodotos	(Greece) Manolis Skyvalos	Resigned	17 August 2021	Pre-season	(Greece) Giannis Tatsis	21 August 2021
Asteras Vlachioti	(Greece) Panagiotis Goutsidis	Resigned	23 September 2021	Pre-season	(Greece) Kostas Velitzelos	25 September 2021
Karaiskakis	(Montenegro) Dragan Đukanović	Sacked	23 December 2021	11th	(Greece) Timos Kavakas	23 December 2021
Diagoras	(Greece) Theodosis Theodosiadis	Sacked	27 December 2021	13th	(Greece) Giannis Providas	28 December 2021
Panathinaikos B	(Greece) Giannis Vonortas	Sacked	17 January 2022	9th	(Spain) Javier Vázquez	18 January 2022
A.E. Kifisia	(Greece) Nikos Koustas	Sacked	18 January 2022	10th	(Greece) Dimitrios Eleftheropoulos	20 January 2022
Karaiskakis	(Greece) Timos Kavakas	Sacked	2 February 2022	14th	(Greece) Kostas Frantzeskos	3 February 2022
Irodotos	(Greece) Giannis Tatsis	Resigned	4 February 2022	16th	(Greece) Dimitris Trivizadakis (caretaker)	4 February 2022
Kalamata	(Greece) Nikos Anastopoulos	Resigned	7 February 2022	4th	(Albania) Arjan Bellaj (caretaker)	7 February 2022
Irodotos	(Greece) Dimitris Trivizadakis (caretaker)	End of tenure as caretaker	7 February 2022	16th	(Greece) Ilias Fyntanis	7 February 2022
Rodos	(Greece) Sotiris Antoniou	Sacked	22 February 2022	12th	(Greece) Giorgos Koltzos (caretaker)	22 February 2022
AEK Athens B	(Greece) Sokratis Ofrydopoulos	Promoted to first team	1 March 2022	6th	(Greece) Nikos Panagiotaras	1 March 2022
Rodos	(Greece) Giorgos Koltzos (caretaker)	End of tenure as caretaker	7 March 2022	13th	(Greece) Giannis Chatzinikolaou	7 March 2022
Irodotos	(Greece) Ilias Fyntanis	Resigned	10 March 2022	15th	(Greece) Vasilis Vouzas	12 March 2022
Asteras Vlachioti	(Greece) Kostas Velitzelos	Sacked	16 March 2022	16th	(Greece) Ilias Fyntanis	18 March 2022
Rodos	(Greece) Giannis Chatzinikolaou	Resigned	1 April 2022	17th	(Greece) Nikos Kourbanas	2 April 2022
Karaiskakis	(Greece) Kostas Frantzeskos	Sacked	9 April 2022	14th	(Greece) Theodoros Kantas (caretaker)	9 April 2022
Karaiskakis	(Greece) Theodoros Kantas (caretaker)	End of tenure as caretaker	13 April 2022	15th	(Greece) Nikos Oustabasidis	13 April 2022

=== League table ===
Pos	Team	Pld	W	D	L	GF	GA	GD	Pts	Promotion, qualification or relegation (Note: AEK Athens B and Panathinaikos B are ineligible for promotion and relegation)
1	Levadiakos (Q)	32	22	6	4	68	19	+49	72	Qualification for the Title and Promotion play-offs
2	Kallithea	32	19	8	5	46	19	+27	65	
3	Kalamata (Note: Kalamata has 3 points deducted, from the HFF.)	32	19	7	6	51	20	+31	61	
4	Chania	32	14	13	5	46	25	+21	55	
5	AEK Athens B	32	14	10	8	38	27	+11	52	
6	A.E. Kifisia	32	15	5	12	37	31	+6	50	
7	Episkopi	32	13	9	10	27	25	+2	48	
8	Egaleo	32	13	7	12	31	31	0	46	
9	Ergotelis (Note: Ergotelis was relegated to local championships because of financial problems.) (R)	32	11	7	14	23	32	−9	40	Relegation to Local Championships
10	O.F. Ierapetra	32	10	7	15	43	49	−6	37	
11	Irodotos	32	10	7	15	29	42	−13	37	
12	Diagoras	32	9	9	14	22	36	−14	36	
13	Asteras Vlachioti (Note: Asteras Vlachioti was relegated to local championships because of financial problems.) (R)	32	9	8	15	32	38	−6	35	Relegation to Local Championships
14	Panathinaikos B	32	9	7	16	28	40	−12	34	
15	Karaiskakis (Note: Karaiskakis was relegated to local championships because of financial problems.) (R)	32	7	8	17	24	50	−26	29	Relegation to Local Championships
16	Rodos (Note: Rodos has 12 points deducted, from the HFF.) (R)	32	8	6	18	27	48	−21	18	Relegation to Gamma Ethniki
17	Zakynthos (Note: Zakynthos has 9 points deducted, from the HFF.) (R)	32	5	6	21	19	61	−42	12	Relegation to Gamma Ethniki

Source: sl2.gr
Rules for classification: 1) Points; 2) Head-to-head points; 3) Head-to-head goal difference; 4) Goals scored; 5) Goals against; 6) Play-offs (neutral ground, only used if needed to decide teams for promotion or relegation).
(Q) Qualified for the phase indicated; (R) Relegated

=== Results ===
Home \ Away	AKB	AVL	CHA	DGR	EGA	EPK	ERG	IRO	KAL	KLT	KAR	KIF	LEV	OFI	PTB	ROD	ZAK
AEK Athens B	—	1–0	1–0	0–1	1–1	1–0	1–1	3–1	1–0	0–3	2–1	2–2	2–1	2–2	0–1	5–0	1–0
Asteras Vlachioti	1–1	—	0–0	2–0	2–1	0–0	4–0	1–3	0–0	0–2	1–1	0–1	1–2	4–1	3–1	0–0	3–0 (Note: The game awarded a 3–0 w/o win to Asteras Vlachioti.)
Chania	2–1	3–1	—	2–0	1–0	1–0	0–0	0–0	1–2	0–0	4–0	3–0	3–1	2–0	2–0	2–2	5–1
Diagoras	0–1	2–0	2–2	—	1–1	1–0	0–2	1–1	0–1	0–0	0–1	0–2	1–1	0–0	1–2	1–0	2–0
Egaleo	1–1	1–0	1–1	1–2	—	1–1	2–0	2–0	1–2	0–0	1–0	1–0	1–2	2–0	2–1	3–1	2–1
Episkopi	1–3	0–1	1–1	1–0	1–1	—	1–0	1–0	0–0	1–1	0–1	1–0	0–0	0–1	3–2	4–2	1–0
Ergotelis	0–0	0–0	0–0	0–1	1–0	1–0	—	0–1	2–0	0–2	0–0	2–1	1–0	1–3	1–0	0–1	1–0
Irodotos	1–0	2–1	2–2	1–2	3–0	0–1	1–2	—	2–1	0–2	0–0	3–2	0–1	2–1	0–0	0–0	2–0
Kalamata	0–0	1–0	1–1	2–0	3–0	5–0	2–0	2–0	—	2–2	2–0	0–1	1–0	4–0	1–2	3–1	5–0
Kallithea	1–0	5–1	3–1	1–0	1–0	0–2	3–2	3–0	0–0	—	4–2	1–0	0–1	1–2	1–0	2–0	2–0
Karaiskakis	0–1	0–1	1–2	0–0	3–1	0–0	3–2	2–1	0–1	1–0	—	0–2	0–3	2–3	1–1	2–1	0–2
A.E. Kifisia	2–1	2–1	1–0	0–0	1–0	0–1	1–2	2–0	1–2	1–0	0–0	—	1–4	2–1	2–0	1–0	3–0
Levadiakos	2–2	2–1	1–1	4–0	1–0	1–0	1–0	6–0	3–0 (Note: Originally finished 0-0. Levadiakos made appeal and the game forfeited 3-0, because Kalamata's players had expired health cards.)	1–1	3–0	1–1	—	3–1	3–0	5–0	4–0
O.F. Ierapetra	1–2	3–1	0–0	2–2	0–1	0–1	1–2	1–1	0–2	1–2	5–1	2–1	0–1	—	2–0	1–1	5–1
Panathinaikos B	0–2	2–0	0–2	3–0	0–1	1–2	0–0	1–2	1–2	0–0	2–2	1–0	1–3	3–1	—	3–0	1–1
Rodos	1–0	0–1	0–1	3–0	0–1	0–0	1–0	1–0	0–3	0–1	3–0	1–3	0–4	1–2	0–0	—	4–0
Zakynthos	0–0	1–1	3–1	0–2	0–1	0–3	2–0	1–0	1–1	1–2	2–0	1–1	0–3 (Note: The game awarded a 0–3 w/o win to Levadiakos.)	1–1	0–1	0–3 (Note: Originally finished 5-0. Rodos made appeal and the game forfeited 0-3, because Zakynthos used fewer Greek footballers than the number provided in the announcement of the championship.)	—

Source: sl2.gr
Legend: Blue = home team win; Yellow = draw; Red = away team win.
For upcoming matches, an "a" indicates there is an article about the rivalry between the two participants.

== Title and promotion play-offs ==
Veria and Levadiakos played a 2 game title play-off on 8 and 15 May 2022.

8 May 2022
16:30 (EEST)
First leg

Veria	0–1	Levadiakos
		Poletto 58'

Veria Stadium, Veria
Referee: Valentin Zhelezov (Bulgaria)
15 May 2022
16:30 (EEST)
Second leg

Levadiakos	1–0	Veria
Barbosa 90+3'

Levadia Municipal Stadium, Livadeia
Referee: Aliyar Aghayev (Azerbaijan)

Levadiakos were promoted to Super League 1. Veria participated in matches relegation play-offs to Super League 1 with the 13th team of 2021–22 Super League 1 — Lamia.

== Top scorers ==
As of 1 May 2022

24 goals

- (Greece) Giannis Pasas (Veria)

21 goals

- (Greece) Giannis Loukinas (Kalamata)

20 goals

- (Greece) Christos Rovas (Almopos Aridea)

17 goals

- (Morocco) Hicham Kanis (Panserraikos)
- (Sweden) Admir Bajrovic (Chania)
- (Greece) Christos Giousis (AEK Athens B)
- (France) Anthony Mounier (Kallithea)

15 goals

- (Greece) Alexandros Arnarellis (Egaleo)

14 goals

- (Greece) Marios Ogkmpoe (AEL)

12 goals

- (Argentina) Nicolás Andereggen (O.F. Ierapetra)

11 goals

- (Spain) Nili (Levadiakos)
- (Greece) Andreas Vasilogiannis (Chania)
- (Greece) Andrews Tetteh (A.E. Kifisia)

10 goals

- (Greece) Theocharis Pozatzidis (Kallithea/Irodotos)
- (Greece) Apostolos Sarantidis (Thesprotos)
- (Greece) Dimitrios Diamantopoulos (Xanthi)
- (Greece) Georgios Koutsias (PAOK B)
- (Cameroon) Rooney Wankewai (Karaiskakis / Apollon Pontus)
- (Uruguay) Mathías Tomás (Iraklis)
- (Argentina) Alexis Messidoro (O.F. Ierapetra)

9 goals

- (Cameroon) Donaldoni Zambou Nguemechieu (Karaiskakis)
- (Cyprus) Nestoras Mytidis (Levadiakos)
- (Greece) Panagiotis Kynigopoulos (Kallithea)

8 goals

- (Greece) Petros Giakoumakis (Veria)
- (Brazil) Lucas Poletto (Levadiakos)
- (Netherlands) Tyrone Conraad (Ergotelis)
- (Serbia) Bogdan Stamenković (Kavala)
- (Paraguay) Wilson Chimeli (Zakynthos)
- (Brazil) Tharcysio (Episkopi)
- (Brazil) Miguel Bianconi (Anagennisi Karditsa)
- (Belgium) Denzel Jubitana (Iraklis)
