= 2026–27 Super League Greece 2 =

Super League 2
- Season: 2026–27
- Dates: 5 September 2026 – 11 April 2027
- Matches: 88
- Goals: 208 (2.36 per match)
- Top goalscorer: Iván Federico Müller; Youssef El-Arabi; Dimitrios Grammenos (7 goals each)
- Biggest home win: Marko 6–0 Zakynthos (16 November 2026)
- Biggest away win: PAS Pyrgos 0–4 AEL (21 September 2026)
- Highest scoring: Olympiacos B 2–4 Marko (20 September 2026); Olympiacos B 2–4 Hellas Syros (8 November 2026); PAS Pyrgos 2–4 PAOK B (8 November 2026)
- Longest winning run: Marko (6 matches)
- Longest unbeaten run: Marko (11 matches)
- Longest winless run: Zakynthos (11 matches)
- Longest losing run: Nestos Chrysoupoli (4 matches)
- All statistics correct as of 16 November 2026.

The 2026–27 Super League 2, also known as Superbet League 2 for sponsorship reasons, is the eighth season of the Super League 2, the second-tier Greek professional league for association football clubs, since the restructuring of the Greek football league system.

The championship began on 5 September 2026 with the 1st round of the regular season. The draw for the fixtures and the whole schedule of the season took place on 28 August 2026.

Liga S.A. is the official match ball supplier with the VENOM model.

== Teams ==
The following clubs have changed divisions in the last season championships.

=== From Super League Greece 2 ===
Promoted to Super League 1

- Iraklis
- Kalamata

Relegated to Gamma Ethniki

- Kavala
- PAS Giannina
- Makedonikos
- Egaleo
- Chania
- Ilioupoli
- Panargiakos

Relegated to Local Championships

- Kampaniakos

=== To Super League Greece 2 ===
Relegated from Super League 1

- AEL
- Panserraikos

Promoted from Gamma Ethniki

- Panthrakikos
- Apollon Kalamaria
- Zakynthos
- PAS Pyrgos

=== Format ===
The championship is being held with 16 teams in one group in one phase, where each team will face all opponents twice home and away, a total of 30 matches in the unified Group, after the further reduction of the teams from last year without play-offs for the promotion and play-outs for the relegation.

For fifth consecutive year, PAOK B competes and for third consecutive year, Asteras Tripolis B and Olympiacos B for second. B teams are eligible for relegation but not for promotion.

=== Promotion and Relegation ===
The top two teams after the conclusion of the championship will be promoted to Super League 1 and the last four will be relegated to Gamma Ethniki.

=== Stadiums and locations ===
Locations of the 2026–27 Super League Greece 2 teams

Note: The table is listed in alphabetical order.

Team	City	Stadium	Capacity	2025–26
AEL	Larissa	AEL FC Arena	16,118	Relegated from Super League 1
Anagennisi Karditsa	Karditsa	Karditsa Municipal Stadium	3,500	3rd North Group
Apollon Kalamaria	Kalamaria	Kalamaria Stadium	6,500	Promoted from Gamma Ethniki
Asteras Tripolis B	Tripoli	Theodoros Kolokotronis Stadium	7,423	4th North Group
Athens Kallithea	Kallithea	Grigoris Lamprakis Stadium	6,300	6th South Group
Hellas Syros	Ermoupoli	Ermoupoli Municipal Stadium	2,500	5th South Group
Marko	Markopoulo	Municipal Stadium of Markopoulo	3,000	3rd South Group
Nestos Chrysoupoli	Chrysoupoli	Chrysoupoli Municipal Stadium	5,000	6th North Group
Niki Volos	Volos	Pantelis Magoulas Stadium	2,500	2nd North Group
Olympiacos B	Piraeus	Rentis Training Centre	3,000	4th South Group
Panionios	Nea Smyrni	Nea Smyrni Stadium	11,700	2nd South Group
Panserraikos	Serres	Serres Municipal Stadium	9,500	Relegated from Super League 1
Panthrakikos	Komotini	Komotini Municipal Stadium	6,198	Promoted from Gamma Ethniki
PAOK B	Kalamaria	Kalamaria Stadium	6,500	5th North Group
PAS Pyrgos	Pyrgos	Pyrgos Municipal Stadium	6,750	Promoted from Gamma Ethniki
Zakynthos	Zakynthos	Zakynthos Municipal Stadium	5,000	Promoted from Gamma Ethniki

=== Personnel and sponsoring ===
Team	Manager	Captain	Kit manufacturer	Shirt sponsor
AEL	(Greece) Sokratis Ofrydopoulos	(Greece) Konstantinos Papageorgiou	(Germany) Erima	(Greece) Novibet
Anagennisi Karditsa	(Greece) Apostolos Charalampidis	(Greece) Nikos Golias	(Germany) Erima	None
Apollon Kalamaria	(Serbia) Zoran Milinković	(Greece) Alexandros Piastopoulos	(Italy) Macron	(Greece) Varagons
Asteras Tripolis B	(Greece) Giannis Kontoes	(Greece) Konstantinos Triantafyllopoulos	(United States) Nike	(Greece) Aktor
Athens Kallithea	(Greece) Vangelis Moras	(Greece) Michalis Manias	(Italy) Kappa	(Greece) EMST
Hellas Syros	(Greece) Thanasis Staikos	(Greece) Spyros Vlachos	(United States) Capelli	(Greece) ONEX (Sweden) betsson
Marko	(Greece) Soulis Papadopoulos	(Greece) Charalampos Pavlidis	(England) Admiral	(Greece) Europe Asfalistiki
Nestos Chrysoupoli	(Greece) Giannis Tatsis	(Greece) Lefteris Astras	(Italy) Macron	None
Niki Volos	(Greece) Alekos Vosniadis	(Greece) Adam Tzanetopoulos	(Italy) Macron	(Bulgaria) efbet
Olympiacos B	(Spain) Álvaro Rubio	(Greece) Nikos Gotzamanidis	(Germany) Adidas	(Greece) Stoiximan
Panionios	(Greece) Dimitris Koropoulis	(Greece) Τasos Avlonitis	(United States) Nike	(Romania) Superbet
Panserraikos	(Greece) Konstantinos Georgiadis	(Brazil) Alex Teixeira	(Italy) Erreà	None
Panthrakikos	(Greece) Giannis Apostolidis	(Greece) Giannis Pechlivanopoulos	(Italy) Macron	None
PAOK B	(Greece) Stelios Malezas	(Greece) Dimitrios Tsopouroglou	(Italy) Macron	(Romania) Superbet
PAS Pyrgos	(Greece) Dimitrios Spanos	(Greece) Georgios Saramantas	(Germany) Adidas	None
Zakynthos	(Greece) Ilias Fyntanis	(Argentina) Juan Neira	(Germany) Adidas	(Greece) Tzamia Xristodoulopoulos

=== Managerial changes ===
Team	Outgoing manager	Manner of departure	Date of vacancy	Position in table	Incoming manager	Date of appointment
Niki Volos	(Greece) Konstantinos Georgiadis	Sacked	26 March 2026	Pre-season	(Greece) Stelios Malezas	5 June 2026
Hellas Syros	(Greece) Panagiotis Christofileas	End of contract	28 April 2026	Pre-season	(Greece) Thanasis Staikos	18 May 2026
Panionios	(Greece) Vangelis Konstantinou	End of contract	25 May 2026	Pre-season	(Spain) Juan Ferrando	31 May 2026
Athens Kallithea	(Greece) Dimitris Kalaitzidis	End of contract	31 May 2026	Pre-season	(Greece) Vangelis Moras	5 June 2026
Panserraikos	(Spain) Gerard Zaragoza	End of contract	5 June 2026	Pre-season	(Greece) Alekos Vosniadis	15 June 2026
Panthrakikos	(Greece) Kostas Mpedrelis	End of contract	7 June 2026	Pre-season	(Greece) Konstantinos Georgiadis	10 June 2026
Apollon Kalamaria	(Serbia) Zoran Stoinović	Sacked	24 June 2026	Pre-season	(Greece) Giannis Tatsis	8 July 2026
AEL	(Italy) Gianluca Festa	End of contract	30 June 2026	Pre-season	(Greece) Sokratis Ofrydopoulos	15 July 2026
Anagennisi Karditsa	(Greece) Dimitrios Spanos	End of contract	30 June 2026	Pre-season	(Greece) Manolis Skyvalos	27 July 2026
Nestos Chrysoupoli	(Greece) Nikos Kechagias	Sacked	4 July 2026	Pre-season	(Greece) Timos Kavakas	5 July 2026
Anagennisi Karditsa	(Greece) Manolis Skyvalos	Resigned	11 August 2026	Pre-season	(Greece) Apostolos Charalampidis	11 August 2026
Zakynthos	(Greece) Giannis Apostolidis	Sacked	1 September 2026	Pre-season	(Greece) Periklis Amanatidis	2 September 2026
Niki Volos	(Greece) Stelios Malezas	Sacked	21 September 2026	16th	(Greece) Alekos Vosniadis	24 September 2026
Panserraikos	(Greece) Alekos Vosniadis	Sacked	22 September 2026	10th	(Greece) Konstantinos Georgiadis	24 September 2026
Panthrakikos	(Greece) Konstantinos Georgiadis	Resigned	22 September 2026	4th	(Greece) Giannis Apostolidis	23 September 2026
Nestos Chrysoupoli	(Greece) Timos Kavakas	Resigned	24 September 2026	9th	(Greece) Tasos Sideridis (caretaker)	24 September 2026
Zakynthos	(Greece) Periklis Amanatidis	Resigned	6 October 2026	15th	(Greece) Ilias Fyntanis	7 October 2026
Nestos Chrysoupoli	(Greece) Tasos Sideridis (caretaker)	End of tenure as caretaker	7 October 2026	13th	(Greece) Sakis Papavasiliou	7 October 2026
PAS Pyrgos	(Greece) Nondas Koutromanos	Sacked	20 October 2026	15th	(Greece) Dimitrios Spanos	21 October 2026
Apollon Kalamaria	(Greece) Giannis Tatsis	Resigned	22 October 2026	8th	(Serbia) Zoran Milinković	1 November 2026
Panionios	(Spain) Juan Ferrando	Sacked	9 November 2026	4th	(Greece) Dimitris Koropoulis	12 November 2026
Nestos Chrysoupoli	(Greece) Sakis Papavasiliou	Sacked	10 November 2026	13th	(Greece) Giannis Tatsis	12 November 2026
PAOK B	(Spain) Dani Ponz	Promoted to assistant coach	12 November 2026	11th	(Greece) Stelios Malezas	13 November 2026

== League table ==
Pos	Team	Pld	W	D	L	GF	GA	GD	Pts	Promotion (Note: PAOK B, Asteras Tripolis B and Olympiacos B are ineligible for promotion but eligible for relegation.)
1	Marko	11	9	2	0	25	6	+19	29	Promotion to Super League 1
2	AEL	12	6	5	1	17	7	+10	23	Promotion to Super League 1
3	Athens Kallithea	12	6	4	2	13	7	+6	22	
4	Panionios	12	6	3	3	15	9	+6	21	
5	Niki Volos	11	6	2	3	16	10	+6	20	
6	Panserraikos	12	7	2	3	22	15	+7	19 (Note: Panserraikos were deducted 4 points due to match-fixing in their games v Volos in the Relegation play-outs of the 2024–25 Super League Greece season in order for both to avoid relegation, which resulted in Athens Kallithea being relegated instead.)	
7	Hellas Syros	12	5	4	3	18	11	+7	19	
8	Asteras Tripolis B	12	4	4	4	15	13	+2	16	
9	Panthrakikos	12	3	5	4	12	14	−2	14	
10	Anagennisi Karditsa	12	3	4	5	8	12	−4	13	
11	Nestos Chrysoupoli	12	3	3	6	11	15	−4	12	
12	PAOK B	11	3	3	5	10	17	−7	12	
13	Apollon Kalamaria	12	2	4	6	9	15	−6	10	Relegation to Gamma Ethniki
14	PAS Pyrgos	11	2	3	6	9	16	−7	9	Relegation to Gamma Ethniki
15	Olympiacos B	12	1	4	7	14	25	−11	7	Relegation to Gamma Ethniki
16	Zakynthos	12	0	4	8	8	30	−22	4	Relegation to Gamma Ethniki

Updated to match(es) played on 22 November 2026. Source: sl2.gr
Rules for classification: 1) Points; 2) Head-to-head points; 3) Head-to-head goal difference; 4) Goal difference; 5) Goals scored; 6) Goals against; 7) Play-offs (neutral ground); 8) Draw.
(Note: Criteria 7 is only used if needed to decide champion, teams for relegation).

== Results ==
Home \ Away	AEL	ANK	APK	AST	ATK	ELS	MAR	NES	NKV	OLB	PIO	PNS	PAN	PKB	PYR	ZAK
AEL	—	1–1						0–0		2–1			0–0	1–0		1–0
Anagennisi Karditsa		—					1–1				0–0			1–0		3–0
Apollon Kalamaria		1–0	—		1–1				0–2						1–0	
Asteras Tripolis B		2–0	1–0	—										4–0	1–1	1–1
Athens Kallithea	1–1			2–0	—				2–1		2–0	2–1	1–0			
Hellas Syros		3–0	2–2		1–0	—			0–1				2–0		0–0	
Marko	1–0				2–1	0–0	—	2–0				1–0	2–1			6–0
Nestos Chrysoupoli				1–2	0–0		1–2	—					1–3		1–0	1–1
Niki Volos	2–2	2–1						2–0	—	1–2	1–1				2–1	
Olympiacos B				1–1	0–1	2–4	2–4	1–2		—						
Panionios			1–0	2–0			0–4			2–0	—			3–0		1–0
Panserraikos		2–0	2–1	1–0		3–2		2–1		4–1		—	5–0			
Panthrakikos	0–3			2–2			0–4		1–0	2–2		1–1	—	2–0	0–0	
PAOK B			2–1			0–0		2–1		1–1				—		1–1
PAS Pyrgos	0–4	0–1									2–0			2–4	—	
Zakynthos			1–1			1–4			0–2						2–3	—

Updated to match(es) played on 16 November 2026. Source: sl2.gr
Legend: Blue = home team win; Yellow = draw; Red = away team win.
For upcoming matches, an "a" indicates there is an article about the rivalry between the two participants.

== Positions by round ==
The table lists the positions of teams after each week of matches. To preserve chronological evolvements, any postponed matches are not included in the round at which they were originally scheduled, but added to the full round they were played immediately afterwards. For example, if a match is scheduled for round 13, but then postponed and played between rounds 16 and 17, it will be added to the standings for round 16. Juridical decisions regarding a match are also added to the full round after which they were ruled.

Team ╲ Round	1	2	3	4	5	6	7	8	9	10	11	12	13	14	15	16	17	18	19	20	21	22	23	24	25	26	27	28	29	30
Marko	3	2	1	1	1	1	1	1	1	1	1																			
Athens Kallithea	2	8	6	4	5	2	2	2	3	2	2																			
Niki Volos	14	15	16	12	12	8	7	5	5	4	3																			
AEL	9	6	3	2	2	4	4	4	4	3	4																			
Panionios	1	1	5	3	3	3	3	3	2	5	5																			
Hellas Syros	5	3	2	5	4	5	5	9	6	6	6																			
Panserraikos	15	9	10	7	14	10	12	7	9	7	7																			
Asteras Tripolis B	16	16	11	13	7	9	10	10	10	9	8																			
Panthrakikos	12	4	4	6	6	6	6	8	7	8	9																			
Anagennisi Karditsa	6	14	12	14	16	13	9	6	8	10	10																			
PAOK B	11	13	7	10	9	12	11	11	12	11	11																			
Nestos Chrysoupoli	10	7	9	9	13	15	14	12	13	13	12																			
Apollon Kalamaria	4	10	13	8	8	7	8	13	14	14	13																			
PAS Pyrgos	13	12	15	15	10	14	15	14	11	12	14																			
Olympiacos B	8	5	8	11	11	11	13	15	15	15	15																			
Zakynthos	7	11	14	16	15	16	16	16	16	16	16																			

Leader and Promotion to Super League 1
Promotion to Super League 1
Relegation to Gamma Ethniki

Updated to match(es) played on 16 November 2026. Source: sl2.gr

== Top scorers ==
As of 16 November 2026

Rank	Player	Club	Goals
1	(Argentina) Iván Federico Müller	Marko	7
1	(Morocco) Youssef El-Arabi	Marko	7
1	(Greece) Dimitrios Grammenos	Asteras Tripolis B	7
4	(Greece) Michalis Manias	Athens Kallithea	6
4	(Greece) Giannis Pasas	Panserraikos	6
6	(Greece) Apostolos Sarantidis	Panthrakikos	5

== Awards ==
=== Monthly awards ===
Month	Manager of the Month		Player of the Month		Reference
Month	Manager	Club	Player	Club	Reference
September	(Greece) Soulis Papadopoulos	Marko	(Greece) Argyris Kampetsis	AEL	
October	(Greece) Alekos Vosniadis	Niki Volos	(Argentina) Iván Federico Müller	Marko	
