= 2020–21 Football League (Greece) =

Football League Greece
- Season: 2020–2021
- Dates: 27 March 2021 – 27 June 2021
- Champions: Veria; Kalamata
- Relegated: AEP Kozani; Ialysos Rodos; Santorini 2020; Aspropyrgos
- Matches: 180

The 2020–21 Football League Greece was the second season as a third-tier professional league of the Greek football league system since its restructuring and the tenth season under the name Football League after previously being known as Beta Ethniki. That was the first season after 2014–15 that the league has more than one groups. The groups are created based on geographical criteria. That was the last season of the league before their abolishment and a merger with Super League Greece 2, as a result of a new restructuring of the Greek league system. The 2020-21 season start has been delayed due to the COVID-19 second lockdown in Greece that began in November 2020.

== North Group ==
=== Teams ===
Locations the 2020–21 Football League North Group clubs

Club	Location	Stadium	Capacity
AEP Kozani	Kozani	Kozani Municipal Stadium	4,000
Almopos Aridea	Aridaea	Aridea Municipal Stadium	700
Apollon Pontus	Thessaloniki	Kalamaria Stadium	6,500
Kavala	Kavala	Anthi Karagianni Stadium	10,550
Olympiacos Volos	Volos	Neapoli Volos Municipal Stadium	2,500
Panserraikos	Serres	Serres Municipal Stadium	9,500
Pierikos	Katerini	Katerini Municipal Stadium	4,995
Thesprotos	Igoumenitsa	Igoumenitsa Municipal Stadium	3,500
Triglia	Triglia	Triglia Municipal Stadium	5,000
Veria	Veria	Veria Stadium	7,000

=== Personnel and sponsoring ===
Team	Manager	Captain	Kit manufacturer	Sponsor
AEP Kozani	(Czech Republic) Roman Nádvorník	N/A	Macron	N/A
Almopos Aridea	(Greece) Georgios Tyriakidis	N/A	Erreà	Loutra Pozar
Apollon Pontus	(Greece) Dimitris Kalaitzidis	N/A	Nike	N/A
Kavala	(Greece) Konstantinos Anyfantakis	(Greece) Vasilis Gavriilidis	Macron	Ellagrolip
Olympiacos Volos	(Greece) Vasilis Vouzas	N/A	Nike	Iama
Panserraikos	(Greece) Petros Stoilas	N/A	Macron	Spyropoulos
Pierikos	(Greece) Sakis Papavasiliou	N/A	Macron	N/A
Thesprotos	(Argentina) Juan Ramón Rocha	(Greece) Charilaos Bikas	Kappa	Car.gr
Triglia	(Greece) Kostas Georgiadis	(Greece) Manolis Papasterianos	Macron	N/A
Veria	(Greece) Pavlos Dermitzakis	N/A	GSA Sport	Dacristo

=== League table ===
Pos	Team	Pld	W	D	L	GF	GA	GD	Pts	Promotion or relegation
1	Veria (C)	18	11	5	2	24	6	+18	38	Eligibility for Super League 2
2	Kavala	18	11	2	5	32	18	+14	35	Eligibility for Super League 2
3	Panserraikos	18	10	1	7	21	12	+9	31	Eligibility for Super League 2
4	Olympiacos Volos	18	9	2	7	23	21	+2	29	Eligibility for Super League 2
5	Pierikos	18	7	5	6	23	21	+2	26	Eligibility for Super League 2
6	Thesprotos	18	6	4	8	19	24	−5	22	Eligibility for Super League 2
7	Triglia	18	4	9	5	14	16	−2	21	Eligibility for Super League 2
8	Almopos Aridea	18	5	5	8	18	21	−3	20	Eligibility for Super League 2
9	Apollon Pontus (Note: Apollon Pontus were readmitted to the Super League 2 due to departure of teams.)	18	5	4	9	15	24	−9	19	Eligibility for Super League 2
10	AEP Kozani (R)	18	0	7	11	7	33	−26	7	Relegation to Gamma Ethniki

Source: https://sl2fl.gr/vathmologia-fl-b-omilos/
Rules for classification: 1) Points; 2) Head-to-head points; 3) Head-to-head goal difference; 4) Goals scored; 5) Goals against; 6) Play-offs (neutral ground, only used if needed to decide teams for promotion or relegation).
(C) Champions; (R) Relegated

=== Results ===
Home \ Away	AKO	ALM	APP	KAV	OLV	PIE	PSE	THE	TRG	VER
AEP Kozani	—	0–0	1–1	0–2	1–3	0–1	0–2	1–1	0–0	0–0
Almopos Aridea	1–1	—	4–1	3–1	0–1	3–1	1–0	0–0	3–0	0–0
Apollon Pontus	3–0	3–1	—	0–1	2–0	2–2	0–3	0–1	1–1	0–3
Kavala	5–1	2–1	0–1	—	1–2	3–0	2–1	1–1	3–1	0–0
Olympiacos Volos	3–0	2–0	1–0	1–3	—	3–3	0–1	4–2	1–0	0–2
Pierikos	1–1	2–0	3–0	0–2	1–1	—	1–0	2–0	2–0	0–1
Panserraikos	1–0	3–0	2–0	1–3	0–1	2–0	—	1–0	1–0	1–0
Thesprotos	3–1	1–0	1–2	0–1	1–0	0–2	3–2	—	0–0	3–2
Triglia	3–0	1–1	0–0	3–2	2–0	0–0	0–0	2–1	—	0–0
Veria	3–0	2–0	1–0	2–0	3–0	2–1	1–0	3–1	0–0	—

Source: sl2fl.gr
Legend: Blue = home team win; Yellow = draw; Red = away team win.
For upcoming matches, an "a" indicates there is an article about the rivalry between the two participants.

== South Group ==
=== Teams ===
Locations the 2020–21 Football League South Group clubs

Club	Location	Stadium	Capacity
Aspropyrgos	Aspropyrgos	Aspropyrgos Municipal Stadium	2,000
Asteras Vlachioti	Vlachioti	Vlachioti Municipal Stadium	600
Egaleo	Egaleo	Stavros Mavrothalassitis Stadium	8,217
Episkopi	Episkopi	Gallos Stadium	1,500
Ialysos Rodos	Ialysos	Economideio Municipal Stadium	2,000
Kalamata	Kalamata	Kalamata Municipal Stadium	5,613
Kallithea	Kallithea	Grigoris Lambrakis Stadium	4,200
Niki Volos	Volos	Panthessaliko Stadium	22,700
Rodos	Rhodes	Diagoras Stadium	3,693
Santorini	Santorini	Kamari Stadium	1,500

=== Personnel and sponsoring ===
Team	Manager	Captain	Kit manufacturer	Sponsor
Aspropyrgos	(Greece) Ilias Fyntanis	N/A	Kappa	Endless
Asteras Vlachioti	(Greece) Georgios Vazakas	N/A	Saller	Martsoukos
Egaleo	(Greece) Thomas Grafas	(Greece) Ilias Tsiligiris	Macron	Kyriakoulis
Episkopi	(Bosnia and Herzegovina) Jasminko Velić	(Greece) Dimitris Soubasakis	Lotto	Avin
Ialysos Rodos	(Greece) Vangelis Chantes	(Greece) Vangelis Reklitis	Erreà	N/A
Kalamata	(Greece) Nikos Anastopoulos	(Greece) Michalis Zacharopoulos	Capelli	Volterra
Kallithea	(Greece) Giannis Tatsis	(Greece) Mattheos Maroukakis	Zeus	N/A
Niki Volos	(Greece) Alekos Vosniadis	(Greece) Sotiris Balafas	Macron	Car.gr
Rodos	(Greece) Kostas Velitzelos	(Greece) Georgios Delaportas	Kappa	Mitsis Hotels
Santorini	(Greece) Nikos Pantelis	N/A	Macron	Katselis

=== League table ===
Pos	Team	Pld	W	D	L	GF	GA	GD	Pts	Promotion or relegation
1	Kalamata (C)	18	10	5	3	20	7	+13	35	Eligibility for Super League 2
2	Episkopi	18	6	9	3	15	10	+5	27	Eligibility for Super League 2
3	Rodos	18	8	6	4	19	15	+4	27 (Note: Rodos has 3 points deducted, from the Football League for invalid bulletins.)	Eligibility for Super League 2
4	Ialysos Rodos (Note: Relegation due to non-issuance of a Super League 2 certificate.) (R)	18	6	6	6	16	22	−6	24	Relegation to Local Championship
5	Santorini (R)	18	6	6	6	15	16	−1	24	Relegation to Gamma Ethniki
6	Kallithea	18	7	5	6	18	16	+2	23 (Note: Kallithea has 3 points deducted, from the Football League for irregular player participation.)	Eligibility for Super League 2
7	Egaleo	18	6	5	7	14	14	0	23	Eligibility for Super League 2
8	Niki Volos	18	4	10	4	18	14	+4	22	Eligibility for Super League 2
9	Asteras Vlachioti (Note: Asteras Vlachioti was readmitted to the Super League 2 due to departure of teams.)	18	6	4	8	16	14	+2	22	Eligibility for Super League 2
10	Aspropyrgos (R)	18	2	2	14	10	34	−24	8	Relegation to Local Championship

Source: https://sl2fl.gr/fl-notios-omilos/
Rules for classification: 1) Points; 2) Head-to-head points; 3) Head-to-head goal difference; 4) Goals scored; 5) Goals against; 6) Play-offs (neutral ground, only used if needed to decide teams for promotion or relegation).
(C) Champions; (R) Relegated

=== Results ===
Home \ Away	EAS	AVL	EGA	EPI	IAL	KAL	KLT	NVL	ROD	SAN
Aspropyrgos	—	0–4	0–2	1–2	3–0	0–3	0–3	3–2	0–2	1–2
Asteras Vlachioti	1–0	—	1–0	1–1	1–1	0–1	3–0 (Note: The game awarded a 3–0 w/o win to Asteras Vlachioti.)	0–0	0–0	2–1
Egaleo	1–0	1–0	—	1–3	0–2	2–0	0–0	0–0	1–1	3–0
Episkopi	1–1	1–0	0–0	—	3–0	1–0	0–0	0–0	0–0	1–0
Ialysos Rodos	2–0	1–2	1–1	1–0	—	0–0	1–1	1–1	0–2	1–0
Kalamata	2–0	2–0	2–0	1–0	4–0	—	1–0	0–0	1–0	1–0
Kallithea	1–0	1–0	1–0	2–0	2–1	2–1	—	0–0	2–3	1–1
Niki Volos	6–1	1–0	1–2	0–0	0–1	2–2	1–0	—	1–2	1–1
Rodos	1–0	2–1	1–0	0–0	1–2	0–0	3–2	1–1	—	0–3 (Note: The game awarded a 3–0 w/o win to Santorini.)
Santorini 2020	0–0	1–0	1–0	2–2	1–0	0–0	1–0	0–1	1–0	—

Source: sl2fl.gr
Legend: Blue = home team win; Yellow = draw; Red = away team win.
For upcoming matches, an "a" indicates there is an article about the rivalry between the two participants.
