= 2025–26 Super League Greece 2 =

Super League 2
- Season: 2025–26
- Dates: 13 September 2025 – 26 April 2026
- Champions: North Group; Iraklis (2nd Second Division title) (1st Super League 2 title) South Group; Kalamata (3rd Second Division title) (1st Super League 2 title)
- Promoted: Iraklis; Kalamata
- Relegated: North Group; Kavala; Kampaniakos; PAS Giannina; Makedonikos South Group; Egaleo; Chania; Ilioupoli; Panargiakos
- Matches: 258
- Goals: 589 (2.28 per match)
- Top goalscorer: Giannis Loukinas (16 goals)
- Biggest home win: Niki Volos 6–0 Kavala (18 October 2025); Niki Volos 6–0 Makedonikos (9 November 2025)
- Biggest away win: PAOK B 1–6 Niki Volos (15 November 2025)
- Highest scoring: PAOK B 1–6 Niki Volos (15 November 2025); Makedonikos 4–3 Kampaniakos (18 April 2026) PAS Giannina 4–3 Kampaniakos (26 April 2026)
- Longest winning run: Kalamata (11 matches)
- Longest unbeaten run: Iraklis (24 matches)
- Longest winless run: Panargiakos (24 matches)
- Longest losing run: Ilioupoli (7 matches)

The 2025–26 Super League 2 was the seventh season of the Super League 2, the second-tier Greek professional league for association football clubs, since the restructuring of the Greek football league system.

The division of the groups and the draw for the fixtures took place on 1 September 2025 and shortly after the entire schedule for the regular season was released.

The championship began on 13 September 2025 with the 1st round of the regular season in both groups. The winter break started on 22 December 2025, while the regular season concluded on 25 January 2026. Promotion play-offs and relegation play-outs started on 15 February 2026, with play-offs ending on 22 March 2026 and the whole league concluded on 26 April 2026, with the last fixture for the play-outs round.

Starting from this year's championship, Adidas was the official match ball supplier.

== Competition ==
The championship was planned to be held with 21 teams in two groups, but after Lamia did not declare participation the number of teams became 20 and so it was decided to hold the championship again in two groups of 10 teams each, same as last year. For the fourth consecutive year, PAOK B competed and for the second consecutive year, Asteras Tripolis B. Olympiacos B participated in the category again, after 1 year, due to the dissolution of AEK Athens B. From this season, the B teams were able to be relegated normally, without replacement in case of relegation and at the same time they would have the right to compete in the Gamma Ethniki, if they wished.

The deadline for submitting participation statements was set on July 7, 2025.

=== Format ===
The championship was held in two phases. In the first phase in each group, each team faced all opponents twice (home and away, a total of 18 matches in the North and South group). There was no direct relegation.

The second phase included classification matches (play off and play out) for the first place in both groups and promotion to Super League 1 and for the relegation of a total of eight teams to Gamma Ethniki, those who occupied positions 7–10 in both groups.

The play-offs, this time, featured the top four teams in the first phase standings, and played the rest twice, home and away. They were consisted of 6 rounds and 6 matches for each team. The teams entered the play-offs with half of the points they earned in the first phase.

The teams that occupied positions 5-10 participated in the play-outs. The teams started with half of the points they earned in the first phase and competed with the rest in double matches home and away (10 rounds, 10 matches for each team).

=== Promotion and Relegation ===
A total of two (2) teams were promoted to Super League 1, the winners of the play-offs of each group, and a total of eight (8) teams were relegated to Gamma Ethniki (the last four from the play-outs), so that in the 2026–2027 season the championship will be held with the participation of 16 teams in one group.

== Team changes ==
=== From Super League Greece 2 ===
Promoted to Super League 1

- AEL
- A.E. Kifisia

Relegated to Gamma Ethniki

- Diagoras
- Ethnikos Neo Keramidi
- Panachaiki

Dissolved

- AEK Athens B

=== To Super League Greece 2 ===
Relegated from Super League 1

- Athens Kallithea

Promoted from Gamma Ethniki

- Nestos Chrysoupoli
- Anagennisi Karditsa
- Hellas Syros
- Marko

Invited to fill the gap of B Team

- Olympiacos B

Did not declare participation in Super League 2

- Lamia

== North group ==
=== Teams, stadiums and locations ===
Locations of the 2025–26 Super League 2 North Group clubs

| Team | City | Stadium | Capacity |
|---|---|---|---|
| Anagennisi Karditsa | Karditsa | Karditsa Municipal Stadium | 3,500 |
| Asteras Tripolis B | Tripoli | Theodoros Kolokotronis Stadium | 7,423 |
| Iraklis | Thessaloniki | Kaftanzoglio Stadium | 27,770 |
| Kampaniakos | Chalastra | Chalastra Municipal Stadium | 670 |
| Kavala | Kavala | Anthi Karagianni Stadium | 10,550 |
| Makedonikos | Efkarpia | Makedonikos Stadium | 6,500 |
| Nestos Chrysoupoli | Chrysoupoli | Chrysoupoli Municipal Stadium | 5,000 |
| Niki Volos | Volos | Pantelis Magoulas Stadium | 2,500 |
| PAOK B | Kalamaria | Kalamaria Stadium | 6,500 |
| PAS Giannina | Ioannina | Zosimades Stadium | 7,652 |

=== Personnel and sponsoring ===
| Team | Manager | Captain |
|---|---|---|
| Anagennisi Karditsa | (Greece) Dimitrios Spanos | (Greece) Nikos Golias |
| Asteras Tripolis B | (Greece) Staikos Vergetis | (Greece) Christos Gromitsaris |
| Iraklis | (Greece) Giorgos Petrakis | (Albania) Kristian Kushta |
| Kampaniakos | (Greece) Sotiris Avgeros | (Greece) Nikos Katharios |
| Kavala | (Greece) Giannis Tatsis | (Greece) Vasilis Gavriilidis |
| Makedonikos | (Greece) Thanos Kourtoglou | (Greece) Stelios Tsoukanis |
| Nestos Chrysoupoli | (Greece) Nikos Kechagias | (Greece) Panagiotis Ballas |
| Niki Volos | (Greece) Konstantinos Georgiadis | (Greece) Giannis Loukinas |
| PAOK B | (Spain) Dani Ponz | (Greece) Dimitris Monastirlis |
| PAS Giannina | (Greece) Giannis Goumas | (Spain) Pedro Conde |

=== Managerial changes ===
| Team | Outgoing manager | Manner of departure | Date of vacancy | Position in table | Incoming manager | Date of appointment |
|---|---|---|---|---|---|---|
| Iraklis | (Greece) Pavlos Dermitzakis | End of contract | 13 May 2025 | Pre-season | (Greece) Babis Tennes | 16 May 2025 |
| Iraklis | (Greece) Babis Tennes | Sacked | 17 September 2025 | 6th | (Greece) Dimitris Spanos | 18 September 2025 |
| PAOK B | (Greece) Nikos Karageorgiou | Sacked | 20 October 2025 | 8th | (Spain) Dani Ponz | 21 October 2025 |
| Kampaniakos | (Greece) Giannis Apostolidis | Resigned | 21 October 2025 | 10th | (Greece) Antonis Papatzikos (caretaker) | 21 October 2025 |
| Kavala | (Greece) Thomas Grafas | Resigned | 26 October 2025 | 9th | (Greece) Giorgos Polychronidis (caretaker) | 26 October 2025 |
| Kampaniakos | (Greece) Antonis Papatzikos (caretaker) | End of tenure as caretaker | 30 October 2025 | 7th | (Greece) Apostolos Charalampidis | 30 October 2025 |
| Iraklis | (Greece) Dimitris Spanos | Sacked | 2 November 2025 | 1st | (Greece) Ieroklis Stoltidis (caretaker) | 2 November 2025 |
| Makedonikos | (Greece) Sakis Papavasiliou | Sacked | 11 November 2025 | 10th | (Greece) Giorgos Tyriakidis | 11 November 2025 |
| Kavala | (Greece) Giorgos Polychronidis (caretaker) | End of tenure as caretaker | 12 November 2025 | 8th | (Greece) Giannis Tatsis | 12 November 2025 |
| PAS Giannina | (Greece) Nikos Koustas | Sacked | 15 November 2025 | 9th | (Greece) Giannis Goumas | 17 November 2025 |
| Iraklis | (Greece) Ieroklis Stoltidis (caretaker) | End of tenure as caretaker | 24 November 2025 | 1st | (Serbia) Nebojša Vignjević | 24 November 2025 |
| Anagennisi Karditsa | (Greece) Timos Kavakas | Sacked | 22 December 2025 | 2nd | (Greece) Dimitrios Spanos | 24 December 2025 |
| Iraklis | (Serbia) Nebojša Vignjević | Sacked | 5 January 2026 | 1st | (Greece) Giorgos Petrakis | 5 January 2026 |
| Makedonikos | (Greece) Giorgos Tyriakidis | Resigned | 28 January 2026 | 10th | (Greece) Thanos Kourtoglou (caretaker) | 28 January 2026 |
| Asteras Tripolis B | (Greece) Georgios Antonopoulos | Promoted to head coach | 3 March 2026 | 4th | (Greece) Staikos Vergetis | 4 March 2026 |
| Kampaniakos | (Greece) Apostolos Charalampidis | Resigned | 6 March 2026 | 8th | (Greece) Sotiris Avgeros (caretaker) | 6 March 2026 |

=== League table ===
| Pos | Team | Pld | W | D | L | GF | GA | GD | Pts | Promotion or relegation (Note: PAOK B, Asteras Tripolis B are ineligible for promotion but eligible for relegation.) |
|---|---|---|---|---|---|---|---|---|---|---|
| 1 | Iraklis | 18 | 13 | 5 | 0 | 34 | 13 | +21 | 44 | Qualification for the Play-off round |
| 2 | Niki Volos | 18 | 11 | 6 | 1 | 41 | 10 | +31 | 39 | Qualification for the Play-off round |
| 3 | Anagennisi Karditsa | 18 | 12 | 3 | 3 | 25 | 10 | +15 | 39 | Qualification for the Play-off round |
| 4 | Asteras Tripolis B | 18 | 9 | 5 | 4 | 25 | 17 | +8 | 32 | Qualification for the Play-off round |
| 5 | PAOK B | 18 | 7 | 3 | 8 | 25 | 23 | +2 | 24 | Qualification for the Play-out round |
| 6 | Kavala | 18 | 6 | 5 | 7 | 16 | 22 | −6 | 23 | Qualification for the Play-out round |
| 7 | Nestos Chrysoupoli | 18 | 5 | 3 | 10 | 13 | 21 | −8 | 18 | Qualification for the Play-out round |
| 8 | Kampaniakos | 18 | 4 | 3 | 11 | 12 | 32 | −20 | 15 | Qualification for the Play-out round |
| 9 | PAS Giannina | 18 | 2 | 4 | 12 | 10 | 24 | −14 | 10 | Qualification for the Play-out round |
| 10 | Makedonikos | 18 | 1 | 3 | 14 | 8 | 37 | −29 | 6 | Qualification for the Play-out round |

Source: sl2.gr
Rules for classification: 1) Points; 2) Head-to-head points; 3) Head-to-head goal difference; 4) Goal difference; 5) Goals scored; 6) Goals against; 7) Play-offs (neutral ground); 8) Draw.
(Note: Criteria 7 is only used if needed to decide champion, teams for relegation).

=== Results ===
| Home \ Away | ANK | AST | IRA | KAM | KAV | MAK | NES | NKV | PKB | PAS |
|---|---|---|---|---|---|---|---|---|---|---|
| Anagennisi Karditsa | — | 2–0 | 1–1 | 2–0 | 3–0 | 3–0 | 1–2 | 0–3 | 2–1 | 1–0 |
| Asteras Tripolis B | 0–1 | — | 0–1 | 4–1 | 1–0 | 3–0 | 2–1 | 3–1 | 1–1 | 2–1 |
| Iraklis | 1–0 | 2–2 | — | 2–2 | 1–0 | 3–0 | 3–1 | 0–0 | 2–1 | 4–0 |
| Kampaniakos | 0–3 | 0–1 | 0–1 | — | 1–0 | 2–1 | 1–1 | 1–3 | 0–0 | 2–0 |
| Kavala | 2–3 | 1–1 | 1–2 | 1–0 | — | 1–1 | 1–0 | 2–2 | 1–1 | 2–0 |
| Makedonikos | 0–1 | 1–1 | 1–4 | 0–1 | 0–1 | — | 2–2 | 0–1 | 1–3 | 1–0 |
| Nestos Chrysoupoli | 0–1 | 0–1 | 1–2 | 2–0 | 0–1 | 1–0 | — | 0–0 | 0–2 | 1–0 |
| Niki Volos | 0–0 | 3–1 | 1–1 | 4–0 | 6–0 | 6–0 | 2–0 | — | 1–0 | 1–0 |
| PAOK B | 0–1 | 0–1 | 1–2 | 4–1 | 0–2 | 3–0 | 2–0 | 1–6 | — | 1–0 |
| PAS Giannina | 0–0 | 1–1 | 1–2 | 3–0 | 0–0 | 1–0 | 0–1 | 1–1 | 2–4 | — |

Source: sl2.gr
Legend: Blue = home team win; Yellow = draw; Red = away team win.
For upcoming matches, an "a" indicates there is an article about the rivalry between the two participants.

The draw for the Play-off and Play-out rounds took place on 2 February 2026, with first matches played on 15 February 2026.

=== Play-off round ===
In the play-offs, the first four teams in the first phase's standings participated, and they competed twice with the rest, at home and away to decide the North Group's Champion who was also promoted to next year's Super League 1. They included 6 matchdays and 6 matches for each team. The teams entered with half of the points they had won in the first phase.

| Pos | Team | Pld | W | D | L | GF | GA | GD | Pts | Promotion (Note: Asteras Tripolis B is ineligible for promotion.) |
|---|---|---|---|---|---|---|---|---|---|---|
| 1 | Iraklis (C, P) | 6 | 5 | 1 | 0 | 9 | 1 | +8 | 38 | Promotion to Super League 1 |
| 2 | Niki Volos | 6 | 2 | 3 | 1 | 5 | 2 | +3 | 29 | |
| 3 | Anagennisi Karditsa | 6 | 0 | 2 | 4 | 3 | 8 | −5 | 22 | |
| 4 | Asteras Tripolis B | 6 | 1 | 2 | 3 | 4 | 10 | −6 | 21 | |

Source: sl2.gr
Rules for classification: 1) Points; 2) Regular season position
(C) Champions; (P) Promoted

=== Play-off Results ===
| Home \ Away | IRA | NKV | ANK | AST |
|---|---|---|---|---|
| Iraklis | — | 0–0 | 3–1 | 2–0 |
| Niki Volos | 0–1 | — | 1–0 | 3–0 |
| Anagennisi Karditsa | 0–1 | 0–0 | — | 2–2 |
| Asteras Tripolis B | 0–2 | 1–1 | 1–0 | — |

Source: sl2.gr
Legend: Blue = home team win; Yellow = draw; Red = away team win.
For upcoming matches, an "a" indicates there is an article about the rivalry between the two participants.

=== Play-out round ===
The teams that took the positions 5th to 10th in the regular season participated in the play-outs. As in the play-offs, the teams started with half of the points they collected in the first phase and competed with the rest in double matches home and away (10 matches for each team). The teams that occupied the last four positions in the play outs were relegated to next year's Gamma Ethniki.

| Pos | Team | Pld | W | D | L | GF | GA | GD | Pts | Relegation |
|---|---|---|---|---|---|---|---|---|---|---|
| 1 | PAOK B | 10 | 7 | 1 | 2 | 19 | 8 | +11 | 34 | |
| 2 | Nestos Chrysoupoli | 10 | 6 | 4 | 0 | 17 | 5 | +12 | 31 | |
| 3 | Kavala (R) | 10 | 3 | 3 | 4 | 14 | 15 | −1 | 24 | Relegation to Gamma Ethniki |
| 4 | PAS Giannina (R) | 10 | 3 | 2 | 5 | 14 | 17 | −3 | 16 (Note: PAS Giannina was given a 3-point deduction penalty due to debts to former footballer Markos Maragoudakis, who played for the Ioannina team in the 2002–03 season, and two further 3-point deductions due to debts to former footballer Georgi Sheytanov, who also played for them in the 2002-03 season but eventually took them back from CAS.) | Relegation to Gamma Ethniki |
| 5 | Kampaniakos (R) | 10 | 2 | 2 | 6 | 13 | 20 | −7 | 16 | Relegation to Gamma Ethniki |
| 6 | Makedonikos (R) | 10 | 2 | 2 | 6 | 11 | 23 | −12 | 11 | Relegation to Gamma Ethniki |

Source: sl2.gr
Rules for classification: 1) Points; 2) Regular season position
(R) Relegated

=== Play-out Results ===
| Home \ Away | PKB | NES | KAV | PAS | KAM | MAK |
|---|---|---|---|---|---|---|
| PAOK B | — | 1–1 | 4–0 | 2–1 | 3–0 | 3–1 |
| Nestos Chrysoupoli | 1–0 | — | 2–1 | 1–0 | 3–0 | 5–1 |
| Kavala | 2–1 | 2–2 | — | 3–0 | 0–0 | 5–1 |
| PAS Giannina | 1–2 | 0–0 | 3–1 | — | 4–3 | 2–2 |
| Kampaniakos | 1–2 | 0–0 | 2–0 | 3–2 | — | 1–2 |
| Makedonikos | 0–1 | 0–2 | 0–0 | 0–1 | 4–3 | — |

Source: sl2.gr
Legend: Blue = home team win; Yellow = draw; Red = away team win.
For upcoming matches, an "a" indicates there is an article about the rivalry between the two participants.

== South Group ==
=== Teams, stadiums and locations ===
Locations of the 2025–26 Super League 2 South Group clubs

| Team | City | Stadium | Capacity |
|---|---|---|---|
| Athens Kallithea | Kallithea | Grigoris Lamprakis Stadium | 6,300 |
| Chania | Chania | Perivolia Municipal Stadium | 4,527 |
| Egaleo | Aigaleo | Stavros Mavrothalassitis Stadium | 8,217 |
| Hellas Syros | Ermoupoli | Ermoupoli Municipal Stadium | 2,500 |
| Ilioupoli | Ilioupoli | Ilioupoli Municipal Stadium | 2,000 |
| Kalamata | Kalamata | Kalamata Municipal Stadium | 5,613 |
| Marko | Markopoulo | Markopoulo Municipal Stadium | 3,000 |
| Olympiacos B | Piraeus | Rentis Training Centre | 3,000 |
| Panargiakos | Argos | Argos Municipal Stadium | 5,000 |
| Panionios | Nea Smyrni | Nea Smyrni Stadium | 11,700 |

=== Personnel and sponsoring ===
| Team | Manager | Captain |
|---|---|---|
| Athens Kallithea | (Greece) Dimitris Kalaitzidis | (Spain) Javier Matilla |
| Chania | (Greece) Nikos Anastopoulos | (Greece) Georgios Koutroumpis |
| Egaleo | (Greece) Apostolos Terzis | (Greece) Angelos Zioulis |
| Hellas Syros | (Greece) Panagiotis Christofileas | (Greece) Evripidis Giakos |
| Ilioupoli | (Greece) Ilias Sorokos | (Greece) Nikolaos Karanikas |
| Kalamata | (Greece) Alekos Vosniadis | (Greece) Georgios Pamlidis |
| Marko | (Greece) Soulis Papadopoulos | (Greece) Charalampos Pavlidis |
| Olympiacos B | (Spain) Álvaro Rubio | (France) Mathieu Valbuena |
| Panargiakos | (Greece) Sakis Papavasiliou | (Greece) Konstantinos Panagiotoudis |
| Panionios | (Greece) Vangelis Konstantinou | (Greece) Τasos Avlonitis |

=== Managerial changes ===
| Team | Outgoing manager | Manner of departure | Date of vacancy | Position in table | Incoming manager | Date of appointment |
|---|---|---|---|---|---|---|
| Kalamata | (Greece) Dimitris Spanos | Sacked | 5 May 2025 | Pre-season | (Greece) Alekos Vosniadis | 1 June 2025 |
| Panionios | (Greece) Nontas Koutromanos (caretaker) | End of tenure as a caretaker | 23 May 2025 | Pre-season | (Greece) Pavlos Dermitzakis | 24 May 2025 |
| Ilioupoli | (Greece) Markos Stefanidis | Resigned | 28 August 2025 | Pre-season | (Greece) Panagiotis Goutsidis | 4 September 2025 |
| Ilioupoli | (Greece) Panagiotis Goutsidis | Sacked | 19 September 2025 | Pre-season | (Greece) Giorgos Koudounis (caretaker) | 20 September 2025 |
| Ilioupoli | (Greece) Giorgos Koudounis (caretaker) | End of tenure as a caretaker | 30 September 2025 | 10th | (Greece) Nikos Badimas | 1 October 2025 |
| Egaleo | (Greece) Apostolos Charalampidis | Resigned | 26 September 2025 | 7th | (Greece) Konstantinos Velitzelos | 30 September 2025 |
| Chania | (Tunisia) Selim Benachour | Sacked | 30 September 2025 | 8th | (Finland) Shefki Kuqi | 12 October 2025 |
| Ilioupoli | (Greece) Nikos Badimas | Sacked | 13 October 2025 | 10th | (Greece) Apostolos Charalampidis | 14 October 2025 |
| Athens Kallithea | (Greece) Kostas Bratsos | Sacked | 14 October 2025 | 4th | (Greece) Antonis Prionas (caretaker) | 14 October 2025 |
| Athens Kallithea | (Greece) Antonis Prionas (caretaker) | End of tenure as a caretaker | 20 October 2025 | 4th | (Greece) Sokratis Ofrydopoulos | 21 October 2025 |
| Ilioupoli | (Greece) Apostolos Charalampidis | Resigned | 28 October 2025 | 10th | (Greece) Giorgos Koudounis (caretaker) | 28 October 2025 |
| Ilioupoli | (Greece) Giorgos Koudounis (caretaker) | End of tenure as a caretaker | 30 October 2025 | 10th | (Greece) Thomas Grafas | 30 October 2025 |
| Panargiakos | (Cameroon) Guy Feutchine | Sacked | 17 November 2025 | 10th | (Greece) Sakis Papavasiliou | 19 November 2025 |
| Egaleo | (Greece) Konstantinos Velitzelos | Sacked | 29 November 2025 | 7th | (Greece) Vasilis Papazisis (caretaker) | 29 November 2025 |
| Olympiacos B | (France) Romain Pitau | Sacked | 1 December 2025 | 6th | (Greece) Nikos Topoliatis (caretaker) | 1 December 2025 |
| Egaleo | (Greece) Vasilis Papazisis (caretaker) | End of tenure as a caretaker | 6 December 2025 | 7th | (Greece) Manolis Skyvalos | 6 December 2025 |
| Olympiacos B | (Greece) Nikos Topoliatis (caretaker) | End of tenure as a caretaker | 7 December 2025 | 6th | (Spain) Álvaro Rubio | 7 December 2025 |
| Chania | (Finland) Shefki Kuqi | Sacked | 19 January 2026 | 9th | (Greece) Andreas Skentzos (caretaker) | 22 January 2026 |
| Chania | (Greece) Andreas Skentzos (caretaker) | End of tenure as a caretaker | 29 January 2026 | 9th | (Greece) Nikos Anastopoulos | 29 January 2026 |
| Athens Kallithea | (Greece) Sokratis Ofrydopoulos | Sacked | 31 January 2026 | 5th | (Greece) Dimitris Kalaitzidis | 3 February 2026 |
| Egaleo | (Greece) Manolis Skyvalos | Sacked | 10 February 2026 | 7th | (Greece) Apostolos Terzis | 11 February 2026 |
| Panionios | (Greece) Pavlos Dermitzakis | Sacked | 7 March 2026 | 2nd | (Greece) Vangelis Konstantinou (caretaker) | 14 March 2026 |
| Ilioupoli | (Greece) Thomas Grafas | Resigned | 15 March 2026 | 9th | (Greece) Ilias Sorokos (caretaker) | 19 March 2026 |

=== League table ===
| Pos | Team | Pld | W | D | L | GF | GA | GD | Pts | Promotion or relegation (Note: Olympiacos B was ineligible for promotion but eligible for relegation.) |
|---|---|---|---|---|---|---|---|---|---|---|
| 1 | Kalamata | 18 | 16 | 2 | 0 | 44 | 10 | +34 | 50 | Qualification for the Play-off round |
| 2 | Panionios | 18 | 13 | 4 | 1 | 28 | 8 | +20 | 43 | Qualification for the Play-off round |
| 3 | Marko | 18 | 9 | 4 | 5 | 21 | 13 | +8 | 31 | Qualification for the Play-off round |
| 4 | Olympiacos B | 18 | 8 | 3 | 7 | 23 | 26 | −3 | 27 | Qualification for the Play-off round |
| 5 | Athens Kallithea | 18 | 7 | 5 | 6 | 21 | 17 | +4 | 26 | Qualification for the Play-out round |
| 6 | Hellas Syros | 18 | 6 | 6 | 6 | 25 | 18 | +7 | 24 | Qualification for the Play-out round |
| 7 | Egaleo | 18 | 4 | 5 | 9 | 14 | 22 | −8 | 17 | Qualification for the Play-out round |
| 8 | Ilioupoli | 18 | 4 | 3 | 11 | 14 | 29 | −15 | 15 | Qualification for the Play-out round |
| 9 | Chania | 18 | 3 | 3 | 12 | 11 | 28 | −17 | 12 | Qualification for the Play-out round |
| 10 | Panargiakos | 18 | 0 | 5 | 13 | 8 | 38 | −30 | 5 | Qualification for the Play-out round |

Source: sl2.gr
Rules for classification: 1) Points; 2) Head-to-head points; 3) Head-to-head goal difference; 4) Goal difference; 5) Goals scored; 6) Goals against; 7) Play-offs (neutral ground); 8) Draw.
(Note: Criteria 7 is only used if needed to decide champion, teams for relegation).

=== Results ===
| Home \ Away | ATK | CHA | EGA | ELS | ILP | KAL | MAR | OLB | PAR | PIO |
|---|---|---|---|---|---|---|---|---|---|---|
| Athens Kallithea | — | 2–0 | 1–1 | 1–0 | 1–1 | 1–2 | 1–1 | 2–3 | 1–1 | 0–1 |
| Chania | 1–3 | — | 1–3 | 1–1 | 0–2 | 1–2 | 1–1 | 1–0 | 2–0 | 0–2 |
| Egaleo | 1–2 | 1–0 | — | 0–2 | 3–0 | 0–2 | 0–1 | 0–3 | 0–0 | 0–1 |
| Hellas Syros | 2–0 | 4–1 | 0–0 | — | 1–1 | 1–2 | 0–2 | 0–1 | 5–0 | 1–2 |
| Ilioupoli | 0–1 | 0–2 | 1–2 | 1–2 | — | 0–3 | 1–2 | 1–0 | 1–1 | 0–1 |
| Kalamata | 2–0 | 1–0 | 1–1 | 2–0 | 5–0 | — | 2–0 | 3–1 | 5–1 | 2–0 |
| Marko | 0–1 | 2–0 | 3–0 | 1–1 | 1–0 | 2–3 | — | 2–0 | 1–0 | 1–1 |
| Olympiacos B | 0–0 | 1–0 | 2–1 | 2–2 | 2–3 | 1–4 | 1–0 | — | 2–1 | 1–1 |
| Panargiakos | 0–4 | 0–0 | 1–1 | 1–3 | 0–2 | 0–2 | 0–1 | 1–2 | — | 0–3 |
| Panionios | 1–0 | 3–0 | 1–0 | 0–0 | 2–0 | 1–1 | 1–0 | 4–1 | 3–1 | — |

Source: sl2.gr
Legend: Blue = home team win; Yellow = draw; Red = away team win.
For upcoming matches, an "a" indicates there is an article about the rivalry between the two participants.

The draw for the Play-off and Play-out rounds will take place on 2 February 2026, with first matches played on 15 February 2026.

=== Play-off round ===
In the play-offs, the first four teams in the first phase's standings participated, and they competed twice with the rest, at home and away to decide the North Group's Champion who was also promoted to next year's Super League 1. They included 6 matchdays and 6 matches for each team. The teams entered with half of the points they had won in the first phase.

| Pos | Team | Pld | W | D | L | GF | GA | GD | Pts | Promotion (Note: Olympiacos B is ineligible for promotion.) |
|---|---|---|---|---|---|---|---|---|---|---|
| 1 | Kalamata (C, P) | 6 | 4 | 1 | 1 | 7 | 2 | +5 | 38 | Promotion to Super League 1 |
| 2 | Panionios | 6 | 2 | 1 | 3 | 7 | 5 | +2 | 29 | |
| 3 | Marko | 6 | 2 | 3 | 1 | 6 | 4 | +2 | 25 | |
| 4 | Olympiacos B | 6 | 1 | 1 | 4 | 3 | 12 | −9 | 18 | |

Source: sl2.gr
Rules for classification: 1) Points; 2) Regular season position
(C) Champions; (P) Promoted

=== Play-off Results ===
| Home \ Away | KAL | PIO | MAR | OLB |
|---|---|---|---|---|
| Kalamata | — | 0–2 | 2–0 | 1–0 |
| Panionios | 0–1 | — | 0–0 | 3–0 |
| Marko | 0–0 | 2–1 | — | 1–1 |
| Olympiacos B | 0–3 | 2–1 | 0–3 | — |

Source: sl2.gr
Legend: Blue = home team win; Yellow = draw; Red = away team win.
For upcoming matches, an "a" indicates there is an article about the rivalry between the two participants.

=== Play-out round ===
The teams that took the positions 5th to 10th in the regular season participated in the play-outs. As in the play-offs, the teams started with half of the points they collected in the first phase and competed with the rest in double matches home and away (10 matches for each team). The teams that occupied the last four positions in the play outs were relegated to next year's Gamma Ethniki.

| Pos | Team | Pld | W | D | L | GF | GA | GD | Pts | Relegation |
|---|---|---|---|---|---|---|---|---|---|---|
| 1 | Hellas Syros | 10 | 6 | 3 | 1 | 15 | 6 | +9 | 33 | |
| 2 | Athens Kallithea | 10 | 5 | 4 | 1 | 11 | 5 | +6 | 32 | |
| 3 | Egaleo (R) | 10 | 6 | 2 | 2 | 13 | 9 | +4 | 29 | Relegation to Gamma Ethniki |
| 4 | Chania (R) | 10 | 4 | 1 | 5 | 7 | 8 | −1 | 19 | Relegation to Gamma Ethniki |
| 5 | Ilioupoli (R) | 10 | 1 | 2 | 7 | 4 | 14 | −10 | 13 | Relegation to Gamma Ethniki |
| 6 | Panargiakos (R) | 10 | 1 | 2 | 7 | 6 | 14 | −8 | 8 | Relegation to Gamma Ethniki |

Source: sl2.gr
Rules for classification: 1) Points; 2) Regular season position
(R) Relegated

=== Play-out Results ===
| Home \ Away | ATK | ELS | EGA | ILP | CHA | PAR |
|---|---|---|---|---|---|---|
| Athens Kallithea | — | 1–1 | 1–1 | 1–0 | 2–0 | 1–1 |
| Hellas Syros | 0–0 | — | 3–0 | 1–1 | 1–0 | 3–1 |
| Egaleo | 1–0 | 2–1 | — | 2–0 | 1–0 | 1–0 |
| Ilioupoli | 0–2 | 1–2 | 1–3 | — | 0–1 | 1–0 |
| Chania | 1–2 | 1–2 | 0–0 | 1–0 | — | 2–0 |
| Panargiakos | 0–1 | 0–1 | 3–2 | 1–1 | 0–1 | — |

Source: sl2.gr
Legend: Blue = home team win; Yellow = draw; Red = away team win.
For upcoming matches, an "a" indicates there is an article about the rivalry between the two participants.

== Super League Greece 2 Super Cup ==
28 March 2026
18:30 EEST

| Kalamata | 1–0 | Iraklis |
|---|---|---|
| Tselios 50' |

Athens Olympic Stadium, Marousi
Attendance: 12,000
Referee: Eleni Antoniou (Achaea)
