= Grafas =

Grafas (Greek: Γράφας) is a Greek surname. Notable people with the surname include:

- Dimitrios Grafas (1937–2024), Greek footballer
- Thomas Grafas (born 1970), Greek footballer and manager, son of Dimitrios
