= Iasonas Stavropoulos =

Greek footballer

Personal information
- Full name: Iason Stavropoulos
- Date of birth: 10 January 2000 (age 26)
- Place of birth: Patras, Greece
- Height: 1.76 m (5 ft 9 in)
- Position: Midfielder

Team information
- Current team: Asteras Vlachioti
- Number: 25

Youth career
- 2015–2016: Achaikos
- 2016–2017: Olympiacos
- 2017–2018: Panachaiki

Senior career*
Years	Team	Apps	(Gls)
2018–	Panachaiki	2	(0)
- * Club domestic league appearances and goals as of 10 March 2020

Iasonas Stavropoulos (Greek: Ιάσονας Σταυρόπουλος; born 10 January 2000) is a Greek professional footballer who plays as a midfielder for Super League 2 club Asteras Vlachioti.

== Career ==
=== Panachaiki ===
On 16 August 2018, Stavropoulos signed a professional contract with Panachaiki.

On 1 March 2020, Stavropoulos made his professional debut against Chania.
