= Luiz Felipe Bonetti =

Brazilian footballer

Personal information
- Full name: Luiz Felipe Bonetti Sanguini
- Date of birth: 22 March 2002 (age 24)
- Place of birth: São Paulo, Brazil
- Height: 1.73 m (5 ft 8 in)
- Position: Midfielder

Team information
- Current team: Santorini

Youth career
- AA Flamengo

Senior career*
Years	Team	Apps	(Gls)
2020–2021	Ionikos	1	(0)
2022–	Santorini	0	(0)
- * Club domestic league appearances and goals as of 9 May 2021

Luiz Felipe Bonetti Sanguini (born 22 March 2002) is a Brazilian professional footballer who plays as a midfielder for Greek club Santorini.
