= Giannis Pechlivanopoulos =

Greek footballer

Personal information
- Full name: Ioannis Pechlivanopoulos
- Date of birth: 9 June 1994 (age 32)
- Place of birth: Veria, Greece
- Height: 1.77 m (5 ft 10 in)
- Position: Left-back

Team information
- Current team: Panthrakikos
- Number: 6

Youth career
- –2010: Messouni Rodopis
- 2010–2011: Inter Milan

Senior career*
Years	Team	Apps	(Gls)
2011–2012	Niki Volos	12	(0)
2012–2013	Korinthos	14	(1)
2013–2014	Fokikos	25	(0)
2014–2015	Tyrnavos	9	(0)
2015	Panargiakos	4	(0)
2015–2016	Zakynthos	16	(0)
2016–2017	PAEEK	24	(0)
2017–2019	THOI Lakatamia	47	(4)
2019–2020	Ayia Napa	13	(0)
2020	Digenis Akritas Morphou	5	(0)
2020–2021	Rodos	16	(0)
2021–2022	Asteras Vlachioti	28	(0)
2022–2023	Egaleo	12	(0)
2023–	Panthrakikos	69	(1)
- * Club domestic league appearances and goals as of 16 June 2023

Giannis Pechlivanopoulos (Greek: Γιάννης Πεχλιβανόπουλος; born 9 June 1994) is a Greek professional footballer who plays as a left-back for Super League 2 club Panthrakikos.
