= Gauthier Clémente =

French footballer (born 1998)

Personal information
- Full name: Gauthier Clémente
- Date of birth: 28 July 1998 (age 28)
- Place of birth: Agen, France
- Position: Left winger

Youth career
- 2018–2019: Aris

Senior career*
Years	Team	Apps	(Gls)
2019–2020	Olympiacos Volos	2	(0)
2020–2022	Trikala	16	(0)
2023–	Thesprotos		
- * Club domestic league appearances and goals

Gauthier Clémente (born 27 July 1998) is a French professional footballer who plays as a left winger for Gamma Ethniki club Thesprotos.
