= Vasilios Gavriilidis =

Greek association footballer

Personal information
- Date of birth: 20 October 1992 (age 34)
- Place of birth: Zakynthos, Greece
- Height: 1.86 m (6 ft 1 in)
- Position: Midfielder

Team information
- Current team: Megas Aetos Orfano

Senior career*
Years	Team	Apps	(Gls)
–2012	Zakynthos	?	(?)
2012–2013	Kavala	?	(?)
2013	Zakynthos	?	(?)
2014–2015	Kavala	?	(?)
2015–2017	Panthrakikos	19	(0)
2017	Panserraikos	14	(0)
2017–2018	Panegialios	25	(2)
2018–2021	Kavala	36	(6)
2021–2022	Veria	31	(4)
2022–2024	Niki Volos	52	(9)
2024–2026	Kavala	46	(5)
2026–	Megas Aetos Orfano		
- * Club domestic league appearances and goals as of 22 April 2026

Vasilios Gavriilidis (Greek: Βασίλειος Γαβριηλίδης; born 20 October 1992) is a Greek professional footballer who plays as a midfielder for Gamma Ethniki club Megas Aetos Orfano.

== Club career ==
Born in Zakynthos, Greece, Vasilis made his senior debut with Football League 2 side Panthrakikos, in the 2015–16 season and had the contract with the club until July, 2017 . On 31, January 2017, he joined Panserraikos. He profoundly played for Greek clubs.

Initially signed by the Greek club Zakynthos, he had no appearance for the senior squad and followed a transfer to Kavala in 2012 playing for Gamma Ethniki . He then signed a contract of half-a-year with Greek club playing in Gamma Ethniki namely Zakynthos and remained for the club until 2013. In the mid of 2013 He was a free agent. In 2014, Gavriilidis signed a year spell with the Kavala again. In 2015, he was at Panthrakikos playing 19 games. This made the fame rise of him. whereby the Greek stayed at the club until mid-2017. He penned a deal with Greek club Panserraikos, securing major 14 appearances for the club. The gained a decent momentum for having long-enough period that he appeared for the club.

He then moved to Panegialios in 2017 and played 25 games scoring the goal twice against PAE Eginiakos and Apollon Larisas whereby the midfielder make a huge rise in market value.

Vasilios moved to Kavala, finally, playing in Football League for Kavala also acting as a skipper of the side at his third spell.

He had also appeared in Greek Football Cup or Kypello Elladas.

== Career statistics ==
=== Club ===
As of match played 3 June 2025

Appearances and goals by club, season and competition
Club	Season	League			National cup (Note: Includes Greek Cup)		Continental		Other		Total	
Club	Season	Division	Apps	Goals	Apps	Goals	Apps	Goals	Apps	Goals	Apps	Goals
Panthrakikos	2015-16	Super League Greece	5	0	–		–		–		5	0
Panthrakikos	2016-17	Football League	11	0	3	0	–		–		14	0
Panthrakikos	Total		16	0	3	0	–		–		19	0
Panserraikos	2016-17	Football League	14	0	–		–		–	14	0	
Panegialios	2017-18	Football League	24	2	1	0	–		–		25	2
Kavala	2019-20	Football League	20	3	4	0	–		–		24	3
Kavala	2020-21	Football League	17	3	–		–		–		17	3
Kavala	Total		37	6	4	0	–		–		41	6
Veria	2021-22	Super League Greece 2	33	3	1	0	–		–		34	3
Niki Volos	2022-23	Super League Greece 2	25	5	2	0	–		–		27	5
Niki Volos	2023-24	Super League Greece 2	27	4	6	0	–		–		33	4
Niki Volos	Total		52	9	8	0	–		–		60	9
Kavala	2024-25	Super League Greece 2	22	2	2	0	–		–		24	2
Career Total			198	22	19	0	–		–		217	22
