= Felipe Gomes (footballer) =

Brazilian footballer (born 1988)

Personal information
- Full name: Felipe Alexandre Januário Gomes
- Date of birth: 6 December 1988 (age 37)
- Place of birth: Vilhena, Brazil
- Height: 1.98 m (6 ft 6 in)
- Position: Goalkeeper

Youth career
- –2012: Moto Club

Senior career*
Years	Team	Apps	(Gls)
2012–2013	Doxa Katokopias	0	(0)
2013	Paulista	2	(0)
2013–2014	Apollon Smyrnis	7	(0)
2014	Ayia Napa	0	(0)
2014–2015	Thesprotos	1	(0)
2015	Kruoja	3	(0)
2015	Club San José	6	(0)
2016–2017	Panelefsiniakos	10	(0)
2017–2018	Kalamata	0	(0)
- * Club domestic league appearances and goals as of 22 December 2017

Felipe Alexandre Januário Gomes, commonly known as Felipe Gomes or Felipe (born 6 December 1988), is a Brazilian footballer who plays as a goalkeeper.

== Club career ==
Gomes started his career in the Moto Club de São Luis academies.

In 2012, he signed a contract with the Cypriot side club of Doxa Katokopias.

One year later, in 2013 he returned to Brazil for Paulista Futebol Clube.

In summer 2013 he signed a contract with the most historical club in Greece, the club of Apollon Smyrnis.

In July 2014 he returned to Cyprus for the Ayia Napa F.C. but he resigned his contract a few days later because of personal reasons and he signed a contract with Thesprotos F.C.

In January 2015 he signed a contract with the FK Kruoja Pakruojis, from Lithuania.
