= Manu Calleja =

Spanish football manager (born 1981)

Personal information
- Full name: Emmanuel Calleja Renedo
- Date of birth: 27 May 1975 (age 51)
- Place of birth: Hazas de Cesto, Spain

Senior career*
Years	Team	Apps	(Gls)
- Campiezo

Managerial career
- 1997–2002: Noja (youth)
- 2002–2003: Noja (assistant)
- 2003: Noja B
- 2003–2006: Noja
- 2007–2008: Santoña
- 2009–2010: Noja
- 2010: Union Douala
- 2011: Logroñés B
- 2011–2012: Portugalete
- 2013–2015: Balmaseda
- 2015–2016: Conquense
- 2016: Al-Nasr Salalah
- 2017: Castellón
- 2017–2018: Socuéllamos
- 2018–2020: Toledo
- 2020: Laredo
- 2021–2022: Olympiacos Volos
- 2022: Herrera
- 2022–2023: Ibiza Islas Pitiusas
- 2023: Arenas Getxo
- 2025: Gimnástica Torrelavega
- * Club domestic league appearances and goals

Emmanuel "Manu" Calleja Renedo (born 27 May 1975) is a Spanish football manager.

== Career ==
Born in Beranga, Hazas de Cesto, Cantabria, Calleja played as a senior for hometown side SD Campiezo before retiring and focusing on management. After beginning his career in charge of SD Noja's youth sides in 1997, he became an assistant of the main squad in 2002, before taking over the B-team in the following year.

In December 2003, Calleja was named manager of Noja's first team in Tercera División. He left the club in June 2006, after missing out promotion in two consecutive play-offs.

In January 2007, Calleja was named at the helm of Santoña CF also in the fourth tier. He left the club in the following year, and returned to Noja in January 2009.

In 2010, after another missed promotion, Calleja moved abroad and joined Cameroonian Elite One side Union Douala. On 23 February 2011, he returned to his home country after being appointed at UD Logroñés B in the fourth division.

On 23 May 2011, Calleja was named Club Portugalete manager. He left the club on 13 June 2012, after another play-off loss, and took over fellow division four side SD Balmaseda FC the following 20 March.

In February 2015, Calleja announced he would depart Balmaseda at the end of the season. On 2 July, he was named at the helm of UB Conquense in the same category; despite winning their group, the club also missed out promotion in the play-offs.

On 27 June 2016, Calleja left Conquense to join Al-Nasr Salalah in Oman. He left by mutual consent on 21 September, and returned to his home country the following 4 January, after being appointed manager of CD Castellón.

On 14 June 2017, Calleja was named UD Socuéllamos manager. Roughly one year later, after another play-off loss, he left the club, and was presented in charge of CD Toledo on 14 November 2018.

Calleja left Toledo on 22 July 2020, and took over Segunda División B side CD Laredo five days later. Despite qualifying the club to the newly-created Segunda División RFEF, his contract was not renewed and he left the club in May 2021.

On 25 November 2021, Calleja replaced Georgios Vazakas at the helm of Olympiacos Volos FC in the Super League Greece 2. Sacked on 1 January 2022, he switched teams and countries on 23 May after being appointed manager of Panamanian side Herrera FC, but was also dismissed on 21 September.

On 14 December 2022, Calleja was named manager of CD Ibiza Islas Pitiusas, but was sacked the following 28 March. On 29 May 2023, he was announced at Arenas Club de Getxo.

Sacked by Arenas on 31 October 2023, Calleja spent more than a year without a club before being named at the helm of Gimnástica de Torrelavega on 30 January 2025. On 6 May, after suffering relegation, he left as his contract would not be renewed.
