= Giannis Apostolidis =

Greek football player and manager (born 1988)

Personal information
- Full name: Ioannis Apostolidis
- Date of birth: 14 October 1988 (age 38)
- Place of birth: Xanthi, Greece
- Height: 1.85 m (6 ft 1 in)
- Position: Defender

Team information
- Current team: Panthrakikos (manager)

Youth career
- Skoda Xanthi

Senior career*
| Years | Team | Apps | (Gls) |
| 2004–2009 | Skoda Xanthi | | |
| 2007–2008 | → Alexandroupoli Enosi (loan) | 25 | (0) |
| 2008–2009 | → Panetolikos (loan) | 9 | (0) |
| 2009–2010 | Makedonikos | 24 | (0) |
| 2010–2012 | Panachaiki | 3 | (0) |
| 2012–2016 | Anagennisi Giannitsa | 9 | (0) |

Managerial career
- 2019–2020: Doxa Drama U19
- 2019–2020: Doxa Drama (assistant)
- 2020–2021: Veria (assistant)
- 2021–2022: Xanthi U20
- 2023: Doxa Drama
- 2023: Panthrakikos
- 2024: PAS Korinthos
- 2024–2025: Mykonos
- 2025: Kampaniakos
- 2026: Zakynthos
- 2026–: Panthrakikos
- * Club domestic league appearances and goals

Giannis Apostolidis (Greek: Γιάννης Αποστολίδης; born 14 October 1988) is a former professional football midfielder and football manager. He played for Panetolikos in the Greek third division, on loan from Skoda Xanthi and Makedonikos F.C. He is the current manager of Super League 2 club Panthrakikos.
