= Vasilios Vouzas =

Greek footballer and manager

Personal information
- Date of birth: 23 March 1966 (age 60)
- Place of birth: Mouzaki, Karditsa, Greece
- Height: 1.76 m (5 ft 9 in)
- Position: Defender

Team information
- Current team: AEK Athens U19 (manager)

Senior career*
Years	Team	Apps	(Gls)
1987–1992	Olympiacos	8	(0)
1987–1988	→ Proodeftiki (loan)		
1988–1990	→ Doxa Drama (loan)	55	(3)
1992–1993	Ionikos	24	(0)
1994–1995	Proodeftiki		
1995–1997	Edessaikos	26	(0)
1997–1999	Ethnikos Piraeus	61	(1)
1999	Panargiakos	4	(0)

Managerial career
- 2006–2008: Chaidari
- 2008: Atromitos
- 2009: Egaleo
- 2010: Ionikos
- 2010–2011: Levadiakos
- 2012: Panachaiki
- 2012: Iraklis Psachna
- 2013: Thrasyvoulos
- 2013–2014: Paniliakos
- 2014–2018: Olympiacos U19
- 2017: Olympiacos (caretaker)
- 2019–2020: Kalamata
- 2021: Olympiacos Volos
- 2022: Olympiacos Volos
- 2022: Irodotos
- 2023–2024: PAEEK
- 2024–2025: Spartakos
- 2025–: AEK Athens U19
- * Club domestic league appearances and goals

Vasilios Vouzas (Greek: Βασίλειος Βούζας; born 23 March 1966) is a Greek professional football manager and former player. He is the current manager of AEK Athens U19.

== Career ==
Born in Greece, Vouzas began playing football as a defender for Alpha Ethniki side Olympiacos F.C. in 1987. He went on loan to Alpha Ethniki rivals Doxa Drama F.C. for two seasons. He would also play in the Alpha Ethniki with Ionikos F.C., Edessaikos F.C. and Ethnikos Piraeus F.C., making a total of 149 league appearances during his career.

After he retired from playing, Vouzas became a football coach. His first professional manager experience was with Chaidari F.C. from 2006 to 2008. He managed several Greek clubs over the following years, including Atromitos F.C., Ionikos F.C., Egaleo F.C. and Levadiakos F.C.

Vouzas was appointed manager of Panachaiki in January 2012.
