= Charilaos Bikas =

Greek association footballer

Personal information
- Full name: Charilaos Bikas
- Date of birth: 8 July 1992 (age 34)
- Place of birth: Igoumenitsa, Greece
- Height: 1.80 m (5 ft 11 in)
- Position: Attacking midfielder

Team information
- Current team: Thesprotos
- Number: 10

Youth career
- 2005–2007: Spartakos Grekochori
- 2007–2009: Thesprotos

Senior career*
Years	Team	Apps	(Gls)
2009–2010	AO Mazarakias		
2010–2015	AS Rigas Fereos	93	(19)
2015–	Thesprotos	159	(25)
- * Club domestic league appearances and goals as of 16 June 2023

Charilaos Bikas (Greek: Χαρίλαος Μπίκας; born 8 July 1992) is a Greek professional footballer who plays as an attacking midfielder for Super League 2 club Thesprotos, for which he is captain.

== Club career ==
Born in Greece, Bikas made his senior debut with Thesprotos. He played a competitive match for Thesprotos in the Gamma Ethniki Play-off round on 5 May 2019, against Niki Volos, during which he played as a defensive midfielder and was shown a yellow card in the 81st minute. He further played in the Greek Football Cup in the initial season in which he played 5 games and scored 4 goals for the club. He scored against Niki Volos in Gamma Ethniki and Asteras Itea and Anagennisi Plagias.

In the 2019–20 season he scored on two occasions in 19 games and played in the Greek Football Cup.
