= Panagiotis Goutsidis =

Greek footballer (born 1965)

Personal information
- Date of birth: 8 June 1965 (age 61)
- Place of birth: Egiros, Rhodope, Greece
- Position: Defender

Senior career*
Years	Team	Apps	(Gls)
1989–1991	Skoda Xanthi	47	(0)

Managerial career
- 2007–2008: Xanthi (assistant)
- 2008–2009: Xanthi (caretaker)
- 2009–2010: Xanthi (caretaker)
- 2010–2011: Anagennisi Giannitsa
- 2011–2013: Levadiakos (assistant)
- 2013–2014: Atromitos (assistant)
- 2015: Panegialios
- 2015–2017: Platanias (assistant)
- 2017–2018: Panegialios
- 2018–2019: Asteras Tripolis (assistant)
- 2019–2020: Xanthi (assistant)
- 2020–2021: Apollon Smyrnis (assistant)
- 2021: Asteras Vlachioti
- 2021–2022: AEL
- 2022: AEL
- 2023: AEL
- 2025: Niki Volos
- 2025: Ilioupoli
- * Club domestic league appearances and goals

Panagiotis Goutsidis (Greek: Παναγιώτης Γκουτσίδης; born 8 June 1965) is a Greek professional football manager and former player.
