= Michalis Zacharopoulos =

Greek footballer

Personal information
- Full name: Michail Zacharopoulos
- Date of birth: 18 July 1995 (age 31)
- Place of birth: Kalamata, Greece
- Height: 1.78 m (5 ft 10 in)
- Position: Defensive midfielder

Team information
- Current team: Kalamata
- Number: 8

Youth career
- Kalamata

Senior career*
| Years | Team | Apps | (Gls) |
| 2014–2015 | Lamia | 0 | (0) |
| 2015 | Kalamata | 9 | (0) |
| 2015–2016 | Panegialios | 8 | (0) |
| 2016–2017 | Tsiklitiras Pylos | 24 | (1) |
| 2017– | Kalamata | 60 | (0) |
- * Club domestic league appearances and goals as of 4 April 2021

Michalis Zacharopoulos (Greek: Μιχάλης Ζαχαρόπουλος; born 18 July 1995) is a Greek professional footballer who plays as a defensive midfielder for Football League club Kalamata.
