= Dimitrios Grafas =

Greek footballer (1937–2024)

Personal information
- Date of birth: 22 March 1937
- Place of birth: Athens, Greece
- Date of death: 13 December 2024 (aged 87)
- Place of death: Athens, Greece
- Position: Forward

Senior career*
Years	Team	Apps	(Gls)
- Ethnikos Piraeus

International career
1957	Greece	1	(0)
- * Club domestic league appearances and goals

Dimitrios Grafas (Greek: Δημήτριος Γράφας; 22 March 1937 – 13 December 2024) was a Greek footballer who played as a forward for Ethnikos Piraeus. He made one appearance for the Greece national team in 1957. Grafas died in Athens on 13 December 2024, at the age of 87.
