= Georgios Vazakas =

Greek footballer and manager

Personal information
- Date of birth: 2 May 1960 (age 66)
- Place of birth: Grevena, Greece
- Height: 1.76 m (5 ft 9 in)
- Position: Midfielder

Team information
- Current team: Panargiakos (manager)

Senior career*
Years	Team	Apps	(Gls)
- Pyrsos Grevena
–1983	Pierikos		
1983–1990	Apollon Kalamarias	146	(2)
1990–1991	Niki Volos		
1991–1992	Poseidon Nea Michaniona		

Managerial career
- 1998–2000: Olympiacos Volos
- 2000–2001: Apollon Smyrnis
- 2001–2002: Chalkidona
- 2002: Ethnikos Asteras
- 2003: Kerkyra
- 2003–2004: Poseidon Neon Poron
- 2004–2005: Panionios
- 2005: Egaleo
- 2006: Kallithea
- 2006–2007: Pierikos
- 2007–2008: Ionikos
- 2008–2000: Fostiras
- 2009: Trikala
- 2010: Kalamata
- 2010: Ilioupoli
- 2010–2011: Trikala
- 2012: Olympiacos Volos
- 2012–2013: Iraklis Psachna
- 2013: Olympiacos Volos
- 2013–2015: Acharnaikos
- 2015: Trikala
- 2015–2016: Lamia
- 2016: Tyrnavos
- 2016: Apollon Smyrnis
- 2016: AEL Kalloni
- 2017: Panelefsiniakos
- 2017–2018: Anagennisi Karditsa
- 2018–2020: Aspropyrgos
- 2020: Ierapetra
- 2020–2021: Asteras Vlachioti
- 2021: Olympiacos Volos
- 2022: Pierikos
- 2022–2025: Panargiakos
- 2025: Nea Artaki
- 2026–: Panargiakos
- * Club domestic league appearances and goals

Georgios Vazakas (Greek: Γεώργιος Βαζάκας; born 2 May 1960) is a Greek professional football manager and former player.
