= Dani Ponz =

Spanish football manager

Personal information
- Full name: Daniel Ponz Folch
- Date of birth: 19 December 1973 (age 52)
- Place of birth: Sollana, Spain
- Position: Goalkeeper

Team information
- Current team: PAOK (assistant)

Senior career*
Years	Team	Apps	(Gls)
- Sollana

Managerial career
- 2005–2007: L'Alcúdia (youth)
- 2007–2009: Torre Levante (youth)
- 2009–2010: Levante (youth)
- 2010–2012: Atlético Saguntino
- 2012–2014: Alzira
- 2015–2017: Alzira
- 2017: Eldense
- 2018–2019: Atlético Saguntino
- 2020–2022: Alzira
- 2023–2024: Unionistas
- 2024–2025: Eldense
- 2025–2026: PAOK B
- 2026–: PAOK (assistant)
- * Club domestic league appearances and goals

Daniel "Dani" Ponz Folch (born 19 December 1973) is a Spanish retired footballer who played as a goalkeeper, and a manager. He is the current assistant manager of Super League Greece club PAOK.

== Career ==
Born in Sollana, Valencian Community, Ponz played for hometown side Sollana CF before retiring at the age of 29. After working as a fitness and goalkeeping coach, he began his managerial career in charge of EMFU L'Alcúdia's youth categories in 2005.

In 2010, after managing the youth sides of CF Torre Levante and Levante UD, Ponz was named manager of Tercera División side Atlético Saguntino. In July 2012, he was appointed at the helm of fellow league team UD Alzira.

Ponz departed Alzira on 21 July 2014, but returned to the club the following 11 February. On 4 July 2017, he left to become manager of CD Eldense also in division four.

Ponz was sacked by the Azulgranas on 18 December 2017, and returned to Saguntino on 6 June of the following year. He was dismissed from the latter on 16 April 2019, with five matches to go in the campaign.

On 1 August 2020, Ponz returned to Alzira for a third spell. He achieved promotion to Segunda División RFEF in his first season, and left the club on 31 May 2022; in the process, he also became the manager who managed the club in the most number of matches.

On 21 February 2023, Ponz was appointed manager of Primera Federación side Unionistas de Salamanca CF. After two seasons narrowly missing out a play-off spot, he opted to leave the club on 25 May 2024, following the expiration of his contract.

On 25 June 2024, Ponz returned to Eldense on a one-year contract, with the club now in Segunda División. His first professional match occurred on 19 August, a 2–1 home win over CD Tenerife.

On 18 January 2025, Ponz was sacked after a 4–1 loss to Cádiz CF.

== Managerial statistics ==
As of match played 14 March 2026

Managerial record by team and tenure
Team	From	To	Record								Ref
Team	From	To	G	W	D	L	GF	GA	GD	Win %	Ref
Atlético Saguntino	1 July 2010	15 May 2012	80	27	17	36	88	103	−15	33.75	
Alzira	1 July 2012	21 July 2014	92	42	24	26	124	85	+39	45.65	
Alzira	11 February 2015	4 July 2017	94	46	21	27	138	100	+38	48.94	
Eldense	4 July 2017	18 December 2017	19	8	7	4	26	17	+9	42.11	
Atlético Saguntino	6 June 2018	16 April 2019	33	16	10	7	39	21	+18	48.48	
Alzira	1 August 2020	31 May 2022	61	26	23	12	77	52	+25	42.62	
Unionistas	21 February 2023	25 May 2024	56	26	16	14	65	44	+21	46.43	
Eldense	25 June 2024	18 January 2025	26	7	6	13	26	38	−12	26.92	
PAOK B	20 October 2025	12 November 2026	32	16	6	10	48	36	+12	50.00	
Total			493	214	130	149	631	496	+135	43.41	—
