= Timos Kavakas =

Greek footballer and manager

Personal information
- Full name: Timotheos Kavakas
- Date of birth: 13 December 1972 (age 53)
- Place of birth: Thessaloniki, Greece
- Height: 1.81 m (5 ft 11 in)
- Position: Defender

Senior career*
Years	Team	Apps	(Gls)
1994–1996	Apollon Kalamarias	12	(1)
1996–1999	Kavala	43	(1)
1999–2000	Leonidio	25	(2)
2000–2002	Kavala	23	(0)
2002–2003	Patraikos	12	(0)
2004–2005	Veria	13	(1)

Managerial career
- 2008–2009: Aetos Skydra
- 2010: Veria
- 2010–2011: Platanias
- 2011: AEL (assistant)
- 2011–2012: Platanias
- 2012: Kerkyra
- 2012: AEL Kalloni
- 2013: AEL
- 2013: Panachaiki
- 2013–2014: Trikala
- 2014: Lamia
- 2014–2015: Panargiakos
- 2015: AO Chania
- 2015: Iraklis Psachna
- 2015: Panelefsiniakos
- 2015–2016: Acharnaikos
- 2016: Chalkida
- 2016–2017: Olympiacos Volos
- 2017: Asteras Amaliada
- 2017–2018: Rodos
- 2018: Chalkida
- 2018–2019: Giannitsa
- 2019: Anagennisi Giannitsa
- 2019–2020: Ierapetra
- 2021: Ierapetra
- 2021: Trikala
- 2021–2022: Karaiskakis
- 2022: Trikala
- 2022: Olympiacos Volos
- 2023: Egaleo
- 2023–2024: Kavala
- 2024–2025: Anagennisi Karditsa
- 2026: Nestos Chrysoupoli
- * Club domestic league appearances and goals

Timos Kavakas (Greek: Τίμος Καβακάς; born 13 December 1972) is a Greek professional football manager and former player.

== Career ==
Born in Thessaloniki, Kavakas began playing football as a defender for local side Apollon Kalamarias F.C. in the Beta Ethniki. In 1996, he signed with Kavala F.C., where he would make 43 Alpha Ethniki appearances in three seasons with the club.

Kavakas spent the remainder of his playing career in the Greek second and third divisions, playing for Leonidio F.C., Patraikos F.C. and Veria F.C.

After he retired from playing, Kavakas became a football coach. In January 2010, he was appointed manager of third-tier Veria, which he guided to promotion to the second-tier Football League. Six months later, he joined third-tier Platanias and was able to lead the club to promotion to the Football League. In July 2011, AEL signed him as an assistant to manager Chris Coleman. However, he returned to Platanias as manager before the 2011–12 season began. There he managed to make a stunning first round course that led to the promotion of the Cretan club in the Super League for the first time in its history. The second half of the season 2011–12 finds him in Kerkyra, who by that time was struggling to remain in the top league. He will also succeed this difficult mission. In the season 2012-13 Kavakas started coaching second division club AEL Kalloni, but in January 2013, he returned to the bench of AEL this time as a head coach until the end of the season. The financial problems and the failure to promote the team in the Super League, led to his withdrawal in June 2013. Days later he signed with Greek Football League club Panachaiki.

== Managerial statistics ==
Team	From	To	Record				
Team	From	To	G	W	D	L	Win %
Aetos Skydra	1 July 2008	18 December 2009	39	21	9	9	53.85
Veria	19 January 2010	17 April 2010	11	8	1	2	72.73
Platanias	4 October 2010	30 June 2011	26	15	5	6	57.69
Platanias	19 October 2011	20 March 2012	22	13	4	5	59.09
Kerkyra	28 March 2012	30 June 2012	4	2	2	0	50.00
AEL Kalloni	13 July 2012	9 December 2012	14	5	4	5	35.71
AEL	9 January 2013	11 June 2013	26	11	10	5	42.31
Panachaiki	11 June 2013	14 October 2013	4	0	3	1	0.00
Trikala	19 November 2013	12 February 2014	9	4	3	2	44.44
Lamia	12 February 2014	18 June 2014	12	9	2	1	75.00
Panargiakos	4 October 2014	16 February 2015	15	10	3	2	66.67
AO Chania	24 February 2015	6 March 2015	3	1	0	2	33.33
Iraklis Psachna	27 March 2015	30 June 2015	11	4	4	3	36.36
Panelefsiniakos	1 July 2015	18 August 2015					
Acharnaikos	8 December 2015	5 April 2016	14	5	2	7	35.71
Chalkida	19 July 2016	5 October 2016	2	0	1	1	0.00
Olympiacos Volos	24 November 2016	13 March 2017	13	8	4	1	61.54
Asteras Amaliada	28 August 2017	11 December 2017	9	6	1	2	66.67
Rodos	12 December 2017	30 June 2018	12	4	2	6	33.33
Chalkida	2 July 2018	17 September 2018	1	0	0	1	0.00
Giannitsa	29 October 2018	30 June 2019	21	7	7	7	33.33
Anagennisi Giannitsa	1 July 2019	1 December 2019	13	9	2	2	69.23
Ierapetra	2 December 2019	30 June 2020	13	6	5	2	46.15
Ierapetra	1 February 2021	21 June 2021	22	4	5	13	18.18
Trikala	16 September 2021	8 November 2021	4	2	1	1	50.00
Karaiskakis	23 December 2021	2 February 2022	5	1	0	4	20.00
Trikala	9 February 2022	22 February 2022	4	0	1	3	0.00
Olympiacos Volos	7 March 2022	30 June 2022	11	3	4	4	27.27
Egaleo	9 May 2023	12 June 2023	4	2	1	1	50.00
Kavala	1 July 2023	30 June 2024	34	32	1	1	94.12
Anagennisi Karditsa	1 July 2024	22 December 2025	50	39	7	4	78.00
Nestos Chrysoupoli	6 July 2026	24 September 2026	6	2	1	3	33.33
Total			434	233	95	106	53.69
