= Ilias Fyntanis =

Greek former Police Warrant Officer (born 1962)

Personal information
- Full name: Ilias Fyntanis
- Date of birth: 21 May 1962 (age 64)
- Place of birth: Kalamata, Greece

Team information
- Current team: Zakynthos (manager)

Managerial career
- Years: Team
- 2007–2008: Aias Salamina
- 2008: Ilioupoli
- 2008–2010: Aias Salamina
- 2010–2011: Panachaiki
- 2011: Vyzas Megara
- 2011–2013: Panachaiki
- 2013: Vyzas Megara
- 2013–2014: Panachaiki
- 2014–2015: Paniliakos
- 2015: Iraklis Psachna
- 2016: Panachaiki
- 2016: Ialysos
- 2017–2018: AEL
- 2020–2021: Aspropyrgos
- 2021: AEL
- 2022: Irodotos
- 2022: Asteras Vlachioti
- 2022–2023: Irodotos
- 2024: Korinthos
- 2025: Rodos
- 2025–2026: Zakynthos
- 2026: Nea Artaki
- 2026–: Zakynthos

Ilias Fyntanis (Greek: Ηλίας Φυντάνης; born 21 May 1962) is a Greek professional football manager.

He holds an UEFA Pro Coaching Licence.
