= Kampaniakos F.C. =

Kampaniakos
- Full name: Π.Α.Ε. Καμπανιακός Μ.Φ.Α.Ο.Φ. PAE Kampaniakos M.F.A.O.F.
- Founded: 1947; 79 years ago
- Ground: Kampaniakos Stadium
- Capacity: 670
- Chairman: Polydefkis Tyflioris
- Manager: Sotiris Avgeros
- League: Macedonia FCA First Division
- 2025–26: Super League Greece 2 (North Group), 9th (relegated)
- Website: www.kampaniakos.com
Home colours	Away colours

Kampaniakos F.C. is a Greek football club, based in Chalastra, Thessaloniki.

The club was founded in 1947. They played for five seasons in a row in Gamma Ethniki until season 2017–18.

== History ==
Kampaniakos M.F.A.O.F. Chalastras was founded in 1964 following the merger of local clubs "Athlitiki Enosi Chalastras" (founded in 1937 and officially recognized in 1947) and "Olympos Pyrgou" (founded in 1958). Both clubs had been participating in the regional championships of the Macedonia Football Clubs Association. The official founding year of the club is considered 1947, matching that of A.E. Chalastras, which registered with Macedonia FCA and the Hellenic Football Federation in 1955, receiving the registration number 541.

== Players ==
=== Records and statistics ===
Information correct as of the match played on 4 May 2025. Bold denotes an active player for the club.
The tables refer to Kampaniakos' players in Second Division Greece, Greek Football Cup and Third Division Greece.

==== Top 5 Most Capped Players ====
Rank	Player	Years	App
1	(Greece) Stathis Sarvanidis	2022–2026	65
2	(Greece) Giorgos Garyfallos (Greece) Nikos Katharios	2023– 2022–2026	59
3	(Greece) Filimon Frosynis	2023–2025	57
4	(Greece) Pavlos Katharios	2022–2026	54
5	(Greece) Pavlos Eppas (Greece) Giorgos Papakonstantinou	2023–2025; 2023–2026	51

==== Top 5 Goalscorers ====
Rank	Player	Years	Goals
1	(Greece) Konstantinos Kotsopoulos	2024–2025	11
2	(Greece) Dimitris Gioukoudis	2023–2024	10
3	(Greece) Rafail Pettas	2024–2025	8
4	(Greece) Giorgos Garyfallos	2023–2026	7
5	(Albania) Geron Tocka (Greece) Filimon Frosynis	2023–2024; 2023–2025	5

== Honours ==
- **Gamma Ethniki**
  - **Winners** (1): 2022–23
- **Greek FCA Winners' Championship**
  - **Winners** (1): 1974–75
- **Macedonia FCA First Division Champions**
  - **Winners** (1): 2021–22
- **Macedonia FCA Cup Winners**
  - **Winners** (2): 2019–20, 2023–24
