= Periklis Amanatidis =

Greek football manager (born 1970)

Personal information
- Date of birth: 1 August 1970 (age 56)
- Place of birth: Thessaloniki, Greece

Managerial career
- Years: Team
- 2000–2001: Apollon Krya Vrysi
- 2001–2003: Poseidon Neoi Poroi
- 2003–2004: Veria
- 2004–2005: Kozani
- 2005–2008: Agrotikos Asteras
- 2008: Giannina
- 2008: Kallithea
- 2008–2009: Makedonikos
- 2009–2010: Anagennisi Karditsa
- 2010–2011: Agrotikos Asteras
- 2012: Niki Volos
- 2013–2014: Lamia
- 2014–2015: Agrotikos Asteras
- 2015: Trikala
- 2015–2017: Aiginiakos
- 2017: Trikala
- 2017–2018: Panserraikos
- 2018–2019: Olympiacos Volos
- 2019–2020: Trikala
- 2020: Olympiacos Volos
- 2021–2023: Anagennisi Karditsa
- 2023: Kalamata
- 2023–2024: Iraklis
- 2024–2025: Pierikos
- 2025: Panthrakikos
- 2026: Zakynthos

Periklis Amanatidis (Greek: Περικλής Αμανατίδης; born 1 August 1970) is a Greek professional football manager.

== Managerial statistics ==
As of match played 6 October 2026

Team	From	To	Record				
Team	From	To	G	W	D	L	Win %
Apollon Krya Vrysi	22 December 2000	12 April 2001	18	8	3	7	44.44
Poseidon Neoi Poroi	1 July 2001	30 June 2003	72	49	9	14	68.06
Veria	18 December 2003	1 November 2004	29	12	9	8	41.38
Kozani	7 November 2004	30 June 2005	28	12	5	11	42.86
Agrotikos Asteras	1 July 2005	3 March 2008	95	46	24	25	48.42
Giannina	3 March 2008	28 May 2008	16	7	4	5	43.75
Kallithea	1 July 2008	20 November 2008	12	3	3	6	25.00
Makedonikos	23 December 2008	20 February 2009	8	3	4	1	37.50
Anagennisi Karditsa	19 March 2009	30 June 2010	43	14	17	12	32.56
Agrotikos Asteras	1 July 2010	4 April 2011	30	8	7	15	26.67
Niki Volos	6 April 2012	4 November 2012	22	13	4	5	59.09
Lamia	30 July 2013	12 February 2014	16	12	1	3	75.00
Agrotikos Asteras	5 November 2014	10 February 2015	11	4	2	5	36.36
Trikala	17 March 2015	22 August 2015	9	8	0	1	88.89
Aiginiakos	8 October 2015	24 January 2017	47	28	7	12	59.57
Trikala	1 March 2017	30 June 2017	16	14	1	1	87.50
Panserraikos	14 September 2017	1 February 2018	17	4	3	10	23.53
Olympiacos Volos	1 July 2018	30 June 2019	26	22	3	1	84.62
Trikala	1 July 2019	30 June 2020	29	17	8	4	58.62
Olympiacos Volos	13 July 2020	15 September 2020					
Anagennisi Karditsa	17 July 2021	30 June 2023	69	34	14	21	49.28
Kalamata	6 July 2023	7 November 2023	7	4	0	3	57.14
Iraklis	22 November 2023	6 March 2024	13	4	6	3	30.77
Pierikos	1 July 2024	30 June 2025	34	27	6	1	79.41
Panthrakikos	1 July 2025	10 November 2025	11	8	1	2	72.73
Zakynthos	1 September 2026	6 October 2026	5	0	2	3	0.00
Total			683	361	143	179	52.86
