= Nikos Golias =

Greek footballer

Personal information
- Full name: Nikolaos Golias
- Date of birth: 29 July 1993 (age 33)
- Place of birth: Magoula, Karditsa, Greece
- Height: 1.84 m (6 ft 1/2 in)
- Position: Centre-back

Team information
- Current team: Anagennisi Karditsa
- Number: 14

Youth career
- –2011: A.O. Karditsa

Senior career*
Years	Team	Apps	(Gls)
2011–2012	A.O. Karditsa	20	(2)
2012–2013	Anagennisi Karditsa	17	(0)
2013–2015	Aris	30	(4)
2015–2016	Anagennisi Karditsa	24	(3)
2016–2020	AEL	62	(3)
2020–2021	Apollon Larissa	19	(0)
2021–	Anagennisi Karditsa	61	(3)
- * Club domestic league appearances and goals as of 20 April 2026

Nikos Golias (Greek: Νίκος Γκόλιας; born 29 July 1993) is a Greek professional footballer who plays as a centre-back for Super League 2 club Anagennisi Karditsa, for which he is captain.

== Career ==
Golias started his career from the youth team of his hometown A.O. Karditsa in 2011. A year later he joined his other hometown club Anagennisi. On 2 July 2013, he joined Aris Thessaloniki then of Greek Super League. He managed to play in 2 games in the 1st category and stayed in the club after its relegation in the Gamma Ethniki where he had (so far) his most productive season with 28 appearances, until September 2015, when he returned to Anagennisi Karditsa in the Greek Football League. On 10 June 2016, he signed a 3-years contract with AEL. On 25 September 2016 he scored his first Super League goal in 1–0 home win against Olympiacos.
