= Thomas Grafas =

Greek footballer and manager

Personal information
- Date of birth: 10 February 1970 (age 56)
- Place of birth: Athens, Greece

Managerial career
- Years: Team
- 2009: Egaleo (caretaker)
- 2012–2013: A.E. Kifisia
- 2013–2014: Iraklis Psachna
- 2014: Apollon Kalamarias
- 2014: AEL
- 2014–2015: Pierikos
- 2015: Chania
- 2016: Chania
- 2016–2017: Veria
- 2017–2018: Sparta
- 2018: Trikala
- 2018–2019: Trikala
- 2019: Olympiacos Volos
- 2019–2021: Egaleo
- 2021–2022: Apollon Larissa
- 2022–2023: Egaleo
- 2023–2024: Diagoras
- 2024: Aiolikos
- 2024: Diagoras
- 2024–2025: Ilioupoli
- 2025: Kavala
- 2025–2026: Ilioupoli

Thomas Grafas (Greek: Θωμάς Γράφας; born 10 February 1970), son of Greek football player Dimitrios Grafas, is a Greek retired football defender and manager.

== Managerial statistics ==
Team	From	To	Record				
Team	From	To	G	W	D	L	Win %
A.E. Kifisia	1 July 2012	29 October 2013	26	14	5	7	53.85
Iraklis Psachna	29 October 2013	30 June 2014	37	13	14	10	35.14
Apollon Kalamarias	3 October 2014	1 November 2014	4	0	1	3	0.00
AEL	2 November 2014	23 December 2014	5	2	1	2	40.00
Pierikos	30 December 2014	29 April 2015	16	5	7	4	31.25
Chania	17 July 2015	29 November 2015	11	5	2	4	45.45
Chania	8 March 2016	30 June 2016	11	4	4	3	36.36
Veria	24 September 2016	26 January 2017	17	1	8	8	5.88
Sparta	4 December 2017	5 February 2018	9	4	2	3	44.44
Trikala	8 February 2018	30 June 2018	19	10	4	5	52.63
Trikala	22 November 2018	9 February 2019	12	3	6	3	25.00
Olympiacos Volos	20 July 2019	20 October 2019	6	2	3	1	33.33
Egaleo	20 November 2019	1 April 2021	17	6	4	7	35.29
Apollon Larissa	17 December 2021	30 May 2022	25	8	9	8	32.00
Egaleo	28 September 2022	4 May 2023	22	5	8	9	22.73
Diagoras	1 July 2023	4 February 2024	19	8	1	10	42.11
Aiolikos	18 March 2024	30 June 2024	10	1	2	7	10.00
Diagoras	1 July 2024	8 October 2024	6	2	1	3	33.33
Ilioupoli	11 October 2024	6 May 2025	22	4	4	14	18.18
Kavala	1 July 2025	26 October 2025	10	2	3	5	20.00
Ilioupoli	30 October 2025	15 March 2026	17	5	3	9	29.41
Total			321	104	92	125	32.40
