= Nikos Kechagias (footballer, born 1969) =

Greek footballer and manager

Personal information
- Full name: Nikolaos Kechagias
- Date of birth: 21 April 1969 (age 57)
- Place of birth: Volos, Greece
- Height: 1.83 m (6 ft 0 in)
- Position: Centre back

Youth career
- 1982–1983: Keravnos Eretria
- 1984–1988: Achilleas Farsala

Senior career*
Years	Team	Apps	(Gls)
1988–2004	Skoda Xanthi	327	(0)
2004–2005	AEL	25	(6)
Total		352	(6)

International career
1991	Greece U23		

Managerial career
- 2007–2008: Skoda Xanthi
- 2008–2009: Panetolikos
- 2010: Thrasyvoulos
- 2010: Skoda Xanthi
- 2010: Anagennisi Karditsa
- 2012: AEL
- 2014: Skoda Xanthi
- 2018–2019: Greece U17
- 2019–2021: Greece U19
- 2021–2022: Xanthi
- 2023–2026: Nestos Chrysoupoli
Medal record
Men's Football
Representing Greece
- * Club domestic league appearances and goals

Nikos Kechagias (Greek: Νίκος Κεχαγιάς; born 21 April 1969) is a Greek professional football manager and former player.

Kechagias played as a centre back and spent the majority of his playing career with Skoda Xanthi, whom he currently is the record holder for appearances with 327 games. He was part of the Greece U23 team that won the gold medal for the 1991 Mediterranean Games in Athens.

== Coaching career ==
After retiring as a player in 2005, Kechagias became the assistant coach of Skoda Xanthi. On 26 February 2007, he became first-team manager. He was replaced by Emilio Ferrera, but on 22 October 2007 he was brought back to the bench and completed the season in the 8th place. Since then, he has worked occasionally in teams of lower leagues such as Panetolikos, Thrasyvoulos Fylis and Anagennisi Karditsas. On 31 January 2012 he signed a new contract with AEL, the last team of his club career, till the end of the season, but after only 6 games in the club's bench he was replaced by Michalis Ziogas.
