= Santorini 2020 F.C. =

Greek association football club

Santorini 2020
- Full name: Santorini 2020 Football Club
- Founded: June 2020; 5 years ago
- Dissolved: 2023
- Ground: Kamari Stadium
- Capacity: 1,500
Home colours	Away colours

Santorini 2020 Football Club (Greek: Αθλητικός Σύλλογος Σαντορίνη 2020) was a Greek football club based in Santorini, Cyclades, Greece.

== History ==
The club was established in 2020, after the merger of five teams of Santorini island Panthiraikos, Thyella Kamari, A.O. Pyrgos, A.O. Lava Emporio and A.O. Karterados.
