= Panargiakos F.C. =

Association football club in Greece

Panargiakos
- Full name: Panargiakos Athlitkos Proodeftikos Omilos
- Nickname: Λύκοι (Wolves)
- Founded: 1926; 100 years ago
- Ground: Argos Municipal Stadium
- Capacity: 5,000
- Chairman: Stavros Tsiodras
- Manager: Georgios Vazakas
- League: Gamma Ethniki
- 2025–26: Super League Greece 2 (South Group), 10th (relegated)
- Website: panargeiakosfc.gr
Home colours	Away colours

Panargiakos Football Club (Greek: Παναργειακός Α.Π.Ο.) is a Greek football club based in Argos, Greece. The association was founded in 1926. The club is a founding member of the Argolida Football Clubs Association.

Panargiakos played in the First Division during the 1956–57 Panhellenic Championship and in the second level of Greek football several times: 1965–1967, 1970–1975, 1981–1982, 1990–1998, and from 2024. In 2008, they were promoted to Gamma Ethniki.

== History ==
Panargiakos was founded in 1926 as "Pan-Hellenic Association of National Physical Education". The head of this historical movement was the writer Georgios Logothetis, who had settled in Argos since 1923, coming from Spetses. From 1926 to 1933 they participated only in friendly matches. In 1933, Panargiakos was deactivated and reactivated in 1945 as "Panargiakos APO". In 1947 they participated for the first time in an official football organization.

The biggest moment of Panargiakos's history is their participation as a South Group champion in the 1957 Pan-Hellenic Championship with ten teams: from Athens to Panathinaikos, Apollonas and Panionios, from Piraeus to Olympiakos, Ethnikos and Proodeftiki, from Thessaloniki Aris and PAOK and the champions of the North Group, Doxa Dramas. In the 1990s, Panageriakos participated in the 2nd National Championship, but never won the championship of the First National Championship. In recent years the team has participated either in the local championships of Argolida or in the championship of the 4th National, but it remains the most favorite club for the Argian fans.

On May 31, 2008, they won the Cup of Amateurs defeating Niki Polygyros with 3–0 in the lead. The final was in Lamia. In the same season (2007–08) they won the championship in the 7th group of the 4th National Division and the Cup of EPC of Argolida, achieving a treble. They fought for two seasons in the C National, without success, and were again relegated to the National Division. In August 2012, for the first time in the history of the club, a second team is formed, the newly established Panargiakos who originated from academies of the wider region and compete in the A'2 category championship.

In the 2012–13 season, Panargiakos won the 4th place in the 7th Group of the National Championship.

From the 2013–14 season, the club competed in the now amateur Gamma Ethniki until the 2019–20 season, when it was relegated to the Argolida FCA A1 Division. In the 2020–21 season, local championships were suspended due to the COVID-19 pandemic. During the 2021–22 season, the club emerged as Argolida FCA champion, winning the title undefeated with only two draws, and qualified for the 2022 Greek FCA Winners' Championship promotion play-offs, successfully securing promotion back to Gamma Ethniki.

The club competed in the Gamma Ethniki for two seasons (2022–23 and 2023–24), delivering solid performances. In the 2023–24 season, under the guidance of manager Georgios Vazakas, it was crowned champion and earned promotion to the second tier of Greek football for the first time in 26 years.

The 2024–25 season resulted in the team maintaining its status in the professional divisions, finishing in 7th place following a mediocre campaign. In the 2025–26 season, Panargiakos was unable to build on its previous experience, finishing last (10th) in the Southern Group of Super League Greece 2 and suffering relegation, recording only a single win all season—a 3–2 home victory against Egaleo during the play-outs.

The team's jerseys have been previously worn by veterans of the First National Division such as Georgios Donis, Dimitrios Kapetanopoulos, Bledar Kola and Andreas Bonovas. Also, many football players in the B and C categories, such as Manolis Ioannis, Filis Spyridon, Batakos Dimitris, Da Silva Eduardo, Kapageridis Savvas, Koulianopoulos Ilias, Karabelas Giorgos, Thodis Dimitris, Pappas Pantelis.

== Supporters ==
Panargiakos enjoys strong local support in Argos as well as throughout the Argolida Regional Unit, with an official supporters' club known as "Green Wolves – Gate 2".

== Stadium ==
The club plays its home matches at the Argos Municipal Stadium, which has a seating capacity of 5,000.

== Honours ==
=== Domestic ===
- Gamma Ethniki
  - Winners (3): 1980–81, 1989–90, 2023–24
- Delta Ethniki
  - Winners (2): 1985–86, 2007–08
- Argolida FCA First Division
  - Winners (6): 1964–65, 1969–70, 1975–76, 1978–79, 2004–05, 2021–22
- Argolida FCA Cup Winners
  - Winners (9): 1975–76, 1985–84, 1985–86, 2007–08, 2012–13, 2015–16, 2018–19, 2022–23, 2023–24
- Greek Football Amateur Cup
  - Winners (1): 2007–08
