= Thesprotos F.C. =

Thesprotos
- Full name: Athlitikos Syllogos Thesprotos
- Nickname: Πλατανόφυλλο (Plane leaf)
- Founded: 1948; 78 years ago
- Ground: Igoumenitsa Municipal Stadium
- Capacity: 1,400
- League: Inactive
- 2025-26: Gamma Ethniki (Group 3), 13th (Relegated)
Home colours	Away colours

Thesprotos Football Club (Greek: Α.Σ. Θεσπρωτός Ηγουμενίτσας) is a Greek football club based in Igoumenitsa, Thesprotia, Greece. The club was founded in 1948.

== History ==
=== 1979–1988 ===
Thesprotos participated in the Corfu FCA Championships. The team won twice, securing their rise to the national categories. They were immediately downgraded to local. With the creation of a new league, FCA Thesprotia, which Thesropotos joined in 1984, they began to pick up wins. The team won the 1984–1985 championship and was promoted to the Delta Ethniki. Once again they failed to remain in the category. In 1986–1987, they won the local championship again and competed in the 1987 amateur championship without winning promotion. In 1987–1988, Thesprotos again won the local championship and again competed in the Special Amateur Championship 1988. This time they won promotion to the Delta Ethniki.

=== 1988–2003 ===
From 1988–1989 until 1994–1995, Thesprotos participated in the 4th National. They excelled for some years, but failed to advance to the Delta Ethniki. In 1994–1995 the team was downgraded to local. The following year they again won the local championship and returned to the 4th National. After three years they managed to gain promotion to the Gamma Ethniki. The relegation was immediate to the 4th National while the following year the team was relegated to the locals following a second consecutive relegation. In 2001–2002, the team won the local championship and went to the 4th National. The team was unable to stand and was relegated to the local championship.

=== 2003–2012 ===
In the following years, Thesprotos competed in the local championship without winning. In 2007–2008 the team won the championship and again climbed to the 4th National. For the next four years they competed at the 4th National. They competed in the category, but failed to advance to the 3rd National. The 2011–2012 season was once again downgraded to local.

=== 2012–2018 ===
In the 2012–2013 season, Thesprotos won the championship and participated in the 2013 Special Amateur Championship. They again went to the 3rd National Championship where they stayed for the following years. The 2014–2015 season placed fifth while the 2015–2016 season ranked 6th. The 2016–2017 season finished 9th while the 2017–2018 season again ranked 5th.

=== 2018–2019 ===
Thesprotos took the second place in the championship and qualified for the anodic barrels. They defeated Niki Volos on May 5, 2019, at Panthessal Stadium 0-1 and on May 12 at Igoumenitsa 2-0 and take the historic rise in the professional categories.

=== 2019– ===
In the 2019–20 season, Thesprotos participated in the Football League Greece (Third tier). The team placed tenth, above the relegation zone when the season ended because of the COVID-19 pandemic, just three fixtures before the end.

In the 2020–21 season, the team was still in the Football League, this time in the Northern group. They finished sixth and acquired the promotion to Superleague 2 (second tier) for the first time in their history.

Thesprotos with a team mostly consisted with youths, finished 12 out of 17 in the 2021–22 Northern Group and managed to renew his stay at Super League 2 for another season, again under coaching from Argentinian Juan Ramón Rocha.

During the 2022–23 season, the club was unable to replicate its previous strong performances and was relegated to the Gamma Ethniki, ending a 4-year tenure in professional divisions. In the 2023–24 Gamma Ethniki, Thesprotos secured its stay in the division by just two points, finishing in 9th place, while the following season (2024–25), it comfortably avoided relegation by finishing 5th. In the 2025–26 season, Thesprotos made a promising start despite being awarded two technical losses due to a squad shortage. Despite these difficulties, the management decided to continue fighting for relegation survival. However, on 5 January 2026, following the resignation of the club's president, the decision was made to withdraw Thesprotos from the Gamma Ethniki, marking the end of the team's 13-year presence in national divisions.

Thesprotos experienced the most difficult moments of its nearly 80-year history, as it failed to register for the 2026–27 Thesprotia FCA First Division championship. Despite the administration's ongoing efforts during the preceding period, it proved impossible to find players to staff the squad. Meanwhile, president Giannis Nikolaou and treasurer Fanis Ioannou submitted their resignations. The outgoing administration submitted the file with the required documentation for the club to be registered in the sports registry (mandatory for all amateur clubs and associations), thereby giving anyone interested the opportunity to take over the fortunes of the team.

== Honours ==
=== Domestic ===
Leagues:

- Delta Ethniki (Fourth Division)
  - Winners (1): 1998–99
- Corfu–Thesprotia FCA Championship (Local Championship)
  - Winners (2): 1978–79, 1981–82
- Thesprotia FCA Championship (Local Championship)
  - Winners (7): 1984–85, 1986–87, 1987–88, 1995–96, 2001–02, 2007–08, 2012–13

Cups:

- Thesprotia FCA Cup (Local Cup)
  - Winners (15): 1985–86, 1987–88, 1989–90, 1990–91, 1993–94, 1994–95, 1995–96, 1996–97, 1997–98, 1998–99, 2007–08, 2008–09, 2010–11, 2012–13, 2017–18
- Thesprotia FCA Super Cup (Local Super Cup)
  - Winners (1): 2017–18

== Notable players ==
- (Brazil) Felipe Gomes
- (Slovakia) Ján Lazorík
- (Greece) Sotiris Leontiou
- (Greece) Manolis Skoufalis
- (Greece) (Kenya) Panagiotis Apostolidis
