= Giannis Tatsis =

Greek footballer

Personal information
- Full name: Ioannis Tatsis
- Date of birth: 25 August 1972 (age 54)
- Place of birth: Ioannina, Greece
- Position: Midfielder

Team information
- Current team: Nestos Chrysoupoli (manager)

Youth career
- –1990: PAS Giannina

Senior career*
| Years | Team | Apps | (Gls) |
| 1990–1995 | PAS Giannina | 124 | (14) |
| 1995–1998 | Apollon Smyrnis | 88 | (7) |
| 1998–2000 | Paniliakos | 42 | (2) |
| 2000–2001 | PAS Giannina | 39 | (3) |
| 2001–2002 | Akratitos | 20 | (0) |
| 2002–2004 | Kallithea | 50 | (11) |
| 2004–2007 | PAS Giannina | 79 | (5) |
| 2007–2009 | Kavala | 54 | (2) |
| 2009–2010 | Pyrgetos | | |
| Total | | 496 | (44) |

Managerial career
- 2012–2015: PAS Giannina U20
- 2015–2016: Tympaki
- 2016–2017: Ergotelis (assistant)
- 2017–2018: Chania (assistant)
- 2018–2020: Platanias
- 2020: Kallithea
- 2020–2021: AEL
- 2021: Kallithea
- 2021–2022: Irodotos
- 2022–2023: Apollon Smyrnis
- 2023: Apollon Smyrnis
- 2023–2024: Panachaiki
- 2025: Kavala
- 2025–2026: Kavala
- 2026: Apollon Kalamarias
- 2026–: Nestos Chrysoupoli
- * Club domestic league appearances and goals

Giannis Tatsis (Greek: Γιάννης Τάτσης; born 25 August 1972) is a Greek professional football manager and former player.

== Managerial statistics ==
As of match played 19 October 2026

| Team | From | To | Record | | | | |
| Team | From | To | G | W | D | L | Win % |
|---|---|---|---|---|---|---|---|
| (Greece) PAS Giannina U20 | 1 July 2012 | 30 June 2015 | 15 | 4 | 1 | 10 | 26.67 |
| (Greece) AO Tybakiou | 1 July 2015 | 30 June 2016 | | | | | |
| (Greece) Platanias | 11 October 2018 | 30 June 2020 | 55 | 24 | 13 | 18 | 43.64 |
| (Greece) Kallithea | 22 September 2020 | 22 November 2020 | 0 | 0 | 0 | 0 | — |
| (Greece) AEL | 23 November 2020 | 20 January 2021 | 10 | 0 | 3 | 7 | 0.00 |
| (Greece) Kallithea | 3 April 2021 | 30 June 2021 | 16 | 7 | 3 | 6 | 43.75 |
| (Greece) Irodotos | 21 August 2021 | 4 February 2022 | 14 | 1 | 3 | 10 | 7.14 |
| (Greece) Apollon Smyrnis | 13 July 2022 | 6 February 2023 | 13 | 8 | 3 | 2 | 61.54 |
| (Greece) Apollon Smyrnis | 9 May 2023 | 30 June 2023 | 6 | 3 | 2 | 1 | 50.00 |
| (Greece) Panachaiki | 31 October 2023 | 16 October 2024 | 34 | 14 | 9 | 11 | 41.18 |
| (Greece) Kavala | 8 January 2025 | 11 June 2025 | 11 | 4 | 6 | 1 | 36.36 |
| (Greece) Kavala | 13 November 2025 | 30 June 2026 | 20 | 8 | 5 | 7 | 40.00 |
| (Greece) Apollon Kalamarias | 22 July 2026 | 22 October 2026 | 8 | 2 | 2 | 4 | 25.00 |
| Total | | | 202 | 75 | 50 | 77 | 37.13 |
