= Asteras Vlachioti F.C. =

Asteras Vlachioti
- Full name: Asteras Vlachioti Football Club
- Founded: 1950; 76 years ago
- Ground: Vlachiotis Municipal Stadium
- Capacity: 600
- Chairman: Efstratios Varelas
- Manager: Konstantinos Oikonomou
- League: Gamma Ethniki
- 2025–26: Laconia FCA First Division, 1st (promoted)
Home colours	Away colours

Asteras Vlachioti Football Club (Greek: Α.Σ. Αστήρ Βλαχιώτη Λακωνίας) is a Greek professional football club based in Vlachiotis, Laconia, Greece. The team currently competes in the Gamma Ethniki, the third tier of Greek football.

== History ==
Asteras Vlachioti was founded in 1950 and competed in the Laconia EPS Championships. They won the Laconia Championship for the first time in 1996 and in the five-year period 1996-2001, they competed in the 4th National. In 2016-17, Asteras won the second Laconia Championship and won for the first time in its history the rise to the 3rd National.

== Honours ==
=== Domestic ===
Fourth Division: 1

- 2019–20

Laconia FCA Champions: 4

- 1995–96, 2016–17, 2024–25, 2025–26

Laconia FCA Cup Winners: 5

- 1997–98, 2000–01, 2016–17, 2024–25, 2025–26
