= 2022–23 Super League Greece 2 =

Super League Greece 2
- Season: 2022–23
- Dates: 4 November 2022 – 20 June 2023
- Champions: Panserraikos (5th title); A.E. Kifisia (1st title)
- Promoted: Panserraikos; A.E. Kifisia
- Relegated: Veria; Apollon Larissa; Thesprotos; Iraklis Larissa Apollon Smyrnis; Ierapetra; Irodotos; Proodeftiki; Episkopi; PAO Rouf
- Matches: 420
- Goals: 998 (2.38 per match)
- Top goalscorer: Giannis Loukinas; Kosta Aleksić (19 goals)
- Biggest home win: Thesprotos 6–0 Apollon Larissa (23 January 2023); A.E. Kifisia 6–0 Episkopi (29 January 2023); Iraklis 6–0 Apollon Larissa (12 March 2023); PAOK B 6–1 Apollon Larissa (12 March 2023)
- Biggest away win: Apollon Pontus 0–5 Iraklis (2 May 2023); Thesprotos 0–5 Almopos Aridea (10 June 2023); Episkopi 1–5 A.E. Kifisia (4 June 2023)
- Highest scoring: Olympiacos B 5–4 Athens Kallithea (29 April 2023); PAOK B 6–1 Apollon Larissa (12 March 2023); Panathinaikos B 5–2 Apollon Larissa (7 November 2022); Apollon Smyrnis 5–2 Irodotos (2 April 2023)
- Longest winning run: Panserraikos (13 matches)
- Longest unbeaten run: Athens Kallithea (19 matches)
- Longest winless run: Apollon Larissa; Irodotos (23 matches)
- Longest losing run: Apollon Larissa; Irodotos (16 matches)

The 2022–23 Super League 2, known as Super League 2 betsson for sponsorship reasons, is the fourth season of the Super League 2, the second-tier Greek professional league for association football clubs, since the restructuring of the Greek football league system.

The season is set to start on 4 November 2022 and will finish on 20 June 2023. The league will be conducted of 30 teams and two groups, this is due to the restructure and abolishment of the Football League. The B Teams of Olympiacos, PAOK, Panathinaikos and AEK Athens will also compete in the league for a second consecutive year. B Teams, however, are ineligible for promotion or relegation.

On 22 July 2022, Greek Football Federation decided the promotion of the winners of both groups, removing the past play off system that existed last season.

The league was indefinitely suspended on 2 February 2023 by a unanimous decision from all 30 teams, as the Minister of Sports Lefteris Avgenakis announced that €1,700,000 are to be awarded to the Super League 2 teams from taxation of betting companies instead of the €5,100,000 that the teams claim to have been agreed at the start of the season, leading to great financial instability for all of the teams. On 8 February 2023, Avgenakis declined having agreed to a total funding of €5,100,000, and stated that he will not discuss with the 30 teams unless they resume the league. On 22 February 2023, the Super League Greece 2 president Leoutsakos stated that he would resign if funding was found. On 8 March 2023, after Leoutsakos' resignation, Super League 2 elected Petros Martsoukos as a new president, and agreed to resume the championship, and opting to communicate with Avgenakis for funding, as Avgenakis had set a prerequisite for funding that Leoutsakos is removed from president of Super League 2. The talks between Martsoukos and Avgenakis did not start immediately as Rokakis, the adversary of Martsoukos for the Super League 2 presidency, appealed the result of the election. The appeal was rejected on 11 April 2023. On 26 April 2023, Avgenakis and Martsoukos agreed for a total funding of €2,542,000 for the 24 Super League 2 teams, since B teams were excluded, as well as Apollon Larissa and Irodotos who had withdrawn from the league at the time.

== Team changes ==
=== From Super League Greece 2 ===
Promoted to Super League

- Levadiakos

Relegated to Gamma Ethniki

- Pierikos
- Kavala
- Olympiacos Volos
- Trikala
- Asteras Vlachioti
- Karaiskakis
- Rodos
- Zakynthos

Relegated to Local Championships

- Xanthi
- Ergotelis

=== To Super League Greece 2 ===
Relegated from Super League

- Apollon Smyrnis

Promoted from Gamma Ethniki

- Panachaiki
- Makedonikos
- Proodeftiki
- Ilioupoli
- PAO Rouf
- Iraklis Larissa

== North Group ==
=== Teams ===
Locations of the 2022–23 Super League 2 North Group clubs

Team	City	Stadium	Capacity
AEL	Larisa	Alcazar Stadium	13,108
Almopos Aridea	Aridaia	Aridea Municipal Stadium	700
Anagennisi Karditsa	Karditsa	Municipal Stadium Karditsa	3,500
Apollon Larissa	Larisa	Filippoupoli Stadium	5,000
Apollon Pontus	Polykastro	Polykastro Stadium	1,000
Diagoras	Rhodes	Diagoras Stadium	3,700
Iraklis	Thessaloniki	Kaftanzoglio Stadium	27,770
Iraklis Larissa	Larisa	Neapoli Stadium	1,000
Makedonikos	Thessaloniki	Makedonikos Stadium	8,100
Niki Volos	Volos	Panthessaliko Stadium	22,700
Panathinaikos B	Athens	Aspropyrgos Municipal Stadium	2,000
Panserraikos	Serres	Serres Municipal Stadium	9,500
PAOK B	Thessaloniki	Makedonikos Stadium	8,100
Thesprotos	Igoumenitsa	Municipal Stadium Igoumenitsa	3,500
Veria	Veria	Veria Stadium	7,000

=== Personnel and sponsoring ===
Team	Manager	Captain	Kit manufacturer	Sponsor
AEL	(Greece) Panagiotis Goutsidis	(Greece) Kostas Theodoropoulos	Legea	N/A
Almopos Aridea	(Greece) Georgios Tyriakidis	(Greece) Rafail Pettas	Errea	Loutra Pozar
Anagennisi Karditsa	(Greece) Periklis Amanatidis	(Greece) Nikos Golias	Nike	N/A
Apollon Larissa	(Greece) Michalis Bizios	(Greece) Pavlos Divanes	Givova	Psaragores Thalassa
Apollon Pontus	(Greece) Dimitris Kalaitzidis	(Greece) Dimitrios Amarantidis	Nike	N/A
Diagoras	(Greece) Angelos Digozis		Nike	Bread Factory
Iraklis	(Greece) Sakis Tsiolis	(Greece) Marios Kostoulas	Joma	N/A
Iraklis Larissa	(Greece) Christos Chatziliadis	(Greece) Alexandros Galitsios	Acerbis	N/A
Makedonikos	(Greece) Theodosis Theodosiadis	(Greece) Stelios Tsoukanis	Givova	Metrosport
Niki Volos	(Greece) Dimitris Eleftheropoulos	(Greece) Stavros Tsoukalas	Macron	Car.gr
Panathinaikos B	(Greece) Sotiris Antoniou	(Greece) Andreas Athanasakopoulos	Kappa	N/A
Panserraikos	(Greece) Pavlos Dermitzakis	(Greece) Anastasios Papazoglou	Macron	Spyropoulos
PAOK B	(Uruguay) Pablo García	(Greece) Zisis Chatzistravos	Macron	Stoiximan
Thesprotos	(Argentina) Juan Ramón Rocha	(Greece) Charilaos Bikas	Nike	Car.gr
Veria	(Greece) Anastasios Anthymiadis (caretaker)	(Greece) Michalis Boukouvalas	Zeus	Da Cristo

=== Managerial changes ===
Team	Outgoing manager	Manner of departure	Date of vacancy	Position in table	Incoming manager	Date of appointment
Panserraikos	(Greece) Giannis Giokas (caretaker)	End of tenure as caretaker	20 May 2022	Pre-season	(Greece) Dimitris Eleftheropoulos	1 July 2022
Panathinaikos B	(Spain) Javier Vázquez	End of contract	30 June 2022	Pre-season	(Bosnia and Herzegovina) Jasminko Velić	1 July 2022
Apollon Larissa	(Greece) Thomas Grafas	End of contract	30 June 2022	Pre-season	(Greece) Vangelis Moras	5 July 2022
Iraklis Larissa	(Greece) Christos Chatziliadis	Demoted to assistant manager	30 June 2022	Pre-season	(Greece) Panagiotis Dilberis	12 July 2022
Veria	(Greece) Pavlos Dermitzakis	End of contract	30 June 2022	Pre-season	(Greece) Konstantinos Anyfantakis	21 July 2022
Diagoras	(Greece) Giannis Providas	End of contract	30 June 2022	Pre-season	(Greece) Paraskevas Andralas	31 August 2022
Panathinaikos B	(Bosnia and Herzegovina) Jasminko Velić	Resigned	22 September 2022	Pre-season	(Greece) Sotiris Antoniou	24 October 2022
Panserraikos	(Greece) Dimitris Eleftheropoulos	Sacked	21 November 2022	7th	(Greece) Pavlos Dermitzakis	22 November 2022
Iraklis	(Greece) Konstantinos Georgiadis	Sacked	5 December 2022	9th	(Greece) Tasos Katsabis (caretaker)	8 December 2022
Veria	(Greece) Konstantinos Anyfantakis	Resigned	7 December 2022	7th	(Greece) Giannis Matziaridis (caretaker)	8 December 2022
Apollon Larissa	(Greece) Vangelis Moras	Resigned	10 December 2022	5th	(Greece) Stavros Diamantopoulos (caretaker)	10 December 2022
Apollon Larissa	(Greece) Stavros Diamantopoulos (caretaker)	End of tenure as caretaker	13 December 2022	6th	(Greece) Vangelis Stournaras	13 December 2022
Iraklis	(Greece) Tasos Katsabis (caretaker)	End of tenure as caretaker	14 December 2022	12th	(Greece) Sakis Tsiolis	14 December 2022
Niki Volos	(Greece) Alekos Vosniadis	Resigned	12 December 2022	8th	(Greece) Dimitris Eleftheropoulos	16 December 2022
Iraklis Larissa	(Greece) Panagiotis Dilberis	Sacked	20 December 2022	15th	(Greece) Christos Chatziliadis	20 December 2022
AEL	(Greece) Panagiotis Goutsidis	Sacked	23 December 2022	3rd	(Greece) Giannis Taousianis	23 December 2022
Veria	(Greece) Giannis Matziaridis (caretaker)	End of tenure as caretaker	29 December 2022	9th	(Greece) Kostas Velitzelos	29 December 2022
Veria	(Greece) Kostas Velitzelos	Sacked	5 January 2023	9th	(Greece) Spyros Baxevanos	6 January 2023
Apollon Larissa	(Greece) Vangelis Stournaras	Sacked	31 January 2023	14th	(Greece) Michalis Bizios	10 February 2023
Diagoras	(Greece) Paraskevas Andralas	Sacked	21 February 2023	10th	(Greece) Kostas Velitzelos	22 February 2023
AEL	(Greece) Giannis Taousianis	Sacked	14 March 2023	4th	(Greece) Panagiotis Goutsidis	14 March 2023
Makedonikos	(Greece) Giorgos Amanatidis	Resigned	27 March 2023	10th	(Greece) Angelos Zazopoulos	30 March 2023
Diagoras	(Greece) Kostas Velitzelos	Sacked	24 April 2023	10th	(Greece) Vangelis Chosadas (caretaker)	24 April 2023
Diagoras	(Greece) Vangelis Chosadas (caretaker)	End of tenure as caretaker	27 April 2023	10th	(Greece) Angelos Digozis	27 April 2023
Veria	(Greece) Spyros Baxevanos	Resigned	19 May 2023	12th	(Greece) Nikos Karydas (caretaker)	19 May 2023
Makedonikos	(Greece) Angelos Zazopoulos	Resigned	23 May 2023	11th	(Greece) Theodosis Theodosiadis	24 May 2023
Veria	(Greece) Nikos Karydas (caretaker)	Resigned	12 June 2023	12th	(Greece) Anastasios Anthymiadis (caretaker)	12 June 2023

=== League table ===
Pos	Team	Pld	W	D	L	GF	GA	GD	Pts	Promotion or relegation
1	Panserraikos (C, P)	28	20	4	4	43	13	+30	64	Promotion to Super League
2	AEL	28	18	4	6	50	19	+31	58	
3	Niki Volos	28	15	7	6	41	20	+21	52	
4	PAOK B (Note: PAOK B and Panathinaikos B are ineligible for promotion and relegation.)	28	14	7	7	51	33	+18	49	
5	Iraklis (Note: 3 points are deducted permanently from Iraklis by decision of the Court of Arbitration of the HFF. Another 3 points are deducted provisionally from Iraklis by decision of the Court of Arbitration of the HFF.)	28	15	8	5	56	22	+34	47	
6	Anagennisi Karditsa (Note: 6 points are deducted permanently from Anagennisi Karditsa by decision of the Court of Arbitration of the HFF.)	28	13	8	7	34	21	+13	41	
7	Almopos Aridea (R)	28	7	15	6	23	17	+6	36	Relegation to Local Championships
8	Makedonikos	28	8	9	11	28	30	−2	33 (Note: Head to head points (goals): Makedonikos 6 (3-2), Panathinaikos B 5 (7-8), Diagoras 4 (6-6).)	
9	Panathinaikos B	28	7	12	9	39	41	−2	33	
10	Diagoras	28	9	6	13	38	42	−4	33	
11	Apollon Pontus	28	9	5	14	21	37	−16	32	
12	Veria (R)	28	8	7	13	28	32	−4	31	Relegation to Gamma Ethniki
13	Iraklis Larissa (R)	28	7	5	16	17	42	−25	26	Relegation to Local Championships
14	Thesprotos (Note: 3 points are deducted provisionally from Thesprotos by decision of the Court of Arbitration of the HFF.) (R)	28	4	8	16	26	49	−23	17	Relegation to Gamma Ethniki
15	Apollon Larissa (Note: Apollon Larissa had been deducted 9 points for not obtaining a league license. They had additionally been deducted 21 points for penalties from not having paid players on time. The 21 points were returned to the club on 15 November 2022, after confirmation from the League that all debts towards players were paid. On 9 December 2022 the court of the Hellenic Football Federation returned the 9 league license related points to Apollon Larissa. On 24 January 2023, three points were deducted from Apollon Larissa due to debts towards Juan Villa. Ultimately, on 19 March 2023, and after suffering a further 3 point deduction, Apollon Larissa withdrew from the league and the remaining games will be ceded as 3–0 victories to the opposing teams.) (R, W)	28	3	1	24	8	85	−77	4	Withdrew

Source: sl2.gr
Rules for classification: 1) Points; 2) Head-to-head points; 3) Head-to-head goal difference; 4) Goal difference; 5) Goals scored; 6) Goals against; 7) Play-offs (neutral ground); 8) Draw.
(Note: Criteria 7 is only used if needed to decide champion, teams for relegation).
(C) Champions; (P) Promoted; (R) Relegated; (W) Withdrew

=== Results ===
Home \ Away	AEL	ALM	ANK	APL	APP	DIA	IRA	ILR	MAK	NKV	PTB	PNS	PKB	THE	VER
AEL	—	2–0	0–1	3–0 (Note: Apollon Larissa lost the game 0–3 by forfeit, as a result of their withdrawal from the championship.)	1–0	5–0	0–2	3–0	2–0	1–0	2–2	0–0	3–2	2–0	1–0
Almopos Aridea	0–2	—	1–0	3–0	0–0	0–0	2–0	0–0	0–0	2–2	0–0	0–1	0–0	1–1	2–0
Anagennisi Karditsa	2–2	2–2	—	3–0	2–0	4–1	1–0	2–0	2–0	1–0	0–2	0–0	1–2	1–0	1–0
Apollon Larissa	0–2	0–0	0–3	—	0–3	0–3	0–3	0–2	1–0	1–4	0–3	0–3	0–3	0–3	0–3
Apollon Pontus	0–3	0–1	1–0	0–1	—	0–1	0–5	1–0	3–1	2–2	2–1	0–2	1–2	0–1	0–0
Diagoras	1–0	1–1	0–2	5–0	0–1	—	2–2	0–0	0–0	1–2	4–1	0–1	2–3	2–3	1–0
Iraklis	1–1	1–1	1–1	6–0 (Note: On 12 March 2023, while the match Iraklis - Apollon Larissa was at 6–0, at the 54th minute, players of Apollon Larissa fell on the ground, stating that they are injured. The game was suspended at the expense of Apollon Larissa, and forfeited with 6–0.)	2–0	2–1	—	4–1	0–0	1–1	2–3	2–0	1–0	5–1	1–1
Iraklis Larissa	0–3	0–0	0–2	3–0	0–1	0–1	0–3	—	0–0	0–1	1–0	2–0	1–4	1–0	2–1
Makedonikos	1–3	1–0	0–0	3–0	1–2	1–0	2–0	2–3	—	2–0	1–1	0–1	3–1	2–0	0–1
Niki Volos	1–2 (Note: On 7 April 2023, while the match Niki Volos - AEL was at 1–2 and after an invasion from fans of both clubs, the match was suspended. On 5 May 2023, the match was awarded 3-0 to AEL. Niki made an appeal and on 14 June the Court gave back the one point, and annulled the first decision.)	0–0	1–1	3–0	3–0	3–0	1–0	1–0	2–0	—	0–0	3–0	2–0	2–0	1–1
Panathinaikos B	2–1	1–1	2–2	5–2	0–0	4–2	1–1	3–1	1–1	0–2	—	0–1	1–4	1–1	1–2
Panserraikos	2–1	2–0	2–0	3–0	3–0	3–1	0–2	4–0	2–0	2–0	2–0	—	0–0	1–1	2–0
PAOK B	1–0	0–1	2–0	6–1	1–1	3–3	0–3	3–0	3–3	3–1	3–1	0–1	—	2–1	1–1
Thesprotos	0–2	0–5	0–0	6–0	2–3	1–4	1–4	0–0	1–1	0–1	2–2	0–2	0–1	—	1–1
Veria	1–3	1–0	1–0	1–2	2–0	0–2	1–2	3–0	1–2	0–2	1–1	1–3	1–1	3–0	—

Source: sl2.gr
Legend: Blue = home team win; Yellow = draw; Red = away team win.
For upcoming matches, an "a" indicates there is an article about the rivalry between the two participants.

== South Group ==
=== Teams ===
Locations of the 2022–23 Super League 2 South Group clubs

Team	City	Stadium	Capacity
AEK Athens B	Spata	Spata Training Centre	3,000
A.E. Kifisia	Kifisia	Zirineio Municipal Stadium	1,650
Apollon Smyrnis	Athens	Georgios Kamaras Stadium	14,000
Athens Kallithea	Kallithea	Grigoris Lambrakis Stadium	6,300
Chania	Chania	Perivolia Municipal Stadium	4,527
Egaleo	Aigaleo	Stavros Mavrothalassitis Stadium	8,217
Episkopi	Lappa	Gallos Stadium	1,500
OF Ierapetra	Ierapetra	Ierapetra Municipal Stadium	3,000
Irodotos	Heraklion	Municipal Nea Alikarnassos Stadium	1,500
Ilioupoli	Ilioupoli	Ilioupoli Municipal Stadium	2,000
Kalamata	Kalamata	Kalamata Municipal Stadium	5,613
Olympiacos B	Piraeus	Rentis Training Centre	3,000
PAO Rouf	Athens	Rouf Municipal Stadium	1,600
Panachaiki	Patras	Kostas Davourlis Stadium	11,321
Proodeftiki	Korydallos	Nikaia Municipal Stadium	5,000

=== Personnel and sponsoring ===
Team	Manager	Captain	Kit manufacturer	Sponsor
AEK Athens B	(Greece) Sokratis Ofrydopoulos	(Greece) Vasilios Chatziemmanouil	Nike	OPAP
A.E. Kifisia	(Greece) Giorgos Petrakis	(Greece) Antonis Papasavvas	Lotto	Peugeot Besikos
Apollon Smyrnis	(Greece) Giannis Tatsis	(Albania) Fatjon Andoni	Admiral	Veneti
Athens Kallithea	(Greece) Giorgos Simos	(Greece) Michalis Kyrgias	Kappa	N/A
Chania	(Greece) Giannis Taousianis	(Greece) Christos Batzios	Saller	Mare Magnum
Egaleo	(Greece) Timos Kavakas	(Greece) Ilias Tsiligiris	Givova	Kyriakoulis
Episkopi	(Greece) Konstantinos Anyfantakis	(Greece) Antonis Stathopoulos	Lotto	Avin
OF Ierapetra	(Greece) Stefanos Xirofotos	(Ivory Coast) Dijilly Vouho	Macron	N/A
Ilioupoli	(Greece) Nikos Pantelis	(Greece) Giannis Gotsoulias	Legea	N/A
Irodotos	(Cyprus) Dimitris Dimitriou	(Greece) Minas Chalkiadakis	Stanno	N/A
Kalamata	(Greece) Antonis Mavreas (caretaker)	(Greece) Panagiotis Konstantinopoulos	Nike	Spourgitis
Olympiacos B	(Argentina) Ariel Ibagaza	(Greece) Georgios Marinos	Adidas	Stoiximan.gr
Panachaiki	(Greece) Giorgos Tantaros (caretaker)	(Greece) Lyberis Stergidis	Kappa	N/A
PAO Rouf	(Greece) Giannis Goumas	(Greece) Gerasimos Kounadis	Kappa	N/A
Proodeftiki	(Greece) Paraskevas Andralas	(Greece) Charalampos Pavlidis	Lotto	Ellagrolip

=== Managerial changes ===
Team	Outgoing manager	Manner of departure	Date of vacancy	Position in table	Incoming manager	Date of appointment
OF Ierapetra	(Greece) Staikos Vergetis	Resigned	3 May 2022	Pre-season	(Greece) Angelos Digozis	1 July 2022
Kalamata	(Albania) Arjan Bellaj (caretaker)	End of tenure as caretaker	3 May 2022	Pre-season	(Greece) Sakis Tsiolis	1 July 2022
A.E. Kifisia	(Greece) Dimitris Eleftheropoulos	End of contract	30 June 2022	Pre-season	(Greece) Giorgos Petrakis	1 July 2022
AEK Athens B	(Greece) Nikos Panagiotaras	End of contract	30 June 2022	Pre-season	(Greece) Sokratis Ofrydopoulos	1 July 2022
Episkopi	(Bosnia and Herzegovina) Jasminko Velić	End of contract	30 June 2022	Pre-season	(England) Daryl Willard	1 July 2022
Irodotos	(Greece) Vasilis Vouzas	End of contract	30 June 2022	Pre-season	(Greece) Stathis Stathopoulos	4 July 2022
Apollon Smyrnis	(Greece) Babis Tennes	End of contract	30 June 2022	Pre-season	(Greece) Giannis Tatsis	13 July 2022
Chania	(Greece) Nikos Papadopoulos	End of contract	30 June 2022	Pre-season	(Greece) Spyros Baxevanos	20 August 2022
Egaleo	(Greece) Apostolos Charalampidis	Sacked	22 August 2022	Pre-season	(Greece) Thomas Grafas	25 August 2022
Kalamata	(Greece) Sakis Tsiolis	Sacked	18 September 2022	Pre-season	(Greece) Nikos Anastopoulos	19 September 2022
Irodotos	(Greece) Stathis Stathopoulos	Resigned	24 September 2022	Pre-season	(Greece) Thomas Stratos	27 September 2022
Olympiacos B	(Argentina) Ariel Ibagaza	Resigned	27 September 2022	Pre-season	(Cyprus) Ioannis Okkas	1 October 2022
Episkopi	(England) Daryl Willard	Sacked	16 October 2022	Pre-season	(Greece) Sakis Papavasiliou	20 October 2022
Irodotos	(Greece) Thomas Stratos	Resigned	25 October 2022	Pre-season	(Greece) Alkiviadis Plousis (caretaker)	25 October 2022
Chania	(Greece) Spyros Baxevanos	Sacked	13 November 2022	13th	(Greece) Stavros Labrakis (caretaker)	13 November 2022
Irodotos	(Greece) Alkiviadis Plousis (caretaker)	End of tenure as caretaker	21 November 2022	15th	(Greece) Ilias Fyntanis	21 November 2022
Episkopi	(Greece) Sakis Papavasiliou	Sacked	20 November 2022	11th	(Greece) Panagiotis Karantathas (caretaker)	1 December 2022
Athens Kallithea	(Greece) Leonidas Vokolos	Sacked	29 November 2022	8th	(Greece) Giorgos Simos	2 December 2022
Proodeftiki	(Greece) Giannis Mangos	Sacked	4 December 2022	11th	(Greece) Antonis Nikopolidis	6 December 2022
PAO Rouf	(Greece) Isidoros Stavrianos	Sacked	3 December 2022	14th	(Greece) Lefteris Velentzas (caretaker)	3 December 2022
Episkopi	(Greece) Panagiotis Karantathas (caretaker)	End of tenure as caretaker	10 December 2022	13th	(Greece) Konstantinos Anyfantakis	10 December 2022
PAO Rouf	(Greece) Lefteris Velentzas (caretaker)	End of tenure as caretaker	14 December 2022	14th	(Greece) Giannis Goumas	14 December 2022
Kalamata	(Greece) Nikos Anastopoulos	Sacked	19 January 2023	6th	(Greece) Nikos Kakaletris (caretaker)	19 January 2023
Kalamata	(Greece) Nikos Kakaletris (caretaker)	End of tenure as caretaker	4 February 2023	7th	(North Macedonia) Ilčo Gjorgioski	4 February 2023
Apollon Smyrnis	(Greece) Giannis Tatsis	Sacked	6 February 2023	2nd	(Greece) Alekos Vosniadis	17 February 2023
Proodeftiki	(Greece) Antonis Nikopolidis	Resigned	9 March 2023	10th	(Greece) Nektarios Pantazis (caretaker)	9 March 2023
Proodeftiki	(Greece) Nektarios Pantazis (caretaker)	End of tenure as caretaker	13 March 2023	10th	(Greece) Apostolos Charalampidis	13 March 2023
OF Ierapetra	(Greece) Angelos Digozis	Resigned	28 March 2023	5th	(Greece) Vangelis Stournaras	31 March 2023
Irodotos	(Greece) Ilias Fyntanis	Resigned	31 March 2023	15th	(Cyprus) Dimitris Dimitriou	1 April 2023
Olympiacos B	(Cyprus) Ioannis Okkas	Sacked	7 April 2023	13th	(Argentina) Ariel Ibagaza	7 April 2023
Panachaiki	(Greece) Soulis Papadopoulos	Mutual agreement	10 April 2023	4th	(Greece) Giannis Vogiatzis	12 April 2023
Chania	(Greece) Stavros Labrakis (caretaker)	End of tenure as caretaker	20 April 2023	8th	(Greece) Giannis Taousianis	20 April 2023
Egaleo	(Greece) Thomas Grafas	Resigned	4 May 2023	10th	(Greece) Timos Kavakas	9 May 2023
Apollon Smyrnis	(Greece) Alekos Vosniadis	Sacked	7 May 2023	3rd	(Greece) Giannis Tatsis	9 May 2023
Kalamata	(North Macedonia) Ilčo Gjorgioski	Sacked	19 May 2023	6th	(Greece) Antonis Mavreas (caretaker)	19 May 2023
Proodeftiki	(Greece) Apostolos Charalampidis	Resigned	23 May 2023	11th	(Greece) Georgios Alexopoulos (caretaker)	23 May 2023
OF Ierapetra	(Greece) Vangelis Stournaras	Demoted to assistant manager	23 May 2023	4th	(Greece) Stefanos Xirofotos	23 May 2023
Panachaiki	(Greece) Giannis Vogiatzis	Resigned	22 May 2023	7th	(Greece) Giorgos Tantaros (caretaker)	25 May 2023
Proodeftiki	(Greece) Georgios Alexopoulos (caretaker)	Resigned	30 May 2023	11th	(Greece) Paraskevas Andralas	30 May 2023

=== League table ===
Pos	Team	Pld	W	D	L	GF	GA	GD	Pts	Promotion or relegation
1	A.E. Kifisia (C, P)	28	20	6	2	62	16	+46	66	Promotion to Super League
2	Athens Kallithea	28	20	5	3	54	22	+32	65	
3	Apollon Smyrnis (R)	28	16	8	4	37	20	+17	56	Relegation to Gamma Ethniki
4	Chania	28	14	9	5	38	18	+20	51	
5	OF Ierapetra (R)	28	14	6	8	39	25	+14	48	Relegation to Local Championships
6	Kalamata	28	13	8	7	33	16	+17	47	
7	Ilioupoli	28	11	8	9	36	32	+4	41	
8	Panachaiki (Note: 3 points are deducted permanently from Panachaiki by decision of the Court of Arbitration of the HFF. Another 3 points are deducted provisionally from Panachaiki by decision of the Court of Arbitration of the HFF.)	28	12	6	10	32	29	+3	36	
9	Olympiacos B (Note: Olympiacos B are ineligible for promotion and relegation. Olympiacos B are deducted 5 points from the HFF because of forfeiting the match against Athens Kallithea. Olympiacos B are additionally deducted 5 points from the HFF because of forfeiting the match against Kifisia.)	28	13	5	10	39	36	+3	34 (Note: Head to head results: Olympiacos B - Egaleo 2-1, Egaleo - Olympiacos B 0-0.)	
10	Egaleo	28	8	10	10	27	31	−4	34	
11	AEK Athens B (Note: AEK Athens B are ineligible for promotion and relegation.)	28	7	8	13	30	35	−5	29 (Note: Head to head results: AEK Athens B - Proodeftiki 3-0, Proodeftiki - AEK Athens B 0-0.)	
12	Proodeftiki (R)	28	8	5	15	23	37	−14	29	Relegation to Gamma Ethniki
13	Episkopi (R)	28	4	4	20	17	53	−36	16	Relegation to Gamma Ethniki
14	PAO Rouf (R)	28	3	3	22	25	60	−35	12	Relegation to Local Championships
15	Irodotos (Note: Irodotos had been deducted 9 points for not obtaining a league license. Irodotos were deducted an additional 6 points for debts on footballers. The 6 points were returned to Irodotos, and on 9 December 2022 the court of the Hellenic Football Federation returned the 9 league license related points to Irodotos. On 24 January 2023, three points were deducted from Irodotos due to debts towards Lamion Lezzo. On 3 February 2023, Irodotos had the 3 points returned. On 6 April 2023, Irodotos were deducted a further 15 points and got expelled from the championship, as the president Katerina Tsantiraki did not pay the existing debts.) (R, E)	28	1	1	26	6	68	−62	−11	Expelled

Source: sl2.gr
Rules for classification: 1) Points; 2) Head-to-head points; 3) Head-to-head goal difference; 4) Goal difference; 5) Goals scored; 6) Goals against; 7) Play-offs (neutral ground); 8) Draw.
(Note: Criteria 7 is only used if needed to decide champion, teams for relegation).
(C) Champions; (E) Expelled; (P) Promoted; (R) Relegated

=== Results ===
Home \ Away	AKB	KIF	APS	ATK	CHA	EGA	EPK	ILP	IRO	KLM	OFI	OLB	PAN	PRD	ROU
AEK Athens B	—	0–1	0–2	1–3	0–1	3–1	0–0	0–0	3–0 (Note: Irodotos lost the game 0–3 by forfeit, as a result of their expulsion from the championship.)	0–0	0–1	1–2	4–1	3–0	3–1
A.E. Κifisia	3–0	—	2–3	2–0	0–3	2–0	6–0	2–0	3–0 (Note: On 4 January 2023, while the match A.E. Kifisia - Irodotos was at 2–0, several Irodotos' players claimed to be injured, leaving the team of Irodotos to play with 6 players on the pitch. As a result, the match was forfeited at the expense of Irodotos and the game was awarded 3–0 to Kifisia.)	1–1	1–0	0–0	3–0	1–1	4–1
Apollon Smyrnis	1–0	0–0	—	1–1	1–0	0–0	3–1	2–4	5–2	0–2	1–1	1–0	1–0	3–0	1–0
Athens Kallithea	3–0	3–3	3–0	—	2–1	2–0	2–0	3–0	3–0	2–1	2–1	3–0 (Note: On 19 December 2022, during the half time of the match Athens Kallithea - Olympiacos B and with Athens Kallithea leading 2–1, Olympiacos B withdrew from the match to protest about the refereeing, and as a result did not enter the field to play the second half. Therefore, the match was awarded 3–0 to Kallithea and Olympiacos were deducted 5 points from the league and will be deducted an additional 5 points from the next season.)	3–1	1–0	3–1
Chania	1–1	0–0	2–0	0–0	—	2–1	3–2	1–0	0–0	1–0	1–1	4–2	1–2	2–0	4–0
Egaleo	1–1	0–3	0–0	1–1	0–0	—	2–3	1–1	3–0	1–1	0–2	0–0	0–2	1–1	2–1
Episkopi	1–0	1–5	0–1	0–3 (Note: Since the eligibility of Episkopi players for the league had been because of debts of the club on 4 January 2023, the match Episkopi - Athens Kallithea, scheduled for 7 January 2023, never started at the expense of Episkopi. On 14 February 2023, the match was forfeited 0–3 to Athens Kallithea.)	0–2	0–1	—	0–1	3–0	1–2	0–3	1–1	0–0	0–3	2–3
Ilioupoli	3–1	0–2	1–2	1–0	0–0	2–3	0–0	—	3–0	0–1	2–3	1–0	2–1	1–1	3–1
Irodotos	0–4 (Note: Originally scheduled to be played on 7 January 2023, one week after Irodotos' could not finish the game against A.E. Kifisia because of claiming to have the whole team injured and ending up playing with 6 players, the match did not start as Irodotos' claimed that their players had gastroentertis and asked for the match to be postponed. Despite this, AEK B brought players to the pitch normally, announced a lineup, and waited for the game to start as Super League 2 did not postpone the game. Eventually, Irodotos fielded 6 players as a starting lineup, which is less than the minimum 7, leading for the match to be forfeited at the expense of Irodotos. On 14 February 2023, the match was forfeited 0–3 to AEK B. Irodotos appealed the decision, and on 7 March Irodotos won the appeal, therefore the game was rescheduled. On 29 March 2023, the match was conducted, and AEK won 4–0.)	0–3	0–1	1–2	0–3	0–1	0–1	0–2	—	1–2	0–1	0–3	0–2	0–3	0–3
Kalamata	0–1	1–2	0–0	0–1	1–1	0–2	1–0	0–1	2–0	—	3–0	4–0	0–0	1–1	3–0
OF Ierapetra	3–2	0–1	0–1	0–1	2–0	0–0	2–0	1–1	3–0	0–0	—	2–0	2–1	2–1	4–0
Olympiacos B	1–1	0–3 (Note: On 7 January 2023, two weeks after the departure of Olympiacos B for protests against the referees at the match against Athens Kallithea, while the score was at 0–0, at the 23rd minute, Olympiacos' player Ioannis Kosti faced a red card for a harsh tackle. Following severe protests from Olympiacos players and officials, Olympiacos B withdrew from the match, and the game was forfeited at the expense of Olympiacos B. An announcement from Super League 2 regarding the result of the game is pending. On 10 March 2023, the match was forfeited 0-3 to A.E. Kifisia, with Olympiacos B additionally having a 5 point deduction from the current and the next league.)	0–0	5–4	2–0	2–1	3–0	0–1	4–0	0–2	3–2	—	4–2	1–0	2–0
Panachaiki	4–0	1–2	0–0	0–0	0–0	1–0	2–1	2–2	3–0	0–2	2–0	2–1	—	0–1	1–0
Proodeftiki	0–0	0–4	0–3	0–1	1–2	0–2	1–0	3–2	1–0	1–2	1–2	0–1	0–1	—	2–1
PAO Rouf	1–1	1–3	1–4	1–2	0–3	1–3	3–0 (Note: Originally scheduled to be played on 4 January 2023, the match PAO Rouf - Episkopi did not start as Episkopi had financial debts to the Hellenic Football Federation. Further announcement from the Hellenic Football Federation is pending for the result of the match. On 23 March 2023, the match was awarded on paper 3-0 to PAO Rouf.)	2–2	1–2	0–1	1–1	1–2	0–1	0–1	—

Source: sl2.gr
Legend: Blue = home team win; Yellow = draw; Red = away team win.
For upcoming matches, an "a" indicates there is an article about the rivalry between the two participants.

== Top scorers ==
As of 20 June 2023

19 goals

- (Serbia) Kosta Aleksić (Iraklis)
- (Greece) Giannis Loukinas (Athens Kallithea)

18 goals

- (Greece) Panagiotis Moraitis (Apollon Smyrnis)

14 goals

- (Belgium) Denzel Jubitana (Iraklis)
- (Greece) Georgios Manalis (Chania)

13 goals

- (Greece) Marios Ogkmpoe (AEL)

12 goals

- (Greece) Andrews Tetteh (A.E. Kifisia)
- (Greece) Michalis Kouiroukidis (A.E. Kifisia)
- (Ivory Coast) Dijilly Vouho (O.F. Ierapetra)
- (Greece) Christos Rovas (Kalamata)

9 goals

- (Bosnia and Herzegovina) Vladimir Bradonjić (PAOK B)
- (Guinea) Algassime Bah (Olympiacos B)

8 goals

- (Greece) Panagiotis Kynigopoulos (Athens Kallithea)
- (Italy) Said Ahmed Said (Panserraikos)
- (Greece) Stelios Tsoukanis (Makedonikos)
- (Greece) Giannis Pasas (Kalamata)
- (Equatorial Guinea) Josete Miranda (Niki Volos)
- (France) Brian Esalo (Apollon Pontus)
- (Greece) Michalis Bastakos (Ilioupoli)
- (Argentina) Iván Federico Müller (O.F. Ierapetra)

7 goals

- (Albania) Florenç Keri (Panachaiki/Iraklis Larissa)
- (Greece) Zisis Chatzistravos (PAOK B)
- (Morocco) Hicham Kanis (Panserraikos)
- (Greece) Giannis Sardelis (Panathinaikos B)
- (Greece) Lampros Politis (Chania/Anagennisi Karditsa)
- (Greece) Theodoros Tsirigotis (AEL)
- (Greece) Giannis Bourlakis (Panachaiki)
- (Greece) Ierotheos Dritsas (Thesprotos)
- (Greece) Apostolos Christopoulos (AEK Athens B)

6 goals

- (Greece) Vasilios Triantafyllakos (Ilioupoli)
- (Cameroon) Florentin Bouoli (Veria)
- (Greece) Stefanos Tzimas (PAOK B)
- (Greece) Argyris Darelas (PAOK B)
- (France) Madih Talal (A.E. Kifisia)
- (Greece) Andreas Athanasakopoulos (Panathinaikos B)
- (Egypt) Bilal Mazhar (Panathinaikos B)
- (Uruguay) Mathías Tomás (Iraklis)
- (Serbia) Bogdan Stamenkovic (Diagoras)
- (Greece) Christos Tzioras (Niki Volos)
- (Argentina) Fabricio Pedrozo (AEL)

5 goals

- (Albania) Damian Gjini (A.E. Kifisia)
- (Argentina) Nicolás Andereggen (O.F. Ierapetra/A.E. Kifisia)
- (Brazil) Demethryus (Athens Kallithea)
- (Greece) Anestis Vlachomitros (Olympiacos B)
- (Cyprus) Ioannis Kosti (Olympiacos B)
- (Greece) Giannis Parastatidis (Diagoras)
- (Greece) Michalis Manias (Diagoras)
- (Greece) Vasilios Gordeziani (PAOK B)
- (Greece) Giannis Bastianos (Egaleo)
- (Argentina) Maximiliano Cuadra (Apollon Smyrnis)
- (Albania) Alberto Simoni (Makedonikos)
- (Greece) Stefanos Athanasiadis (Anagennisi Karditsa)
- (Greece) Alexandros Arnarellis (Kalamata)
- (Greece) Vasilios Gavriilidis (Niki Volos)
- (Greece) Konstantinos Papageorgiou (AEL)

4 goals

- (Greece) Chrysovalantis Kozoronis (Anagennisi Karditsa)
- (Greece) Andreas Vlachomitros (Egaleo)
- (Greece) Michalis Kosidis (AEK Athens B)
- (Greece) Paschalis Kassos (Niki Volos)
- (Greece) Christos Liatsos (Olympiacos B)
- (Greece) Georgios Marinos (Olympiacos B)
- (Greece) Panagiotis Linardos (Panachaiki)
- (Kosovo) Besar Halimi (Apollon Smyrnis)
- (Greece) Vasilis Papadoupoulos (Almopos Aridea)
- (Greece) Rafail Pettas (Almopos Aridea)
- (Albania) Angelos Kola (Chania)
- (Ghana) Emmanuel Roe Addo (Ilioupoli)
- (Greece) Giannis Varkas (Ilioupoli)
- (Greece) Anastasios Dimitriadis (Ilioupoli)
- (Greece) Kyriakos Mazoulouxis (A.E. Kifisia)
- (Serbia) Bogdan Mandić (Proodeftiki)

3 goals

- (Greece) Georgios Zacharakis (Apollon Larissa)
- (Argentina) Ignacio Liporace (Panachaiki/Kalamata)
- (Greece) Vangelis Alexopoulos (Panachaiki)
- (Greece) Nikolaos Spyrakos (PAOK B)
- (Greece) Dimitrios Panidis (PAOK B)
- (Greece) Nikos Peios (A.E. Kifisia)
- (Greece) Manolis Kallergis (A.E. Kifisia)
- (Greece) Vasilios Fasidis (Veria)
- (Greece) Petros Orfanidis (Veria)
- (Greece) Christos Belevonis (Veria)
- (Portugal) Miguel Tavares (Panathinaikos B)
- (Greece) Savvas Siatravanis (Apollon Larissa/Makedonikos)
- (Greece) Alexandros Nikolias (AEL)
- (Greece) Dimitrios Mavrias (AEL)
- (Greece) Stathis Belevonis (Apollon Pontus)
- (Greece) Vasilios Konstantinou (Thesprotos)
- (Albania) Fatjon Andoni (Apollon Smyrnis)
- (Greece) Ilias Tsiligiris (Egaleo)
- (Argentina) Cristian Ramírez (Egaleo)
- (Greece) Athanasios Kostanasios (Athens Kallithea/Egaleo)
- (Greece) Thomas Vasiliou (Ilioupoli)
- (Greece) Spyros Venardos (PAO Rouf)
- (Greece) Michail Fragkos (Irodotos/PAO Rouf)
- (Ghana) James Ampofo (Episkopi)
- (Moldova) Victor Stînă (Panserraikos)
- (Sweden) Admir Bajrovic (Panserraikos)
- (Cyprus) Andreas Katsantonis (Panserraikos)
- (Greece) Marios Sofianos (Panserraikos)
- (Greece) Charalampos Pavlidis (Proodeftiki)
- (Brazil) Hugo Borges (Kalamata/Proodeftiki)
- (Greece) Antonis Bourselis (Chania)
- (Argentina) Juan Cataldi (O.F. Ierapetra)
- (Argentina) Rafael Blancq (O.F. Ierapetra)
- (Greece) Theodoros Vernardos (Anagennisi Karditsa)
- (Uruguay) Diego Casas (Iraklis Larissa)
- (Trinidad and Tobago) Judah García (AEK Athens B)
- (Greece) Dimitris Tsipouras (Almopos Aridea)
- (Albania) Geron Tocka (Iraklis)
- (Greece) Panagiotis Panagiotidis (Niki Volos)

2 goals

- (Brazil) Gustavo Furtado (Panathinaikos B)
- (Greece) Dimitrios Serpezis (Panathinaikos B)
- (Greece) Apostolos Martinis (Panathinaikos B)
- (Greece) Alexandros Bracjani (Makedonikos)
- (Greece) Athanasios Leonidopoulos (Makedonikos)
- (Greece) Athanasios Lioumis (Panserraikos/Makedonikos)
- (Greece) Giannis Ioannou (Veria)
- (Greece) Dimitrios Gioukoudis (Veria)
- (Ghana) Ishmael Baidoo (Veria)
- (Greece) Panagiotis Pritsas (A.E. Kifisia)
- (Greece) Nikos Vafeas (A.E. Kifisia)
- (Greece) Nikos Golias (Anagennisi Karditsa)
- (Greece) Apostolos Skondras (Anagennisi Karditsa)
- (Brazil) Elivelto (Anagennisi Karditsa)
- (Greece) Markos Nino (AEL)
- (Argentina) Luca Andrada (AEL)
- (Serbia) Alen Melunović (Iraklis)
- (Uruguay) Damián Silva (Iraklis)
- (Greece) Christos Kountouriotis (Iraklis)
- (Albania) Kristian Kushta (AEL/Iraklis)
- (Greece) Giorgos Vourgountzis (Diagoras)
- (Nigeria) Mubaraj Adeshina (Diagoras)
- (Greece) Serafim Maniotis (Diagoras)
- (Greece) Athanasios Michopoulos (Diagoras)
- (Greece) Konstantinos Boubas (Diagoras)
- (Greece) Thanasis Karamanis (Diagoras)
- (Greece) Christos Kollas (Egaleo)
- (Greece) Spyros Fourlanos (Egaleo)
- (Greece) Spyros Rousis (Thesprotos)
- (Greece) Vasilios Tsimopoulos (Thesprotos)
- (Greece) Theodoros Mingos (Thesprotos)
- (Equatorial Guinea) Óscar Siafá (Niki Volos)
- (Serbia) Luka Milunović (Niki Volos)
- (Greece) Anastasios Kritikos (Niki Volos)
- (Greece) Christos Kalousis (Apollon Larissa)
- (Greece) Giannis Michailidis (PAOK B)
- (Greece) Kyriakos Giaxis (PAOK B)
- (Greece) Omiros Syrengelas (Iraklis Larissa)
- (Greece) Dimitrios Tasioulis (Iraklis Larissa)
- (Greece) Konstantinos Chatzis (Apollon Larissa/Iraklis Larissa)
- (Greece) Efthymis Christopoulos (AEK Athens B)
- (Cyprus) Giannis Gerolemou (AEK Athens B)
- (Greece) Theodosis Macheras (AEK Athens B)
- (Greece) Andreas Tatos (Kalamata)
- (Belgium) Danny Lupano (Kalamata)
- (Brazil) Matheus Alves (Kalamata)
- (Greece) Vasilios Efthymiou (Proodeftiki)
- (Greece) Antonis Kapnidis (Proodeftiki)
- (Cyprus) Nestoras Mytidis (Panachaiki)
- (Argentina) Juan Larrea (Panachaiki)
- (Greece) Savvas Mourgos (Panserraikos)
- (Greece) Aristotelis Karasalidis (Panserraikos)
- (Greece) Konstantinos Itsios (O.F. Ierapetra)
- (Argentina) Nicolás Czornomaz (O.F. Ierapetra)
- (Greece) Vangelis Papadakis (O.F. Ierapetra)
- (Greece) Antonis Kyriazis (PAO Rouf)
- (Greece) Konstantinos Nitsakis (PAO Rouf)
- (Greece) Alexis Koutsias (Episkopi)
- (Greece) Antonis Stathopoulos (Episkopi)
- (Greece) Dimitrios Souliotis (Almopos Aridea)
- (Brazil) Felype Hebert (Ilioupoli)
- (Ghana) Sadat Karim (Apollon Smyrnis)
- (England) Adil Nabi (Athens Kallithea)
- (Greece) Nikos Kenourgios (Athens Kallithea)
- (Greece) Konstantinos Bouloulis (Athens Kallithea)
- (Spain) Omar Santana (Athens Kallithea)
- (Spain) Javier Matilla (Athens Kallithea)
- (Greece) Konstantinos Lampiris (Apollon Pontus)
- (Greece) Ilias Tselios (Chania)
- (Greece) Giannis Boutsakis (Chania)
- (Portugal) Luís Rocha (Chania)
- (Greece) Dimitrios Pinakas (Olympiacos B)
