= 2022–23 Veria NFC season =

Veria
- President: Stergios Diamantis
- Manager: Kostas Anyfantakis (22 July 2022–6 Dec 2022); Spyros Baxevanos (6 January 2023–19 May 2023); Nikos Karydas (caretaker) (19 May 2023–12 Jun 2023); Tasos Anthymiadis (caretaker) (12 Jun 2023–30 Jun 2023)
- Stadium: Veria Municipal Stadium
- Super League 2: 12th, relegated
- Greek Cup: Fifth round
Home colours	Away colours

The 2022–23 season is Veria's 4th season in existence and second appearance in the second tier of the Greek football league system, and 2nd after the foundation of the Super League 2. The contents of this article cover club activities from 1 July 2022 until 30 June 2023.

== Players ==
As of 19 June 2023

Note: Flags indicate national team as defined under FIFA eligibility rules; some limited exceptions apply. Players may hold more than one non-FIFA nationality.

No.	Pos.	Nation	Player
1	GK	GRE	Theodoros Venetikidis
2	DF	GRE	Michalis Boukouvalas (vice-captain)
4	DF	GRE	Aristotelis Kollaras
6	DF	CMR	Severin Ze Essono
7	MF	GRE	Georgios Bletsas (third-captain)
9	FW	GRE	Vasilios Fasidis (fourth-captain)
10	MF	GRE	Christos Katsoukis
11	MF	GHA	Ishmael Baidoo
13	FW	CMR	Florentin Bouoli
14	DF	GRE	Paraskevas Doumanis
15	GK	GRE	Dimitrios Ioannidis
18	MF	GRE	Alexandros Masouras

No.	Pos.	Nation	Player
19	MF	GRE	Grigoris Ziogas
20	FW	GRE	Giannis Ioannou
21	DF	GRE	Manolis Perdikis
23	MF	GRE	Konstantinos Isaakidis
26	DF	GRE	Asterios Mouchalis
27	FW	GRE	Dimitrios Gioukoudis
80	FW	GRE	Konstantinos Dermitzoglou
87	GK	GRE	Giannis Papadopoulos
88	MF	GRE	Lazaros Eleftheriadis
—	DF	GRE	Stelios Kapsalis

== Personnel ==
=== Management ===
Position	Name
Ownership	Bikas Group
President & CEO	(Greece) Stergios Diamantis
Vice President	(Greece) Stefanos Apostolidis
Member of the Board	(Greece) Giannis Sismanidis
Member of the Board	(Greece) Michalis Anthoulakis
Accountant Officer	(Greece) Kostas Sismanidis
Communication & Press Officer	(Greece) Vasilis Volkos

=== Coaching staff ===
Coaching staff
Vacant	Head Coach
Vacant	Assistant Coach
Vacant	Coach
(Greece) Theodoros Gkitkos	Goalkeeping Coach
(Greece) Anastasios Pantelidis	Physiotherapist
(Greece) Fotis Konstantakos	Physiotherapist
(Greece) Sakis Voulgaris	Caretaker
(Greece) Kosmas Rouzintsis	Caretaker
Sport management and organisation
Vacant	General Director
(Greece) Thomas Troupkos	Team Manager

Source: Veria NFC

== Transfers ==
=== In ===
No	Pos	Player	Transferred from	Fee	Date	Source
—	GK	Giannis Vantsis	Megas Alexandros	End of loan	1 July 2022	
—	CM	Antonis Pertsiounis	Megas Alexandros	End of loan	1 July 2022	
—	FW	Giorgos Vasiltsis	Megas Alexandros	End of loan	1 July 2022	
—	CB	Alexandros Papatzikos	Panelefsiniakos	Free transfer	15 July 2022	
—	RB	Paraskevas Doumanis	Ergotelis	Free transfer	21 July 2022	

=== Out ===
No	Pos	Player	Transferred to	Fee	Date	Source
—	CM	Ali Adem	Aris	End of loan	30 June 2022	
—	LW	Charles Kwateng	Ergotelis	End of loan	30 June 2022	
—	DM	Angelos Ikonomou	Free Agent	End of Contract	30 June 2022	
—	CB	Apostolos Skondras	Free agent	End of Contract	30 June 2022	
—	CB	Stergios Dimopoulos	Free agent	End of Contract	30 June 2022	
—	LW	Stelios Pozoglou	Free agent	End of Contract	30 June 2022	
—	CM	Ergys Kace	Free agent	End of Contract	30 June 2022	
—	RW	Savvas Mourgos	Free agent	End of Contract	30 June 2022	
—	GK	Markos Vellidis	Free agent	End of Contract	30 June 2022	
—	GK	Vasilis Tsimopoulos	Free agent	End of Contract	30 June 2022	
—	GK	Giannis Papadopoulos	Free agent	End of Contract	30 June 2022	
—	RW	Giannis Mystakidis	Free agent	End of Contract	30 June 2022	
—	FW	Petros Giakoumakis	Free agent	End of Contract	30 June 2022	
—	FW	Antonis Kapnidis	Free agent	End of Contract	30 June 2022	
—	FW	Giannis Pasas	Kalamata	Free	5 July 2022	
—	LB	Stavros Petavrakis	Panserraikos	Free	15 July 2022	
—	CM	Vasilis Gavriilidis	Free agent	Contract termination	15 July 2022	
—	LW	Manssour Fofana	Free agent	Contract termination	30 July 2022	

== Pre-season and friendlies ==
Win Draw Loss Upcoming fixture

21 August 2022 Friendly	Veria	1–0	Athens Kallithea	Veria
19:00				Stadium: Veria Stadium

24 August 2022 Friendly	Veria	3–2	Greece U17	Veria
18:00				Stadium: Veria Stadium

27 August 2022 Friendly	Veria	0–1	Svoronos	Veria
18:00				Stadium: Veria Stadium

31 August 2022 Friendly	PAOK B	5–1	Veria	Thessaloniki
18:00				Stadium: Makedonikos Stadium

4 September 2022 Friendly	Veria	1–0	Makedonikos	Veria
18:00				Stadium: Veria Stadium

11 September 2022 Friendly	Niki Volos	1–1	Veria	Volos
18:00				Stadium: Panthessaliko Stadium

22 September 2022 Friendly	PAS Giannina	3–1	Veria	Ioannina
18:00				Stadium: PAA

30 October 2022 Friendly	AEL	1–0	Veria	Larissa
15:00				Stadium: Alcazar Stadium

== Competitions ==
=== League table ===
Pos	Team	Pld	W	D	L	GF	GA	GD	Pts	Promotion or relegation
10	Diagoras	28	9	6	13	38	42	−4	33 (Note: Head to head points (goals): Makedonikos 6 (3-2), Panathinaikos B 5 (7-8), Diagoras 4 (6-6).)	
11	Apollon Pontus	28	9	5	14	21	37	−16	32	
12	Veria (R)	28	8	7	13	28	32	−4	31	Relegation to Gamma Ethniki
13	Iraklis Larissa (R)	28	7	5	16	17	42	−25	26	Relegation to Local Championships
14	Thesprotos (Note: 3 points are deducted provisionally from Thesprotos by decision of the Court of Arbitration of the HFF.) (R)	28	4	8	16	26	49	−23	17	Relegation to Gamma Ethniki

Source: sl2.gr
Rules for classification: 1) Points; 2) Head-to-head points; 3) Head-to-head goal difference; 4) Goal difference; 5) Goals scored; 6) Goals against; 7) Play-offs (neutral ground); 8) Draw.
(Note: Criteria 7 is only used if needed to decide champion, teams for relegation).
(R) Relegated

==== Results summary ====
Overall								Home						Away					
Pld	W	D	L	GF	GA	GD	Pts	W	D	L	GF	GA	GD	W	D	L	GF	GA	GD
28	8	7	13	28	32	−4	31	5	2	7	17	18	−1	3	5	6	11	14	−3

Last updated: 1 June 2023.
Source: Super League 2 Greece

==== Regular season matches ====
Win Draw Loss Postponed

5 November 2022 1	Veria	1–1	PAOK B	Veria
15:00 EET				Stadium: Veria Stadium; Attendance: 130

11 November 2022 2	Niki Volos	1–1	Veria	Volos
15:00 EET				Stadium: Panthessaliko Stadium

20 November 2022 3	Veria	1–2	Apollon Larissa	Veria
15:00 EET				Stadium: Veria Stadium

27 November 2022 4	Thesprotos	1–1	Veria	Igoumenitsa
15:00 EET				Stadium: Igoumenitsa Municipal Stadium

4 December 2022 5	Veria	1–0	Almopos Aridea	Veria
15:00 EET				Stadium: Veria Stadium

11 December 2022 6	Iraklis	1–1	Veria	Thessaloniki
15:00 EET				Stadium: Kaftanzoglio Stadium

18 December 2022 7	Veria	1–3	Panserraikos	Veria
15:00 EET				Stadium: Veria Stadium

21 December 2022 8	Panathinaikos B	1–2	Veria	Athens
15:00 EET				Stadium: Leoforos Alexandras Stadium

4 January 2023 9	Veria	1–2	Makedonikos	Veria
15:00 EET				Stadium: Veria Stadium

15 January 2023 11	AEL	1–0	Veria	Larissa
15:00 EET				Stadium: Alcazar Stadium

22 January 2023 12	Veria	2–0	Apollon Pontus	Veria
15:00 EET				Stadium: Veria Stadium

29 January 2023 13	Anagennisi Karditsa	1–0	Veria	Karditsa
15:00 EET				Stadium: Municipal Stadium of Karditsa

5 February 2023 14	Veria	0–2	Diagoras	Veria
15:00 EET				Stadium: Veria Stadium

12 February 2023 15	Iraklis Larissa	2–1	Veria	Larissa
15:00 EET				Stadium: AEL FC Arena

26 March 2023 16	PAOK B	v	Veria	Thessaloniki
15:00 EEST				Stadium: Makedonikos Stadium

2 April 2023 17	Veria	0–2	Niki Volos	Veria
14:45 EEST				Stadium: Veria Stadium

5 April 2023 18	Apollon Larissa	0−3 (Awarded)	Veria	Larissa
15:00 EEST				Stadium: AEL FC Arena

9 April 2023 19	Veria	3–0	Thesprotos	Veria
14:45 EEST				Stadium: Veria Stadium

13 April 2023 16	PAOK B	1–1	Veria	Thessaloniki
13:45 EEST				Stadium: Makedonikos Stadium

19 April 2023 20	Almopos Aridea	2–0	Veria	Aridaia
14:45 EEST				Stadium: Aridea Municipal Stadium

22 April 2023 21	Veria	1–2	Iraklis	Veria
13:45 EEST				Stadium: Veria Stadium

28 April 2023 22	Panserraikos	2–0	Veria	Serres
14:45 EEST				Stadium: Serres Municipal Stadium

4 May 2023 23	Veria	1–1	Panathinaikos B	Veria
13:45 EEST				Stadium: Veria Stadium

8 May 2023 24	Makedonikos	0–1	Veria	Thessaloniki
14:45 EEST				Stadium: Makedonikos Stadium

19 May 2023 26	Veria	1–3	AEL	Veria
15:15 EEST				Stadium: Veria Stadium

29 May 2023 27	Apollon Pontus	0–0	Veria	Kilkis
16:00 EEST				Stadium: Polykastro Stadium

4 June 2023 28	Veria	1–0	Anagennisi Karditsa	Veria
19:00 EEST				Stadium: Veria Stadium

11 June 2023 29	Diagoras	1–0	Veria	Rhodes
17:00 EEST				Stadium: Diagoras Stadium

18 June 2023 30	Veria	3–0	Iraklis Larissa	Veria
17:00 EEST				Stadium: Veria Stadium

=== Greek Football Cup ===
==== Third round ====
Win Draw Loss

28 September 2022 Third round	Veria	2–1 (a.e.t.)	Chania	Veria
16:00 EEST				Stadium: Veria Stadium

==== Fourth round ====
Win Draw Loss

5 October 2022 Fourth round	Thesprotos	1–2	Veria	Igoumenitsa
16:00 EEST				Stadium: Igoumenitsa Municipal Stadium

==== Fifth round ====
Win Draw Loss

19 October 2022 Fourth round	Athens Kallithea	1–0	Veria	Athens
15:00 EEST				Stadium: Grigoris Lambrakis Stadium
