= Baxevanos =

Baxevanos is a surname. Notable people with the surname include:

- Chariklia Baxevanos, Swiss actress
- Nikolaos Baxevanos (born 1999), Greek footballer
- Spyros Baxevanos (born in 1971), Greek footballer
- Vasilios Baxevanos (born 1993), Greek footballer
