= Serafim Maniotis =

Greek footballer

Personal information
- Date of birth: 17 May 2000 (age 26)
- Place of birth: Lamia, Greece
- Height: 1.85 m (6 ft 1 in)
- Position: Midfielder

Team information
- Current team: Diagoras
- Number: 5

Youth career
- 2014–2019: PAOK

Senior career*
Years	Team	Apps	(Gls)
2019–2020	PAOK	0	(0)
2019–2020	→ Veria (loan)	5	(0)
2020–2022	Levadiakos	3	(0)
2021	→ Ialysos (loan)	13	(0)
2022–	Diagoras	23	(2)

International career^{‡}
2017	Greece U17	2	(0)
- * Club domestic league appearances and goals as of 15 June 2023 ‡ National team caps and goals as of 15 March 2017

Serafim Maniotis (Greek: Σεραφείμ Μανιώτης; born 17 May 2000) is a Greek professional footballer who plays as a midfielder for Super League 2 club Diagoras.

== Career ==
=== PAOK ===
In 2014, Maniotis joined the academies of PAOK.

==== Loan to Veria ====
In 2019, Maniotis was loaned to Veria until the summer of 2020.

== Honours ==
Levadiakos

- Super League 2: 2021–22
