= Theodosis Theodosiadis =

Greek footballer

Sakis Theodosiadis
Personal information
- Full name: Theodosios Theodosiadis
- Date of birth: 23 May 1975 (age 51)
- Place of birth: Edessa, Greece
- Height: 1.84 m (6 ft 0 in)
- Position: Defender

Team information
- Current team: Platanias (manager)

Senior career*
Years	Team	Apps	(Gls)
1992–1993	Naoussa		
1993–1994	Irodotos	7	(0)
1994–2001	Trikala	153	(2)
2001–2002	→ Meteora (loan)	4	(0)
2002	Trikala	16	(1)
2003–2004	AEL	51	(1)
2004–2008	Levadiakos	84	(0)
2008–2009	Panetolikos	32	(1)
2009–2010	Trikala	27	(0)
2010–2012	Anagennisi Karditsa	26	(0)

Managerial career
- 2012–2016: Anagennisi Karditsa
- 2016–2017: Apollon Larissa
- 2018: Sparta
- 2018–2019: Veria
- 2019: Kalamata
- 2021: Diagoras
- 2022–2023: Olympiacos Volos
- 2023: Trikala
- 2023: Makedonikos
- 2023–2024: Trikala
- 2024–2025: Zakynthos
- 2025: Ethnikos Neo Keramidi
- 2025–2026: Olympiacos Volos
- 2026–: Platanias
- * Club domestic league appearances and goals as of 12 June 2016

Theodosis 'Sakis' Theodosiadis (Greek: Θεοδόσης 'Σάκης' Θεοδοσιάδης, born 23 May 1975) is a Greek professional football manager and former player.

== Career ==
Born in Edessa, Greece, Theodosiadis began playing football for Naoussa F.C. in 1992. He played for Trikala F.C. in the Delta Ethniki. In the 2008-2009 season, he played for Panetolikos and was crucial, as a starting central defender, in their bid for promotion from the third Greek division to the second Greek division.

Theodosiadis has also previously played for AEL and Levadiakos F.C. in the Super League Greece.

After retiring he started managing Anagennisi Karditsa in 2012.
