= Ishmael Baidoo =

Ghanaian footballer (born 1998)

Personal information
- Date of birth: 1 December 1998 (age 27)
- Place of birth: Accra, Ghana
- Height: 1.65 m (5 ft 5 in)
- Position: Winger

Youth career
- Aspire Academy

Senior career*
Years	Team	Apps	(Gls)
2017–2019	Septemvri Sofia	52	(5)
2019–2021	Górnik Zabrze II	11	(5)
2019–2021	Górnik Zabrze	14	(0)
2020	→ Železiarne Podbrezová (loan)	0	(0)
2020–2021	→ Pogoń Siedlce (loan)	34	(8)
2021–2023	Veria	12	(2)
2024–2025	Weszło Warsaw	49	(31)
2025–2026	Chełmianka Chełm	9	(1)
2026	KP Starogard Gdański	13	(2)
- * Club domestic league appearances and goals as of 16:21, 9 July 2026 (UTC)

Ishmael Baidoo (born 1 December 1998) is a Ghanaian professional footballer who plays as a winger.

== Club career ==
=== Septemvri Sofia ===
In the beginning of 2017, Baidoo joined the Bulgarian team Septemvri Sofia. He made his debut in Second League on 17 April 2017 against Vitosha Bistritsa, scoring once in a 2–1 loss.

He made his Bulgarian top-flight debut on 17 July 2017, in the first league game of the season against Dunav Ruse. On 24 April 2017, he scored his first goal during that campaign, in a league match against Lokomotiv Plovdiv.

=== Górnik Zabrze ===
On 5 February 2019, he signed a three-and-a-half-year deal with Polish club Górnik Zabrze with the option of prolonging it. On 22 February 2020, it was confirmed he had joined FK Železiarne Podbrezová in Slovakia on loan for the rest of the season. On 4 September 2020, he joined Pogoń Siedlce on a season-long loan.

== International career ==
In 2015, Baidoo was called up to the 26-man provisional Ghana U17 squad for the WAFU U17 tournament.

== Career statistics ==
As of match played 16 May 2026

Appearances and goals by club, season and competition
Club	Season	League			National cup (Note: Includes Bulgarian Cup, Polish Cup, Greek Cup)		Europe		Other		Total	
Club	Season	Division	Apps	Goals	Apps	Goals	Apps	Goals	Apps	Goals	Apps	Goals
Septemvri Sofia	2016–17	Second League	7	1	0	0	—		1 (Note: Appearance in Second League play-offs)	0	8	1
Septemvri Sofia	2017–18	First League	26	1	2	0	—		0	0	28	1
Septemvri Sofia	2018–19	First League	19	3	1	0	—		0	0	20	3
Septemvri Sofia	Total		52	5	3	0	—		1	0	56	5
Górnik Zabrze	2018–19	Ekstraklasa	5	0	1	0	—		—		6	0
Górnik Zabrze	2019–20	Ekstraklasa	6	0	1	1	—		—		7	1
Górnik Zabrze	2021–22	Ekstraklasa	3	0	0	0	—		—		3	0
Górnik Zabrze	Total		14	0	2	1	—		—		16	1
Górnik Zabrze II	2018–19	III liga, group III	2	1	—		—		—		2	1
Górnik Zabrze II	2019–20	III liga, group III	5	1	—		—		—		5	1
Górnik Zabrze II	2020–21	III liga, group III	4	3	—		—		—		4	3
Górnik Zabrze II	Total		11	5	—		—		—		11	5
Železiarne Podbrezová (loan)	2019–20	2. Liga	0	0	—		—		—		0	0
Pogoń Siedlce (loan)	2020–21	II liga	34	8	1	0	—		—		35	8
Veria	2021–22	Super League Greece 2	1	0	1	0	—		—		2	0
Veria	2022–23	Super League Greece 2	11	2	0	0	—		—		11	2
Veria	Total		12	2	1	0	—		—		13	2
Weszło Warsaw	2023–24	IV liga Masovia	18	11	—		—		—		18	11
Weszło Warsaw	2024–25	IV liga Masovia	31	20	—		—		—		31	20
Weszło Warsaw	Total		49	31	—		—		—		49	31
Chełmianka Chełm	2025–26	III liga, group IV	9	1	—		—		—		9	1
KP Starogard Gdański	2025–26	IV liga Pomerania	13	2	—		—		—		13	2
Career total			194	54	7	1	0	0	1	0	202	55
