= Paraskevas Doumanis =

Greek footballer

Paris Doumanis
Personal information
- Full name: Paraskevas Doumanis
- Date of birth: 30 October 2000 (age 26)
- Place of birth: Veria, Greece
- Height: 1.74 m (5 ft 9 in)
- Position: Right-back

Team information
- Current team: Panthrakikos
- Number: 24

Youth career
- 2015–2021: Olympiacos

Senior career*
Years	Team	Apps	(Gls)
2017–2021	Olympiacos	0	(0)
2021–2022	Ergotelis	33	(0)
2022–2023	Veria	21	(0)
2023–2024	Anagennisi Karditsa	26	(0)
2024–2026	Kampaniakos	54	(3)
2026–	Panthrakikos	0	(0)

International career^{‡}
2017	Greece U17	5	(0)
- * Club domestic league appearances and goals as of 26 April 2026 ‡ National team caps and goals as of 15 March 2017

Paraskevas "Paris" Doumanis (Greek: Παρασκευάς "Πάρης" Ντουμάνης; born 30 October 2000) is a Greek professional footballer who plays as a right-back for Super League 2 club Panthrakikos.
