= Stathis Stathopoulos =

Greek footballer

Personal information
- Full name: Efstathios Stathopoulos
- Date of birth: 2 May 1960 (age 66)
- Place of birth: Athens, Greece

Managerial career
- Years: Team
- 1992–1994: Athinaikos
- 1994–1995: Levadiakos
- 1995: Ialysos
- 1995–1996: Panargiakos
- 1997: Doxa Vyronas
- 1997: Ethnikos Piraeus
- 1997–1998: Athinaikos
- 1998: Panelefsiniakos
- 1999: Panelefsiniakos
- 1999: Ethnikos Piraeus
- 2000–2002: Akratitos
- 2005: Ethnikos Asteras
- 2005–2006: Panetolikos
- 2007–2008: Koropi
- 2009–2010: Kallithea
- 2011–2012: Apollon Smyrnis
- 2012–2013: Thrasyvoulos
- 2016: Panachaiki
- 2017: Kallithea
- 2018–2019: A.O. Ypato
- 2022: Irodotos

Stathis Stathopoulos (Greek: Στάθης Σταθόπουλος; born 8 November 1958) is a Greek professional football manager.
