= Minas Chalkiadakis =

Greek footballer (born 1995)

Personal information
- Full name: Minas Fazos Chalkiadakis
- Date of birth: 5 February 1995 (age 31)
- Place of birth: Heraklion, Crete, Greece
- Height: 1.86 m (6 ft 1 in)
- Position: Forward

Team information
- Current team: Ethnikos Piraeus

Youth career
- 2005–2012: Athlopolis Heraklion
- 2012–2015: Panathinaikos

Senior career*
Years	Team	Apps	(Gls)
2015–2016	AEZ Zakakiou	31	(7)
2016–2017	Panthrakikos	8	(1)
2016–2017	Anagennisi Karditsa	11	(0)
2017–2019	Chania	36	(9)
2019–2020	Botoșani	8	(0)
2021–2023	Irodotos	40	(7)
2023–2024	Othellos Athienou	0	(0)
2023	→ PAEEK (loan)	9	(0)
2024–2025	Panachaiki	4	(0)
2025	Sevlievo	5	(0)
2026–	Ethnikos Piraeus		
- * Club domestic league appearances and goals as of 17 October 2025

Minas Chalkiadakis (Greek: Μηνάς Χαλκιαδάκης; born 5 February 1995) is a Greek professional footballer who plays as a forward for Gamma Ethniki club Ethnikos Piraeus.

== Career ==
He started his career with Panathinaikos where he was a captain of the U20 team. In his career, he played for teams such as AEZ Zakakiou, Anagennisi Karditsa, PAE Chania, FC Botoșani and Sevlievo among others.
