= Dimitrios Gioukoudis =

Greek footballer

Personal information
- Full name: Dimitrios Gioukoudis
- Date of birth: 24 August 1997 (age 29)
- Place of birth: Epanomi, Greece
- Height: 1.85 m (6 ft 1 in)
- Position: Forward

Team information
- Current team: Veria
- Number: 27

Senior career*
Years	Team	Apps	(Gls)
2021–2022	Almopos Aridea	38	(3)
2023–	Veria	16	(1)
- * Club domestic league appearances and goals as of 16 June 2023

Dimitrios Gioukoudis (Greek: Δημήτριος Γιουκούδης; born 27 August 1997) is a Greek professional footballer who plays as a forward for Super League 2 club Veria.
