= Georgios Bletsas =

Greek footballer (born 1995)

Personal information
- Full name: Georgios Bletsas
- Date of birth: 2 May 1995 (age 31)
- Place of birth: Ioannina, Greece
- Height: 1.84 m (6 ft 0 in)
- Position: Defensive midfielder

Team information
- Current team: Veria
- Number: 7

Youth career
- PAS Giannina

Senior career*
Years	Team	Apps	(Gls)
2013–2014	Kalamata		
2014–2015	Zakynthos	18	(3)
2015–2016	Panionios	1	(0)
2016–2017	Iraklis	0	(0)
2017–2018	Veria	12	(1)
2018–	Veria	76	(3)
- * Club domestic league appearances and goals as of 16 June 2023

Georgios Bletsas (Greek: Γεώργιος Μπλέτσας; born 2 May 1995) is a Greek professional footballer who plays as a defensive midfielder for Gamma Ethniki club Pierikos.

== Honours ==
Veria

Gamma Ethniki: 2018–19
