= Vasilios Fasidis =

Greek professional footballer

Personal information
- Full name: Vasilios Fasidis
- Date of birth: 22 June 1996 (age 30)
- Place of birth: Veria, Greece
- Height: 1.77 m (5 ft 10 in)
- Position: Winger

Team information
- Current team: Veria
- Number: 9

Youth career
- –2012: Pontioi Veria
- 2012–2015: Xanthi

Senior career*
Years	Team	Apps	(Gls)
2015–2019	Xanthi	16	(1)
2016–2017	→ Aiginiakos (loan)	25	(3)
2019–2022	PAOK	0	(0)
2019–2021	→ Xanthi (loan)	19	(1)
2021	→ Trikala (loan)	5	(0)
2021–2022	PAOK B	16	(2)
2022–2023	Veria	11	(3)
2023	Pierikos	10	(0)
2024–	Veria	13	(2)

International career^{‡}
2013	Greece U17	1	(0)
2014	Greece U18	3	(0)
2014	Greece U19	5	(0)
2018	Greece U21	3	(0)
- * Club domestic league appearances and goals as of 13 April 2024 ‡ National team caps and goals as of 21 January 2019

Vasilios Fasidis (Greek: Βασίλειος Φασίδης; born 22 June 1996) is a Greek professional footballer who plays as a winger for Gamma Ethniki club Veria.
