= Konstantinos Georgiadis =

Greek coach and retired association football player (born 1980)

Personal information
- Date of birth: 17 January 1980 (age 46)
- Place of birth: Thessaloniki, Greece
- Height: 1.83 m (6 ft 0 in)
- Position: Midfielder

Team information
- Current team: Panserraikos (manager)

Senior career*
Years	Team	Apps	(Gls)
–2002	Foinikas Polichni		
2002–2004	ILTEX Lykoi	65	(10)
2004–2006	Veria	54	(4)
2006–2008	Agrotikos Asteras	26	(0)
2008–2010	Makedonikos	55	(1)
2010–2012	Anagennisi Epanomi	46	(4)
2012–2013	Ethnikos Gazoros	34	(0)
2013–2015	Agrotikos Asteras	45	(0)

Managerial career
- 2015–2016: Agrotikos Asteras (sporting director)
- 2016: Agrotikos Asteras
- 2016–2018: Apollon Kalamaria (assistant)
- 2018–2019: Triglia
- 2019–2020: Veria
- 2020–2021: Triglia
- 2021–2022: Iraklis
- 2023–2024: Panionios
- 2024–2025: Kampaniakos
- 2025: Volos
- 2025–2026: Niki Volos
- 2026: Panthrakikos
- 2026–: Panserraikos
- * Club domestic league appearances and goals

Konstantinos Georgiadis (Greek: Κωνσταντίνος Γεωργιάδης; born 17 January 1980) is a Greek professional football manager and former player.

== Managerial career ==
In February 2025, Georgiadis was announced as the new coach of Volos.

== Managerial statistics ==
As of match played 22 March 2026

Managerial record by team and tenure
Team	From	To	Record				
Team	From	To	G	W	D	L	Win %
Agrotikos Asteras	8 February 2016	18 July 2016	15	6	4	5	40.00
Triglia	25 July 2018	25 November 2019	38	21	6	11	55.26
Veria	26 November 2019	30 June 2020	15	5	4	6	33.33
Triglia	22 August 2020	30 June 2021	18	4	9	5	22.22
Iraklis	5 August 2021	5 December 2022	39	13	16	10	33.33
Panionios	3 July 2023	30 June 2024	34	26	6	2	76.47
Kampaniakos	3 July 2024	25 February 2025	22	10	5	7	45.45
Volos	25 February 2025	11 June 2025	12	5	3	4	41.67
Niki Volos	2 July 2025	26 March 2026	25	13	9	3	52.00
Panthrakikos	12 June 2025	22 September 2026	4	2	1	1	50.00
Panserraikos	22 September 2026	present					
Total			222	105	63	54	47.30
