= Vangelis Chosadas =

Greek footballer (born 1961)

Personal information
- Full name: Evangelos Chosadas
- Date of birth: 17 February 1961 (age 65)
- Place of birth: Amfissa, Greece
- Height: 1.87 m (6 ft 2 in)
- Position: Goalkeeper

Team information
- Current team: Diagoras (manager)

Senior career*
Years	Team	Apps	(Gls)
–1981	Fokikos		
1981–1983	Panathinaikos		
1981–1982	→ Ilisiakos (loan)		
1983–1995	OFI	151	(0)
1995–1997	Skoda Xanthi	44	(0)
1997–1999	Ethnikos Asteras	28	(0)
1999–2001	OFI	8	(0)

Managerial career
- 2005–2006: Rodos
- 2019–2021: Ialysos (assistant)
- 2020: → Ialysos (caretaker)
- 2021–2022: Chania (assistant)
- 2022–2024: Diagoras (assistant)
- 2023: → Diagoras (caretaker)
- 2024: Diagoras (assistant)
- 2025–: Diagoras
- * Club domestic league appearances and goals

Vangelis Chosadas (Greek: Βαγγέλης Χοσάδας; born 17 February 1961) is a retired Greek football goalkeeper and later manager.
