= Apostolos Charalampidis =

Greek footballer

Personal information
- Date of birth: 4 July 1968 (age 58)
- Place of birth: Kastoria, Greece

Team information
- Current team: Anagennisi Karditsa (manager)

Managerial career
- Years: Team
- 2010: Veria
- 2011: Kallithea
- 2011: Doxa Drama
- 2013: Niki Volos
- 2013: Nea Salamina
- 2013: Kavala
- 2014–2015: Tyrnavos
- 2015: Olympiacos Volos
- 2016–2017: Asteras Tripolis (youth)
- 2017: Asteras Tripolis (caretaker)
- 2017–2018: Veria
- 2018: Panserraikos
- 2018: Aiginiakos
- 2018: Aittitos Spata
- 2019–2020: Karaiskakis
- 2020: Ionikos
- 2020–2021: Trikala
- 2021–2022: Egaleo
- 2023: Proodeftiki
- 2023: Aiolikos
- 2024–2025: Egaleo
- 2025: Ilioupoli
- 2025–2026: Kampaniakos
- 2026–: Anagennisi Karditsa

Apostolos Charalampidis (Greek: Απόστολος Χαραλαμπίδης; born 4 July 1968) is a Greek professional football manager.
