= Georgios Marinos =

Greek footballer

Personal information
- Date of birth: 8 May 2000 (age 26)
- Place of birth: Mytilene, Greece
- Height: 1.72 m (5 ft 8 in)
- Position: Winger

Team information
- Current team: Panserraikos
- Number: 11

Youth career
- –2018: Asteras Tripolis
- 2018–2020: Olympiacos

Senior career*
Years	Team	Apps	(Gls)
2020–2024	Olympiacos	0	(0)
2020–2021	→ Levadiakos (loan)	24	(3)
2021–2024	Olympiacos B	71	(12)
2024–2025	Panserraikos	2	(0)
2026–	Panserraikos	0	(0)
- * Club domestic league appearances and goals as of 18 June 2025

Georgios Marinos (Greek: Γεώργιος Μαρίνος; born 8 May 2000) is a Greek professional footballer who plays as a winger for Super League 2 club Panserraikos.
