= Nikolaos Baxevanos =

Greek footballer (born 1999)

Nikos Baxevanos
Personal information
- Full name: Nikolaos Baxevanos
- Date of birth: 16 July 1999 (age 27)
- Place of birth: Thessaloniki, Greece
- Height: 1.87 m (6 ft 2 in)
- Position: Centre-back

Team information
- Current team: Metalul Buzău
- Number: 26

Youth career
- 2005–2012: Achilleas Pereas
- 2012–2016: Aris
- 2016–2019: Lazio

Senior career*
Years	Team	Apps	(Gls)
2019–2021	Lazio	0	(0)
2019–2020	→ Panionios (loan)	0	(0)
2020	→ Botoșani (loan)	1	(0)
2020–2021	→ Politehnica Iași (loan)	35	(0)
2021–2022	Chindia Târgoviște	7	(0)
2022–2023	Spartak Subotica	6	(0)
2023–2024	Kalamata	20	(0)
2024–2025	Panachaiki	28	(0)
2025	AEK Athens B	5	(0)
2025–2026	Niki Volos	11	(0)
2026–	Metalul Buzău	8	(0)

International career
2017	Greece U19	6	(0)
- * Club domestic league appearances and goals as of 31 October 2026

Nikolaos "Nikos" Baxevanos (Greek: Νικόλαος "Νίκος" Μπαξεβάνος; born 16 July 1999) is a Greek professional footballer who plays as a centre-back for Liga II club Metalul Buzău.

== Personal life ==
He is the son of Spyros Baxevanos.
