= Veria Stadium =

Building in Veroia, Central Macedonia, Greece

Veria Stadium (Στάδιο Βέροιας)
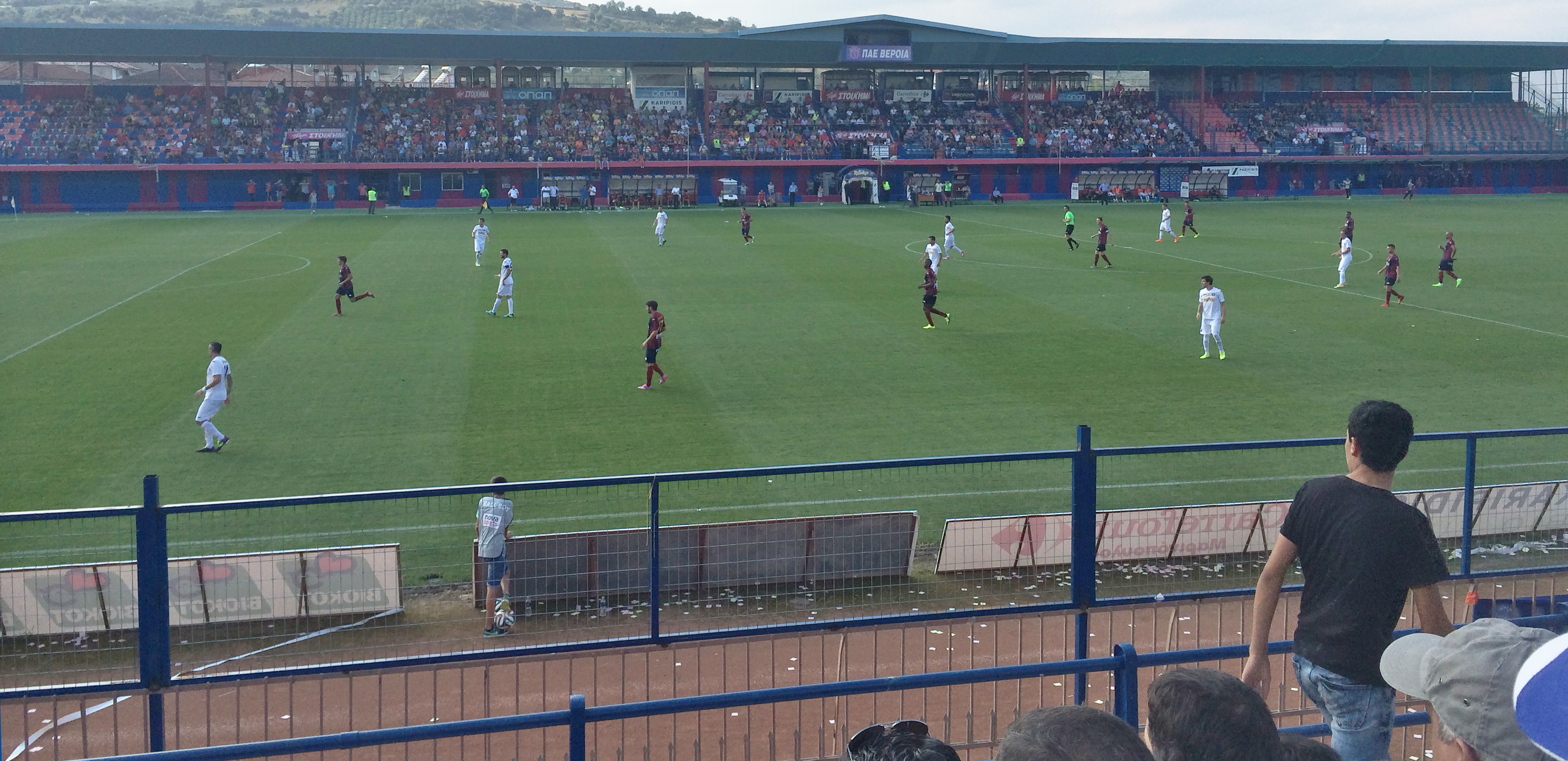
- Interactive map of Veria Stadium (Στάδιο Βέροιας)
- Full name: Municipal Stadium of Veria
- Location: Veria, Greece
- Coordinates: 40°32′2.80″N 22°12′8.50″E
- Owner: Municipality of Veria
- Capacity: 7,000
- Surface: Grass
- Scoreboard: Yes
- Field size: 104 x 70m

Construction
- Opened: 1925 (renovated in 1997, 2005, 2007 and 2013)

Tenants
- GMS Megas Alexandros (1925–1950); Veria FC (1960–2018); Veria 1960 FC (2019–present); Pontioi Veria FC (1984–1995); Greece Women's (2014–present); 2015 UEFA Euro U–19

Veria Stadium (Greek: Στάδιο Βέροιας) is a multi-purpose stadium in Veria, Greece. It is used for football matches, and is the home stadium of Veria 1960 FC. It was built in 1925 by members of music and gymnastics association Megas Alexandros. The stadium holds about 7,000. It is situated 1.5 kilometres (0.93 mi) off the city centre. Record attendance is 10,309 for a game between Veria and Panathinaikos in 1970. However, during a game between Veria and PAOK FC there were about 12,000 fans, but most of them entered the stadium without a ticket. The stadium formerly held track races too but after the renovations in 2005 and 2007 the space for track runners was removed.

== Renovation ==
During 1997, Veria F.C. in co-operation with Municipality of Veria installed a roof at the west stand while, in 1998 an electronic scoreboard was installed. Again, in 2005 a lighting system was installed while the stadium capacity was greatly reduced due to the installation of seats to approximately 5,300. Although, in 2007 administration board of Veria & the city's mayor agreed to the construction of a north and a south stand which increased the stadium capacity to 7,000. During the team's comeback to the Super League in 2012 Veria applied some improvements to the stadium in order to be qualified to host the championship matches.

In 2013, Veria F.C. announced another renovation in the stadium. Since the beginning of the season due to security reasons the stands were upgraded as security rails were installed. Also due to damaged drainage system and an almost destroyed football field, on September 16, 2013, Veria announced the replacement of current drainage system and the reinstallation of a new football field. The replacement was expected to be complete by October 20, 2013. Veria F.C. was expected to use its stadium again in the local derby against Aris in October 20. Also there are plans of another expansion in the near future while soon the electronic ticket will be available in Veria Stadium as well. On October 18, 2013 Veria announced that the renovation of stadium was over and the stadium was ready to host again Veria's fixtures in Super League Greece. Except the pitch's replacement the stadium was painted in blue-crimson colours while new goalposts were installed. Last but not least the locker rooms and the stadium's entrance were improved too. So that the stadium is able to host International matches.

== Venues ==
In summer of 2015 Veria and her stadium will host in Greece along with Katerini and Larissa the 2015 UEFA European Under-19 Championship. Also every year, during the summer season there are plenty of music concerts taking place. On 17 September 2014 Veria Stadium held its first ever international match between Greece and Albania as part of 2015 FIFA Women's World Cup European qualification round. During November 2014, an international friendly tournament was held at Veria Stadium.

== Most receipts ==
#	Match	Tickets	Score	Date
1	Veria vs Panathinaikos	10.309	0–0	20 September 1970
2	Veria vs Doxa Drama	10.135	2–1	12 April 1970
3	Veria vs Doxa Drama	9.500	0–0	23 January 1977
4	Veria vs PAOK	9.500	1–3	9 April 1978
5	Veria vs Olympiacos	9.028	2–1	30 January 1972
6	Veria vs PAOK	8.506	1–0	1 November 1970
7	Veria vs Olympiacos	8.234	0–0	22 December 1968
8	Veria vs Olympiacos	8.226	2–1	22 April 1968
9	Veria vs PAOK	8.149	1–0	30 April 1972
10	Veria vs Aris	8.145	2–1	26 January 1969

== International matches ==
#	Match	Score	Date	Attendance
1	Greece vs Albania	4–0	17 September 2014	N/A
2	Greece vs France	0–0	13 November 2014	N/A
3	France vs Spain	1–5	15 November 2014	N/A
4	Germany vs France	4–2	17 November 2014	N/A
5	Greece vs Ukraine	2–0	6 July 2015	3,430
6	Spain vs Russia	1–3	10 July 2015	1,322
7	Ukraine vs Austria	2–2	12 July 2015	992
8	Spain vs Netherlands	1–1	13 July 2015	1,811

== Concerts ==
Concerts at Veria Municipal Stadium
Date	Artist	Tour	Attendance
23 September 2023	Konstantinos Argyros	Elpida Tour	8.000

== Gallery ==
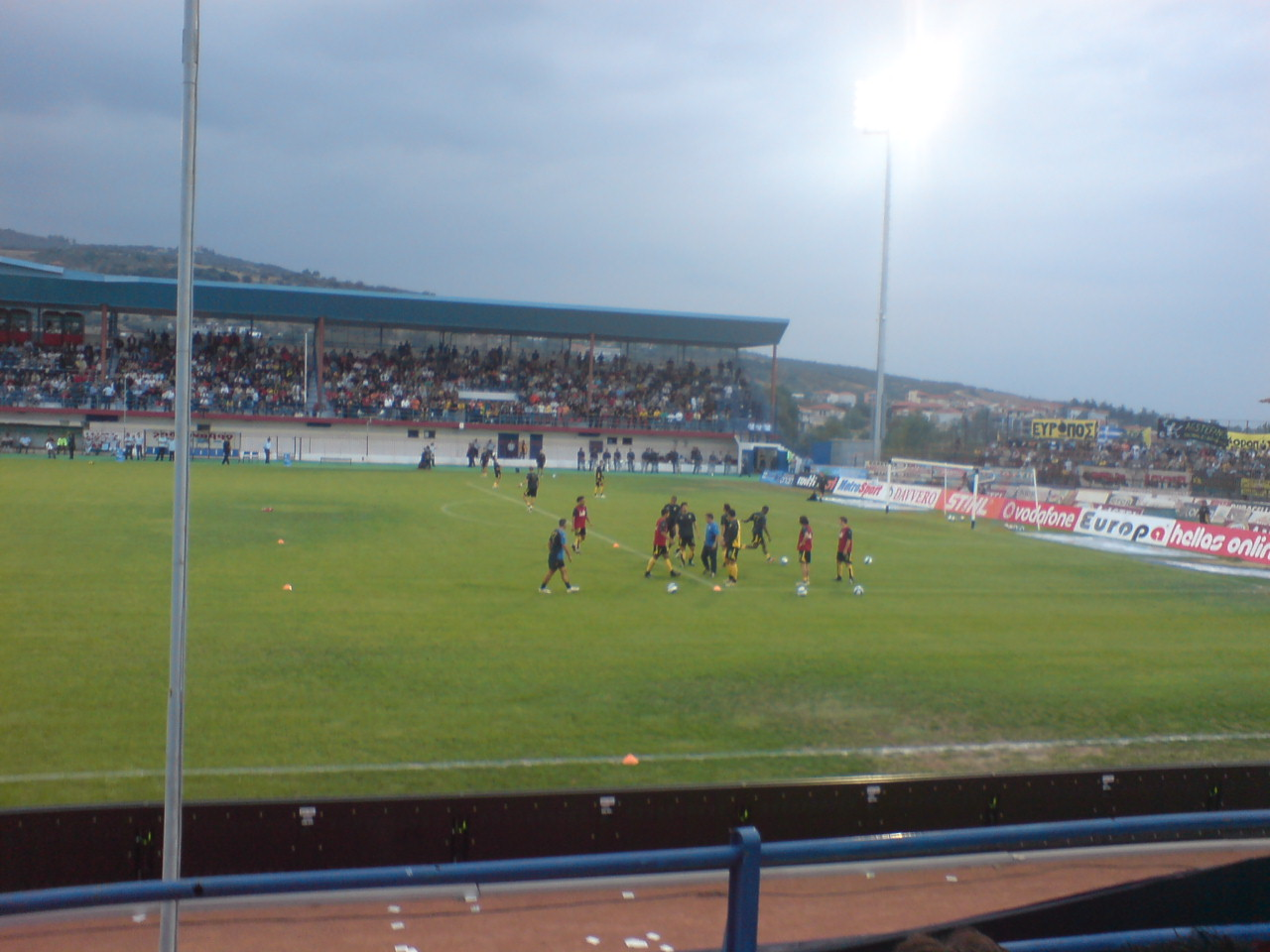
Game between Veria and AEK Athens in September 2007.

Veria against Asteras Tripolis.

Veria vs Skoda Xanthi.

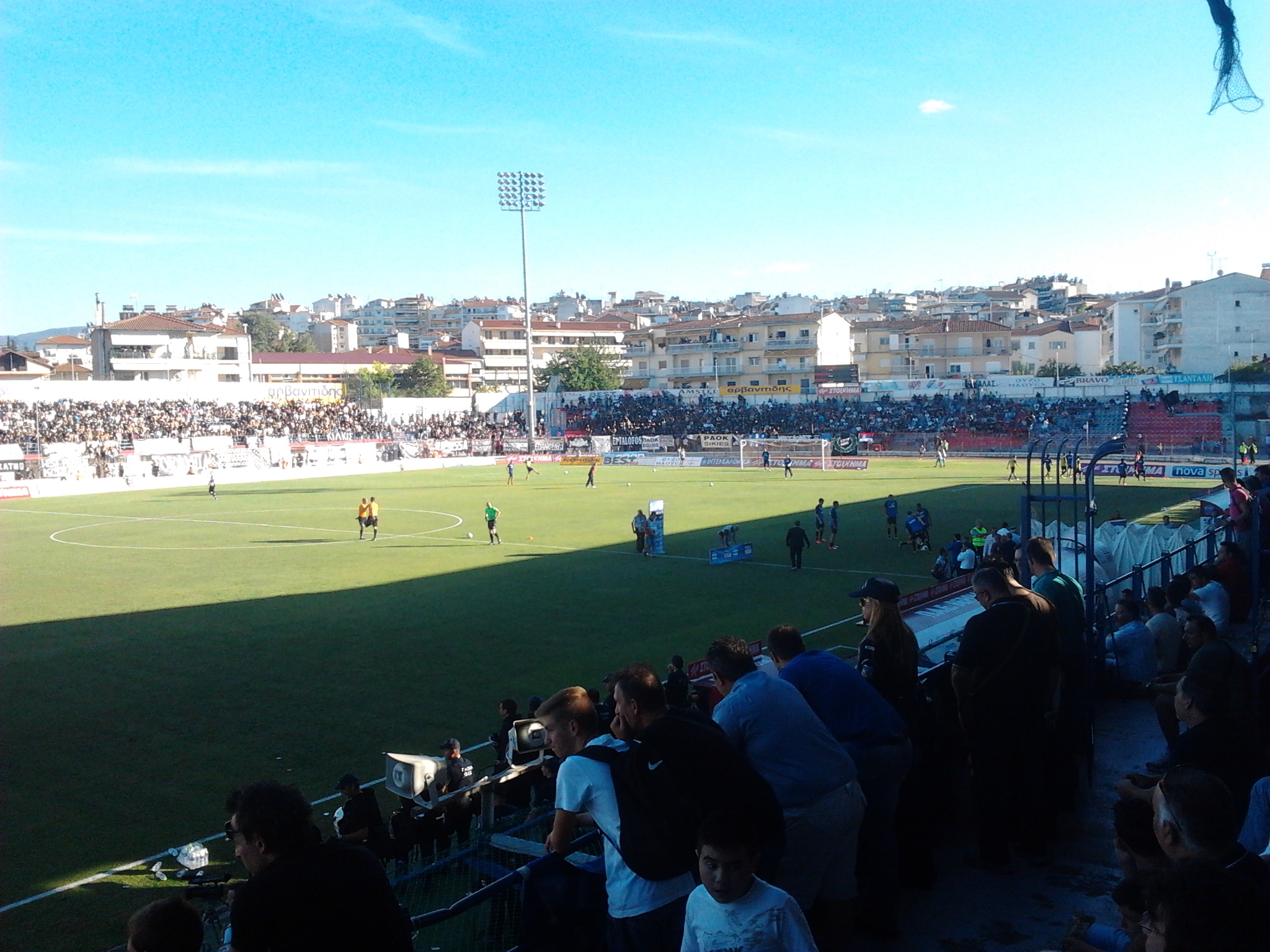
Veria F.C. vs PAOK in season 2013–14.

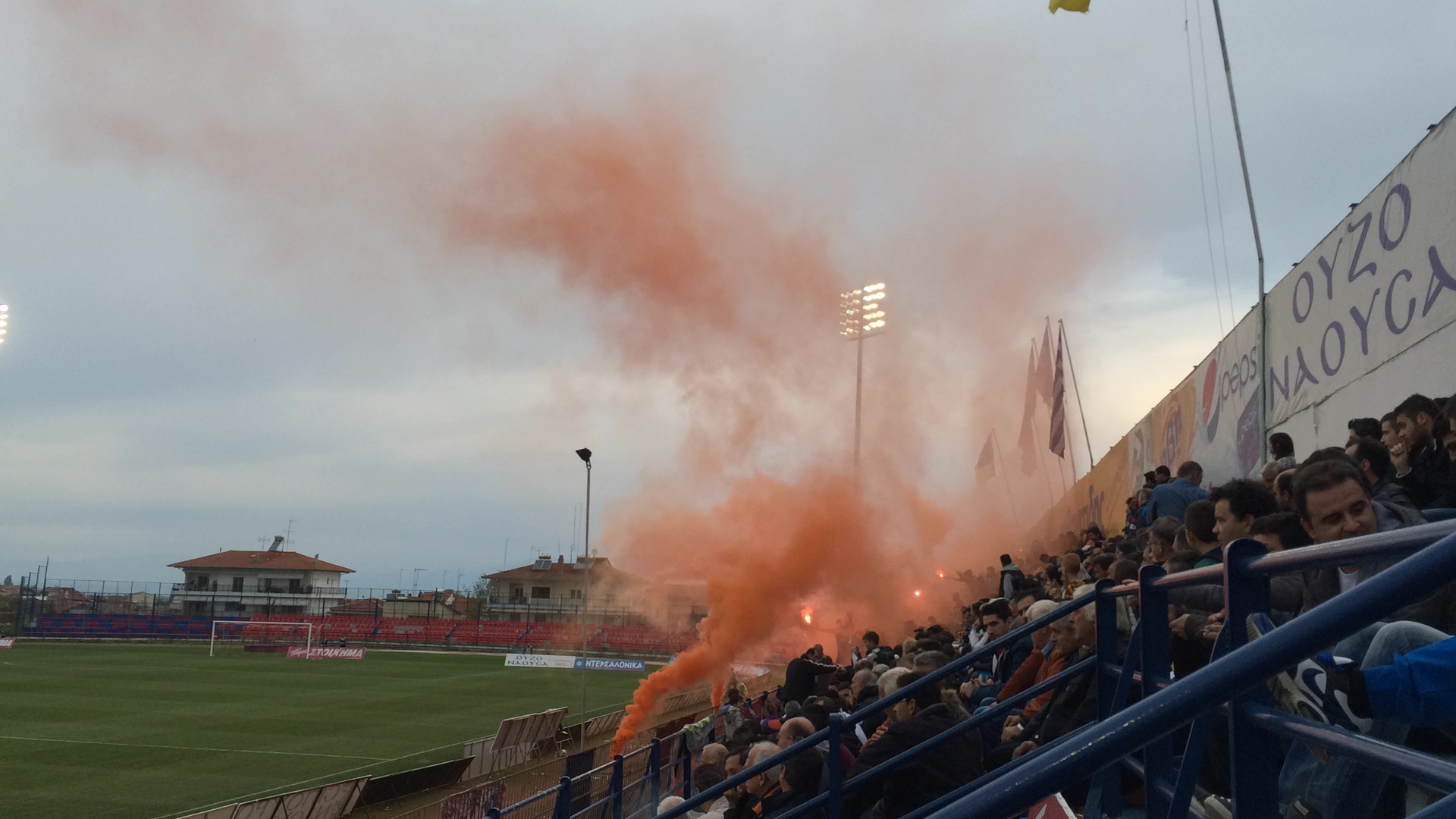
Veria] against Asteras Tripolis from the east stand of the stadium.

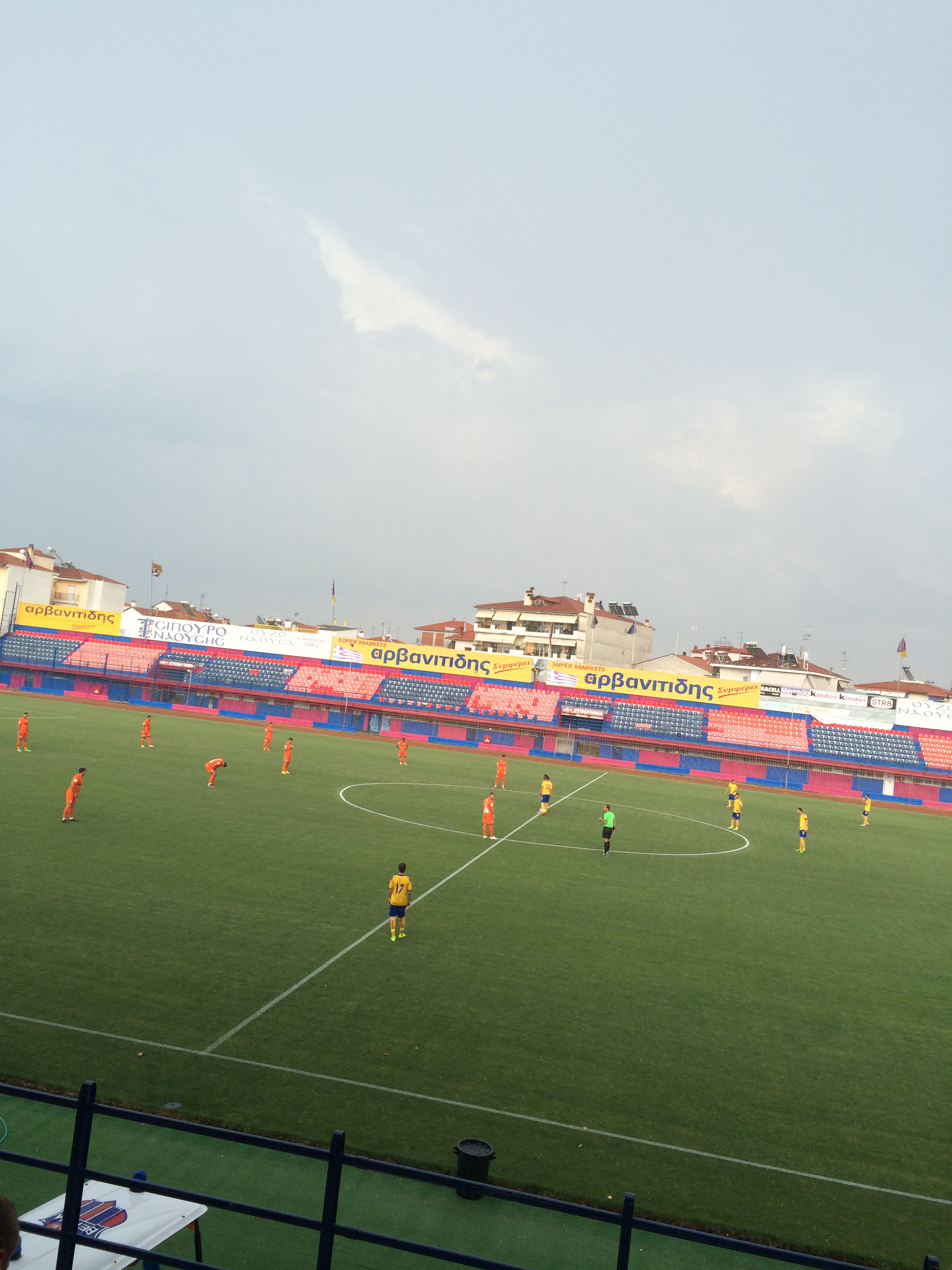
View from the west stand of the east stand at Veria Stadium

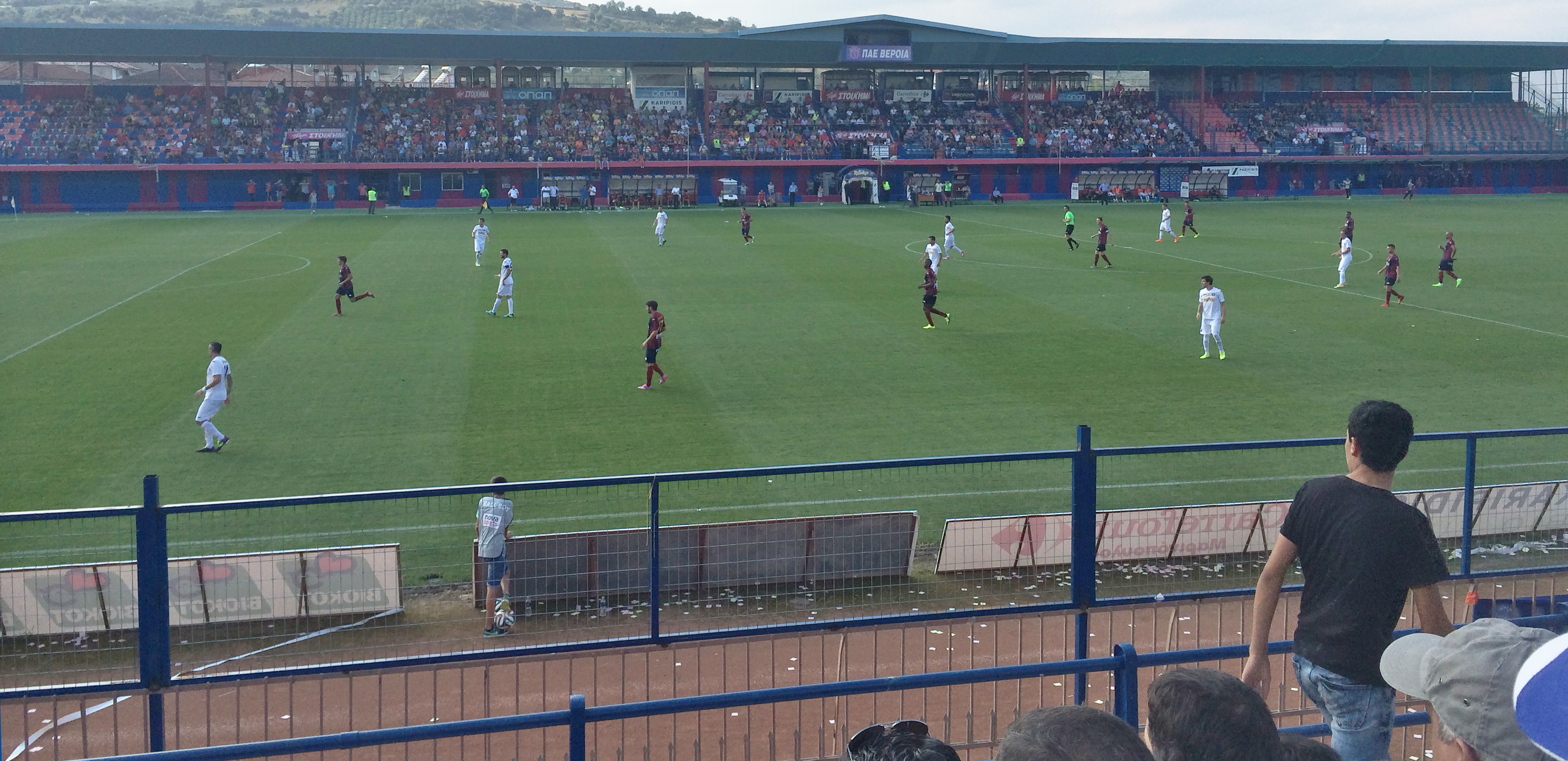
West stand of Veria Stadium.

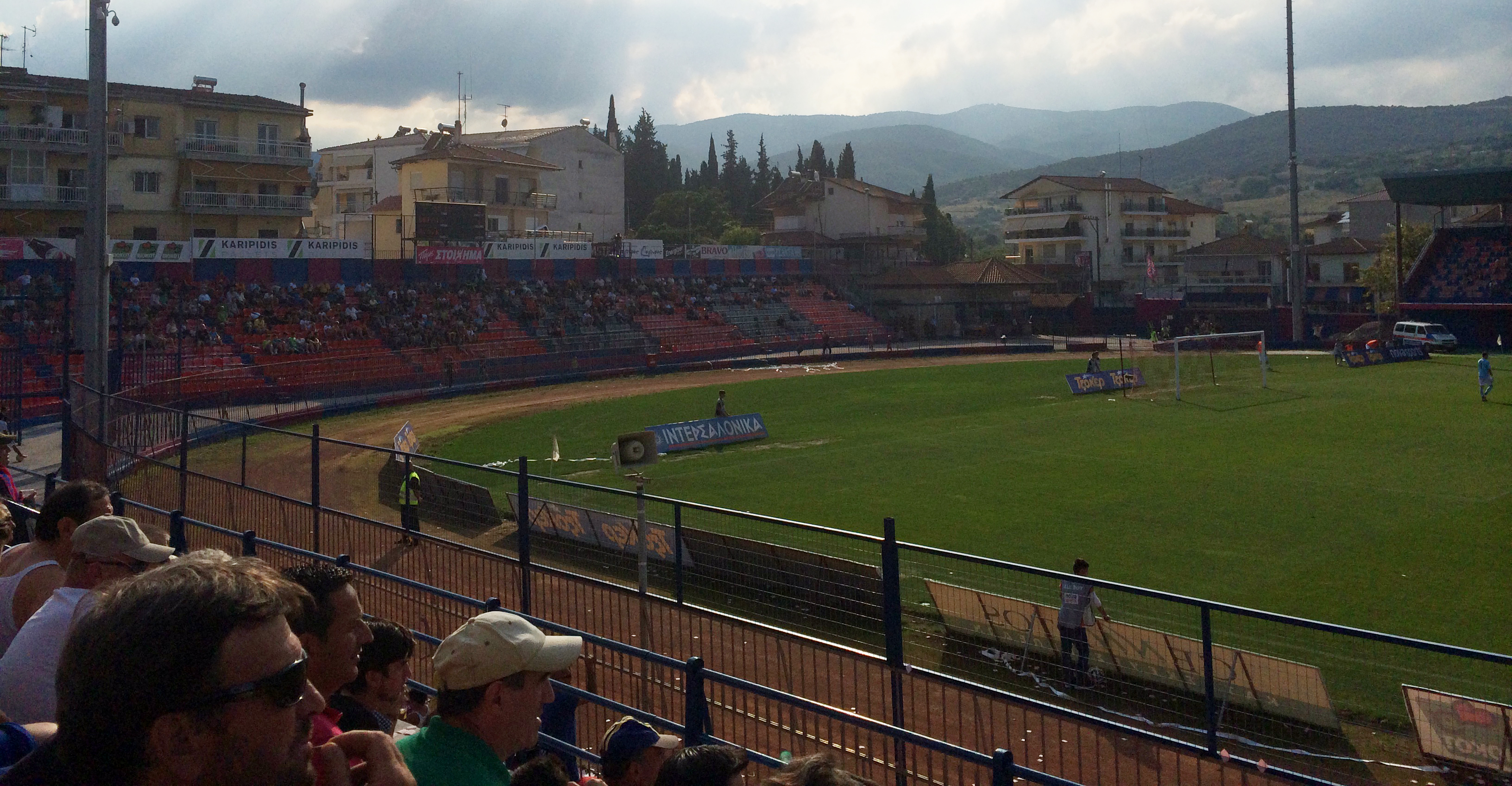
South Stand of Veria Stadium.

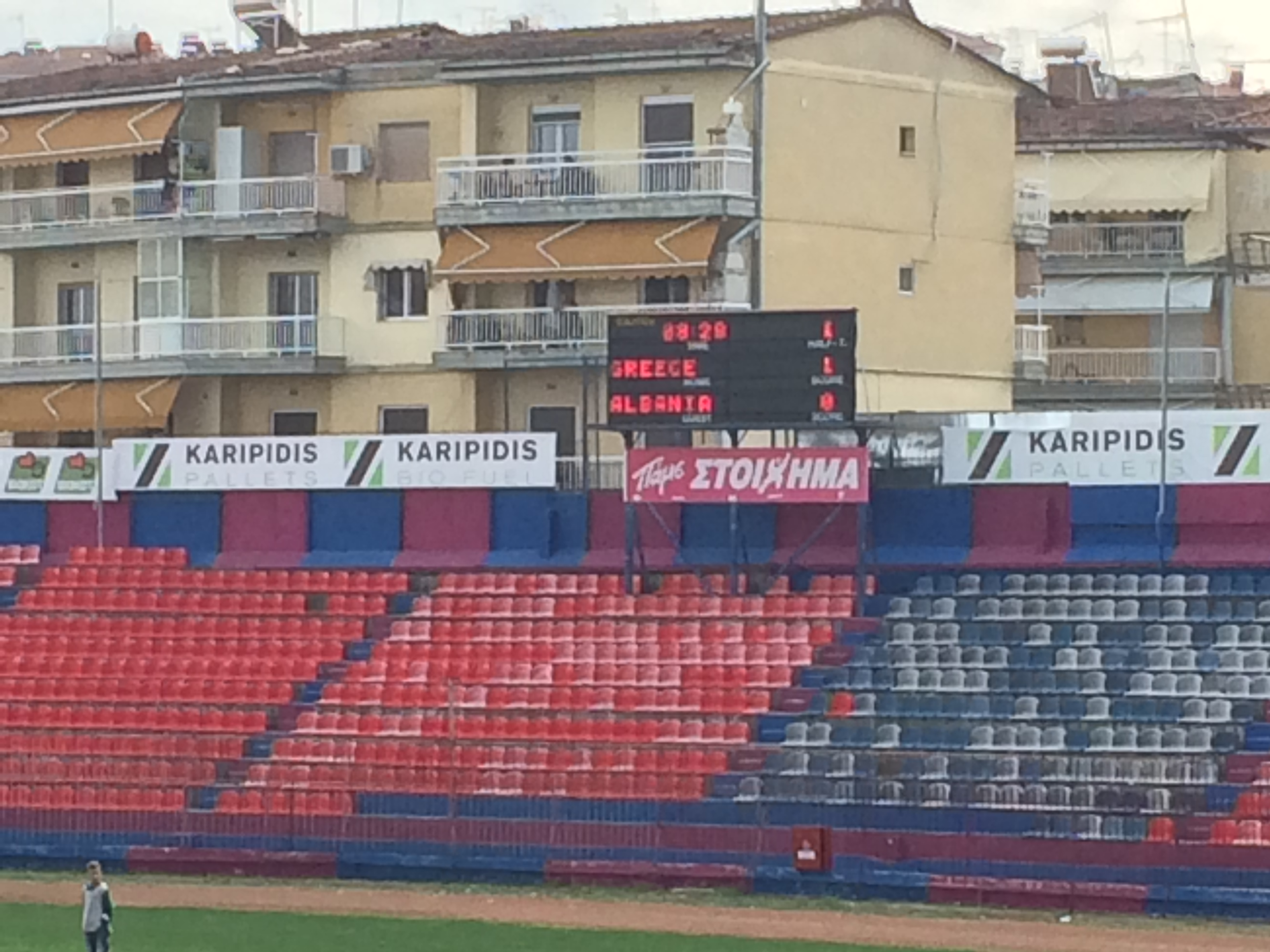
Scoreboard of Veria stadium.

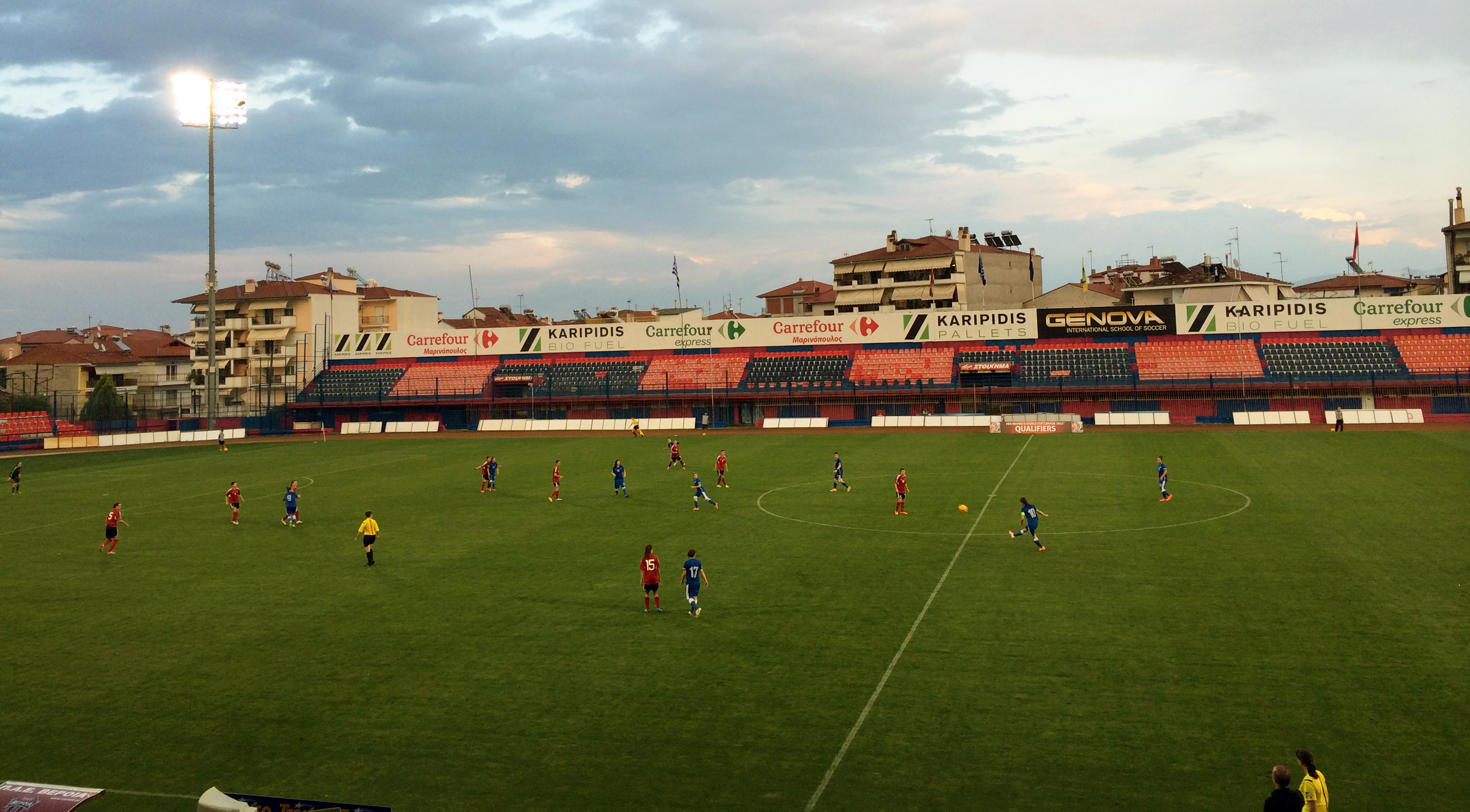
Greece vs Albania in Veria Stadium

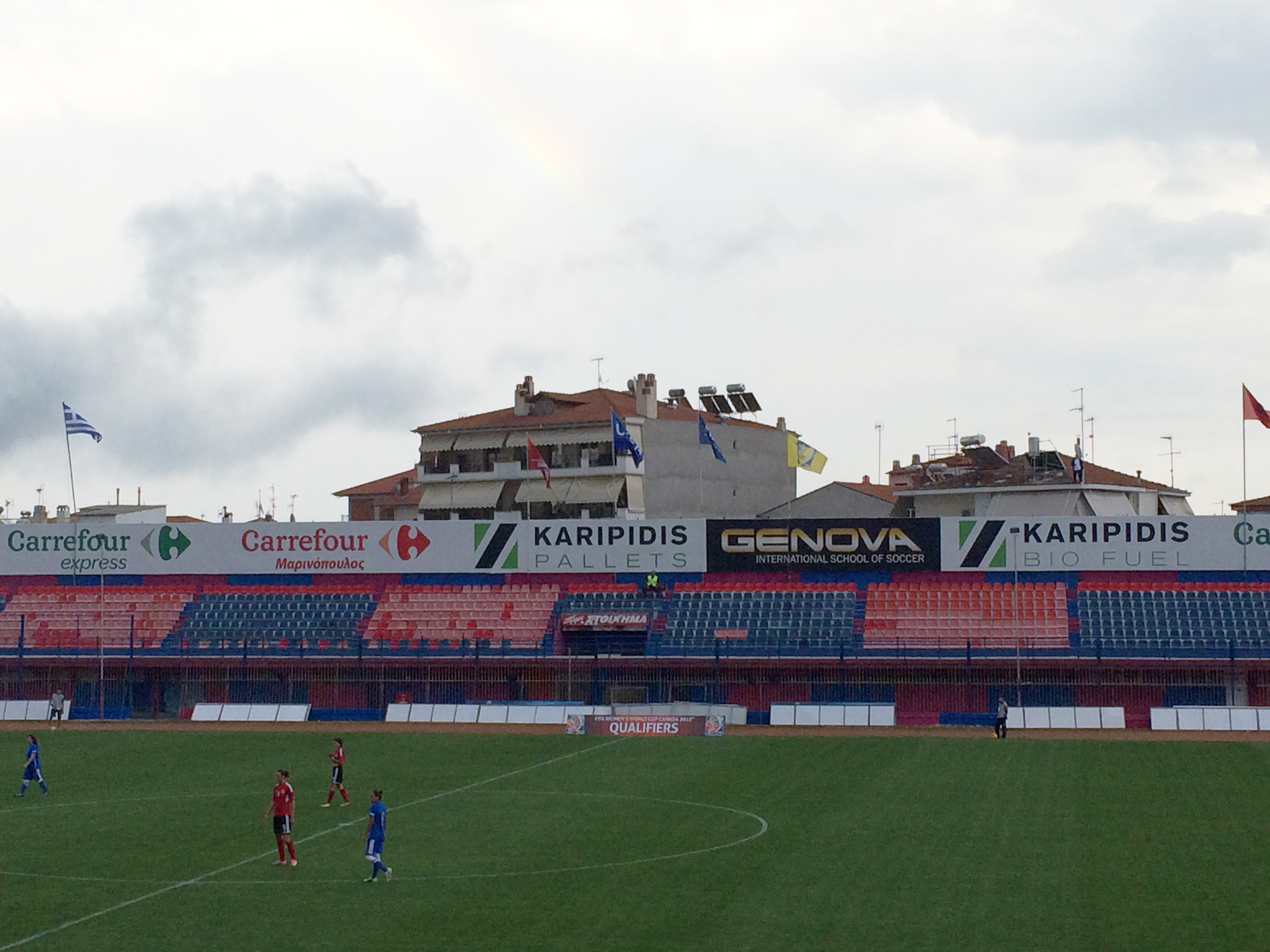
Veria stadium during the international match of Greece women's national team against Albania as part of World Cup's 2015 European qualification round.

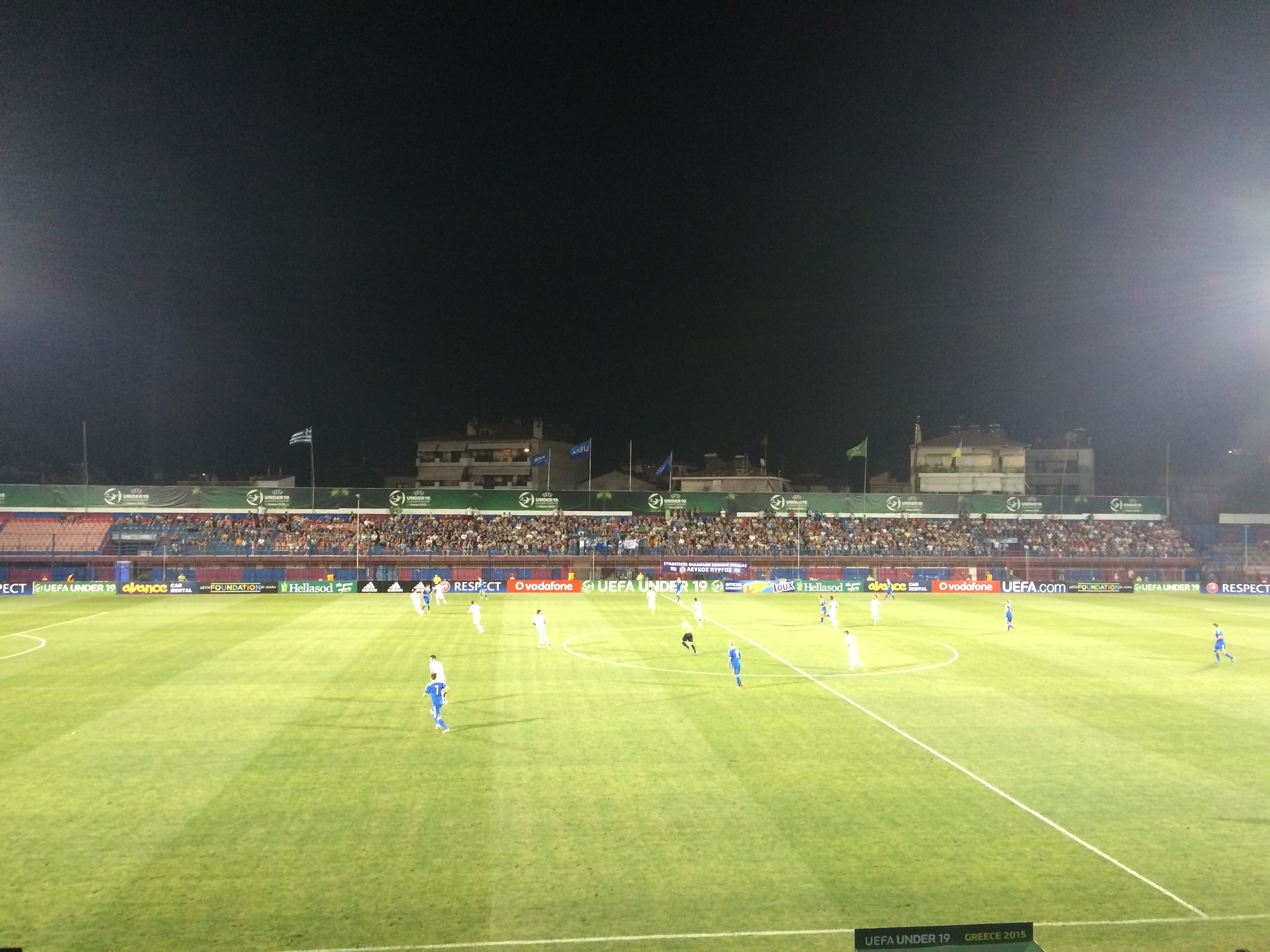
Premiere day: Greece vs Ukraine in 2015 European U19 championship at Veria Stadium.

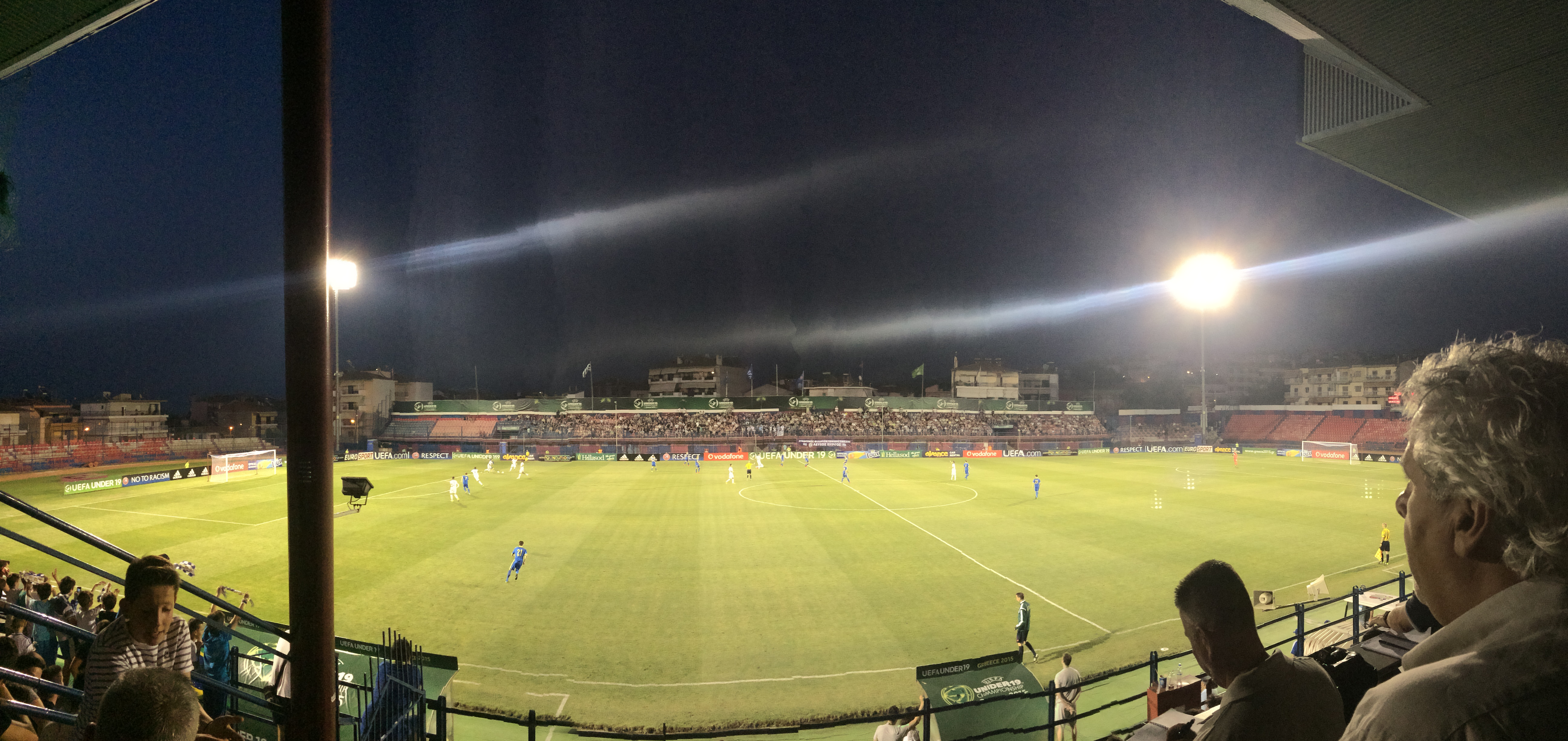
Panorama of the north, south and east stand of Veria Stadium during the premiere game between Greece vs Ukraine in 2015 European U19 championship.
