= Konstantinos Anyfantakis =

Greek football manager

Personal information
- Full name: Konstantinos Anyfantakis
- Date of birth: 29 October 1971 (age 55)
- Place of birth: Rethymno, Greece

Team information
- Current team: Xanthi (manager)

Managerial career
- Years: Team
- 2013–2015: Episkopi
- 2015: Kavala
- 2016: Panthrakikos
- 2017–2018: Kavala
- 2018: Ionikos
- 2018–2019: AEEK SYNKA
- 2019–2020: Doxa Drama
- 2020–2021: Kavala
- 2022: Xanthi
- 2022: Veria
- 2022–2023: Episkopi
- 2024: Giouchtas
- 2024: Kavala
- 2025–2026: Giouchtas
- 2026–: Xanthi

Konstantinos Anyfantakis (Greek: Κωνσταντίνος Ανυφαντάκης; born 29 October 1971) is a Greek professional football manager.
