= Makedonikos Stadium =

Football stadium in Efkarpia, Thessaloniki, Greece

Coordinates: 40°40′40″N 22°57′01″E

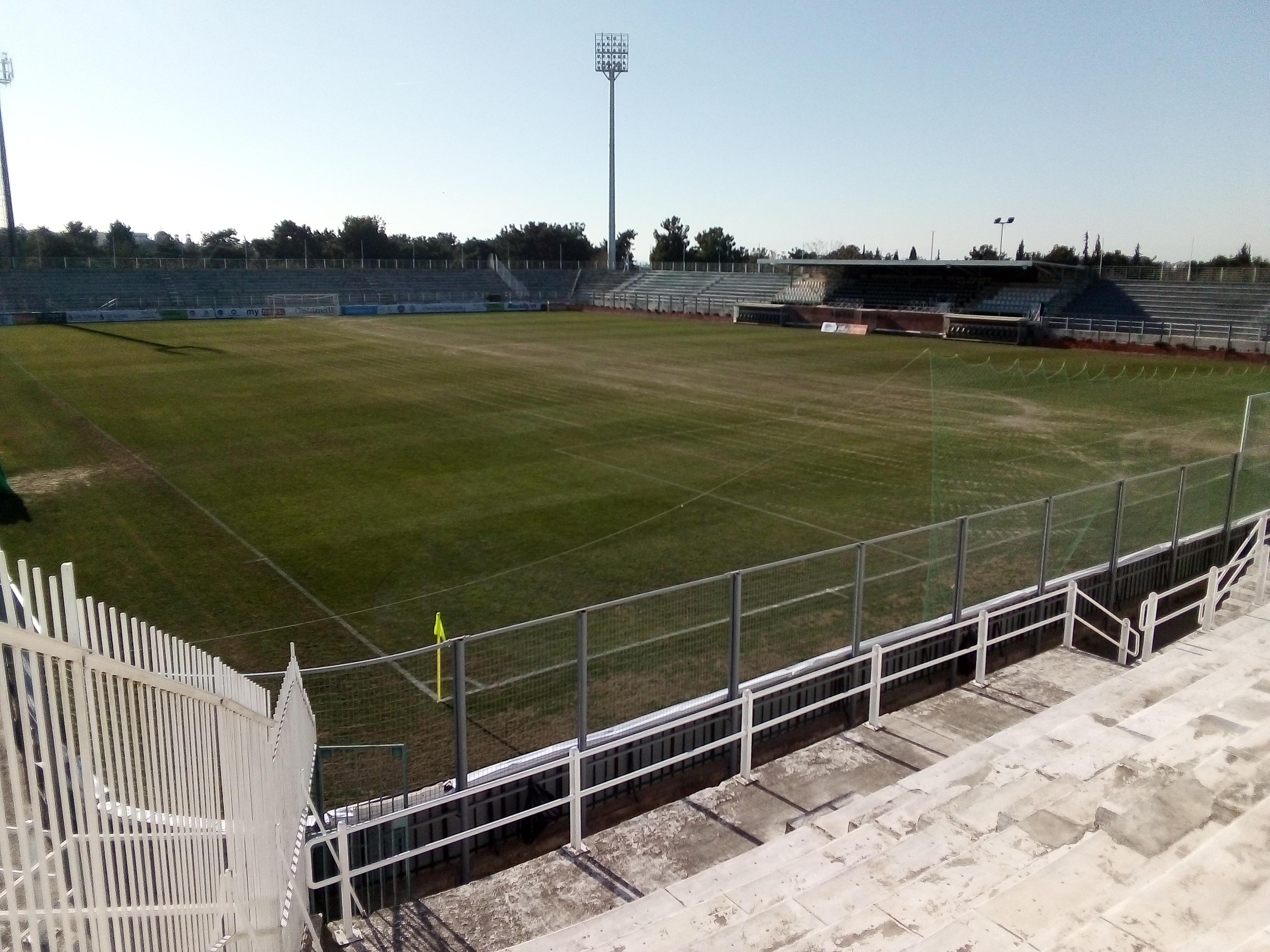
- Interactive map of Makedonikos Stadium
- Full name: Gipedo Makedonikou
- Location: Efkarpia, Thessaloniki, Greece
- Owner: A.S. Makedonikos
- Capacity: 7,500

Construction
- Built: 1967
- Renovated: 2002

Tenants
- Makedonikos FC, PAOK B

Makedonikos Stadium (greek: Γήπεδο Μακεδονικού / Gipedo Makedonikou) is a football stadium located in Efkarpia, Thessaloniki, Greece. It is home to Makedonikos football club.

The stadium was also used by Iraklis for two seasons when Kaftanzoglio Stadium was under renovation for Athens 2004 Olympics. For that reason, during 2002, it was upgraded to meet Greece 1st division standards.

On 5 June 1983, its record attendance was set with 9,422 attendants for the match Makedonikos FC vs Olympiacos.

It has also been used for live concerts by Ska-P, Scorpions and others.
