= Spyros Baxevanos =

Greek footballer (born in 1971)

Personal information
- Full name: Spyridon Baxevanos
- Date of birth: 17 January 1971 (age 55)
- Place of birth: Giannitsa, Greece
- Height: 1.74 m (5 ft 9 in)
- Position: Midfielder

Team information
- Current team: Neos Kissamikos (manager)

Senior career*
| Years | Team | Apps | (Gls) |
| 1989–1990 | Poseidon Nea Michaniona | | |
| 1990–1991 | Neapoli | | |
| 1991–1997 | Apollon Kalamarias | | |
| 1997–1999 | ILTEX Lykoi | | |
| 1999–2003 | Apollon Kalamarias | | |
| 2003–2004 | Poseidon Neon Poron | | |
| 2004–2005 | Olympiacos Volos | | |
| 2005–2008 | Thermaikos | | |
| 2008–2009 | Makedonikos | | |

Managerial career
- 2009: Makedonikos (caretaker)
- 2010: Makedonikos
- 2010: Thermaikos
- 2010–2011: Zakynthos
- 2011–2012: Anagennisi Giannitsa
- 2012: Apollon Kalamarias
- 2012: Anagennisi Epanomi
- 2013–2017: PGS Kissamikos
- 2017: Panegialios
- 2018: Iraklis
- 2018–2019: Ayia Napa
- 2019: Panachaiki
- 2020–2021: Iraklis
- 2022: Chania
- 2023: Veria
- 2023–: Rodos
- 2026–: Neos Kissamikos
- * Club domestic league appearances and goals

Spyros Baxevanos (Greek: Σπύρος Μπαξεβάνος; born 17 January 1971) is a Greek professional football manager and former player. He is the father of Nikos Baxevanos. (Note: Spyros Baxevanos at WorldFootball.net)
