= P.A.E. G.S. Diagoras =

Diagoras
- Full name: Gymnastic Club Diagoras 1905; Greek: Γυμναστικός Σύλλογος Διαγόρας 1905
- Nicknames: Γηραιός (Elder Man); Kυανέρυθροι (The cyan and red)
- Founded: March 25, 1905; 121 years ago
- Ground: Diagoras Stadium
- Capacity: 3,693
- Chairman: Nikolaos Savvaidis
- Manager: Vangelis Chosadas
- League: Gamma Ethniki
- 2025–26: Gamma Ethniki (Group 5), 4th
Home colours	Away colours	Third colours

G.S. Diagoras 1905 (Greek: Γ.Σ. Διαγόρας 1905) is a Greek football club based in Rhodes city founded in 1905.

Diagoras is named after the island's ancient boxer Diagoras.

The team first played under Ottoman rule until the short lived independence of the Dodecanese islands in 1912 and then under the Italian occupation of the island. No matches at all were held during the Balkan Wars and the team played only with other local teams until Rhodes and Dodecanese unified with the rest of Greece in 1947.

== History ==
Due to the club's extensive social, cultural, athletic, and particularly patriotic activities, the Fascist Italian authorities in occupation decided to dissolve it in 1929. Diagoras reconstituted in 1945, just prior to the liberation of Rhodes and the union with the rest of Hellas. First joined the Beta Ethniki (2nd national division) in its creation in 1962-'63. They played in Alpha Ethniki (1st national division) between 1986-1989.

In 1987, the club reached the semi-finals of the Greek Cup, losing to OFI.

Diagoras returned to Beta Ethinki in 2008 until 2012 and since 2020 continues to the 5th season in Super League 2. Since September of 2025 the club participates in Gamma Ethniki (third tier).

In the 2019–2020 season, Diagoras finished in third place of the Football League (3rd tier) and was promoted to the Super League 2 (A2 division), the second tier of the professional football in Hellas.

== League participation ==
- First Division (3): 1986–1989
- Second Division (22): 1962–1968, 1974–1975, 1980–1986, 1989–1992, 2008–2012, 2020–2025
- Third Division (11): 1978–1980, 1992–1993, 2005–2008, 2017–2020, 2025–present
- Fourth Division (5): 1993–1994, 2002–2005, 2012–2013
- Local Championships (15): 1970–1974, 1975–1978, 1998–2002, 2013–2017

== Honours ==
P.A.E. G.S. Diagoras honours
Type	Competition	Titles	Winners	Runners-up
Domestic	Beta Ethniki (Second-tier)	1	1985–86	1963–64, 1965–66, 1966–67, 1982–83
Domestic	Gamma Ethniki (Third-tier)	3	1974, 1979–80, 2007–08	2018–19
Domestic	Delta Ethniki (Fourth-tier)	1	2004–05	
Regional	Dodecanese FCA Championship	17	1947–48, 1948–49, 1949–50, 1950–51, 1951–52, 1952–53, 1953–54, 1954–55, 1955–56, 1956–57, 1957–58, 1958–59, 1960–61, 1973–74, 1978–79, 2001–02, 2016–17	
Regional	Dodecanese FCA Cup	13	1948, 1952, 1953, 1954, 1957, 1963, 1965, 1966, 1968, 1974, 2004, 2017, 2018	
Regional	Dodecanese Super Cup	1^{s}	2019	

- record
- ^{S} Shared record
