= Veria 1960 FC =

Greek football club

Veria
- Full name: Π.Σ. Βέροια 1960 (Veria 1960 FC)
- Nicknames: Vasilissa tou Vorra (Queen of The North); Kyanerithroi (The Blue-reds)
- Founded: 2019; 7 years ago
- Ground: Veria Municipal Stadium
- Capacity: 7,000
- Chairman: Agapios Anastasiadis
- Manager: Anestis Argyriou
- League: Gamma Ethniki
- 2025–26: Gamma Ethniki (Group 2), 3rd
- Website: verianfc.gr
| Home colours | Away colours |

Veria 1960 Football Club (Greek: Ποδοσφαιρικός Σύλλογος Βέροια 1960) is a Greek professional football club based in Veria, Greece. It was founded in 2018. It plays its home matches at the Veria Municipal Stadium.

== History ==
=== Foundation ===
Veria NFC was established on July 17, 2019. During the summer transfer window in 2019, Veria's board achieved to sign some significant players like Giannis Pasas and the Argentine midfielder Marcelo Penta as their goal was to achieve promotion to Super League 2. Veria participated in the third tier championship of Greek football, Football League during 2019–20 season and finished 6th as the championship was suspended due to COVID-19 pandemic and didn't allow them to compete for the promotion in the remaining fixtures. Veria's head coach at the time was Kostas Georgiadis who succeed Theodosis Theodosiadis who was fired mid season due to club's poor performance in the league. Georgiadis and Veria terminated the contract in consensus on 23 June 2020.

=== 2020–21: Promotion to Super League 2 ===
On 28 July 2020, Veria signed the experienced Greek coach Pavlos Dermitzakis as the club's new manager. During 2020–21, Veria participated again in Football League championship as the one league, two groups plan for Super League 2 didn't go through due to a court order by the referee judges' court. Veria competed in north group where they finished 1st and won the promotion to Super League 2 for next season as champions. In the summer transfer window prior to the championship beginning and having as a goal to win the league, the club signed some significant players including Apostolos Skondras, Michalis Boukouvalas and Markos Vellidis that helped to achieve the club's goal.

=== 2021–2023: Super League 2 ===
After winning the promotion to Super League 2, the club announced the renewal of Pavlos Dermitzakis' contract as head coach for the club in July 7th, 2021. During the 2021 summer transfer window, Veria announced some significant players including Giannis Mystakidis, Petros Orfanidis and Thanasis Dinas. During the winter transfer window of the same season Veria signed the Albanian midfielder Ergys Kace. On April 27, Veria beat in an away game the team of Thesprotos with score 1–3 in the 33rd round of the league and secured the 1st place of the North group, qualifying for the promotional play off round where they'll face the winner of South group, Levadiakos and they were also named champions of their divisional group. Veria lost both games against Levadiakos to 1–0 score and qualified to the play out round of Super League Greece were they faced Lamia as their last chance to win promotion this year. Veria defeated at home 1–2 and after an away 1–1 draw at Lamia failed to achieve promotion to the top tier division.

On June 30, 2022, Bikas Group announced that the club is for sale and that they are immediately leaving the club after being disappointed by the club's failure to promote to Super League Greece blaming the Hellenic Football Federation for allowing only 1 team out of 34 to promote directly to the top tier division of the Greek football through play off games. Veria was crowned champion of the North Group of Super League 2 after 34 matchdays but was forced to participate in play off games with the South Group winner for the promotion to Super League. Under their leadership the club won 3 league titles in 4 seasons while they were forced to stay in the same division despite being champions twice.

On July 14, 2022, Veria's board informed head coach Pavlos Dermitzakis that they won't be renewing his contract.

As Bikas Group didn't find any potential buyer for the club, a group of small local businessmen decided to step forward and take charge of Veria's board for the next season for the club to keep playing in the Super League Greece 2. While Bikas Group remains the major shareholder of the club, the club is run by a new board of which chairman was appointed Stergios Diamantis.

The new board appointed Konstantinos Anyfantakis on 22 July 2022 as manager. Veria's plan for the new season as they failed to win promotion to Super League was to keep a low budget and create a team based on young local talented players and a touch of experienced ones. Anyfantakis quit Veria's job on 6 December 2022, claiming personal reasons. Giannis Mantziaridis, assistant of Anyfantakis, was appointed as a temporary head coach till Veria finds their next head manager.

After Anyfantakis departure, Veria appointed Spyros Baxevanos as head coach. During the uncertainty and tough period that Veria went through, long term captain of the club, Stelios Marangos terminated his contract citing personal reasons.

Since Anyfantakis left, the club entered a turmoil period which led to the regulation of the club to Gamma Ethniki. Consecutive managerial changes from Kostas Velitzelos to Spyros Baxevanos and then to Nikos Karydas as a caretaker, originally appointed as a director of football after Tsalouchidis departure, the team ended up with Tasos Anthimiadis as the manager for the last two fixtures of the season. Even though Veria beat at home Iraklis Larissa by 3–0, this wasn't enough to avoid regulation as their opponent beat their final matches too.

=== Veria 1960 (2024–present) ===
On 17 July 2024, the club officially changed its name to Veria 1960. In its first year competing in the regional league, Veria won the Imathia FCA championship alongside rival contender Naoussa. By securing the local title, Veria qualified for the 2025 Greek Football Clubs Association Winners' Championship special promotion tournament, through which it earned promotion and returned to national divisions.

During the 2025–26 season, upon its return to Gamma Ethniki, the team finished in third place in Group 2. Although it initially appeared to contend strongly for promotion to Super League Greece 2, a poor second half of the season cost the team that opportunity, leaving it well behind Apollon Kalamarias and Ethnikos Neo Keramidi, who secured the play-off spots for promotion.

== Crest and colours ==
The "B" in crest stands of the city of Veria while the crown stands for "Queen of the North", 2019 indicates the year of the club's foundation. The club's colours are black, white, gold, and gray. Black represents the dynamic of the team, white stands for the pure moral values and the financial stability of the club, while gray represents the fans, the soul of the club. Last but not least, gold represents the radiance of the club.

=== Kit evolution ===
| 2019–20 | 2020–21 | 2021–22 | 2022–23 |

=== Kit manufacturers and shirt sponsors ===
| Period | Kit manufacturer | Shirt sponsor |
|---|---|---|
| 2019–2021 | GSA Sport | thefoodballer |
| 2021–2022 | Nike | Dacristo |
| 2022–2023 | Zeus | N/A |

== Stadium ==
Veria Municipal Stadium is a multi-purpose stadium in Veria, Greece. It is used for football matches, and is the home stadium of the club. It was built in 1925 by members of music and gymnastics association Megas Alexandros. The stadium holds about 7,000. It is situated 1.5 kilometres (0.93 mi) off the city centre. It is the headquarters of Veria FC since the founding of the club in 2019.

== Supporters ==
The club's official supporters group is known as Club of Fans of Veria "Gate 4" and it's been supporting the club since day one.

=== Most receipts ===
| # | Match | Tickets | Score | Date |
|---|---|---|---|---|
| 1 | Veria vs Levadiakos | 4,700 | 0–1 | 8 May 2022 |
| 2 | Veria vs Lamia | 3,000 | 1–2 | 11 June 2022 |

== Honours ==
=== Domestic ===
==== League ====
- Super League 2 North Group
  - Winners (1): 2021–22
- Football League
  - Winners (1): 2020–21
- Imathia FCA Championship
  - Winners (1): 2024–25

== Season to season ==
| Season Played | Greek League | Clubs competed | Position finished | Points | W – D – L |
|---|---|---|---|---|---|
| 2018–19 | Gamma Ethniki | 14 | 1st | 57 | 17 –6 – 3 |
| 2019–20 | Football League | 14 | 7th | 31 | 9 – 7 – 7 |
| 2020–21 | Football League | 10 | 1st | 38 | 11 – 5 – 2 |
| 2021–22 | Super League 2 | 17 | 1st | 75 | 23 – 6 – 3 |
| 2022–23 | Super League 2 | 15 | 12th | 31 | 8 – 7 – 13 |
| 2023–24 | Gamma Ethniki | 18 | 13th | 32 | 8 – 8 – 18 |
| 2024–25 | Imathia FCA First Division | 11 | 1st | 70 | 22 – 4 – 0 |
| 2025–26 | Gamma Ethniki | 12 | 3rd | 47 | 14 – 5 – 8 |

=== League participation ===
- Second Division (2): 2021–2023
- Third Division (6): 2018–2021, 2023–2024, 2025–present

== Notable players ==
Greece
- (Greece) Alexandros Vergonis
- (Greece) Stelios Marangos
- (Greece) Giannis Pasas
- (Greece) Apostolos Skondras
- (Greece) Michalis Boukouvalas
- (Greece) Markos Vellidis
- (Greece) Petros Giakoumakis
- (Greece) Stavros Petavrakis
- (Greece) Georgios Bletsas

Albania

- (Albania) Ergys Kace

Argentina

- (Argentina) Marcelo Penta

Brazil

- (Brazil) Lucas Ramos

=== Most appearances ===
| # | Name | Caps | Goals |
|---|---|---|---|
| 1 | Stelios Marangos | 106 | 3 |
| 2 | Giannis Pasas | 78 | 44 |
| 3 | Georgios Bletsas | 73 | 4 |
| 4 | Stavros Petavrakis | 67 | 1 |
| 5 | Alexandros Vergonis | 61 | 0 |

=== Most goals ===
| # | Name | Caps | Goals |
|---|---|---|---|
| 1 | Giannis Pasas | 78 | 44 |
| 2 | Athanasios Kanoulas | 43 | 21 |
| 3 | Giannis Loukinas | 17 | 9 |
| 4 | Petros Giakoumakis | 36 | 8 |
| 5 | Stelios Pozoglou | 51 | 8 |

=== Managerial history ===
- (Greece) Theodosis Theodosiadis (Oct 30, 2018 – Nov 18, 2019)
- (Greece) Kostas Georgiadis (Nov 19, 2019 – Jun 23, 2020)
- (Greece) Pavlos Dermitzakis (Jul 28, 2020 – Jun 30, 2022)
- (Greece) Kostas Anyfantakis (Aug 1, 2022 – Dec 6, 2022)
- (Greece) Spyros Baxevanos (Jan 6, 2023 – May 19, 2023)
- (Greece) Nikos Karydas (caretaker) (May 19, 2023 – Jun 12, 2023)
- (Greece) Tasos Anthymiadis (caretaker) (Jun 12, 2023 – Jun 30, 2023)
- (Greece) Antonis Papatzikos (Aug 21, 2023 – Nov 6, 2023)
- (Greece) Manolis Giovanopoulos (caretaker) (Nov 6, 2023 – Nov 8, 2023)
- (Greece) Giannis Pollaetidis (Nov 8, 2023 – Mar 14, 2024)
- (Greece) Panagiotis Tsalouchidis (Mar 14, 2024 – Apr 30, 2024)
- (Greece) Stavros Kostoglidis (Jun 16, 2024 – Sep 18, 2025)
- (Greece) Giannis Pollaetidis (Sep 18, 2023 – Oct 7, 2024)
- (Greece) Dimitrios Printzios (Oct 8, 2025 – present)
