= 2023–24 Greek Football Cup =

2023–24 Greek Cup
Betsson Greek Cup

Tournament details
- Country: Greece
- Teams: 79

Final positions
- Champions: Panathinaikos (20th title)
- Runners-up: Aris

Tournament statistics
- Matches played: 87
- Goals scored: 244 (2.8 per match)
- Top goal scorer(s): Panagiotis Katsamagas (5 goals)

The 2023–24 Greek Football Cup, also named Betsson Greek Cup for sponsorship reasons, was the 82nd edition of the Greek Football Cup. Panathinaikos, as the title winners, qualified for the 2024–25 UEFA Europa League second qualifying round.

Match times up to 29 October 2023 and from 30 March 2024 were EEST (UTC+3). Times on interim ("winter") days were EET (UTC+2).

== Calendar ==
Round	Main date(s)	Fixtures	Clubs	New entries	Leagues entering
First Round	26–30 August 2023	20	79 → 59	43	Local Cup Winners
Second Round	3 September 2023	11	59 → 48	none	none
Third Round	13, 17, 20 September 2023	14	48 → 34	22	Super League 2
Fourth Round	27 September 2023	10	34 → 24	none	none
Fifth Round	7–8 October 2023	8	24 → 16	9	Super League 1, places 6–14
Round of 16	31 October–2 November & 5–7 December 2023	16	16 → 8	5	Super League 1, places 1–5
Quarter-finals	9–11, 23–25 January 2024	8	8 → 4	none	none
Semi-finals	6–8, 27–29 February 2024	4	4 → 2	none	none
Final	25 May 2024	1	2 → 1	none	none

== Qualifying rounds ==
=== First round ===
The draw took place on 11 August 2023.

==== Summary ====
Team 1	Score	Team 2
26 August 2023
Asteras Rethymno	0–3	Ialysos
Asteras Stavros	1–1 (4–2 p)	P.O. Elassona
27 August 2023
Panthrakikos	5–0	Megas Alexandros Agia Marina
A.O. Vistonida	3–4	Apollon Paralimnio
PAOK Kristoni	3–3 (2–3 p)	Vyron Kavala
Doxa Volakas	0–2	AO Chanioti
Thyella Katsikas	0–1	Pierikos
Asteras Petriti	2–0	Kastoria
Ermis Amyntaio	0–5	Anagennisi Arta
Zakynthos	3–0	Apollon Efpalio
Panagriniakos	1–2	Pamisos Messini
Pangytheatikos	1–0	A.E. Dimitsana
PAO Varda	3–1	A.P.S. Patrai
A.O. Ypato	6–0	Α.Ο. Dilinaton
Granitis Agia Marina	1–4	Asteras Kaisariani
Acharnaikos	7–0	A.S. Agioi Theodoroi
28 August 2023
Mykonos	3–0 (w/o)	Aetos Loutra
30 August 2023
Ethnikos Piraeus	5–0	P.A.O. Krousonas
Theseus Agria	1–0	P.O. Fikis
Alexandroupoli	1–0	Keravnos Angelochori
N/A
Atromitos Palamas	bye	
AO Nea Artaki	bye	
Panargiakos	bye	

==== Matches ====
26 August 2023
17:00 EEST

Asteras Rethymno	0–3	Ialysos
	Report	Chatzinikolas 30', 45+2'; Vlachavas 90+4'

Sochora Stadium, Rethymno
Referee: Vasilios Misailidis (Chania)

26 August 2023
17:00 EEST

Asteras Stavros	1–1 (a.e.t.)	P.O. Elassona
Alexiou 58'	Report	Tsiakos 16'
Penalties
Alexiou (penalty scored); Fragkos (penalty scored); Avgoustatos (penalty scored); Kakkavas (penalty scored)	4–2	(penalty missed) Lagos; (penalty scored) Pergjoni; (penalty scored) Koukoulis; (penalty missed) Karamoulas

Anthela Phiotis Municipal Stadium, Anthela
Referee: Giorgos Tasiopoulos (Thessaly)

27 August 2023
17:00 EEST

Panthrakikos	5–0	Megas Alexandros Agia Marina
Stojnović 4', 61'; Kalogranas 36', 55'; Vaskos 77'	Report

Komotini Municipal Stadium, Komotini
Referee: Vasilios Chorozoglou (Drama)

27 August 2023
17:00 EEST

A.O. Vistonida	3–4	Apollon Paralimnio
Tolmidis 21'; Giarmantzidis 81'; Boutzikoudis 82'	Report	Tarasis 14'; Katsamagas 47'; Karyofyllis 62', 68'

Municipal Stadium of Feloni, Feloni
Referee: Anastasios Tsilikas (Kavala)

27 August 2023
17:00 EEST

PAOK Kristoni	3–3 (a.e.t.)	Vyron Kavala
Kyriakidis 52'; Zaltos 89'; Agathangelidis 96'	Report	Efkarpidis 20'; A. Vlachos 67'; Mavrogiannis 98'
Penalties
Agathangelidis (penalty missed); Aivazis (penalty scored); Efthymiadis (penalty scored); Zaltos (penalty missed); Chatziaslanidis (penalty missed)	2–3	(penalty missed) A. Vlachos; (penalty missed) Chionidis; (penalty scored) Gr. Papadopoulos; (penalty scored) Babouras; (penalty scored) Toumanidis

Kilkis Municipal Stadium, Kilkis
Referee: Dimitris Kefalas (Serres)

27 August 2023
17:00 EEST

Doxa Volaka	0–2	AO Chanioti
Topouzis 42' (pen.); Thomaidis 52'	Report

Municipal Stadium of Prosotsani, Prosotsani
Referee: Konstantinos Tikozoglou (Macedonia)

27 August 2023
17:00 EEST

Thyella Katsikas	0–1	Pierikos
	Report	Kragiopoulos 90'

Katsikas Stadium, Katsikas
Referee: Loukas Rigopoulos (Imathia)

27 August 2023
17:00 EEST

Asteras Petriti	2–0	Kastoria
Georgakopoulos 15' (pen.), 19'	Report

Eps Kerkyra Ground, Corfu
Referee: Dimitrios Chatzipanagiotou (Epirus)

27 August 2023
17:00 EEST

Ermis Amyntaio	0–5	Anagennisi Arta
	Report	Papanikou 49'; Kyriakis 61', 78'; Kazelis 66', 90'

Amyntaio Municipal Stadium, Amyntaio
Referee: Dimos Tzamos (Kastoria)

27 August 2023
17:00 EEST

Zakynthos	3–0	Apollon Efpalio
Kardaris 28'; Doukas 44'; Sourmpis 67'	Report

Zakynthos Municipal Stadium, Zakynthos
Referee: Grigoris Rigopoulos (Elis)

27 August 2023
17:00 EEST

Panagriniakos	1–2	Pamisos Messini
Vasilogiannis 90'	Report	Koulopoulos 26'; Dempegiotis 48'

Municipal Stadium of Agios Konstantinos, Agios Konstantinos
Referee: Panagiotis Tsioris (Arta)

27 August 2023
17:00 EEST

Pangytheatikos	1–0	A.E. Dimitsana
Maniatis 87'	Report

New Gytheio Municipal Stadium, Gytheio
Referee: Charalampos Petropoulos (Achaea)

27 August 2023
17:00 EEST

PAO Varda	3–1	A.P.S. Patrai
Lathyris 14', 50'; Plastourgos 90+1'	Report	Gavriil 21'

Grigorios Kalakos Stadium, Varda
Referee: Alexandros Tsamouris (Piraeus)

27 August 2023
17:00 EEST

A.O. Ypato	6–0	Α.Ο. Dilinaton
Tsipras 33' (pen.); Drougas 37'; Potouridis 45+2'; Bato 54', 80'; Albanis 74'	Report

Elliopas Municipal Stadium, Elliopas
Referee: Leonidas Stavrou (West Attica)

27 August 2023
17:00 EEST

Granitis Agia Marina	1–4	Asteras Kaisariani
Drakakis 80' (pen.)	Report	Paligeorgos 67'; Zelo 73'; Sapalidis 75'; Smyrnakis 90+5'

Idomenea Galata, Chania
Referee: Emmanouil Samiotakis (Heraklion)

27 August 2023
17:00 EEST

Acharnaikos	7–0	A.S. Agion Theodoron
Vlachidis 11', 39'; Natsiopoulos 37', 49', 55'; Antonopoulos 62'; Stravomytis 80'	Report

Acharnes Stadium, Acharnes
Referee: Nontas Kolorizos (Phthiotis)

28 August 2023
17:00 EEST

Mykonos	3–0 (Awarded)	Aetos Loutra
	Report

Leonidas Giannelos Stadium, Leonidas Giannelos
Referee: Vangelis Lathyris (Piraeus)

30 August 2023
17:00 EEST

Ethnikos Piraeus	5–0	P.A.O. Krousonas
Antoniou 23' (pen.); Polyzos 27', 56'; Kourakis 45' (o.g.); Diniotakis 66'	Report

Perama Stadium, Perama
Referee: Theodoros Maranos (Athens)

30 August 2023
17:00 EEST

Theseus Agria	1–0	P.O. Fiki
I. Vlachos 44'	Report

Pantelis Magoulas Stadium, Nea Ionia
Referee: Alexandra Deligianni (Larissa)

30 August 2023
17:00 EEST

Alexandroupoli	1–0	Keravnos Angelochori
Kyrizakis 35'	Report

Fotis Kosmas Stadium, Alexandroupolis
Referee: Georgios-Rafail Drakidis (Xanthi)

=== Second round ===
The draw took place on 11 August 2023.

==== Summary ====
Team 1	Score	Team 2
3 September 2023
Asteras Stavros	2–1	Atromitos Palamas
Panthrakikos	6–0	Theseus Agria
Asteras Petriti	2–3 (a.e.t.)	AO Chanioti
Anagennisi Arta	1–1 (8–9 p)	Apollon Paralimnio
Vyron Kavala	0–2 (a.e.t.)	Pierikos
Ialysos	0–2	Ethnikos Piraeus
AO Nea Artaki	0–0 (4–5 p)	Acharnaikos
A.O. Ypato	1–1 (4–5 p)	Panargiakos
Asteras Kaisariani	2–1	A.E. Mykonos
Pamisos Messini	0–1	Zakynthos
PAO Varda	3–0	Pangytheatikos
N/A
Alexandroupoli	bye	

==== Matches ====
3 September 2023
17:00 EEST

Asteras Stavros	2–1	Atromitos Palamas
Alexiou 41', 70'	Report	Anagnopoulos 31'

Kalyvia Sporting Center, Kalyvia
Referee: Sotiris Petsas (Trikala)

3 September 2023
17:00 EEST

Panthrakikos	6–0	Theseus Agria
Silva 31'; Vaskos 32', 63' (pen.), 69'; Roubies 75'; Goutsidis 90+3' (pen.)	Report

Komotini Municipal Stadium, Komotini
Referee: Dimitris Kefalas (Serres)

3 September 2023
17:00 EEST

Asteras Petriti	2–3 (a.e.t.)	AO Chanioti
Mentis 27'; Georgakopoulos 120'	Report	Koutsikovangelis 88'; Nakov 99', 105'

Eps Kerkyra Ground, Corfu
Referee: Konstantinos Boubas (Epirus)

3 September 2023
17:00 EEST

Anagennisi Arta	1–1 (a.e.t.)	Apollon Paralimnio
Panos 39'	Report	Karyofyllis 63'
Penalties
Bekatoros (penalty scored); Papanikou (penalty scored); Dimitrelos (penalty missed); Kyriakis (penalty scored); Lisgaras (penalty scored); Pappas (penalty scored); Theodorakis (penalty scored); S. Papadopoulos (penalty scored); Kitsios (penalty scored); Mousiotitsas (penalty missed)	8–9	(penalty scored) Goumas; (penalty missed) Tsimikas; (penalty scored) Petrou; (penalty scored) Elezi; (penalty scored) Katsamagas; (penalty scored) Tsomachasvili; (penalty scored) Koutzavasilis; (penalty scored) Giannopoulos; (penalty scored) Zaverdas; (penalty scored) Bakalexis

Arta Stadium, Arta
Referee: Spyros Kazanas (Aetoloacarnania)

3 September 2023
17:00 EEST

Vyron Kavala	0–2 (a.e.t.)	Pierikos
	Report	Kyparissis 100'; Katsavakis 119'

Veroulio Stadium, Ilioupoli
Referee: Vasilios Chorozoglou (Drama)

3 September 2023
17:00 EEST

Ialysos	0–2	Ethnikos Piraeus
	Report	Kyparissis 100'; Katsavakis 119'

Municipal Stadium Ekonomideio, Ialysos
Referee: Vasilios Lamprou (East Attica)

3 September 2023
17:00 EEST

AO Nea Artaki	0–0 (a.e.t.)	Acharnaikos
	Report
Penalties
Delekos (penalty scored); Papadakis (penalty scored); Stasinopoulos (penalty missed); Lamprou (penalty scored); Taftaridis (penalty scored); Tsoupros (penalty missed)	4–5	(penalty scored) Natsiopoulos; (penalty missed) Goufas; (penalty scored) Matsoukas; (penalty scored) Manalis; (penalty scored) Tsimpourlas; (penalty scored) K. Papadopoulos

Nea Artaki Municipal Stadium, Nea Artaki
Referee: Charalampos Psaridis (Athens)

3 September 2023
17:00 EEST

A.O. Ypato	1–1 (a.e.t.)	Panargiakos
Albanis 19'	Report	Rodrigues 17'
Penalties
Tsipras (penalty missed); Baro (penalty scored); Drougas (penalty scored); Potouridis (penalty scored); Mkrtchyan (penalty scored); Bousis (penalty missed)	4–5	(penalty missed) Marinis; (penalty scored) Prikas; (penalty scored) Mougios; (penalty scored) Rokaj; (penalty scored) Karargyris; (penalty scored) Floros

Thebes Municipal Stadium, Thebes
Referee: Vangelis Lathyris (Piraeus)

3 September 2023
15:30 EEST

Asteras Kaisariani	2–1	A.E. Mykonos
Geragotellis 22'; Sapalidis 42'	Report	Muriqi 34'

Zirineio Stadium, Kifissia
Referee: Athanasios Zacharopoulos (East Attica)

3 September 2023
16:00 EEST

Pamisos Messini	0–1	Zakynthos
	Report	Sourmpis 27'

Messini Ground, Messini
Referee: Dimitris Vartsakis (Laconia)

3 September 2023
17:00 EEST

PAO Varda	3–0	Pangytheatikos
Bisa 36', 50'; Doulaveris 90'	Report

Grigorios Kalakos Stadium, Varda
Referee: Giannis Prantalos (Achaea)

=== Third round ===
The draw took place on 5 September 2023.

==== Summary ====
Team 1	Score	Team 2
13 September 2023
Acharnaikos	0–0 (3–2 p)	Panachaiki
Panthrakikos	0–3 (w/o)	Ethnikos Piraeus
AO Chanioti	0–1	Tilikratis
Panargiakos	1–1 (3–4 p)	PAO Varda
Ionikos	0–3	Athens Kallithea
OF Ierapetra	0–3 (w/o)	Kampaniakos
Apollon Paralimnio	3–0	Alexandroupoli
Makedonikos	0–4	Egaleo
Ilioupoli	1–2 (a.e.t.)	Levadiakos
Asteras Stavros	1–3	Giouchtas
17 September 2023
Chania	2–1	Apollon Pontus
Kozani	2–1	Iraklis
20 September 2023
Zakynthos	0–1	Niki Volos
27 September 2023
Aiolikos	3–0 (w/o)	Anagennisi Karditsa
N/A
Asteras Kaisariani	bye	
Almopos Aridaia	bye	
Diagoras	bye	
Kalamata	bye	
AEL	bye	
Pierikos	bye	

==== Matches ====
13 September 2023
16:00 EEST

Acharnaikos	0–0 (a.e.t.)	Panachaiki
	Report
Penalties
Natsiopoulos (penalty missed); Geronymos (penalty scored); Antonopoulos (penalty scored); Manalis (penalty scored)	3–2	(penalty scored) Ganchier; (penalty scored) Kyrsanidis; (penalty missed) Masouras; (penalty missed) Christopoulos; (penalty missed) Parastatidis

Acharnes Stadium, Acharnes
Referee: Dimitris Bekiaris (Corinthia)

13 September 2023
15:00 EEST

Panthrakikos	0–3 (Awarded)	Ethnikos Piraeus
	Report	Antoniou 29'

Komotini Municipal Stadium, Komotini
Referee: Vasilios Chorozoglou (Drama)

13 September 2023
16:00 EEST

AO Chanioti	0–1	Tilikratis
	Report	Niforopoulos 90+2'

Municipal Stadium of Kassandreia, Kassandreia
Referee: Panagiotis Tsiaras (Kavala)

13 September 2023
16:00 EEST

Panargiakos	1–1 (a.e.t.)	PAO Varda
Prikas 60'	Report	Bisa 43'
Penalties
Marinis (penalty scored); Walisson (penalty scored); Rokaj (penalty missed); Mougios (penalty scored); Floros (penalty missed)	3–4	(penalty scored) Lathyris; (penalty scored) Mikelatos; (penalty scored) Kotsonis; (penalty missed) Dionysopoulos; (penalty scored) Theofanis

Argos Municipal Stadium, Argos
Referee: Alexandros Tsamouris (Piraeus)

13 September 2023
16:00 EEST

Ionikos	0–3	Athens Kallithea
	Report	Loukinas 14', 60'; Matilla 19'

Neapoli Stadium, Nikaia
Referee: Aristidis Vatsios (West Attica)

13 September 2023
17:00 EEST

OF Ierapetra	0–3 (Awarded)	Kampaniakos
	Report

Petros Vouzounerakis Stadium, Ierapetra

13 September 2023
16:00 EEST

Apollon Paralimnio	3–0	Alexandroupoli
Katsamagas 8', 36', 57' (pen.)	Report

Paralimnio Ground, Paralimni
Referee: Konstantinos Pagonis (Thessaloniki)

13 September 2023
16:00 EEST

Makedonikos	0–4	Egaleo
	Report	Daviotis 28', 69'; Zygeridis 72'; Marathonitis 90+4'

Makedonikos Stadium, Thessaloniki
Referee: Konstantinos Poulikidis (Drama)

13 September 2023
16:00 EEST

Ilioupoli	1–2 (a.e.t.)	Levadiakos
Mandić 112'	Report	Kouiroukidis 92'; Nikas 118' (pen.)

Ilioupoli Municipal Stadium, Ilioupoli
Referee: Konstantinos Tsetsilas (Grevena)

13 September 2023
14:00 EEST

Asteras Stavros	1–3	Giouchtas
Fragkos 37'	Report	Polychronis 9'; Rovithis 61'; Kissas 66'

Lamia Municipal Stadium, Lamia
Referee: Konstantinos Bairaktaris (Athens)

17 September 2023
16:00 EEST

Chania	2–1	Apollon Pontus
Lemonis 45'; Mazoulouxis 63'	Report	Blancq 5'

Perivolia Municipal Stadium, Chania
Referee: Konstantinos Andrianos (Achaea)

17 September 2023
16:00 EEST

Kozani	2–1	Iraklis
Panos 15' (pen.); Tzimopoulos 84'	Report	Kushta 35'

Kozani Stadium, Kozani
Referee: Alexandros Tsakalidis (Chalkidiki)

20 September 2023
16:00 EEST

Zakynthos	0–1	Niki Volos
	Report	Miranda 80' (pen.)

Zakynthos Municipal Stadium, Zakynthos
Referee: Vasilios Stamos (Elis)

27 September 2023
15:00 EEST

Aiolikos	3–0 (Awarded)	Anagennisi Karditsa
	Report

Mytilene Municipal Stadium, Mytilene

=== Fourth round ===
The draw took place on 5 September 2023.

==== Summary ====
Team 1	Score	Team 2
27 September 2023
Kozani	1–2	Chania
PAO Varda	1–3	Niki Volos
Acharnaikos	1–0 (a.e.t.)	Pierikos
AEL	3–0	Tilikratis
Almopos Aridea	0–3 (w/o)	Kampaniakos
28 September 2023
Kalamata	1–1 (5–6 p)	Athens Kallithea
Asteras Kaisariani	3–1	Apollon Paralimnio
4 October 2023
Egaleo	0–2 (a.e.t.)	Diagoras
8 November 2023
Levadiakos	3–0	Aiolikos
15 November 2023
Ethnikos Piraeus	1–2	Giouchtas

==== Matches ====
27 September 2023
15:00 EEST

Kozani	1–2	Chania
Edgar 24' (o.g.)	Report	Batzios 73'; Tselios 87'

Kozani Stadium, Kozani
Referee: Konstantinos Poulikidis (Drama)

27 September 2023
16:00 EEST

PAO Varda	1–3	Niki Volos
Papachristopoulos 81'	Report	Tzioras 16' (pen.); Kritikos 48'; Kassos 90+3'

Grigorios Kalakos Stadium, Varda
Referee: Giannis Andrikopoulos (Cyclades)

27 September 2023
16:00 EEST

Acharnaikos	1–0 (a.e.t.)	Pierikos
Natsiopoulos 91' (pen.)	Report

Acharnes Stadium, Acharnes
Referee: Georgios Alatsakis (Piraeus)

27 September 2023
16:00 EEST

AEL	3–0	Tilikratis
Miltiadis 5'; Pedrozo 19'; Takidis 25' (o.g.)	Report

AEL FC Arena, Larissa
Referee: Konstantinos Bairaktaris (Athens)

27 September 2023
16:00 EEST

Almopos Aridea	0–3 (Awarded)	Kampaniakos
	Report

Aridea Municipal Stadium, Aridaia

28 September 2023
16:00 EEST

Kalamata	1–1 (a.e.t.)	Athens Kallithea
Pasas 41'	Report	Loukinas 19'
Penalties
Benítez (penalty scored); Cataldi (penalty missed); Arribas (penalty scored); Rovas (penalty scored); Raposo (penalty scored); Papatolios (penalty scored); Moser (penalty missed)	5–6	(penalty scored) Matilla; (penalty missed) Vasilogiannis; (penalty scored) Mejías; (penalty scored) Romao; (penalty scored) Loukinas; (penalty scored) Manthatis; (penalty scored) Moustakopoulos

Kalamata Municipal Stadium, Kalamata
Referee: Konstantinos Tsetsilas (Grevena)

28 September 2023
16:00 EEST

Asteras Kaisariani	3–1	Apollon Paralimnio
Stamoulis 41'; Sapalidis 47' (pen.), 86'	Report	Elezi 84' (pen.)

Zirineio Stadium, Kifissia
Referee: Nikolaos Georgopoulos (Chania)

4 October 2023
13:30 EEST

Egaleo	0–2 (a.e.t.)	Diagoras
	Report	Manias 94', 102'

Stavros Mavrothalassitis Stadium, Aigaleo
Referee: Dimitris Bekiaris (Corinthia)

8 November 2023
15:00 EET

Levadiakos	3–0	Aiolikos
Symelidis 19'; Kouiroukidis 41'; Nikolias 81'	Report

Levadia Municipal Stadium, Livadeia
Referee: Alexandros Katsikogiannis (Epirus)

15 November 2023
14:00 EET

Ethnikos Piraeus	1–2	Giouchtas
Diniotakis 66'	Report	Marchi 43'; Nikokyrakis 52'

Aspropyrgos Municipal Stadium, Aspropyrgos
Referee: Fotis Daoulas (West Attica)

=== Fifth round ===
The draw took place on 5 September 2023.

==== Summary ====
Team 1	Score	Team 2
7 October 2023
Acharnaikos	0–2	A.E. Kifisia
Asteras Kaisariani	0–2	Panserraikos
PAS Giannina	1–2	Volos
9 October 2023
Chania	3–5	OFI
Kampaniakos	1–3	Asteras Tripolis
11 October 2023
Diagoras	1–1 (3–4 p)	Panetolikos
22 November 2023
Giouchtas	0–1	Atromitos
Levadiakos	2–1	Lamia
N/A
Athens Kallithea	bye	
Niki Volos	bye	
AEL	bye	

==== Matches ====
7 October 2023
15:00 EET

Acharnaikos	0–2	A.E. Kifisia
	Report	Vafeas 32'; Peios 48'

Acharnes Stadium, Acharnes
Referee: Andreas Gamaris (Athens)

7 October 2023
15:00 EET

Asteras Kaisariani	0–2	Panserraikos
	Report	Maskanakis 42'; Aleksić 84'

Zirineio Stadium, Kifissia
Referee: Michalis Matsoukas (Aetoloacarnania)

7 October 2023
15:00 EET

PAS Giannina	1–2	Volos
Erramuspe 88' (pen.)	Report	García 32', 34'

Zosimades Stadium, Ioannina
Referee: Petros Tsagarakis (Chania)

9 October 2023
19:00 EET

Chania	3–5	OFI
Eleftheriadis 49'; Manousakis 52'; Servilakis 67'	Report	Abanda 29'; Phellype 43'; Mosquera 62', 65'; Riera 78'

Perivolia Municipal Stadium, Chania
Referee: Konstantinos Perrakis (Athens)

9 October 2023
15:00 EET

Kampaniakos	1–3	Asteras Tripolis
Pozoglou 20'	Report	Regis 25'; Mantzis 54'; Miritello 58'

Makedonikos Stadium, Thessaloniki
Referee: Spyros Zabalas (Ioannina)

11 October 2023
15:00 EET

Diagoras	1–1 (a.e.t.)	Panetolikos
Manias 31' (pen.)	Report	Voilis 22'
Penalties
Manias (penalty missed); Manolakis (penalty scored); Pardo (penalty scored); Masouras (penalty missed); Tsiantoulas (penalty scored); Fekkas (penalty missed); Nikolis (penalty missed)	3–4	(penalty scored) Mladen; (penalty missed) Baldassarra; (penalty scored) Liavas; (penalty scored) Chatzitheodoridis; (penalty missed) Pérez; (penalty missed) Bouzoukis; (penalty scored) Duarte

Diagoras Stadium, Rhodes
Referee: Konstantinos Katikos (Athens)

22 November 2023
15:00 EET

Giouchtas	0–1	Atromitos
	Report	Kuen 5'

Archanes National Stadium, Heraklion
Referee: Michalis Matsoukas (Aetoloacarnania)

22 November 2023
15:00 EET

Levadiakos	2–1	Lamia
Cuadra 58' (pen.); Poletto 66'	Report	Malçi 5'

Levadia Municipal Stadium, Livadeia
Referee: Spyros Zabalas (Ioannina)

== Knockout phase ==
Each tie in the knockout phase, apart from the quarter-finals and the semi-finals, was played by a single match. If the score was level at the end of normal time, extra time was played, followed by a penalty shoot-out if the score was still level. In the quarter-finals and the semi-finals were played over two legs, with each team playing one leg at home. The team that scored more goals on aggregate over the two legs advanced to the next round. If the aggregate score was level, the away goals rule was applied, i.e. the team that scored more goals away from home over the two legs advanced. If away goals were also equal, then extra time was played. The away goals rule was again applied after extra time, i.e. if there were goals scored during extra time and the aggregate score was still level, the visiting team advanced by virtue of more away goals scored. If no goals were scored during extra time, the winners were decided by a penalty shoot-out. In the round of 16, if the score was level at the end of normal time the two-legged rule was applied.
The mechanism of the draws for each round is as follows:

- In the draw for the Round of 16, the four Super League clubs finishing in places 1–4 in the previous season are seeded, while the clubs advancing from the Fifth Round are unseeded.
  The seeded teams are drawn against the unseeded teams, with the seeded teams hosting the second leg. The remaining 8 unseeded clubs will be drawn against one another with the team being drawn last hosting the second leg.
- In the draws for the quarter-finals onwards, there are no seedings and teams from the same group can be drawn against each other.

== Bracket ==
Round of 16
Asteras Tripolis	0	1	1
Panserraikos	2	1	3
PAOK	1	2	3
Volos	0	0	0
Panathinaikos (p)	0	1	1(7)
Olympiacos	0	1	1(6)
AEL	1	0	1
Atromitos	1	4	5
OFI	3	1	4
A.E. Kifisia	1	1	2
Panetolikos	3	2	5
Athens Kallithea	2	2	4
AEK Athens	0	1	1(2)
Aris (p)	0	1	1(4)
Levadiakos	1	0	1
Niki Volos	1	1	2

Quarter-finals
Panserraikos	0	0	0
PAOK	4	5	9
Panathinaikos	1	2	3
Atromitos	2	0	2
OFI	1	1	2
Panetolikos	2	3	5
Aris	3	2	5
Niki Volos	0	2	2

Semi-finals
PAOK	0	2	2(5)
Panathinaikos (p)	1	1	2(6)
Panetolikos	0	0	0
Aris	1	0	1

Final
Panathinaikos	1
Aris	0

== Round of 16 ==
The draw took place on 20 October 2023. Former Greek international and member of the UEFA Euro 2004 squad, Kostas Chalkias, made the draw using a manually operated lottery ball cage.

=== Summary ===
Team 1	Agg.	Team 2	1st leg	2nd leg
OFI	4–2	A.E. Kifisia	3–1	1–1
Panathinaikos	1–1 (7–6 p)	Olympiacos	1–1	0–0 (a.e.t.)
PAOK	3–0	Volos	1–0	2–0
AEK Athens	1–1 (2–4 p)	Aris	0–0	1–1 (a.e.t.)
Asteras Tripolis	1–3	Panserraikos	0–2	1–1
Levadiakos	1–2	Niki Volos	1–1	0–1
Panetolikos	5–4	Athens Kallithea	3–2	2–2
AEL	1–5	Atromitos	1–1	0–4

=== Matches ===
6 December 2023
17:30 EET

OFI	3–1	A.E. Kifisia
Toral 7', 25'; Phellype 75'	Report	Andereggen 10'

Theodoros Vardinogiannis Stadium, Heraklion
Referee: Alexandros Tsakalidis (Chalkidiki)
17 January 2024
17:00 EET

A.E. Kifisia	1–1	OFI
Konstantakopoulos 60'	Report	Phellype 90+3' (pen.)

Michalis Kritikopoulos Stadium, Kaisariani
Attendance: Behind closed doors
Referee: Michalis Matsoukas (Aetoloacarnania)

OFI won 4–2 on aggregate.

10 January 2024
21:30 EET

Panathinaikos	1–1	Olympiacos
Ioannidis 65'	Report	Alexandropoulos 45'

Leoforos Alexandras Stadium, Ampelokipoi
Attendance: Behind closed doors
Referee: Julian Weinberger (Austria)
17 January 2024
21:00 EET

Olympiacos	0–0 (a.e.t.)	Panathinaikos
	Report
Penalties
Rodinei (penalty scored); Martins (penalty scored); Jovetić (penalty scored); Podence (penalty scored); Carvalho (penalty missed); Vrousai (penalty scored); Ortega (penalty scored); Camara (penalty missed)	6–7	(penalty scored) Cantalapiedra; (penalty scored) Pérez; (penalty scored) Willian Arão; (penalty scored) Jedvaj; (penalty missed) Mladenović; (penalty scored) Kotsiras; (penalty scored) Vagiannidis; (penalty scored) Schenkeveld

Karaiskakis Stadium, Piraeus
Attendance: Behind closed doors
Referee: Dennis Higler (Netherlands)

Panathinaikos won 7–6 on penalties.

7 December 2023
19:00 EET

PAOK	1–0	Volos
Schwab 45+2' (pen.)	Report

Toumba Stadium, Thessaloniki
Referee: Angelos Evangelou (Athens)
10 January 2024
17:00 EET

Volos	0–2	PAOK
	Report	Konstantelias 17'; Schwab 73'

Panthessaliko Stadium, Volos
Attendance: Behind closed doors
Referee: Dimitrios Maloutas (Imathia)

PAOK won 3–0 on aggregate.

10 January 2024
19:30 EET

AEK Athens	0–0	Aris
	Report

Agia Sophia Stadium, Nea Filadelfeia
Attendance: Behind closed doors
Referee: Matej Jug (Slovenia)
17 January 2024
19:00 EET

Aris	1–1 (a.e.t.)	AEK Athens
Morón 58'	Report	Gaćinović 45+1'
Penalties
Fabiano (penalty scored); Morón (penalty scored); Fetfatzidis (penalty missed); Darida (penalty scored); Verstraete (penalty scored)	4–2	(penalty missed) Vida; (penalty scored) Van Weert; (penalty missed) Ponce; (penalty scored) Pineda

Kleanthis Vikelidis Stadium, Thessaloniki
Attendance: Behind closed doors
Referee: Nikola Dabanović (Montenegro)

Aris won 4–2 on penalties.

5 December 2023
17:00 EET

Asteras Tripolis	0–2	Panserraikos
	Report	Tomás 38'; Gotzamanidis 56'

Theodoros Kolokotronis Stadium, Tripoli
Referee: Stavros Tsimenteridis (Kozani)
10 January 2024
15:00 EET

Panserraikos	1–1	Asteras Tripolis
Aleksić 56'	Report	Mantzis 16'

Serres Municipal Stadium, Serres
Referee: Anastasios Papapetrou (Athens)

Panserraikos won 3–1 on aggregate.

7 December 2023
15:00 EET

Levadiakos	1–1	Niki Volos
Romo 40'	Report	Politis 16'

Levadia Municipal Stadium, Livadeia
Referee: Andreas Vlachos (East Attica)
18 January 2024
19:00 EET

Niki Volos	1–0	Levadiakos
Litenas 17'	Report

Panthessaliko Stadium, Volos
Referee: Konstantinos Poulikidis (Drama)

Niki Volos won 2–1 on aggregate.

5 December 2023
19:30 EET

Panetolikos	3–2	Athens Kallithea
Mavrias 63'; João Pedro 88'; Karelis 90+1'	Report	Moustakopoulos 21'; Matilla 50'

Panetolikos Stadium, Agrinio
Referee: Dimitris Maloutas (Imathia)
17 January 2024
15:00 EET

Athens Kallithea	2–2	Panetolikos
Loukinas 37'; Torres 90+1'	Report	Duarte 7'; Juanpi 12'

Grigoris Lamprakis Stadium, Kallithea
Referee: Spyros Zampalas (Epirus)

Panetolikos won 5–4 on aggregate.

6 December 2023
15:30 EET

AEL	1–1	Atromitos
Ogboe 80'	Report	Jubitana 90+5'

AEL FC Arena, Larissa
Referee: Panagiotis Tsiaras (Kavala)
16 January 2024
19:00 EET

Atromitos	4–0	AEL
Trimmatis 39'; Angielski 50' (pen.); Tsakmakis 84'; Vergos 90+3'	Report

Peristeri Stadium, Peristeri
Attendance: Behind closed doors
Referee: Aristidis Vatsios (West Attica)

Atromitos won 5–1 on aggregate.

== Quarter-finals ==
The draw took place on 20 October 2023, after the Round of 16 draw.

=== Summary ===
Team 1	Agg.	Team 2	1st leg	2nd leg
Aris	5–2	Niki Volos	3–0	2–2
OFI	2–5	Panetolikos	1–2	1–3
Panathinaikos	3–2	Atromitos	1–2	2–0
Panserraikos	0–9	PAOK	0–4	0–5

=== Matches ===
24 January 2024
18:00 EET

Aris	3–0	Niki Volos
Darida 58', 90+3'; Suleymanov 90+6'	Report

Kleanthis Vikelidis Stadium, Thessaloniki
Attendance: Behind closed doors
Referee: Christos Vergetis (Arcardia)
30 January 2024
19:00 EET

Niki Volos	2–2	Aris
Kassos 35'; Ribeiro 46'	Report	Saverio 27', 69'

Panthessaliko Stadium, Volos
Referee: Alexandros Tsakalidis (Chalkidiki)

Aris won 5–2 on aggregate.

23 January 2024
19:00 EET

OFI	1–2	Panetolikos
Bakić 47'	Report	João Pedro 19'; Karelis 90+4'

Theodoros Vardinogiannis Stadium, Heraklion
Attendance: Behind closed doors
Referee: Konstantinos Katoikos (Athens)
31 January 2024
17:00 EET

Panetolikos	3–1	OFI
Duarte 38'; Chatzitheodoridis 59'; Pérez 90+3'	Report	Iseka 59'

Panetolikos Stadium, Agrinio
Attendance: Behind closed doors
Referee: Fotios Polichronis (Pieria)

Panetolikos won 5–2 on aggregate.

24 January 2024
21:00 EET

Panathinaikos	1–2	Atromitos
Aitor 11'	Report	Angielski 25'; Jubitana 42'

Leoforos Alexandras Stadium, Ampelokipoi
Attendance: Behind closed doors
Referee: Aristotelis Diamantopoulos (Arcardia)
31 January 2024
19:00 EET

Atromitos	0–2	Panathinaikos
	Report	Pérez 35'; Mladenović 90+4'

Peristeri Stadium, Peristeri
Attendance: Behind closed doors
Referee: Angelos Evangelou (Athens)

Panathinaikos won 3–2 on aggregate.

17 January 2024
17:00 EET

Panserraikos	0–4	PAOK
	Report	Näsberg 9'; Sastre 23'; Marcos Antônio 69'; Živković 78'

Serres Municipal Stadium, Serres
Attendance: Behind closed doors
Referee: Konstantinos Tsetsilas (Grevena)
31 January 2024
21:00 EET

PAOK	5–0	Panserraikos
Tzimas 21'; Živković 26'; André Ricardo 83'; Thomas 85'; Konstantelias 90+1'	Report

Toumba Stadium, Thessaloniki
Attendance: Behind closed doors
Referee: Panagiotis Tsiaras (Kavala)

PAOK won 9–0 on aggregate.

== Semi-finals ==
The draw took place on 20 October 2023, after the quarter-final draw. On 2 February 2024 Hellenic Football Federation announced the complete schedule of the semi-final stage

=== Summary ===
Team 1	Agg.	Team 2	1st leg	2nd leg
PAOK	2–2 (5–6 p)	Panathinaikos	0–1	2–1 (a.e.t.)
Panetolikos	0–1	Aris	0–1	0–0

=== Matches ===
14 February 2024
19:30 EET

PAOK	0–1	Panathinaikos
	Report	Šporar 53'

Toumba Stadium, Thessaloniki
Referee: Allard Lindhout (Netherlands)
21 February 2024
19:00 EET

Panathinaikos	1–2 (a.e.t.)	PAOK
Limnios 120+9'	Report	Živković 72'; Kędziora 105'
Penalties
Šporar (penalty missed); Jeremejeff (penalty scored); Bakasetas (penalty scored); Kotsiras (penalty scored); Mladenović (penalty scored); Limnios (penalty missed); Mancini (penalty scored); Arão (penalty missed); Schenkeveld (penalty scored)	6–5	(penalty scored) Koulierakis; (penalty scored) Murg; (penalty scored) Kędziora; (penalty scored) Meïté; (penalty missed) Despodov; (penalty missed) Ozdoyev; (penalty scored) Antônio; (penalty missed) Otto; (penalty missed) Samatta

Leoforos Alexandras Stadium, Ampelokipoi
Referee: Daniel Siebert (Germany)

13 February 2024
19:30 EET

Panetolikos	0–1	Aris
	Report	Vélez 64'

Panetolikos Stadium, Agrinio
Referee: Aristotelis Diamantopoulos (Arcardia)
6 March 2024
19:00 EET

Aris	0–0	Panetolikos
	Report

Kleanthis Vikelidis Stadium, Thessaloniki
Referee: Anastasios Papapetrou (Athens)

== Final ==
25 May 2024
20:30 EEST

Panathinaikos	1–0	Aris
Vagiannidis 90+7'	Report

Panthessaliko Stadium, Volos
Attendance: Behind closed doors
Referee: Stéphanie Frappart (France)

== Top scorers ==
Rank	Player	Club	Goals
1	(Greece) Panagiotis Katsamagas	Apollon Paralimnio	5
2	(Greece) Giannis Loukinas	Athens Kallithea	4
2	(Greece) Stamatis Sapalidis	Asteras Kaisarianis	4
2	(Greece) Alexandros Natsiopoulos	Acharnaikos	4
5	(Greece) Michalis Manias	Diagoras	3
5	(Greece) Konstantinos Georgakopoulos	Asteras Petriti	3
5	(Greece) Christos Alexiou	Asteras Stavrou	3
5	(Greece) Vasilios Karyofyllis	Apollon Paralimnio	3
5	(Greece) Athanasios Bisa	Pamvouprasiakos Varda	3
5	(Serbia) Andrija Živković	PAOK	3
5	(Brazil) Luiz Phellype	OFI	3

Source: epo.gr
