= 2024–25 Gamma Ethniki =

Greek 3rd tier football season

Gamma Ethniki
- Season: 2024–25
- Dates: 22 September 2024 - 4 May 2025
- Champions: Nestos Chrysoupoli (Group 1); Anagennisi Karditsa (Group 2); Hellas Syros (Group 3); Marko (Group 4)
- Promoted: Nestos Chrysoupoli (Group 1); Anagennisi Karditsa (Group 2); Hellas Syros(Group 3); Marko (Group 4)
- Relegated: Group 1: Apollon Paralimnio; Alexandroupoli; Aris Avato; Aris Piges; PAO Pontioi Nea Amisos; Chaniotis; Moudania Group 2: Aiginiakos; Olympiacos Volos; Atromitos Palamas; Amvrakikos Vonitsa; Ermis Amyntaio; Svoronos; Asteras Petriti Group 3: Apollon Efpalio; Malesina 2008; Pannafpliakos; Aigeas Plomari Group 4: Agios Nikolaos; Karavas Piraeus; Mandraikos; Thiva; Tympaki; Rethymniakos
- Goals: 2,603
- Top goalscorer: Florence Keri - Pierikos (26 goals)
- Biggest home win: Poseidon Nea Michaniona 10–0 Moudania (Group 1)
- Biggest away win: Aris Piges 0–6 Kilkisiakos (Group 1); Amvrakikos Vonitsa 0–6 Pierikos (Group 2)
- Highest scoring: Poseidon Nea Michaniona 10–0 Moudania (Group 1)
- All statistics correct as of 4 May 2025.

The 2024–25 Gamma Ethniki was the 43rd season since the official establishment of the championship in 1982 and the 3rd tier of Greek football after the restructuring of 2021. It has an amateur character, while the Hellenic Football Federation (HFF) is responsible for the conduct of the championship.

The competition started in September 2024, and was concluded on 4 May 2025, and was conducted in four groups, the same as the previous 2023–24 season. 69 teams were participating and 25 of them were relegated at the end of the season. The groups were formed according to geographical criteria. For the 2024-2025 competition season, the deadline for submitting the Declarations of Participation was 19 July 2024 for the teams with the right to participate and until 29 July 2024 for the teams invited to fill the gaps, created from the teams that, even though they had earned the right to participate, had chosen to withdraw.

== Team changes ==
Did not declare participation

- Aiolikos
- Panathinaikos B
- Olympiacos B
- Niki Efkarpia
- Kileler
- Ialysos
- Ypato
- Proodeftiki
- Almyros Gazi
- Ellopiakos
- Keravnos Keratea
- Panagriniakos
- Panarkadikos

Invited to fill the gaps

- Aris Piges
- PAO Pontioi Nea Amisos
- Moudania
- Aiginiakos
- Ermis Amyntaio
- Atromitos Palamas
- Thiva
- Pannafpliakos
- Rethymniakos
- Karavas Piraeus

== Way of Conduct ==
After all games of the four groups were played, the champion of each group was promoted to Super League 2. A total of 25 teams were relegated to Local FCA Championships. From Group 1 and Group 2, which consisted of eighteen (18) teams, seven (7) teams were relegated to the lower division (the teams that occupied positions 12 to 18). From Group 3 consisted of sixteen (16) teams, five (5) teams were relegated to the lower division (the teams that occupied positions 12 to 16). From Group 4, which consisted of seventeen (17) teams, six (6) teams were relegated to the lower division (the teams that occupied positions 12 to 17).

== Group 1 ==
=== Teams ===
Location of teams in Group 1 of 2024-25 Gamma Ethniki

Team	Location	Last season
Alexandroupoli	Alexandroupoli	Evros FCA Champion
Apollon Kalamarias	Kalamaria	SL2 North Group 12th
Apollon Krya Vrysi	Krya Vrysi	Pella FCA Champion
Apollon Paralimnio	Paralimnio	Group 1, 10th
Aris Avato	Avato	Group 1, 5th
Aris Piges	Kavala	Kavala FCA Champion
Chaniotis	Chaniotis	Group 1, 4th
Evosmos	Evosmos	Macedonia FCA Champion
Iraklis Ammoudia	Serres	Serres FCA Champion
Kilkisiakos	Kilkis	Kilkis FCA Champion
Moudania	Nea Moudania	Chalkidiki FCA champion
Nestos Chrysoupoli	Chrysoupoli	Group 1, 2nd
Orestis Orestiada	Orestiada	Group 1, 9th
Panthrakikos	Komotini	Group 1, 3rd
PAOK Kristoni	Kristoni	Group 1, 8th
PAO Pontioi Nea Amisos	Drama	Drama FCA Champion
Poseidon Nea Michaniona	Michaniona	Group 1, 6th
Thermaikos	Thermi	Group 1, 7th

=== Standings ===
Pos	Team	Pld	W	D	L	GF	GA	GD	Pts	Promotion or relegation
1	Nestos Chrysoupoli (C, P)	34	28	4	2	79	15	+64	88	Promotion to Super League 2
2	Panthrakikos (Note: Panthrakikos was punished by the HFF Disciplinary Committee with a loss of the 7th matchday against PAO Pontioi Nea Amisos, with a result of 0-3, as well as a penalty of 3 points deduction, due to the illegal participation of the footballer Athanasios Stoinovic. Following a decision by the Appeals Committee, the case is remitted for trial, in first instance, before the same Disciplinary Committee of the H.F.F. On December 30, the case was heard again, with the committee reinstating the original penalties of nullification and deduction of points.)	34	28	5	1	78	17	+61	86	
3	Apollon Kalamarias	34	24	2	8	60	19	+41	74	
4	Poseidon Nea Michaniona	34	20	6	8	77	38	+39	66	
5	PAOK Kristoni	34	19	5	10	54	32	+22	62	
6	Apollon Krya Vrysi	34	15	9	10	49	36	+13	54	
7	Iraklis Ammoudia (R)	34	14	9	11	44	32	+12	51	Withdrew
8	Evosmos	34	13	10	11	49	42	+7	49	
9	Kilkisiakos	34	11	14	9	42	42	0	47	
10	Thermaikos (Note: Thermaikos was punished by the HFF Disciplinary Committee with a loss of the 7th matchday against Apollon Krya Vrysi, with a result of 0-3, as well as a penalty of 3 points deduction, due to not sufficient participation of juvenile football players.)	34	14	7	13	41	34	+7	46	
11	Orestis Orestiada	34	12	8	14	30	39	−9	44	
12	Apollon Paralimnio (R)	34	11	9	14	30	37	−7	42	Relegation to Local FCA championships
13	Alexandroupoli (R)	34	11	6	17	40	39	+1	39	Relegation to Local FCA championships
14	Aris Avato (R)	34	9	6	19	40	49	−9	33	Relegation to Local FCA championships
15	Aris Piges (R)	34	8	5	21	24	68	−44	29	Relegation to Local FCA championships
16	PAO Pontioi Nea Amisos (R)	34	5	4	25	29	76	−47	19	Relegation to Local FCA championships
17	Chaniotis (Note: Chaniotis withdrew from the championship in December 2024, before the 17th matchday. It was punished by deducting 9 points from this year's championship, and 9 points from the next championship in which it will compete.) (R)	33	5	6	22	18	65	−47	12	Withdrew
18	Moudania (Note: Moudania withdrew from the championship in December 2024, before the 17th matchday. It was punished by deducting 9 points from this year's championship, and 9 points from the next championship in which it will compete.) (R)	33	0	1	32	7	111	−104	−8	Withdrew

Source: Hellenic Football Federation: 2024-25 Match Schedule (Group 1) (in Greek)
Rules for classification: 1) points; 2) head-to-head points; 3) head-to-head goal difference; 4) goal difference; 5) goals scored.
(C) Champions; (P) Promoted; (R) Relegated

=== Results ===
Home \ Away	ALE	APK	AKV	APP	AVA	ARP	CHA	EVO	IRM	KIL	MOU	NES	ORO	PAN	PKR	PNA	POS	THE
Alexandroupoli	—	2–0	0–1	2–1	2–1	0–2	0–1	2–4	3–0	1–1	6–1	1–2	1–1	1–2	1–2	3–0	3–1	1–0
Apollon Kalamarias	1–0	—	1–0	1–0	3–0	6–0	3–0	4–0	0–1	4–1	3–0	0–1	1–0	1–2	1–0	3–0	1–0	1–0
Apollon Krya Vrysi	2–1	0–2	—	1–1	1–0	4–1	3–0	0–0	1–2	1–1	3–0	1–1	0–0	0–2	2–1	1–1	0–0	0–1
Apollon Paralimnio	1–0	1–0	0–0	—	3–1	2–0	0–4	0–0	1–1	1–1	1–0	0–1	1–0	0–2	0–0	2–0	2–4	0–0
Aris Avato	1–1	0–1	1–2	2–1	—	2–0	1–0	3–2	0–1	0–0	5–0	0–2	4–0	1–3	0–1	4–1	2–3	1–2
Aris Piges	1–0	1–1	0–3	2–0	1–0	—	3–0	0–3	0–0	0–6	2–1	0–3	1–2	0–4	1–2	3–1	0–1	0–1
Chaniotis	0–3	2–3	0–1	0–3	0–3	1–1	—	0–3	0–3	0–0	—	0–3	0–3	1–2	1–1	0–0	0–3	2–2
Evosmos	2–0	2–1	4–1	4–2	2–2	0–0	0–1	—	1–1	0–0	3–0	0–2	4–0	0–2	0–2	5–1	1–4	1–2
Iraklis Ammoudia	0–0	0–1	1–5	0–0	2–0	2–0	3–0	1–2	—	2–0	4–1	1–1	1–2	1–2	0–2	3–0	1–1	0–0
Kilkisiakos	2–0	2–1	1–1	1–1	2–2	0–0	3–0	2–2	1–0	—	3–0	0–4	0–0	0–3	2–4	2–0	0–0	1–1
Moudania	0–3	0–5	1–2	0–3	0–3	0–3	0–2	0–0	0–3	0–3	—	0–3	0–2	1–3	1–2	1–4	0–3	0–3
Nestos Chrysoupoli	1–0	2–0	3–0	2–0	3–1	3–1	2–1	0–0	2–0	6–1	9–0	—	3–0	0–1	1–0	4–0	2–2	2–1
Orestis Orestiada	0–0	0–3	2–1	2–0	2–0	1–0	0–1	1–2	2–1	1–2	3–0	0–2	—	1–2	0–0	3–1	1–1	1–0
Panthrakikos	0–0	0–0	4–1	2–1	3–0	7–0	3–0	2–0	1–1	3–0	3–0	1–0	3–0	—	0–0	0–3	4–1	4–0
PAOK Kristoni	2–0	1–2	2–1	1–0	4–0	3–0	3–0	2–0	2–4	0–1	3–0	1–3	2–0	0–0	—	3–0	1–3	1–2
PAO Pontioi Nea Amisos	1–3	0–2	0–4	0–1	0–0	2–1	3–0	0–1	0–3	1–2	3–0	0–2	0–0	1–3	2–3	—	1–2	1–3
Poseidon Nea Michaniona	4–0	1–3	3–1	3–0	1–0	4–0	1–1	3–0	0–1	2–1	10–0	1–2	2–0	1–3	4–2	4–1	—	3–2
Thermaikos	1–0	0–1	0–2	0–1	0–0	3–0	3–0	1–1	1–0	1–0	3–0	1–2	0–0	1–2	0–1	5–1	2–1	—

Source: Hellenic Football Federation: 2024-25 Match Schedule (Group 1) (in Greek)
Legend: Blue = home team win; Yellow = draw; Red = away team win.
For upcoming matches, an "a" indicates there is an article about the rivalry between the two participants.

== Group 2 ==
=== Teams ===
Location of teams in Group 2 of 2024-25 Gamma Ethniki

Team	Location	Last season
Aiginiakos	Aiginio	Pieria FCA Champion
Alexandreia	Alexandreia	Imathia FCA Champion
Amvrakikos Vonitsa	Vonitsa	Aetoloacarnania FCA Champion
Anagennisi Arta	Arta	Group 2, 6th
Anagennisi Karditsa	Karditsa	SL2 North Group, 11th
Anthoupoli	Larissa	Larissa FCA Champion
Aris Filiates	Filiates	Thesprotia FCA Champion
Asteras Petriti	Petriti	Group 2 ,11th
Atromitos Palamas	Palamas	Karditsa FCA Champion
Ermis Amyntaio	Amyntaio	Florina FCA Champion
Kozani	Kozani	SL2 North Group, 9th
Olympiacos Volos	Volos	Thessaly FCA Champion
Pierikos	Katerini	Group 2, 5th
Svoronos	Svoronos	Group 2, 3rd
Tilikratis	Lefkada	SL2 South Group, 12th
Thesprotos	Igoumenitsa	Group 2, 10th
Trikala	Trikala	Group 2, 9th
Zakynthos	Zakynthos	Group 2, 4th

=== Standings ===
Pos	Team	Pld	W	D	L	GF	GA	GD	Pts	Promotion or relegation
1	Anagennisi Karditsa (C, P)	34	28	4	2	77	11	+66	88	Promotion to Super League 2
2	Pierikos	34	27	6	1	79	10	+69	87	
3	Anagennisi Arta	34	16	8	10	41	34	+7	56	
4	Tilikratis	34	16	8	10	54	32	+22	56	
5	Thesprotos	34	14	12	8	34	22	+12	54	
6	Anthoupoli	34	15	9	10	39	24	+15	54	
7	Trikala	34	15	8	11	48	29	+19	53	
8	Zakynthos	34	15	8	11	54	33	+21	53	
9	Kozani	34	15	7	12	47	36	+11	52	
10	Aris Filiates	34	13	11	10	52	32	+20	50	
11	Alexandreia	34	12	14	8	40	31	+9	50	
12	Aiginiakos (R)	34	15	5	14	44	54	−10	50	Relegation to Local FCA championships
13	Olympiacos Volos (R)	34	12	11	11	38	38	0	47	Relegation to Local FCA championships
14	Atromitos Palamas (R)	34	10	8	16	31	46	−15	38	Relegation to Local FCA championships
15	Amvrakikos Vonitsa (R)	34	5	8	21	32	67	−35	23	Relegation to Local FCA championships
16	Ermis Amyntaio (R)	34	2	3	29	23	103	−80	9	Relegation to Local FCA championships
17	Svoronos (Note: Svoronos withdrew from the championship in February 2025, before the 24th matchday. It was punished by deducting 9 points from this year's championship, and 9 points from the next championship in which it will compete.) (R)	33	3	7	23	14	67	−53	7	Withdrew
18	Asteras Petriti (Note: Asteras Petriti withdrew from the championship in December 2024, before the 17th matchday. It was punished by deducting 9 points from this year's championship, and 9 points from the next championship in which it will compete.) (R)	33	2	3	28	14	93	−79	0	Withdrew

Source: Hellenic Football Federation: 2024-25 Match Schedule (Group 2) (in Greek)
Rules for classification: 1) points; 2) head-to-head points; 3) head-to-head goal difference; 4) goal difference; 5) goals scored.
(C) Champions; (P) Promoted; (R) Relegated

=== Results ===
Home \ Away	AIG	ALE	AMV	ANA	ANK	ANT	ARF	ASP	ATR	ERM	KOZ	OLV	PIE	SVO	TIL	THE	TRI	ZAK
Aiginiakos	—	0–1	3–3	3–2	1–5	1–0	0–5	3–0	0–1	3–0	2–1	1–0	0–3	2–1	2–1	1–0	1–1	2–1
Alexandreia	2–1	—	1–1	1–1	0–1	0–2	0–0	4–1	4–2	2–1	1–1	0–0	0–0	3–0	1–2	0–0	3–1	3–2
Amvrakikos Vonitsa	1–4	0–0	—	0–3	0–1	1–3	0–3	3–1	1–2	5–1	0–0	1–1	0–6	3–0	2–2	0–1	0–2	0–4
Anagennisi Arta	2–0	1–0	1–0	—	0–5	1–1	2–1	2–0	2–1	2–0	0–1	1–2	0–4	3–0	1–1	1–2	2–1	0–0
Anagennisi Karditsa	2–0	2–0	3–0	2–0	—	1–0	3–1	3–0	3–0	8–0	4–1	5–0	0–0	3–0	2–0	1–0	2–0	1–0
Anthoupoli	0–1	2–0	2–0	0–0	0–0	—	2–1	3–0	2–0	1–1	1–0	2–0	0–1	2–0	1–0	1–1	0–3	1–0
Aris Filiates	1–1	2–0	0–0	2–1	0–1	1–0	—	3–0	1–1	6–0	0–0	1–1	2–4	2–0	3–1	0–0	1–1	1–2
Asteras Petriti	1–3	0–3	0–3	0–3	2–4	0–3	0–2	—	1–0	0–0	0–3	4–0	0–3	1–1	0–3	2–2	0–3	0–3
Atromitos Palamas	0–0	0–1	2–0	1–0	0–4	1–0	0–1	3–0	—	2–1	0–3	0–0	0–1	3–0	2–2	0–0	2–1	0–0
Ermis Amyntaio	1–3	0–3	3–3	0–1	0–2	1–3	0–4	3–0	1–4	—	0–1	1–2	0–4	3–0	1–4	0–4	0–3	0–3
Kozani	3–1	1–2	1–0	1–0	3–1	1–1	1–0	4–0	1–1	5–0	—	2–1	0–0	0–1	1–2	1–2	1–4	2–1
Olympiacos Volos	1–0	1–1	1–0	1–2	1–0	1–1	2–2	3–0	2–1	4–0	3–1	—	1–1	3–1	0–1	0–1	2–1	0–0
Pierikos	3–1	2–0	5–0	1–1	0–1	1–0	4–0	7–0	1–0	5–0	2–0	3–2	—	3–0	1–0	3–0	3–0	2–0
Svoronos	0–3	1–1	1–2	1–2	0–0	0–2	0–3	3–0	2–2	3–2	0–3	0–0	0–1	—	0–3	0–0	0–3	0–4
Tilikratis	6–0	0–0	1–0	0–1	1–3	0–2	1–1	4–0	2–0	4–1	2–0	2–1	2–2	0–1	—	1–1	2–0	3–1
Thesprotos	2–0	1–1	2–1	0–0	0–2	1–0	0–0	3–0	4–0	3–1	1–0	1–0	0–1	1–1	0–1	—	1–0	0–0
Trikala	0–0	0–0	4–1	0–0	0–1	0–0	1–0	3–0	3–0	3–0	2–2	0–1	0–1	3–0	1–0	1–0	—	2–1
Zakynthos	4–1	2–0	3–1	2–3	1–1	3–1	3–2	3–1	2–0	3–1	1–2	1–1	0–1	1–0	0–0	2–0	1–1	—

Source: Hellenic Football Federation: 2024-25 Match Schedule (Group 2) (in Greek)
Legend: Blue = home team win; Yellow = draw; Red = away team win.
For upcoming matches, an "a" indicates there is an article about the rivalry between the two participants.

== Group 3 ==
=== Teams ===
Location of teams in Group 3 of 2024-25 Gamma Ethniki

Team	Location	Last season
AER Afantou	Afantou	Group 3, 11th
Aigeas Plomari	Plomari	Lesvos FCA Champion
Amarynthiakos	Amarynthos	Euboea FCA Champion
Apollon Efpalio	Efpalio	Phocis FCA Champion
Asteras Stavros	Stavros	Group 2, 8th
Hellas Syros	Ermoupoli	Group 3, 4th
Korinthos	Corinth	Group 3, 2nd
Loutraki	Loutraki	Corinthia FCA Champion
Malesina 2008	Malesina	Phthiotis FCA Champion
Miltiadis Pyrgos Trifilia	Pyrgos Trifilia	Messinia FCA champion
Mykonos	Mykonos	Cyclades FCA Champion
Nea Artaki	Nea Artaki	Group 2, 2nd
Pangitheatikos	Gytheio	Laconia FCA Champion
Panegialios	Aigio	Group 3, 8th
Pannafpliakos	Nafplio	Argolis FCA Champion
Rodos	Rhodes	Group 3, 7th

=== Standings ===
Pos	Team	Pld	W	D	L	GF	GA	GD	Pts	Promotion or relegation
1	Hellas Syros (C, P)	30	24	4	2	68	13	+55	76	Promotion to Super League 2
2	Korinthos	30	22	4	4	61	14	+47	70	
3	Nea Artaki	30	16	8	6	46	24	+22	56	
4	Mykonos	30	13	10	7	41	32	+9	49	
5	Loutraki	30	13	8	9	42	27	+15	47	
6	Rodos	30	12	8	10	35	31	+4	44	
7	Asteras Stavros	30	11	9	10	37	34	+3	42	
8	Panegialios	30	11	8	11	37	36	+1	41	
9	Miltiadis Pyrgos Trifilia	30	11	7	12	33	35	−2	40	
10	AER Afantou	30	12	4	14	30	36	−6	40	
11	Amarynthiakos	30	8	11	11	21	36	−15	35	
12	Pangitheatikos	30	9	4	17	31	55	−24	31	
13	Apollon Efpalio (R)	30	7	8	15	32	45	−13	29	Relegation to Local FCA championships
14	Malesina 2008 (R)	30	6	7	17	26	49	−23	25	Relegation to Local FCA championships
15	Pannafpliakos (R)	30	5	4	21	21	59	−38	19	Relegation to Local FCA championships
16	Aigeas Plomari (Note: By decision of the Disciplinary Committee, Aigeas Plomari has been given a zero penalty in the away game against Mykonos (14/3/2025) and a penalty of 3 points deducted from the current season and 3 points deducted from the next season.) (R)	30	6	4	20	18	53	−35	19	Relegation to Local FCA championships

Source: Hellenic Football Federation: 2024-25 Match Schedule (Group 3) (in Greek)
Rules for classification: 1) points; 2) head-to-head points; 3) head-to-head goal difference; 4) goal difference; 5) goals scored.
(C) Champions; (P) Promoted; (R) Relegated

=== Results ===
Home \ Away	AFA	AIG	AMA	APF	ASS	ELL	KOR	LOU	MAL	MIL	MYK	NAR	PNG	PAN	PNF	ROD
AER Afantou	—	1–0	0–3	1–0	1–1	0–2	0–4	3–1	3–1	4–0	0–1	2–1	1–0	3–1	2–0	0–2
Aigeas Plomari	1–0	—	1–3	2–1	0–0	2–1	0–2	1–2	2–0	0–0	1–1	0–2	3–0	1–3	1–3	0–3
Amarynthiakos	0–1	1–0	—	0–0	1–0	0–2	0–1	1–1	0–0	1–0	1–1	1–1	1–1	1–0	1–0	1–1
Apollon Efpalio	2–1	0–0	2–0	—	0–1	0–0	2–2	0–2	1–1	0–1	2–1	2–5	0–1	0–0	3–0	0–1
Asteras Stavros	2–2	2–0	0–0	2–0	—	1–3	0–1	3–1	4–2	0–1	1–1	1–2	4–0	1–2	2–0	1–1
Hellas Syros	2–1	6–0	3–0	2–0	3–0	—	0–0	4–1	4–1	0–0	1–0	3–0	3–0	5–0	3–0	3–2
Korinthos	3–0	2–0	3–0	3–0	6–2	0–1	—	0–2	2–0	4–0	1–2	1–0	6–1	1–0	2–0	4–0
Loutraki	0–0	1–0	7–0	2–0	2–2	0–2	0–1	—	1–0	4–0	2–2	0–2	3–1	0–0	2–0	1–1
Malesina 2008	0–1	1–0	3–1	1–3	0–1	0–0	0–1	1–0	—	3–0	1–0	1–1	1–2	0–0	2–1	1–2
Miltiadis Pyrgos Trifilia	1–0	4–0	4–0	1–2	0–1	1–2	0–0	1–0	0–0	—	1–1	2–2	2–0	2–0	6–1	3–1
Mykonos	2–0	3–0	0–0	2–1	1–0	1–5	2–1	0–3	4–3	2–1	—	3–0	2–0	0–0	1–1	0–1
Nea Artaki	1–0	1–0	0–0	0–0	1–2	2–1	1–2	1–0	4–0	2–0	1–1	—	4–0	4–0	0–0	2–0
Pangitheatikos	1–0	4–1	1–1	3–1	1–0	0–1	0–5	0–2	1–0	0–0	2–3	1–2	—	2–1	5–0	0–1
Panegialios	2–0	3–1	1–0	3–4	2–2	0–1	0–1	1–2	6–1	3–1	1–1	0–0	2–2	—	2–0	1–0
Pannafpliakos	1–2	0–1	2–1	4–3	0–1	0–3	0–1	0–0	2–2	2–0	0–3	0–2	3–2	0–1	—	0–4
Rodos	1–1	3–0	0–2	3–3	0–0	0–2	1–1	0–0	2–0	0–1	1–0	1–2	2–0	0–2	1–0	—

Source: Hellenic Football Federation: 2024-25 Match Schedule (Group 3) (in Greek)
Legend: Blue = home team win; Yellow = draw; Red = away team win.
For upcoming matches, an "a" indicates there is an article about the rivalry between the two participants.

== Group 4 ==
=== Teams ===
Location of teams in Group 4 of 2024-25 Gamma Ethniki

Team	Location	Last season
Agios Nikolaos	Agios Nikolaos	Group 4, 8th
Aris Petroupolis	Petroupoli	Group 4, 4th
Asteras Kaisariani	Kaisariani	Athens FCA Group 1 Champion
Asteras Vari	Vari	Group 3, 5th
Atsalenios	Heraklion (Atsalenio neighborhood)	Group 4, 7th
Ethnikos Piraeus	Piraeus	Group 4, 2nd
Giouchtas	Archanes	SL2 South Group, 10th
Haidari	Haidari	Group 4, 9th
Ilisiakos	Athens (Ilisia neighborhood)	Group 4, 5th
Karavas Piraeus	Piraeus (Palaia Kokkinia neighborhood)	Piraeus FCA Champion
Mandraikos	Mandra	West Attica FCA Champion
Marko	Markopoulo	Group 3, 6th
Nea Ionia	Nea Ionia	Athens FCA Group 2 Champion
Rethymniakos	Rethymno	Rethymno FCA Champion
Thiva	Thiva	Boeotia FCA Champion
Thyella Rafina	Rafina (Diastavrosi neighborhood)	Group 3, 3rd
Tympaki	Tympaki	Heraklion FCA Champion

=== Standings ===
Pos	Team	Pld	W	D	L	GF	GA	GD	Pts	Promotion or relegation
1	Marko (C, P)	32	22	8	2	61	22	+39	74	Promotion to Super League 2
2	Ethnikos Piraeus	32	22	7	3	62	20	+42	73	
3	Nea Ionia	32	20	7	5	54	25	+29	67	
4	Haidari	32	15	9	8	36	24	+12	54	
5	Aris Petroupolis	32	15	7	10	39	31	+8	52	
6	Atsalenios	32	14	6	12	43	43	0	48	
7	Ilisiakos	32	14	5	13	50	41	+9	47	
8	Asteras Kaisariani	32	13	8	11	32	24	+8	47	
9	Giouchtas	32	14	5	13	39	40	−1	47	
10	Asteras Vari	32	12	9	11	40	33	+7	45	
11	Thyella Rafina	32	11	11	10	34	32	+2	44	
12	Agios Nikolaos (R)	32	13	5	14	34	36	−2	44	Relegation to Local FCA championships
13	Karavas Piraeus (R)	32	7	6	19	27	58	−31	27	Relegation to Local FCA championships
14	Mandraikos (R)	32	6	8	18	34	51	−17	26	Relegation to Local FCA championships
15	Thiva (R)	32	7	5	20	27	55	−28	26	Relegation to Local FCA championships
16	Tympaki (R)	32	5	6	21	33	60	−27	21	Relegation to Local FCA championships
17	Rethymniakos (R)	32	4	4	24	25	75	−50	16	Relegation to Local FCA championships

Source: Hellenic Football Federation: 2024-25 Match Schedule (Group 4) (in Greek)
Rules for classification: 1) points; 2) head-to-head points; 3) head-to-head goal difference; 4) goal difference; 5) goals scored.
(C) Champions; (P) Promoted; (R) Relegated

=== Results ===
Home \ Away	ANI	APE	ASK	ASV	ATS	ETH	GIO	HAI	ILI	KAR	MAN	MAR	NIO	RET	THI	TRA	TYM
Agios Nikolaos	—	1–2	2–1	1–0	2–0	2–2	1–2	1–0	0–0	1–1	1–0	1–1	1–0	1–2	3–0	1–2	3–0
Aris Petroupolis	1–1	—	1–0	0–0	1–2	0–2	1–1	0–0	2–1	4–0	1–0	1–2	1–2	4–1	2–1	1–0	2–1
Asteras Kaisariani	1–0	0–1	—	2–1	1–0	2–0	0–1	1–2	2–0	3–2	3–0	0–0	1–1	6–0	0–0	0–0	0–3
Asteras Vari	1–0	2–2	1–0	—	0–0	1–1	1–1	1–0	2–1	1–1	3–1	1–1	1–2	7–1	2–0	0–0	2–0
Atsalenios	3–0	3–2	0–1	2–2	—	2–1	1–0	3–4	2–6	3–0	2–1	0–0	0–0	4–0	2–1	3–0	1–4
Ethnikos Piraeus	4–0	2–0	2–0	2–0	1–0	—	3–0	0–0	1–0	2–0	2–1	1–0	3–1	5–0	1–0	1–0	3–0
Giouchtas	1–0	1–0	1–0	4–1	3–0	0–2	—	1–1	1–0	1–1	5–2	2–0	1–2	2–1	2–1	0–0	1–3
Haidari	1–0	0–0	0–0	2–0	2–0	3–0	2–1	—	2–1	1–0	2–0	0–2	2–1	1–0	0–2	3–1	3–1
Ilisiakos	3–1	1–2	1–0	1–0	2–3	0–0	2–1	1–0	—	1–0	3–2	1–2	0–2	3–0	3–3	0–0	4–2
Karavas Piraeus	0–1	1–1	0–0	3–2	2–0	0–3	0–1	1–1	2–1	—	2–1	0–4	0–3	3–2	0–1	0–2	3–0
Mandraikos	0–1	0–1	0–2	1–0	1–1	0–3	2–0	0–0	4–1	3–0	—	1–2	2–4	0–0	1–0	0–0	1–0
Marko	2–1	2–1	4–2	1–0	1–0	2–2	3–0	2–0	2–1	5–0	2–1	—	1–1	4–0	4–1	1–1	3–1
Nea Ionia	2–0	2–0	0–1	1–0	2–0	1–1	3–0	0–0	0–3	2–0	1–0	1–1	—	3–2	6–0	0–0	3–1
Rethymniakos	0–1	0–1	0–1	0–1	0–1	2–5	1–0	2–1	0–3	1–3	3–3	0–1	1–3	—	0–1	2–3	2–3
Thiva	0–3	0–2	1–2	1–2	1–2	1–2	3–2	1–1	2–4	1–0	0–0	1–3	1–2	0–1	—	1–0	1–0
Thyella Rafina	4–2	2–1	0–0	1–2	1–1	0–3	2–1	1–0	1–2	3–1	3–3	0–1	0–1	0–0	2–0	—	2–0
Tympaki	0–1	0–1	0–0	0–3	1–2	2–2	1–2	0–2	0–0	3–1	3–3	0–2	1–2	1–1	1–1	1–3	—

Source: Hellenic Football Federation: 2024-25 Match Schedule (Group 4) (in Greek)
Legend: Blue = home team win; Yellow = draw; Red = away team win.
For upcoming matches, an "a" indicates there is an article about the rivalry between the two participants.
