= Aziz Binous =

Swiss footballer (born 2000)

Personal information
- Full name: Aziz Salah Binous
- Date of birth: 4 August 2000 (age 26)
- Place of birth: Lugano, Switzerland
- Height: 1.92 m (6 ft 4 in)
- Position: Forward

Team information
- Current team: Panakrotiriakos

Youth career
- 2008–2018: Lugano

Senior career*
Years	Team	Apps	(Gls)
2018–2019	Lugano	1	(0)
2018	Lugano II	10	(5)
2019	→ Zürich (loan)	2	(0)
2019–2022	Luzern	5	(1)
2019	Luzern II	4	(2)
2021–2022	→ Kriens (loan)	10	(0)
2022–2023	YF Juventus	12	(1)
2023–2024	AS Castello		
2024	Vogherese	13	(6)
2024–2025	SPAL	0	(0)
2024	→ Chieri (loan)	12	(2)
2025	→ Sant'Angelo (loan)	11	(0)
2025–2026	Folgore Caratese	32	(3)
2026–	Panakrotiriakos	0	(0)

International career^{‡}
2019	Switzerland U20	3	(1)
- * Club domestic league appearances and goals as of 25 June 2026 ‡ National team caps and goals as of 13 October 2019

Aziz Salah Binous (born 4 August 2000) is a Swiss professional footballer who plays as a forward for Greek Gamma Ethniki club Panakrotiriakos.

== Club career ==
On 12 July 2018, Binous signed his first professional contract with his childhood club FC Lugano. Binous made his professional debut in a 2–0 Swiss Super League loss to BSC Young Boys on 29 July 2018.

On 18 January 2019, Binous was loaned out to FC Zürich with an option to buy him permanently. Binous was registered in the U21 squad of the club, however, he got his debut for the first team at the end of March 2019.

On 13 July 2021, he joined Kriens on loan.

On 20 January 2024, Binous joined Italian side Vogherese on a free transfer.

== International career ==
Born in Switzerland, Binous is of Tunisian descent. He represented the Switzerland U20s in 2019, scoring on his debut.
