= Panagiotis Kourdakis =

Greek footballer

Personal information
- Full name: Panagiotis Kourdakis
- Date of birth: 15 August 1988 (age 38)
- Place of birth: Kyani, Evros, Greece
- Height: 1.86 m (6 ft 1 in)
- Position: Centre-back

Youth career
- –2004: AE Didymoteicho
- 2004–2007: PAOK

Senior career*
Years	Team	Apps	(Gls)
2007–2012	PAOK	0	(0)
2008–2009	→ Thermaikos (loan)	28	(1)
2009–2010	→ Pyrsos Grevena (loan)	24	(2)
2010–2012	→ Anagennisi Epanomi (loan)	52	(2)
2012–2014	OFI	24	(0)
2014–2016	Iraklis	10	(0)
2016	AE Didymoteicho		
2017–2021	Maglódi TC		
2021–2023	Kehlen		
- * Club domestic league appearances and goals

Panagiotis Kourdakis (Greek: Παναγιώτης Κουρδάκης; born 15 August 1988) is a Greek former professional footballer who played as a centre-back.

== Career ==
Born in Kyani, Kourdakis began playing football with AE Didymoteichou. In 2004 after a trial he entered the academies of PAOK. He has been loaned to several lower-level Greek clubs and made his debut in Football League 2 with Thermaikos F.C. in September 2008. He has also played for Pyrsos Grevena F.C. and Anagennisi Epanomi F.C. in Football League 2. He signed for OFI in the summer of 2012 after a short trial period with the club. He debuted for OFI in a 2–1 home win against AEK Athens. Totally he appeared in 18 league matches for the club during the 2012–13 season. Kourdakis was sidelined in the 2013–14 season and was forced to train with the club's U-20 squad. On 8 February 2014 he signed a contract with Greek Football League club Iraklis.

== Honours ==
Anagennisi Epanomi

- Football League 2: 2010–11

== Personal life ==
Kourdakis was diagnosed with testicular cancer in 2006. He managed to overcome the disease after a series of surgeries and chemotherapies.
