= Vrettos =

Vrettos is a Greek surname. Notable people with the surname include:

- Christos Vrettos (1894–1973), Greek athlete
- Ioannis Vrettos, Greek long-distance runner
- Nikos Vrettos (born 1995), Greek footballer
- Spyros Vrettos (born 1960), Greek poet
