= Giorgos Koltzos =

Greek footballer

Personal information
- Full name: Georgios Koltzos
- Date of birth: 13 September 1976 (age 50)
- Place of birth: Aridaia, Greece
- Height: 1.75 m (5 ft 9 in)
- Position: Defender

Team information
- Current team: Panakrotiriakos (manager)

Senior career*
Years	Team	Apps	(Gls)
1993–1998	Athinaikos	89	(1)
1998–2002	Paniliakos		
2002–2003	Apollon Kalamarias	25	(0)
2003–2005	Kerkyra		
2005–2006	OFI	11	(0)
2007–2008	Veria	26	(1)
2008–2011	Levadiakos	78	(1)
2011–2012	Thrasyvoulos	7	(0)

Managerial career
- 2019: Panakrotiriakos
- 2020: Platanias U19
- 2020–2021: Platanias
- 2021–2022: Rodos (assistant)
- 2022: Rodos (caretaker)
- 2022–2023: Aris Souda
- 2024: Episkopi
- 2024: Episkopi
- 2024: Rethymniakos
- 2025–2026: Aris Souda
- 2026–: Panakrotiriakos
- * Club domestic league appearances and goals as of 17 July 2010

Giorgos Koltzos (Greek: Γιώργος Κόλτζος; born 13 September 1976) is a Greek former footballer, who played as a defender.

== Career ==
Koltzos began playing football with the youth side of Athinaikos and joined the club's professional team in July 1993. He spent five seasons in the Super League Greece with Athinaikos before moving to Paniliakos in October 1998. He spent three more seasons in the Super League with Paniliakos before the club was relegated to the Beta Ethniki.

Koltzos played for Leeds United as a trialist and played for the reserves against Barnsley in October 2006. He did not get a contract with the club.
