= Giannis Varouxakis =

Greek footballer

Personal information
- Full name: Ioannis Varouxakis
- Date of birth: 9 December 1991 (age 34)
- Place of birth: Chania, Greece
- Height: 1.86 m (6 ft 1 in)
- Position: Forward

Team information
- Current team: AEEK SYN.KA

Youth career
- –2007: Asteras Chalepas
- 2007–2008: Chania
- 2008–2009: OFI

Senior career*
Years	Team	Apps	(Gls)
2009–2010	Panserraikos		
2010–2011	Apollon Kalamarias		
2011–2012	Chania	14	(1)
2012–2013	Kissamikos	5	(1)
2013–2014	Chania		
2014	Kissamikos		
2014	Panakrotiriakos		
2014–2015	Dotieas Agia	4	(0)
2015–2016	Woodford Town		
2016	Weston-super-Mare	8	(2)
2016	Eastbourne Borough	3	(0)
2016	Bishop's Stortford	5	(1)
2016–2017	Cockfosters	24	(23)
2017	Biggleswade United	3	(1)
2018	Asteras Chalepas	1	(2)
2018	Spatha Kolymvariou	17	(12)
2019	Charaviakos	8	(2)
2019–2020	Nafpaktiakos Asteras	9	(2)
2020–	AEEK SYN.KA		
- * Club domestic league appearances and goals as of 20:14, 11 September 2017 (UTC)

Giannis Varouxakis (Greek: Γιάννης Βαρουξάκης; born 9 December 1991) is a Greek footballer who plays for AEEK SYN.KA.

== Career ==
Varouxakis played in the youth teams at Asteras Chalepas, Chania and OFI, and then moved on to Panserraikos and Apollon Kalamarias, before returning to Chania (where he played professionally in Football League 2), followed by stints at Kissamikos, Panakrotiriakos and Dotieas Agia.

In 2015, he moved to England where he joined Woodford Town in the Spartan South Midlands League, before signing for National League South side Weston-super-Mare. He then joined Eastbourne Borough for the 2016–17 season, but played only three games before joining Bishop's Stortford at the end of August 2016. Varouxakis then joined Cockfosters. He joined Biggleswade United for the 2017–18 season. After only three appearances, he returned to Greece and re-joined Asteras Chalepas, before joining Spatha Kolymvariou and then in February 2019 he joined Charaviakos. In the 2019–20 season he played for Nafpaktiakos Asteras and AEEK SYN.KA.

== Personal life ==
Giannis appeared on the TV series 90 Day Fiancé: Single Life, dating Chantel Everett.
