= Alexis Koubroglou =

Greek footballer

Personal information
- Full name: Alexandros Koubroglou
- Date of birth: 14 August 1991 (age 35)
- Place of birth: Drama, Greece
- Height: 1.72 m (5 ft 7 1/2 in)
- Position: Striker

Team information
- Current team: Kavala F.C.

Senior career*
Years	Team	Apps	(Gls)
2009–2012	Doxa Drama	7	(0)
2010–2011	→ Fokikos (loan)	26	(4)
2012–	Kavala F.C.	2	(0)
- * Club domestic league appearances and goals as of 22 January 2012

Alexis Koubroglou (Greek: Αλέξης Κουμπρόγλου; born 14 August 1991) is a professional Greek football player, currently playing for Kavala F.C. in the Greek Football League.

He started his professional career with his current club Doxa Drama in 2009. In summer 2010, he moved on a season-long loan to Fokikos, making 26 appearances and scoring 4 goals in the Football League 2.
