= Androutsos (surname) =

Androutsos (Greek: Ανδρούτσος} is a Greek surname. Notable people with the surname include:

- Odysseas Androutsos (1788-1790 – 1825)
- Thanasis Androutsos

== See also ==
Odysseas Androutsos F.C.
