= Apollon Efpalio F.C. =

Association football club in Greece

Apollon Efpalio
- Full name: Athlitikos Syllogos Apollon Efpalio
- Founded: 1989; 37 years ago
- Ground: Malamata Ground
- Capacity: 900
- Chairman: Thomas Roumpas
- Manager: Alexis Charakidas
- League: Phocis FCA First Division
- 2025–26: Phocis FCA First Division, 2nd
- Website: Official website
Home colours	Away colours

Apollon Efpalio Football Club (Greek: Αθλητικός Σύλλογος Απόλλων Ευπαλίου) is a Greek football club based in Efpalio, Phocis. The official foundation year of the club is 1989, and its official colors are blue and white.

== History ==
Apollon Efpalio was founded in 1989 and has since competed continuously in the championships of the Phocis Football Clubs Association. Its team colors are blue and white, and its emblem features a platanus tree leaf.

During the 2008–09 season, under head coach Lakis Loukopoulos, the club won the Phocis FCA championship and reached the cup final, where it was defeated 2–0 by Asteras Itea. In the following 2009–10 football season, managed by head coach Stavros Stavrou with technical advisor Professor Menios Sotiropoulos, the club competed in the Delta Ethniki as part of the 5th Group. However, the lack of a home ground forced the team to use various stadiums across Aetolia-Acarnania and Preveza as its home venues. Despite these conditions and playing what was widely regarded as good football—featuring the group's top scorer, Christos Fleggas—the team failed to avoid relegation. In the same year, it won the Phocis FCA Cup, defeating Krisaios Chrisso 2–0 in the final.

During the 2014–15 season, Apollon won the second championship in its history and participated in the FCA champions' play-off matches for promotion to the Gamma Ethniki.

The club was also crowned champion in the 2018–19 season, earning promotion to the Gamma Ethniki, while finishing as the runner-up in the Phocis FCA Cup during the same year.

Apollon was crowned Phocis FCA champion for three consecutive seasons (2021–22, 2022–23, 2023–24), while also winning the local cup during the second season.

During the 2023–24 season, the club participated in the FCA champions' play-off matches for promotion to the Gamma Ethniki for the second time in its history and successfully secured promotion, achieving the greatest distinction in its history. In its debut appearance in Gamma Ethniki during the 2024–25 season, Apollon Efpalio finished in 13th place and was relegated.

In the 2025–26 season, Apollon won its 5th consecutive Phocis FCA Cup, defeating Odysseas Androutsos Gravia 1–0 in the final held in Amfissa.

== Honours ==
=== Regional ===
- Phocis FCA First Division
  - Winners (6): 2008–09, 2014–15, 2018–19, 2021–22, 2022–23, 2023–24
- Phocis FCA Cup
  - Winners (6): 2009–10, 2021–22, 2022–23, 2023–24, 2024–25, 2025–26
