= Phocis Football Clubs Association =

Association football governing body in Phocis Prefecture, Greece

- Full name: Phocis Football Clubs Association; Greek: Ένωση Ποδοσφαιρικών Σωματείων Φωκίδας
- Short name: Phocis F.C.A.; Greek: Ε.Π.Σ. Φωκίδας
- Founded: 1984; 42 years ago
- Headquarters: Amfissa, Greece
- FIFA affiliation: Hellenic Football Federation
- President: Efstathios Karagounis

Phocis Football Clubs Association (Greek: Ένωση Ποδοσφαιρικών Σωματείων Φωκίδας) is one of the newest Greek amateur association football governing bodies, representing teams from Phocis Prefecture. The association was founded in 1984 after breaking up from the old Phocis-Phthiotida Football Clubs Association. Its offices are housed in Amfissa and it is a member of Hellenic Football Federation.

== Organization ==
The association organizes a regional football league and cup.

== League ==
=== Championship ===
- 1986: Asteras Itea
- 1987: Isaias Desfina
- 1988: Fokikos
- 1989: Asteras Itea
- 1990: Fokikos
- 1991: Isaias Desfina
- 1992: Diagoras Polydrosos
- 1993: Asteras Itea
- 1994: Diagoras Polydrosos
- 1995: Asteras Itea
- 1996: Diagoras Polydrosos
- 1997: Asteras Itea
- 1998: Fokikos
- 1999: Dorikos Nea Dorida
- 2000: Asteras Itea
- 2001: Fokikos
- 2002: Fokikos
- 2003: Asteras Itea
- 2004: Androutsos Gravia
- 2005: Asteras Itea
- 2006: Fokikos
- 2007: Asteras Itea
- 2008: A.O. Kehagias
- 2009: Apollon Efpalio
- 2010: Dorikos Nea Dorida
- 2011: Diagoras Polydrosos
- 2012: Androutsos Gravia
- 2013: Asteras Itea
- 2014: Asteras Itea
- 2015: Apollon Efpalio
- 2016: Asteras Itea
- 2017: Asteras Itea
- 2018: Fokikos
- 2019: Apollon Efpalio
- 2020: Fokikos
- 2021: Cancelled
- 2022: Apollon Efpalio
- 2023: Apollon Efpalio
- 2024: Apollon Efpalio
- 2025: Isaias Desfina
- 2026: Fokikos

=== Performance by club ===
Club	Titles	Season
Asteras Itea	12	1986, 1989, 1993, 1995, 1997, 2000, 2003, 2005, 2007, 2013, 2014, 2016, 2017
Fokikos	9	1988, 1990, 1998, 2001, 2002, 2006, 2018, 2020, 2026
Apollon Efpalio	6	2009, 2015, 2019, 2022, 2023, 2024
Diagoras Polydrosos	4	1992, 1994, 1996, 2011
Isaias Desfina	3	1987, 1991, 2025
Dorikos Nea Dorida	2	1999, 2010
Androutsos Gravia	2	2004, 2012
A.O. Kehagias	1	2008

== Cup ==
=== Cup Winners ===
- 1986: Asteras Itea
- 1987: Fokikos
- 1988: Asteras Itea
- 1989: Fokikos
- 1990: Fokikos
- 1991: Isaias Desfina
- 1992: Fokikos
- 1993: Asteras Itea
- 1994: Fokikos
- 1995: Fokikos
- 1996: Asteras Itea
- 1997: Asteras Itea
- 1998: Asteras Itea
- 1999: Asteras Itea
- 2000: Fokikos
- 2001: Fokikos
- 2002: Asteras Itea
- 2003: Fokikos
- 2004: Fokikos
- 2005: Androutsos Gravia
- 2006: Androutsos Gravia
- 2007: Fokikos
- 2008: Asteras Itea
- 2009: Asteras Itea
- 2010: Apollon Efpalio
- 2011: A.C. Tolofona/Eratini
- 2012: Amfissaikos 2006
- 2013: Androutsos Gravia
- 2014: Asteras Itea
- 2015: Dorians Managouli
- 2016: Krissaios Chrissou
- 2017: Fokikos
- 2018: Asteras Itea
- 2019: Asteras Itea
- 2020: Amfissaikos 2006
- 2021: Cancelled
- 2022: Apollon Efpalio
- 2023: Apollon Efpalio
- 2024: Apollon Efpalio
- 2025: Apollon Efpalio
- 2026: Apollon Efpalio

=== Performance by club ===
Club	Titles	Season
Asteras Itea	13	1986, 1988, 1993, 1996, 1997, 1998, 1999, 2002, 2008, 2009, 2014, 2018, 2019
Fokikos	11	1987, 1989, 1990, 1992, 1994, 1995, 2000, 2001, 2003, 2004, 2007, 2017
Apollon Efpalio	6	2010, 2022, 2023, 2024, 2025, 2026
Androutsos Gravia	3	2005, 2006, 2013
Amfissaikos 2006	2	2012, 2020
Isaias Desfina	1	1991
A.C. Tolofona/Eratini	1	2011
Dorians Managouli	1	2015
Krissaios Chrissou	1	2016

=== Super Cup ===
- 2012: Androutsos Gravia
- 2018: Fokikos
