= Moudania F.C. =

Greek football club

Moudania
- Full name: Panathlitikos Omilos Moudania
- Short name: POM
- Founded: 1928; 98 years ago
- Ground: Nea Moudania Municipal Stadium
- Chairman: Athanasios Panagiotopoulos
- Manager: Leonidas Zotakis
- League: Chalkidiki FCA
- 2025–26: Chalkidiki FCA First Division, 10th (relegated)

Old crest

Panathlitikos Omilos Moudania (Greek: Παναθλητικός Όμιλος Μουδανιών) is a Greek football club, based in Nea Moudania, Chalkidiki.

== History ==
The club was founded in 1928. P.O. Moudania is the largest and most historical club in the Chalkidiki Prefecture, based on the total number of titles it has won, which is 21.

It has won the Chalkidiki FCA championship 16 times, ranking first on the relevant list, and also holds five Chalkidiki FCA Cups.

The first attempts to achieve promotion to the national divisions were made in 1970 and 1971, when, as Chalkidiki FCA champion, the club participated in the special amateur promotion tournament without managing to win promotion to Beta Ethniki. In its third attempt in 1972, it won first place in its group undefeated and secured promotion to Beta Ethniki, where it remained for 3 seasons.

In the 1974–75 season, the club was relegated to the regional championships due to the impending reduction of Beta Ethniki teams starting from the 1975–76 season. This was followed by 2 Chalkidiki FCA championships and 2 unsuccessful attempts in the special amateur promotion tournament to return to Beta Ethniki. However, it secured a spot for the inaugural season of Gamma Ethniki in 1977–78. It was relegated immediately and returned for a single season (1979–80).

During the 1980s, the club alternated between the Chalkidiki FCA and Delta Ethniki, participating in the latter during the 1982–83, 1983–84, and 1985–86 seasons. Moudania returned to national championships in the 1994–95 season and remained in Delta Ethniki for four consecutive seasons.

In the 2008–09 season, Moudania returned to Delta Ethniki, where it remained until the 2010–11 season. In 2013, through the 2013 Champions' FCA Special Tournament, it secured participation in the 2013–14 Gamma Ethniki, but was relegated immediately and in 2015 failed to return through the special promotion tournament.

In 2024, the club secured participation in Gamma Ethniki after 10 years via the 2024 Champions' FCA Special Tournament, filling a vacancy created in the higher division. The 2024–25 season was disastrous for the club. In the 16 matchdays in which it fielded a team, it suffered 15 defeats, some of them by massive scorelines. Ultimately, following a 10–0 defeat against Poseidon Nea Michaniona on matchday 16, the team withdrew from the championship.

== Honours ==
=== Regional ===
- Chalkidiki FCA Championship
  - Winners (16): 1953–54, 1967–68, 1969–70, 1970–71, 1971–72, 1975–76, 1976–77, 1978–79, 1981–82, 1984–85, 1986–87, 1993–94, 2007–08, 2012–13, 2014–15, 2023–24
- Chalkidiki FCA Cup
  - Winners (5): 1971–72, 1976–77, 1980–81, 1985–86, 1995–96

== League participation ==
- Beta Ethniki (3): 1972–73, 1973–74, 1974–75
- Gamma Ethniki (4): 1977–78, 1979–80, 2013–14, 2024–25
- Delta Ethniki (10): 1982–83, 1983–84, 1985–86, 1994–95, 1995–96, 1996–97, 1997–98, 2008–09, 2009–10, 2010–11
