= Evros Football Clubs Association =

Association football governing body in Evros Prefecture, Greece

- Full name: Evros Football Clubs Association; Greek: Ένωση Ποδοσφαιρικών Σωματείων Έβρου
- Short name: Evros F.C.A.; Greek: Ε.Π.Σ. Έβρου
- Founded: 1969; 57 years ago
- Headquarters: Alexandroupolis, Greece
- FIFA affiliation: Hellenic Football Federation
- President: Pantelis Chatzimarinakis
- Website: eps-evrou.gr

Evros Football Clubs Association (Greek: Ένωση Ποδοσφαιρικών Σωματείων Έβρου) is the organization that is responsible for association football in Evros Prefecture. Its offices are housed in Alexandroupolis and it is a member of the Hellenic Football Federation. It is responsible for running the local league and cup, as well as the youth and children's leagues. It also coordinates the activities of the mixed youth and children's divisions, which represent the county at national level.

== History ==
Evros Football Clubs Association was founded in 1969, after the separation of the clubs of Evros from Thrace Football Clubs Association.

== Organization ==
The structure of the leagues of the E.P.S. Evros for the 2024–25 season were as follows:

- First Division: 5 Teams
- Second Division: 24 Teams
  - Group A: 13 Teams
  - Group B: 11 Teams

== League ==
=== Champions ===
Season	Winner
1969–70	A.E. Didymoteicho
1970–71	Orestis Orestiada
1971–72	G.S. Alexandroupoli
1972–73	Ethnikos Alexandroupoli
1973–74	A.E. Didymoteicho
1974–75	Ethnikos Alexandroupoli
1975–76	Ethnikos Alexandroupoli
1976–77	Ethnikos Alexandroupoli
1977–78	G.S. Alexandroupoli
1978–79	Orestis Orestiada
1979–80	G.S. Alexandroupoli
1980–81	Orestis Orestiada
1981–82	M.G.S. Akritas Nea Vyssa
1982–83	A.M.S. Iraklis Sagini
1983–84	M.G.S. Aspida Kavyli
1984–85	Thraki Feres
1985–86	Orestis Orestiada
1986–87	A.S. Evros Soufli
1987–88	Orestis Orestiada
1988–89	A.O. Aris Aisymi
1989–90	A.E. Didymoteicho
1990–91	A.S. Evros Soufli
1991–92	Thraki Feres
1992–93	M.G.S. Akritas Nea Vyssa
1993–94	A.S. Peplos
1994–95	M.G.S. Akritas Nea Vyssa
1995–96	Thraki Feres
1996–97	A.O. Samothraki
1997–98	M.G.S. Akritas Nea Vyssa
1998–99	Thraki Feres
1999–2000	M.G.S. Akritas Nea Vyssa
2000–01	A.O. Samothraki
2001–02	A.E. Didymoteicho
2002–03	A.O. Kappadokon
2003–04	Orestis Orestiada
2004–05	Ethnikos Alexandroupoli
2005–06	A.S. Evros Soufli
2006–07	A.E. Nea Chili
2007–08	Orestis Orestiada
2008–09	A.S. Evros Soufli
2009–10	Ethnikos Alexandroupoli
2010–11	A.E. Nea Chili
2011–12	Enosi Anthia Aristino
2012–13	Orestis Orestiada
2013–14	Ethnikos Alexandroupoli
2014–15	A.E. Didymoteicho
2015–16	A.E. Didymoteicho
2016–17	A.E. Didymoteicho
2017–18	Ethnikos Alexandroupoli
2018–19	Orestis Orestiada
2019–20	A.E. Didymoteicho
2020–21	Suspended
2021–22	Ipokratis Alexandroupoli
2022–23	Orestis Orestiada
2023–24	Alexandroupoli
2024–25	Ethnikos Alexandroupoli
2025–26	Ardas Kastaneon

=== Winners by club ===
Club	Winner	Seasons
Orestis Orestiada	10	1971, 1979, 1981, 1986, 1988, 2004, 2008, 2013, 2019, 2023
Ethnikos Alexandroupoli	9	1973, 1975, 1976, 1977, 2005, 2010, 2014, 2018, 2025
A.E. Didymoteicho	8	1970, 1974, 1990, 2002, 2015, 2016, 2017, 2020
M.G.S. Akritas Nea Vyssa	5	1982, 1993, 1995, 1998, 2000
Thraki Feres	4	1985, 1992, 1996, 1999
A.S. Evros Soufli	4	1987, 1991, 2006, 2009
G.S. Alexandroupoli	3	1972, 1978, 1980
A.E. Nea Chili	2	2007, 2011
A.O. Samothraki	2	1997, 2001
A.M.S. Iraklis Sagini	1	1983
M.G.S. Aspida Kavyli	1	1984
A.O. Aris Aisymi	1	1989
A.S. Peplos	1	1994
A.O. Kappadokon	1	2003
Enosi Anthia Aristino	1	2012
Ipokratis Alexandroupoli	1	2022
Alexandroupoli	1	2024
Ardas Kastaneon	1	2026

== Cup ==
=== Cup winners ===
Season	Winner
1971–72	G.S. Alexandroupoli
1972–73	Ethnikos Alexandroupoli
1973–74	A.E. Didymoteicho
1974–75	Ethnikos Alexandroupoli
1975–76	
1976–77	A.E. Didymoteicho
1977–78	Orestis Orestiada
1978–79	Orestis Orestiada
1979–80	A.E. Didymoteicho
1980–81	Ethnikos Alexandroupoli
1981–82	Orestis Orestiada
1982–83	Orestis Orestiada
1983–84	Ethnikos Loutro
1984–85	A.M.S. Iraklis Sagini
1985–86	PAE Pentalofos
1986–87	Orestis Orestiada
1987–88	A.O. Aris Aisymi
1988–89	Orestis Orestiada
1989–90	Orestis Orestiada
1990–91	Orestis Orestiada
1991–92	A.S. Doxa Tychero
1992–93	A.O. Alexandroupoli
1993–94	Orestis Orestiada
1994–95	Ethnikos Alexandroupoli
1995–96	A.O. Samothraki
1996–97	M.G.S. Akritas Nea Vyssa
1997–98	M.G.S. Akritas Nea Vyssa
1998–99	Orestis Orestiada
1999–2000	M.G.S. Akritas Nea Vyssa
2000–01	Enosi Thraki
2001–02	Enosi Thraki
2002–03	Enosi Thraki
2003–04	Orestis Orestiada
2004–05	A.M.S. Aetos Lepti
2005–06	Ethnikos Alexandroupoli
2006–07	A.E. Nea Chili
2007–08	A.O. Kappadokon
2008–09	A.S. Evros Soufli
2009–10	A.S. Evros Soufli
2010–11	A.S. Evros Soufli
2011–12	A.S. Evros Soufli
2012–13	A.S. Evros Soufli
2013–14	Ethnikos Alexandroupoli
2014–15	A.O. Ethnikos Neochori
2015–16	A.S. Evros Soufli
2016–17	A.E. Didymoteicho
2017–18	Thraki Feres
2018–19	Ethnikos Alexandroupoli
2019–20	A.E. Didymoteicho
2020–21	Suspended due to the COVID-19 pandemic
2021–22	Alexandroupoli
2022–23	Alexandroupoli
2023–24	Orestis Orestiada
2024–25	Alexandroupoli
2025–26	Orestis Orestiada

=== Winners by club ===
Club	Winner	Seasons
Orestis Orestiada	13	1978, 1979, 1982, 1983, 1987, 1989, 1990, 1991, 1994, 1999, 2004, 2024, 2026
A.S. Evros Soufli	6	2009, 2010, 2011, 2012, 2013, 2016
Ethnikos Alexandroupoli	5	1981, 1995, 2006, 2014, 2019
A.E. Didymoteicho	3	1980, 2017, 2020
Enosi Thraki	3	2001, 2002, 2003
M.G.S. Akritas Nea Vyssa	3	1997, 1998, 2000
Alexandroupoli	3	2022, 2023, 2025
Ethnikos Loutro	1	1984
A.M.S. Iraklis Sagini	1	1985
PAE Pentalofos	1	1986
A.O. Aris Aisymi	1	1988
A.O. Doxa Tychero	1	1992
A.O. Alexandroupoli	1	1993
A.O. Samothraki	1	1996
A.M.S. Aetos Lepti	1	2005
A.E. Nea Chili	1	2007
A.O. Kappadokon	1	2008
A.O. Ethnikos Neochori	1	2015
Thraki Feres	1	2018

=== Finals ===
Seasons	Winner	Score	Runner-up
1971–72	G.S. Alexandroupoli		
1972–73	Ethnikos Alexandroupoli		
1973–74	A.E. Didymoteicho		
1974–75	Ethnikos Alexandroupoli		
1975–76			
1976–77	A.E. Didymoteicho		
1977–78	Orestis Orestiada		
1978–79	Orestis Orestiada	1–0	A.O. Alexandroupoli
1979–80	A.E. Didymoteicho	2–1	Orestis Orestiada
1980–81	Ethnikos Alexandroupoli	2–0	A.S. Evros Soufli
1981–82	Orestis Orestiada	4–3	A.S. Evros Soufli
1982–83	Orestis Orestiada	0–0 (a.e.t.) (5–4 p)	Thraki Feres
1983–84	Ethnikos Loutro	3–1	Iraklis Amorio
1984–85	A.M.S. Iraklis Sagini	2–0	Thraki Feres
1985–86	PAE Pentalofos	1–0	A.O. Alexandroupoli
1986–87	Orestis Orestiada	1–0	A.O. Alexandroupoli
1987–88	A.O. Aris Aisymi	1–0	Orestis Orestiada
1988–89	Orestis Orestiada	1–0	Ethnikos Loutro
1989–90	Orestis Orestiada	0–0 (a.e.t.) (5–4 p)	A.O. Alexandroupoli
1990–91	Orestis Orestiada	2–0	A.S. Evros Soufli
1991–92	A.S. Doxa Tychero	2–1	Orestis Orestiada
1992–93	A.O. Alexandroupoli	1–0	Orestis Orestiada
1993–94	Orestis Orestiada	5–0	A.O. Alexandroupoli
1994–95	Ethnikos Alexandroupoli	1–0	M.G.S. Akritas Nea Vyssa
1995–96	A.O. Samothraki	2–1	A.E. Didymoteicho
1996–97	M.G.S. Akritas Nea Vyssa	2–1	Orfeas Alexandroupoli
1997–98	M.G.S. Akritas Nea Vyssa	2–1	A.O. Samothraki
1998–99	Orestis Orestiada	2–1	Orfeas Alexandroupoli
1999–2000	M.G.S. Akritas Nea Vyssa	1–0	Enosi Thraki
2000–01	Enosi Thraki	2–1	M.G.S. Akritas Nea Vyssa
2001–02	Enosi Thraki	5–1	M.G.S. Akritas Nea Vyssa
2002–03	Enosi Thraki	4–0	M.G.S. Akritas Nea Vyssa
2003–04	Orestis Orestiada	3–1 (a.e.t.)	Ethnikos Alexandroupoli
2004–05	A.M.S. Aetos Lepti	(5–4 p)	A.S. Evros Soufli
2005–06	Ethnikos Alexandroupoli	2–1	A.M.S. Aeros Lepti
2006–07	A.E. Nea Chili	2–1	Orestis Orestiada
2007–08	A.O. Kappadokon	2–0	A.M.S. Aetos Lepti
2008–09	A.S. Evros Soufli	1–0	Orestis Orestiada
2009–10	A.S. Evros Soufli	3–0	Orestis Orestiada
2010–11	A.S. Evros Soufli	1–0	Orestis Orestiada
2011–12	A.S. Evros Soufli	2–1	Anagennisi Metaxa
2012–13	A.S. Evros Soufli	3–0	PAE Rizia
2013–14	Ethnikos Alexandroupoli	1–0	Orestis Orestiada
2014–15	Ethnikos Neochori	1–0	Enosi Anthia Aristino
2015–16	A.S. Evros Soufli	3–2	Enosi Anthia Aristino
2016–17	A.E. Didymoteicho	1–0	Enosi Anthia Aristino
2017–18	Thraki Feres	1–0 (a.e.t.)	Orestis Orestiada
2018–19	Ethnikos Alexandroupoli	3–0	A.S. Evros Soufli
2019–20	A.E. Didymoteicho	Draw^{1}	Alexandroupoli
2020–21	Suspended		
2021–22	Alexandroupoli	2–1	Orestis Orestiada
2022–23	Alexandroupoli	4–4 (a.e.t.) (4–3 p)	Orestis Orestiada
2023–24	Orestis Orestiada	4–1	Ethnikos Alexandroupoli

^{1} In the 2019–20 season, the cup was suspended due to the coronavirus pandemic. Through draw lots among the remaining groups, the finalists and the winning team, A.E. Didymoteicho were drawn who participated in the Greek Cup the following season.

^{2} In the 2020–21 season, the organization of the cup, as well as the local leagues, was interrupted due to a new outbreak of the coronavirus pandemic. Then it was decided to definitively cancel them.

Source:ΟΙ 43 ΤΕΛΙΚΟΙ ΤΟΥ ΚΥΠΕΛΛΟΥ ΕΠΣ ΕΒΡΟΥ (1978-2018)
