= Ethnikos Alexandroupoli F.C. =

Ethnikos Alexandroupoli
- Full name: Mousikos Gymnastikos Syllogos Ethnikos Alexandroupolis (Music and Gymnastics Club Ethnikos Alexandroupolis)
- Nickname: Ethnikos
- Founded: 1927; 1973 (refounded); 1999 (refounded)
- Ground: Fotis Kosmas Stadium
- Capacity: 5,000
- Chairman: Avgerinos Mesinezis
- Manager: Stavros Stathakis
- League: Evros FCA First Division
- 2025–26: Evros FCA First Division, 5th
- Website: http://www.ethnikos-mgs.gr
Home colours	Away colours

Ethnikos Alexandroupoli F.C. (Greek: Εθνικός Αλεξανδρούπολης) is an association football club based in Alexandroupoli, a city in the Evros prefecture of northern Greece. It was established in 1927.

== History ==
Ethnikos participated 7 times in the Beta Ethniki between 1963 and 1974, 8 times in the Gamma Ethniki between 1983 and 1994 and in the 1972 Greek Amateur Cup final as G.S. Alexandroupoli, where it lost against Fivos Kremasti at Karaiskaki Stadium.

In 1969, due to a law by the regime of the Colonels which ruled Greece at the time, Ethnikos was merged with Doxa Alexandroupoli to form G.S. Alexandroupoli. In 1973, Ethnikos re-established its football department and in 1995 it was merged with A.O. Alexandroupoli, a club formed by G.S. Alexandroupoli and Kyklopas Makris, to form Orfeas Alexandroupoli, which in 1999 it was renamed Enosi Thraki. In the same year, Ethnikos Alexandroupoli was re-established at the local Evros championships, where it currently plays.

== Honours ==
=== Domestic ===
- Third Division
  - Winners (1): 1965–66
- Fourth Division
  - Winners (1): 1991–92

=== Regional ===
- Evros FCA Championship
  - Winners (9): 1972–73, 1974–75, 1975–76, 1976–77, 2004–05, 2009–10, 2013–14, 2017–18, 2024–25
- Evros FCA Cup
  - Winners (7): 1972–73, 1974–75, 1980–81, 1994–95, 2005–06, 2013–14, 2018–19

== See also ==
- Ethnikos Alexandroupoli V.C.
