= PAO Varda F.C. =

Association football club in Greece

PAO Varda
- Full name: Pamvouprasiakos Athlitikos Omilos Varda
- Founded: 10 August 1948; 78 years ago
- Ground: Grigorios Kalakos Stadium
- Capacity: 700
- Chairman: Artemios Verras
- Manager: Charalampos Rantos
- League: Elis FCA First Division
- 2025–26: Elis FCA First Division, 3rd
- Website: Official website
Home colours	Away colours

Pamvouprasiakos Athlitikos Omilos Varda (Greek: Παμβουπρασιακός Α.Ο. Βάρδας), commonly known as PAO Varda, is a Greek football club founded in 1948 in Varda, Elis. The team colors are green and white.

== History ==
Founded in 1948, the initial mame of the team was Asteras Varda and the colors were crimson, black and white. The name was changed to Pamvouprasiakos Athlitikos Omilos Varda PAO Varda on 11 January 1958. The name "Pamvouprasiakos" was chosen because when the club was founded, there was no other team in the broader region, and its purpose was to become the team for the entire area of Vouprasia. The name Vouprasia was given to the region due to the main occupation of its inhabitants, which was cattle breeding and trading (from the Ancient Greek bous (ox) and pipraskein (to sell)), which is why the team's emblem features a bull to symbolize it.

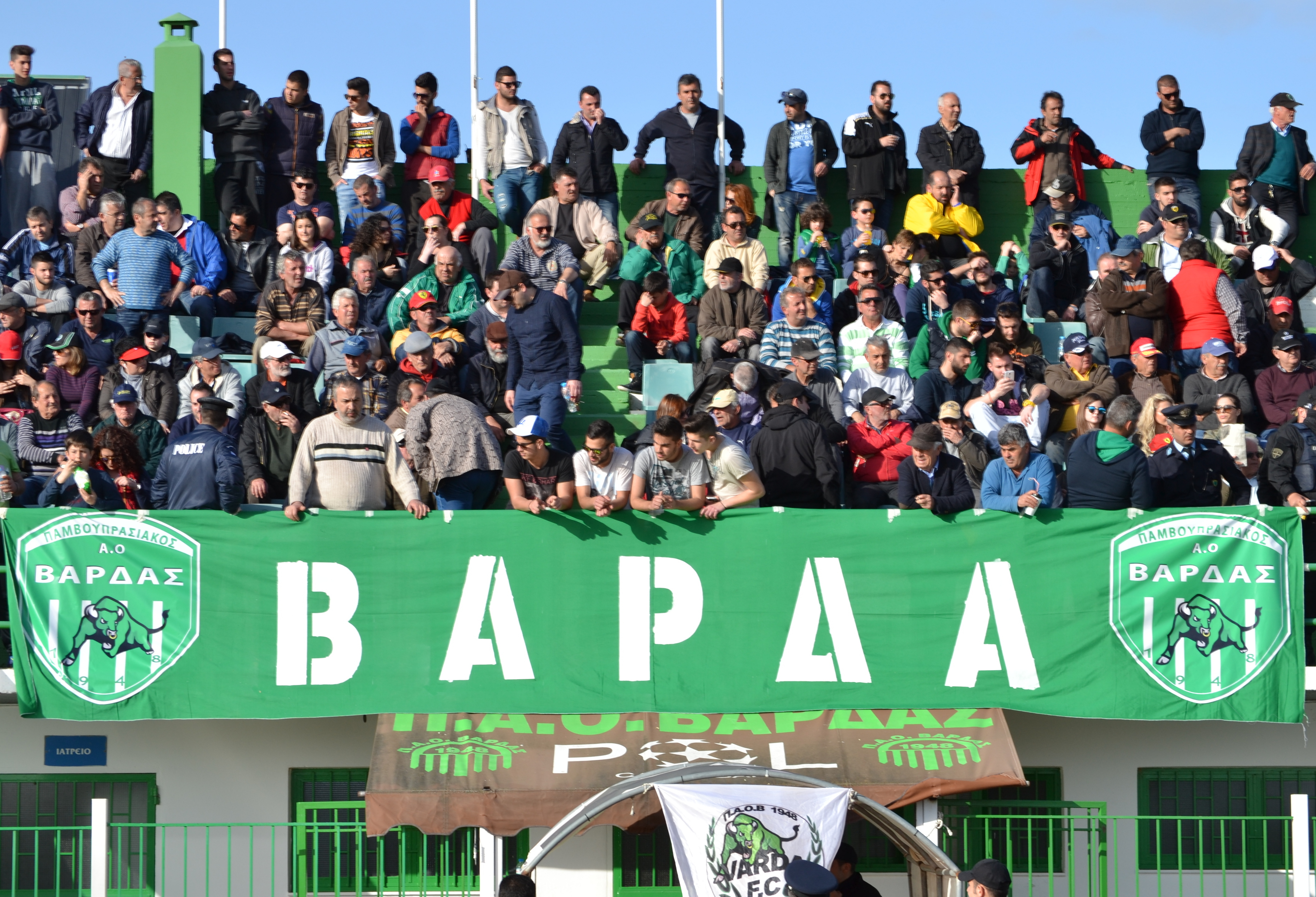
Supporters during a match

PAO Vardas for the first time in its history became Champion of Elis in 1991–92 and won promotion to Delta Ethniki. PAO Varda played in Delta Ethniki for the 2003–04 and 2004–05 seasons, and won promotion to Gamma Ethniki, but the following year was relegated and played the 2007–08 season in Delta Ethniki. During 2008–09, after fruitless efforts to find a solution to the administrative problem of the group, it was announced that it will not participate in the league.

From 2013 to 2022, the team participated in Gamma Ethniki.

In the 2021–22 season, PAO Varda won the Elis FCA Cup for the first time in its history (technically, the first cup title won by the club was during the 2019–20 season; however, the competition was suspended due to the COVID-19 pandemic, resulting in the club being crowned cup winner through a draw), defeating Aias Gastouni 3–1 in extra time following a 1–1 draw in regular time. During the 2023–24 Greek Football Cup, PAO Varda reached the 4th round by eliminating APS Patras, Pangytheatikos, and Panargiakos along the way, before ultimately being knocked out by Niki Volos.

== Stadium ==
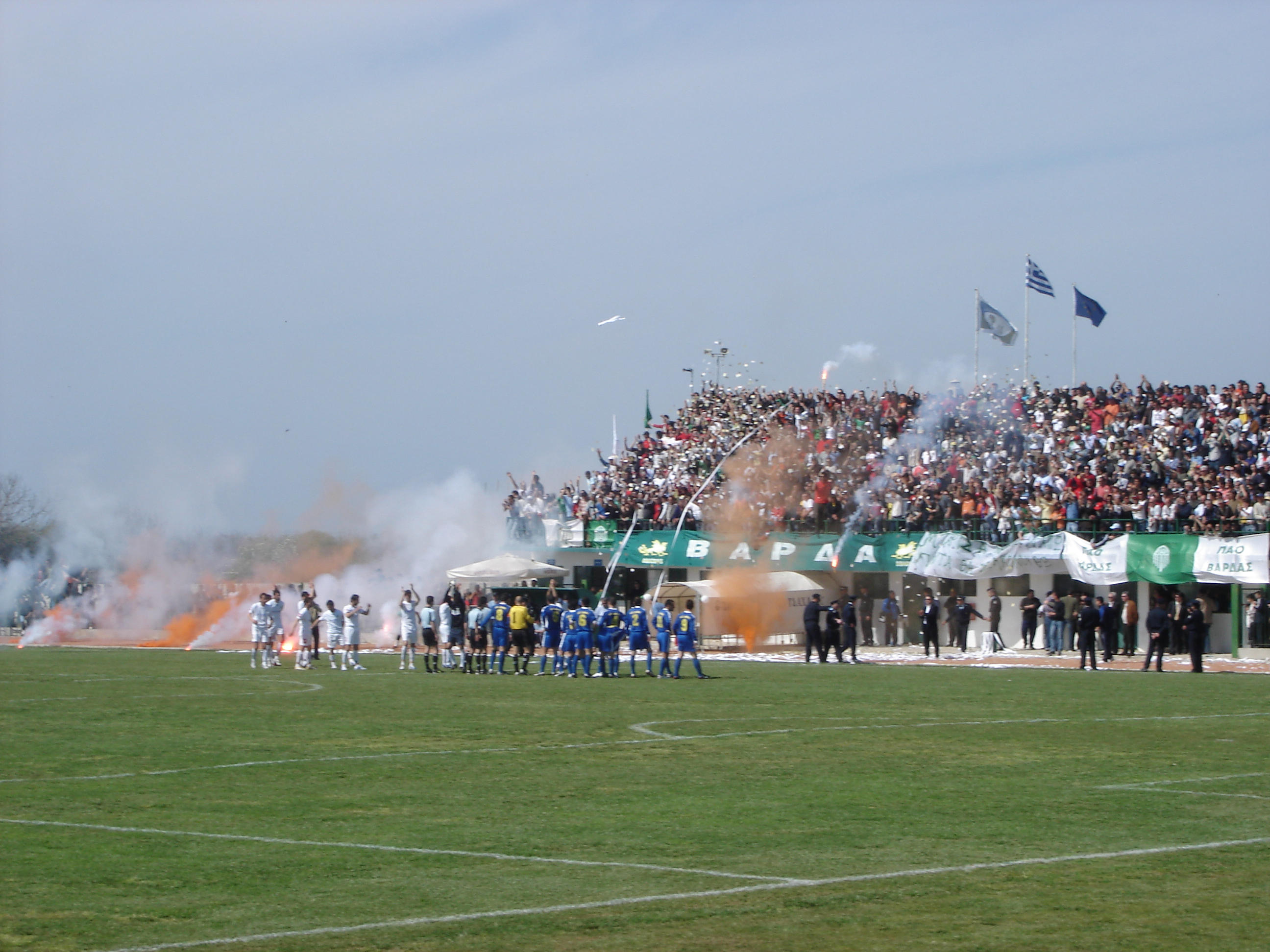
Grigorios Kalakos Stadium during a match

The club's home ground is the "Grigoris Kalakos" Municipal Stadium of Varda, where it has played since 1979, located to the west of the settlement.

== Honours ==
=== Domestic ===
- Elis FCA First Division
  - Winners (4): 1991–92, 2002–03, 2012–13, 2022–23
- Elis FCA Cup
  - Winners (4): 2019–20, 2021–22, 2022–23, 2023–24
- Elis FCA Super Cup
  - Winners (1): 2013
