= Nikos Vrettos =

Greek footballer

Personal information
- Full name: Nikolaos Vrettos
- Date of birth: 24 October 1995 (age 31)
- Place of birth: Heraklion, Crete, Greece
- Height: 1.71 m (5 ft 7 in)
- Position: Forward

Team information
- Current team: Panakrotiriakos

Youth career
- Atsalenios

Senior career*
| Years | Team | Apps | (Gls) |
| 2016–2018 | OFI | 5 | (0) |
| 2017–2018 | → Chania (loan) | 22 | (1) |
| 2018–2021 | Chania | 49 | (5) |
| 2021–2023 | Irodotos | 39 | (0) |
| 2023–2024 | Giouchtas | 27 | (0) |
| 2024–2026 | Atsalenios | | |
| 2026– | Panakrotiriakos | | |
- * Club domestic league appearances and goals as of 22 May 2024

Nikos Vrettos (Greek: Νίκος Βρεττός; born 24 October 1995) is a Greek professional footballer who plays as a forward for Gamma Ethniki club Panakrotiriakos.
