= Asteras Itea F.C. =

Greek association football club

Asteras Itea
- Full name: Asteras Iteas Football Club
- Nickname: The Tricoloured (gr. "Οι Τρικολόρ")
- Founded: 1930; 96 years ago
- Stadium: Itea Municipal Ground «Athanasios Nikokyrakis»
- Chairman: Giannis Chlempogiannis
- Manager: Panagiotis Karachristos
- League: Phocis FCA First Division
- 2025–26: Phocis FCA First Division, 8th
Home colours	Away colours

Asteras Itea Football Club (Greek: Α.Σ. Αστέρας Ιτέας) is a Greek football club based in Itea, Phocis, Greece.

== Honours ==
=== Domestic ===
  - Phocis FCA Champions: 13
    - 1985–86, 1988–89, 1992–93, 1994–95, 1996–97, 1999–2000, 2002–03, 2004–05, 2006–07, 2012–13, 2013–14, 2015–16, 2016–17
  - Phocis FCA Cup Winners: 13
    - 1985–86, 1987–88, 1992–93, 1995–96, 1996–97, 1997–98, 1998–99, 2001–02, 2007–08, 2008–09, 2013–14, 2017–18, 2018–19
