= Orestis Orestiada F.C. =

Association football club in Greece

Orestis Orestiada
- Full name: Mousikos Gymnastikos Syllogos Orestis
- Founded: 1927; 99 years ago
- Ground: Orestiada Municipal Stadium
- Chairman: Panagiotis Vangeloudis
- Manager: Panagiotis Mylonas
- League: Evros FCA First Division
- 2025–26: Gamma Ethniki (Group 1), 12th (relegated)
Home colours	Away colours

Mousikos Gymnastikos Syllogos Orestis (Greek: Μουσικός Γυμναστικός Σύλλογος Ορέστης), known simply as Orestis Orestiada, is a football club based in Orestiada, Evros, Greece.

== History ==
M.G.S. Orestis Orestiada was founded in 1927 following the merger of two local clubs, Atlas Orestiada and Ermis Orestiada. It was officially recognized by the HFF in June 1955, receiving registration number 527, and joined the newly recognized Evros–Rodopi FCA. The new association dissolved three months later, leading to the re-establishment of the Thrace Football Clubs Association. Orestis Orestiada remained part of Thrace FCA until 1969, the year the Evros FCA was founded, with the club being one of its founding members.

Its first appearance in the national divisions came in 1966, after winning the Thrace FCA championship and participating in the 1966–67 Gamma Ethniki, where it missed first place and promotion to the Beta Ethniki by just one point (ultimately finishing 4th). The following year, the Gamma Ethniki was abolished, and from 1968 to 1971, Orestis featured prominently in the local leagues, competing in the amateur promotion play-offs for entry into the Beta Ethniki. The club succeeded on two occasions, making its first—and to date only—appearances in the second tier during the 1969–70 and 1971–72 seasons. Notably, on 9 June 1972, the team traveled to Edirne and played an international friendly match against local Turkish club Edirnespor, securing a 1–0 victory.

Throughout the remainder of the 1970s, Orestis Orestiada competed in local leagues until the 1978–79 season, when it won both the Evros FCA League and Cup double. This earned the club a return to national divisions for the 1979–80 season, competing in the National Amateur Division as it was then named.

In 1993–94, following six consecutive seasons in the Delta Ethniki, the club won its group title and secured promotion to the 1994–95 Gamma Ethniki, where it remained for four seasons. In 1998, it was relegated back to the Delta Ethniki, and in 2000, it returned to the Evros FCA regional championship after 12 years.

In the new millennium, Orestis Orestiada continued to play a leading role in the Evros FCA championship, earning promotion to the Delta Ethniki on several occasions, with its last appearance in that division coming during the 2008–09 season. From 2009 to 2023, the club competed in the First Category of the Evros FCA. During the 2012–13 and 2018–19 seasons, it won the Evros FCA First Category championship. In 2013, the team failed to secure promotion through the 2013 FCA Winners' Championship, while in 2019, the club's administration decided not to enter the Gamma Ethniki, remaining in the Evros FCA regional league on both occasions.

During the 2022–23 season, the club won the Evros FCA championship and participated in the 2023 Greek FCA Winners' Championship, where it secured promotion and a return to the Gamma Ethniki after 25 years. In the 2025–26 season, Orestis suffered relegation back to the local leagues of the Evros FCA, following a three-year spell in the third division.

== Crest and colours ==
The official colours of M.G.S. Orestis Orestiada are light blue and white. The club's crest depicts Orestes, the mythical founder and namesake of the ancient city of Orestias, symbolizing the deep historic roots and identity of the team within the region.

== Stadium ==
The club uses Orestiada Municipal Stadium as its home ground.

== League history ==
- Beta Ethniki (2 seasons): 1969–70, 1971–72
- Gamma Ethniki (10 seasons): 1966–67, 1979–80, 1981–82, 1994–95, 1995–96, 1996–97, 1997–98, 2023–24, 2024–25, 2025–26
- Delta Ethniki (16 seasons): 1982–83, 1983–84, 1984–85, 1986–87, 1988–89, 1989–90, 1990–91, 1991–92, 1992–93, 1993–94, 1998–99, 1999–2000, 2002–03, 2004–05, 2005–06, 2008–09

== Honours ==
=== Domestic ===
- Delta Ethniki Winners (1): 1993–94

=== Regional ===
- Evros FCA Championship Winners (10): 1970–71, 1978–79, 1980–81, 1985–86, 1987–88, 2003–04, 2007–08, 2012–13, 2018–19, 2022–23
- Evros FCA Cup Winners (13): 1977–78, 1978–79, 1981–82, 1982–83, 1986–87, 1988–89, 1989–90, 1990–91, 1993–94, 1998–99, 2003–04, 2023–24, 2025–26
- Thrace FCA Championship Winners (3): 1965–66, 1967–68, 1968–69

=== Friendly ===
- Orestiada Tournament Winners (1): 1994
