= Fokikos F.C. =

Fokikos
- Full name: Athlitikos Syllogos Fokikos; Αθλητικός Σύλλογος Φωκικός
- Founded: 1932; 94 years ago
- Ground: Amfissa Municipal Stadium
- Capacity: 1,000
- Chairman: Giannis Kougias
- Manager: Apostolos Papanikolaou
- League: Gamma Ethniki
- 2025–26: Phocis FCA First Division, 1st (promoted)
Home colours	Away colours

Athlitikos Syllogos Fokikos (Greek: Αθλητικός Σύλλογος Φωκικός, lit. Athletic Club Fokikos) is a Greek professional football club of Phocis, Greece, established in Amfissa. The club was first founded in 1932 (unofficially existed from 1928) under the name "Panamfissaikos" and twenty years later (1952) was renamed to "Amfissaikos". In 1964 was finally named "Fokikos" and currently plays in Gamma Ethniki, the third level of the Greek football league system. Team's colors are blue and white (alternatively red and white). Badge of the team consists of two olive tree branches, framing a ball.

== History ==
According to the newspaper "FOKIS" in the town of Amfissa existed Gymnastic Club of Amfissa or "Brotherhood of Amfissa" founded on 20 April 1896 which grew classic sports along with the music. During the Delphic Festival of 1926 Athletes of Desfina conquered most medals, so their colleagues from Amfissa who participated in national competitions, to be resented and urged a revived interest in the sport, which had died down. So many of them have fallen away, creating the "Panamfissaikos Football Club" as mentioned in the package features the newspaper of 14 July 1932.

== Constitution ==
The team's history begins in 1928 when it was first created as a "Panamfissaikos". Founders of the club are the doctors Harry Lalaounis and Panagiotis Lytras, the supporters N. Rekaitis, Andreas Kiriakopulos, K. Papathanasiu, G. Papadopulos and footballers and brothers Leonidas Deniozos, Costas Deniozos, John Deniozos. The first benefactor of the club was Angelos Sikelianos who donated a large sum of money. The poet was particularly concerned about the area, organizing the Delphic Festival and showed unfailing interest in the newly established club. Indeed, in his honor, a street near the municipal stadium of Amfissa has since been named. The first recorded game of the club takes place in Amfissa on May 3, 1931 against the Union Itea (Itea ancestor of Asteras Iteas). One year later (August 2, 1932) the club was officially recognized by the HFF. On May 15, 1952 the team was renamed "Amfissaikos". In the seasons 1961–62 and 1962–63 the club participated in the championship of the Second National. On November 18, 1964 it was officially renamed from Amfissaikos to "A.C. Fokikos". The statutes of the association also provides track maintenance department, which has never officially established.

== Older Awards ==
Fokikos did successfully participate in many 4th division leagues. During the 1960s and 1970s Fokida and Fthiotida champions had participated in a "special amateur's championship" which promoted 1 team for the 2nd National League. At that time and up to 1985, Fthiotida's and Fokida's teams were in the same Football Union. During the 1975–76 season fokikos – having veteran Alekos Iordanou as coach-player (former A.E.K. Athens player)- won Fthiotis/Fokis Football Union's both titles, cup and championship.

== Fokikos in the National Amateur's Championships ==
Fokikos was one of the 80 amateur teams that participated in the first official National Amateur's Championship (1977–78 season) In 1981–82 season Fokikos relegated to the first division of Fthiotis/Fokis Union. Three years later, Fokikos returned to the National Amateur's Championship (1985), beating Pallamiakos (1–0), in extra game. Shortly (1987), A.C. Fokikos returns to the Fokis Union Local League. As the National Amateur's Championship becomes the fourth division of Greek football, Fokikos returned in 1990, finally losing the title to A.P.S. Patra, having just one point less. Although, in the 1991–92 season Fokikos won the championship and qualified to third division.

== Tickets records ==
During 1991–92 season (March 22, 1992), game between Fokikos & Naupaktiakos Asteras (0–0), the attendance at the municipal stadium of Amfissa was 4.500 (fourth division game). Also, according to the newspaper "Fos ton Spor" in May 1974 for the special championship during the game between Fokikos & P.A.S. Preveza 1–0 the spectators were 6,500.

== Honours ==
=== Leagues ===
- Fourth Division
  - Winners (3): 1991–92, 1994–95, 2007–08
- Phocis FCA First Division
  - Winners (10): 1987–88, 1989–90, 1997–98, 2000–01, 2001–02, 2005–06, 2017–18, 2019–20, 2025–26
- Phthiotis-Phocis FCA First Division
  - Winners (4): 1964–65, 1973–74, 1975–76, 1984–85

=== Cups ===
- Phocis FCA Cup
  - Winners (12): 1986–87, 1988–89, 1989–90, 1991–92, 1993–94, 1994–95, 1999–00, 2000–01, 2002–03, 2003–04, 2006–07, 2016–17
- Phocis FCA Super Cup
  - Winners (1): 2018
- Phthiotis-Phocis FCA Cup
  - Winners (3): 1974–75, 1975–76, 1976–77

== Fokikos Managers ==
- Nick Zarkadis (1950–1952, 1954–1956, 1980)
- Staikos Vasilis (1959 1962–63)
- Leonidas (Lelos) Adamantidis (1958–1959,1961–1962 and 1974–1975 and 1977)
- Pantelis Smargdis (1965)
- Tasos Gatos-Mauropoulos Vagelis (1969–1970)
- Stathis Mavridis (1971–72)
- Lakis Litopoulos (1972)
- Aleko Yordan (1972–73, 1973–74)
- Babis Kotridis (1974)
- Costas Zogzas (1974–75)
- Pantelis Karalis (1975)
- Kollias, C. (1976)
- Ploubis Anastasios (1977–1979)
- Yiannis Mpoukalis (1979)
- Leonidas Giannelos (1980–81)
- Aleko Yordan, Antonis Ioannou (1981–1982)
- Giannis Ioannou (1985)
- Koutroulis Peter (1986)
- Nikolaos Argiroulis (1986–87)
- Panagiotis Psichogios (1987–88)
- Xenakis Michalis (1988–1989)
- Giannis Voudouris (1990–91)
- Kostas Karampelousis (1991)
- Nikos Patsiavouras (1992–93)
- Antonis Ioannou, Dimitris Katsifloros, Petros Leventakos (1993–1994)
- Nikos Gourgiotis (1994–95)
- Bojan Milisevic (Serbian, August 1995 to January 10, 1996)
- Thanasis Dimitriadis, Antonis Ioannou (1996)
- Giannis Gravanis (1996–97)
- Dimitris Katsifloros (1998 and 2001–02)
- George Tambakis (1983–1984–1985 and 2002–03)
- Christos Vasiliou, Giannis Markodimos (2003–2004)
- Vangelis Tsoukalis (2005-a)
- Spyridon Dimopoulos (2005-b)
- Thomas Anagnostopoulos, Achilleas Manetas (2005-c)
- Thomas Anagnostopoulos (2005-2006)
- Giannis Gaitatzis (2006–07)
- Makis Vaklaidis (2007–2008)
- Apostolis Charalampidis (2008–2009)
- Kostas Livas, Michalis Kasapis (2009–2010)
- GeorgiosKaberidis, Michalis Kasapis (2010–2011)
- Petros Michos, Terzis Konstantinos (2012)
- Krzysztof Warzycha, Petros Dimitriou (2012–2013)
- Giorgos Koutsis (2013–2014)
- Giorgos Maradas, Giannis Lytras, Achilleas Manetas (2014–15)
- Nick Andreou (2015–16)
- Achilleas Manetas, Giannis Lytras (2016-2017)
- Giannis Lytras, Giorgos Karatzoglis (2017-2018)
- Giannis Lytras, Nikos Kokkinos (2018-2019)
- Thomas Anagnostopoulos (2019-2020)

== Notable Presidents ==
Old crest

- Andreas Kiriakopulos (1932)
- Charalambos Lalaounis
- Ioannis Moskachlaidis (1946 & 1974)
- Zitogiannos (1950)
- Nikolaos Kordonis (1950)
- Ioannis Gidogiannos (1952)
- Konstantinos Evagelou (1953)
- Efstathios Asimakopoulos (1959 and 1965)
- K. Prigis (1968)
- Papageorgiou Evagelos (1968–1970)
- Avgeris Zumas (1971–1972)
- Athanasios Psimoulis(1966–1967 and 1970)
- Dimitrios Trigas (1975)
- Elias Tzamtzis (1976–1978 and 1982)
- Ioannis Kourelis (1976)
- G. Katramatos (1976)
- Stylianos Kourelis (1985 & 1989–1990 & 1991–93)
- Tagalis Agapitos (1985–1988,1996–1998)
- Athanasios Kioutsikis (1987–1988)
- Vassilios Tzamtzis (1993–95)
- Vasilopoulos Panagiotis (1998–1999)
- Karanasos Charalabos (1961 and 1999–2000)
- Giorgos Konstantopoulos (2002)
- Prokopios Despotidis (2003–05)
- Dimitrios Karagiannis (2005–07)
- Simos Papadimitriou (2007– 31/12/2015)
- Tsigas Ilias (5/8/2016–18-10-2018)
- Oikonomou Ilias(18-10-2018 present)

== First big success -The recent progress ==
In 1992 Fokikos won the title in Group D of National 4th League thus firstly qualifying for the 3rd National League (1992–93 season). Players involved: Anagnostopoulos, Karampelousis, Aravanis, Katsimpardis, Papadimas, Karadimos, Manetas, Livas, Stephanopoulos, Markodimos, A. And D. Karanasios, Matzoros, Ntalakouras, Malagrakis, Roditis, etc. The achievement of the Amfissa's Club was reiterated three years later (1995–96 season) but this time Fokikos didn't distinguish due to works in its stadium, having to use Aspra Spitia village Stadium as home ground. During the 2007–08 season, under the coaching of Makis Vaklaidis, Fokikos competed in the 4th Group of National 4th League, won the title and reached 3rd National League thirdly in its history. Indeed, with Apostle Charalambides as coach in 2008–09 season, Fokikos achieved to renew for the first time ever on the eve of the Third National, an achievement that was repeated in 2009–10 season with new coach Mike Kasapis replacing Costas Livas. From year to year Fokikos appears more and more powerful, resulting in 2010–11 season to finish at third place, which secured its promotion firstly in its history to the "Football League" (formerly "2nd National League"). On the occasion of 80 years since the formal establishment of the team in 1932, both Club Management and Fokikos' fans prepare a series of events as well as projects including a book publication by Tsigas Elias and Avramikos Nickolaos, as responsible authors.

== Sources ==
- International Football Data (https://web.archive.org/web/20121222221144/http://www.rsssf.com/)
- "Athletic Eco" Newspaper (In Greek language: Εφημερίδα "ΑΘΛΗΤΙΚΗ ΗΧΩ") of May 7, 1950
- "Light of Sports" Newspaper archive
- Dimitris Amountzias, "The Story of A.C. Lamia"
- Chris J. Ntantoumis, "History of the Football in Biotis"
- "FOKIS" Newspaper archive
- Greek National Football 2nd & 3rd Leagues Union
- Alecos Kailas " 33 Years from the Establishment of Pallamiaki" Published by "(NEW STEP)ΝΕΟΝ ΒΗΜΑ" Lamia 1962
- Dimitris Natsios" History of Football in Lamia" (1912–1999)
