= Paraskevas Prikas =

Greek footballer

Paris Prikas
Personal information
- Full name: Paraskevas Prikas
- Date of birth: 17 November 1998 (age 27)
- Place of birth: Athens, Greece
- Height: 1.76 m (5 ft 9 in)
- Position: Attacking midfielder

Team information
- Current team: Haidari

Youth career
- Panelefsiniakos

Senior career*
Years	Team	Apps	(Gls)
2016–2017	Doxa Megalopolis		
2017–2018	Fostiras		
2018–2019	Aspropyrgos		
2019	Luftëtari	10	(0)
2020	Episkopi		
2020–2021	Asteras Vlachioti	15	(0)
2021–2022	Almopos Aridea	30	(2)
2022–2023	Anagennisi Karditsa	0	(0)
2023–2025	Panargiakos	43	(1)
2025	Mandraikos		
2025–2026	Asteras Magoula		
2026–	Haidari		
- * Club domestic league appearances and goals as of 9 December 2024

Paraskevas Prikas (Greek: Παρασκευάς Πρίκας; born 17 November 1998) is a Greek professional footballer who plays as an attacking midfielder for Haidari.

== Honours ==
Aspropyrgos

- Gamma Ethniki: 2018–19
