= A.E. Didymoteicho F.C. =

A.E. Didymoteicho
- Full name: Athlitiki Enosi Didymoteicho
- Founded: 1933; 93 years ago
- Ground: Didymoteicho Municipal Stadium
- Chairman: Argyris Gogakis
- Manager: Christos Mavrakis
- League: Evros FCA First Division
- 2025–26: Evros FCA First Division, 4th
Home colours	Away colours

A.E. Didymoteicho Football Club (Greek: Α.Ε. Διδυμοτείχου) is a Greek football club based in Didymoteicho, Evros, Greece.

== Honours ==
=== Domestic Titles and honours ===
  - Amateur Cup: 1
    - 1979–80
  - Evros FCA First Division: 8
    - 1969–70, 1973–74, 1989–90, 2001–02, 2014–15, 2015–16, 2016–17, 2019–20
  - Evros FCA Cup Winners: 3
    - 1979–80, 2016–17, 2019–20
