= Rethymniakos F.C. =

Association football club in Greece

Rethymniakos
- Full name: Rethymniakos Athlitikos Omilos
- Founded: 1961; 65 years ago
- Ground: Sochora Municipal Stadium
- Capacity: 2,500
- Chairman: Konstantinos Papadakis
- Manager: Andreas Tsoupakis
- League: Gamma Ethniki
- 2025–26: Rethymno FCA First Division, 1st (promoted)
- Website: Official website
Home colours	Away colours

Rethymniakos Football Club (Greek: Ρεθυμνιακός Αθλητικός Όμιλος) is a Greek football club based in Rethymno, Crete. The official foundation year of the club is 1961, and its official colors are blue and white.

== History ==
=== Foundation and Early History ===
Rethymniakos was founded in the summer of 1961 through the merger of PAS Asteras Rethymno and AO Keravnos Rethymno, both of which had originally been established in 1946 and were re-established following their merger.

In 1963 and 1964, the club won the Rethymno FCA championship. In the 1964–65 season, Rethymniakos competed in the Beta Ethniki; during its sole appearance in the division, it achieved notable results, including a 2–0 victory over Talos Chania on the opening matchday, a 2–2 draw against OFI on 25 October 1964, wins over Ergotelis (2–1 away and 2–0 at home), and a 0–0 home draw against Vyzas Megara in front of 2,000 spectators in its final home match.

In the 1965–66 and 1966–67 seasons, the club competed in the newly established Gamma Ethniki championship.

=== Mergers and Renaming ===
In the summer of 1967, by order of the Rethymno Military Administration, Rethymniakos merged with AO Neos Asteras Rethymno and AO Neos Keravnos Rethymno, being renamed to "AO Rethymno", while the latter two clubs were re-established following the fall of the military regime.

In 1983, AO Rethymno merged with Atromitos Rethymno (founded in the 1920s and one of the four founding clubs of Rethymno FCA) to create "Enosi Atromitos Rethymniakos", commonly known as "EAR". Starting from the local Rethymno FCA championship, EAR climbed up to the Beta Ethniki, where it played for nine consecutive seasons. In 1999, the powerful club dissolved, though the youth team "EAR 2000" had already been founded in 1996 and continued to compete in the local divisions thereafter.

=== Refounding and Return ===
In 2007, EAR 2000 was renamed, marking the reappearance of the historic Rethymniakos name in the local championship from the 2007–08 season. In the 2009–10 season, the club won the Rethymno FCA championship and earned promotion to the Delta Ethniki. Rethymniakos competed in the Delta Ethniki for two consecutive seasons—initially in the 2010–11 season as "Podosfairiki Enosi Rethymno" following a temporary merger with AO Neos Asteras and AO Neos Keravnos Rethymno, and subsequently in the 2011–12 season, at the end of which it was relegated.

In the 2018–19 season, Rethymniakos finished as the runner-up in the Rethymno FCA championship and earned promotion to the Fourth-tier Gamma Ethniki, taking the place of the EPS Rethymno champion AE Mylopotamos, which withdrew from the division. Rethymniakos subsequently competed in the Fourth-tier Gamma Ethniki during the 2019–20 and 2020–21 seasons.

In the 2023–24 season, Rethymniakos won the Rethymno FCA championship and competed in the promotion play-offs for the Gamma Ethniki. Although the team failed to earn promotion on the pitch, a vacant spot subsequently arose, allowing Rethymniakos to achieve promotion nonetheless. However, the team failed to secure its place in the division, finishing bottom of the 4th Group of the Gamma Ethniki in the 2024–25 season. It made a swift return, winning the Rethymno FCA championship for the 5th time in its history during the 2025–26 season to earn promotion back to the national divisions.

== Crest and colours ==
The club's colors are blue and white, and its emblem features a dolphin with a football.

== Honours ==
=== Regional ===
- Rethymno FCA First Division
  - Winners (5): 1962–63, 1963–64, 2009–10, 2023–24, 2025–26
- Rethymno FCA Cup
  - Winners (7): 1961–62, 1962–63, 1963–64, 1964–65, 1965–66, 1966–67, 2024–25
- Rethymno FCA Super Cup
  - Winners (3): 2019, 2024, 2025
