= Leonidas Giannelos =

Greek football player

Leonidas Giannelos (Greek: Λεωνίδας Γιαννέλος; 7 July 1947, in Makrakomi, Phthiotis – 10 December 2012, in Lamia) was a Greek international football player, one of the most important to come out of Central Greece.

== Sources ==
- Newspaper "Μακρακώμης λόγος" - Article: "Το σπίρτο"
