= Alexandros Natsiopoulos =

Greek footballer

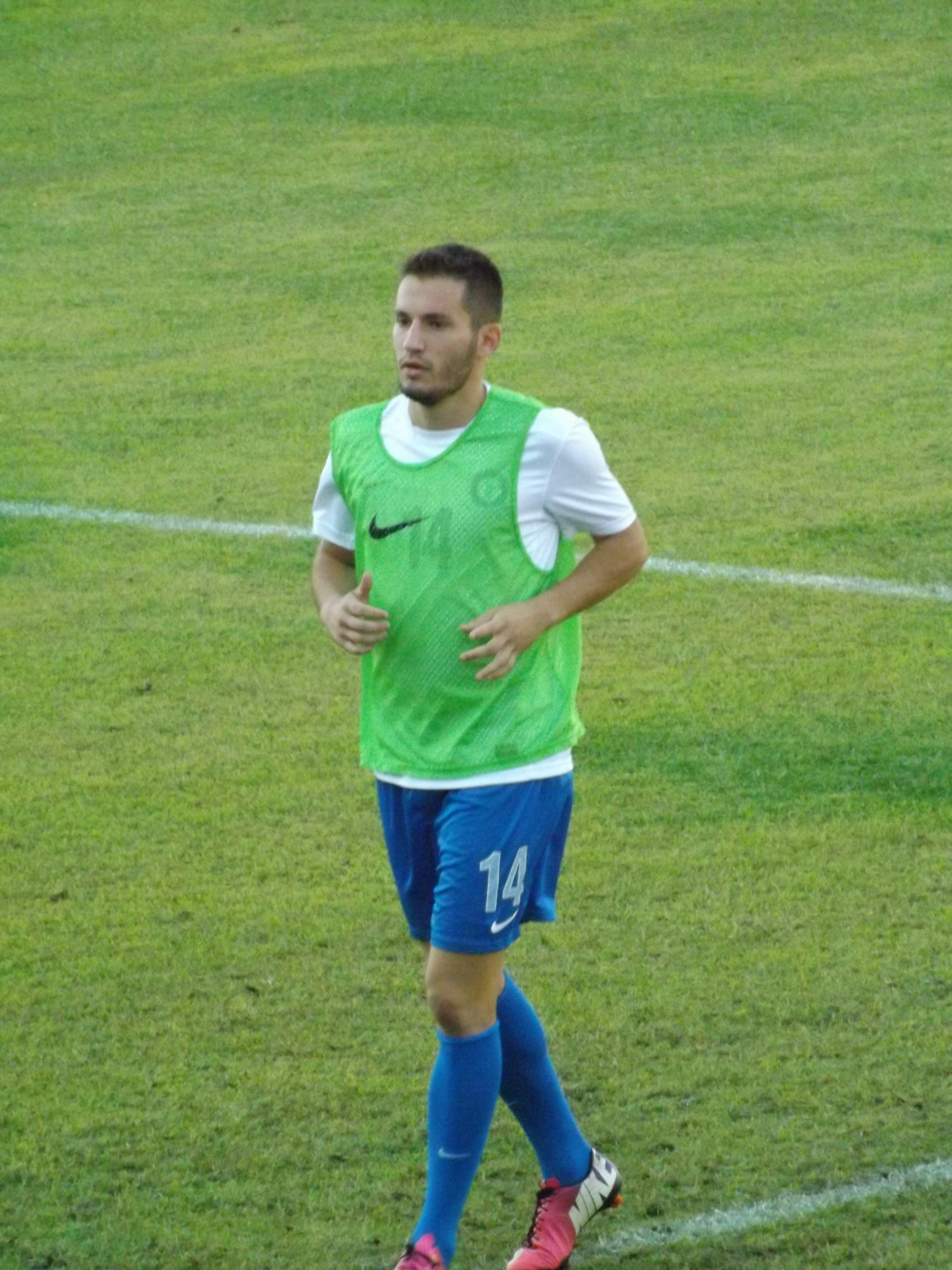

Personal information
- Full name: Alexandros Natsiopoulos
- Date of birth: 5 January 1991 (age 35)
- Place of birth: Thessaloniki, Greece
- Height: 1.78 m (5 ft 10 in)
- Position: Attacking midfielder

Youth career
- –2011: Iraklis

Senior career*
Years	Team	Apps	(Gls)
2011–2014	Iraklis	9	(0)
2014	Ethnikos Gazoros	11	(3)
2014–2015	Apollon Pontus	22	(0)
2015–2016	Lamia	22	(3)
2016–2017	Anagennisi Deryneia	18	(0)
2017	BSV Schwarz-Weiß Rehden	4	(0)
2017	Inter Leipzig	1	(0)
2017–2019	Doxa Drama	12	(0)
2019	Aspropyrgos	0	(0)
2019–2020	Ialysos	13	(0)
2020–2021	Kalamata	20	(0)
2021–2022	P.A.O. Rouf	6	(0)
2022–2023	Marko		
2023–2024	Acharnaikos	5	(4)
2024–	Aris Voulas		
- * Club domestic league appearances and goals as of April 2026

Alexandros Natsiopoulos (Greek: Αλέξανδρος Νατσιόπουλος; born 5 January 1991) is a Greek professional footballer who plays as an attacking midfielder for East Attica Football Clubs Association Division 1 club, Aris Voulas.

== Club career ==
Natsiopoulos began football at the academies Iraklis. He debuted for Iraklis in the club's first and only season in the Football League 2 in a home win against Megas Alexandros Irakleia on 11 March 2012.
