= Alexandroupoli F.C. =

Ποδοσφαιρικός Όμιλος Αλεξανδρούπολης Alexandroupoli Football Club
- Founded: 2019; 7 years ago
- Stadium: Alexandroupoli Municipal Stadium "Fotis Kosmas"
- Capacity: 3.000
- Chairman: Alekos Patsioras
- Manager: Georgios Mystridis
- League: Evros FCA First Division
- 2025–26: Evros FCA First Division, 2nd
Home colours	Away colours

Alexandroupoli Football Club (Greek: Ποδοσφαιρικός Όμιλος Αλεξανδρούπολης) is a Greek football club based in Alexandroupoli, Evros, Greece.

== History ==
The club was established in 2019, after the merger of Enosi Antheia/Aristino FC and AO Thrace FC.

== Honours ==
=== Regional ===
- Evros FCA Championship
  - Winners (1): 2023−24
- Evros FCA Cup
  - Winners (3): 2021−22, 2022−23, 2024–25
