= Odysseas Androutsos F.C. =

Androutsos Gravia
- Founded: 1959
- Ground: Gravia Municipal Stadium
- Capacity: 1,000
- Chairman: Aristidis Tsounis
- Manager: Thomas Anagnostopoulos
- League: Phocis FCA First Division
- 2025–26: Phocis FCA First Division, 4th
Home colours	Away colours

A.S. Androutsos Gravia (Greek: Α.Σ. Ανδρούτσος Γραβιάς A.S. Androutsos Gravias) is an football club based in the village of Gravia in Phocis, Greece. The club had been founded in 1959. Its logo and jerseys were red and white, its home games were a navy blue shirt and socks with sky blue pants, and during its away games, it had a white shirt and a sky blue pants.

== Overview ==
It played in the Gamma Ethniki in the northern group. It had been playing in the Gravia public stadium. It was relegated during the 2006-07 season and did not have any chances on remaining in the third division, in the 2007-08 season, they played in the Delta Ethniki and the prefectural division.

It won their first and only title in 2006 and in the 2006-07 season, it entered for the first time to the National Division.

In 2008 because of financial difficulties the team merged with Themistoklis Egaleo. The club continued to take part in Delta Ethniki, to a new stadium and under the name Themistoklis Egaleo.

== Origin ==
The team is named after one of the most famous Greek Revolutionary leaders known as Odysseas Androutsos who heroically battled in the Battle of Gravia in 1821.

== Honours ==
- Delta Ethniki: 1

2005-06

- Phocis Football Clubs Association - First Division - Championships: 2

2003-04, 2011-12

- Phocis Football Clubs Association - First Division - Cups: 3

2004-05, 2005-06, 2012-13

- Phocis Football Clubs Association - First Division - Super Cups: 1

2012
