= Panakrotiriakos F.C. =

Panakrotiriakos
- Full name: Panakrotiriakos Athlitikos Omilos
- Founded: 1991; 35 years ago
- Ground: Mournies Municipal Ground
- Chairman: Nikolaos Valasis
- Manager: Giorgos Koltzos
- League: Gamma Ethniki
- 2025–26: Chania FCA First Division, 1st (promoted)
- Website: Official website
Home colours

Panakrotiriakos Athlitikos Omilos (Greek: Πανακρωτηριακός Αθλητικός Όμιλος) is a Greek football club based in Akrotiri, Chania, Crete. Founded in 1991 by Michail Kallergis and Ioannis Verganelakis, the club plays its home matches at the Kathiana Municipal Stadium in the village of Kathiana. The club's traditional colors are black and red.

== History ==
Panakrotiriakos F.C. was founded in 1981 under the name Akrotiri Kaminia Athletic Club (Greek: Αθλητικός Όμιλος Ακρωτηρίου Καμίνια). Based in Kampani, Akrotiri, the club competed in the local leagues of the Chania Football Clubs Association, specifically in the Second Division, from 1981 until 1993. The club's first major success came during the 2004–05 season when it reached the final of Chania FCA Cup at the Monachi Elia Stadium.

During the 2009–10 season, Panakrotiriakos finished first in the local Chania FCA First Division, earning historic promotion to Delta Ethniki for the first time. That same year, the team competed in the Chania FCA Super Cup, losing 3–1 to cup winners AO Chania at the Chania Municipal Stadium.

During the 2016–17 season, Panakrotiriakos reached the Chania Cup FCA final against the U20 team of Platanias. After the match ended in a 1–1 draw, Platanias emerged victorious in the penalty shootout with a 7–6 scoreline.

In the 2018–19 season, Panakrotiriakos finished first in the Chania FCA First Division for the second time, earning promotion to Gamma Ethniki for the 2019–20 season. The Cretan club placed fourth in its group and qualified for the play-offs. However, for the following 2020–21 season, the team opted not to enter Gamma Ethniki and returned to the local Chania FCA league.

During the 2025–26 season, the club won the Chania FCA championship and secured promotion to Gamma Ethniki.

In the 2026 Chania FCA Super Cup, Panakrotiriakos fell short in a hard-fought final, suffering a narrow 4–3 defeat to Platanias.

== Honours ==
=== Regional ===
- Chania FCA First Division (3): 2009–10, 2018–19, 2025–26
- Chania FCA Cup (1): 2019–20
