= 2018–19 Gamma Ethniki =

Gamma Ethniki
- Season: 2018–19
- Dates: 29 September 2018 – 14 April 2019

The 2018–19 Gamma Ethniki is the 36th season since the official establishment of the third tier of Greek football in 1983. It start on 30 September 2018. This year 12 teams will be promoted. After the finish of the eight groups, the first team of each group will be promoted to Football League and then the 8 runner-up teams after draw will play two legs to determine which four teams will be promoted.

107 teams are divided into eight groups according to geographical criteria.

Neos Amfilochos, Doxa Kranoula, APO Kanaris Nenita, AO Panthyreatikos, AO Potamia Megalo Chorio, AE Vathyllou Pansamiakou and Aigiros Mystegnon withdrew from the league before the group draw.

== Group 1 ==
=== Teams ===
Locations of the 2018–19 Gamma Ethniki Group 1 clubs

Team	Location	Last season
Nestos Chrysoupoli	Chrysoupoli	Group 1, 6th
Orfeas Xanthi	Xanthi	Group 1, 7th
Kavala	Kavala	Group 1, 3rd
Apollon Paralimnio	Paralimnio	Group 1, 1st
Aetos Orfano	Ofrynio	Group 1, 2nd
Aris Avato	Avato	Group 1, 5th
Panserraikos	Serres	Football League, 14th
Ethnikos Alexandroupoli	Alexandroupoli	Evros FCA champion
PAOK Kosmio	Kosmio	Thrace FCA champion
Aspis Xanthi	Xanthi	Xanthi FCA champion
Keravnos Perni	Perni	Kavala FCA champion
Ethnikos Sidirokastro	Sidirokastro	Serres FCA champion
AE Kalampaki	Kalampaki	Drama FCA champion
Alexandros Kilkis	Kilkis	Kilkis FCA champion

=== Standings ===
Pos	Team	Pld	W	D	L	GF	GA	GD	Pts	Promotion or relegation
1	Kavala (C, P)	26	21	3	2	66	9	+57	66	Promotion to the Football League
2	Nestos Chrysoupoli (Q)	26	20	5	1	52	14	+38	65	Qualification to promotion play-offs
3	Panserraikos	26	14	4	8	42	24	+18	46	
4	Apollon Paralimnio	26	13	6	7	40	20	+20	45	
5	Aetos Orfano	26	11	6	9	44	34	+10	39	
6	Orfeas Xanthi	26	11	6	9	34	25	+9	39	
7	Aris Avato	26	11	5	10	27	22	+5	38	
8	Alexandros Kilkis	26	9	10	7	26	20	+6	37	
9	Keravnos Perni	26	9	8	9	29	28	+1	32 (Note: Keravnos Perni deducted three points for this season by Hellenic Football Federation.)	
10	AE Kalampaki (R)	26	7	8	11	19	29	−10	29	Relegation to FCA championships
11	Ethnikos Alexandroupoli (R)	26	7	3	16	26	51	−25	24	Relegation to FCA championships
12	Aspis Xanthi (R)	26	6	2	18	19	59	−40	20	Relegation to FCA championships
13	Ethnikos Sidirokastro (R)	26	3	4	19	12	57	−45	13	Relegation to FCA championships
14	PAOK Kosmio (R)	26	3	4	19	21	65	−44	13	Relegation to FCA championships

Source: Hellenic Football Federation (in Greek)
Rules for classification: 1) points; 2) head-to-head points; 3) head-to-head goal difference.
(C) Champions; (P) Promoted; (Q) Qualified for the phase indicated; (R) Relegated

== Group 2 ==
=== Teams ===
Locations of the 2018–19 Gamma Ethniki Group 2 clubs

Team	Location	Last season
APE Langadas	Langadas	Group 2, 8th
Almopos Aridea	Aridaea	Group 2, 4th
Makedonikos	Efkarpia	Group 2, 3rd
Agrotikos Asteras	Evosmos	Group 2, 7th
Edessaikos	Edessa	Group 2, 5th
Aris Palaiochori	Palaiochori	Group 2, 2nd
Ermis Amyntaio	Amyntaio	Group 3, 4th
Veria	Veria	Football League, 17th
PAO Koufalia	Koufalia	Macedonia FCA champion
Olympiakos Kymina	Kymina	Macedonia FCA 2nd
Giannitsa	Giannitsa	Pella FCA champion as Doxa Xirovouni
Niki Agathia	Agkathia	Imathia FCA champion
Meliteas Meliti	Meliti	Florina FCA champion
Triglia	Triglia	Chalkidiki FCA Champion

=== Standings ===
Pos	Team	Pld	W	D	L	GF	GA	GD	Pts	Promotion or relegation
1	Veria (C, P)	26	17	6	3	51	15	+36	57	Promotion to the Football League
2	Triglia (P, Q)	26	17	4	5	39	19	+20	55	Qualification to promotion play-offs
3	Niki Agathia	26	14	11	1	31	11	+20	53	
4	Aris Palaiochori	26	15	7	4	45	27	+18	52	
5	Edessaikos	26	12	9	5	45	14	+31	45	
6	Almopos Aridea	26	11	9	6	36	17	+19	42	
7	Giannitsa	26	10	7	9	31	25	+6	37	
8	Makedonikos	26	10	6	10	32	30	+2	36	
9	Agrotikos Asteras	26	9	7	10	25	29	−4	34	
10	PAO Koufalia (R)	26	5	7	14	20	39	−19	22	Relegation to FCA championships
11	Olympiakos Kymina (R)	26	5	7	14	12	32	−20	22	Relegation to FCA championships
12	Meliteas Meliti	26	5	3	18	28	66	−38	18	Relegation to FCA championships
13	Ermis Amyntaio (R)	26	2	7	17	20	52	−32	13	Relegation to FCA championships
14	APE Langadas (R)	26	3	4	19	14	53	−39	13	Relegation to FCA championships

Source: Hellenic Football Federation (in Greek)
Rules for classification: 1) points; 2) head-to-head points; 3) head-to-head goal difference.
(C) Champions; (P) Promoted; (Q) Qualified for the phase indicated; (R) Relegated

== Group 3 ==
=== Teams ===
Locations of the 2018–19 Gamma Ethniki Group 3 clubs

Team	Location	Last season
Thesprotos	Igoumenitsa	Group 3, 5th
Tilikratis	Lefkada	Group 3, 1st
Makedonikos Foufas	Foufas	Group 3, 3rd
AE Lefkimmi	Lefkimmi	Group 3, 6th
Megas Alexandros Kallithea	Kastoria (Kallithea neighborhood)	Kastoria FCA champion
Thriamvos Serviana	Serviana	Epirus FCA champion
Makedonikos Siatista	Siatista	Kozani FCA champion
~~AO Floriada~~	~~Floriada~~	~~Arta FCA champion~~
PAS Acheron Kanallaki	Kanallaki	Preveza-Lefkada FCA champion
Grevena Aerata	Grevena	Grevena FCA champion
Souli Paramythia	Paramythia	Thesprotia FCA champion
Kronos Argyrades	Argyrades	Kerkyra FCA champion
Nafpaktiakos Asteras	Nafpaktos	Aetoloacarnania FCA champion

=== Standings ===
Pos	Team	Pld	W	D	L	GF	GA	GD	Pts	Promotion or relegation
1	Kronos Argyrades (C, P)	24	13	9	2	28	9	+19	48	Promotion to the Football League
2	Thesprotos (P, Q)	24	13	8	3	38	13	+25	47	Qualification to promotion play-offs
3	PAS Acheron Kanallaki	24	14	5	5	37	17	+20	47	
4	Makedonikos Foufas	24	12	6	6	40	22	+18	42	
5	AE Lefkimmi	24	12	6	6	43	19	+24	42	
6	Nafpaktiakos Asteras	24	11	7	6	37	22	+15	40	
7	Souli Paramythia	24	12	4	8	33	20	+13	40	
8	Tilikratis	24	12	3	9	32	21	+11	39	
9	Megas Alexandros Kallithea (R)	24	10	2	12	33	29	+4	32	Relegation to FCA championships
10	Thriamvos Serviana (R)	24	8	6	10	29	23	+6	30	Relegation to FCA championships
11	Makedonikos Siatista (R)	24	6	4	14	24	37	−13	22	Relegation to FCA championships
12	Grevena Aerata (R)	24	1	2	21	9	86	−77	5	Relegation to FCA championships
13	AO Floriada (R)	24	0	2	22	0	65	−65	−7 (Note: AO Floriada were deducted nine points for this season by Hellenic Football Federation and were also expelled from the championship.)	Relegation to FCA championships

Source: Hellenic Football Federation (in Greek)
Rules for classification: 1) points; 2) head-to-head points; 3) head-to-head goal difference.
(C) Champions; (P) Promoted; (Q) Qualified for the phase indicated; (R) Relegated

== Group 4 ==
=== Teams ===
Locations of the 2018–19 Gamma Ethniki Group 4 clubs

Team	Location	Last season
Niki Volos	Nea Ionia Volos	Group 4, 2nd
Olympiacos Volos 1937	Volos	Group 4, 5th
Almyros	Almyros	Group 4, 4th
Asteras Itea	Itea	Group 4, 3rd
AO Sellana	Sellana	Group 4, 7th
Pierikos	Katerini	Group 2, 6th
~~Anagennisi Karditsa~~	~~Karditsa~~	~~Football League, 13th~~
AO Stylida	Stylida	Phthiotis FCA champion
Oikonomos Tsaritsani	Tsaritsani	Larissa FCA champion
Meteora	Kalabaka	Trikala FCA champion
Theseus Agria	Agria	Thessaly FCA champion
Fokikos	Amfissa	Phocis FCA champion
Achilleas Neokaisareia	Neokaisareia	Pieria FCA champion
Apollon Makrychori	Makrychori	Karditsa FCA champion

=== Standings ===
Pos	Team	Pld	W	D	L	GF	GA	GD	Pts	Promotion or relegation
1	Olympiacos Volos (C, P)	26	22	3	1	64	12	+52	69	Promotion to the Football League
2	Niki Volos (Q)	26	22	3	1	65	11	+54	69	Qualification to promotion play-offs
3	Asteras Itea	26	12	8	6	40	27	+13	44	
4	Meteora	26	11	9	6	40	25	+15	42	
5	Almyros	26	9	9	8	34	20	+14	36	
6	AO Sellana	26	10	6	10	33	28	+5	36	
7	Pierikos	26	9	8	9	37	32	+5	35	
8	Theseus Agria	26	10	5	11	31	37	−6	35	
9	Oikonomos Tsaritsani	26	8	11	7	31	34	−3	35	
10	Achilleas Neokaisareia (R)	26	7	9	10	32	39	−7	30	Relegation to FCA championships
11	Apollon Makrychori (R)	26	7	4	15	23	38	−15	25	Relegation to FCA championships
12	Stylida (R)	26	7	3	16	23	61	−38	24	Relegation to FCA championships
13	Fokikos (R)	26	4	9	13	22	42	−20	21	Relegation to FCA championships
14	Anagennisi Karditsa (R)	26	0	1	25	7	76	−69	−8 (Note: On Tuesday (15/1), the Board of Directors of Anagennisi Karditsa, announced the withdrawal of the football team from the 3rd National Championship.)	Relegation to FCA championships

Source: Hellenic Football Federation (in Greek)
Rules for classification: 1) points; 2) head-to-head points; 3) head-to-head goal difference.
(C) Champions; (P) Promoted; (Q) Qualified for the phase indicated; (R) Relegated

== Group 5 ==
=== Teams ===
Locations of the 2018–19 Gamma Ethniki Group 5 clubs

Team	Location	Last season
Ionikos	Nikaia	Group 6, 7th
Ethnikos Piraeus	Piraeus	Group 6, 1st
Proodeftiki	Nikaia	Group 6, 2nd
Keratsini	Keratsini	Group 6, 5th
OF Ierapetra	Ierapetra	Group 8, 3rd
Atsalenios	Heraklion (Atsalenio neighborhood)	Group 8, 5th
Palaiochora	Palaiochora	Group 8, 6th
Atromitos Piraeus	Piraeus (Kaminia neighborhood)	Piraeus FCA champion Group A
Ampelakiakos	Ampelakia	Piraeus FCA champion Group B
AE Neapoli	Neapoli	Lasithi FCA champion
Giouchtas	Archanes	Heraklion FCA champion
Episkopi	Episkopi	Rethymno FCA champion
AEEK SYN.KA	Chania	Chania FCA champion

=== Standings ===
Pos	Team	Pld	W	D	L	GF	GA	GD	Pts	Promotion or relegation
1	OF Ierapetra (C, P)	24	15	5	4	43	14	+29	50	Promotion to the Football League
2	Ionikos (P, Q)	24	13	8	3	32	11	+21	47	Qualification to promotion play-offs
3	Ethnikos Piraeus	24	12	8	4	32	17	+15	44	
4	Episkopi	24	12	6	6	43	23	+20	42	
5	Giouchtas	24	10	10	4	31	19	+12	40	
6	AEEK SYN.KA	24	8	11	5	30	23	+7	35	
7	Atsalenios	24	8	10	6	25	18	+7	34	
8	Keratsini	24	9	6	9	27	30	−3	33	
9	Proodeftiki (R)	24	7	8	9	17	21	−4	29	Relegation to FCA championships
10	Ampelakiakos (R)	24	6	7	11	18	27	−9	25	Relegation to FCA championships
11	Palaiochora (R)	24	5	5	14	23	45	−22	20	Relegation to FCA championships
12	Atromitos Piraeus (R)	24	1	8	15	19	50	−31	11	Relegation to FCA championships
13	AE Neapoli (R)	24	2	4	18	14	56	−42	10	Relegation to FCA championships

Source: Hellenic Football Federation (in Greek)
Rules for classification: 1) points; 2) head-to-head points; 3) head-to-head goal difference.
(C) Champions; (P) Promoted; (Q) Qualified for the phase indicated; (R) Relegated

== Group 6 ==
=== Teams ===
Locations of the 2018–19 Gamma Ethniki Group 6 clubs

Team	Location	Last season
Diagoras Vrachnaiika	Vrachnaiika	Group 5, 6th
Asteras Amaliada	Amaliada	Group 5, 1st
Paniliakos	Pyrgos	Group 5, 3rd
PAO Varda	Varda	Group 5, 7th
Diagoras	Rhodes	Group 6, 4th
Ialysos	Ialysos	Group 6, 5th
Thyella Rafina	Rafina (Diastavrosi neighborhood)	Group 7, 6th
Acharnaikos	Acharnes	Football League, 18th
Panegialios	Aigio	Football League, 15th
Phoebus Kremasti	Kremasti	Dodecanese FCA champion
Palliniakos	Pallini	East Attica FCA champion
Panmovriakos	Riolos	Achaea FCA champion
Niki Tragano	Tragano	Elis FCA champion

=== Standings ===
Pos	Team	Pld	W	D	L	GF	GA	GD	Pts	Promotion or relegation
1	Ialysos (C, P)	24	19	4	1	49	7	+42	61	Promotion to the Football League
2	Diagoras (P, Q)	24	16	6	2	42	9	+33	54	Qualification to promotion play-offs
3	Palliniakos	24	11	7	6	36	23	+13	40	
4	Diagoras Vrachnaiika	24	10	8	6	31	18	+13	38	
5	PAO Varda	24	10	7	7	31	26	+5	37	
6	Thyella Rafina	24	9	7	8	25	20	+5	34	
7	Paniliakos	24	8	8	8	32	26	+6	32	
8	Acharnaikos	24	8	7	9	25	17	+8	31	
9	Niki Tragano (R)	24	6	10	8	25	33	−8	28	Relegation to FCA championships
10	Panegialios (R)	24	6	9	9	25	36	−11	27	Relegation to FCA championships
11	Panmovriakos (R)	24	4	9	11	21	36	−15	21	Relegation to FCA championships
12	Phoebus Kremasti (R)	24	3	7	14	11	36	−25	16	Relegation to FCA championships
13	Asteras Amaliada (R)	24	0	3	21	4	70	−66	3	Relegation to FCA championships

Source: Hellenic Football Federation (in Greek)
Rules for classification: 1) points; 2) head-to-head points; 3) head-to-head goal difference.
(C) Champions; (P) Promoted; (Q) Qualified for the phase indicated; (R) Relegated

== Group 7 ==
=== Teams ===
Locations of the 2018–19 Gamma Ethniki Group 7 clubs

Team	Location	Last season
Chalkida	Chalkida	Group 7, 2nd
Panthiraikos	Santorini	Group 7, 3rd
Aiolikos	Mytilene	Group 7, 5th
Egaleo	Egaleo	Group 8, 2nd
Ilisiakos	Zografou	Group 8, 4th
Agios Ierotheos	Peristeri	Group 8, 7th
Kallithea	Kallithea	Football League, 16th
Agioi Anargyroi	Agioi Anargyroi	Athens FCA champion Group A
Charaviakos	Ilioupoli	Athens FCA champion Group B
Apollon Eretria	Eretria	Euboea FCA champion
PAS Korinthos	Corinth	Corinthia FCA champion
Thyella Kamari	Kamari	Cyclades FCA champion

=== Standings ===
Pos	Team	Pld	W	D	L	GF	GA	GD	Pts	Promotion or relegation
1	Egaleo (C, P)	22	18	2	2	42	14	+28	56	Promotion to the Football League
2	Aiolikos (Q)	22	12	4	6	32	18	+14	40	Qualification to promotion play-offs
3	Ilisiakos	22	10	8	4	26	17	+9	38	
4	Panthiraikos	22	8	10	4	28	19	+9	34	
5	Agioi Anargyroi	22	7	10	5	27	23	+4	31	
6	Agios Ierotheos	22	8	6	8	35	28	+7	30	
7	Kallithea	22	5	12	5	23	15	+8	27	
8	Thyella Kamari	22	6	8	8	27	26	+1	26	
9	Charavgiakos (R)	22	7	5	10	20	20	0	26	Relegation to FCA championships
10	Chalkida (R)	22	6	4	12	13	27	−14	22	Relegation to FCA championships
11	PAS Korinthos (R)	22	4	6	12	16	37	−21	18	Relegation to FCA championships
12	Apollon Eretria (R)	22	2	3	17	14	59	−45	9	Relegation to FCA championships

Source: Hellenic Football Federation (in Greek)
Rules for classification: 1) points; 2) head-to-head points; 3) head-to-head goal difference.
(C) Champions; (P) Promoted; (Q) Qualified for the phase indicated; (R) Relegated

== Group 8 ==
=== Teams ===
Locations of the 2018–19 Gamma Ethniki Group 8 clubs

Team	Location	Last season
Kalamata	Kalamata	Group 5, 5th
Asteras Vlachioti	Vlachioti	Group 5, 2nd
Panarkadikos	Tripoli	Group 5, 4th
APO Amvrysseas	Distomo	Group 4, 6th
Enosi Panaspropyrgiakou Doxas	Aspropyrgos	Group 6, 6th
Enosi Ermionida	Kranidi	Group 7, 4th
Panargiakos	Argos	Group 7, 7th
AOK Zakynthos	Katastari	Zakynthos FCA champion
AO Eikosimias	Vlachata	Kefalonia-Ithaca FCA champion
Pamisos Messini	Messini	Messinia FCA champion
AE Pellana	Pellana	Laconia FCA champion
Enosi Lerna	Lerna	Argolis FCA champion
Mandraikos	Mandra	West Attica FCA champion
AO Ypato	Ypato	Boeotia FCA champion

=== Standings ===
Pos	Team	Pld	W	D	L	GF	GA	GD	Pts	Promotion or relegation
1	Enosi Panaspropyrgiakou Doxas (C, P)	26	21	3	2	67	10	+57	66	Promotion to the Football League
2	Kalamata (Q)	26	20	3	3	45	12	+33	63	Qualification to promotion play-offs
3	Panargiakos	26	18	3	5	49	12	+37	57	
4	AO Ypato	26	12	6	8	34	14	+20	42	
5	Enosi Ermionida	26	11	7	8	31	25	+6	40	
6	AE Pellana	26	10	10	6	30	21	+9	40	
7	AOK Zakynthos	26	10	8	8	38	26	+12	38	
8	Asteras Vlachioti	26	11	4	11	30	44	−14	37	
9	Panarkadikos	26	9	8	9	37	34	+3	35	
10	APO Amvrysseas (R)	26	9	6	11	36	29	+7	33	Relegation to FCA championships
11	Mandraikos (R)	26	6	7	13	27	40	−13	25	Relegation to FCA championships
12	Enosi Lerna (R)	26	5	3	18	17	40	−23	18	Relegation to FCA championships
13	Pamisos Messini (R)	26	3	3	20	13	60	−47	12	Relegation to FCA championships
14	AO Eikosimias (R)	26	0	3	23	4	91	−87	3	Relegation to FCA championships

Source: Hellenic Football Federation (in Greek)
Rules for classification: 1) points; 2) head-to-head points; 3) head-to-head goal difference.
(C) Champions; (P) Promoted; (Q) Qualified for the phase indicated; (R) Relegated

== Promotional Play off ==
First leg will be played on 5 May the second leg on 12 May.

Team 1	Agg.	Team 2	1st leg	2nd leg
Triglia	1–0	Nestos Chrysoupoli	0–0	1–0
Niki Volos	0–3	Thesprotos	0–1	0–2
Diagoras	2–2	Kalamata	1–0	1–2
Aiolikos	2–4	Ionikos	2–2	0–2
