= 2019–20 Gamma Ethniki =

Gamma Ethniki
- Season: 2019–20
- Dates: 21 September 2019 – 29 April 2020

The 2019–20 Gamma Ethniki was the 37th season since the official establishment of the championship in 1983, but the 1st season as the fourth tier of the Greek Football. It will start on 22 September 2019. After the finish of the eight groups, the first team of each group will qualify for a playoff round of two groups, to determine which two teams will be promoted to Football League.

106 teams are divided into eight groups according to geographical criteria.

Only for Group 8 after the end of the regular season will be held play-off and play-out games. The top four teams will participate in the play-off round and the first team will be the champion of the group and will be qualifying to 2019–20 Gamma Ethniki play-offs second group. The last five teams will participate in play-out games and the last will be relegated.

Iraklis, Aiginiakos, Sparta, Alexandros Kilkis, Orestis Orestiada, Megas Alexandros Iasmos, and AOK Zakynthos withdrew from the league before the group draw.

== Effects of the 2020 coronavirus pandemic ==
On 29 April 2020 the HFF announced their decision to end the championship of Gamma Ethniki.

- The ranking on 8 March 2020 is the final ranking and every first team of each group will be champions.
- There will be future decision about the promotion/relegation.
- The promotion play-offs among the group champions will not be held.

== Group 1 ==
=== Teams ===
Location of teams in Group 1 of 2019–20 Gamma Ethniki

Team	Location	Last season
Nestos Chrysoupoli	Chrysoupoli	Group 1, 2nd
Panserraikos	Serres	Group 1, 3rd
Apollon Paralimnio	Paralimnio	Group 1, 4th
Aetos Orfano	Ofrynio	Group 1, 5th
Orfeas Xanthi	Xanthi	Group 1, 6th
Aris Avato	Avato	Group 1, 7th
Keravnos Perni	Perni	Group 1, 9th
Alexandroupoli	Alexandroupoli	Evros FCA 2nd
Iraklis Neos Zygos	Neos Zygos	Xanthi FCA champion
Doxa Theologos	Theologos	Kavala FCA champion
Doxa Kato Kamila	Kato Kamila	Serres FCA champion
Pandramaikos	Drama	Drama FCA champion
Kilkisiakos	Kilkis	Kilkis FCA champion

=== Standings ===
Pos	Team	Pld	W	D	L	GF	GA	GD	Pts	Promotion or relegation
1	Panserraikos (C, P)	22	18	4	0	65	13	+52	58	Promotion to the Football League
2	Nestos Chrysoupoli	22	14	2	6	34	28	+6	44	
3	Apollon Paralimnio	21	11	7	3	31	17	+14	40	
4	Aetos Orfano	22	11	5	6	41	22	+19	38	
5	Pandramaikos	21	11	4	6	30	20	+10	37	
6	Aris Avato	21	9	7	5	32	22	+10	34	
7	Doxa Kato Kamila	21	10	3	8	38	27	+11	33	
8	Alexandroupoli	21	9	3	9	20	24	−4	30	
9	Orfeas Xanthi	21	7	5	9	23	35	−12	26	
10	Keravnos Perni (R)	21	3	6	12	26	52	−26	15	Relegation to FCA championships
11	Kilkisiakos (R)	21	4	1	16	20	49	−29	13	Relegation to FCA championships
12	Iraklis Neos Zygos (R)	21	2	4	15	12	30	−18	10	Relegation to FCA championships
13	Doxa Theologos (R)	21	2	3	16	12	45	−33	9	Relegation to FCA championships

Source: Hellenic Football Federation (in Greek)
Rules for classification: 1) points; 2) head-to-head points; 3) head-to-head goal difference.
(C) Champions; (P) Promoted; (R) Relegated

== Group 2 ==
=== Teams ===
Location of teams in Group 2 of 2019–20 Gamma Ethniki

Team	Location	Last season
Niki Agathia	Agkathia	Group 2, 3rd
~~Aris Palaiochori~~	~~Palaiochori~~	~~Group 2, 4th~~
Edessaikos	Edessa	Group 2, 5th
Almopos Aridea	Aridaea	Group 2, 6th
Anagennisi Giannitsa	Giannitsa	Group 2, 7th as Giannitsa FC
Makedonikos	Efkarpia	Group 2, 8th
Agrotikos Asteras	Evosmos	Group 2, 9th
Poseidon Nea Michaniona	Michaniona	Macedonia FCA champion
Thermaikos	Thermi	Macedonia FCA 2nd
Thyella Sarakinoi	Sarakinoi	Pella FCA champion
Florina	Florina	Florina FCA champion
Nea Kallikrateia	Kallikrateia	Chalkidiki FCA Champion
Megas Alexandros Trikala	Langadas	Imathia FCA champion
~~AO Sirina~~	~~Grevena~~	~~Grevena FCA champion~~
Astrapi Mesopotamia	Mesopotamia	Kastoria FCA champion

=== Standings ===
Pos	Team	Pld	W	D	L	GF	GA	GD	Pts	Promotion or relegation
1	Almopos Aridea (C, P)	25	19	4	2	56	10	+46	61	Promotion to the Football League
2	Poseidon Nea Michaniona	25	14	4	7	44	26	+18	46	
3	Anagennisi Giannitsa	25	13	7	5	34	17	+17	46	
4	Makedonikos	25	12	9	4	31	8	+23	45	
5	Edessaikos	26	12	9	5	38	15	+23	45	
6	Thermaikos	25	13	4	8	40	21	+19	43	
7	Thyella Sarakinoi	25	13	3	9	37	28	+9	42	
8	Agrotikos Asteras (Note: Agrotikos Asteras has 1 points deducted, from the HFF.)	25	11	7	7	34	20	+14	39	
9	Megas Alexandros Trikala	26	10	9	7	25	20	+5	39	
10	Nea Kallikrateia	25	10	8	7	36	19	+17	38	
11	Niki Agathia	25	10	6	9	29	19	+10	36	
12	Pas Florina (R)	25	8	5	12	27	41	−14	29	Relegation to FCA championships
13	Astrapi Mesopotamia (R)	25	4	1	20	15	58	−43	13	Relegation to FCA championships
14	AO Sirina (Note: AO Sirina has 6 points deducted, and withdrew from the league after the 8th round.) (D)	25	1	0	24	4	79	−75	−6	Relegation to FCA championships
15	Aris Palaiochori (Note: Aris Palaiochori withdrew from the league before the start of season.) (D)	24	0	0	24	0	72	−72	−9	Relegation to FCA championships

Source: Hellenic Football Federation (in Greek)
Rules for classification: 1) points; 2) head-to-head points; 3) head-to-head goal difference.
(C) Champions; (D) Disqualified; (P) Promoted; (R) Relegated

== Group 3 ==
=== Teams ===
Location of teams in Group 3 of 2019–20 Gamma Ethniki

Team	Location	Last season
Meteora	Meteora	Group 4, 4th
Almyros	Almyros	Group 4, 5th
AO Sellana	Sellana	Group 4, 6th
Pierikos	Katerini	Group 4, 7th
Theseus Agria	Agria	Group 4, 8th
Oikonomos Tsaritsani	Tsaritsani	Group 4, 9th
A.P.O. Atalanti	Atalanti	Phthiotis FCA champion
AE Karitsa	Karitsa	Pieria FCA champion
Dias Dion	Dion	Pieria FCA 2nd
Diagoras Stefanovikeio	Stefanovikeio	Thessaly FCA champion
Digenis Neochori	Neochori	Trikala FCA champion
Atromitos Palamas	Palamas	Karditsa FCA champion
AO Potamia Megalo Chorio	Megalo Chorio	Evrytania FCA champion
Iraklis Larissa	Larissa	Larissa FCA champion

=== Standings ===
Pos	Team	Pld	W	D	L	GF	GA	GD	Pts	Promotion or relegation
1	Pierikos (C, P)	23	17	5	1	45	6	+39	56	Promotion to the Football League
2	Theseus Agria	23	14	1	8	46	31	+15	43	
3	AE Karitsa	23	11	8	4	39	16	+23	41	
4	Iraklis Larissa	23	12	4	7	33	26	+7	40	
5	Atromitos Palamas	23	10	6	7	26	21	+5	36	
6	Almyros	23	10	5	8	25	20	+5	35	
7	AO Sellana	23	8	9	6	23	23	0	33	
8	A.P.O. Atalanti	23	10	2	11	29	34	−5	32	
9	Diagoras Stefanovikeio	23	7	7	9	22	27	−5	28	
10	Meteora	23	7	7	9	25	24	+1	28	
11	Oikonomos Tsaritsani	23	6	8	9	19	26	−7	26	
12	Dias Dion	23	8	1	14	18	37	−19	25	
13	Digenis Neochori (R)	23	5	7	11	31	41	−10	22	Relegation to FCA championships
14	AO Potamia Megalo Chorio (R)	23	0	2	21	7	56	−49	2	Relegation to FCA championships

Source: Hellenic Football Federation (in Greek)
Rules for classification: 1) points; 2) head-to-head points; 3) head-to-head goal difference.
(C) Champions; (P) Promoted; (R) Relegated

== Group 4 ==
=== Teams ===
Location of teams in Group 4 of 2019–20 Gamma Ethniki

Team	Location	Last season
PAS Acheron Kanallaki	Kanallaki	Group 3, 3rd
Makedonikos Foufas	Foufas	Group 3, 4th
A.E. Lefkimmi	Lefkimmi	Group 3, 5th
Nafpaktiakos Asteras	Nafpaktos	Group 3, 6th
Souli Paramythia	Paramythia	Group 3, 7th
Tilikratis	Lefkada	Group 3, 8th
~~Asteras Itea~~	~~Itea~~	~~Group 4, 3rd~~
AO Anatoli	Anatoli	Epirus FCA champion
AEP Karagiannia	Karagiannia	Kozani FCA champion
Anagennisi Arta	Arta	Arta FCA champion
Thinaliakos	Acharavi	Kerkyra FCA champion
AE Messolonghi	Messolonghi	Aetoloacarnania FCA champion
Apollon Efpalio	Efpalio	Phocis FCA champion
PAS Preveza	Preveza	Preveza-Lefkada FCA champion

=== Standings ===
Pos	Team	Pld	W	D	L	GF	GA	GD	Pts	Promotion or relegation
1	AEP Karagiannia (C, P)	23	16	5	2	40	15	+25	53	Promotion to the Football League
2	Anagennisi Arta	23	16	3	4	42	18	+24	51	
3	Souli Paramythia	23	12	5	6	26	22	+4	41	
4	Acheron Kanallaki	23	11	7	5	31	17	+14	40	
5	Tilikratis	23	9	9	5	32	18	+14	36	
6	Thinaliakos	23	11	3	9	26	17	+9	36	
7	AE Messolonghi	23	9	3	11	32	26	+6	30	
8	Anatoli	23	8	6	9	29	30	−1	30	
9	Makedonikos Foufas	23	8	6	9	24	25	−1	30	
10	Lefkimmi	23	7	8	8	20	22	−2	29	
11	Preveza	23	5	10	8	17	25	−8	25	
12	Nafpaktiakos Asteras	23	6	3	14	17	40	−23	21	
13	Apollon Efpalio (R)	23	3	5	15	23	42	−19	14	Relegation to FCA championships
14	Asteras Itea (Note: Asteras Itea has 9 points deducted, the team left after the 12th round.) (R)	23	2	3	18	11	53	−42	0	Relegation to FCA championships

Source: Hellenic Football Federation (in Greek)
Rules for classification: 1) points; 2) head-to-head points; 3) head-to-head goal difference.
(C) Champions; (P) Promoted; (R) Relegated

== Group 5 ==
=== Teams ===
Location of teams in Group 5 of 2019–20 Gamma Ethniki

Team	Location	Last season
Ilisiakos	Zografou	Group 7, 3rd
Panthiraikos	Santorini	Group 7, 4th
Agioi Anargyroi	Agioi Anargyroi	Group 7, 5th
Agios Ierotheos	Peristeri	Group 7, 6th
Kallithea	Kallithea	Group 7, 7th
Thyella Kamari	Kamari	Group 7, 8th
Ethnikos Piraeus	Piraeus	Group 5, 3rd
Keratsini	Keratsini	Group 5, 8th
AE Kifisia	Kifisia	Athens FCA champion Group A
Fostiras	Tavros	Athens FCA champion Group B
AE Moschato	Moschato	Piraeus FCA champion Group A
Ermis Korydallos	Korydallos	Piraeus FCA champion Group B
Akratitos	Ano Liosia	West Attica FCA champion
Ano Mera Mykonos	Mykonos	Cyclades FCA champion

=== Standings ===
Pos	Team	Pld	W	D	L	GF	GA	GD	Pts	Promotion or relegation
1	Kallithea (C, P)	23	16	5	2	38	15	+23	53	Promotion to the Football League
2	Thyella Kamari (P)	23	17	2	4	46	18	+28	53	Promotion to the Football League
3	Fostiras	23	11	7	5	36	21	+15	40	
4	Agios Ierotheos	23	11	6	6	30	27	+3	39	
5	AE Kifisia	23	11	3	9	26	22	+4	36	
6	Panthiraikos	23	9	8	6	22	17	+5	35	
7	AE Moschato	23	10	5	8	40	29	+11	35	
8	Ethnikos Piraeus	23	8	7	8	26	24	+2	31	
9	Keratsini	23	7	8	8	18	25	−7	29	
10	Ano Mera Mykonos	23	7	6	10	15	17	−2	27	
11	Akratitos	23	5	6	12	20	36	−16	21	
12	Ilisiakos (R)	23	3	9	11	17	32	−15	18	Relegation to FCA championships
13	Agioi Anargyroi (R)	23	2	7	14	14	34	−20	13	Relegation to FCA championships
14	Ermis Korydallos (R)	23	2	5	16	19	50	−31	11	Relegation to FCA championships

Source: Hellenic Football Federation (in Greek)
Rules for classification: 1) points; 2) head-to-head points; 3) head-to-head goal difference.
(C) Champions; (P) Promoted; (R) Relegated

== Group 6 ==
=== Teams ===
Location of teams in Group 6 of 2019–20 Gamma Ethniki

Team	Location	Last season
Palliniakos	Pallini	Group 6, 3rd
Thyella Rafina	Rafina (Diastavrosi neighborhood)	Group 6, 6th
Acharnaikos	Acharnes	Group 6, 8th
Aiolikos	Mytilene	Group 7, 2nd
AO Ypato	Ypato	Group 8, 4th
Panarkadikos	Tripoli	Group 8, 9th
Aittitos Spata	Spata	FL, 14th
Rodos	Rhodes	Dodecanese FCA champion
Marko	Markopoulo	East Attica FCA champion
PAS Kithairon Kaparelli	Kaparelli	Boeotia FCA champion
AO Nea Artaki	Nea Artaki	Euboea FCA champion
AEK Tripoli	Tripoli	Arcadia FCA champion
Korinthos 2006	Corinth	Corinthia FCA champion

=== Standings ===
Pos	Team	Pld	W	D	L	GF	GA	GD	Pts	Promotion or relegation
1	Rodos (C, P)	21	18	2	1	44	9	+35	56	Promotion to the Football League
2	Marko	21	13	5	3	37	15	+22	44	
3	AO Ypato	22	10	7	5	33	19	+14	37	
4	Panarkadikos	21	11	3	7	30	18	+12	36	
5	Aittitos Spata	21	10	5	6	26	21	+5	35	
6	Thyella Rafina	21	9	7	5	21	18	+3	34	
7	Aiolikos	21	8	5	8	25	18	+7	29	
8	PAS Kithairon Kaparelli	21	8	5	8	19	17	+2	29	
9	AO Nea Artaki	21	7	6	8	22	22	0	27	
10	Palliniakos (R)	22	5	7	10	20	31	−11	22	Relegation to FCA championships
11	Acharnaikos (R)	21	5	1	15	16	33	−17	16	Relegation to FCA championships
12	Korinthos 2006 (R)	21	4	3	14	14	47	−33	15	Relegation to FCA championships
13	AEK Tripoli (R)	22	0	4	18	8	47	−39	4	Relegation to FCA championships

Source: Hellenic Football Federation (in Greek)
Rules for classification: 1) points; 2) head-to-head points; 3) head-to-head goal difference.
(C) Champions; (P) Promoted; (R) Relegated

== Group 7 ==
=== Teams ===
Location of teams in Group 7 of 2019–20 Gamma Ethniki

Team	Location	Last season
Diagoras Vrachnaiika	Vrachnaiika	Group 6, 4th
PAO Varda	Varda	Group 6, 5th
Paniliakos	Pyrgos	Group 6, 7th
Panargiakos	Argos	Group 8, 3rd
Sparti	Sparta	Group 8, 5th as A.E. Pellana
Enosi Ermionida	Kranidi	Group 8, 6th
Asteras Vlachioti	Vlachioti	Group 8, 8th
AO Tsilivi	Planos	Zakynthos FCA champion
Zakynthos	Zakynthos	Zakynthos FCA 2nd
AO Diavolitsi	Diavolitsi	Messinia FCA champion
Nafplio 2017	Nafplio	Argolis FCA champion
Olympiakos Zacharo	Zacharo	Elis FCA champion
Pangytheatikos	Gytheio	Laconia FCA champion
Thyella Patras	Patras	Achaea FCA champion

=== Standings ===
Pos	Team	Pld	W	D	L	GF	GA	GD	Pts	Promotion or relegation
1	Asteras Vlachioti (C, P)	23	16	4	3	38	10	+28	52	Promotion to the Football League
2	Sparti	23	14	6	3	31	14	+17	48	
3	Nafplio 2017	22	12	2	8	35	28	+7	38	
4	Zakynthos	22	11	5	6	27	21	+6	38	
5	Enosi Ermionida	22	10	5	7	38	24	+14	35	
6	PAO Varda	22	9	6	7	26	25	+1	33	
7	AO Tsilivi	22	9	5	8	33	30	+3	32	
8	AO Diavolitsi	23	8	6	9	28	26	+2	30	
9	Thyella Patras	23	9	2	12	32	35	−3	29	
10	Diagoras Vrachnaiika	22	8	4	10	23	27	−4	28	
11	Pangytheatikos	23	6	4	13	16	30	−14	22	
12	Panargiakos (R)	23	4	7	12	15	33	−18	19	Relegation to FCA championships
13	Olympiakos Zacharo (R)	23	5	4	14	18	39	−21	19	Relegation to FCA championships
14	Paniliakos (R)	23	4	6	13	12	30	−18	18	Relegation to FCA championships

Source: Hellenic Football Federation (in Greek)
Rules for classification: 1) points; 2) head-to-head points; 3) head-to-head goal difference.
(C) Champions; (P) Promoted; (R) Relegated

== Group 8 ==
=== Teams ===
Location of teams in Group 8 of 2019–20 Gamma Ethniki

Team	Location	Last season
Episkopi	Episkopi	Group 5, 4th
Giouchtas	Archanes	Group 5, 5th
AEEK SYN.KA	Chania	Group 5, 6th
Atsalenios	Heraklion (Atsalenio neighborhood)	Group 5, 7th
Irodotos	Heraklion (Nea Alikarnassos neighborhood)	FL, 13th
Poros	Heraklion (Poros neighborhood)	Heraklion FCA champion
AO Agios Nikolaos	Agios Nikolaos	Lasithi FCA champion
Rethymniakos	Rethymno	Rethymno FCA champion
Panakrotiriakos	Akrotiri	Chania FCA champion

=== Standings ===
Pos	Team	Pld	W	D	L	GF	GA	GD	Pts	Qualification
1	Episkopi (Q)	16	11	5	0	33	10	+23	38	Qualification to Group 8 play-offs
2	Giouchtas (Q)	16	9	4	3	27	15	+12	31	Qualification to Group 8 play-offs
3	Irodotos (Q)	16	7	4	5	18	13	+5	25	Qualification to Group 8 play-offs
4	Panakrotiriakos (Q)	16	6	5	5	22	18	+4	23	Qualification to Group 8 play-offs
5	AO Agios Nikolaos (Q)	16	5	3	8	18	25	−7	18	Qualification to Group 8 play-out
6	Atsalenios (Q)	16	3	8	5	14	18	−4	17	Qualification to Group 8 play-out
7	AEEK SYN.KA (Q)	16	4	5	7	14	19	−5	17	Qualification to Group 8 play-out
8	Poros (Q)	16	4	2	10	15	28	−13	14	Qualification to Group 8 play-out
9	Rethymniakos (Q)	16	3	4	9	15	30	−15	13	Qualification to Group 8 play-out

Source: Hellenic Football Federation (in Greek)
Rules for classification: 1) points; 2) head-to-head points; 3) head-to-head goal difference.
(Q) Qualified for the phase indicated

=== Group 8 play-offs ===
Pos	Team	Pld	W	D	L	GF	GA	GD	Pts	Promotion
1	Episkopi (C, P)	19	12	6	1	36	13	+23	42	Promotion to the Football League
2	Giouchtas	19	10	5	4	31	19	+12	35	
3	Irodotos	19	8	6	5	23	17	+6	30	
4	Panakrotiriakos	19	7	5	7	24	21	+3	26	

Source: Hellenic Football Federation
(C) Champions; (P) Promoted

=== Group 8 play-out ===
Pos	Team	Pld	W	D	L	GF	GA	GD	Pts
1	Atsalenios	19	5	8	6	17	19	−2	23
2	AO Agios Nikolaos	18	6	4	8	20	26	−6	22
3	AEEK SYN.KA	18	5	5	8	16	21	−5	20
4	Poros	19	4	4	11	17	31	−14	16
5	Rethymniakos	18	3	5	10	17	34	−17	14

Source: Hellenic Football Federation

== Promotion Playoffs ==
- The promotion play-offs among the group champions will not be held.
