= 2019–20 Football League (Greece) =

Football League Greece
- Season: 2019–20
- Dates: 28 September 2019 – 8 March 2020
- Champions: Trikala
- Promoted: Trikala; Ionikos; Diagoras Rodos; Ierapetra
- Relegated: none
- Matches: 160
- Goals: 319 (1.99 per match)
- Top goalscorer: Stelios Kritikos (13 goals)
- Biggest home win: Ialysos Rodos 4–0 Olympiacos Volos (16 February 2020)
- Biggest away win: Aspropyrgos 0–3 Diagoras (22 December 2019)
- Highest scoring: Thesprotos 2–4 Veria (23 February 2020)
- Longest winning run: Trikala (6 matches)
- Longest unbeaten run: Trikala (12 matches)
- Longest winless run: Kalamata (13 matches)
- Longest losing run: Kalamata (5 matches)
- All statistics correct as of 8 March 2020.

The 2019–20 Football League Greece was the first season as a third-tier professional league of the Greek football league system since its restructuring and the ninth season under the name Football League after previously being known as Beta Ethniki. This year the participating teams were reduced from 16 to 14. On 2 June 2020, the season was officially ended due to the COVID-19 pandemic with Trikala announced as champions.

== Teams ==
Locations of the 2019–20 Football League clubs

Club	Finishing position last season	Location	Stadium	Capacity
Aspropyrgos	Gamma Ethniki (Group 8), 1st	Aspropyrgos	Aspropyrgos Municipal Stadium	2,000
Diagoras Rodos	Gamma Ethniki (Group 6), 2nd	Rhodes	Diagoras Stadium	3,693
Egaleo	Gamma Ethniki (Group 7), 1st	Egaleo	Stavros Mavrothalassitis Stadium	8,217
Ialysos Rodos	Gamma Ethniki (Group 6), 1st	Ialysos	Economideio Municipal Stadium	2,000
Ierapetra	Gamma Ethniki (Group 5), 1st	Ierapetra	Petros Vouzounerakis Stadium	3,000
Ionikos	Gamma Ethniki (Group 5), 2nd	Nikaia	Neapoli Stadium	6,000
Kalamata	Gamma Ethniki (Group 8), 2nd	Kalamata	Kalamata Municipal Stadium	5,613
Kavala	Gamma Ethniki (Group 1), 1st	Kavala	Anthi Karagianni Stadium	10,550
Niki Volos	Gamma Ethniki (Group 4), 2nd	Volos	Neapoli Volos Municipal Stadium	2,500
Olympiacos Volos	Gamma Ethniki (Group 4), 1st	Volos	Neapoli Volos Municipal Stadium	2,500
Thesprotos	Gamma Ethniki (Group 3), 2nd	Igoumenitsa	Igoumenitsa Municipal Stadium	3,500
Triglia	Gamma Ethniki (Group 2), 2nd	Triglia	Triglia Municipal Stadium	5,000
Trikala	Football League 2018–19, 12th	Trikala	Trikala Municipal Stadium	15,000
Veria	Gamma Ethniki (Group 2), 1st	Veria	Veria Stadium	7,000

- Niki Volos and Kalamata were accepted to play in the Football League by decision of the HFF, taking the place of Iraklis and Nestos Chrysoupoli, who withdrew its participation.
- Trikala placed 12th in the 2018–19 Football League, thus becoming ineligible to play in the Super League 2, the country's newly founded Second Division.

== Personnel and sponsoring ==
Team	Manager	Captain	Kit manufacturer	Sponsor
Aspropyrgos	(Greece) Georgios Vazakas	(Greece) Panagiotis Zonas	Zeus	Tzoudas S.A
Diagoras Rodos	(Greece) Petros Routzieris	(Greece) Stathis Provatidis	Macron	N/A
Egaleo	(Greece) Thomas Grafas	(Greece) Ilias Tsiligiris	Macron	Kyriakoulis
Ialysos Rodos	(Greece) Nikos Pantelis	(Greece) Dionysis Makrydimitris	Umbro	Aplos Fresko
Ierapetra	(Greece) Timos Kavakas	(Greece) Giannis Tzelepis	Macron	Chrissi Daily Cruises
Ionikos	(Greece) Apostolos Charalampidis	(Greece) Giannis Gotsoulias	Nike	Agioutantis Group
Kalamata	(Greece) Nikos Anastopoulos	(Greece) Grigoris Makos	Capelli	Volterra
Kavala	(Greece) Pavlos Dermitzakis	(Greece) Vasilis Gavriilidis	Macron	Ellagrolip
Niki Volos	(Greece) Staikos Vergetis	(Greece) Manolis Apostolidis	Macron	Car.gr
Olympiacos Volos	(Greece) Ilias Solakis	(Greece) Nikos Boutzikos	Nike	N/A
Thesprotos	(Argentina) Juan Ramón Rocha	(Greece) Christos Nonis	Luanvi	Car.gr
Triglia	(Greece) Giannis Pollaetidis	(Greece) Giannis Milkoudis	Macron	N/A
Trikala	(Greece) Periklis Amanatidis	(Greece) Pantelis Rizogiannis	Givova	Autodeal
Veria	(Greece) Kostas Georgiadis	(Greece) Alexandros Vergonis	GSA Sport	thefoodballer

== League table ==
Pos	Team	Pld	W	D	L	GF	GA	GD	Pts	Promotion or relegation
1	Trikala (C, P)	23	13	7	3	28	14	+14	46	Promotion to the Super League 2
2	Ionikos (P)	23	11	7	5	26	13	+13	40	Promotion to the Super League 2
3	Diagoras Rodos (Note: Diagoras replacing Platanias in Super League 2.) (P)	23	10	8	5	27	15	+12	38	Promotion to the Super League 2
4	Ierapetra (Note: Ierapetra replacing Panionios in Super League 2.) (P)	23	10	7	6	23	19	+4	37	Promotion to the Super League 2
5	Niki Volos	23	10	7	6	27	20	+7	37	
6	Kavala	23	9	9	5	23	12	+11	36	
7	Veria (Note: Veria has 3 points deducted, from the HFF.)	23	9	7	7	27	21	+6	31	
8	Olympiacos Volos	23	8	7	8	28	32	−4	31	
9	Egaleo	23	7	6	10	14	22	−8	27	
10	Thesprotos	23	7	3	13	26	33	−7	24	
11	Aspropyrgos	23	5	9	9	23	32	−9	24	
12	Ialysos Rodos	23	6	6	11	17	28	−11	24	
13	Kalamata	23	6	3	14	19	27	−8	21	
14	Triglia	23	4	6	13	16	35	−19	18	

Source: sl2fl.gr
Rules for classification: 1) Points; 2) Goals scored; 3) Head-to-head goal difference; 4) Head-to-head points; 5) Goals against; 6) Play-offs (neutral ground, only used if needed to decide teams for promotion or relegation).
(C) Champions; (P) Promoted

=== Results ===
Home \ Away	TRI	ION	DIA	OFI	NVL	KAV	VER	OLV	EGA	THE	EAS	IAL	KAL	TRG
Trikala	—	1–0	0–1	3–0	—	0–0	2–1	1–1	2–1	2–1	1–0	3–0	—	2–0
Ionikos	0–0	—	3–2	0–1	2–0	—	0–0	2–0	3–0	1–1	2–0	1–0	1–0	2–0
Diagoras	1–2	1–0	—	0–0	1–1	0–0	0–1	0–0	1–0	4–1	—	3–1	2–0	—
Ierapetra	0–1	0–0	0–0	—	2–1	3–2	0–1	1–3	0–0	1–0	1–0	3–0 (Note: The game awarded a 3–0 w/o win to Ierapetra.)	—	3–0
Niki Volos	2–0	1–2	2–1	0–0	—	2–0	—	2–0	1–1	2–1	3–0	2–0	1–1	2–2
Kavala	0–0	0–0	—	0–0	0–1	—	1–0	2–0	0–0	4–1	0–0	3–0	2–1	4–1
Veria	1–1	—	0–0	1–2	3–0	0–2	—	1–0	3–1	1–1	1–1	—	2–0	2–1
Olympiacos Volos	2–2	1–1	0–1	2–1	1–1	—	0–2	—	—	1–1	4–1	2–0	2–1	3–1
Egaleo	1–0	1–2	0–2	—	2–0	0–0	1–0	0–1	—	1–0	0–2	1–0	0–2	1–1
Thesprotos	1–2	0–2	1–2	—	0–1	1–0	2–4	4–1	0–1	—	1–0	—	3–1	3–0
Aspropyrgos	1–1	—	0–3	3–0	—	1–0	2–2	2–2	1–1	1–2	—	1–0	1–0	2–2
Ialysos Rodos	—	2–2	1–1	0–0	1–0	0–0	1–0	4–0	1–0	1–0	2–2	—	0–0	1–2
Kalamata	0–1	1–0	1–0	2–3	0–2	0–1	3–0 (Note: The game awarded a 3–0 w/o win to Kalamata.)	1–2	0–1	—	2–2	2–0	—	1–0
Triglia	0–1	1–0	1–1	0–2	0–0	1–2	0–0	—	—	0–1	2–0	0–2	1–0	—

Source: sl2fl.gr
Legend: Blue = home team win; Yellow = draw; Red = away team win.

== Top scorers ==
As of 1 March 2020

Rank	Player	Club	Goals
1	(Greece) Stelios Kritikos	Ionikos	13
2	(Greece) Giannis Pasas	Veria	10
3	(Argentina) Antonio Rojano	Niki Volos	8
4	(Greece) Christos Kollas	Thesprotos	7
4	(Greece) Georgios Barbarousis	Diagoras Rodos	7
4	(Argentina) Mauro Dalla Costa	Thesprotos	7
7	(Greece) Andreas Stamatis	Trikala	6
7	(Greece) Pantelis Rizogiannis	Trikala	6
7	(Albania) Florenc Keri	Diagoras / Olympiacos Volos	6
7	(Greece) Thomas Tsitas	Olympiacos Volos	6
7	(Greece) Stelios Pozoglou	Olympiacos Volos / Veria	6
12	(Greece) Aristidis Lottas	Trikala	5
12	(Ivory Coast) Brahima Koné	Ialysos Rodos	5
12	(Albania) Georgios Kakko	Aspropyrgos	5
12	(Greece) Ilias Tsiligiris	Egaleo	5
12	(Greece) Spyros Glynos	Diagoras Rodos	5
