= Apostolos Tsiolis =

Greek footballer

Personal information
- Date of birth: 10 December 1996 (age 29)
- Place of birth: Trikala, Greece
- Height: 1.77 m (5 ft 10 in)
- Position: Attacking midfielder

Youth career
- Asteras Tripolis

Senior career*
Years	Team	Apps	(Gls)
2013–2015	Asteras Tripolis	0	(0)
2015	AO Dimitra Apollon 2005		
2015–2016	Pierikos		
2016–2017	Loutraki		
2017	Mavroi Aetoi		
2017–2018	Rigas Feraios		
2018–2019	Almyros		
2019–2021	Niki Volos	18	(3)
2021–2023	Fostiras		
2023	Fiki		
2023–2024	Gyziakos		
- * Club domestic league appearances and goals as of 8 August 2021

Apostolos Tsiolis (Greek: Απόστολος Τσιώλης; born 10 December 1996) is a Greek professional footballer who plays as an attacking midfielder.
