= Nikos Bourganis =

Greek footballer (born 1997)

Personal information
- Full name: Nikolaos Bourganis
- Date of birth: 21 April 1997 (age 29)
- Place of birth: Agria, Volos, Greece
- Height: 1.89 m (6 ft 2 in)
- Position: Goalkeeper

Youth career
- 2011–2014: Theseus Agria
- 2014–2015: Niki Volos

Senior career*
Years	Team	Apps	(Gls)
2015–2016	Theseus Agria		
2016–2017	Olympiacos Volos	2	(0)
2017–2019	Volos	12	(0)
2019–2022	PAOK	0	(0)
2019–2021	→ Karaiskakis (loan)	16	(0)
2021–2022	PAOK B	12	(0)
2022–2024	Niki Volos	3	(0)
- * Club domestic league appearances and goals as of 13 June 2023

Nikos Bourganis (Greek: Νίκος Μπουργάνης; born 21 April 1997) is a Greek professional footballer who plays as a goalkeeper.

== Career ==
=== Early career ===
Nikolaos Bourganis has been at PAOK since 2019. He is a tall and comfortable with the ball at his feet and possesses reactions in one-on-one situations. He first became acquainted with the position of goalkeeper at the age of seven at Theseas Agrias, although he started out as a striker. At the age of 18 he went to Niki Volos, followed by Olympiacos Volos (making two appearances in the third tier), then Volos (26 appearances), where he remained after the team was promoted to the second tier. In 2019, PAOK entered his life and at the same time AE Karaiskakis – along with Chatzistravos and Meletidis – where in two seasons he played in 16 games. It's now time for him to wear the Double-headed Eagle on his chest for PAOK B.

== Honours ==
Volos

- Gamma Ethniki: 2017–18
- Football League: 2018–19
