= Rogério Martins =

Brazilian footballer

Personal information
- Full name: Rogério Gonçalves Martins
- Date of birth: November 19, 1984 (age 41)
- Place of birth: Uberaba, Brazil
- Height: 1.78 m (5 ft 10 in)
- Position: Attacking midfielder

Team information
- Current team: Pyrasos

Youth career
- Nacional de Uberaba

Senior career*
Years	Team	Apps	(Gls)
2005–2012	Asteras Tripolis	108	(15)
2008–2009	→ Ergotelis (loan)	24	(0)
2009–2010	→ Olympiacos Volos (loan)	31	(18)
2012–2014	Levadiakos	61	(9)
2014–2015	Niki Volos	10	(1)
2015–2016	Panthrakikos	25	(3)
2016–2017	Aris Limassol	33	(13)
2017–2018	Al-Oroba	0	(0)
2018	Egaleo	8	(0)
2018–2019	Doxa Drama	24	(3)
2019–2020	Egaleo	12	(1)
2020	Asteras Vlachioti	0	(0)
2021	Iraklis	9	(4)
2022–	Pyrasos		

Managerial career
- 2021–2022: Agia Paraskevi (youth)
- 2022–: Pyrasos (youth)
- * Club domestic league appearances and goals

Rogério Gonçalves Martins (born November 19, 1984) is a Brazilian footballer who currently plays for Pyrasos as an attacking midfielder.

== Career ==
In 2005, Rogério moved abroad to play football in Greece, joining third-tier club Asteras Tripolis F.C. By age 31, he had completed eleven seasons in Greek football, scoring 51 goals in 292 appearances in all competitions. Rogério's first Super League Greece goal came in 2007, a match-winner against Panathinaikos while playing for Asteras.

After Rogério retired from playing in 2021, he joined the training staff of Agia Paraskevi's youth academy. In March 2023, Martins returned to the pitch, signing with Pyrasos. In August 2022, it was confirmed that Martins, in addition to being an active player for the club, would also act as a coach in the club's academy in the future. In September 2023, 39-year old Martins signed a contract extension with the club.
