= Iraklis Volos F.C. =

Football club in Nea Ionia, Greece

Iraklis Volos
- Full name: Iraklis Volos Football Club
- Founded: 29 January 1932; 94 years ago
- Ground: Vasdekeio Stadium
- Chairman: Kostas Providas
- Manager: Apostolos Chalastaras
- League: Thessaly FCA Second Division
- 2025–26: Thessaly FCA Third Division, 2nd (promoted)
Home colours	Away colours

Iraklis Volos F.C. is a Greek football club, based in Nea Ionia, Magnesia, currently a part of the Thessaly Football Clubs Association. The club was founded in 1932. Before its official establishment, it was active as an unofficial union, being an annex-subsidiary team of Niki Volos. It played its first match as an unofficial association on 26 August 1928 against A.E. Nikomideias in a friendly match, winning it with a score of 1–0.

== History ==
=== Foundation – Pre-war Period ===
Football gained popularity in Volos after the arrival of the Asia Minor refugees in Volos and the subsequent establishment of Niki Volos in 1924. Niki Volos, as well as the other teams of Volos, in order to meet the interest of young people in sports, formed branches - subsidiary teams without legal recognition in which young footballers were tested. In the summer of 1928, Iraklis Volos was formed as an unofficial club - subsidiary team of Niki. Iraklis received its official status on 29 January 1932, when it was recognized by the Court of First Instance of Volos.

In the season 1932–33, the club made their first appearance in official championships, participating in the second division of the Thessaly FCA. They ended the season in third place behind PAOK Volos and Toxotis Volos. In the following season, Iraklis Volos were declared champions of the second division by the Greek Sports Association due to there being no other division competitors after mergers of some clubs and inactivity of others. In the following 1934–35 season, they participated in the first division of the Thessaly FCA in a championship that was interrupted without a champion team being declared.

Thessaly FCA restarted the official football activity after two years in the period 1937–38 by organizing a championship with the participation of 8 teams. Iraklis Volos finished in fifth place and together with the teams: Kentavros Volos, Odysseas Volos and PAEK Volos who occupied the sixth, seventh and eighth places respectively, formed the second division in the following season. In the seasons 1938–39 and 1939–40, they participated in the second division, finishing in second place both times.

The team was deactivated thereafter.

=== Reactivation ===
After the end of the Second World War and the Greek Civil war, Iraklis Volos was reactivated. The team participated in the championship of the second division of Thessaly FCA in the period 1951–52. The team's roster in the period 1951–52 consisted of the following players: Kalaitzis, Vranas (goalkeepers), Bogdanos D., Zanderiou V., Matthaiou E., Stamatiou S., Lazarou S., Kesmetzis D., Karvouniaris E., Levithakis M., Migas A., Lefakis I., Savridis E., Ventouras, Korinthios, Fatsis, Karagiannis, Maskas, Kesmetzis.

In the 1953–54 season, they were relegated to the third division, in which it remained for the next two years. In the 1955–56 season, they won the third division championship and faced Pileas Volos in a double qualification match. They won the match (7–2 away and 2–0 at home without match), thus gaining promotion back to the second division. There they competed for three consecutive seasons in the second division until the 1959–60 season when the team won the second division championship, faced Sarakinos in a double qualification match. They won the match (1–0 away and 2–1 at home) and won promotion to the first division, 23 years after their first participation in the higher division of the Thessaly FCA.

=== Beta Ethniki – 1960s ===
After their promotion to the first division, they competed for three consecutive seasons in this division. In the 1962–63 season, for the first time in the club's history, they were crowned the champion of the first division and were promoted to Greek's second national league, Beta Ethniki. The team finished 15th place, second from the bottom. They were relegated to the local championships of the Thessaly FCA. They were relegated from the first division in 1966–67 and another relegation from the second division in 1968–69.

=== 1970s – 1980s ===
In the 1970–71 season, they won the third division and earned promotion to the second division. In the 1973–74 season, they won the second division championship and returned to the first division. In the same 1979–80 season, they managed to reach the final of the Thessaly FCA Cup. They competed in the first division until the 1989–90 season, when they won the first division championship for the second time in their history and were promoted to the Delta Ethniki, the Greek fourth national division.

=== Delta Ethniki – 1990s ===
Iraklis Volos competing for 3 consecutive seasons in the Delta Ehniki until 1992–93 and were relegated. They returned in the 1st division in 1993–94, won the championship and were promoted back to the Delta Ethniki. In the same season, the club won the Thessaly FCA Cup for the first time in its history by defeating Toxotis Volos in the final. In the 1994–95 season, they played in the 4th National Division, but owing to another relegation, returned to the local championships of the Thessaly FCA. In the 1998–99 season, the club was crowned champion for the fourth time in the 1st division. In the 1999–00 season, they competed in the Delta Ethniki, were relegated again, but won the Thessaly FCA cup, defeating Almyros F.C. in the final in the same year.

=== 2000s, decline and renaissance ===
Iraklis Volos, after being relegated from the Delta Ethniki, competed in the Thessaly FCA first division until the 2002–03 season, at the end of which they were relegated. They played in the 2nd division (2003–04, 2004–05) making bad appearances until 2005 when they went into inactivity. The club were not relegated in 2005–06 and 2006–07. In the 2007–08 period, the effort to reorganize the blue and white teams began, participating in the third division. In the next season 2008–09, they finished in third place and earned promotion to the second division.

=== Modern History ===
After two consecutive years in the second division, they won the championship in the 2010–11 season and were promoted to the first division. In the 2011–12 season, the club competed in the first division but are relegated again. There are two consecutive years in the second division until the 2013–14 season, when they earn promotion to the first division. After a modest appearance in the first division in the 2014–15 season, they managed to win the championship in the 2015–16 season under the managership of Yiannis Fasourakis. They participated in the play-offs for promotion to the Gamma Ethniki, but without success. From the 2016–17 season, they played in the first division until the 2019–20 season when they went into inactivity. The club was reorganized in the 2022–23 season starting from the third division in which they still competes today.

== Honors ==
=== Domestic Titles and honors ===
- Thessaly FCA First Division: 5
  - 1963–63, 1989–90, 1993–94, 1998–99, 2015–16
- Thessaly FCA Second Division: 4
  - 1933–34, 1959–60, 1973–74, 2010–11
- Thessaly FCA Third Division: 2
  - 1955–56, 1970–71
- Thessaly FCA Cup: 3
  - 1993–94, 1995–96, 1999–00
