= Carlos Djaló =

Portuguese footballer

Personal information
- Date of birth: 12 February 1993 (age 33)
- Place of birth: Guinea-Bissau
- Height: 1.92 m (6 ft 4 in)
- Position: Forward

Youth career
- Fabril

Senior career*
Years	Team	Apps	(Gls)
2014–2015	Valencia Mestalla	14	(13)
2016	Tourizense	5	(1)
2016	Besëlidhja	4	(1)
2017	Tadcaster Albion		
2017–2018	Romford	19	(9)
- Niki Tragano
- Korinthos
2019	Pirin Razlog		
2020	Krško	2	(0)
2021	CD Jávea	10	(2)
2022	Botev Vratsa	4	(0)
- * Club domestic league appearances and goals as of 18 July 2022

Carlos Djaló Só (born 12 February 1993) is a Bissau-Guinean-born Portuguese professional footballer who plays as a forward.

== Career ==
In 2014, Djaló trialed for the youth academy of Spanish La Liga side Valencia after playing for London APSA in the English ninth division.

In 2016, he signed for Albanian second division club Besëlidhja after playing for Tourizense in the Portuguese third division.

In 2019, he signed for Bulgarian lower league team Pirin (Razlog) after playing for Korinthos in the Greek lower leagues.

In 2020, Djaló signed for Slovenian second division outfit Krško.

In 2022, he signed for Asd Vico Equense in Eccellenza Italiana.
