= Georgios Matsades =

Greek footballer (born 1999)

Personal information
- Full name: Georgios Matsades
- Date of birth: 6 July 1999 (age 27)
- Place of birth: Athens, Greece
- Position: Forward

Team information
- Current team: AO Vrilission

Youth career
- Panionios

Senior career*
| Years | Team | Apps | (Gls) |
| 2018–2019 | Palliniakos | 25 | (6) |
| 2019–2020 | Thyella Rafina | 20 | (1) |
| 2020–2021 | Ethnikos Piraeus | 10 | (1) |
| 2021–2023 | Panathinaikos B | 17 | (0) |
| 2023 | Fostiras | | |
| 2023– | AO Vrilission | | |

International career
| 2016 | Greece U17 | 2 | (0) |
- * Club domestic league appearances and goals as of 31 January 2023

Georgios Matsades (Greek: Γεώργιος Ματσαδές; born 6 July 1999) is a Greek professional footballer who plays as a forward for AO Vrilission.
