= Christos Moustogiannis =

Greek footballer

Personal information
- Full name: Christos Moustogiannis
- Date of birth: 1 March 1983 (age 43)
- Place of birth: Athens, Greece
- Height: 1.66 m (5 ft 5 in)
- Position: Midfielder

Senior career*
Years	Team	Apps	(Gls)
2001–2008	Egaleo	112	(9)
2002–2003	→ Acharnaikos (loan)	33	(2)
2008–2009	Kerkyra	19	(1)
2010	Egaleo	18	(2)
2010–2011	Thrasyvoulos	26	(3)
2011	Glyfada	1	(0)
2012	Aiolikos		
2012–2013	Glyfada	20	(1)
2013	Panarkadikos		
2014–2015	Fostiras	21	(1)
2015–2016	Palliniakos		
2017–2018	Palliniakos		
2018–2019	Triglia Rafina		
2019–2020	Palliniakos		
2020–2021	Saronikos Anavyssos		
2021–2023	Koropi		
- * Club domestic league appearances and goals

Christos Moustogiannis (Greek: Χρήστος Μουστόγιαννης; born 1 March 1983) is a Greek former footballer who played as a midfielder.

== Career ==
Moustogiannis previously played for Egaleo in the Super League Greece and Kerkyra in the Beta Ethniki.
