= Perni =

Perni may refer to:

- Perni Venkataramaiah, Indian politician
- Perni, Kavala, a settlement within the Chrysoupoli municipal unit in Greece
- Keravnos Perni F.C., Greek football club
