= Lerna (disambiguation) =

Lerna was a region in classical Greece.

Lerna may also refer to:

- Lerna, Illinois, village
- Lerna Regio, region on Io
- Lerna (moth), genus
- Lerna (municipal unit), former municipality in Greece
- Lerna, a star in the constellation Hydra, also known as HAT-P-42
