= Georgi Chakarov =

Bulgarian footballer

Personal information
- Full name: Georgi Vasilev Chakarov
- Date of birth: 13 January 1989 (age 37)
- Place of birth: Smolyan, Bulgaria
- Height: 1.78 m (5 ft 10 in)
- Position: Attacking midfielder

Team information
- Current team: Kariana
- Number: 77

Youth career
- Rodopa Smolyan
- Levski Sofia

Senior career*
Years	Team	Apps	(Gls)
2008–2012	Levski Sofia	2	(0)
2009	→ Sportist Svoge (loan)	4	(0)
2010–2011	→ Pomorie (loan)	34	(6)
2012–2013	Lyubimets 2007	24	(4)
2014	Oborishte	12	(4)
2014–2016	Dunav Ruse	52	(19)
2016	Neftochimic	4	(0)
2017	Spartak Pleven	12	(5)
2017	Hebar		
2018	Spartak Pleven		
2018	Enosi Lerna		
2019	Chalkida		
2019–	Kariana	17	(0)

International career
2006	Bulgaria U19		
- * Club domestic league appearances and goals as of 15 December 2019

Georgi Chakarov (Bulgarian: Георги Чакъров; born 13 January 1989) is a Bulgarian footballer who plays as a midfielder for Kariana Erden.

== Career ==
=== Youth career ===
His first academy was PFC Rodopa Smolyan's youth team. In 2002, he played against Levski Sofia's youths and Georgi was noticed by Levski's scouts, which led to him finally joining the academy.

=== PFC Levski Sofia ===
Chakarov started playing for Levski's youth formations in 2002. He made his official debut for Levski Sofia's senior team on 18 October 2008 in a match against PFC Belasitsa Petrich. During the 2008/2009 season, Georgi was a part of Levski's second team, where he was one of the topscorers.

==== FC Sportist Svoge ====
On 27 June 2009 it was announced that Chakarov would be play on loan for FC Sportist Svoge during the first half of 2009/2010 season. The right winger played 4 matches for Sportist.

==== Chernomorets Pomorie ====
On 20 January 2010, Chakarov was loaned to Chernomorets Pomorie until early December 2011.

=== Spartak Pleven ===
In January 2017, Chakarov joined Spartak Pleven. He was released at the end of the season.

=== Hebar ===
In July 2017, Chakarov moved to Hebar Pazardzhik.

=== Return to Spartak Pleven ===
In January 2018, Chakarov returned to Spartak Pleven, taking part in the pre-season training. He left the club at the end of the season.

=== Enosi Lerna and Chalkida ===
In the summer 2018, Chakarov joined Enosi Lerna FC and played there until the end of January 2019, where he signed with Chalkida FC.

=== Coaching ===
As of 2025 Chakarov is an assistant coach for Botev Plovdiv.

== Club career statistics ==
This statistic includes domestic league, domestic cup and European tournaments.

Season	Team	Country	Division	Apps	Goals
2015–16	Dunav Ruse	Bulgaria	2	12	3
2014–15	Dunav Ruse	Bulgaria	3	29	16
2013–14	Lyubimetz 2007	Bulgaria	1	5	0
2012–13	Lyubimetz 2007	Bulgaria	2	19	4
2011–12	Chernomorets Pomorie	Bulgaria	2	2	1
2010–11	Chernomorets Pomorie	Bulgaria	2	20	2
2009–10	Chernomorets Pomorie	Bulgaria	2	12	3
2009–10	FC Sportist Svoge	Bulgaria	1	4	0
2008–09	PFC Levski Sofia	Bulgaria	1	2	0

Last update: 13 December 2015

== Trivia ==
- His favourite team abroad is Borussia Dortmund
- Chakarov's favourite footballer is Tomáš Rosický
