= Giannis Milkoudis =

Greek footballer

Personal information
- Full name: Ioannis Milkoudis
- Date of birth: 29 July 1987 (age 39)
- Place of birth: Katerini, Greece
- Height: 1.83 m (6 ft 0 in)
- Position: Centre-back

Team information
- Current team: Triglia
- Number: 5

Senior career*
| Years | Team | Apps | (Gls) |
| –2010 | Makedonikos | 1 | (0) |
| 2010–2012 | Odysseas Kordelio | | |
| 2012–2013 | Aiginiakos | | |
| 2013–2016 | Ethnikos Neo Agioneri | | |
| 2016– | Triglia | 17 | (0) |
- * Club domestic league appearances and goals as of 13:53, 04 April 2020 (UTC)

Giannis Milkoudis (Greek: Γιάννης Μιλκούδης; born 29 July 1987) is a Greek professional footballer who plays as a centre-back for Football League club Triglia, for which he is captain.

== Club career ==
Born in Katerini, Greece, Giannis made his senior debut with Gamma Ethniki side Makedonikos, in the 2008–09 season and secured his maiden appearance for the club against the rivalry side Anagennisi Giannitson F.C. whereby they managed a win in Greek Super Cup game by 4–2. He had had the contract with the club until July, 2010. He profoundly played for Greek clubs.

After the contract with Makedonikos, he was signed by the Greek club Odysseas Kordelio whereby he remained in the senior squad of Gamma Ethniki side and the contract end in 2012. He had no appearance for the senior squad and followed a transfer to PAE Eginiakos in mid-2012. He then signed a contract of a 3-year spell with Greek club playing for Ethnikos Neou Agioneriou and remained for the club until 2016. In the mid of 2016 Zonas penned a deal with the Greece side Triglia. Finally Milkoudis is playing in Greece for Triglia also acting as a skipper of the side.

He has featured in Football League, Greek Football Cup or Kypello Elladas.(Greek).

== Career statistics ==
Appearances and goals by club, season and competition
| Club | Season | League | | | Cup | | Total | |
| Club | Season | Division | Apps | Goals | Apps | Goals | Apps | Goals |
|---|---|---|---|---|---|---|---|---|
| Makedonikos | 2008–09 | Gamma Ethniki | — | — | 1 | 0 | 1 | 0 |
| Triglia | 2018–19 play-off rounds | Gamma Ethniki | 2 | 0 | — | — | 2 | 0 |
| Triglia | 2019–20 | Football League | 15 | 0 | — | — | 15 | 0 |
