= Atromitos Patras F.C. =

Association football club in Greece

Atromitos Patras
- Full name: Athlitikos Podosfairikos Syllogos Atromitos Patras
- Founded: 1929; 97 years ago
- Ground: Zarouchleika Municipal Stadium
- Chairman: Nektarios Skondras
- Manager: Vasilios Balatis
- League: Gamma Ethniki
- 2025–26: Achaea FCA First Division, 1st (promoted)
Home colours	Away colours

Atromitos Patras (Greek: Ατρόμητος Πατρών) is a Greek football club based in Zarouchleika, Patras. Its official colours are orange and blue.

== History ==
It was founded in 1929, initially based in the central district of Markato under the name "Aris Patras", before moving to the Zarouchleika area and being renamed "Atromitos Patras Athletic and Football Club" during the presidency of Ntinos Vasilopoulos. On 23 November 1929, it was officially recognized by the Court of First Instance of Patras. It competed in local championships until the Occupation, during which two of its athletes became war victims. Following the withdrawal of German forces, the club played a friendly match against British soldiers at the Achaea Clauss field, with Atromitos being transported using English vehicles. Subsequently, the club continued to compete in local championships as well as the Delta Ethniki. During the military dictatorship, the club remained unaffected by the mergers or dissolutions that were imposed on other sports associations.

In 1975, Atromitos Patras lost the Achaea FCA Championship title in a play-off match against Aris Patras, missing out on qualification for the promotion play-offs to the Beta Ethniki. During the 1992–93 season, the club was crowned Achaea FCA Champion and earned promotion to the Delta Ethniki for the following campaign, featuring notable players in its squad such as Dimitris Tsaousoglou, Giannis Katsigiannis, Kostas Triadas, Kostas Kyriakopoulos, Giannis Kontos, and Panagiotis Mexas. In the 1993–94 Delta Ethniki, it finished in 11th place with a record of 13 wins, 4 draws, and 17 losses, resulting in relegation.

During the 2014–15 and 2015–16 seasons, the club reached the final of the Achaea FCA Cup, facing Aris Patras and Keravnos Agios Vasileios respectively. In the 2018–19 season, Atromitos reached the final once again, where it defeated Panegialios 2–1 in a comeback victory to win the Achaea FCA Cup for the first time, while also securing its qualification for the following season's Greek Cup.

In the 2023–24 season, Atromitos won its second Achaea FCA Championship title, 31 years after its first victory. In the 2025–26 season, the club won again the Achaea FCA Championship and earned promotion to the Gamma Ethniki for the first time.

== Stadium ==
The club's home ground is the Zarouchleika Municipal Stadium. Zarouchleika Stadium features a synthetic turf surface.

It hosts six amateur teams from the eastern side of the city along with their competitive squads and academies free of charge, while also hosting local league matches.

== Honours ==
=== Regional titles ===
- Achaea FCA First Division: 3
  - 1992–93, 2023–24, 2025–26
- Achaea FCA Cup: 1
  - 2018–19
- Achaea Super FCA Cup: 1
  - 2024
