= Panmovriakos F.C. =

Greek football club

Panmovriakos
- Full name: Athlitikos Omilos Panmovriakos Riolos
- Founded: 1975; 51 years ago
- Ground: Riolos Ground
- Chairman: Dimitrios Spyropoulos
- Manager: Andreas Androutsos
- League: Achaea FCA First Division
- 2025–26: Achaea FCA First Division, 5th

Panmovriakos Riolos Football Club (Greek: Πανμοβριακός Ριόλου) is a Greek football club, based in Riolos, Achaea.

== History ==
Panmovriakos was founded in 1975, and in 2025 the club celebrated its 50th anniversary in Greek football with the publication of a commemorative history book album. Panmovriakos owes its name to Mount Movri in western Achaea, at the foot of which lies the village of Riolos, the team's hometown.

During the 2017–18 season, Panmovriakos won the Achaea FCA First Division title for the first time in its history and achieved promotion to the Gamma Ethniki. The 2018–19 season in the Gamma Ethniki proved to be difficult for the team, and despite its valiant effort, it finished in 11th place and could not avoid relegation.

== Honours ==
=== Domestic ===
  - Achaea FCA champion: 1
    - 2017–18
