= Theseus Agria F.C. =

Greek football club

Theseus Agria
- Full name: Gymnastikos Syllogos Theseus Agria
- Founded: 1927; 99 years ago
- Ground: Agria Municipal Stadium, Agria, Greece
- Capacity: 300
- Chairman: Nikolaos Arampatzis
- Manager: Kostas Papastergiou
- League: Thessaly FCA First Division
- 2025–26: Thessaly FCA First Division, 7th
Home colours	Away colours

Theseus Agria Football Club (Greek: Γ.Σ. Θησέας Αγριάς) is a Greek football club based in Agria, Magnesia, Greece.

== History ==
Theseus Agria was founded in 1927 as a mountaineering club and was later converted exclusively into a football club. It belongs to the Thessaly Football Clubs Association.

Theseus Agria celebrated its first Thessaly FCA league title in the 1991–92 season under head coach Thanasis Vitas, with Vasilis Malakasiotis finishing as the top scorer with 22 goals. The club finished 1st in the standings with 52 points, recording 24 wins, 4 draws, and 2 losses.

In the 2004–05 season, under head coach Vangelis Vouroukos, Theseus Agria finished 1st in Group 1 with 60 points (19 wins, 3 draws, and 2 losses), finishing ahead of 2nd-placed Dafni (50 pts) and 3rd-placed Nileas (48 pts). To decide the overall champion, the club played in a championship play-off match against Asteras Rizomylos—the undefeated winner of Group 2—and defeated them 4–3 in a penalty shoot-out.

In the 2006–07 season, under head coach Nikos Chatzikyriakidis, the team finished first with 85 points (26 wins, 7 draws, and 1 loss), leaving Kentavros 2nd with 77 points and Magnisiakos 3rd with 75 points. That year, Theseus remained undefeated away from home (scoring 38–14 goals) and suffered only a single defeat at home.

In the 2017–18 season, the club won its fourth, and most recent to date, Thessaly FCA championship title, securing promotion to Gamma Ethniki for the first time in its history. In the 2018–19 Gamma Ethniki season, the club competed in the 4th Group. The first match in its history in Gamma Ethniki was against Niki Volos on 30 September 2018 in Volos for the opening matchday, where they were defeated 5–0.

After 4 consecutive seasons in the Gamma Ethniki, Theseus was relegated to the local championship at the end of the 2021–22 season. In the 2022–23 season, the club won its third Thessaly FCA Cup, defeating Olympiacos Volos 1–0 in extra time in the final held at the Panthessaliko Stadium.

== Honours ==
=== Domestic ===
  - Thessaly FCA Champion: 4
    - 1991–92, 2004–05, 2006–07, 2017–18
  - Thessaly FCA Cup Winners: 3
    - 1988–89, 2007–08, 2022–23
