= Agios Dimitrios Patras F.C. =

Agios Dimitrios A.C. Α.Ο. Αγίου Δημητρίου A.O. Agiou Dimitriou
- Founded: 1972
- Ground: Andreas Kanistras Arena; Patras, Greece
- Manager: Giorgos Raptis
- League: EPS Achaia Second Division
Home colours	Away colours

The first version of this article has been based in the text of el:Α.Ο. Αγίου Δημητρίου of the Greek Wikipedia published under GFDL.

Agios Dimitrios A.C. (Greek: Α.Ο. Αγίου Δημητρίου A.Ο. Agiou Dimitriou) is an athletic club in Patras in the upper city neighbourhood in the Achaia prefecture. Its jersey colours are red and white and it plays in the Achaia Football Clubs Association. It has the number EPO 1865. The team had played for many years in the third division. The team also has a basketball team.

== Participation ==
- Second division: 1980

== Achievements ==
- Achaia Championship: 1

1979

- Second division championship: 2

1978, 1995
