= Academy Alexandros Kilkis F.C. =

Academy Alexandros Kilkis
- Founded: 1999; 27 years ago
- Ground: Alexandros Sport Center
- Chairman: Theodoros Doudoukis
- Manager: Makis Grigorakis
- League: Kilkis FCA A1
- 2024–25: 10th of 12
- Website: alexandroskilkis.blogspot.com

Academy Alexandros Kilkis Football Club is a Greek football club, based in Kilkis, Kilkis, Greece that competes in the Kilkis FCA A1, which is part of the fifth tier of football in Greece.

== History ==
Theodoros Ntountouki founded Academy Alexandros Kilkis F.C. in 1999 and played in regional amateur leagues overseen by the Football Clubs Association of Kilkis during the early 2000s.

The club won the 2015–16 A' Category Eastern Group and then the club won the 2017–18 Kilkis FCA A1 to secure promotion to the Gamma Ethniki for the first time in the club's history. They finished in eighth place in the 2018–19 Gamma Ethniki Group 1 and won the Kilkis FCA Cup during the same season, but they withdrew from the Beta Ethniki before the 2019–20 season began. This was due to financial trouble.

They continue to compete in the Kilkis FCA A1 and they narrowly avoided relegation during the 2021–22 and 2022–23 seasons.

== Stadium ==
Academy Alexandros Kilkis plays at the Alexandros Sport Center in Kilkis and it was opened in 1999. The pitch was refurbished during the 2000s and upgrades to the stadium completed in July 2024 allow for the pitch to be covered for year-round training.

== Honours ==
=== Domestic ===
- A' Category (Eastern Group): 2015–16
- Kilkis FCA A1: 2017–18
- Kilkis FCA Cup: 2018–19
