= Olympiakos Patras F.C. =

Greek football club

Olympiacos Patras
- Full name: Α.Π.Σ. Ολυμπιακός Πατρών; A.P.S Olympiakós Patrón
- Nickname: Bebides (Μπέμπηδες)
- Founded: 1925
- Ground: Prosfygika Stadium; Patras, Greece
- Capacity: 4,000
- League: Achaea FCA Second Division
- 2025–26: Achaea FCA Second Division (Group 2), 12th
Home colours	Away colours

APS Olympiacos Patras (Greek: Α.Π.Σ. Ολυμπιακός Πατρών, A.P.S Olympiakos Patron) is a sports club in Patras, playing association football and volleyball. The team plays with the EPS Achaias and the EPO number 1788.

== Logo ==
The logo is the same as Olympiacos in Piraeus in suburban Athens.

== Field ==
In 1926, refugees from Asia Minor bought several fields and built a stadium for Olympiacos where it still has the name Prosfygika Stadium and is the third oldest field in Greece after Karaiskaki and Leoforos Alexandras (Kypseli. The team was founded in 1927, nearly two years after the construction, with the game with Olympiacos Petralona which won 4–1.

== History ==
From the first year of the founding they play with Panachaiki, Thyella, Patraikos and Apollon. Olympiacos founded from refugee players with members from Apollon Smyrna in which after the Greco-Turkish War in 1922 arrived and relocated to Patras and built the today's neighbourhood of Prosfygika. Together who brought love to association football. In 1925, the team was one of the oldest in Patras, with the color of red and white, the same as Olympiacos Piraeus.

In the beginning in July 1925, six players from Panachaiki and four from Legkos Asteras, all of them refugees as Mercury and the colour blue and white. The jersey colors changed later on. Their first game in history was with Lefko Astera, as Hermes which became the only to receive that name. As Olympiacos, their first game was with "Cavallo" who won 7–1. Their first game was Panachaiki-Olympiacos on November 9, 1925 who won 0-2 for the championship at the time. In 1933, the team played with Turkish, they played with the teams that once had a Greek population, Adapazarı, Bursa and İzmir. In 1960, the team entered the second division in the 1959-60 and again in the 1960–61 season.

== Volleyball ==
Olympiacos also has a volleyball club dating back to 1927. In 2005, the team entered the A2 Division. Olympiacos also has a basketball team. In their first years, it also played water polo.

== Standings (association football) ==
=== Achaia FCA ===
Year	Ranking	Games	Points	W	T	L	F
1930–31		12	10	4	0	2	11-1
1934–35	3rd		6				
1935–36	2nd		6				
1948–49	6th		25				
1949–50	1st		25				20-14
1950–51	3rd		20				
1951–52	2nd		22				
1952–53	3rd		2-				
1957–58			24				
1959–60	1st		33				

== Achievements ==
=== Association football ===
- Second division participants: 1962, 1967
- Achaia Championships: 1926, 1927, 1940, 1950, 1960, 1967

=== Dodgeball ===
- Second Division Championships: 2005
