= Stathis Provatidis =

Greek footballer

Personal information
- Full name: Efstathios Provatidis
- Date of birth: 7 December 1982 (age 43)
- Place of birth: Athens, Greece
- Height: 1.80 m (5 ft 11 in)
- Position: Centre-back

Senior career*
Years	Team	Apps	(Gls)
–2007	Proodeftiki	58	(0)
2007–2010	Ethnikos Asteras	44	(1)
2010–2011	Diagoras	22	(0)
2011–2012	Kalloni	8	(0)
2012–2013	Thrasyvoulos	32	(0)
2013–2014	Acharnaikos	17	(0)
2014–2015	Diagoras		
2015–2017	Ionikos		
2017–2020	Diagoras	21	(0)
- * Club domestic league appearances and goals as of 13:38, 18 August 2020 (UTC)

Stathis Provatidis (Greek: Στάθης Προβατίδης; born 2 December 1982) is a Greek professional footballer who plays as a centre-back.

== Club career ==
Born in Athens, Greece, Provatidis made his senior debut with Greece side Proodeftiki and played pretty consistently at the club appearing 55 times, and had the contract with the club until July, 2007 . On 1, 2007, he joined Ethnikos Asteras and had his major impact on the coach as well as team-mates. he secured 44 appearances and smashed the ball one in the net. He profoundly played for Greek clubs.

Provatidis followed a transfer to Diagoras in 2010 and stayed until 2011. He then signed a contract of one year with Greek club playing in Greece namely Kalloni and remained for the club until 2012. In mid 2012 he signed a year spell with the Greece side Thrasyvoulos securing major 32 appearances for the club. The gained a decent momentum for having long-enough period that he appeared for the club.

He then moved to Acharnaikos in 2013 and capped 8 times for the Greece side. Afterwards, a transfer to Diagoras followed where he remained until 2014. He then signed a deal with the Greek side Diagoras whereby he had had his second spell.

Provatidis played for Nikea based side Ionikos and had no a maiden appearance for the club in any sort of competition.

The Greek was transferred to Diagoras for the third time and the fame rose. He is currently acting as a skipper of the side as well. Noteworthy at his three tenures he earned a profound 45 caps for the club. He has featured in famous Leagues and Competitions namely Greek Football Cup or Kypello Elladas (Greek) only once and Football League 172 times.
