= Olympiakos Kymina F.C. =

Greek football club

Olympiakos Kymina
- Full name: Morfotikos Athlitikos Syllogos Olympiakos Kymina
- Founded: 1949; 77 years ago
- Ground: Kymina Municipal Stadium
- Chairman: Athanasios Agkelou
- Manager: Georgios Nasiopoulos
- League: Macedonia FCA
- 2024–25: Macedonia FCA Second Division, 11th

Olympiakos Kymina Football Club is a Greek football club, based in Kymina, Thessaloniki, Greece.

== Honours ==
=== Domestic Titles and honours ===
  - Macedonia FCA champion: 2
    - 1995–96, 2010–11
  - Macedonia FCA Cup Winners : 1
    - 2011–12
