= Christos Kollas =

Greek footballer

Personal information
- Date of birth: 1 May 1997 (age 29)
- Place of birth: Greece
- Position: Forward

Team information
- Current team: Aris Petroupolis
- Number: 9

Youth career
- –2013: AO Kipoupolis
- 2013–2014: Atromitos
- 2014–2015: Ermionida

Senior career*
| Years | Team | Apps | (Gls) |
| 2015–2016 | Ermionida | ? | (?) |
| 2016 | Vyzas Megara | ? | (?) |
| 2016–2018 | Opountios Martino | ? | (?) |
| 2018 | Volos | 1 | (0) |
| 2018–2019 | Agioi Anargyroi | 20 | (9) |
| 2019–2020 | Thesprotos | 23 | (7) |
| 2020–2021 | Kavala | 16 | (6) |
| 2021–2022 | Chania | 25 | (5) |
| 2022–2024 | Egaleo | 23 | (2) |
| 2024- | Aris Petroupolis | | |
- * Club domestic league appearances and goals as of 16 June 2023

Christos Kollas (Greek: Χρήστος Κολλάς; born 1 May 1997) is a Greek professional footballer who plays as a forward for Gamma Ethniki club Aris Petroupolis.
