= Aspis Xanthi F.C. =

Aspis Xanthi
- Full name: Athlitikos Politistikos Syllogos Aspis Xanthi
- Founded: 1922; 104 years ago
- Ground: Municipal Xanthi Stadium
- Capacity: 500
- Chairman: Apostolos Paslakis
- Manager: Nikos Chatziparaskevas
- League: Xanthi FCA First Division
- 2025–26: Xanthi FCA First Division, 3rd
Home colours	Away colours

Aspis Xanthi F.C. (Greek: Α.Π.Σ. Ασπίς Ξάνθης) is a Greek football club, based in Xanthi, Xanthi.

== Honours ==
=== Domestic ===
  - Second Division: 1
    - 1960–61
  - Delta Ethniki: 1
    - 1989–90
  - Greek Football Amateur Cup: 1
    - 1991–92
  - Xanthi FCA Champions: 2
    - 1987–88, 2017–18
  - Xanthi FCA Cup Winners: 7
    - 1978–79, 1979–80, 1980–81, 1981–82, 1988–89, 1991–92, 2001–02
