= Meliteas Meliti F.C. =

Greek football club

Meliteas Meliti
- Full name: Athlitikos Morfotikos Syllogos Meliteas Meliti
- Founded: 1957; 69 years ago
- Ground: Meliti Ground
- Chairman: Theofanis Sovislis
- Manager: Ilias Solakis
- League: Florina FCA First Division
- 2025–26: Florina FCA First Division, 2nd
Home colours

Meliteas Meliti Football Club is a Greek football club, based in Meliti, Florina, Greece.

== Honours ==
=== Domestic ===
  - Florina FCA champion: 10
    - 1981–82, 1985–86, 1987–88, 1990–91, 1994–95, 1996–97, 1998–99, 2002–03, 2017–18, 2021–22
  - Florina FCA Cup Winners: 3
    - 2003–04, 2011–12, 2018–19
