= Enosi Lerna F.C. =

Greek football club

Enosi Lerna
- Founded: 2009
- Ground: Lerna Municipal Stadium, Lerna, Greece
- Chairman: Georgios Karatasoulis
- Manager: Loukas Kouros
- League: Argolis FCA

Enosi Lerna Football Club is a Greek football club, based in Lerna, Argolis, Greece.

== Honours ==
=== Domestic Titles and honours ===
  - Argolis FCA champion: 2
    - 2015–16, 2017–18
