= Magnisiakos F.C. =

Association football club in Greece

Magnisiakos
- Full name: Athlitikos Syllogos Volos Magnisiakos
- Founded: 1961; 65 years ago
- Ground: Magnisiakos Ground
- Chairman: Konstantinos Gougoulias
- Manager: Konstantinos Triantafyllou
- League: Thessaly FCA Second Division
- 2025–26: Thessaly FCA Third Division, 4th (promoted)
Home colours	Away colours

Athlitikos Syllogos Volos Magnisiakos (Greek: Αθλητικός Σύλλογος Βόλου Μαγνησιακός) is a Greek football club based in Volos, Thessaly. The official foundation year of the club is 1961, and its official colors are blue and white.

== History ==
Magnisiakos was officially founded in 1961 following the merger of Kentavros Volos (founded in 1928) and Pagasitikos Volos (founded in 1945); nevertheless, the club claims 1928—the founding year of Kentavros—as its establishment date.

In 1965, the club was crowned champion and earned promotion to the newly formed Gamma Ethniki. During the 1965–66 season, Magnisiakos competed in Gamma Ethniki, finishing 8th out of 10 teams in Group C. The following season (1966–67), it competed once again in Gamma Ethniki, securing 5th place in Group C. Following the abolition of the division, Magnisiakos returned to the local regional league, winning 1st place in the 1967–68 season and earning a spot in the Special Amateurs' Championship for promotion to Beta Ethniki. In this mini-tournament, Magnisiakos finished 4th, subsequently returning to the local league. In the 1969–70 season, the club won the Thessaly FCA championship once again and participated in the 1970 Special Amateurs' Championship. Finishing last in a four-team group, Magnisiakos spent the remainder of the 1970s competing in the top local division without claiming another league title.

In the 1981–82 season, the club won the league title after a 12-year hiatus, earning promotion to a national division for the first time. During the 1982–83 season, Magnisiakos competed in the newly established Delta Ethniki without notable success, finishing second to last in the Group 5 standings and suffering immediate relegation. In the 1985–86 season, the club returned to Delta Ethniki after achieving a domestic double in the Thessaly FCA championship. In the 1986–87 season, Magnisiakos displayed a competitive performance, finishing in 9th place, but was nonetheless relegated due to a reduction in the number of teams participating in Delta Ethniki. The 1990s were marked by frequent fluctuations for the club. In the 1992–93 season, Magnisiakos suffered relegation to the Second Division for the first time in its history, though it bounced back two years later by finishing in 3rd place. It was relegated once more three years later in the 1997–98 season, but this stint in the Second Division proved brief as the club secured 2nd place upon its return.

In the 2002–03 season, Magnisiakos captured the Thessaly FCA championship title for the first time in 17 years, earning promotion back to Delta Ethniki. The following season proved disappointing, as the club finished at the bottom of the table and was relegated. Notably during that campaign, Magnisiakos faced the historic local rival Olympiacos Volos, suffering defeats of 3–1 and 2–0 respectively.

From the 2004–05 season onward, the club spent 19 consecutive years competing in the local regional First and Second divisions. In the 2022–23 season, Magnisiakos secured a second consecutive promotion, winning the Thessaly FCA championship by a single point and qualifying for the Special Amateurs' Championship for promotion to Gamma Ethniki, where it successfully earned promotion after an outstanding campaign. However, this period of success was short-lived; the newly promoted side was unable to remain competitive in Gamma Ethniki and withdrew from the league after the 8th matchday, having earned just one point. During the 2024–25 and 2025–26 seasons, Magnisiakos played in the Third Division of Thessaly FCA. Despite finishing 4th in the 2025–26 season, the club earned promotion to the higher division due to a vacant spot that arose.

== Stadium ==
Magnisiakos Ground is located in the Palaiá district, Volos. It is built near the river and right next to the ancient castle of Volos. It features small stands with a capacity of up to 150 to 200 people. In 2024, the ground was renamed the A.S.V. Magnisiakos "Takis Metaxas" Sports Center in honor of the long-serving former player, coach, and official of the club.

During the 2023–24 season, the club used the Pantelis Magoulas Stadium to cover its needs in Gamma Ethniki.

== Honours ==
=== Regional ===
- Thessaly FCA First Division
  - Winners (7): 1964–65, 1967–68, 1969–70, 1981–82, 1985–86, 2002–03, 2022–23
- Thessaly FCA Cup
  - Winners (1): 1985–86
- Thessaly FCA Second Division
  - Winners (2): 2016–17, 2021–22
