= Floriada F.C. =

Greek football club

A.O. Floriada
- Founded: 1981; 44 years ago
- Ground: Kompoti Municipal Stadium
- Chairman: Thomas Vasilas
- Manager: Georgios Giannos
- League: Arta FCA (retired from Gamma Ethniki)
- 2017-18: Arta FCA champion

A.O. Floriada Football Club is a Greek football club, based in Floriada, Aetolia-Acarnania, Greece. Although the village of Floriada is located in Aetolia-Acarnania, the team of A.O. Floriada Football Club participates in Arta FCA championships.

== Honours ==
=== Domestic Titles and honours ===
  - Arta FCA champion: 1
    - 2017–18
