= Ilias Solakis =

Greek footballer and manager (born 1974)

Personal information
- Date of birth: 15 December 1974 (age 51)
- Place of birth: Florina, Greece
- Height: 1.79 m (5 ft 10 in)
- Position: Forward

Team information
- Current team: Meliteas Meliti (manager)

Youth career
- 1989–1994: PAS Florina

Senior career*
Years	Team	Apps	(Gls)
1994–1998	Veria	46	(5)
1996–1997	→ Almopos Aridea (loan)	20	(8)
1998	Ialysos	15	(21)
1998–2001	Panachaiki	85	(29)
2001–2002	APOEL	26	(15)
2002–2005	AEK Athens	8	(0)
2002–2003	→ Panionios (loan)	3	(0)
2003–2004	→ Niki Volos (loan)	21	(5)
2005–2006	Doxa Drama	13	(3)
2006–2007	Kastoria	31	(21)
2007–2009	PAS Giannina	59	(29)
2009–2010	Diagoras	12	(6)
2010–2011	Olympiacos Volos	43	(20)
2011–2012	Asteras Tripolis	14	(1)
2012–2013	Panachaiki	4	(0)
2013	Olympiacos Volos	31	(6)
2014–2015	Anagennisi Ptolemaida		
2015–2016	Makedonikos Foufa	36	(42)
2016–2017	PAS Florina		

Managerial career
- 2018–2019: PAS Florina
- 2020: Olympiacos Volos (assistant)
- 2020: Olympiacos Volos
- 2020–2021: Olympiacos Volos (assistant)
- 2022–2023: Kastoria
- 2024–2025: PAS Florina
- 2026–: Meliteas Meliti
- * Club domestic league appearances and goals

Ilias Solakis (Greek: Ηλίας Σολάκης; born 15 December 1974) is a Greek former professional footballer who played as a forward.

== Playing career ==
Solakis began his career at his local club, PAS Florina. In 1994 he moved to Veria, where he played in the first division during the 1996–97 and 1997–98 seasons. During his spell at the club he was loaned to Almopos Aridea for a season. In 1998 Solakis signed for Panachaiki, where he also played in the first division during the 1999–2000 and 2000–01 seasons.

In summer of 2001 he moved to APOEL, where he helped the club to win the 2001–02 Cypriot First Division by scoring 15 goals in 26 appearances. On 5 August 2002 Solakis returned to Greece and signed for AEK Athens, but was sent to Panionios as a loan. He returned to AEK in January 2003, where he spent the rest of the season. In the summer of 2003 he was loaned to Niki Volos for a season. Afterwards, he returned to the club of Athens and spent a season where he was used as a back-up option.

On 26 August Solakis was transferred to Doxa Drama. In the following season he signed for Kastoria, where he made the best season of his career scoring 21 goals in 35 matches and emerged as the top scorer of the second division. He then moved to PAS Giannina, where he played for two seasons and signed for Diagoras. In 2010 he joined Olympiacos Volos, where he got the chance to play in the first division. In the summer of 2011 the expulsion of the club from the first division and their relegation to the fourth division, resulted in Solakis leaving the club. On 29 September 2011 he signed a one-year contract with Asteras Tripolis. After his contract was expired he returned to Panachaiki for a brief spell and then back to Olympiacos Volos.

In 2013 Solakis took a break from football that lasted about a year and then returned, joining Anagennisi Ptolemaida. In 2015 he moved to Makedonikos Foufa, where he played for a season. Afterwards, he returned to PAS Florina, where he ended his career in 2017.

== Managerial career ==
In 2018 Solakis became the manager of PAS Florina for a season. In 2020 he served as an assistant manager at Olympiacos Volos, where he also had a brief spell as manager. In 2022 he took charge of Kastoria for a season. In 2024 he returned at the bench of PAS Florina. In 2026, Solakis became the manager of Meliteas Meliti.

== Honours ==
Individual

- Beta Ethniki top scorer: 2006–07, 2009–10
- Beta Ethniki player of the year: 2006–07
