= A.C. Rigas Feraios Velestino =

Rigas Feraios
- Full name: Athlitikos Syllogos Rigas Feraios Velestino
- Founded: 1926; 100 years ago
- Ground: Velestino Municipal Stadium
- Capacity: 2,500
- Chairman: Thanasis Chatzitheodorou
- Manager: Nikos Theodosiadis
- League: Gamma Ethniki
- 2025–26: Thessaly FCA First Division, 1st (promoted)
Home colours	Away colours	Third colours

Athletic Club Rigas Feraios Velestinou (Greek: Αθλητικός Σύλλογος Ρήγας Φεραίος. Βελεστίνου) is a Greek football club from Velestino, Magnesia. The club was made and named in the Greek War of Independence hero, Rigas Feraios, who was born and raised in Velestino.

== History ==
Rigas Feraios was created in 1926 as an amateur club in Velestino. Through the club have passed hundreds of young people of Velestino offering their skills and writing to the club's history. The club was created in 1926 and in 1928 established the football club "Riga Fereou".

During the years 1955-1958 "Rigas Feraios F.C." plays in the local category C, where he pioneered and in 1959 "Rigas" declared local champion in the C category. In 1961 "Rigas" being champ in local category B rises to A local class. Season 1973-1974 was the most fruitful for the club because it was in the Second National Division, which is the landmark in the history of "Rigas Feraios F.C.". 1994–1995, being a local champion in the A category promoted for the first time in Delta Ethniki. In 2000-2001 finish in 5th place in the Delta Ethniki where it remains until the year 2007. In 2010 the team relegated in the first local of EPS Thessaly and decides to reorganize.

== Honours ==
=== Domestic ===
League

- Thessaly FCA First Division
  - Winners (10): 1970–71, 1972–73, 1973–74, 1974–75, 1977–77, 1980–81, 1994–95, 2009–10, 2011–12, 2025–26

Cup

- Thessaly FCA Cup
  - Winners (8): 1976–77, 1980–81, 1981–82, 2004–05, 2005–06, 2008–09, 2011–12, 2024–25

== Notable Friendlies ==
The team have played twice against AEK Athens, the Greek Football giants. They may have lost twice, however they played decently in both games.

18 August 2013	A.C. Rigas Feraios Velestino (Greece)	1 – 3	(Greece) AEK Athens	Velestino
18.00 UTC +2	Chatzis 58'	Report	Paliaroutas 45'; Brečević 67', 71'	Stadium: Velestino Stadium

20 August 2014	A.C. Rigas Feraios Velestino (Greece)	0 – 4	(Greece) AEK Athens	Velestino
18:00 UTC +2			Zorić 9'; Dounis 32'; Kolovetsios 39'; Barbosa 43'	Stadium: Velestino Stadium
