= Spyros Glynos =

Greek footballer

Personal information
- Full name: Spyridon Glynos
- Date of birth: 2 December 1997 (age 28)
- Place of birth: Athens, Greece
- Height: 1.68 m (5 ft 6 in)
- Position: Right winger

Youth career
- Panionios

Senior career*
Years	Team	Apps	(Gls)
2017–2020	Panionios	1	(0)
2018	→ Kallithea (loan)	10	(0)
2018–2020	→ Diagoras (loan)	15	(5)
2020–2023	AEL	38	(2)
2023–2024	Panionios		
2024–2025	PAEEK	29	(8)
2025–2026	Nestos Chrysoupoli	23	(3)
- * Club domestic league appearances and goals as of 26 April 2026

Spyros Glynos (Greek: Σπύρος Γλυνός; born 2 December 1997) is a Greek professional footballer who plays as a winger.
