= Grevena Aerata F.C. =

Greek football club

Grevena Aerata
- Founded: 2000; 26 years ago
- Ground: Grevena Municipal Stadium
- Chairman: Panagiotis Apostolidis
- Manager: Nikolaos Mpalodimos
- League: Grevena FCA

Grevena Aerata Football Club is a Greek football club, based in Grevena, Grevena (regional unit), Greece.

== Honours ==
=== Domestic Titles and honours ===
  - Grevena FCA champion: 4
    - 2008–09, 2010–11, 2013–14, 2017–18
  - Grevena FCA Cup Winners: 2
    - 2013–14, 2018–19
