= Pantelis Rizogiannis =

Greek footballer

Personal information
- Full name: Panteleimon Rizogiannis
- Date of birth: 1 February 1988 (age 38)
- Place of birth: Karditsa, Greece
- Height: 1.76 m (5 ft 9 1/2 in)
- Position: Defensive midfielder

Senior career*
Years	Team	Apps	(Gls)
2007–2011	Skoda Xanthi	41	(0)
2010–2011	→ Trikala (loan)	23	(0)
2011–2013	Niki Volos	34	(0)
2013–2015	Panelefsiniakos	14	(0)
2015–2017	Trikala	57	(7)
2017–2018	Doxa Drama	39	(3)
2019	Olympiacos Volos	0	(0)
2019–2023	Trikala	77	(13)
2023–2024	Leontari		

International career
2009	Greece U21	4	(0)
- * Club domestic league appearances and goals as of 13 April 2022

Pantelis Rizogiannis (Greek: Παντελής Ριζογιάννης; born 1 February 1988) is a Greek professional footballer who plays as a defensive midfielder.
