= Doxa Kato Kamila FC =

Doxa Kato Kamila
- Full name: Doxa Kato Kamila Football Club
- Founded: 1951; 75 years ago
- Ground: Doxa FC Arena
- League: —
- 2023-24: —

Doxa Kato Kamila Football Club (Greek: Δόξα Κάτω Καμήλας) is a Greek football club based in Kato Kamila, Serres, Greece.

== Honours ==
- Serres FCA
  - Winners (1): 2018–19
