= Iraklis Neos Zygos F.C. =

Iraklis Zygos
- Full name: Iraklis Neos Zygos Football Club
- Founded: 1952; 74 years ago
- Ground: Yenisea Municipal Stadium
- Chairman: Theodoros Chalarampidis
- Manager: Ioannis Dimitriadis
- League: Xanthi FCA First Division
- 2025–26: Xanthi FCA First Division, 8th

Iraklis Neos Zygos Football Club (Greek: Ηρακλής Νέου Ζυγού) is a Greek football club based in Neos Zygos, Xanthi, Greece.

== Honours ==
=== Domestic ===
  - Xanthi FCA Champions: 2
    - 2010–11, 2018–19
  - Xanthi FCA Cup Winners: 1
    - 2014–15
