= Pyrasos F.C. =

Pyrasos
- Full name: Athlitikos Syllogos Pyrasos Nea Anchialos
- Founded: 1952; 74 years ago
- Ground: Nea Anchialos Municipal Stadium
- Capacity: 300
- Chairman: Dimitris Karnavatloglou
- Manager: Dimitris Frangoulis
- League: Thessaly FCA First Division
- 2025–26: Thessaly FCA First Division, 5th
- Website: https://pyrasos.com/
Home colours	Away colours	Third colours

Pyrasos F.C. is a Greek football club, based in Nea Anchialos, Magnesia.

The club was founded in 1952. They played in Gamma Ethniki for the two seasons 2014-15 and 2015–16.

== Honors ==
=== Domestic Titles and honors ===
  - Thessaly FCA First Division: 4
    - 2007–08, 2012–13, 2013–14, 2021–22
  - Thessaly FCA Second Division: 2
    - 1972–73, 1989–90
  - Thessaly FCA Cup: 4
    - 1974–75, 2009–10, 2013–14, 2021–22
