= Niki Tragano F.C. =

Greek football club

Niki Tragano
- Full name: A.P.O. Niki Tragano
- Founded: 1980
- Ground: Tragano Municipal Stadium
- Chairman: Petros Kolorotouros
- Manager: Spyridon Antonopoulos

Niki Tragano Football Club is a Greek football club, based in Tragano, Elis, Greece.

== Honours ==
=== Domestic ===
  - Elis FCA champion: 1
    - 2017–18
  - Elis FCA Cup Winners: 1
    - 2013–14
