= Diagoras Vrachnaiika F.C. =

Diagoras Vrachnaiika
- Founded: 1960; 66 years ago
- Ground: Vrachnaiika Municipal Stadium
- Chairman: Konstantinos Papadopoulos
- Manager: Alexandros Charakidas
- League: Achaea FCA First Division
- 2025–26: Achaea FCA First Division, 5th

Diagoras Vrachnaiika Football Club (Greek: Α.Ο. Διαγόρας Βραχνέικων) is a Greek football club based in Vrachnaiika, Achaea, Greece.

== Honours ==
=== Domestic ===
  - Achaea FCA Champions: 3
    - 2007–08, 2013–14, 2016–17
  - Achaea FCA Cup Winners: 2
    - 2011–12, 2017–18
  - Achaea FCA Super Cup Winners: 5
    - 2012, 2014, 2017, 2018, 2022
