= Keravnos Perni F.C. =

Greek association football club

Keravnos Perni
- Full name: Gymnastikos Athlitikos Syllogos Keravnos Perni
- Founded: 1977; 48 years ago
- Ground: Municipal Stadium of Chrysoupoli
- Capacity: 5,000
- Chairman: Theodoros Alexandropoulos
- Manager: Ioannis Malamatas
- League: Kavala FCA
- 2019–20: Gamma Ethniki, 10th (relegated)

Keravnos Perni Football Club (Greek: Γ.Α.Σ. Κεραυνός Πέρνης) is a Greek football club, based in Perni, Kavala, Greece.

== Honours ==
=== Domestic ===
- Kavala FCA Champions: 2
  - 2013–14, 2017–18
- Kavala FCA Cup Winners: 1
  - 2016–17
