= Achaea Football Clubs Association =

Association football governing body in Achaea Prefecture, Greece

- Full name: Achaea Football Clubs Association; Greek: Ένωση Ποδοσφαιρικών Σωματείων Αχαΐας
- Short name: Achaea F.C.A.; Greek: Ε.Π.Σ. Αχαΐας
- Founded: 1927; 99 years ago
- Headquarters: Patras, Greece
- FIFA affiliation: Hellenic Football Federation
- President: Aggelos Daniil
- Website: epsachaias.gr

Achaea Football Clubs Association (Greek: Ένωση Ποδοσφαιρικών Σωματείων Αχαΐας) is one of the oldest amateur association football governing bodies, representing teams from Achaea Prefecture.

== History ==
It was founded in 1927 in Patras. Members included teams from the prefectures of Aetolia-Acarnania, Elis, Cephalonia and Zakynthos. Aetolia-Acarnania established its own association in 1969, Elis and Zakynthos in 1971, and Cephalonia in 1975.

Founding members of the association were the teams:

- Panachaiki
- Olympiakos Patras
- Apollon Patras
- Thyella Patras
- Lefkos Asteras Patras
- Iraklis Pyrgos
- Aris Aitoliko

== Organization ==
The association is a member of Hellenic Football Federation and organizes a regional football league and cup. It currently represents 700 football players and 156 amateur men's football clubs (126 of which are active).

Six of these football clubs are playing in national leagues. The only women's football club of Achaia F.C.A. is playing in the first national league.

The football clubs are separated in four leagues:

- Achaia F.C.A. A League (16 clubs)
- Achaia F.C.A. A1 League (18 clubs)
- Achaia F.C.A. B League (41 clubs in three divisions)
- Achaia F.C.A. C league (24 clubs in three divisions)

== International participation ==
Achaia F.C.A. eliminated the collective teams of other amateur Greek leagues in 2005, thus representing Greece in the UEFA Regions' Cup in Budapest (UEFA's top amateur competition where only one team composed of players from one amateur domestic league can qualify).

== List of champions ==
as first Greece level championship

- 1924 Panachaiki
- 1925 Panachaiki
- 1926 Olympiakos Patras
- 1927 Olympiakos Patras
- 1929 Panachaiki
- 1930 Panachaiki
- 1931 Panachaiki
- 1934 Panachaiki
- 1935 ΑΕΚ Patras
- 1936 Panachaiki
- 1940 Olympiakos Patras
- 1944 Achilleas Patras
- 1945 Apollon Patras
- 1946 Apollon Patras
- 1947 Apollon Patras
- 1948 Apollon Patras
- 1949 Panachaiki
- 1950 Olympiakos Patras
- 1951 Thyella Patras
- 1952 Thyella Patras
- 1953 Thyella Patras
- 1954 Panachaiki
- 1955 Panachaiki
- 1956 Panachaiki
- 1957 Panachaiki
- 1958 Panachaiki
- 1959 Panachaiki

as second Greece level championship

- 1960 Olympiakos Patras
- 1961 Panachaiki
- 1962 Panachaiki

as third Greece level championship

- 1963 Thyella Patras
- 1964 Patraikos
- 1965 Olympiakos Patras
- 1966 Patraikos
- 1967 Iraklis Patras
- 1968 A.C. Patras
- 1969 Panegialios
- 1970 Patreas
- 1971 Achaiki
- 1972 Elpida Eglikada Patras
- 1973 Thyella Patras
- 1974 Α.C. Patras
- 1975 Aris Patras
- 1976 Panegialios
- 1977 Panegialios

as fourth Greece level championship

- 1978 Achaiki
- 1979 Agios Dimitrios
- 1980 AEK Patras
- 1981 Ethnikos Patras
- 1982 ΑΕΚ Patras

as fifth Greece level championship

- 1983 Aris Patras
- 1984 Thyella Patras
- 1985 Aris Patras
- 1986 Thyella Patras
- 1987 Ethnikos Patras
- 1988 Thyella Patras
- 1989 Panegialios
- 1990 Astrapi Psarofai
- 1991 Ethnikos Sageika
- 1992 Zavlani
- 1993 Atromitos Patras
- 1994 Pigasos Patras
- 1995 Aris Patras
- 1996 Ethnikos Patras
- 1997 Achilleas Patras
- 1998 Ethnikos Sageika
- 1999 Panathinaikos Patras
- 2000 Ethnikos Patras
- 2001 Thyella Patras
- 2002 Diakopto
- 2003 Fostiras Ovria
- 2004 Astrapi Psarofai
- 2005 Zavlani
- 2006 Atromitos Lappas
- 2007 Achilleas Kamares
- 2008 Diagoras Vrachnaiika
- 2009 Ethnikos Sageika
- 2010 Tritaios
- 2011 Thyella
- 2012 Ethnikos Sageika
- 2013 Anagennisi Patras
- 2014 Diagoras Vrachnaiika
- 2015 Keravnos Agios Vasilios
- 2016 Achaiki
- 2017 Diagoras Vrachnaiika
- 2018 Panmovriakos
- 2019 Thyella Patras
- 2020 Panegialios
- 2021 cancelled
- 2022 APS Patras
- 2023 Panegialios
- 2024 Atromitos Patras
- 2025 Thyella Patras
- 2026 Atromitos Patras

=== Cup Achaea ===
- 1972: Aris Patras
- 1973: Thyella Patras
- 1974: Ethnikos Patras
- 1975: Ethnikos Sageika
- 1976: Ethnikos Sageika
- 1977: Achaiki
- 1978: Aris Patras
- 1979: Achaiki
- 1980: Achaiki
- 1981: Ethikos Aegion
- 1982: A.C. Patras
- 1983: A.C. Patras
- 1984: A.C. Patras
- 1985: Ethnikos Patras
- 1986: A.C. Patras
- 1987: Zavlani
- 1988: A.C. Patras
- 1989: Achaiki
- 1990: A.C. Patras
- 1991: Aris Patras
- 1992: Astrapi Psarofai
- 1993: Aris Patras
- 1994: Panegialios
- 1995: A.C. Patras
- 1996: Ethnikos Patras
- 1997: Achaiki
- 1998: Doxa Chalandritsa
- 1999: Ethnikos Patras
- 2000: Patraikos
- 2001: Cyprus Patras
- 2002: Aris Patras
- 2003: Aris Patras
- 2004: Zavlani
- 2005: Fostiras Ovria
- 2006: Zavlani
- 2007: Panegialios
- 2008: Achilleas Kamares
- 2009: Panegialios
- 2010: Atromitos Lappa
- 2011: Tritaiikos
- 2012: Diagoras Vrachnaiika
- 2013: Atromitos Lappa
- 2014: Anagennisi Patras
- 2015: Aris Patras
- 2016: Keravnos Agios Vasilios
- 2017: Keravnos Agios Vasilios
- 2018: Diagoras Vrachnaiika
- 2019: Atromitos Patras
- 2020: Atromitos Patras (not counted)
- 2021: abandoned due to COVID-19
- 2022: Diagoras Vrachnaiika
- 2023: A.C. Patras
- 2024: Thyella Patras
- 2025: Aris Patras
- 2026: Panegialios

=== Super Cup Achaea ===
- 2003 Aris Patras – Fostiras Ovria 3–0
- 2006 Atromitos Lappas – Zavlani 2–0
- 2007 Panegialios – Anagenissi/Aias Sympoliteia 8–2
- 2008 Achilleas Kamares – Diagoras Vrachneika 1–0
- 2009: Ethnikos Sageika – Panaigialeios 0–0 (4–2 pen.)
- 2010: Tritaiikos – Atromitos Lappa 4–2
- 2011: Tritaiikos – Thyella 1–0

== Teams in national divisions ==
Three teams participate in national divisions in the 2026–27 season :

- Gamma Ethniki:
  - Atromitos Patras
  - Panachaiki
  - Panegialios

== Sources ==
- Greece – List of Regional Champions
