= Thessaly Football Clubs Association =

Association football governing body in Magnesia Prefecture, Greece

- Full name: Thessaly Football Clubs Association; Greek: Ένωση Ποδοσφαιρικών Σωματείων Θεσσαλίας
- Short name: Thessaly F.C.A.; Greek: Ε.Π.Σ. Θεσσαλίας
- Founded: 1929; 97 years ago
- Headquarters: Volos, Greece
- FIFA affiliation: Hellenic Football Federation
- President: Miltiadis Kalogiros
- Website: epsth.gr

Thessaly Football Clubs Association (Greek: Ένωση Ποδοσφαιρικών Σωματείων Θεσσαλίας) is a association football organization in Magnesia Prefecture that is member of the Hellenic Football Federation. The champions of the TFCA are promoted to the Gamma Ethniki, while the cup winner plays in the Greek Amateur Cup.

== History ==
Thessaly F.C.A. was founded in 1929 with its headquarters in Volos and the main power took part in soccer clubs throughout Thessaly. Later on, it founded separate association for three other prefectures: Larissa, Trikala and Karditsa. During the decaded of 1960s and early 1970s those sub-associations broke away and formed their own.

The TCA has around 50 clubs divided into three divisions, but also supervises junior, youth and women's championships in Magnesia. It is one of the oldest local federations in Greece, thus it kept its original name despite the fact that it only covers football in the Magnesia area and not in the whole region of Thessaly.

== Champions ==
Year	Winner
1971	Rigas Feraios Velestino
1972	Dimitra Trikala
1973	Rigas Feraios Velestino
1974	Rigas Feraios Velestino
1975	Rigas Feraios Velestino
1976	Niki Volos
1977	Rigas Feraios Velestino
1978	GS Almyros
1979	Sarakinos Volos
1980	Toxotis Volos
1981	Rigas Feraios Velestino
1982	Magnisiakos
1983	Kentavros Volos
1984	GS Almyros
1986	Magnisiakos
1987	Aris Melissatiko
1988	Kentavros Volos
1989	GS Almyros
1990	Iraklis Volos
1991	Sarakinos Volos
1992	Theseus Agria
1993	Dafni Volos
1994	Iraklis Volos
1995	Rigas Feraios Velestino
1996	GS Almyros
1997	Skiathos
1998	GS Almyros
1999	Iraklis Volos
2000	Kentavros Volos
2001	GS Almyros
2002	Kentavros Volos
2003	Magnisiakos
2004	GS Almyros
2005	Theseus Agria
2006	Asteras Rizomilos
2007	Theseus Agria
2008	Pyrasos
2009	Diminio Iason-Keravnos
2010	Rigas Feraios Velestino
2011	GS Almyros
2012	A.C. Rigas Feraios Velestino
2013	Pyrasos
2014	Pyrasos
2015	GS Almyros
2016	Iraklis Volos
2017	GS Almyros
2018	Theseus Agria
2019	Diagoras Stefanovikeio
2020	Dimitra Efxeinoupoli
2021	not concluded
2022	Pyrasos
2023	Magnisiakos
2024	Olympiacos Volos
2025	Sarakinos Volos
2026	Rigas Feraios Velestino

=== Performance by club ===
Club	Titles	Season
Rigas Feraios Velestino	10	1971, 1973, 1974, 1975, 1977, 1981, 1995, 2010, 2012, 2026
GS Almyros	10	1978, 1984, 1989, 1996, 1998, 2001, 2004, 2011, 2015, 2017
Kentavros Volos	4	1983, 1988, 2000, 2002
Iraklis Volos	4	1990, 1994, 1999, 2016
Theseus Agria	4	1992, 2005, 2007, 2018
Pyrasos	4	2008, 2013, 2014, 2022
Magnisiakos	4	1982, 1986, 2003, 2023
Sarakinos Volos	3	1979, 1991, 2025
Dimitra Trikala	1	1972
Niki Volos	1	1976
Toxotis Volos	1	1980
Aris Melissatiko	1	1987
Dafni Volos	1	1993
Skiathos	1	1997
Asteras Rizomilos	1	2006
Diminio Iason-Keravnos	1	2009
Diagoras Stefanovikeio	1	2019
Dimitra Efxeinoupoli	1	2020
Olympiacos Volos	1	2024

== Teams in national divisions ==
Seven teams participate in national divisions in the 2026–27 season :

- Super League 1:
  - Volos
- Super League 2:
  - Niki Volos
- Gamma Ethniki:
  - Sarakinos Volos
  - Rigas Feraios Velestino
- First Women's Division:
  - Volos
- Women's Gamma Ethniki
  - Volos 2004
