= Lerna (municipal unit) =

Lerna Λέρνα
- Municipal unit
- Location within the regional unit

- Location within Greece
- Coordinates: 37°33′N 22°43′E
- Country: Greece
- Administrative region: Peloponnese
- Regional unit: Argolis
- Municipality: Argos-Mykines

Area
  - Municipal unit: 84.285 km^{2} (32.543 sq mi)
- Elevation: 29 m (95 ft)

Population (2021)
  - Municipal unit: 2,747
  - Municipal unit density: 32.59/km^{2} (84.41/sq mi)
- Time zone: UTC+2 (EET)
  - Summer (DST): UTC+3 (EEST)
- Postal code: 212 00
- Area code: 27510
- Vehicle registration: AP

Lerna (Greek: Λέρνα) is a former municipality in Argolis, Peloponnese, Greece. Since the 2011 local government reform, it has been part of the municipality Argos-Mykines, of which it is a municipal unit. The municipal unit has an area of 84.285 km^{2}. The seat of the municipality was Myloi.

== Historical population ==
Year	Population
1991	2,742
2001	3,042
2011	2,319
2021	2,747
