= Anagennisi Triglia F.C. =

Association football club in Greece

Anagennisi Triglia
- Short name: Triglia
- Founded: 1952; 74 years ago
- Ground: Nea Triglia Municipal Stadium
- Capacity: 5,000
- Chairman: Zafeiris Lillis
- Manager: Tasos Karapostolou
- League: Chalkidiki FCA First Division
- 2025–26: Chalkidiki FCA First Division, 6th
Home colours	Away colours

Anagennisi Triglia (Greek: Αναγέννηση Τρίγλιας), is a professional football club based in Triglia, Chalkidiki, Greece.

Former crest (2019–2021)

== Honours ==
=== Domestic ===
- Chalkidiki F.C.A. Championship
  - Winners (6): 1982–83, 1987–88, 1990–91, 2001–02, 2003–04, 2017–18
- Chalkidiki F.C.A. Cup
  - Winners (9): 1981–82, 1984–85, 1986–87, 1987–88, 1988–89, 1991–92, 2003–04, 2016–17, 2018–19
