= Palliniakos F.C. =

Greek football club

Palliniakos
- Founded: 1939; 87 years ago
- Ground: Pallini Municipal Stadium
- Chairman: Eleftherios Theocharis
- Manager: Athanasios Savourdos
- League: East Attica FCA First Division
- 2025–26: East Attica FCA First Division, 6th
- Website: http://www.palliniakosfc.gr/

Palliniakos Football Club (Greek: Α.Ο. Παλληνιακός) is a Greek football club based in Pallini, East Attica, Greece.

== Honours ==
=== Domestic ===
  - East Attica FCA champion: 1
    - 2017–18
