= Almyros F.C. =

Almyros
- Founded: 1929; 97 years ago
- Ground: Almyros Municipal Stadium
- Capacity: 2,000
- Chairman: Athanasios Chatzikyriakos
- Manager: Nikos Voulgaris
- League: Thessaly FCA First Division
- 2025–26: Thessaly FCA First Division, 4th
Home colours	Away colours

Almyros Football Club (Greek: Γ.Σ. Αλμυρού) is a Greek football club, based in Almyros, Magnesia, Greece

== History ==
Almyros is based in the city of Almyros in the Magnesia Prefecture. The statute of the association was approved by the decision of the Multimodal Court of First Instance of Volos in 599/1929. Salty for many means refugees so the stadium is in the so-called refugees where the refugees from Asia Minor settled. The Asia Minors carried their own culture and madness from the city, and over time they had ghettoized the neighborhood around the court, and over the years the nickname Bronx came out of the famous and dangerous New York neighborhood.

== Honours ==
=== Domestic ===
  - Thessaly FCA Champions: 11
    - 1965–66, 1977–78, 1983–84, 1988–89, 1995–96, 1997–98, 2000–01, 2003–04, 2010–11, 2014–15, 2016–17
  - Thessaly FCA Cup Winners: 10
    - 1971–72, 1972–73, 1973–74, 1977–78, 1978–79, 1987–88, 1990–91, 1992–93, 1996–97, 2016–17
