= Agria =

Agria Αγριά
- Municipal unit
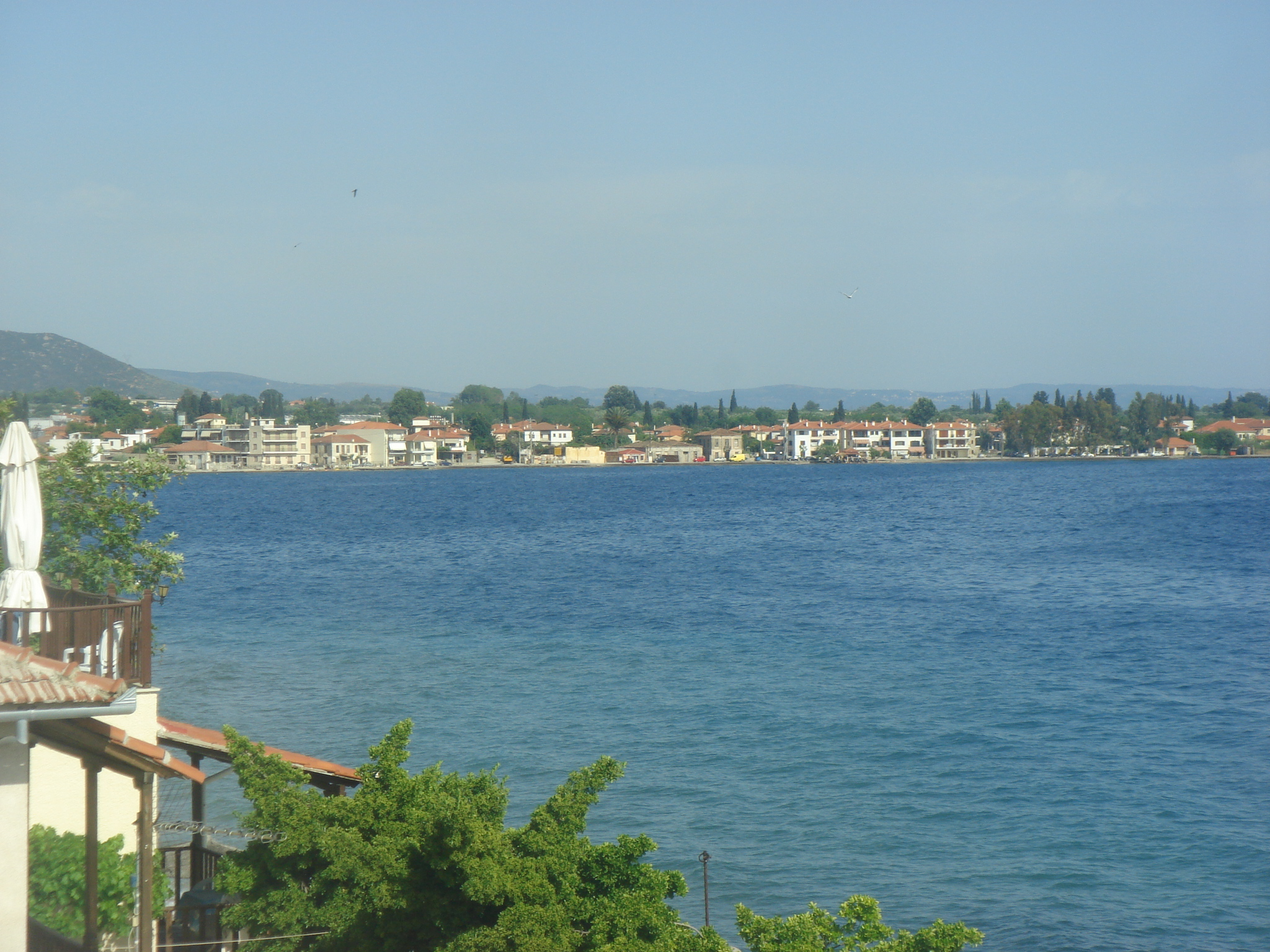

- Location within the regional unit

- Location within Greece
- Coordinates: 39°20′N 23°02′E
- Country: Greece
- Administrative region: Thessaly
- Regional unit: Magnesia
- Municipality: Volos

Area
  - Municipal unit: 25.2 km^{2} (9.7 sq mi)

Population (2021)
  - Municipal unit: 5,295
  - Municipal unit density: 210/km^{2} (544/sq mi)
  - Community: 4,928
- Time zone: UTC+2 (EET)
  - Summer (DST): UTC+3 (EEST)
- Postal code: 373 00
- Area code: 2428
- Vehicle registration: ΒΟ

Agria (Greek: Αγριά) is a town and a former municipality in Magnesia, Thessaly, Greece. Since the 2011 local government reform it is part of the municipality Volos, of which it is a municipal unit. The municipal unit has an area of 25.227 km^{2}. It lies on the Pelion peninsula about 7 km from Volos.

== Name ==
There are some different opinions about the town's name. Some believe that the name comes from wild olive trees (Agrielies) (Αγριελιές), or a small plant named "Agriada" (Greek: Αγριάδα). A scholar named Patroklos Palamidas from the nearby village of Lechonia said that the name originated from an ancient temple, which existed in the region and was dedicated to Agrea Dimitra (Greek: Αγραία Δήμητρα).

== Ottoman occupation (1423-1881) ==
During the Turkish occupation in Agria there were few settlements such as a hostel for caravans and a toll station. However, houses were built in the early 19th century, before the Revolution of 1821. It is a relatively new town (the community was established in 1912). The area formerly belonged to the villages of Drakia and Agios Laurentios, a port from which these and other villages distributed agricultural and craft products.

== Economic growth ==
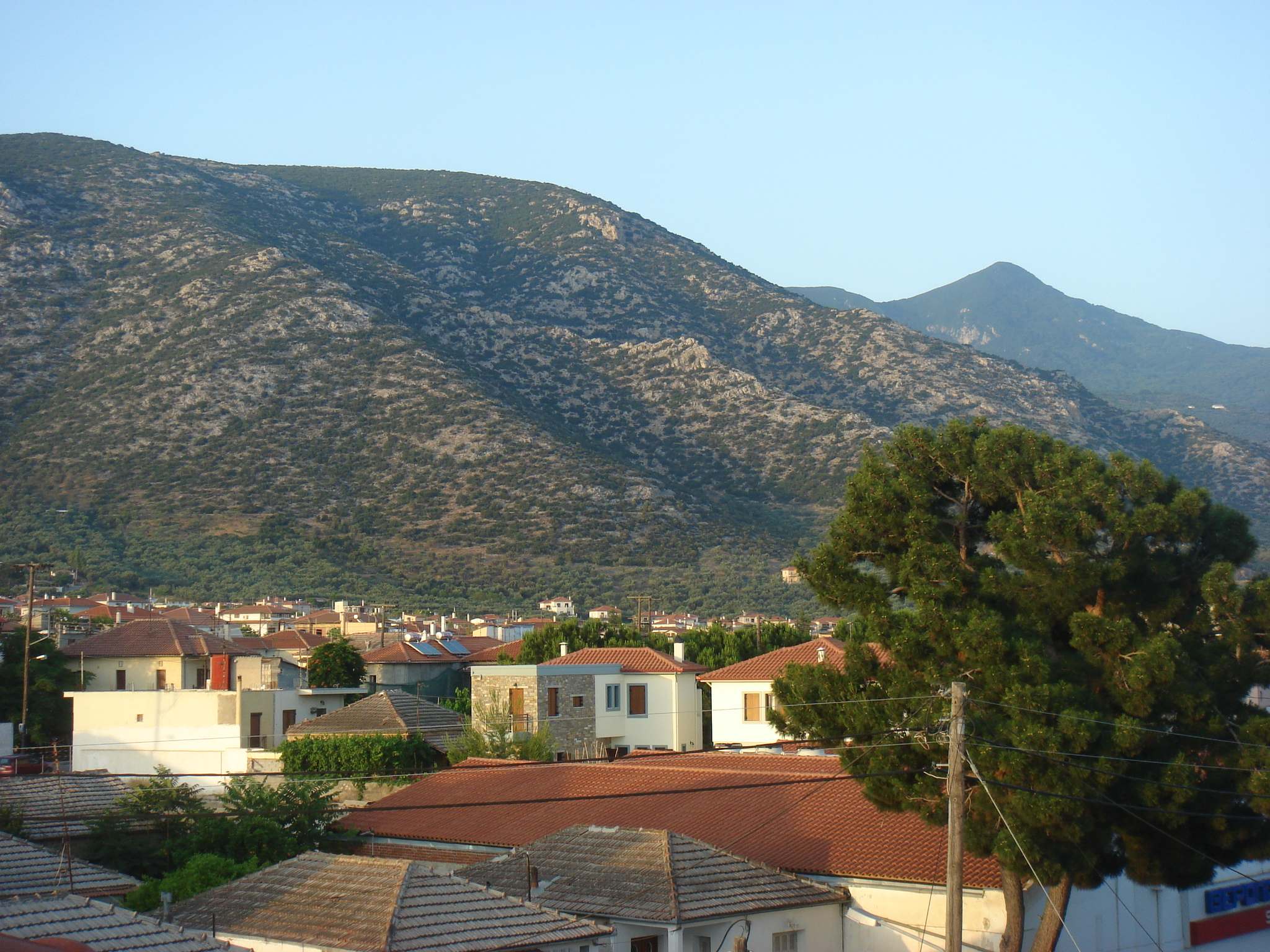
Panoramic view.

From 1809 - 1860 companies were created that exported local crafts and copper to Western Europe, Romania, and Russia.

Agria started to grow rapidly after the annexation of Thessaly from the Turks, and with the construction of a coastal road and rail network during 1895 that connected Volos to the southwestern villages of Pelion, which exported sea fruit, oil, and black olives from the bay.

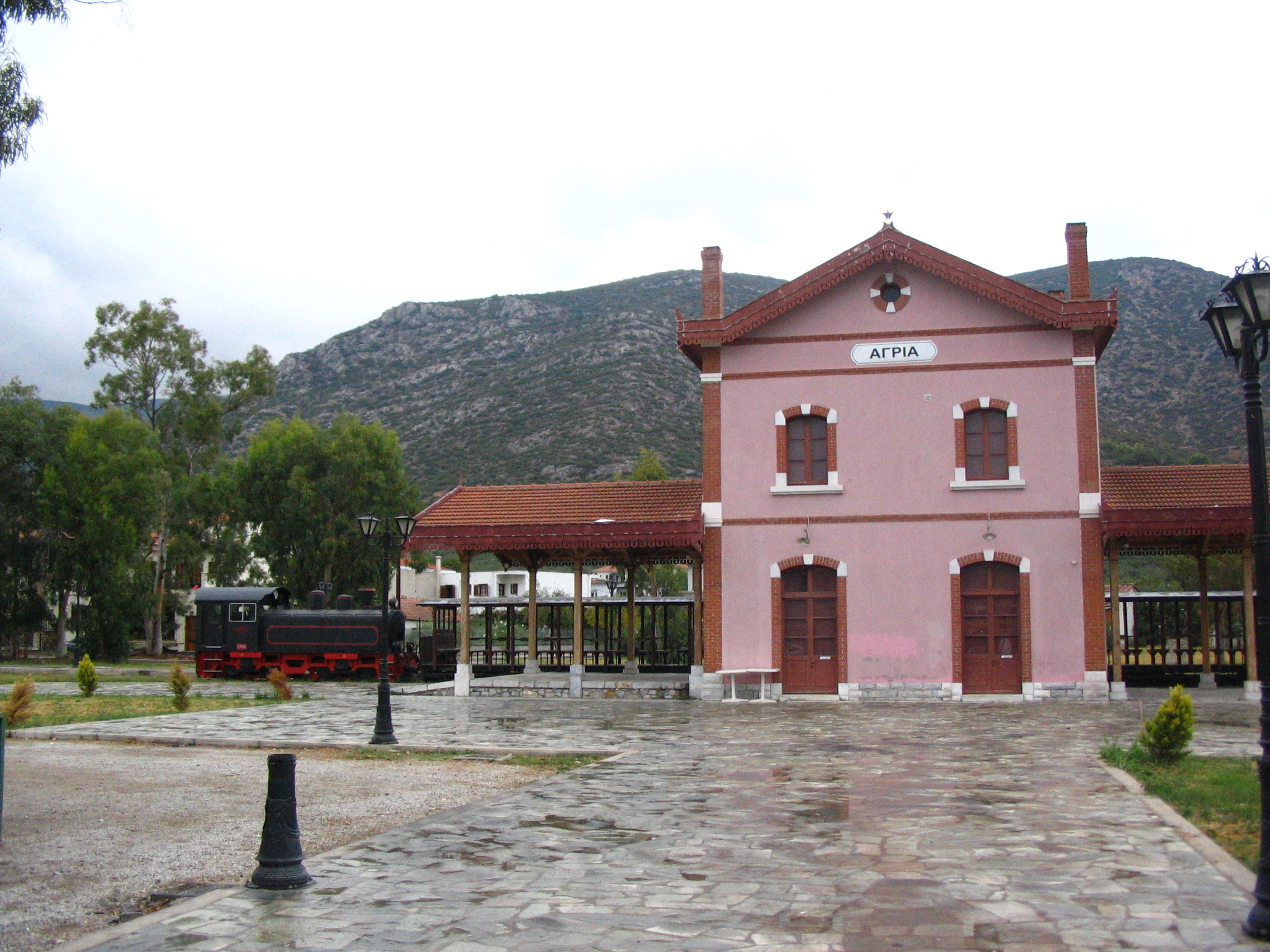
The train station.

In 1911 the cement plant A.G.E.T HERCULES (Greek: Α.Γ.Ε.Τ ΗΡΑΚΛΗΣ) was founded there. The plant occupies a natural harbor and is among the largest cement producers in Europe, Asia, and America.

In 1920 an English commercial paper stated that Agria was «the largest port in the world» with reference to their exports of olives and oil. Around two hundred thousand kilos (200 tons) of table olives are exported annually from Agria.

A new wave of residents moved to Agria in 1922 when refugees from Asia Minor, mainly Eastern Thrace, took shelter there after their expulsion from their home land.

20th century Agria saw population and industrial growth. The famous EPSA (Greek: ΕΨΑ) founded in 1924 by the Kosmadopoulos brothers, who owned a bank, built a refrigerated fruit and ice plant. The overproduction of lemons in the already developed movement of traditional lemonade from Asia Minor sellers, leading owners to recruit a German engineer for running drink bottling plant. The legend is the German engineer has discovered a rare recipe for the production of lemonade, recipe still used today is unchanged and the company's stock.

Other local businesses were founded and flourished then as the factories of packaging and trade of olives, the wood processing industry which was originally craft construction barrels and the modernization of the industry turned to woodworking and furniture at the same time. Other smaller companies also mostly oil warehouses - have begun to operate and attract people to Agria.

== WWII Italian and German occupation (1941-1944) ==
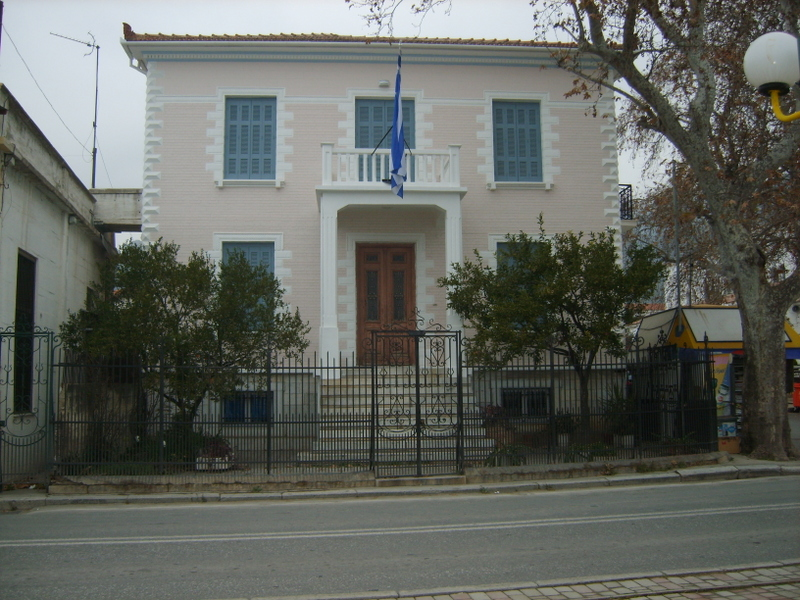
WWII administration.

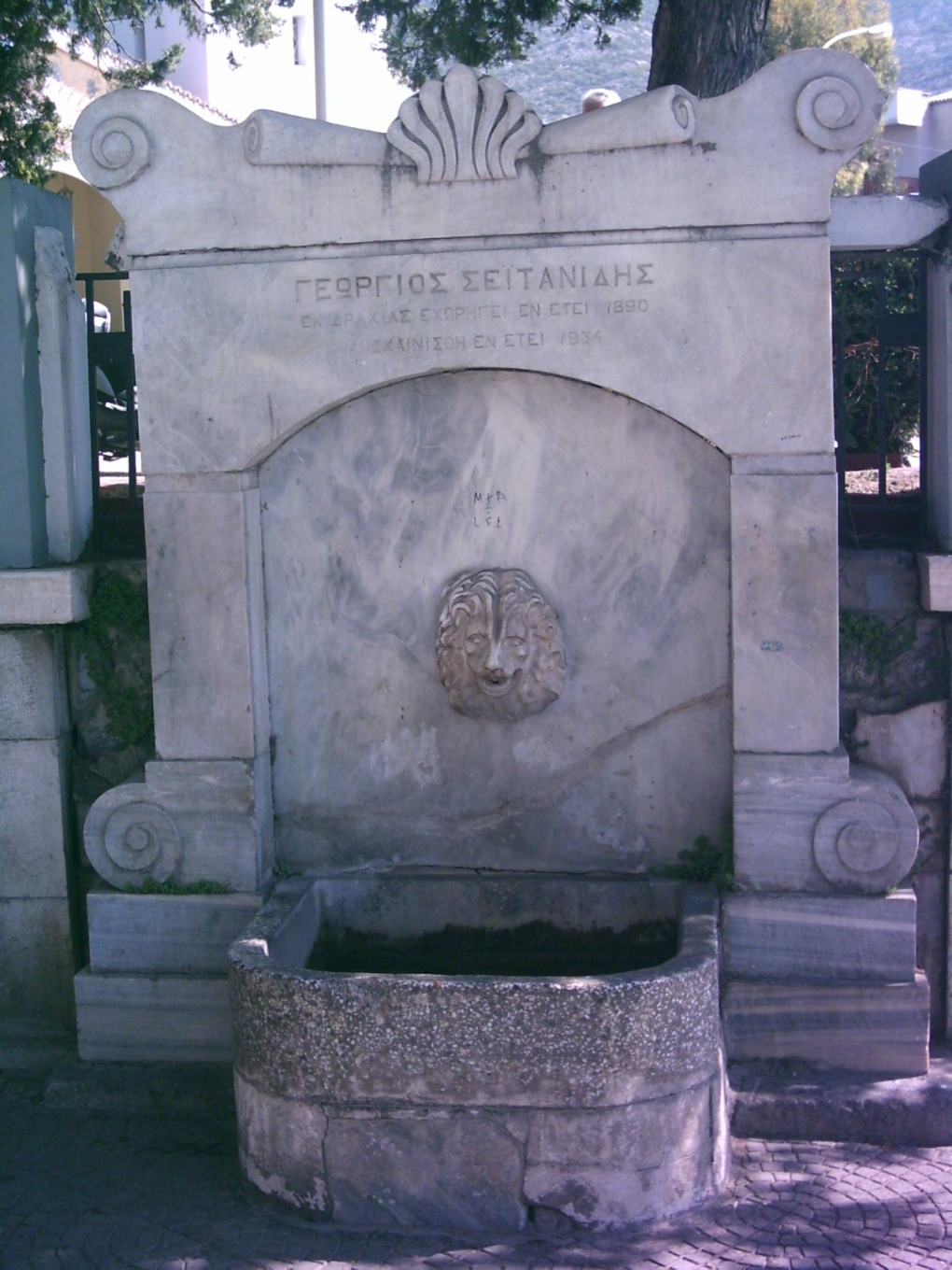
A fountain of Agria. The crack on this water tap came from a bullet of a German soldiers rifle.

From June 1941 until September 1943 the village was base for the Italian occupation forces. From October 1943 until September 1944 Agria was the home and base for operations of a company of the 4th Polizei Waffen SS field engineers, the 16th Coy SS Pz. Gren. Rgt 8. The commanders building still exists. It is a neoclassical house located at the center of Agria next to the church of Saint George (Agios Georgios).

== Tourism ==
In the summer months it becomes a popular tourist destination. The large boulevard at Agria and at nearby Soutrali beach are good for swimming. The chapels of Timios Stavros, Panaghia Goritsa and Panaghia Tripa, built within the rocks, are remarkable for their beauty and simplicity. At the end of July exhibitions of popular art and local dances take place. Also in the middle of summer when there is a new moon there is a celebration in honor of the fishermen (psaradiki vradia) where fresh kakavia (traditional fish soup) is served. The area used to have many olive groves which, unfortunately enough, have now mainly been replaced by modern buildings.

== Notable people ==
- Vangelis (1943–2022), composer
