= 2014–15 Iraklis F.C. season =

G.S. Iraklis Thessalonikis 2014–15 association football season

Iraklis
2014–15 season
- President: Theodoros Papadopoulos (until 21 August 2014); Spyros Papathanasakis (since 21 August 2014)
- Manager: Nikos Papadopoulos
- Stadium: Kaftanzoglio Stadium
- Football League: 2nd
- Greek Football Cup: Semi-finals
- Top goalscorer: League: Giannis Loukinas (15); All: Giannis Loukinas (15)
| Home colours | Away colours | Third colours |

The 2014–2015 season was Iraklis third consecutive season in the Football League and fourth overall. In the league the club finished first in the North Group and gained entrance to the promotion playoffs. In the playoffs, Iraklis finished in the second position, gaining promotion to the Super League, after 4 years in the lower divisions. In the Greek Cup Iraklis was eliminated by Skoda Xanthi in the semi-finals.

Giannis Loukinas was Iraklis' topscorer in the league and overall, with 15 goals. Diego Romano and Pavlos Kyriakidis led the club's scoring in the cup, with 2 goals each. Huanderson had the most league appearances for Iraklis, starting all 32 league matches he played. Diego Romano and Nikos Pourtoulidis played in all 11 cup matches of the club. Huanderson and Pourtoulidis were tied for most overall appearances in the season, making 41 each.

== Players ==
=== First team ===
| No. | Name | Nationality | Position | Date of birth (age) | Signed from | Signed in | Apps. | Goals |
Goalkeepers
| 1 | Huanderson Junior da Silva Santos | (Brazil) | GK | 3 August 1983 (aged 30) | Rio Ave | 2012 | 59 | 0 |
| 13 | Panagiotis Ladas | (Greece) | GK | 26 August 1994 (aged 19) | Asteras Tripolis | 2014 | 0 | 0 |
| 32 | Spyros Papathanasiou | (Greece) | GK | 12 February 1992 (aged 22) | Ethnikos Gazoros | 2014 | 0 | 0 |
Defenders
| 2 | Michalis Boukouvalas | (Greece) | RB | 14 January 1988 (aged 26) | Kerkyra | 2013 | 34 | 1 |
| 3 | Giorgos Saramantas | (Greece) | LB | 29 January 1992 (aged 22) | Paniliakos | 2014 | 0 | 0 |
| 4 | Nikos Ziabaris | (Greece) | CB | 18 February 1991 (aged 23) | Fostiras | 2014 | 0 | 0 |
| 16 | Dimitris Toskas | (Greece) | CB | 13 March 1991 (aged 23) | Panionios | 2014 | 0 | 0 |
| 20 | Giorgos Smiltos | (Greece) | CB | 7 October 1992 (aged 21) | Panetolikos | 2014 | 0 | 0 |
| 21 | Giorgos Valerianos | (Greece) | LB | 13 February 1992 (aged 22) | Kavala | 2014 | 0 | 0 |
| 22 | Sebastián Bartolini | (Argentina) (Italy) | CB | 1 February 1982 (aged 32) | Asteras Tripolis | 2014 | 0 | 0 |
| 26 | Asterios Mouchalis | (Greece) | RB | 4 February 1997 (aged 17) | Iraklis academy | 2014 | 0 | 0 |
Midfielders
| 5 | Dimitris Stamou | (Greece) | DM/CB | 27 April 1991 (aged 23) | PAOK | 2014 | 3 | 0 |
| 6 | Hassoma Bino Bamba | (Ivory Coast) | DM | 21 December 1990 (aged 23) | | 2013 | 21 | 0 |
| 8 | Lefteris Intzoglou | (Greece) | AM | 3 March 1987 (aged 27) | Doxa Drama | 2013 | 32 | 1 |
| 10 | Diego Romano | (Argentina) | CM | 11 March 1980 (aged 34) | Ergotelis | 2014 | 0 | 0 |
| 11 | Nikos Pourtoulidis (Captain) | (Greece) | DM | 7 October 1983 (aged 30) | Niki Volos | 2013 | 38 | 7 |
| 12 | Savvas Siatravanis | (Greece) | AM | 24 November 1992 (aged 21) | AEL | 2013 | 47 | 7 |
| 14 | Giannis Pasas | (Greece) | LM | 7 October 1990 (aged 23) | Panetolikos | 2014 | 0 | 0 |
| 15 | Emmanuel Zambazis | (Canada) (Greece) | CM | 24 April 1997 (aged 17) | Vaughan Soccer Club | 2014 | 0 | 0 |
| 17 | Miltos Stefanidis | (Greece) | MF | 7 November 1991 (aged 22) | Iraklis academy | 2014 | 0 | 0 |
| 19 | Pavlos Kyriakidis | (Greece) | AM | 3 September 1991 (aged 22) | Zakynthos | 2014 | 0 | 0 |
| 23 | Paschalis Kassos | (Greece) | RW | 7 November 1991 (aged 22) | Doxa Drama | 2014 | 0 | 0 |
Forwards
| 7 | Kosmas Tsilianidis | (Greece) | RW/LW | 9 May 1994 (aged 20) | Iraklis Academy | 2011 | 44 | 7 |
| 9 | Emanuel Perrone | (Argentina) (Italy) | FW | 14 June 1983 (aged 31) | AEL Kalloni | 2014 | 0 | 0 |
| 25 | Giannis Loukinas | (Greece) | FW | 20 September 1991 (aged 22) | Chania | 2014 | 0 | 0 |
| 91 | Nikos Aggeloudis | (Greece) | FW | 14 May 1991 (aged 23) | Aris | 2014 | 0 | 0 |

== Transfers ==
=== In ===
==== Summer ====
| Date | Player | From | Fee | Source |
|---|---|---|---|---|
| 1 July 2014 | (Greece) Asterios Mouchalis | (Greece) Iraklis academy | – | |
| 9 July 2014 | (Greece) Giorgos Smiltos | (Greece) Panetolikos | Free | |
| 10 July 2014 | (Greece) Giannis Pasas | (Greece) Panetolikos | Free | |
| 10 July 2014 | (Greece) Giorgos Saramantas | (Greece) Paniliakos | Free | |
| 10 July 2014 | (Greece) Giannis Loukinas | (Greece) Chania | Free | |
| 14 July 2014 | (Greece) Nikos Ziabaris | (Greece) Fostiras | Free | |
| 15 July 2014 | (Argentina) (Italy) Emanuel Perrone | (Greece) AEL Kalloni | Free | |
| 21 July 2014 | (Argentina) Diego Romano | (Greece) Ergotelis | Free | |
| 22 July 2014 | (Greece) Giorgos Valerianos | (Greece) Kavala | Free | |
| 22 July 2014 | (Greece) Pavlos Kyriakidis | (Greece) Zakynthos | Free | |
| 29 July 2014 | (Greece) Dimitris Stamou | (Greece) PAOK | Free | |
| 29 July 2014 | (Greece) Spyros Papathanasiou | (Greece) Ethnikos Gazoros | Free | |
| 1 August 2014 | (Canada) (Greece) Emmanuel Zambazis | (Canada) Vaughan Soccer Club | Free | |
| 1 August 2014 | (Argentina) (Italy) Sebastián Bartolini | (Greece) Asteras Tripolis | Free | |
| 7 August 2014 | (Greece) Dimitris Toskas | (Greece) Panionios | Free | |
| 19 August 2014 | (Greece) Paschalis Kassos | (Greece) Doxa Drama | Free | |
| 19 August 2014 | (Greece) Panagiotis Ladas | (Greece) Asteras Tripolis | Free | |
| 19 August 2014 | (Greece) Miltos Stefanidis | (Greece) Iraklis academy | – | |
| 23 August 2014 | (Greece) Nikos Aggeloudis | (Greece) Aris | Free | |

==== Winter ====
| Date | Player | From | Fee | Source |
|---|---|---|---|---|
| 30 December 2014 | (Greece) Serafeim Giannikoglou | (Greece) Fokikos | Free | |
| 8 January 2015 | (Greece) Ilias Tsiliggiris | (Greece) AEL | Free | |
| 26 January 2015 | (Greece) Aristotelis Karasalidis | (Greece) Niki Volos | Free | |
| 4 February 2015 | (Greece) Anestis Karakostas | (Greece) Niki Volos | Free | |
| 9 February 2015 | (Greece) Konstantinos Rougalas | (Greece) Olympiakos | Free | |

=== Out ===
==== Summer ====
| Date | Player | To | Fee | Source |
|---|---|---|---|---|
| 1 July 2014 | (Greece) Theofilos Kouroupis | (Greece) Apollon Kalamarias | Free | |
| 1 July 2014 | (Croatia) Dario Zahora | – | Free | |
| 1 July 2014 | (Albania) (Greece) Enea Koliqi | Olympiacos Volos | Free | |
| 1 July 2014 | (Uruguay) (Italy) Enzo Scorza | – | Free | |
| 1 July 2014 | (Greece) Fotis Kipouros | (Greece) Kampaniakos | Free | |
| 1 July 2014 | (Greece) Giorgos Paligiorgos | (Greece) Tyrnavos | Free | |
| 3 July 2014 | (Nigeria) Benjamin Onwuachi | (Romania) Oțelul Galați | Free | |
| 9 July 2014 | (Greece) Georgios Apostolidis | (Greece) Kampaniakos | Free | |
| 9 July 2014 | (Greece) Dimitris Kontodimos | (Greece) AEL | Free | |
| 11 July 2014 | (Greece) Petros Konteon | (Greece) Chania | Free | |
| 15 July 2014 | (Greece) Lefteris Matsoukas | (Greece) Fostiras | Free | |
| 23 July 2014 | (Portugal) Vítor Lima | (Portugal) Famalicão | Free | |
| 30 July 2014 | (Brazil) (Spain) Tai | (Serbia) Napredak Kruševac | Free | |
| 6 August 2014 | (Greece) Charalambos Sarafoglou | (Greece) Iraklis Ambelokipi | Free | |
| 6 August 2014 | (Greece) Stefanos Kragiopoulos | (Greece) Iraklis Ambelokipi | Free | |
| 10 September 2014 | (Greece) Giorgos Chionidis | (Greece) Iraklis Ambelokipi | Free | |
| 12 September 2014 | (Greece) Angelos Papasterianos | (Greece) Apollon Kalamarias | Free | |

==== Winter ====
| Date | Player | To | Fee | Source |
|---|---|---|---|---|
| 2 February 2015 | (Greece) Giorgos Smiltos | (Greece) Kissamikos | Loan | |
| 4 February 2015 | (Ivory Coast) Hassoma Bino Bamba | (Greece) Apollon Kalamarias | Free | |

== Club ==
=== Coaching staff ===
| Position | Staff |
|---|---|
| Head coach | (Greece) Nikos Papadopoulos |
| Assistant coach | (Greece) |
| General manager | (Greece) Giorgos Karaiskos |
| Technical director | (Greece) Pavlos Miroforidis |
| Physical trainer | (Greece) Vassilis Kalapotharakos |
| Goalkeeper trainer | (Greece) Fotios Gizelis |
| Doctor | (Greece) Manolis Papakostas |
| Physiotherapist | (Greece) Konstantinos Tsiolakidis |
| Care taker | (Greece) Georgios Siagas |
| Youth team manager | (Greece) Pagonis Vakalopoulos |
| Academy director | (Greece) Savvas Kofidis |

Last updated: August 2014

=== Other information ===
| Chairman | (Canada) Spiros Papathanasakis |
| Vice President | (Greece) |
| Team Director | (Greece) |
| Marketing Director | (Greece) Nikos Gramenos |
| Press Secretary | (Greece) Theodoros Papadopoulos |
| Secretary | (Greece) Eva Galanopoulou |
| Ground (capacity and dimensions) | Kaftanzoglio Stadium (28,028 / 68x105 m) |
| Training ground | Mikra Training Center |

=== Kit ===
Supplier: Blue Line
Sponsor(s): OPAP

| Home | Away | Third kit |

== Pre-season and friendlies ==
| 6 August 2014 | Iraklis | 2–1 | Kallithea | Karpenisi |
| 18:30 EEST | Kassos 5'; Boukouvalas (yellow card) 44'; Brilakis 52' (o.g.) | Report | Pitaras (yellow card) 40'; Jordi Vidal (yellow card) 65'; Vertzitzoglou 74' |

| 10 August 2014 | Iraklis | 1–1 | Chania | Karpenisi |
| 18:30 EEST | Konteon 89' (o.g.) | Report | Konteon 37' |

| 13 August 2014 | Iraklis | 0–1 | Apollon Smyrnis | Karpenisi |
| 18:30 EEST | | Report | Gonzalez (yellow card) 9'; Kyvelidis 23'; Georgiou (yellow card) 40' |

| 17 August 2014 | Dotieas Agias | 0–0 | Iraklis | Agia |
| 18:45 EEST | | Report | | Stadium: Municipal Stadium of Agia |

| 17 August 2014 | Pierikos | 1–0 | Iraklis | Katerini |
| 18:00 EEST | Manikas 19'; Kontoulis (red card) 90' | Report | | Stadium: Municipal Stadium of Katerini |

| 28 September 2014 | Apollon Kalamarias | 2–3 | Iraklis | Kalamaria |
| 16:00 EEST | Natsiopoulos 21'; Efstathiou 33'; Qose (yellow card) 90' | Report | Aggeloudis 6'; Pasas 72'; Kyriakidis 87' | Stadium: Kalamaria Stadium; Referee: Dimitris Kouroulis (Thessaloniki) |

| 22 November 2014 | Skoda Xanthi | 0–2 | Iraklis | Pigadia, Xanthi |
| 15:00 EEST | | Report | Perrone 18'; Loukinas 76' | Stadium: Skoda Xanthi Arena; Referee: Giorgos Kaznaferis |

== Football League ==
=== League table ===
| Pos | Team | Pld | W | D | L | GF | GA | GD | Pts | Qualification or relegation |
|---|---|---|---|---|---|---|---|---|---|---|
| 1 | Iraklis (Q) | 24 | 17 | 6 | 1 | 34 | 8 | +26 | 57 | Qualification to promotion play-offs |
| 2 | AEL (Q) | 24 | 14 | 3 | 7 | 27 | 11 | +16 | 45 | Qualification to promotion play-offs |
| 3 | Olympiacos Volos (Q) | 24 | 14 | 3 | 7 | 33 | 21 | +12 | 45 | Qualification to promotion play-offs |
| 4 | Lamia | 24 | 12 | 7 | 5 | 24 | 17 | +7 | 43 | |
| 5 | Zakynthos (Q) | 24 | 11 | 6 | 7 | 26 | 27 | −1 | 39 | Qualification to relegation play-offs |

Source: Football League
Rules for classification: 1) points, 2) head-to-head points
(Q) Qualified for the phase indicated

==== Results summary ====
| Overall | | | | | | | | Home | | | | | | Away | | | | | |
| Pld | W | D | L | GF | GA | GD | Pts | W | D | L | GF | GA | GD | W | D | L | GF | GA | GD |
|---|---|---|---|---|---|---|---|---|---|---|---|---|---|---|---|---|---|---|---|
| 24 | 17 | 6 | 1 | 34 | 8 | +26 | 57 | 8 | 3 | 1 | 17 | 4 | +13 | 9 | 3 | 0 | 17 | 4 | +13 |

Last updated: 5 April 2015.
Source: Competitive matches

==== Results by round ====
| Round | 1 | 2 | 3 | 4 | 5 | 6 | 7 | 8 | 9 | 10 | 11 | 12 | 13 | 14 | 15 | 16 | 17 | 18 | 19 | 20 | 21 | 22 | 23 | 24 | 25 | 26 |
|---|---|---|---|---|---|---|---|---|---|---|---|---|---|---|---|---|---|---|---|---|---|---|---|---|---|---|
| Ground | A | H | A | A | — | A | H | A | H | H | A | H | A | H | A | H | H | — | H | A | H | A | A | H | A | H |
| Result | W | W | W | W | — | W | D | W | W | D | W | W | W | D | W | W | W | — | W | W | W | D | D | W | D | L |
| Position | 3 | 3 | 1 | 1 | 2 | 2 | 2 | 2 | 2 | 2 | 2 | 1 | 1 | 1 | 1 | 1 | 1 | 1 | 1 | 1 | 1 | 1 | 1 | 1 | 1 | 1 |

A = Away; H = Home; W = Win; D = Draw; L = Loss

==== Matches ====
| 12 October 2014 1 | Pierikos | 0–1 | Iraklis | Katerini |
| 16:00 EEST | Eliomar (yellow card) 44' | Report; Live TV: OTE Sport | Stamou (yellow card) 39'; Perrone 52', (yellow card) 64'; Aggeloudis (yellow card) 78' | Stadium: Municipal Stadium of Katerini; Referee: Thanasis Tzilos (Larissa) |

| 20 October 2014 2 | Iraklis | 1–0 | Olympiacos Volos | Thessaloniki |
| 18:00 EEST | Perrone (yellow card) 16', (goal) 66'; Tsilianidis (yellow card) 31'; Intzoglou (yellow card) 58'; Stamou (yellow card) 69'; Boukouvalas (yellow card) 90+4' | Report; Live TV: OTE Sport | Margaritis (yellow card) 9'; Makrydimitris (yellow card) 58'; Dieguito (yellow card) 73'; Pinares (yellow card) 75'; Diamantopoulos (yellow card) 85' | Stadium: Kaftanzoglio; Referee: Georgios Tzovaras (Phthiotis) |

| 25 October 2014 3 | Tyrnavos | 0–2 | Iraklis | Larissa |
| 16:00 EEST | Ivanidis (yellow card) 16'; Pechlivanopoulos (yellow card) 36' (yellow-red card) 51'; Solferino (yellow card) 38'; Paligiorgos (yellow card) 61'; Sterianos (yellow card) 64' | Report | Stamou (yellow card) 30'; Loukinas 31', 74'; Intzoglou (yellow card) 39' | Stadium: Alcazar Stadium; Referee: Konstantinos Balatsoukas (Thesprotia) |

| 3 November 2014 4 | Aiginiakos | 1–2 | Iraklis | Aiginio |
| 15:00 EET | Zourkos (yellow card) 23'; Fabinho (yellow card) 81'; Liolios (yellow card) 83'; Kazakis 89' | Report; Live TV: OTE Sport | Loukinas 10', 14'; Saramantas (yellow card) 45'; Pasas (yellow card) 58' | Stadium: Municipal Stadium of Aiginio; Referee: Dionisios Zougras (Kozani) |

| 5 | v |
Note: Iraklis has a day off

| 28 November 2014 6 | Fokikos | 0–1 | Iraklis | Amfissa |
| 18:00 EET | Saine (yellow card) 31'; Dabos (yellow card) 56'; Gacesa (yellow card) 74'; Revithopoulos (yellow card) 87' | Report; Live TV: OTE Sport | Perrone 32'; Pasas (yellow card) 52'; Pourtoulidis (yellow card) 90+6' | Stadium: Amfissa Municipal Stadium; Referee: Konstantinos Antoniou |

| 5 December 2014 7 | Iraklis | 0–0 | Ethnikos Gazoros | Thessaloniki |
| 18:00 EET | Toskas (yellow card) 12'; Perrone (yellow card) 90+6' | Report; Live TV: OTE Sport | Tsouvaltsidis (yellow card) 15'; Savvidis (yellow card) 37'; Koukolis (yellow card) 65'; Plavoukos (yellow card) 89' | Stadium: Kaftanzoglio; Referee: Ioannis Blounas |

| 12 December 2014 8 | Anagennisi Karditsa | 0–4 | Iraklis | Karditsa |
| 18:00 EET | Voutsias (yellow card) 34'; Nikic (yellow card) 51'; Papargyriou (yellow card) 68'; Gougoudis (red card) 86' | Report; Live TV: OTE Sport | Tsilianidis 12'; Kassos 14'; Perrone 61'; Pourtoulidis (yellow card) 65', (goal) 87' (pen.) | Stadium: Karditsa Stadium; Referee: Athanasios Sezos |

| 17 December 2014 9 | Iraklis | 2–0 | Zakynthos | Thessaloniki |
| 16:00 EET | Saramantas (yellow card) 55'; Boukouvalas (yellow card) 66'; Bartolini 72'; Loukinas 90+1' | Report; Live TV: OTE Sport | Krčmarević (yellow card) 29'; Pittaras (yellow card) 62'; Efthimiadis (yellow card) 67'; Tsopelas (yellow card) 85' | Stadium: Kaftanzoglio; Referee: Alexandros Katsikogiannis |

| 21 December 2014 10 | Iraklis | 0–0 | Lamia | Thessaloniki |
| 16:00 EET | Siatravanis (yellow card) 38'; Romano (yellow card) 53'; Saramantas (yellow card) 77'; Pourtoulidis (yellow card) 83' | Report; Live TV: OTE Sport | Vasilogiannis (yellow card) 17'; Kostopoulos (yellow card) 23'; Gurma (yellow card) 34'; Mumin (yellow card) 54'; Tsamouris (yellow card) 88'; Blažić (yellow card) 90+2' | Stadium: Kaftanzoglio; Referee: Georgios Foukakis |

| 4 January 2015 11 | Apollon Kalamarias | 0–1 | Iraklis | Kalamaria |
| 16:00 EET | Kapetanos (yellow card) 21'; Akassou (yellow card) 31'; Galanopoulos (yellow card) 42'; Oliseh (red card) 89' | Report; Live TV: OTE Sport | Perrone (yellow card) 10'; Kassos (yellow card) 24'; Bartolini (yellow card) 67'; Siatravanis 69'; Romano (yellow card) 89'; Stamou (yellow card) 90+1' | Stadium: Kalamaria Stadium |

| 11 January 2015 12 | Iraklis | 1–0 | Agrotikos Asteras | Thessaloniki |
| 15:00 EET | Kassos 9'; Pourtoulidis (yellow card) 16' | Report | Peev (yellow card) 60'; Palaskas (yellow card) 88' | Stadium: Kaftanzoglio |

| 17 January 2015 13 | AEL | 0–1 | Iraklis | Larissa |
| 17:00 EET | Melissas (yellow card) 24'; Billa (yellow card) 27'; Souanis (yellow card) 57' | Report; Live TV: OTE Sport | Pourtoulidis 25' (pen.); Boukouvalas (yellow card) 30'; Siatravanis (yellow card) 66'; Saramantas (yellow card) 81' | Stadium: Alcazar Stadium |

| 24 January 2015 14 | Iraklis | 2–2 | Pierikos | Thessaloniki |
| 19:00 EET | Romano 3', 14'; Ziabaris (yellow card) 19' | Report; Live TV: OTE Sport | Mystakidis 77', (yellow card) 90'; Baxevanou 86' | Stadium: Kaftanzoglio; Referee: Alexandros Katsikogiannis |

| 1 February 2015 15 | Olympiacos Volos | 0–1 | Iraklis | Volos |
| 18:00 EET | Zeris (yellow card) 11'; Kiziridis (yellow card) 22'; Gialousis (yellow card) 45+2' | Report; Live TV: OTE Sport | Kyriakidis 8'; Bartolini (yellow card) 21' (yellow-red card) 71'; Boukouvalas (yellow card) 23'; Intzoglou (yellow card) 34'; Stamou (yellow card) 66' | Stadium: Volos Municipal Stadium; Referee: Apostolos Simeakis |

| 6 February 2015 16 | Iraklis | 3–0 | Tyrnavos | Thessaloniki |
| 18:00 EET | Perrone (yellow card) 19'; Tsiliggiris 45'; Boukouvalas (yellow card) 56'; Kassos 66'; Pasas (yellow card) 87'; Loukinas 89' | Report; Live TV: OTE Sport | Milutinović (yellow card) 41' | Stadium: Kaftanzoglio; Referee: Dimitrios Karantonis |

| 16 February 2015 17 | Iraklis | 2–1 | Aiginiakos | Thessaloniki |
| 18:00 EET | Kyriakidis 26', (yellow card) 44'; Pasas 89' | Report; Live TV: OTE Sport | Polyzos (yellow card) 15'; Fabinho (yellow card) 21'; Welcome (yellow card) 35'; Giazitzoglou 54', (yellow card) 88'; Penta (yellow card) 56'; Kazakis (yellow card) 79'; Barros (yellow card) 90+3' | Stadium: Kaftanzoglio; Referee: Dimitrios Maloutas |

| 18 | v |
Note: Iraklis has a day off

| 25 February 2015 19 | Iraklis | 1–0 | Fokikos | Thessaloniki |
| 15:00 EET | Bartolini (yellow card) 20'; Tsilianidis 29'; Valerianos (yellow card) 66'; Aggeloudis (yellow card) 78' | Report | Zacharopoulos (yellow card) 15'; Chantakias (yellow card) 38'; Skaribas (yellow card) 81' | Stadium: Kaftanzoglio; Referee: Evangelos Kiotzenis |

| 1 March 2015 20 | Ethnikos Gazoros | 0–1 | Iraklis | Serres |
| 15:00 EET | Savvidis (yellow card) 48'; Kofokotsios (yellow card) 67'; Kroustalelis (yellow card) 82' | Report; Live TV: OTE Sport | Saramantas (yellow card) 22'; Karassalidis 25'; Kassos (yellow card) 80' | Stadium: Serres Municipal Stadium; Referee: Manolis Skoulas |

| 8 March 2015 21 | Iraklis | 2–0 | Anagennisi Karditsa | Thessaloniki |
| 18:00 EET | Loukinas 47', 56'; Bartolini (yellow card) 53' | Report; Live TV: OTE Sport | Fotias (yellow card) 51'; Mavrias (yellow card) 79' | Stadium: Kaftanzoglio; Referee: Panagiotis Simeonidis |

| 15 March 2015 22 | Zakynthos | 1–1 | Iraklis | Zakynthos |
| 15:00 EET | Ikonomou (yellow card) 13'; Bletsas (yellow card) 50'; Król 59'; Krčmarević (yellow card) 66'; Kallivokas (yellow card) 90+4' | Report; Live TV: OTE Sport | Pourtoulidis 52'; Kassos (yellow card) 58'; Intzoglou (yellow card) 62'; Tsiliggiris (yellow card) 90+1' | Stadium: Zakynthians Olympic Champions Ground; Referee: Aristidis Vatsios |

| 18 March 2015 23 | Lamia | 1–1 | Iraklis | Lamia |
| 18:00 EET | Delekos 14', (yellow card) 30'; Fatjon (yellow card) 36'; Antonopoulos (yellow card) 87' | Report; Live TV: OTE Sport | Valerianos (yellow card) 19'; Bartolini (yellow card) 58'; Loukinas 69' | Stadium: Lamia Municipal Stadium; Referee: Aristotelis Diamantopoulos |

| 22 March 2015 24 | Iraklis | 3–0 | Apollon Kalamarias | Thessaloniki |
| 16:00 EET | Ziabaris 32'; Siatravanis 70'; Tsilianidis 89' | Report; Live TV: OTE Sport | Kostoulas (yellow card) 31'; Katsiaros (yellow card) 45+2'; Akassou (yellow card) 45+2' (yellow-red card) 90+1'; Panagiotoudis (yellow card) 46' | Stadium: Kaftanzoglio; Referee: Ioannis Mourtzakis |

| 28 March 2015 25 | Agrotikos Asteras | 1–1 | Iraklis | Thessaloniki |
| 15:00 EET | Pato 59'; Karantasiadis (yellow card) 79'; Samouilidis (yellow card) 81' | Report | Saramantas (yellow card) 43'; Loukinas 77' | Stadium: Agrotikos Asteras Ground; Referee: Nikolaos Papageorgiou |

| 5 April 2015 26 | Iraklis | 0–1 | AEL | Thessaloniki |
| 15:00 EET | Perrone (penalty missed) 90+7' | Report | Banousis (yellow card) 11'; Kontodimos (yellow card) 59'; Delizisis (yellow card) 59' (yellow-red card) 90+5'; Giantsis 83', (yellow card) 90'; Karanikas (yellow card) 90'; Apostolidis (yellow card) 90+1'; Nebegleras (yellow card) 90+6' | Stadium: Kaftanzoglio; Referee: Konstantinos Antoniou |

=== Promotion play-offs ===
==== Matches ====
| 26 April 2015 1 | Iraklis | 2–1 | AEK Athens | Thessaloniki |
| 18:00 EET | Perrone (yellow card) 4', (goal) 34'; Pasas 12'; Romano (yellow card) 37'; Intzoglou (yellow card) 45' | Report; Live TV: OTE Sport | Zorić (yellow card) 24'; Aravidis 27'; Barbosa (yellow card) 65' | Stadium: Kaftanzoglio; Referee: Alexandros Aretopoulos |

| 4 May 2015 2 | Olympiacos Volos | 0–1 | Iraklis | Volos |
| 18:00 EET | Rokas (yellow card) 56'; Intzidis (yellow card) 77'; Triantafilakos (yellow card) 85' | Report; Live TV: OTE Sport | Ziabaris (yellow card) 40'; Loukinas 55' | Stadium: Volos Municipal Stadium; Referee: Dimitrios Thanos |

| 9 May 2015 3 | Iraklis | 2–0 | Panachaiki | Thessaloniki |
| 18:00 EET | Pourtoulidis 41' (pen.), 81'; Tsilianidis (yellow card) 72' | Report; Live TV: OTE Sport | Alla (yellow card) 16'; Asigba (yellow card) 18'; Anastasopoulos (yellow card) 34'; Georgakopoulos (yellow card) 40'; Bountopoulos (yellow card) 56'; Fourlanos (yellow card) 58' | Stadium: Kaftanzoglio; Referee: Gerasimos Ditsios |

| 13 May 2015 4 | Apollon Smyrnis | 1–0 | Iraklis | Athens |
| 18:00 EET | Farinola (yellow card) 22'; Lagos 60'; Wanderson (yellow card) 69'; Golias (yellow card) 86'; Iraklis (yellow card) 89' | Report; Live TV: OTE Sport | Romano (yellow card) 23'; Intzoglou (yellow card) 45'; Karassalidis (yellow card) 58'; Loukinas (yellow card) 65' | Stadium: Georgios Kamaras Stadium; Referee: Georgios Kizas |

| 20 May 2015 5 | Iraklis | 1–0 | AEL | Thessaloniki |
| 19:00 EET | Loukinas 74', (yellow card) 75'; Huanderson (yellow card) 88' | Report; Live TV: OTE Sport | Karanikas (yellow card) 28'; Jone (yellow card) 71'; Melissas (yellow card) 83' | Stadium: Kaftanzoglio; Referee: Alexandros Dimitropoulos |

| 25 May 2015 6 | AEK Athens | 1–0 | Iraklis | Athens |
| 18:00 EET | Aravidis (yellow card) 26'; Anakoglou (yellow card) 43', (goal) 59'; Barbosa (yellow card) 43'; Georgeas (yellow card) 88'; Platellas (yellow card) 90' | Report; Live TV: OTE Sport | Ziabaris (yellow card) 8'; Intzoglou (yellow card) 30' | Stadium: Olympic Stadium; Referee: Anastasios Sidiropoulos |

| 31 May 2015 7 | Iraklis | 1–0 | Olympiacos Volos | Thessaloniki |
| 19:00 EET | Loukinas 4'; Boukouvalas (yellow card) 90' | Report | Triantafilakos (yellow card) 78' | Stadium: Kaftanzoglio; Referee: Stavros Mantalos |

| 3 June 2015 8 | Panachaiki | 1–1 | Iraklis | Corinth |
| 19:00 EET | Anastasopoulos 28'; Asigba (yellow card) 38' (yellow-red card) 66'; Kargas (yellow card) 65' | | Loukinas 7'; Siatravanis (yellow card) 60'; Pourtoulidis (yellow card) 63'; Kyriakidis (yellow card) 69'; Bartolini (yellow card) 83' | Stadium: Municipal Stadium of Corinth; Referee: Aristomenis Koutsiaftis |

| 7 June 2015 9 | Iraklis | 0–1 | Apollon Smyrnis | Thessaloniki |
| 19:00 EET | Tsilianidis (penalty missed) 64'; Loukinas (yellow card) 71' | Report | Angulo 56'; Lagos (yellow card) 62'; Georgiou (red card) 63'; Wanderson (yellow card) 69'; Souanis (yellow card) 76' | Stadium: Kaftanzoglio; Referee: Evangelos Kiotzenis |

| 10 June 2015 10 | AEL | 0–2 | Iraklis | Larissa |
| 18:00 EET | | Live TV: OTE Sport | Loukinas 11'; Kassos (yellow card) 14', (goal) 16' | Stadium: Alcazar Stadium; Referee: Angelos Evangelou |

== Greek Cup ==
=== First round ===
| 29 August 2014 First leg | Iraklis | 1–0 | Lamia | Thessaloniki |
| 18:00 EEST | Perrone 44' (pen.), (yellow card) 90+2'; Siatravanis (yellow card) 56' | Report; Live TV: OTE Sport | Ćurjurić (yellow card) 8'; Fatjion (yellow card) 26'; Georgiou (red card) 41' | Stadium: Kaftanzoglio Stadium; Referee: Panagiotis Symeonidis (Pieria) |

| 12 September 2014 Second leg | Lamia | 2–1 (2 – 2 a agg.) | Iraklis | Lamia |
| 17:00 EEST | Maric (yellow card) 12'; Kamara (yellow card) 51'; Neofytos 42'; Frangos (yellow card) 77'; Yenga 78' (pen.); Ćurjurić (yellow card) 90+2' | Report; Live TV: OTE Sport | Ziabaris (yellow card) 77'; Huanderson (yellow card) 77'; Toskas 15' | Stadium: Lamia Municipal Stadium; Referee: Thanasis Tzilos (Larissa) |

=== Second Round (Group D) ===
| Pos | Team | Pld | W | D | L | GF | GA | GD | Pts | Qualification | LEV | IRA | PLA | ETH |
|---|---|---|---|---|---|---|---|---|---|---|---|---|---|---|
| 1 | Levadiakos | 3 | 2 | 1 | 0 | 5 | 1 | +4 | 7 | Round of 16 | | — | 2–0 | — |
| 2 | Iraklis | 3 | 1 | 2 | 0 | 3 | 2 | +1 | 5 | Round of 16 | 1–1 | | — | — |
| 3 | Platanias | 3 | 1 | 1 | 1 | 3 | 3 | 0 | 4 | | — | — | | 3–1 |
| 4 | Ethnikos Gazoros | 3 | 0 | 0 | 3 | 2 | 7 | −5 | 0 | | 0–2 | 1–2 | — | |

Source: epo.gr

| 23 September 2014 1 | Iraklis | 1–1 | Levadiakos | Thessaloniki |
| 16:30 EEST | Siatravanis 9'; Romano (yellow card) 55' (yellow-red card) 90+4'; Intzoglou (yellow card) 64'; Perrone (yellow card) 71' | Report; Live TV: OTE Sport | Bordagaray 60', (yellow card) 68'; Sotelo (yellow card) 65'; Skembis (yellow card) 74'; Mangas (yellow card) 90+5' | Stadium: Kaftanzoglio; Referee: Giorogs Kyzas (Drama) |

| 28 October 2014 2 | Ethnikos Gazoros | 1–2 | Iraklis | Serres |
| 17:15 EET | Koukolis (yellow card) 48' (yellow-red card) 81'; Tsouvaltsidis 55' | Report; Live TV: OTE Sport | Kyriakidis 6'; Toskas (yellow card) 16'; Pasas 23', (yellow card) 83'; Bartolini (yellow card) 41' (yellow-red card) 73'; Valerianos (yellow card) 45'; Ladas (yellow card) 90+1' | Stadium: Serres Municipal Stadium; Referee: Evangelos Gratsanis (Trikala) |

| 7 January 2015 3 | Platanias | 0–0 | Iraklis | Chania |
| 15:00 EET | Zaradoukas (yellow card) 40'; Apostolopoulos (yellow card) 79'; Nazlidis (yellow card) 86' | Report; Live TV: OTE Sport | Intzoglou (yellow card) 24'; Pasas (yellow card) 43'; Stamou (yellow card) 45'; Tsilianidis (yellow card) 56'; Bartolini (yellow card) 86' | Stadium: Perivolia Municipal Stadium; Referee: Marios Labropoulos |

=== Third round ===
| 21 January 2015 First leg | Iraklis | 1–1 | Asteras Tripolis | Thessaloniki |
| 17:15 EET | Stamou (yellow card) 59'; Kyriakidis 79' | Report; Live TV: OTE Sport | Rolle (yellow card) 25'; Goian 49' | Stadium: Kaftanzoglio; Referee: Stavros Mantalos |

| 27 January 2015 Second leg | Asteras Tripolis | 0–1 (1–2 agg.) | Iraklis | Tripoli |
| 19:30 EET | | Report; Live TV: OTE Sport | Intzoglou (yellow card) 26'; Romano 56' | Stadium: Theodoros Kolokotronis Stadium; Referee: Dimitrios Thanos |

=== Quarter-finals ===
| 11 February 2015 First leg | Iraklis | 2–0 | Panionios | Thessaloniki |
| 16:00 EET | Korbos 15' (o.g.); Bartolini (yellow card) 22'; Perrone (yellow card) 55' Report; Romano 74', (yellow card) 76'; Loukinas (yellow card) 79' | Report; Live TV: OTE Sport | Masouras (yellow card) 9'; Katharios (yellow card) 57'; Pantidos (yellow card) 63'; Korbos (yellow card) 73'; Mitropoulos (yellow card) 87'; Risvanis (yellow card) 90'; Papadopoulos (yellow card) 90+3' | Stadium: Kaftanzoglio; Referee: Aristomenis Koutsiaftis |

| 4 March 2015 Second leg | Panionios | 2–0 (a.e.t.) (2–2 agg.) (3–4 p) | Iraklis | Athens |
| 19:00 EET | Kolovos 19' (pen.); Giannou (yellow card) 20'; Boumale 45+2'; Mitropoulos (yellow card) 46' (yellow-red card) 66'; Ikonomou (yellow card) 61'; Fountas (yellow card) 90+2'; Gezos (yellow card) 104' | Live TV: OTE Sport | Boukouvalas (yellow card) 17'; Huanderson (yellow card) 18'; Bartolini (yellow card) 20'; Perrone (yellow card) 48' (yellow-red card) 74'; Ziabaris (yellow card) 70'; Loukinas (yellow card) 90+10'; Saramantas (yellow card) 117' | Stadium: Nea Smyrni Stadium; Referee: Stefanos Mantakis |
| | Penalties |
| | Ikonomou (penalty missed); Gezos (penalty scored); Fountas (penalty scored); Giannou (penalty scored); Kolovos (penalty missed); Korbos (penalty missed) | | (penalty missed) Romano; (penalty scored) Kyriakidis; (penalty scored) Huanderson; (penalty missed) Ziabaris; (penalty scored) Pourtoulidis; (penalty scored) Tsilianidis |

=== Semi-finals ===
| 9 April 2015 First leg | Iraklis | 0–1 | Skoda Xanthi | Thessaloniki |
| 17:00 EEST | | Report | Cleyton 7' | Stadium: Kaftanzoglio; Referee: Christos Mitsios |

| 29 April 2015 Second leg | Skoda Xanthi | 0–0 (1–0 agg.) | Iraklis | Xanthi |
| 21:30 EEST | Kapetanos (yellow card) 3'; Soltani (yellow card) 41'; Ranos (yellow card) 56' | Report; Live TV: OTE Sport | Romano (yellow card) 5' (yellow-red card) 59'; Ziabaris (yellow card) 10'; Perrone (yellow card) 21'; Pasas (yellow card) 53'; Kyriakidis (yellow card) 90+6' | Stadium: Skoda Xanthi Arena; Referee: Dimitrios Styliaras |

== Statistics ==
=== Appearances and goals ===
| No. | Pos | Nat | Player | Total | | Football League | | Greek Cup | |
| No. | Pos | Nat | Player | Apps | Goals | Apps | Goals | Apps | Goals |
|---|---|---|---|---|---|---|---|---|---|
| 1 | GK | (Brazil) BRA | Huanderson | 41 | 0 | 32+0 | 0 | 9+0 | 0 |
| 2 | DF | (Greece) GRE | Michalis Boukouvalas | 40 | 0 | 30+0 | 0 | 9+1 | 0 |
| 3 | DF | (Greece) GRE | Giorgos Saramantas | 33 | 0 | 25+0 | 0 | 8+0 | 0 |
| 4 | DF | (Greece) GRE | Aristotelis Karassalidis | 14 | 1 | 6+6 | 1 | 1+1 | 0 |
| 5 | MF | (Greece) GRE | Dimitris Stamou | 22 | 0 | 12+2 | 0 | 7+1 | 0 |
| 7 | MF | (Greece) GRE | Kosmas Tsilianidis | 32 | 3 | 19+7 | 3 | 5+1 | 0 |
| 8 | MF | (Greece) GRE | Lefteris Intzoglou | 38 | 0 | 29+0 | 0 | 9+0 | 0 |
| 9 | FW | (Argentina) ARG | Emanuel Perrone | 31 | 6 | 16+6 | 5 | 9+0 | 1 |
| 10 | MF | (Argentina) ARG | Diego Romano | 38 | 4 | 23+4 | 2 | 8+3 | 2 |
| 11 | MF | (Greece) GRE | Nikos Pourtoulidis | 41 | 5 | 30+0 | 5 | 9+2 | 0 |
| 12 | MF | (Greece) GRE | Savvas Siatravanis | 28 | 3 | 15+8 | 2 | 4+1 | 1 |
| 13 | GK | (Greece) GRE | Spyros Papathanasiou | 0 | 0 | 0+0 | 0 | 0+0 | 0 |
| 14 | MF | (Greece) GRE | Giannis Pasas | 32 | 3 | 16+10 | 2 | 6+0 | 1 |
| 15 | MF | (Canada) CAN | Emmanuel Zambazis | 0 | 0 | 0+0 | 0 | 0+0 | 0 |
| 16 | DF | (Greece) GRE | Dimitris Toskas | 8 | 1 | 2+2 | 0 | 3+1 | 1 |
| 17 | MF | (Greece) GRE | Miltos Stefanidis | 2 | 0 | 0+1 | 0 | 0+1 | 0 |
| 17 | MF | (Greece) GRE | Ilias Kalfountzos | 1 | 0 | 0+1 | 0 | 0+0 | 0 |
| 19 | MF | (Greece) GRE | Pavlos Kyriakidis | 33 | 4 | 19+7 | 2 | 7+0 | 2 |
| 21 | DF | (Greece) GRE | Giorgos Valerianos | 18 | 0 | 9+4 | 0 | 3+2 | 0 |
| 22 | DF | (Argentina) ARG | Sebastián Bartolini | 32 | 1 | 24+1 | 1 | 6+1 | 0 |
| 23 | MF | (Greece) GRE | Paschalis Kassos | 28 | 4 | 12+9 | 4 | 4+3 | 0 |
| 25 | FW | (Greece) GRE | Giannis Loukinas | 35 | 15 | 18+11 | 15 | 1+5 | 0 |
| 26 | DF | (Greece) GRE | Asterios Mouchalis | 0 | 0 | 0+0 | 0 | 0+0 | 0 |
| 30 | GK | (Greece) GRE | Panagiotis Ladas | 1 | 0 | 0+0 | 0 | 1+0 | 0 |
| 33 | DF | (Greece) GRE | Nikos Ziabaris | 39 | 1 | 27+3 | 1 | 8+1 | 0 |
| 40 | GK | (Greece) GRE | Serafeim Giannikoglou | 3 | 0 | 2+0 | 0 | 1+0 | 0 |
| 44 | DF | (Greece) GRE | Konstantinos Rougalas | 6 | 0 | 3+3 | 0 | 0+0 | 0 |
| 70 | MF | (Greece) GRE | Ilias Tsiliggiris | 14 | 1 | 4+8 | 1 | 0+2 | 0 |
| 77 | DF | (Greece) GRE | Giannis Tsotras | 1 | 0 | 0+1 | 0 | 0+0 | 0 |
| 91 | FW | (Greece) GRE | Nikos Aggeloudis | 12 | 0 | 1+6 | 0 | 2+3 | 0 |
Players who left the club in-season
| 6 | MF | (Ivory Coast) CIV | Hassoma Bino Bamba | 0 | 0 | 0+0 | 0 | 0+0 | 0 |
| 20 | DF | (Greece) GRE | Giorgos Smiltos | 3 | 0 | 0+2 | 0 | 1+0 | 0 |

Last updated: 10 June 2015
Source: Match reports in Competitive matches

=== Top scorers ===
As of 10 June 2015

Includes all competitive matches. The list is sorted by shirt number when total goals are equal.

| R | No. | Pos | Nat | Name | Football League | Greek Cup | Total |
|---|---|---|---|---|---|---|---|
| 1 | 25 | FW | (Greece) | Giannis Loukinas | 15 | 0 | 15 |
| 2 | 9 | FW | (Argentina) | Emanuel Perrone | 5 | 1 | 6 |
| 3 | 11 | MF | (Greece) | Nikos Pourtoulidis | 5 | 0 | 5 |
| 4 | 10 | MF | (Argentina) | Diego Romano | 2 | 2 | 4 |
| = | 19 | MF | (Greece) | Pavlos Kyriakidis | 2 | 2 | 4 |
| = | 23 | MF | (Greece) | Paschalis Kassos | 4 | 0 | 4 |
| 7 | 7 | MF | (Greece) | Kosmas Tsilianidis | 3 | 0 | 3 |
| = | 12 | MF | (Greece) | Savvas Siatravanis | 2 | 1 | 3 |
| = | 14 | MF | (Greece) | Giannis Pasas | 2 | 1 | 3 |
| 10 | 4 | DF | (Greece) | Aristotelis Karassalidis | 1 | 0 | 1 |
| = | 16 | DF | (Greece) | Dimitris Toskas | 0 | 1 | 1 |
| = | 22 | DF | (Argentina) | Sebastián Bartolini | 1 | 0 | 1 |
| = | 33 | DF | (Greece) | Nikos Ziabaris | 1 | 0 | 1 |
| = | 70 | MF | (Greece) | Ilias Tsiliggiris | 1 | 0 | 1 |
| | | | | Own Goals | 0 | 1 | 1 |
| | | | | TOTAL | 44 | 9 | 53 |

=== Top assists ===
As of 10 June 2015

Includes all competitive matches. The list is sorted by shirt number when total assists are equal.

| R | No. | Pos | Nat | Name | Football League | Greek Cup | Total |
|---|---|---|---|---|---|---|---|
| 1 | 9 | FW | (Argentina) | Emanuel Perrone | 4 | 2 | 6 |
| 2 | 7 | FW | (Greece) | Kosmas Tsilianidis | 5 | 0 | 5 |
| = | 10 | MF | (Argentina) | Diego Romano | 5 | 0 | 5 |
| 4 | 8 | MF | (Greece) | Lefteris Intzoglou | 3 | 0 | 3 |
| = | 11 | MF | (Greece) | Nikos Pourtoulidis | 2 | 1 | 3 |
| = | 14 | FW | (Greece) | Giannis Pasas | 3 | 0 | 3 |
| = | 19 | MF | (Greece) | Pavlos Kyriakidis | 2 | 1 | 3 |
| 8 | 23 | MF | (Greece) | Paschalis Kassos | 1 | 1 | 2 |
| 9 | 3 | DF | (Greece) | Giorgos Saramantas | 1 | 0 | 1 |
| = | 12 | MF | (Greece) | Savvas Siatravanis | 1 | 0 | 1 |
| = | 44 | DF | (Greece) | Konstantinos Rougalas | 1 | 0 | 1 |
| = | 91 | FW | (Greece) | Nikos Aggeloudis | 0 | 1 | 1 |
| | | | | TOTAL | 28 | 6 | 34 |

=== Disciplinary record ===
As of 5 January 2015

Includes all competitive matches. The list is sorted by shirt number when total cards are equal.

| R | No. | Pos | Nat | Name | Football League | | | Greek Cup | | | Total | | |
| R | No. | Pos | Nat | Name | Yellow card | (yellow card) (yellow-red card) | Red card | Yellow card | (yellow card) (yellow-red card) | Red card | Yellow card | (yellow card) (yellow-red card) | Red card |
| 1 | 10 | MF | (Argentina) | Diego Romano | 2 | 0 | 0 | 0 | 1 | 0 | 2 | 1 | 0 |
| 2 | 22 | DF | (Argentina) | Sebastián Bartolini | 1 | 0 | 0 | 0 | 1 | 0 | 1 | 1 | 0 |
| 3 | 9 | FW | (Argentina) | Emanuel Perrone | 4 | 0 | 0 | 1 | 0 | 0 | 5 | 0 | 0 |
| 4 | 2 | DF | (Greece) | Michalis Boukouvalas | 3 | 0 | 0 | 0 | 0 | 0 | 3 | 0 | 0 |
| = | 3 | DF | (Greece) | Giorgos Saramantas | 3 | 0 | 0 | 0 | 0 | 0 | 3 | 0 | 0 |
| = | 5 | DF | (Greece) | Dimitris Stamou | 3 | 0 | 0 | 0 | 0 | 0 | 3 | 0 | 0 |
| = | 8 | MF | (Greece) | Lefteris Intzoglou | 2 | 0 | 0 | 1 | 0 | 0 | 3 | 0 | 0 |
| = | 11 | MF | (Greece) | Nikos Pourtoulidis | 3 | 0 | 0 | 0 | 0 | 0 | 3 | 0 | 0 |
| = | 14 | FW | (Greece) | Giannis Pasas | 2 | 0 | 0 | 1 | 0 | 0 | 3 | 0 | 0 |
| = | 16 | DF | (Greece) | Dimitris Toskas | 1 | 0 | 0 | 2 | 0 | 0 | 3 | 0 | 0 |
| 11 | 12 | FW | (Greece) | Savvas Siatravanis | 1 | 0 | 0 | 1 | 0 | 0 | 2 | 0 | 0 |
| 12 | 1 | GK | (Brazil) | Huanderson | 0 | 0 | 0 | 1 | 0 | 0 | 1 | 0 | 0 |
| = | 13 | GK | (Greece) | Panagiotis Ladas | 0 | 0 | 0 | 1 | 0 | 0 | 1 | 0 | 0 |
| = | 21 | DF | (Greece) | Giorgos Valerianos | 0 | 0 | 0 | 1 | 0 | 0 | 1 | 0 | 0 |
| = | 7 | FW | (Greece) | Kosmas Tsilianidis | 1 | 0 | 0 | 0 | 0 | 0 | 1 | 0 | 0 |
| = | 91 | FW | (Greece) | Nikos Aggeloudis | 1 | 0 | 0 | 0 | 0 | 0 | 1 | 0 | 0 |
| | | | | TOTAL | 27 | 0 | 0 | 9 | 2 | 0 | 36 | 2 | 0 |

== See also ==
- Iraklis F.C. (Thessaloniki)
- List of Iraklis Thessaloniki F.C. players
- List of Iraklis F.C. seasons
- G.S. Iraklis Thessaloniki
- G.S. Iraklis Thessaloniki (men's basketball)
- Iraklis B.C. in international competitions
- G.S. Iraklis Thessaloniki (women's basketball)
- Ivanofeio Sports Arena
- G.S. Iraklis Thessaloniki (men's volleyball)
- G.S. Iraklis Thessaloniki (women's volleyball)
- G.S. Iraklis Thessaloniki (water polo)
- G.S. Iraklis Thessaloniki (rugby)
