= 2015–16 Iraklis F.C. season =

G.S. Iraklis Thessalonikis 2015–16 association football season

Iraklis
2015–16 season
- President: Spyros Papathanasakis
- Manager: Nikos Papadopoulos
- Stadium: Kaftanzoglio Stadium
- Super League Greece: 9th
- Greek Football Cup: Third Round
- Top goalscorer: League: Apostolos Vellios (9); All: Apostolos Vellios (9)
- Highest home attendance: 18.043 vs PAOK (18 October 2015)
- Lowest home attendance: 1.713 vs Skoda Xanthi (26 September 2015)
- Average home league attendance: 4.321
Home colours	Away colours	Third colours

The 2015–2016 season was Iraklis first season in the Super League since 2011 and 52nd in total.

== Players ==
The following list contains Iraklis' squad, as it was after the conclusion of the summer transfer window.

=== First team ===
No.	Name	Nationality	Position	Date of birth (age)	Signed from	Signed in	Apps.	Goals
Goalkeepers
1	Huanderson	(Brazil)	GK	3 August 1983 (aged 31)	Rio Ave	2012	91	0
30	Dušan Perniš	(Slovakia)	GK	28 November 1984 (aged 30)	Slovan Bratislava	2015	0	0
40	Makis Giannikoglou	(Greece)	GK	25 March 1993 (aged 22)	Fokikos	2015	2	0
–	Panagiotis Ladas	(Greece)	GK	26 August 1994 (aged 20)	Asteras Tripolis	2014	0	0
–	Spyros Papathanasiou	(Greece)	GK	12 February 1992 (aged 23)	Ethnikos Gazoros	2014	0	0
Defenders
2	Michalis Boukouvalas	(Greece)	RB	14 January 1988 (aged 27)	Kerkyra	2013	64	1
3	Giorgos Saramantas	(Greece)	LB	29 January 1992 (aged 23)	Paniliakos	2014	25	0
4	Aristotelis Karasalidis	(Greece)	CB	3 May 1991 (aged 24)	Niki Volos	2015	12	1
22	Sebastián Bartolini	(Argentina) (Italy)	CB	1 February 1982 (aged 33)	Asteras Tripolis	2014	25	1
23	Carlitos	(Cape Verde) (Portugal)	LB/RB	23 April 1985 (aged 30)	AEL Limassol	2015	0	0
26	Asterios Mouchalis	(Greece)	RB	4 February 1997 (aged 18)	Youth system	2014	0	0
33	Nikos Ziabaris	(Greece)	CB	18 February 1991 (aged 24)	Fostiras	2014	30	1
Midfielders
5	Dimitris Stamou	(Greece)	DM/CB	27 April 1991 (aged 24)	PAOK (Note: Originally from Iraklis' youth system)	2014	17	0
6	Paschalis Kassos	(Greece)	RW	7 November 1991 (aged 23)	Doxa Drama	2014	21	4
8	Lefteris Intzoglou	(Greece)	AM	3 March 1987 (aged 28)	Doxa Drama	2013	61	1
10	Diego Romano	(Argentina)	CM	11 March 1980 (aged 35)	Ergotelis	2014	27	2
11	Nikos Pourtoulidis (Captain)	(Greece)	DM	7 October 1983 (aged 31)	Niki Volos	2013	68	12
14	Giannis Pasas	(Greece)	LM	7 October 1990 (aged 24)	Panetolikos	2014	26	2
15	Costin Lazăr	(Romania)	DM	24 April 1981 (aged 34)	Panetolikos	2015	0	0
19	Pavlos Kyriakidis	(Greece)	AM	3 September 1991 (aged 23)	Zakynthos	2014	26	2
20	Emmanuel Zambazis	(Canada) (Greece)	CM	24 April 1997 (aged 18)	Vaughan Soccer Club	2014	0	0
21	Angelos Chanti	(Jordan) (Greece)	AM	7 September 1989 (aged 25)	Ergotelis	2015	0	0
54	Georgios Makris	(Greece)	DM	15 November 1984 (aged 30)	OFI	2015	0	0
Forwards
7	Kosmas Tsilianidis	(Greece)	RW/LW	9 May 1994 (aged 21)	Youth system	2011	70	10
9	Emanuel Perrone	(Argentina) (Italy)	FW	14 June 1983 (aged 32)	AEL Kalloni	2014	22	5
25	Giannis Loukinas	(Greece)	FW	20 September 1991 (aged 23)	Chania	2014	29	15
39	Apostolos Vellios	(Greece)	FW	8 January 1992 (aged 23)	Lierse	2015	22	4
99	Kerem Bulut	(Australia) (Turkey)	FW	3 February 1992 (aged 23)	Western Sydney Wanderers	2015	0	0

== Transfers ==
=== In ===
==== Summer ====
Date	Player	From	Fee	Source
25 June 2015	(Romania) Costin Lazăr	(Greece) Panetolikos	Free	
26 June 2015	(Greece) Angelos Chanti	(Greece) Ergotelis	Free	
29 June 2015	(Australia) Kerem Bulut	(Australia) Western Sydney Wanderers	Free	
3 July 2015	(Cape Verde) Carlitos	(Cyprus) AEL Limassol	Free	
15 July 2015	(Greece) Apostolos Vellios	(Belgium) Lierse	Free	
18 July 2015	(Slovakia) Dušan Perniš	(Slovakia) Slovan Bratislava	Free	
24 July 2015	(Greece) Georgios Makris	(Greece) OFI	Free	

=== Out ===
==== Summer ====
Date	Player	To	Fee	Source
18 June 2015	(Greece) Dimitris Toskas	(Greece) Lamia	Free	
1 July 2015	(Greece) Konstantinos Rougalas	(Belgium) OH Leuven	Free	
2 July 2015	(Greece) Savvas Siatravanis	(Greece) Panachaiki	Free	
8 July 2015	(Greece) Giorgos Smiltos	(Greece) Kissamikos	Free	
10 July 2015	(Greece) Miltos Stefanidis		Free	
13 July 2015	(Greece) Anestis Karakostas	(Greece) Veria	Free	
3 August 2015	(Greece) Nikos Aggeloudis	(Greece) Panserraikos	Free	
12 August 2015	(Greece) Giorgos Valerianos	(Greece) Apollon Smyrnis	Free	

== Club ==
=== Coaching staff ===
Position	Staff
Head coach	(Greece) Nikos Papadopoulos
Assistant coach	(Greece) Nikos Amanatidis
General manager	
Technical director	
Physical trainer	
Goalkeeper trainer	(Greece) Fotios Gizelis
Doctor	(Greece) Manolis Papakostas
Physiotherapist	(Greece) Konstantinos Tsiolakidis
Care taker	(Greece) Georgios Siagas
Youth team manager	
Academy director	

Last updated: June 2015

=== Other information ===
Chairman	(Canada) Spiros Papathanasakis
Vice President	(Greece) Theodoros Papadopoulos
Team Director	(Greece)
Marketing Director	(Greece) Nikos Gramenos
Press Secretary	(Greece) Theodoros Papadopoulos
Security manager	(Greece) Makis Sarlis
Ground (capacity and dimensions)	Kaftanzoglio Stadium (28,028 / 68x105 m)
Training ground	Mikra Training Center

=== Kit ===
Supplier: Blue Line
Sponsor(s): OPAP

Home	Away	Third kit

Source: sport24.gr

== Pre-season and friendlies ==
During pre-season Iraklis trained in Karpenisi and arranged friendly matches versus PAS Giannina, Panetolikos and Levadiakos. Iraklis agreed to play a friendly match with Italian Serie A club Fiorentina. The match was agreed to be held at Stadio Mariotti in Montecatini Terme on 15 August.

23 July 2015	Iraklis	3–1	PAS Giannina	Karpenisi
17:00 EEST	Romano 6'; Lazăr 48'; Bulut 55'	Report	Ferfelis 15'

26 July 2015	Iraklis	1–1	Panetolikos	Karpenisi
16:00 EEST	Stamou 46'	Report	Makos 83'

31 July 2015	Iraklis	1–2	Levadiakos	Karpenisi
19:00 EEST	Loukinas 68'	Report	Milosavljev 70'; Mantzios 72' (pen.)

5 August 2015	Iraklis	0–1	Panthrakikos	Thessaloniki
20:00 EEST		Report	Hasomeris 45+1'	Stadium: Kaftanzoglio

8 August 2015	Skoda Xanthi	0–0	Iraklis	Xanthi
20:00 EEST		Report		Stadium: Skoda Xanthi Arena

9 August 2015	Doxa Drama	0–0	Iraklis	Drama
20:00 EEST		Report		Stadium: Doxa Dramas Stadium

15 August 2015	Fiorentina	2–1	Iraklis	Montecatini Terme
19:00 EEST	Kalinić 17'; Iličić 28'	Live TV:	Perrone 26'	Stadium: Stadio Mariotti

== Super League Greece ==
=== League table ===
Pos	Team	Pld	W	D	L	GF	GA	GD	Pts
10	Levadiakos	30	9	10	11	27	36	−9	37
11	Panetolikos	30	9	8	13	30	46	−16	35 (Note: Head-to-head points: Panetolikos 4, Iraklis 1.)
12	Iraklis	30	8	11	11	24	32	−8	35
13	Skoda Xanthi	30	6	15	9	27	32	−5	33
14	Veria	30	5	12	13	19	33	−14	27

Source: Super League Greece
Rules for classification: 1) Points; 2) Head-to-head points; 3) Head-to-head goal difference; 4) Goals scored; 5) Goals against; 6) Play-offs (neutral ground); 7) Draw.
(Note: Criteria 6 is only used if needed to decide champion, teams for relegation or teams for UEFA competitions).

==== Results summary ====
Overall								Home						Away					
Pld	W	D	L	GF	GA	GD	Pts	W	D	L	GF	GA	GD	W	D	L	GF	GA	GD
30	8	11	11	24	32	−8	35	4	7	4	13	11	+2	4	4	7	11	21	−10

Last updated: 2 January 2016.
Source: Competitive matches

==== Results by round ====
Round	1	2	3	4	5	6	7	8	9	10	11	12	13	14	15	16	17	18	19	20	21	22	23	24	25	26	27	28	29	30
Ground	A	H	H	A	H	A	H	A	H	A	A	H	A	H	A	H	A	A	H	A	H	A	H	A	H	H	A	H	A	H
Result	W	L	L	D	D	D	D	L	W	L	D	W	W	D	L	W	L	D	D	L	W	W	D	L	L	D	L	L	W	D
Position	6	10	13	12	12	12	12	14	12	13	13	11	9	9	9	9	9	8	10	10	8	8	8	10	11	12	13	13	12	12

A = Away; H = Home; W = Win; D = Draw; L = Loss

==== Matches ====
22 August 2015 1	AEL Kalloni	0–1	Iraklis	Mytilene
19:15 EEST	Marković (yellow card) 40'; Keita (yellow card) 47'	Live TV:	Perrone 7'; Lazăr (yellow card) 40'; Romano (yellow card) 68'	Stadium: Mytilene Municipal Stadium; Attendance: 1.151; Referee: Dimitrios Styliaras (Aetolia-Acarnania)

30 August 2015 2	Iraklis	0–1	Panionios	Thessaloniki
19:15 EEST	Intzoglou (yellow card) 26'; Tsilianidis (yellow card) 50'; Perrone (yellow card) 78'; Bartolini (yellow card) 90+2'	Live TV:	Bakasetas (yellow card) 18', (goal) 45+3'; Argyropoulos (yellow card) 59' (yellow-red card) 62'; Korbos (yellow card) 78'	Stadium: Kaftanzoglio Stadium; Attendance: 4.473; Referee: Evangelos Kiotzenis (Xanthi)

14 September 2015 3	Iraklis	0–1	Levadiakos	Thessaloniki
19:30 EEST	Stamou (yellow card) 19'; Lazăr (yellow card) 58'	Live TV:	Mantzios 51'; Navarro (yellow card) 53'; Tsintotas (yellow card) 90+7'	Stadium: Kaftanzoglio Stadium; Attendance: 3.556; Referee: Dimitrios Karantonis (Imathia)

22 September 2015 4	Platanias	0–0	Iraklis	Chania
18:15 EEST		Live TV:		Stadium: Perivolia Municipal Stadium; Attendance: 1.646; Referee: Marios Lampropoulos

26 September 2015 5	Iraklis	1–1	Skoda Xanthi	Thessaloniki
18:15 EEST	Vellios 71'	Live TV:	Lucero 62'	Stadium: Kaftanzoglio Stadium; Attendance: 1.713; Referee: Stavros Tritsonis

4 October 2015 6	PAS Giannina	2–2	Iraklis	Ioannina
18:15 EEST				Stadium: Zosimades Stadium; Attendance: 2.282

18 October 2015 7	Iraklis	3–3	PAOK	Thessaloniki
20:30 EEST				Stadium: Kaftanzoglio Stadium; Attendance: 10.043

24 October 2015 8	AEK Athens	5–1	Iraklis	Athens
19:30 EEST				Stadium: Olympic Stadium; Attendance: 6.171

2 November 2015 9	Iraklis	2–0	Atromitos	Thessaloniki
19:30 EET				Stadium: Kaftanzoglio Stadium; Attendance: 2.100

8 November 2015 10	Olympiacos	2–0	Iraklis	Piraeus
15:00 EET				Stadium: Georgios Karaiskakis Stadium; Attendance: 19.505

23 November 2015 11	Veria	0–0	Iraklis	Veria
19:30 EET				Stadium: Veria Stadium; Attendance: 1.385

28 November 2015 12	Iraklis	1–0	Panathinaikos	Thessaloniki
19:30 EET				Stadium: Kaftanzoglio Stadium; Attendance: 6.160

5 December 2015 13	Asteras Tripolis	1–2	Iraklis	Tripoli
15:00 EET				Stadium: Theodoros Kolokotronis Stadium

12 December 2015 14	Iraklis	0–0	Panthrakikos	Thessaloniki
15:00 EET				Stadium: Kaftanzoglio Stadium

20 December 2015 15	Panetolikos	2–0	Iraklis	Agrinio
17:15 EET				Stadium: Panetolikos Stadium

2 January 2016 16	Iraklis	3–0	AEL Kalloni	Thessaloniki
19:30 EET				Stadium: Kaftanzoglio Stadium

10 January 2016 17	Panionios	1–0	Iraklis	Athens
17:15 EET				Stadium: Nea Smyrni Stadium

16 January 2016 18	Levadiakos	1–1	Iraklis	Livadeia
19:30 EET				Stadium: Levadia Municipal Stadium

25 January 2016 19	Iraklis	0–0	Platanias	Thessaloniki
19:30 EET				Stadium: Kaftanzoglio Stadium

31 January 2016 20	Skoda Xanthi	2–0	Iraklis	Xanthi
17:15 EET				Stadium: Skoda Xanthi Arena

7 February 2016 21	Iraklis	1–0	PAS Giannina	Thessaloniki
15:00 EET				Stadium: Kaftanzoglio Stadium

14 February 2016 22	PAOK	0–1	Iraklis	Thessaloniki
19:30 EET				Stadium: Toumba Stadium

20 February 2016 23	Iraklis	1–1	AEK Athens	Thessaloniki
19:30 EET				Stadium: Kaftanzoglio Stadium

29 February 2016 24	Atromitos	1–0	Iraklis	Athens
19:30 EET				Stadium: Peristeri Stadium

5 March 2016 25	Iraklis	Postponed	Olympiacos	Thessaloniki
19:30 EET				Stadium: Kaftanzoglio Stadium

13 March 2016 26	Iraklis	1–1	Veria	Thessaloniki
17:15 EET				Stadium: Kaftanzoglio Stadium

19 March 2016 27	Panathinaikos	4–0	Iraklis	Athens
19:30 EET				Stadium: Leoforos Alexandras Stadium

3 April 2016 28	Iraklis	0–1	Asteras Tripolis	Thessaloniki
19:00 EEST				Stadium: Kaftanzoglio Stadium

6 April 2016 25	Iraklis	0–2	Olympiacos	Thessaloniki
19:30 EEST				Stadium: Kaftanzoglio Stadium

10 April 2016 29	Panthrakikos	0–3	Iraklis	Komotini
19:00 EEST				Stadium: Komotini Municipal Stadium

17 April 2016 30	Iraklis	0–0	Panetolikos	Thessaloniki
19:00 EEST				Stadium: Kaftanzoglio Stadium

== Greek Cup ==
=== Second Round (Group A) ===
Pos	Team	Pld	W	D	L	GF	GA	GD	Pts	Qualification
1	Iraklis	3	2	1	0	7	1	+6	7	Round of 16
2	PAS Giannina	3	1	2	0	3	2	+1	5	Round of 16
3	Acharnaikos	3	1	0	2	2	4	−2	3	
4	Anagennisi Karditsa	3	0	1	2	0	5	−5	1	

Source: epo.gr

29 October 2015 1	PAS Giannina	1–1	Iraklis	Ioannina
19:30 EET		Live TV: OTE Sport		Stadium: Zosimades Stadium

1 December 2015 2	Iraklis	4–0	Anagennisi Karditsa	Thessaloniki
19:30 EET		Live TV: OTE Sport		Stadium: Kaftanzoglio Stadium

15 December 2015 3	Acharnaikos	0–2	Iraklis	Acharnes, Athens
15:00 EET		Live TV: OTE Sport		Stadium: Acharnes Stadium

=== Third round ===
5 January 2016 First leg	Veria	0–1	Iraklis	Veria
19:30 EET		Live TV: OTE Sport		Stadium: Veria Stadium

13 January 2016 Second leg	Iraklis	1–0	Veria	Thessaloniki
15:00 EET		Live TV: OTE Sport		Stadium: Kaftanzoglio Stadium

== Statistics ==
=== Appearances and goals ===
No.	Pos	Nat	Player	Total		Super League		Greek Cup	
No.	Pos	Nat	Player	Apps	Goals	Apps	Goals	Apps	Goals
1	GK	(Brazil) BRA	Huanderson	11	0	10+0	0	1+0	0
2	DF	(Greece) GRE	Michalis Boukouvalas	16	0	14+0	0	2+0	0
3	DF	(Greece) GRE	Giorgos Saramantas	13	0	11+1	0	1+0	0
4	DF	(Greece) GRE	Aristotelis Karassalidis	9	1	7+0	0	2+0	1
5	MF	(Greece) GRE	Dimitris Stamou	11	0	8+1	0	1+1	0
6	MF	(Greece) GRE	Paschalis Kassos	3	0	0+2	0	1+0	0
7	MF	(Greece) GRE	Kosmas Tsilianidis	10	0	6+2	0	1+1	0
8	MF	(Greece) GRE	Lefteris Intzoglou	15	0	11+1	0	3+0	0
9	FW	(Argentina) ARG	Emanuel Perrone	11	4	6+3	1	1+1	3
10	MF	(Argentina) ARG	Diego Romano	13	2	8+3	2	2+0	0
11	MF	(Greece) GRE	Nikos Pourtoulidis	8	0	2+5	0	0+1	0
14	MF	(Greece) GRE	Giannis Pasas	15	1	11+2	0	1+1	1
15	MF	(Romania) ROU	Costin Lazăr	6	0	6+0	0	0+0	0
18	MF	(Greece) GRE	Ilias Kalfountzos	0	0	0+0	0	0+0	0
19	MF	(Greece) GRE	Pavlos Kyriakidis	16	1	11+2	1	2+1	0
20	MF	(Canada) CAN	Emmanuel Zambazis	6	0	1+2	0	2+1	0
21	MF	(Greece) GRE	Angelos Chanti	9	1	1+6	0	2+0	1
22	DF	(Argentina) ARG	Sebastián Bartolini	13	1	12+0	1	1+0	0
23	DF	(Cape Verde) CPV	Carlitos	7	0	4+1	0	2+0	0
25	FW	(Greece) GRE	Giannis Loukinas	7	1	1+4	0	2+0	1
26	DF	(Greece) GRE	Asterios Mouchalis	0	0	0+0	0	0+0	0
30	GK	(Slovakia) SVK	Dušan Perniš	7	0	5+0	0	2+0	0
33	DF	(Greece) GRE	Nikos Ziabaris	12	0	7+2	0	3+0	0
39	FW	(Greece) GRE	Apostolos Vellios	14	6	11+2	6	0+1	0
40	GK	(Greece) GRE	Serafeim Giannikoglou	0	0	0+0	0	0+0	0
44	DF	(Greece) GRE	Panagiotis Avramidis	0	0	0+0	0	0+0	0
54	MF	(Greece) GRE	Georgios Makris	8	1	7+1	1	0+0	0
77	DF	(Greece) GRE	Giannis Tsotras	2	0	0+1	0	0+1	0
88	MF	(Greece) GRE	Ilias Kotsiaridis	0	0	0+0	0	0+0	0
91	FW	(Greece) GRE	Vassilis Amarantidis	0	0	0+0	0	0+0	0
99	MF	(Australia) AUS	Kerem Bulut	9	1	5+3	1	1+0	0

Last updated: 29 December 2015
Source: Match reports in Competitive matches

=== Top scorers ===
As of 2 January 2016

Includes all competitive matches. The list is sorted by shirt number when total goals are equal.

R	No.	Pos	Nat	Name	Super League	Greek Cup	Total
1	39	FW	(Greece)	Apostolos Vellios	9	0	9
2	9	FW	(Argentina)	Emanuel Perrone	1	3	4
3	10	MF	(Argentina)	Diego Romano	2	0	2
4	4	DF	(Greece)	Aristotelis Karassalidis	0	1	1
=	14	MF	(Greece)	Giannis Pasas	0	1	1
=	19	MF	(Greece)	Pavlos Kyriakidis	1	0	1
=	21	MF	(Greece)	Angelos Chanti	0	1	1
=	22	DF	(Argentina)	Sebastián Bartolini	1	0	1
=	25	FW	(Greece)	Giannis Loukinas	0	1	1
=	54	MF	(Greece)	Georgios Makris	1	0	1
=	99	MF	(Australia)	Kerem Bulut	1	0	1
				TOTAL	16	7	23

=== Top assists ===
As of 2 January 2016

Includes all competitive matches. The list is sorted by shirt number when total assists are equal.

R	No.	Pos	Nat	Name	Super League	Greek Cup	Total
1	7	FW	(Greece)	Kosmas Tsilianidis	2	1	3
2	2	DF	(Greece)	Michalis Boukouvalas	1	1	2
=	14	MF	(Greece)	Giannis Pasas	2	0	2
4	8	MF	(Greece)	Lefteris Intzoglou	0	1	1
=	9	FW	(Argentina)	Emanuel Perrone	1	0	1
=	11	MF	(Greece)	Nikos Pourtoulidis	0	1	1
=	15	MF	(Romania)	Costin Lazăr	1	0	1
=	19	MF	(Greece)	Pavlos Kyriakidis	1	0	1
=	21	MF	(Greece)	Angelos Chanti	0	1	1
=	33	DF	(Greece)	Nikos Ziabaris	0	1	1
=	39	FW	(Greece)	Apostolos Vellios	1	0	1
=	99	MF	(Australia)	Kerem Bulut	1	0	1
				TOTAL	10	6	16

=== Disciplinary record ===
As of 20 September 2015

Includes all competitive matches. The list is sorted by shirt number when total cards are equal.

R	No.	Pos	Nat	Name	Super League			Greek Cup			Total		
R	No.	Pos	Nat	Name	Yellow card	(yellow card) (yellow-red card)	Red card	Yellow card	(yellow card) (yellow-red card)	Red card	Yellow card	(yellow card) (yellow-red card)	Red card
1	15	MF	(Romania)	Costin Lazăr	2	0	0	0	0	0	2	0	0
2	5	DF	(Greece)	Dimitris Stamou	1	0	0	0	0	0	1	0	0
=	7	FW	(Greece)	Kosmas Tsilianidis	1	0	0	0	0	0	1	0	0
=	8	MF	(Greece)	Lefteris Intzoglou	1	0	0	0	0	0	1	0	0
=	9	FW	(Argentina)	Emanuel Perrone	1	0	0	0	0	0	1	0	0
=	10	MF	(Argentina)	Diego Romano	1	0	0	0	0	0	1	0	0
=	22	DF	(Argentina)	Sebastián Bartolini	1	0	0	0	0	0	1	0	0
				TOTAL	8	0	0	0	0	0	8	0	0

== See also ==
- Iraklis F.C. (Thessaloniki)
- List of Iraklis Thessaloniki F.C. players
- List of Iraklis F.C. seasons
- G.S. Iraklis Thessaloniki
- G.S. Iraklis Thessaloniki (men's basketball)
- Iraklis B.C. in international competitions
- G.S. Iraklis Thessaloniki (women's basketball)
- Ivanofeio Sports Arena
- G.S. Iraklis Thessaloniki (men's volleyball)
- G.S. Iraklis Thessaloniki (women's volleyball)
- G.S. Iraklis Thessaloniki (water polo)
- G.S. Iraklis Thessaloniki (rugby)
