= Aristotelis Karasalidis =

Greek footballer (born in 1991)

Telis Karasalidis
Personal information
- Full name: Aristotelis Karasalidis
- Date of birth: 3 May 1991 (age 35)
- Place of birth: Thessaloniki, Greece
- Height: 1.85 m (6 ft 1 in)
- Position: Centre-back

Team information
- Current team: Panserraikos
- Number: 4

Youth career
- 2006–2008: PAOK

Senior career*
Years	Team	Apps	(Gls)
2008–2011	PAOK	0	(0)
2010	→ Anagennisi Giannitsa (loan)	10	(0)
2011	→ Megas Alexandros Irakleia (loan)	9	(0)
2011–2013	Panserraikos	28	(2)
2013–2014	Aris	2	(0)
2014	Paniliakos	6	(0)
2014–2015	Niki Volos	10	(0)
2015–2016	Iraklis	31	(1)
2016–2017	Xanthi	20	(0)
2017–2019	Atromitos	43	(1)
2019–2020	Xanthi	32	(0)
2020–2021	Panetolikos	15	(0)
2022–2023	Panserraikos	38	(2)
2024	Kalamata	18	(0)
2024–	Panserraikos	23	(0)

International career
2008–2009	Greece U19	2	(0)
- * Club domestic league appearances and goals as of 7 September 2026

Aristotelis Karasalidis (Greek: Αριστοτέλης Καρασαλίδης; born 3 May 1991) is a Greek professional footballer who plays as a centre-back for Super League 2 club Panserraikos.

== Career ==
Karasalidis started his career το the youth teams of PAOK in 2008 also participating in Greece's U19 national team. He was signed a three-year contract with the senior team in 2010 but was later released before signing for Panserraikos in 2011.

== Career statistics ==
As of 29 October 2023

Club	Season	League			Cup		Continental		Other		Total	
Club	Season	Division	Apps	Goals	Apps	Goals	Apps	Goals	Apps	Goals	Apps	Goals
Panserraikos	2011–12	Super League Greece 2	5	2	—		—		—		5	2
Panserraikos	2012–13	Super League Greece 2	23	0	4	0	—		—		27	0
Panserraikos	Total		28	2	4	0	—		—		32	2
Aris	2013–14	Super League Greece	2	0	0	0	—		—		2	0
Paniliakos	2013–14	Super League Greece 2	6	0	—		—		—		6	0
Niki Volos	2014–15	Super League Greece	10	0	1	0	—		—		11	0
Iraklis	2014–15	Super League Greece 2	12	1	2	0	—		—		14	1
Iraklis	2015–16	Super League Greece	19	0	5	1	—		—		24	1
Iraklis	Total		31	1	7	1	—		—		38	2
Xanthi	2016–17	Super League Greece	20	0	2	0	—		—		22	0
Atromitos	2017–18	Super League Greece	24	1	7	1	—		—		31	2
Atromitos	2018–19	Super League Greece	19	0	7	1	0	0	—		26	1
Atromitos	Total		43	1	14	2	0	0	—		57	3
Xanthi	2019–20	Super League Greece	32	0	1	0	—		—		33	0
Panetolikos	2020–21	Super League Greece	15	0	0	0	—		—		15	0
Panserraikos	2021–22	Super League Greece 2	17	0	0	0	—		—		17	0
Panserraikos	2022–23	Super League Greece 2	21	2	3	0	—		—		24	2
Panserraikos	Total		38	2	3	0	—		—		41	2
Career total			225	6	32	3	0	0	0	0	257	9

== Personal life ==
Karasalidis hails from Kato Poroia, Serres.
