= Huanderson =

Brazilian footballer (born 1983)

Personal information
- Full name: Huanderson Junior da Silva Santos
- Date of birth: 3 August 1983 (age 43)
- Place of birth: Goiânia, Brazil
- Height: 1.87 m (6 ft 1 1/2 in)
- Position: Goalkeeper

Team information
- Current team: Karaiskakis
- Number: 77

Senior career*
Years	Team	Apps	(Gls)
2002–2004	Iraty		
2005–2006	São Bernardo		
2006–2007	XV de Jaú		
2007–2008	Roma Apuracana		
2008	Atlético Goianiense		
2009–2010	Francana		
2010–2011	Araguaína	13	(0)
2011	Goianésia	18	(0)
2011–2012	Rio Ave	23	(0)
2012–2017	Iraklis	134	(0)
2017–2020	Apollon Smyrnis	44	(0)
2020–	Karaiskakis	15	(0)
- * Club domestic league appearances and goals as of 18 May 2021

Huanderson Junior da Silva Santos (born 3 August 1983), commonly known as Huanderson, is a Brazilian professional footballer who plays as a goalkeeper for Greek Super League 2 club Karaiskakis.

Huanderson played for several clubs in his home country, before moving to Europe for Rio Ave.

== Career ==
=== Brazil ===
Huanderson started his career for Iraty in 2004. He moved clubs almost annually playing for São Bernardo, XV de Jaú, Roma Apuracana, Atlético Goianiense, Francana, Araguaína and Goianésia.

=== Europe ===
On 8 June 2011 Huanderson signed for Portuguese club Rio Ave. After being benched for the first matches of the season he finally made his debut in a Day 5 match against Leiria. On 25 September 2012 Huanderson signed for Greek Football League outfit Iraklis. He made his debut for the club on 12 November 2012 in a match against Apollon Smynis. After a string of good performances he signed a contract extension with Iraklis until 30 June 2016. After five years in Iraklis, on 5 September 2017, Apollon Smyrnis officially announced the signing of experienced Brazilian goalkeeper, until the summer of 2018.

== Career statistics ==
=== Club ===
As of 1 June 2019

Club	Season	League			Cup		Continental		Other		Total	
Club	Season	Division	Apps	Goals	Apps	Goals	Apps	Goals	Apps	Goals	Apps	Goals
Paços Ferreira	2011–12	Primeira Liga	23	0	1	0	—		0	0	24	0
Iraklis	2012–13	Football League	39	0	0	0	—		—		39	0
Iraklis	2013–14	Football League	20	0	2	0	—		—		22	0
Iraklis	2014–15	Football League	32	0	9	0	—		—		41	0
Iraklis	2015–16	Super League Greece	17	0	5	0	—		—		22	0
Iraklis	2016–17	Super League Greece	26	0	0	0	—		—		26	0
Iraklis	Total		134	0	16	0	—		—		150	0
Apollon Smyrnis	2017–18	Super League Greece	8	0	2	0	—		—		10	0
Apollon Smyrnis	2018–19	Super League Greece	24	0	0	0	—		—		24	0
Apollon Smyrnis	Total		32	0	2	0	—		—		34	0
Career total			189	0	19	0	0	0	0	0	208	0
