= Emanuel Perrone =

Argentine footballer

Personal information
- Full name: Emanuel Perrone
- Date of birth: 14 June 1983 (age 43)
- Place of birth: Río Cuarto, Argentina
- Height: 1.89 m (6 ft 2 in)
- Position: Striker

Youth career
- –2004: Talleres

Senior career*
Years	Team	Apps	(Gls)
2002–2004	Talleres	21	(3)
2004–2005	Troyes	22	(6)
2005–2006	Ionikos	26	(5)
2006–2008	Apollon Kalamarias	30	(8)
2008–2011	Atromitos	65	(23)
2011	Anorthosis	9	(1)
2011–2013	Asteras Tripolis	43	(16)
2013–2014	AEL Kalloni	22	(3)
2014–2017	Iraklis	62	(11)
2017–2018	AEL	25	(1)
2018–2019	Iraklis	31	(22)
Total		356	(99)
- * Club domestic league appearances and goals as of 1 January 2020

Emanuel Perrone (born 14 June 1983) is an Argentine former professional footballer who played as a striker.

== Career ==
Perrone started his career at Talleres in the Primera División Argentina in 2002. In 2004, he moved to France to join Troyes; he was at the club for one season before moving to Ionikos in Greece.

In 2006, he moved to Apollon Kalamarias, where he joined former Talleres teammate Lucas Favalli. Later on, he was transferred to Anorthosis Famagusta FC and made his debut on 6 February 2011 in a league match against Enosis Neon Paralimniou.

On 3 August 2011 Perrone signed for Asteras Tripolis. While he played at Asteras, the team had done the best in their team's history, reaching 3rd place in Greece's most professional league of soccer/football. At the beginning of the 2013/14 season, he signed a one-year contract with AEL Kalloni.

On 16 July 2014 Perrone signed a two-year contract with Iraklis. He scored in his debut for the club, a cup match against Lamia. By scoring against Kalloni in 2015–16 season opener, he became the first foreign player to score with six different teams in Greece's top-tier league. On 16 October 2017, by scoring with the jersey of AEL against Panathinaikos, Perrone became the first foreign footballer to score with seven different teams in Greece, increasing his record since last year. He also has a second nationality, holding an Italian passport.

On 7 August 2018, Iraklis officially announced the return of Perrone. On 19 December 2019, Perrone retired from football after starting the current campaign with Iraklis in the lower leagues of Greek football.

== Career statistics ==
Appearances and goals by club, season and competition
Club	Season	League		Cup		Continental^{[A]}		Others^{[B]}		Total	
Club	Season	Apps	Goals	Apps	Goals	Apps	Goals	Apps	Goals	Apps	Goals
Troyes	2004–05	22	6	1	0	—		2	0	25	6
Ionikos	2005–06	26	5	2	0	—		—		28	5
Apollon Kalamarias	2006–07	16	4	2	0	—		—		18	4
Apollon Kalamarias	2007–08	14	4	1	1	—		0	0	15	5
Apollon Kalamarias	Total	30	8	3	1	0	0	0	0	33	9
Atromitos	2007–08	8	4	4	1	—		—		12	5
Atromitos	2008–09	15	7	2	3	—		—		17	10
Atromitos	2009–10	25	8	1	0	—		—		26	8
Atromitos	2010–11	17	4	2	2	—		—		19	6
Atromitos	Total	65	23	9	6	0	0	0	0	74	29
Anorthosis	2010–11	9	1	0	0	—		—		9	1
Asteras Tripolis	2011–12	22	6	2	0	0	0	—		24	6
Asteras Tripolis	2012–13	21	10	5	0	4	1	—		30	11
Asteras Tripolis	Total	43	16	7	0	4	1	0	0	54	17
AEL Kalloni	2013–14	22	3	2	1	0	0	—		24	4
Iraklis	2014–15	22	5	9	1	0	0	—		31	6
Iraklis	2015–16	17	2	2	3	0	0	—		19	5
Iraklis	2016–17	23	4	2	0	0	0	—		25	4
Iraklis	Total	62	11	13	4	0	0	0	0	75	15
AEL	2017–18	25	1	8	1	0	0	—		33	2
Iraklis	2018–19	21	9	2	0	0	0	—		23	9
Iraklis	2019–20	8	13	—		—		—		8	13
Iraklis	Total	29	22	2	0	0	0	0	0	31	22
Career total		324	96	47	13	4	1	2	0	386	120
