= Paschalis Kassos =

Greek footballer

Personal information
- Date of birth: 7 November 1991 (age 34)
- Place of birth: Drama, Greece
- Height: 1.80 m (5 ft 11 in)
- Position: Winger

Team information
- Current team: Zakynthos
- Number: 31

Youth career
- –2011: Doxa Volaka

Senior career*
Years	Team	Apps	(Gls)
2011–2014	Doxa Drama	46	(7)
2011–2012	→ Prosotsani (loan)	0	(0)
2014–2016	Iraklis	33	(4)
2016–2017	Apollon Smyrnis	21	(3)
2017–2018	Aris	22	(3)
2018–2019	AEL	0	(0)
2019–2021	Chania	47	(8)
2021–2024	Niki Volos	86	(12)
2024–2025	Levadiakos	21	(0)
2025–2026	Anagennisi Karditsa	23	(2)
2026–	Zakynthos	2	(1)
- * Club domestic league appearances and goals as of 19 September 2026

Paschalis Kassos (Greek: Πασχάλης Κάσσος, born 7 November 1991) is a Greek professional footballer who plays as a winger for Super League 2 club Zakynthos.

== Career ==
=== Doxa Drama ===
Kassos signed for Doxa Drama in 2011 and was loaned out to Prosotsani to get playing time. He debuted for Doxa Drama on 9 December 2012 in a home win against Ethnikos Gazoros. Kassos managed to score his first goal for the club on 15 May 2013 in a home draw against Fokikos. Totally in his two years with Doxa he appeared in 45 matches and scored 7 goals.

=== Iraklis ===
On 19 August 2014 Kassos signed for Football League club Iraklis.

=== Aris ===
On 27 July 2017 he joined Aris. On 28 October 2017 he scored his first goal for the club in a 5–0 home win against Aiginiakos. On 12 March he scored in a 3–0 home win against Ergotelis.

=== AEL ===
On 4 June 2018, he joined AEL on a three-year contract.
