= Fabinho (footballer, born 1984) =

Brazilian footballer

Personal information
- Full name: Fábio Augusto Machado
- Date of birth: 20 July 1984 (age 42)
- Place of birth: Florianópolis, Brazil
- Height: 1.76 m (5 ft 9 1/2 in)
- Position: Midfielder

Team information
- Current team: Asteras Itea

Senior career*
Years	Team	Apps	(Gls)
2003	Portuguesa		
2003	São Paulo		
2004	Corinthians		
2004	Figueirense	1	(0)
2005–2006	Avaí		
2006–2009	Ionikos	43	(2)
2009–2010	Ethnikos Asteras	21	(2)
2010–2011	Kallithea	24	(1)
2011	Diagoras	4	(1)
2012	Fluminense-BA	0	(0)
2012–2013	Pierikos	31	(1)
2013–2015	Aiginiakos	56	(1)
2015–2016	OFI	0	(0)
2016–2017	Ermis Zoniana	0	(0)
2017–2018	Panthiraikos	0	(0)
2018–	Proodeftiki	0	(0)
- * Club domestic league appearances and goals as of 21:28, 28 March 2018 (UTC)

Fábio Augusto Machado commonly known as Fabinho (born 20 July 1984) is a Brazilian footballer who plays for Asreas Itea.

Fabinho began his professional career with Associação Portuguesa Londrinense. He made one appearance with Figueirense Futebol Clube in the Campeonato Brasileiro.
