= Miltos Stefanidis =

Greek footballer

Personal information
- Full name: Μιλτιάδης Στεφανίδης
- Date of birth: 17 December 1995 (age 30)
- Position: Midfielder

Youth career
- –2012: Panserraikos
- 2012–2014: Iraklis

Senior career*
Years	Team	Apps	(Gls)
2014–2015	Iraklis	1	(0)
- * Club domestic league appearances and goals as of 13 June 2015

Miltiadis "Miltos" Stefanidis (Greek: Μιλτιάδης "Μίλτος" Στεφανίδης, Greek pronunciation: [milti'aðis 'miltos stefa'niðis] born 17 December 1995) is a Greek football midfielder. He has also played football in the youth ranks of Panserraikos.

== Career ==
=== Club career ===
Stefanidis started his football with Panserraikos. He subsequently moved to Iraklis, in 2012, where he started playing for the club's youth team. On 19 August 2014 he signed a professional contract with Iraklis. Stefanidis made his full professional debut for Iraklis in a Greek Cup match against Ethnikos Gazoros. He was released by Iraklis on 10 July 2015.
