= Georgios Saramantas =

Greek footballer (born 1992)

Personal information
- Date of birth: 29 January 1992 (age 34)
- Place of birth: Pyrgos, Greece
- Height: 1.70 m (5 ft 7 in)
- Position: Left back

Team information
- Current team: PAS Pyrgos
- Number: 3

Senior career*
Years	Team	Apps	(Gls)
2011–2012	Xenofon Krestena		
2012–2014	Paniliakos	37	(0)
2014–2017	Iraklis	75	(0)
2017–2020	Panionios	60	(0)
2020–2025	Lamia	68	(0)
2025–2026	Panionios	19	(0)
2026–	PAS Pyrgos	3	(0)
- * Club domestic league appearances and goals as of 21 September 2026

Georgios Saramantas (Greek: Γεώργιος Σαραμαντάς; born 29 January 1992) is a Greek professional footballer who plays as a left back for Super League 2 club PAS Pyrgos.

== Career ==
=== Paniliakos ===
Saramantas moved to Paniliakos in the summer of 2012 from Xenofon Krestena. He debuted for Paniliakos in a match against Kalamata. He stayed with his hometown club for two seasons appearing in 37 matches.

=== Iraklis ===
On 10 July 2014 Saramantas signed for Greek Football League club Iraklis. He debuted for Iraklis in a cup match against Lamia. His league debut came a couple of months later against Olympiacos Volos. After the expiry of his contract he left the club. During his three seasons with the club he made a total of 91 appearances.

=== Panionios ===
On 15 June 2017, Saramantas signed a three years' contract with Super League Greece club Panionios for an undisclosed fee.

=== Lamia ===
On 6 August 2020, Saramantas signed a one-year contract with Lamia.

== Career statistics ==
As of 29 January 2022

Club	Season	League			Greek Cup		Continental		Total	
Club	Season	Division	Apps	Goals	Apps	Goals	Apps	Goals	Apps	Goals
Paniliakos	2012–13	Football League Greece	20	0	1	0	—		21	0
Paniliakos	2013–14	Football League Greece	17	0	1	0	—		18	0
Paniliakos	Total		37	0	2	0	—		39	0
Iraklis	2014–15	Football League Greece	25	0	8	0	—		33	0
Iraklis	2015–16	Super League Greece	23	0	5	0	—		28	0
Iraklis	2016–17	Super League Greece	27	0	3	0	—		30	0
Iraklis	Total		75	0	16	0	—		91	0
Panionios	2017–18	Super League Greece	22	0	9	0	3 (Note: Appearances in UEFA Europa League)	0	34	0
Panionios	2018–19	Super League Greece	13	0	5	1	—		18	1
Panionios	2019–20	Super League Greece	25	0	4	0	—		29	0
Panionios	Total		60	0	18	1	3	0	81	1
Lamia	2020–21	Super League Greece	14	0	2	0	—		16	0
Lamia	2021–22	Super League Greece	11	0	3	0	—		14	0
Lamia	Total		25	0	5	0	—		30	0
Career total			197	0	41	1	3	0	241	1
