= Ilias Tsiligiris =

Greek footballer (born in 1987)

Personal information
- Date of birth: 3 October 1987 (age 39)
- Place of birth: Athens, Greece
- Height: 1.79 m (5 ft 10 in)
- Position: Winger

Team information
- Current team: Aris Petroupolis

Senior career*
Years	Team	Apps	(Gls)
2007–2009	Panerythraikos	59	(28)
2009–2010	Elpidoforos	18	(10)
2010–2011	Thrasyvoulos	8	(2)
2011–2014	Apollon Smyrnis	78	(7)
2014–2015	AEL	8	(0)
2015	Iraklis	12	(1)
2015–2016	Olympiacos Volos	9	(2)
2016	Aiolikos	0	(0)
2016–2017	Panegialios	29	(4)
2017–2018	Aittitos Spata	25	(5)
2018–2019	Ethnikos Piraeus	0	(0)
2019–2023	Egaleo	91	(14)
2023–	Aris Petroupolis		
- * Club domestic league appearances and goals as of 16 June 2023

Ilias Tsiligiris (Greek: Ηλίας Τσιλιγγίρης, born 3 October 1987) is a Greek professional footballer who plays as a winger for Gamma Ethniki club Aris Petroupolis.

== Career ==
On 16 July 2014, Tsiligiris signed for AEL, but he was released from the club on 23 December 2014. On 8 January 2015, he signed a 1.5 year contract with Greek Football League club Iraklis.
