= Nikos Ziabaris =

Greek footballer

Personal information
- Full name: Nikolaos Ziabaris
- Date of birth: 18 February 1991 (age 35)
- Place of birth: Serres, Greece
- Height: 1.94 m (6 ft 4 1/2 in)
- Position: Defender

Senior career*
Years	Team	Apps	(Gls)
2010–2011	Megas Alexandros Irakleia	20	(0)
2011–2013	Kerkyra	2	(1)
2013	Kavala	0	(0)
2013–2014	Fostiras	27	(1)
2014–2017	Iraklis	64	(3)
2017–2018	OFI	8	(0)
2018	Olympiakos Nicosia	12	(0)
2018–2019	Iraklis	22	(2)
2019–2021	Chania	0	(0)
2021–2022	Panserraikos		

Managerial career
- 2023: Agrotikos Asteras (technical director)
- * Club domestic league appearances and goals as of 5 May 2019

Nikos Ziabaris (Greek: Νίκος Ζιαμπάρης, born 18 February 1991) is a Greek former professional footballer who played as a defender and currently technical director.

== Club career ==
He started his professional career at Megas Alexandros Irakleia, from where he transferred to Kerkyra in the summer of 2011. During the 2012–13 season he was under contract with Kavala failing to make any appearances throughout the season. He played for Fostiras for the 2013–14 season appearing in 27 matches and scoring 1 goal. On 14 July 2014 he signed for Greek Football League club Iraklis. Ziabaris debuted for Iraklis in the opening game of the season against Pierikos. He scored his first goal for the club in a home win against Apollon Kalamarias.
