= Stefanos Polyzos =

Greek footballer

Personal information
- Date of birth: 16 August 1995 (age 31)
- Place of birth: Siatista, Greece
- Height: 1.81 m (5 ft 11 1/2 in)
- Position: Midfielder

Team information
- Current team: Kampaniakos
- Number: 22

Youth career
- –2014: PAOK

Senior career*
Years	Team	Apps	(Gls)
2014–2016	PAOK	0	(0)
2014–2015	→ Aiginiakos (loan)	21	(1)
2015–2016	→ Olympiacos Volos (loan)	3	(0)
2016	→ Aiginiakos (loan)	0	(0)
2016–2017	Doxa Drama	0	(0)
2017–2019	Aiginiakos	48	(2)
2019–	Veria	15	(0)
- * Club domestic league appearances and goals as of 18:39, 18 August 2020 (UTC)

Stefanos Polyzos (Greek: Στέφανος Πολύζος, born 16 August 1995) is a Greek professional footballer who plays as a midfielder for Super League 2 club Kampaniakos.
