= Augustin Billa =

Cameroonian footballer

Personal information
- Full name: Augustin Emmanuel Ntamack Billa
- Date of birth: 25 August 1990 (age 36)
- Place of birth: Yaoundé, Cameroon
- Height: 1.72 m (5 ft 8 in)
- Positions: Striker; winger

Youth career
- 2008–2009: Benfica

Senior career*
Years	Team	Apps	(Gls)
2009–2011	Rouen	0	(0)
2011–2012	Atlético Reguengos	15	(2)
2012–2014	SC Mirandela	47	(4)
2014–2015	AEL	8	(0)
2015	Tyrnavos	4	(0)
2017	Vevey Sports	9	(0)
2017–2020	Jeunesse Canach		
- * Club domestic league appearances and goals

Augustin Billa (born 25 August 1990) is a Cameroonian professional footballer who plays as a striker or winger.

== Career ==
Billa began his career from the youth teams of Benfica. In 2009, he tried his luck in France with Rouen. He returned to Portugal in 2011 and had three successful seasons with Atlético Reguengos and SC Mirandela. On 7 September 2014, he signed a one-year contract with AEL.

In 2017 Billa moved to Luxembourg Division of Honour club Jeunesse Canach.
