= Spyros Papathanasiou =

Greek footballer

Personal information
- Full name: Spyridon Papathanasiou
- Date of birth: 12 February 1992 (age 34)
- Place of birth: Thessaloniki, Greece
- Height: 1.91 m (6 ft 3 in)
- Position: Goalkeeper

Team information
- Current team: Thyella Sarakinoi
- Number: 1

Youth career
- –2010: PAOK

Senior career*
Years	Team	Apps	(Gls)
2009–2010	PAOK	0	(0)
2010	→ Visaltiakos	0	(0)
2010–2011	Kavala	0	(0)
2011–2014	Ethnikos Gazoros	12	(0)
2014–2015	Iraklis	0	(0)
2015–2016	Iraklis Ampelokipon	14	
2015-2016	Aiginiakos	0	
2016–2018	Makedonikos	34	
2018–2019	Iraklis Ampelokipon	22	
2019-2020	Agrotikos Asteras	25	

International career
–2008	Greece U17	8	(0)
- * Club domestic league appearances and goals as of 24 August 2014

Spyridon "Spyros" Papathanasiou (Greek: Σπυρίδων "Σπύρος" Παπαθανασίου; born 12 February 1992, in Thessaloniki) is a former Greek footballer as a goalkeeper. He has also played football for PAOK, Visaltiakos, Kavala and Ethnikos Gazoros and Iraklis. Papathanasiou has played international football with Greece U17.

== Club career ==
Papathanasiou started his football in the youth teams of PAOK. PAOK loaned him to Visaltiakos.

After leaving PAOK in 2010 he signed for Kavala.

In 2011, he moved to Ethnikos Gazoros. In his three seasons with the club he appeared in 11 matches. On 29 July 2014 he signed a two-year contract with Greek Football League club Iraklis.

== International career ==
Papathanasiou has gained 8 caps for Greece U17.
