= Lefteris Intzoglou =

Greek footballer

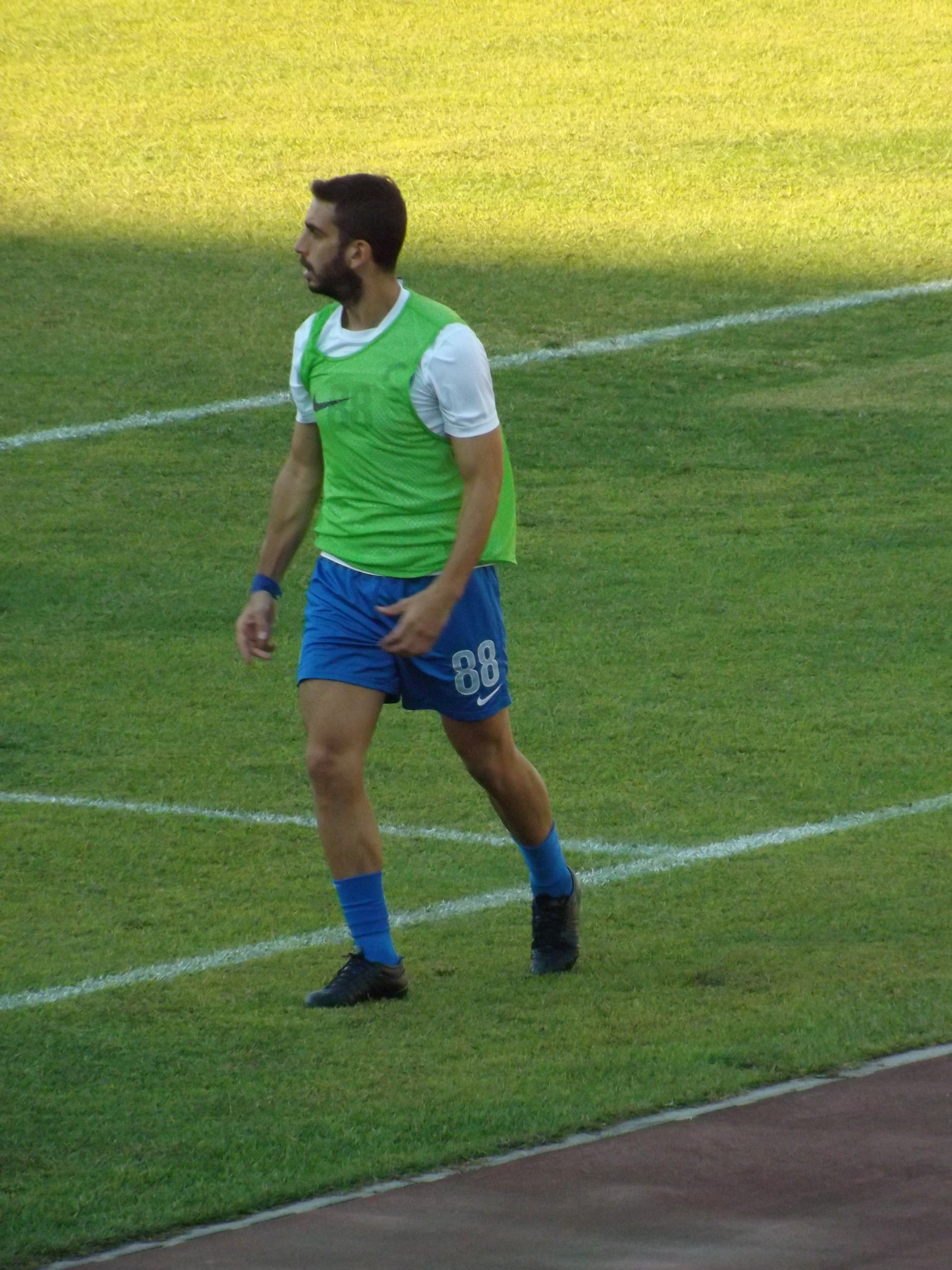

Personal information
- Full name: Eleftherios Intzoglou
- Date of birth: 3 March 1987 (age 39)
- Place of birth: Korydallos, Greece
- Height: 1.78 m (5 ft 10 in)
- Position: Defensive midfielder

Youth career
- Aetos Korydallos

Senior career*
Years	Team	Apps	(Gls)
2005–2010	Vyzas	125	(3)
2010–2011	AEK Athens	0	(0)
2011–2012	Atromitos	0	(0)
2011–2012	→ Pierikos (loan)	30	(1)
2012–2013	Doxa Drama	37	(2)
2013–2017	Iraklis	110	(1)
2017–2019	Aris	31	(0)
2019–2020	Panachaiki	15	(0)
- * Club domestic league appearances and goals as of 8 August 2020 ‡ National team caps and goals as of 30 May 2008

Lefteris Intzoglou (Greek: Λευτέρης Ιντζόγλου, born 3 March 1987) is a Greek professional footballer who plays as a defensive midfielder.

== Career ==
Intzoglou began playing professional football by signing with Vyzas in June 2005. He requested a transfer in June 2009, but did not leave the club until the end of the 2009–10 season. AEK Athens manager Dušan Bajević signed Intzoglou in June 2010. In July 2011 he signed for Atromitos and he was immediately loaned out to Pierikos. He debuted for Pierikos in a match against his former club Vyzas. He scored his sole goal for the club to help his team get a draw against AEL Kalloni. In the summer of 2012 he reached an agreement with Doxa Drama with which he spent the 2012-13 season. On 2 August 2013 Intzoglou signed a contract with Greek Football League outfit Iraklis. He made his debut for his new club in an away 3–2 loss against Kavala. He scored his first goal for Iraklis in 1–2 home defeat versus Niki Volos. On 18 July 2017, Intzoglou signed a two years' contract with rivals Aris for an undisclosed fee.

== Personal life ==
He is the son of the former international defender, Babis, who also played for AEK Athens and the nephew of the former international forward Thanasis.
