= Michalis Boukouvalas =

Greek former professional footballer

Personal information
- Full name: Michail Boukouvalas
- Date of birth: 14 January 1988 (age 38)
- Place of birth: Agrinio, Greece
- Height: 1.70 m (5 ft 7 in)
- Position: Right-back

Team information
- Current team: Niki Volos (assistant coach)

Senior career*
Years	Team	Apps	(Gls)
2004–2007	Panetolikos	26	(1)
2007–2010	AEL	43	(0)
2010–2011	Trikala	29	(1)
2011–2013	Kerkyra	20	(0)
2013–2016	Iraklis	91	(1)
2016–2020	PAS Giannina	86	(0)
2020–2023	Veria	62	(1)
2023	Trikala	?	(?)
2024	Makedonikos	4	(0)

International career^{‡}
2007	Greece U19	8	(0)
2008–2010	Greece U21	10	(0)

Managerial career
- 2025–2026: Kalamata (assistant coach)
- 2026: Panserraikos (assistant coach)
- 2026–: Niki Volos (assistant coach)
- * Club domestic league appearances and goals as of 4 December 2024 ‡ National team caps and goals as of 10 June 2016

Michalis Boukouvalas (Greek: Μιχάλης Μπουκουβάλας; born 14 January 1988) is a Greek former professional footballer who played as a right–back. He has also been capped for Greece at youth level.

== Club career ==
In 2007, Boukouvalas was transferred to Larissa, after playing with Panetolikos for three years. In August 2011 he signed for Kerkyra. On 23 July 2013 he signed a two-year contract with Iraklis. He made his debut for his new club in an away 3–2 loss against Kavala. On 14 June 2015, Boukouvalas penned a three-year contract with Iraklis.

On 3 August 2016, he signed a two-year contract with PAS Giannina. On 11 May 2018 he extended his contract with the club till the summer of 2020 for an undisclosed fee.

== International career ==
Boukouvalas is a former member of Greece U-19. He was a starter in all five games of the Greek team that reached the final during the 2007 UEFA European Under-19 Football Championship.

On 19 May 2016, was called up to the senior squad for the friendly matches against Australia on 4 and 7 June 2016.

== Honours ==
=== P.A.S. Giannina ===
- Super League 2: 2019–20
