= Georgios Smiltos =

Greek footballer (born in 1992)

Personal information
- Full name: Georgios Smiltos
- Date of birth: 7 October 1992 (age 34)
- Place of birth: Agrinio, Greece
- Height: 1.82 m (5 ft 11 1/2 in)
- Position: Midfielder

Team information
- Current team: Panachaiki
- Number: 4

Youth career
- 2010–2011: Panetolikos

Senior career*
| Years | Team | Apps | (Gls) |
| 2011–2014 | Panetolikos | 2 | (0) |
| 2012–2013 | → Tylikratis (loan) | 11 | (0) |
| 2014 | → Kissamikos (loan) | 10 | (0) |
| 2014–2015 | Iraklis | 2 | (0) |
| 2015 | → Kissamikos (loan) | 0 | (0) |
| 2015–2016 | Kissamikos | 12 | (0) |
| 2016 | Anagennisi Karditsa | 29 | (0) |
| 2017–2018 | Panegialios | 18 | (0) |
| 2018–2019 | Ethnikos Piraeus | 0 | (0) |
| 2019–2021 | Ierapetra | 38 | (0) |
| 2021– | Panachaiki | 4 | (0) |
- * Club domestic league appearances and goals as of 1 June 2022

Georgios Smiltos (Greek: Γεώργιος Σμίλτος; born 7 October 1992) is a Greek professional footballer who plays as a midfielder for Super League 2 club Panachaiki.

== Career ==
Smiltos began his career with the youth club of Panetolikos. He signed his first professional contract in September 2011, but didn't make any appearances. He went on loan to Tylikratis for the first half of the 2012–2013 season. He returned to Panetolikos in January 2013, and made his first-team debut on 21 April 2013, playing against Thrasyvoulos for the 2012-2013 Greek Football League. On 17 January 2014 it was announced that he joined Kissamikos F.C on a six-month loan.

In the summer of 2014, Smiltos joined Iraklis. Smiltos was released by Iraklis on 8 July 2015. Following his release, he returned to Kissamikos.
