= Magenta Sport =

Greek television service

- Country: Greece

Programming
- Language: Greek
- Picture format: 576i (SDTV); 1080i (HDTV); 2160p (UHD)

Ownership
- Owner: OTE
- Sister channels: Magenta Cinema; Magenta History; Magenta Series

History
- Launched: 2009
- Replaced: Conn-x TV Sport (2009–2011); OTE Sport (2011–2016); Cosmote Sport (2016-2026)

Links
- Website: www.magentatv.gr/sports

Magenta Sport is a sports pay television service in Greece and it is owned by OTE Group. It launched in 2009 as Conn-x TV Sports and is currently available on Magenta TV via IPTV and satellite. It consists of eleven channels, one of which in 4K resolution. Magenta Sport covers exclusively the home matches of 8 teams in Super League Greece (-2025). Magenta Sport is the official broadcaster of UEFA Champions League, UEFA Europa League & UEFA Conference League (-2027). Magenta Sport is the exclusive broadcasting partner of NBA in Greece. In addition to that, it covers live events from various Association football, Basketball, Volleyball, Handball, Tennis, American football, Motorsport & MMA tournaments.

== Channels ==
Magenta Sport operates sixteen multiplex channels:

- Magenta Sport Highlights HD
- Magenta Sport 1 League
- Magenta Sport 2 League
- Magenta Sport 3 League
- Magenta Sport 4 League
- Magenta Sport 1HD
- Magenta Sport 2HD
- Magenta Sport 3HD
- Magenta Sport 4HD
- Magenta Sport 5HD
- Magenta Sport 6HD
- Magenta Sport 7HD
- Magenta Sport 8HD
- Magenta Sport 9HD
- Magenta Sport 4K
- Magenta Sport Start

== Sports broadcasting rights ==
=== Football ===
- Super League Greece
  - Home matches of Olympiacos F.C.
  - Home matches of AEK Athens F.C.
  - Home matches of OFI Crete F.C.
  - Home matches of Panetolikos F.C.
  - Home matches of Volos F.C.
  - Home matches of A.E. Kifisia F.C.
- (Europe) UEFA Champions League (-2027)
- (Europe) UEFA Europa League (-2027)
- (Europe) UEFA Conference League (-2027)
- (Cyprus) Cypriot First Division
- (England) EFL Championship
- (England) EFL League One
- (England) EFL League Two
- (Italy) Serie A
- (Portugal) Primeira Liga
- (Scotland) Scottish Premiership
- (Scotland) Scottish League Cup
- (Spain) La Liga

=== Basketball ===
- (United States) NBA
- (Europe) Basketball Champions League
- FIBA Intercontinental Cup
- (Italy) Lega Basket Serie A
- (Spain) Liga ACB
- (Turkey) Basketbol Süper Ligi
- (United States) WNBA

=== Volleyball ===
- (Europe) CEV Champions League
- (Europe) CEV Cup
- (Europe) CEV Challenge Cup
- (Europe) CEV Women's Champions League
- (Europe) Women's CEV Cup
- (Europe) CEV Women's Challenge Cup

=== Tennis ===
- ATP Finals
- ATP Masters 1000
- ATP 500
- ATP 250
- Next Gen ATP Finals

=== Handball ===
- (Germany) Handball-Bundesliga
- (Germany) DHB-Pokal
- (Germany) DHB-Supercup

=== Motorsport ===
- MotoGP / Moto2 / Moto3
- WRC
- DTM
- ERC

=== Athletics ===
- World Athletics Continental Tour (Gold)
- World Athletics Indoor Tour

=== Mixed Martial Arts (MMA) ===
- (United States) UFC
- (Czech Republic) (Slovakia) Oktagon MMA

=== Non-Sport Shows ===
- GameR1 (Gaming Show) - Airs every Friday at 22:30 on Cosmote Sport 1HD
