= Pavlos Kyriakidis =

Greek footballer

Personal information
- Date of birth: 3 September 1991 (age 35)
- Place of birth: Kozani, Greece
- Height: 1.81 m (5 ft 11 1/2 in)
- Position: Right-back

Team information
- Current team: Marko
- Number: 19

Senior career*
| Years | Team | Apps | (Gls) |
| 2009–2010 | Megas Alexandros Irakleia | 0 | (0) |
| 2010–2011 | Kozani | 28 | (3) |
| 2011–2013 | Paniliakos | 29 | (4) |
| 2013–2014 | Zakynthos | 20 | (2) |
| 2014–2017 | Iraklis | 65 | (5) |
| 2017–2018 | Atromitos | 19 | (0) |
| 2018–2019 | OFI | 18 | (0) |
| 2019–2020 | Apollon Smyrnis | 4 | (0) |
| 2020–2021 | Ermis Aradippou | 33 | (0) |
| 2021–2024 | Niki Volos | 82 | (2) |
| 2024–2025 | Chania | 23 | (3) |
| 2025– | Marko | 17 | (1) |
- * Club domestic league appearances and goals as of 15 February 2026

Pavlos Kyriakidis (Greek: Παύλος Κυριακίδης, born 3 September 1991) is a Greek professional footballer who plays as a right-back for Super League 2 club Marko.

He has played football for Megas Alexandros Irakleia, Kozani, Paniliakos, Zakynthos and Iraklis.

== Career ==
Kyriakidis started his career at Megas Alexandros Irakleia. In July 2010 he transferred to Kozani. With Kozani he had 28 appearances and scored 3 goals in the league, and 3 appearances in the cup. In July 2011 he left Kozani for Paniliakos. In his first season with the club Kyriakidis appeared in 13 matches and scored 2 goals, before a torn cruciate ligament sidelined him in April. In his second season with Paniliakos he appeared in 16 matches and scored a further 2 goals.

On 30 August 2013 he signed for Zakynthos. He debuted for his new club in the season opener against Anagennisi Karditsa and scored his first goal against Pierikos. Totally he played in 20 matches and scored 2 goals for the club. On 22 July 2014 he signed for Greek Football League club Iraklis. His first appearance in Iraklis' shirt came in a pre-season friendly match against Kallithea.
