= Giannis Pasas =

Greek footballer

Personal information
- Full name: Ioannis Pasas
- Date of birth: 7 October 1990 (age 36)
- Place of birth: Papadates, Greece
- Height: 1.84 m (6 ft 0 in)
- Position: Forward

Team information
- Current team: Panserraikos
- Number: 19

Youth career
- 2007–2008: Panetolikos

Senior career*
Years	Team	Apps	(Gls)
2008–2014	Panetolikos	48	(6)
2009	→ Akarnanikos (loan)		
2014–2017	Iraklis	74	(3)
2017–2018	Aris	26	(5)
2018–2019	Iraklis	12	(1)
2019	Kerkyra	12	(2)
2019–2022	Veria	74	(43)
2022–2024	Kalamata	51	(14)
2024–2026	AEL	52	(29)
2026–	Panserraikos	3	(1)
- * Club domestic league appearances and goals as of 20 September 2026

Giannis Pasas (Greek: Γιάννης Πασάς; born 7 October 1990) is a Greek professional footballer who plays as a forward for Super League 2 club Panserraikos.

== Career ==
=== Panetolikos ===
Pasas started his football at Panetolikos in 2008. In 2009, he was loaned out to Akarnanikos. Until 2014 he appeared in 48 matches for Panaitolikos scoring in 6 occasions.

=== Iraklis ===
On 10 July 2014 he signed for Iraklis. He debuted for Iraklis in a cup match against Lamia. During his three seasons with the club he played in 89 games having 7 goals and 8 assists.

=== Aris ===
On 27 July 2017 Football League club Aris announced the signing of the ex-Iraklis player. On 28 October 2017 he scored his first goal in 2–1 home loss against Panionios for the cup. Only three days later he scored in the season's opener, a 5–0 home win against Aiginiakos. On 31 January 2018 he scored a 90th-minute winner in an away win against Veria. On 24 March 2018 he scored a winner in a 3–2 away win against Kissamikos, after an assist from Markos Dounis.

=== Return to Iraklis ===
On 8 August 2018, he returned to Iraklis on a two-year contract. On 2 December 2018, he scored in a 3–0 away win against Aittitos Spata.

== Honours ==
Individual

- Super League Greece Best Goal: 2025–26 (Matchday 3)
