= Dimitrios Toskas =

Greek footballer

Personal information
- Date of birth: 13 March 1991 (age 35)
- Place of birth: Katerini, Greece
- Height: 1.88 m (6 ft 2 in)
- Position: Centre-back

Team information
- Current team: Pierikos
- Number: 55

Senior career*
Years	Team	Apps	(Gls)
2008–2012	Pierikos	19	(0)
2012–2013	PAEEK	13	(0)
2013–2014	Panionios	14	(0)
2014–2015	Iraklis	8	(1)
2015–2016	Lamia	14	(0)
2016	Željezničar	1	(0)
2016–2017	Doxa Drama	0	(0)
2017–2018	Olympiacos Volos	0	(0)
2018–2019	Kavala	0	(0)
2019–2021	Anagennisi Deryneia		
2021	Othellos Athienou		
2022–	Pierikos	19	(1)
- * Club domestic league appearances and goals as of 27 April 2022

Dimitrios Toskas (Greek: Δημήτριος Τόσκας; born 13 March 1991) is a Greek professional footballer who plays as a centre-back for Pierikos.

== Career ==
Toskas started his professional career with Pierikos in 2008. In 2012, he moved to Cyprus to play for PAEEK. In January 2013 he signed for Greek Super League club Panionios. He debuted for his new club in an away defeat against Aris. He appeared in all but two matches of his new club in his first season. He had to undergo surgery in the summer of 2013, due to a torn fibular ligament. He only appeared in one match during the season and was eventually released from the club in the summer of 2014.

On 7 August 2014 he signed a two-year contract with Iraklis. Toskas debuted for Iraklis in a cup match against Lamia.
