= Dimitrios Stamou =

Greek footballer

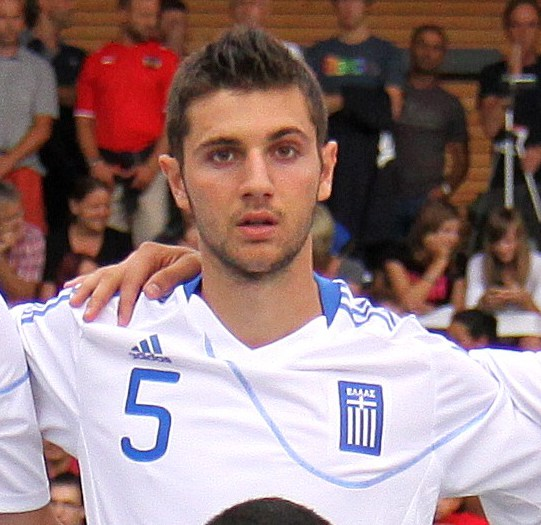

Personal information
- Full name: Dimitrios Stamou
- Date of birth: 27 April 1991 (age 35)
- Place of birth: Thessaloniki, Greece
- Height: 1.85 m (6 ft 1 in)
- Position: Centre-back

Team information
- Current team: Marko
- Number: 5

Youth career
- –2010: Iraklis

Senior career*
Years	Team	Apps	(Gls)
2010–2011	Iraklis	3	(0)
2011–2014	PAOK	0	(0)
2013	→ Kerkyra (loan)	7	(0)
2014–2017	Iraklis	45	(1)
2017–2018	Platanias	15	(0)
2018–2019	Iraklis	12	(0)
2019–2021	Veria	20	(0)
2021–2022	Olympiacos Volos	17	(1)
2022–2023	Ierapetra	22	(0)
2023–2025	AEL	38	(1)
2025–	Marko	15	(0)

International career^{‡}
2011	Greece U21	5	(0)
- * Club domestic league appearances and goals as of March 2026 (UTC) ‡ National team caps and goals as of 3 August 2014

Dimitrios Stamou (Greek: Δημήτριος Στάμου; born 27 April 1991) is a Greek professional footballer who plays as a centre-back for Super League 2 club Marko.

He started his career in Iraklis before moving to PAOK and Kerkyra. Stamou has been capped for Greece U21.

== Club career ==
=== Iraklis ===
Stamou is a product of the youth academies of Iraklis and signed his first professional contract for the club in the summer of 2010. He debuted in the Super League debut during a 0–0 home draw against Kerkyra. In the end, he managed to make 3 league appearances for the club.

=== PAOK ===
On 29 July 2011, Stamou signed a three-year contract with PAOK, after he was released from Iraklis. However, due to a series of injuries and subsequent operations, he failed to make his debut in the 2011–12 season. In January 2013 Stamou was loaned out to Kerkyra to get some playing time. He debuted for the club on 20 January 2013 in an away match against Skoda Xanthi. He totally appeared in 7 league matches for the club and in one cup match. Stamou returned to PAOK in the following summer. In July 2014 he was released by PAOK.

=== Return to Iraklis ===
On 29 July 2014 Stamou returned to Iraklis by signing a two-year contract.

=== Platanias ===
On 28 June 2017 Stamou signed a three-year contract with Platanias.

=== Third spell with iraklis ===
On 7 August 2018, he returned to Iraklis for the third time in his career.

== International career ==
Stamou is a Greece national under-21 football team international. He was called by Greece under-21 manager Georgios Georgiadis for the first time in June 2011 to appear in two friendly matches against Bulgaria under-21 and Poland under-21. He made his debut in an official UEFA under-21 match during a 2011 UEFA European Under-21 Football Championship qualification match against Belarus.

== Playing style ==
Stamou is 1.83 meters tall and is equally adept at playing as either a defensive midfielder or a centre back.
