= Panagiotis Korbos =

Greek footballer

Personal information
- Date of birth: 11 September 1985 (age 41)
- Place of birth: Athens, Greece
- Height: 1.82 m (5 ft 11 1/2 in)
- Position: Defensive midfielder

Senior career*
Years	Team	Apps	(Gls)
2003–2010	Atromitos	42	(1)
2007	→ Proodeftiki (loan)	15	(0)
2007–2008	→ Panegialios (loan)	29	(0)
2010	→ Olympiacos Volos (loan)	15	(0)
2010–2011	Trikala	26	(3)
2011–2013	Levadiakos	57	(4)
2013–2014	Apollon Smyrnis	30	(6)
2014–2015	Panetolikos	11	(0)
2015–2020	Panionios	167	(5)
2020–2021	Ionikos	17	(0)
- * Club domestic league appearances and goals as of 20:56, 21 September 2020 (UTC)

Panagiotis Korbos (Greek: Παναγιώτης Κόρμπος; born 11 September 1985) is a Greek former professional footballer who played as a defensive midfielder.

== Career ==
Born in Athens, Korbos began playing football for local side Chalkidona which was later (2005) absorbed by Atromitos. On 16 May 2004, he made his debut in Super League as a substitute in a 2–1 away loss against PAOK.
