= Nikos Angeloudis =

Greek footballer (born 1991)

Personal information
- Full name: Nikolaos Angeloudis
- Date of birth: 14 May 1991 (age 35)
- Place of birth: Thessaloniki, Greece
- Height: 1.83 m (6 ft 0 in)
- Position: Striker

Team information
- Current team: Irodotos
- Number: 32

Youth career
- 2003–2010: Iraklis

Senior career*
Years	Team	Apps	(Gls)
2009–2010	Iraklis	0	(0)
2009	→ Kozani (loan)	3	(0)
2010	→ PAONE (loan)	12	(3)
2010–2014	Aris	30	(5)
2012	→ Doxa Drama (loan)	5	(0)
2014–2015	Iraklis	7	(0)
2015–2016	Panserraikos	10	(1)
2016–2017	Panelefsiniakos	23	(3)
2017	Langadas	0	(0)
2018	Diagoras	0	(0)
2018–2019	Makedonikos	9	(0)
2019–	Irodotos	10	(2)
- * Club domestic league appearances and goals as of 25 June 2019

Nikos Angeloudis (Greek: Νίκος Αγγελούδης, born 14 May 1991) is a Greek professional footballer who plays as a forward for Irodotos. He has also played for Kozani, PAONE, Aris, Doxa Drama and Iraklis.

== Clubs ==
=== Early career ===
Angeloudis started his football at the youth ranks of Iraklis at the age of 12. He couldn't break through the club's first team and he was subsequently loaned to Kozani and PAONE.

=== Aris ===
He won the championship as a member of the youth team of Aris in 2010–2011 season. He was also the top scorer of the team with 14 goals. On 27 August 2011, he made his debut appearance with Aris in a match against PAS Giannina.

=== Doxa Drama ===
On 5 November 2011, he was loaned to newly promoted Super League side Doxa Drama.

=== Iraklis ===
On 23 August 2014 he signed for Greek Football League club Iraklis. He made his league debut for Iraklis in the season opening game against Pierikos. On 3 August 2015 his contract with Iraklis was terminated by mutual consent.

=== Panserraikos ===
In August 2015, Angeloudis signed with Panserraikos. He scored his first goal the winner against Olympiakos Volos.
