= Savvas Siatravanis =

Greek footballer (born in 1992)

Personal information
- Date of birth: 24 November 1992 (age 33)
- Place of birth: Larissa, Greece
- Height: 1.72 m (5 ft 8 in)
- Position: Winger

Team information
- Current team: PAS Giannina

Youth career
- –2008: Aris Larissa

Senior career*
Years	Team	Apps	(Gls)
2009–2013	AEL	21	(0)
2013–2015	Iraklis	70	(9)
2015–2016	Panachaiki	11	(3)
2016–2018	Apollon Smyrnis	41	(10)
2018–2019	Kerkyra	26	(5)
2019–2020	Panachaiki	16	(6)
2020–2021	Xanthi	26	(1)
2021	Niki Volos	0	(0)
2021–2022	Newcastle Jets	19	(2)
2022–2023	Apollon Larissa	9	(2)
2023	Makedonikos	12	(1)
2023–2024	Kozani	30	(1)
2024	Ethnikos Neo Keramidi	9	(0)
2025	AEL	7	(3)
2025–2026	Apollon Kalamarias	13	(1)
2026–	PAS Giannina	0	(0)
- * Club domestic league appearances and goals as of 17:00, 31 July 2026 (UTC)

Savvas Siatravanis (Greek: Σάββας Σιατραβάνης; born 24 November 1992) is a Greek professional footballer who plays as a winger for PAS Giannina.

== Career ==
=== AEL ===
Siatravanis signed for AEL in 2008. After one year playing with the team's U18 and U21 squads, he was promoted to the first team on 27 May 2009, having signed a five-year contract.

He made his debut in European competitions during a 2009–10 UEFA Europa League qualifier against KR Reykjavík from Iceland. He was the youngest Greek player to ever play in a European match, being 16 years 7 months and 22 days old.

=== Apollon Smyrnis ===
On 29 June 2016, Siatravanis signed for Football League club Apollon Smyrnis on a one-year contract. On 15 December 2016, he scored a hat-trick against Panathinaikos in the Greek Cup.The game ended in 4–3 loss and Apollon Smyrni was eliminated from the next round. In the 2016–17 season he recorded the best stats of his career with 13 goals and 5 assists in 31 appearances. His team gained promotion to the Super League, after winning the title. On 8 June 2017 the team's administration extended his contract for another year, acknowledging his contribution.

=== Kerkyra ===
On 25 August 2018, Kerkyra announced the signing of Siatravanis on a two-year deal. On 4 November 2018, he scored his first goal for the club in a 1–0 home win against his old club, Iraklis. On 25 November 2018, he opened the score in a 2–0 away win against Apollon Pontus. On 15 December 2018, he scored in a 1–1 home draw against Trikala.

=== Newcastle Jets ===
On 8 September 2021, Siatravanis signed with the Newcastle Jets for the 2021–22 season. He scored his first goal for the club on 16 April 2022, in a 2–1 loss to Melbourne Victory.

=== PAS Giannina ===
On 28 July 2026, Siatravanis was announced by PAS Giannina.
