= Sebastián Bartolini =

Argentine footballer

Personal information
- Full name: Sebastián Bartolini
- Date of birth: February 1, 1982 (age 44)
- Place of birth: Álvarez, Argentina
- Height: 1.90 m (6 ft 3 in)
- Position: Centre back

Senior career*
Years	Team	Apps	(Gls)
2003–2004	Newell's Old Boys		
2004–2005	Aurora	46	(14)
2005–2006	Belgrano	11	(1)
2006–2007	Godoy Cruz	16	(0)
2007–2008	CAI	49	(7)
2008–2009	Talleres de Córdoba	17	(1)
2009–2014	Asteras Tripolis	92	(5)
2014–2017	Iraklis	60	(3)
2017–2018	Apollon Smyrnis	31	(5)
- * Club domestic league appearances and goals as of 5 May 2018

Sebastián Bartolini (born February 1, 1982) is an Argentine footballer who plays as a centre back.

== Career ==
In July 2009, Bartolini signed for Greek Super League side Asteras Tripolis. In the summer of 2014, he was released from Asteras. On 4 August 2014 Bartolini signed for Greek Football League club, Iraklis. On 9 June 2017, the experienced Argentine central defender renewed his contract with Apollon Smyrnis until the end of 2017–18 season.
