= 2014–15 Football League (Greece) =

Football League
- Season: 2014–15
- Dates: 10 October 2014 – 14 June 2015
- Champions: AEK Athens
- Promoted: AEK Athens; Iraklis
- Relegated: Apollon Kalamarias; Serres; Fokikos; Tyrnavos; Aiginiakos; Pierikos; Alimos; Fostiras; Paniliakos; Enosi Ermionida; Episkopi; Iraklis Psachna
- Top goalscorer: Christos Aravidis (17 goals)

The 2014–15 Football League is the second division of the Greek professional football system and the fifth season under the name Football League after previously being known as Beta Ethniki. This is the second season since 1982–83, and the third season overall, that the league has more than one group. The groups are created based on geographical criteria.

== Notes ==
Doxa Drama and Aris withdrew from the league before the North Group draw. As a result of this the group left with only 12 teams and Fokikos moved from the South Group to the North Group.

== North Group ==
In the North Group, as well as in the South Group, the top three teams of each group will qualify for a playoff round, to determine which two teams will be promoted to the Super League. The bottom three teams of each group will be relegated. The teams in the 5th - 10th positions of each group will qualify for the relegation playoff round, to determine which six teams will also be relegated. For this season there will be 12 teams relegated in total (the bottom three teams from each group and the six teams from the relegation playoff), in order for the 2015-16 Football League to have only one group of 20 teams.

=== Teams ===
Location of teams in North Group of 2014–15 Football League

Team	Location	Stadium	Capacity	Last season
AEL	Larissa	AEL FC Arena	16,118	FL 2, Group 2, 1st
Agrotikos Asteras	Evosmos	Agrotikos Asteras Ground	2,267	FL 2, Group 1, 1st
Aiginiakos	Aiginio	Municipal Stadium of Aiginio	1,000	North Group, 3rd & Play-offs, 6th
Anagennisi Karditsa	Karditsa	Karditsa Stadium	9,500	North Group, 5th
Apollon Kalamaria	Kalamaria	Kalamaria Stadium	6,500	North Group, 7th
PAE Serres	Serres	Serres Municipal Stadium	9,500	North Group, 8th
Fokikos	Amfissa	Amfissa Municipal Stadium	2,000	South Group, 9th
Iraklis	Thessaloniki	Kaftanzoglio Stadium	27,770	North Group, 4th & Play-offs, 7th
Kallithea	Kallithea	Grigoris Lambrakis Stadium	4,250	South Group, 8th
Lamia	Lamia	Lamia Stadium	6,000	FL 2, Group 3, 1st
Olympiacos Volos	Volos	Volos Municipal Stadium	9,000	South Group, 1st & Play-offs, 3rd
Pierikos	Katerini	Katerini Municipal Stadium	4,956	North Group, 11th
Tyrnavos	Tyrnavos	Alcazar Stadium	13,108	North Group, 6th
Zakynthos	Zakynthos	Zakynthians Olympic Champions Ground	2,000	North Group, 9th

=== League table ===
Pos	Team	Pld	W	D	L	GF	GA	GD	Pts	Qualification or relegation
1	Iraklis (Q)	24	17	6	1	34	8	+26	57	Qualification to promotion play-offs
2	AEL (Q)	24	14	3	7	27	11	+16	45	Qualification to promotion play-offs
3	Olympiacos Volos (Q)	24	14	3	7	33	21	+12	45	Qualification to promotion play-offs
4	Lamia	24	12	7	5	24	17	+7	43	
5	Zakynthos (Q)	24	11	6	7	26	27	−1	39	Qualification to relegation play-offs
6	Anagennisi Karditsa (Q)	24	10	2	12	26	27	−1	32	Qualification to relegation play-offs
7	Aiginiakos (Q)	24	8	6	10	23	19	+4	30	Qualification to relegation play-offs
8	Pierikos (Q)	24	7	9	8	19	29	−10	30	Qualification to relegation play-offs
9	Agrotikos Asteras (Q)	24	8	5	11	23	27	−4	29	Qualification to relegation play-offs
10	Tyrnavos (Q)	24	7	8	9	16	24	−8	29	Qualification to relegation play-offs
11	Apollon Kalamarias (R)	24	7	5	12	19	23	−4	26	Relegation to Gamma Ethniki
12	Serres (R)	24	3	6	15	11	30	−19	15	Relegation to Gamma Ethniki
13	Fokikos (R)	24	2	6	16	12	30	−18	12	Relegation to Gamma Ethniki

Source: Football League
Rules for classification: 1) points, 2) head-to-head points
(Q) Qualified for the phase indicated; (R) Relegated

=== Matches ===
Home \ Away	AEL	AGR	EGN	KRD	APO	SFC	FOK	IRT	LAM	OVL	PIE	TYR	ZAK
AEL		1–0	2–0	2–0	2–0	4–0	1–0	0–1	0–0	0–1	2–0	0–0	2–0
Agrotikos Asteras	0–3		1–0	1–2	1–1	1–0	1–0	1–1	3–1	1–1	2–3	2–0	1–1
Aiginiakos	0–1	2–0		1–0	1–0	2–0	4–0	1–2	0–1	1–2	1–1	0–0	4–0
Anagennisi Karditsa	1–0	1–0	1–2		0–1	1–0	4–0	0–4	0–1	2–0	4–1	0–0	1–1
Apollon Kalamarias	0–1	0–2	0–1	1–0		1–1	0–0	0–1	1–0	0–1	0–0	1–0	5–0
Serres	2–1	0–2	0–0	0–3	1–0		1–1	0–1	0–1	1–2	3–0	0–1	0–0
Fokikos	0–1	2–0	0–0	1–2	1–2	0–0		0–1	1–1	1–1	0–2	4–1	1–2
Iraklis	0–1	1–0	2–1	2–0	3–0	0–0	1–0		0–0	1–0	2–2	3–0	2–0
Lamia	1–0	1–0	2–1	0–3^{1}	1–1	2–0	1–0	1–1		2–1	3–0	1–1	2–1
Olympiacos Volos	2–0	3–1	2–0	2–0	3–2	3–2	1–0	0–1	1–0		4–0	2–3	0–2
Pierikos	0–0	1–0	1–1	1–0	2–1	1–0	1–0	0–1	0–0	0–1		1–1	1–1
Tyrnavos	1–2	1–2	0–0	1–0	1–0	2–0	1–0	0–2	2–1	0–0	0–0		0–1
Zakynthos	2–1	1–1	1–0	5–1	0–2	1–0	1–0	1–1	0–1	1–0	2–1	2–0	

Legend: Blue = home team win; Yellow = draw; Red = away team win.
- ^{1} The match Lamia vs Anagennisi Karditsa 2–1, later awarded 0–3 w/o against Lamia for fielding a suspended player.

== South Group ==
The same rules from the North Group apply to the South Group.

=== Teams ===
Location of teams in South Group of 2014–15 Football League

Team	Location	Stadium	Capacity	Last season
AEK Athens	Maroussi	Olympic Stadium	69,618	FL 2, Group 6, 1st
Acharnaikos	Menidi	Acharnes Stadium	4,450	South Group, 7th
Alimos	Alimos	Agios Dimitrios Stadium	4,000	FL 2, Group 5, 1st
Apollon Smyrnis	Athens	Georgios Kamaras Stadium	14,856	SL, 17th
Chania	Chania	Perivolia Municipal Stadium	2,800	South Group, 2nd & Play-offs, 4th
Episkopi	Rethimno	DAK Gallos Stadium	1,300	South Group, 11th
Enosi Ermionida	Kranidi	Municipal Kranidi Stadium	800	FL 2, Group 4, 1st
Fostiras	Tavros	Tavros Stadium	4,000	South Group, 3rd & Play-offs, 8th
Iraklis Psachna	Psachna	Psachna Municipal Stadium	5,500	South Group, 4th & Play-offs, 5th
Kallithea	Kallithea	Grigoris Lambrakis Stadium	4,250	South Group, 8th
Panachaiki	Patras	Kostas Davourlis Stadium	11,321	South Group, 6th
Panegialios	Aigio	Aigio Stadium	4,500	South Group, 5th
~~Paniliakos~~	~~Pyrgos~~	~~Pirgos Municipal Stadium~~	~~6,750~~	~~South Group, 10th~~

=== League table ===
Pos	Team	Pld	W	D	L	GF	GA	GD	Pts	Qualification or relegation
1	AEK Athens (Note: AEK Athens were deducted 3 points due to extreme fan behavior.) (Q)	24	22	2	0	67	10	+57	65	Qualification to promotion play-offs
2	Panachaiki (Q)	24	14	4	6	41	22	+19	46	Qualification to promotion play-offs
3	Apollon Smyrnis (Q)	24	13	6	5	32	17	+15	45	Qualification to promotion play-offs
4	Chania	24	12	6	6	28	20	+8	42	
5	Enosi Ermionida (Q)	24	12	5	7	30	28	+2	41	Qualification to relegation play-offs
6	Panegialios (Q)	24	11	7	6	24	12	+12	40	Qualification to relegation play-offs
7	Acharnaikos (Q)	24	9	8	7	28	22	+6	35	Qualification to relegation play-offs
8	Kallithea (Q)	24	9	6	9	25	25	0	33	Qualification to relegation play-offs
9	Episkopi (Q)	24	7	5	12	25	34	−9	26	Qualification to relegation play-offs
10	Iraklis Psachna (Q)	24	6	5	13	23	37	−14	23	Qualification to relegation play-offs
11	Alimos (R)	24	5	6	13	15	25	−10	21	Relegation to Gamma Ethniki
12	Fostiras (R)	24	4	3	17	20	43	−23	15	Relegation to Gamma Ethniki
13	Paniliakos (Note: Paniliakos withdrew from the league on 15 December 2014.) (R)	24	0	1	23	7	70	−63	1	Relegation to Gamma Ethniki

Source: Football League
Rules for classification: 1) points, 2) head-to-head points
(Q) Qualified for the phase indicated; (R) Relegated

=== Matches ===
Home \ Away	AEK	ACH	ALI	APS	CHA	ENE	EPI	FOS	IPS	KLT	PCK	PEG	PNL
AEK Athens		2–0	3–0	2–1	4–1	4–0	7–0	4–0	5–1	5–1	2–1	3–0	3–0^{1}
Acharnaikos	1–2		0–0	0–0	0–0	0–2	4–2	1–1	0–0	1–0	4–2	0–1	3–1
Alimos	0–1	0–1		0–1	1–2	3–2	0–0	2–0	2–0	0–2	0–1	0–0	1–1
Apollon Smyrnis	1–1	1–0	2–0		1–0	4–2	1–0	1–0	2–1	1–0	0–0	1–1	4–2
Chania	0–2	2–2	1–0	0–0		1–3	2–0	1–0	3–0	2–1	2–1	1–0	3–0^{1}
Enosi Ermionida	0–0	2–1	2–0	1–0	0–0		1–0	2–1	1–0	1–1	0–2	1–0	3–0^{1}
Episkopi	0–2	1–1	0–2	3–1	0–1	4–1		2–3	2–0	1–1	1–2	0–0	2–1
Fostiras	1–3	0–2	1–0	0–2	0–0	1–1	0–1		1–2	1–4	1–2	0–3	3–0^{1}
Iraklis Psachna	1–3	0–2	0–0	2–1	1–1	0–2	1–3	4–2		2–0	1–1	1–2	3–0^{1}
Kallithea	0–2	1–1	1–1	0–3	1–0	0–0	2–0	1–0	0–0		2–1	1–0	3–0^{1}
Panachaiki	1–3	2–0	3–0	1–0	1–2	3–0	1–0	3–1	3–0	2–0		0–0	3–0^{1}
Panegialios	0–1	0–1	1–0	1–1	2–0	3–0	0–0	2–0	1–0	1–0	1–1		3–0^{1}
Paniliakos	0–3^{1}	0–3^{1}	0–3^{1}	0–3^{1}	0–3^{1}	0–3^{1}	0–3^{1}	0–3^{1}	0–3^{1}	0–3^{1}	2–4	0–2	

Legend: Blue = home team win; Yellow = draw; Red = away team win.
- ^{1} The opponents of Paniliakos awarded a 3–0 w/o win each.

== Promotion play-offs ==
Pos	Team	Pld	W	D	L	GF	GA	GD	Pts	Promotion
1	AEK Athens (C, P)	10	5	3	2	14	9	+5	28	Promotion to Super League
2	Iraklis (P)	10	6	1	3	10	5	+5	26	Promotion to Super League
3	Apollon Smyrnis	10	6	2	2	16	10	+6	20	
4	AEL	10	4	1	5	10	11	−1	13	
5	Olympiacos Volos	10	3	1	6	8	12	−4	10	
6	Panachaiki	10	1	2	7	12	23	−11	5	

Source: Football League
Rules for classification: 1) points; 2) goal difference; 3) number of goals scored.
(C) Champions; (P) Promoted

=== Matches ===
Home \ Away	AEK	AEL	APS	IRT	OVL	PCK
AEK Athens		1–1	2–1	1–0	1–0	3–0
AEL	0–1		0–1	0–2	3–0	1–0
Apollon Smyrnis	3–3	3–1		1–0	0–0	2–0
Iraklis	2–1	1–0	0–1		1–0	2–0
Olympiacos Volos	1–0	0–1	0–1	0–1		4–3
Panachaiki	1–1	2–3	4–3	1–1	1–3	

Legend: Blue = home team win; Yellow = draw; Red = away team win.

== Relegation play-offs ==
=== North Group ===
Pos	Team	Pld	W	D	L	GF	GA	GD	Pts	Relegation
1	Agrotikos Asteras	10	7	1	2	16	7	+9	22	
2	Zakynthos	10	4	2	4	14	10	+4	20	
3	Anagennisi Karditsa	10	5	2	3	11	12	−1	19	
4	Tyrnavos (R)	10	5	2	3	12	8	+4	17	Relegation to Gamma Ethniki
5	Aiginiakos (R)	10	4	2	4	12	5	+7	15	Relegation to Gamma Ethniki
6	Pierikos (Note: Pierikos withdrew from Relegation play-offs on 15 May 2015.) (R)	10	0	1	9	0	20	−20	−3	Relegation to Gamma Ethniki

Source: Football League
Rules for classification: 1) points; 2) goal difference; 3) number of goals scored.
(R) Relegated

=== Matches ===
Home \ Away	AGR	EGN	KRD	PIE	TYR	ZAK
Agrotikos Asteras		2–1	5–0	1–0	1–0	0–0
Aiginiakos	3–0		1–1	3–0 (Note: The opponents of Pierikos awarded a 3–0 w/o win each.)	0–1	1–0
Anagennisi Karditsa	0–1	1–0		3–0	2–1	3–1
Pierikos	0–3	0–3	0–0		0–1	0–3
Tyrnavos	2–1	0–0	1–0	3–0		2–2
Zakynthos	1–2	1–0	1–2	3–0	2–0	

Legend: Blue = home team win; Yellow = draw; Red = away team win.

=== South Group ===
Pos	Team	Pld	W	D	L	GF	GA	GD	Pts	Relegation
1	Acharnaikos	10	7	1	2	13	9	+4	26	
2	Panegialios	10	5	2	3	12	9	+3	23	
3	Kallithea	10	5	3	2	16	8	+8	21	
4	Enosi Ermionida (R)	10	4	1	5	15	13	+2	21	Relegation to Gamma Ethniki
5	Iraklis Psachna (R)	10	3	4	3	11	9	+2	13	Relegation to Gamma Ethniki
6	Episkopi (R)	10	0	1	9	4	20	−16	1	Relegation to Gamma Ethniki

Source: Football League
Rules for classification: 1) points; 2) goal difference; 3) number of goals scored.
(R) Relegated

=== Matches ===
Home \ Away	ACH	ENE	EPI	IPS	KLT	PEG
Acharnaikos		3–1	2–1	1–0	0–2	2–1
Enosi Ermionida	3–1		5–1	0–1	1–1	3–1
Episkopi	0–1	0–2		1–1	0–2	0–1
Iraklis Psachna	1–1	2–0	2–0		1–1	2–3
Kallithea	0–1	1–0	3–1	2–1		0–0
Panegialios	0–1	2–0	1–0	0–0	3–1	

Legend: Blue = home team win; Yellow = draw; Red = away team win.

== Season statistics ==
=== Top scorers ===
Updated to games played 14 June 2015

Rank	Player	Club	Goals
1	(Greece) Christos Aravidis	AEK Athens	17
4	(Greece) Giannis Loukinas	Iraklis	15
4	(Greece) Dimitrios Diamantopoulos	Olympiacos Volos	15
4	(Serbia) Marko Pavićević	Ermionida	15
6	(Serbia) Ivan Jesić	Acharnaikos	14
6	(Spain) Igor Angulo	Apollon Smyrnis	14
7	(Greece) Vasilios Tabakis	Acharnaikos	13
8	(Greece) Leonidas Kyvelidis	Apollon Smyrnis / Panachaiki	10
9	(Greece) Mattheos Maroukakis	Panachaiki	9
12	(Serbia) Ivan Brečević	AEK Athens	8
12	(Greece) Petros Mantalos	AEK Athens	8
12	(Greece) Vangelis Platellas	AEK Athens	8
