= Giannis Loukinas =

Greek footballer

Personal information
- Full name: Ioannis Loukinas
- Date of birth: 20 September 1991 (age 35)
- Place of birth: Athens, Greece
- Height: 1.85 m (6 ft 1 in)
- Position: Striker

Team information
- Current team: Niki Volos
- Number: 25

Youth career
- 2002–2007: Agia Paraskevi
- 2006–2007: → Olympiacos (loan)

Senior career*
Years	Team	Apps	(Gls)
2007–2009	Agia Paraskevi	29	(6)
2009–2011	Panionios	2	(0)
2010	→ AEL Kalloni (loan)	14	(5)
2011	→ PAO Rouf (loan)	8	(2)
2011–2012	Niki Volos	24	(3)
2012–2013	Fokikos	26	(3)
2013–2014	Chania	35	(9)
2014–2017	Iraklis	69	(18)
2017–2018	Karaiskakis	29	(11)
2018–2019	PAS Giannina	3	(4)
2019–2020	Platanias	39	(23)
2020–2021	Veria	17	(9)
2021–2022	Kalamata	32	(21)
2022–2025	Athens Kallithea	94	(48)
2025–	Niki Volos	24	(16)

International career^{‡}
2009	Greece U19	2	(0)
- * Club domestic league appearances and goals as of 20 April 2026 ‡ National team caps and goals as of 23 July 2014

Giannis Loukinas (Greek: Γιάννης Λουκίνας; born 20 September 1991) is a Greek professional footballer who plays as a striker for Super League 2 club Niki Volos.

A prolific scorer, Loukinas has registered more than 100 career goals in Greek league and cup competitions.

== Club career ==
=== Early career ===
Loukinas started his football in the academy of Agia Paraskevi. After scoring twice against Olympiacos in friendly matches, he was signed on loan by Olympiacos and moved to the club's U20 squad. After a year at Olympiacos, he returned to Agia Paraskevi, where he broke through the first team in the 2008–09 season, appearing in 29 matches and scoring six goals.

His performances earned him a transfer to Super League 1 club Panionios. Loukinas made his first team debut in a home defeat against AEL. He would play in one more match before he was loaned out to AEL Kalloni and PAO Rouf.

In the 2011–12 season he was indispensable for Niki Volos appearing in all but four matches and scoring three goals in the club's push for promotion.

He played for Fokikos in the 2012–13 season making 24 appearances with three goals before a hernia injury forced him out for the rest of the season.

On 3 August 2013, Loukinas signed for Chania. His first goal for Chania was an injury time winner against Acharnaikos on 24 November 2013. He would play 34 matches for Chania on the season, scoring nine goals.

=== Iraklis ===
On 11 July 2014 he signed a three-year contract with Greek Football League side Iraklis. Loukinas debuted for his new club in the opening match of the season, a cup match against Lamia. He scored twice in his league debut for Iraklis in a win away to Tyrnavos. On 20 May 20, 2015, Loukinas scored the winner against AEL to lift Iraklis back to Super League 1. In total, Loukinas scored 15 goals between league and playoffs in the 2014/15 season to help Iraklis earn their promotion, and he spent the next two seasons with the club in the top flight.

=== Karaiskakis, Giannina, Platanias, Veria ===
From Iraklis, he would move on to Karaiskakis, PAS Giannina, Platanias, and Veria, scoring at least nine goals in each of the next four seasons.

=== Kalamata ===
In July 2021, Loukinas signed for Kalamata and enjoyed the best season of his career as top scorer in Super League 2's South Group with 21 goals in 2021/22.

=== Athens Kallithea ===
In July 2022, Loukinas joined Athens Kallithea. In the 2022/23 season, Loukinas was the top scorer in the south group of Super League 2 with 19 goals.

== International career ==
Loukinas has made his debut for Greece U-19 on 25 May 2009 in a home defeat against Portugal U-19. He made one more appearance three days later on a match against Denmark U-19.

== Personal life ==
Zlatan Ibrahimović is Loukinas' idol and Manchester United is his favourite club abroad.
