= Serres F.C. =

Disbanded association football club in Greece

F.C. Serres
- Full name: Ποδοσφαιρικός Σύλλογος «Σέρρες» (Football Club "Serres")
- Founded: 1951; 74 years ago (as M.G.S. Ethnikos Gazorou); 2014; 11 years ago (as Serres F.C.)
- Dissolved: 2019; 6 years ago
- Ground: Serres Municipal Stadium
- Capacity: 9,500
Home colours	Away colours

Football Club "Serres" (Greek: Ποδοσφαιρικός Σύλλογος «Σέρρες») was a Greek association football club, based in Serres. They played their home matches at Serres Municipal Stadium.

The club was founded in 1951 as M.G.S. Ethnikos Gazorou (Greek: Μ.Γ.Σ. Εθνικός Γαζώρου), based in Gazoros. In the 2011–12 season, Ethnikos Gazoros won the Northern Group of the Greek Football League 2.

== Honours ==
- Football League 2
  - Champions (1): 2012
