= 2012–13 Iraklis F.C. season =

G.S. Iraklis Thessalonikis 2012–13 association football season

Iraklis
2012–13 season
- President: Theodoros Papadopoulos
- Manager: Georgios Strantzalis (until 14 January 2013); Georgios Chatzaras (from 16 January to 18 January 2013); Giannis Chatzinikolaou (from 21 January 2013 to 28 May 2013); Siniša Gogić (from 29 May 2013)
- Stadium: Kaftanzoglio Stadium
- Football League: 6th
- Greek Football Cup: First round
- Top goalscorer: League: Hristijan Kirovski (12); All: Hristijan Kirovski (12)
Home colours	Away colours

The 2012–2013 season was Iraklis' first season in the Football League since 1980-81 and second overall. Iraklis finished 6th in the Football League, thus qualifying for the division's Play-offs. Their 2nd place in the Play-offs was not enough to earn promotion to the Super League Greece.

The "blue-whites" lost their single Greek Cup game to Proodeftiki and were eliminated from the competition early, in October 2012.

== Players ==
=== First team ===
No.	Name	Nationality	Position	Date of birth (age)	Signed from	Signed in	Apps.	Goals
Goalkeepers
1	Huanderson Junior da Silva Santos	(Brazil)	GK	August 3, 1983 (age 43)	Rio Ave	2012	0	0
13	Panagiotis Papadopoulos	(Greece)	GK	April 2, 1988 (age 38)	Vataniakos	2013	0	0
33	Panagiotis Vosniadis	(Greece)	GK	July 27, 1989 (age 37)	AEL	2012	0	0
37	Georgios Papadopoulos	(Greece)	GK	January 28, 1994 (age 32)	Iraklis Academy	2012	0	0
Defenders
4	Nikolaos Savidis	(Greece)	DF	July 20, 1992 (age 34)	Panserraikos	2011	6	0
5	Stefanos Kragiopoulos	(Greece)	CB	January 31, 1990 (age 36)	Pierikos	2012	0	0
6	Angelos Papasterianos (VC)	(Greece)	CB	July 11, 1991 (age 35)	Iraklis Academy	2011	12	0
16	Nikos Troiris	(Greece)	RB	December 2, 1986 (age 39)	Pontioi Katerini	2012	15	0
22	Antonis Natsouras (C)	(Greece)	CB	December 18, 1979 (age 46)	Panthrakikos	2012	60	1
23	Dani López	(Spain)	LB	October 7, 1983 (age 42)	Alavés	2012	0	0
26	Christos Paligiorgos	(Greece)	CB	June 6, 1988 (age 38)	Platanias	2013	0	0
29	Dimitrios Tserkezos	(Greece)	RB/LB	December 1, 1987 (age 38)	Anagennisi Epanomi	2013	0	0
47	Stavros Vagelopoulos	(Greece)	CB	August 21, 1980 (age 46)	Panthrakikos	2012	0	0
Midfielders
7	Akis Georgiou	(Greece)	MF	July 20, 1986 (age 40)	Aetos Skydra	2012	13	4
10	Alexandros Natsiopoulos	(Greece)	MF	January 5, 1991 (age 35)	Iraklis Academy	2011	8	0
12	Savvas Siatravanis	(Greece)	AM	November 24, 1992 (age 33)	AEL	2013	0	0
14	Isaac Jové Rubí	(Spain)	LM	February 21, 1980 (age 46)	Murcia	2012	0	0
18	Alexandros Mavridis	(Greece)	MF	February 12, 1993 (age 33)	Iraklis Academy	2011	0	0
20	Julien Fernandes	(Portugal)	DM	March 16, 1985 (age 41)	Cartagena	2012	0	0
23	Artan Thorja	(Albania)	MF	March 9, 1993 (age 33)	Iraklis Academy	2012	0	0
28	Nikos Soulidis	(Greece)	RW/LW	October 28, 1986 (age 39)	Tyrnavos	2012	0	0
31	Charalambos Sarafoglou	(Greece)	MF	January 2, 1993 (age 33)	Iraklis Academy	2011	7	0
32	German Datidis	(Greece)	DM	May 30, 1990 (age 36)	Anagennisi Giannitsa	2013	0	0
44	Alexandros Lavidas	(Greece)	MF	December 3, 1996 (age 29)	Iraklis Academy	2012	0	0
66	Giorgos Paligiorgos	(Greece)	MF	February 9, 1990 (age 36)	Ethnikos Asteras	2012	12	1
69	Kendal Ucar	(France)	DM	September 3, 1981 (age 45)	Platanias	2013	0	0
70	Antoni Lluís Adrover Colom "Tuni"	(Spain)	AM	June 14, 1982 (age 44)	Free agent	2013	0	0
87	Taianan Linhares Welker	(Brazil)	AM	March 13, 1987 (age 39)	SV Grödig	2013	0	0
99	Paschalis Voutsias	(Greece)	RW	March 23, 1990 (age 36)	Panserraikos	2012	16	1
Forwards
9	Giorgos Chionidis	(Greece)	FW	June 25, 1991 (age 35)	Pontioi Katerini	2012	14	3
11	Nestoras Stefanidis (VC)	(Greece)	FW	April 13, 1984 (age 42)	Panserraikos	2012	0	0
90	Hristijan Kirovski	(North Macedonia)	FW	October 12, 1985 (age 40)	Ironi Ramat HaSharon	2013	0	0
92	Christos Alexiou	(Greece)	FW	September 21, 1992 (age 34)	Tyrnavos 2005	2013	0	0

== Transfers ==
=== In ===
==== Summer ====
Date	Player	From	Fee	Source
3 July 2012	(Greece) Giannis Firinidis	(Greece) Anagennisi Epanomi F.C.	Free	
12 July 2012	(Greece) Stavros Vagelopoulos	(Greece) Panthrakikos F.C.	Free	
12 July 2012	(Greece) Nestoras Stefanidis	(Greece) Panserraikos F.C.	Free	
16 July 2012	(Greece) Nikos Liolios	(Greece) Rouf F.C.	Free	
4 August 2012	(Greece) Nikos Soulidis	(Greece) Tyrnavos 2005 F.C.	Free	
7 August 2012	(Greece) Giorgos Papadopoulos	(Greece) Iraklis Academy	Free	
24 August 2012	(Greece) Charidimos Michos	(Greece) Kerkyra	Free	
27 August 2012	(Greece) Paschalis Voutsias	(Greece) Panserraikos F.C.	Free	
29 August 2012	(Greece) Panagiotis Vosniadis	(Greece) AEL	Free	
29 August 2012	(Greece) Manolis Liapakis	(Greece) Panthrakikos F.C.	Free	
30 August 2012	(Greece) Stefanos Kragiopoulos	(Greece) Pierikos	Free	
4 September 2012	(Greece) Konstantinos Lekos	(Greece) Achilleas Triandria Academy	Free	
16 September 2012	(Spain) Dani López	(Spain) Deportivo Alavés	Free	
16 September 2012	(Portugal) Julien Fernandes	(Spain) FC Cartagena	Free	
23 September 2012	(Spain) Isaac Jové Rubí	(Spain) Real Murcia	Free	
25 September 2012	(Brazil) Huanderson	(Portugal) Rio Ave F.C.	Free	
27 September 2012	(Guinea) Ibrahima Bangoura	(Azerbaijan) FK Khazar Lankaran	Free	

==== Winter ====
Date	Player	From	Fee	Source
19 December 2012	(Greece) Dimitrios Tserkezos	(Greece) Anagennisi Epanomi F.C.	Free	
3 January 2013	(Greece) Savvas Siatravanis	(Greece) AEL	Free	
8 January 2013	(Greece) Christos Alexiou	(Greece) Tyrnavos 2005 F.C.	Free	
9 January 2013	(North Macedonia) Hristijan Kirovski	(Israel) Ironi Nir Ramat HaSharon F.C.	Free	
11 January 2013	(Spain) Antoni Lluís Adrover Colom	Free agent	Free	
12 January 2013	(Greece) Panagiotis Papadopoulos	(Greece) Vataniakos F.C.	Free	
15 January 2013	(Greece) German Datidis	(Greece) Anagennisi Giannitsa F.C.	Free	
30 January 2013	(Greece) Christos Paligiorgos	(Greece) Platanias F.C.	Free	
30 January 2013	(France) Kendal Ucar	(Greece) Platanias F.C.	Free	
30 January 2013	(Brazil) Taianan	(Austria) SV Grödig	Free	

=== Out ===
==== Summer ====
Date	Player	To	Fee	Source
14 June 2012	(Greece) Vassilis Liolios	(Greece) Aiginiakos F.C.	Free	
14 June 2012	(Greece) Nikos Triantafillidis	(Greece) Vataniakos F.C.	Free	
14 June 2012	(Greece) Christos Kelpekis	End of career	–	
14 June 2012	(Greece) Michalis Ilias	(Greece) Vataniakos F.C.	Free	
14 June 2012	(Greece) Dionysis Chasiotis	End of career	–	
14 June 2012	(Greece) Kostas Ikonomou		Free	
14 June 2012	(Greece) Miltiadis Sapanis	End of career	–	
28 June 2012	(Greece) Grigoris Pitsokos	(Greece) Apollon Kalamarias F.C.	Free	
30 June 2012	(Greece) Charis Kostakis	(Greece) PAS Giannina F.C.	Free	
19 July 2012	(Greece) Dimitris Papatolikas	(Greece) Pierikos	Free	
19 July 2012	(Greece) Giannis Kofos	(Greece) Aiginiakos F.C.	Free	

==== Winter ====
Date	Player	To	Fee	Source
12 December 2012	(Greece) Nikos Liolios		Free	
18 December 2012	(Greece) Giannis Firinidis	(Greece) AEL	Free	
2 January 2013	(Greece) Manolis Liapakis	(Greece) AEL	Free	
8 January 2013	(Greece) Billy Konstantinidis	(Greece) Ethnikos Gazoros F.C.	Free	
22 January 2013	(Guinea) Ibrahima Bangoura		Free	
24 January 2013	(Serbia) Radovan Krivokapić	(Cyprus) Enosis Neon Paralimni FC	Free	
26 January 2013	(Greece) Charidimos Michos	(Greece) Anagennisi Karditsa F.C.	Free	

=== Loan out ===
Start date	Player	To	End date	Source
4 January 2013	(Greece) Kosmas Tsilianidis	(Greece) Aiginiakos F.C.	June 2013	
4 January 2013	(Greece) Ioannis Moisidis	(Greece) Vataniakos F.C.	June 2013	
23 January 2013	(Greece) Kiriakos Kivrakidis	(Greece) Aiginiakos F.C.	June 2013	

== Club ==
=== Coaching staff ===
Position	Staff
Head coach	(Serbia) Siniša Gogić
Assistant coach	(Greece) Dimitris Moutas
General manager	(Greece) Giorgos Karaiskos
Physical trainer	(Greece) Sakis Pantelidis
Goalkeeper trainer	(Greece) Fotios Gizelis
Doctor	(Greece) Manolis Papakostas
Physiotherapist	(Greece) Konstantinos Tsiolakidis
Care taker	(Greece) Georgios Siagas
Youth team manager	(Greece) Giannis Pagonis
Academy director	(Ghana) Ebenezer Hagan

Last updated: May 2013
Source: iraklisfc.gr

=== Other information ===
Chairman	(Greece) Theodoros Papadopoulos
Vice Presidents	(Greece) Georgios Manikas (Greece) Argiris Asfaltidis
Team Director	(Greece) Georgios Bezas
Ground (capacity and dimensions)	Kaftanzoglio Stadium (28,028 / 68x105 m)
Training ground	Mikra Training Center

Source: kaftanzoglio.gr

=== Kit ===
Supplier: Legea
Sponsor(s): OPAP, CYTA, A21 Campaign

Home	Away	Third kit

== Pre-season and friendlies ==
6 August 2012	Anagennisi Giannitsa	0 – 1	Iraklis	Giannitsa
18:30 EEST		Report	Stefanidis 38' (o.g.)	Stadium: Giannitsa Stadium

9 August 2012	Iraklis	0 – 0	Kerkyra	Katerini
20:00 EEST		Report		Stadium: Municipal Stadium of Katerini

17 August 2012	Aiginiakos	2 – 0	Iraklis	Aiginio
18:30 EEST	Exarchos 3'; Doulas 80'	Report		Stadium: Aiginio Stadium

22 August 2012	Iraklis	0 – 0	Apollon Smyrnis	Ampelokipoi
18:30 EEST		Report		Stadium: Konstantinos Karamanlis Stadium

2 September 2012	Olympiacos Volos	1 – 2	Iraklis	Volos
18:00 EEST	Oyarbide 50' (pen.)	Report	Devallis 22' (o.g.); Konstantinidis 74'	Stadium: Volos Municipal Stadium

9 September 2012	Vataniakos	4 – 2	Iraklis	Katerini
18:00 EEST	Tsitlakidis 15'; Potouridis 19' (pen.); Manikas 66', 86'	Report	Stefanidis 39'; Konstantinidis 65'	Stadium: Vataniakos Stadium

15 September 2012	Iraklis	2 – 0	Odysseas Kordelio	Thessaloniki
	Stefanidis 10', 90+4'	Report		Stadium: Kaftanzoglio Stadium

23 September 2012	Iraklis	2 – 1	Olympiacos Volos	Thessaloniki
16:30 EEST	Voutsias 52'; Chionidis 77'	Report	Paleologos 43'	Stadium: Kaftanzoglio Stadium; Referee: Giannis Matekas

14 October 2012	Iraklis	2 – 3	Veria	Thessaloniki
16:00 EEST	Lekos 6'; Bangoura 49'	Report	Ioannou 7'; Kaltsas 27'; Orestes (yellow card) 32'; Olaitan 86'	Stadium: Kaftanzoglio Stadium

30 December 2012	Iraklis	4 – 1	Ethnikos Agioneri	Thessaloniki
14:30 EET	Krivokapić 9'; Stefanidis 12', 27'; Isaac 60'	Report	Chairopoulos 45'	Stadium: Kaftanzoglio Stadium

23 January 2013	Iraklis	1 – 1	Litex Lovech	Thessaloniki
15:30 EET	Tuni 59'	Report	Vanger 32'	Stadium: Mikra Training Center

== Football League ==
=== League table ===
Pos	Team	Pld	W	D	L	GF	GA	GD	Pts	Promotion or relegation
4	Panetolikos (P)	40	20	13	7	55	23	+32	73 (Note: Head-to-head record: AEL Kalloni: 8 pts, Panetolikos: 4 pts, Olympiacos Volos: 3 pts.)	Qualification for promotion play-offs
5	Olympiacos Volos	40	19	16	5	49	23	+26	73	Qualification for promotion play-offs
6	Iraklis	40	19	14	7	49	25	+24	71	Qualification for promotion play-offs
7	Niki Volos	40	17	17	6	44	23	+21	68 (Note: Head-to-head record: Niki Volos–Panserraikos 3–0, Panserraikos–Niki Volos 0–1.)	Qualification for promotion play-offs
8	Panserraikos (R)	40	19	11	10	40	29	+11	68	Relegation to Gamma Ethniki

Source: Football League standings
Rules for classification: 1st points; 2nd head-to-head points; 3rd head-to-head goal difference
(P) Promoted; (R) Relegated

==== Results summary ====
Overall								Home						Away					
Pld	W	D	L	GF	GA	GD	Pts	W	D	L	GF	GA	GD	W	D	L	GF	GA	GD
40	19	14	7	49	25	+24	71	9	7	4	26	14	+12	10	7	3	23	11	+12

Last updated: 26 May 2013.
Source: Competitive matches

==== Results by round ====
Round	1	2	3	4	5	6	7	8	9	10	11	12	13	14	15	16	17	18	19	20	21	22	23	24	25	26	27	28	29	30	31	32	33	34	35	36	37	38	39	40	41	42
Ground	H	A	H	A	—	A	H	A	H	H	A	H	A	H	A	H	A	H	A	H	A	A	H	A	H	—	H	A	H	A	A	H	A	H	A	H	A	H	A	H	A	H
Result	D	D	W	L	—	W	D	D	W	D	D	W	W	D	D	D	D	W	D	L	L	W	W	W	D	—	D	W	L	W	W	L	D	W	W	W	W	W	W	W	L	L
Position	10	12	8	12	15	9	10	12	10	11	9	7	5	6	5	5	5	5	6	8	10	9	8	5	5	7	7	4	10	7	4	7	8	7	5	5	3	2	2	2	5	6

A = Away; H = Home; W = Win; D = Draw; L = Loss

==== Matches ====
29 September 2012 1	Iraklis	3 – 3	Ethnikos Gazoros	Thessaloniki
16:45 EEST	Chionidis 26', 46', (yellow card) 47'; Papasterianos (yellow card) 29', (goal) 84'; Krivokapić (yellow card) 50'; Paligiorgos (yellow card) 76' (yellow-red card) 80'	Summary; Live TV:	Aleksandrowicz 5', 66', (yellow card) 9'; Charitidis (yellow card) 28'; Kapias (yellow card) 52'; Katsavakis (yellow card) 72', (goal) 83'; Georgiadis (yellow card) 86'	Stadium: Kaftanzoglio Stadium; Referee: Christos Granas (Xanthi)

2 October 2012 2	Panachaiki	0 – 0	Iraklis	Aigio
18:30 EEST	Karamanlis (yellow card) 62'; M'Pia (yellow card) 90+2'	Summary; Live TV: OTE Sport	Papasterianos (yellow card) 79'; Isaac (yellow card) 90'	Stadium: Aigio National Stadium; Referee: Giorgos Giannoulakis (Chania)

7 October 2012 3	Iraklis	2 – 1	Thrasyvoulos	Thessaloniki
16:45 EEST	Krivokapić (yellow card) 14', (goal) 54'; Michos (yellow card) 45+1'; Paligiorgos (yellow card) 57'; Isaac 90'; Firinidis (yellow card) 90+2'	Summary; Live TV:	Plavoukos 11', (yellow card) 48'; Beka (yellow card) 22'; Panos (yellow card) 58'; Da Costa (yellow card) 79'; Bakalis (yellow card) 90+2'	Stadium: Kaftanzoglio Stadium; Referee: Giorgos Kiriazidis (Evros)

10 October 2012 4	Niki Volos	1 – 0	Iraklis	Volos
19:00 EEST	Tadić (yellow card) 23'; Mitsis 90+1'; Karakoutsis (yellow card) 90+6'	Summary; Live TV: OTE Sport	Stefanidis (yellow card) 31'; Paligiorgos (yellow card) 45'; Krivokapić (yellow card) 51'; Troiris (yellow card) 70'; López (yellow card) 76'; Vagelopoulos (yellow card) 80'	Stadium: Panthessaliko Stadium; Referee: Spiros Selimos (Laconia)

5	v
Note: Iraklis has a day off

20 October 2012 6	Ergotelis	0 – 1	Iraklis	Heraklion
15:00 EEST	Daskalakis (red card) 34'	Summary; Live TV: OTE Sport	Chionidis (yellow card) 25'; López (yellow card) 28'; Stefanidis 35' (pen.); Michos (yellow card) 39'; Georgiou (yellow card) 90+3'; Firinidis (yellow card) 90+5'	Stadium: Pankritio Stadium; Referee: Evangelos Kordolemis (Piraeus)

4 November 2012 7	Iraklis	1 – 1	Iraklis Psachna	Thessaloniki
15:00 EET	Papasterianos (yellow card) 29' (yellow-red card) 87'; Voutsias 71'; Fernandes (yellow card) 76'; Stefanidis (yellow card) 90'	Summary; Live TV:	Chaikalis 40'; Vangjeli (yellow card) 57'; Liosis (yellow card) 82'	Stadium: Kaftanzoglio Stadium; Referee: Evangelos Kiotzenis (Kavala)

12 November 2012 8	Apollon Smyrnis	1 – 1	Iraklis	Athens
19:00 EET	Chatzizisis (yellow card) 60'; Tsiligiris (yellow card) 66'; Manias 78'	Summary; Live TV: OTE Sport	López (yellow card) 24'; Isaac (yellow card) 45', (goal) 48'	Stadium: Georgios Kamaras Stadium; Referee: Nikolaos Anousos (Laconia)

18 November 2012 9	Iraklis	3 – 0	Pierikos	Thessaloniki
15:00 EET	Fernandes 14'; Michos (yellow card) 45'; Stefanidis 55'; Soulidis (yellow card) 69'; Isaac 81'	Summary; Live TV:	Despotovski (yellow card) 6' (yellow-red card) 8'; Koic (yellow card) 11'; Tolios (yellow card) 74'	Stadium: Kaftanzoglio Stadium; Referee: Panagiotis Koemtzidis (Kozani)

21 November 2012 10	Iraklis	0 – 0	Doxa Drama	Thessaloniki
15:00 EET	Stefanidis (yellow card) 35'; Natsiopoulos (yellow card) 39'	Summary; Live TV:	Milenković (yellow card) 18'; Perperidis (yellow card) 30'; Stergianos (yellow card) 63'	Stadium: Kaftanzoglio Stadium; Referee: Ioannis Kabaxis (Euboea)

25 November 2012 11	AEL Kalloni	1 – 1	Iraklis	Mytilene
15:00 EET	Anastasiadis (yellow card) 16'; Manousos 40'; Marcelo (yellow card) 59'; Leozinho (yellow card) 68'	Summary; Live TV:	Stefanidis 22'; Paligiorgos (yellow card) 31'; Bangoura (yellow card) 53'; Michos (yellow card) 64'; Fernandes (yellow card) 68'; Voutsias (yellow card) 86'	Stadium: Municipal Stadium of Mytilene; Referee: Christos Granas (Xanthi)

2 December 2012 12	Iraklis	1 – 0	Kavala	Thessaloniki
15:00 EET	Stefanidis 45' (pen.); Savidis (yellow card) 67'; Michos (yellow card) 75'; Paligiorgos (yellow card) 86'	Summary; Live TV:	Kalaganis (yellow card) 40'; Pagonis (yellow card) 44'; Marko dos Santos (yellow card) 65'	Stadium: Kaftanzoglio Stadium; Referee: Angelos Evagelou (Athens)

9 December 2012 13	Vyzas	0 – 2	Iraklis	Megara
15:00 EET	Reklitis (yellow card) 43'; Gemisis (yellow card) 45'; Diallo (yellow card) 45'	Summary; Live TV:	Georgiou 27'; Liapakis (yellow card) 70'; Chionidis 78'	Stadium: Stadium of Megara; Referee: Ioannis Mourtzakis (Heraklion)

16 December 2012 14	Iraklis	2 – 2	Fokikos	Thessaloniki
15:00 EET	Stefanidis 5', (yellow card) 80'; Papasterianos (yellow card) 38'; Bangoura 61'; Chionidis (yellow card) 62'; Fernandes (yellow card) 74'; López (yellow card) 82'; Michos (yellow card) 84'	Summary; Live TV:	Efstathiou (yellow card) 3'; Tetteh 11', 54'; Papazoudis (yellow card) 16'; Ngwem (red card) 38'; Skaribas (yellow card) 83'	Stadium: Kaftanzoglio Stadium; Referee: Fotis Fotiadis (Kastoria)

6 January 2013 15	AEL	0 – 0	Iraklis	Larissa
18:00 EET	Dinopapas (yellow card) 11'; Tsigas (yellow card) 34'; Seremet (yellow card) 82'	Summary; Live TV: OTE Sport	Savidis (yellow card) 13'; Tserkezos (yellow card) 52'; Fernandes (yellow card) 53'	Stadium: A.E.L. F.C. Arena; Referee: Iosif Sfakianakis (Athens)

14 January 2013 16	Iraklis	0 – 0	Kallithea	Thessaloniki
19:00 EET	Vagelopoulos (yellow card) 78'; Natsouras (yellow card) 80'; Georgiou (yellow card) 80'; Kivrakidis (yellow card) 90+3'	Summary; Live TV: OTE Sport	Katsikogiannis (yellow card) 61'; D'Acol (yellow card) 65'; Arvanitis (yellow card) 72'; Faye (yellow card) 76'; Maroukakis (yellow card) 89'; Theologou (yellow card) 90+3'	Stadium: Kaftanzoglio Stadium; Referee: Giorgos Giannoulakis (Chania)

20 January 2013 17	Panserraikos	2 – 2	Iraklis	Serres
18:30 EET	Triantafyllou (yellow card) 15' (yellow-red card) 46'; Anakoglou 52', 82'	Summary; Live TV: OTE Sport	Paligiorgos (yellow card) 15'; Isaac 51'; Fernandes (yellow card) 65'; Sarafoglou 88', (yellow card) 89'	Stadium: Serres Municipal Stadium; Referee: Evangelos Kiotzenis (Kavala)

27 January 2013 18	Iraklis	2 – 0	Anagennisi Epanomi	Thessaloniki
15:00 EET	Kirovski 10', 82'; Papasterianos (yellow card) 27'; Georgiou (yellow card) 36'; Fernandes (yellow card) 78'	Summary; Live TV:	Topouzis (yellow card) 49'; Koulidis (yellow card) 67'; Papastergiou (yellow card) 76'	Stadium: Kaftanzoglio Stadium; Referee: Dimitris Maloutas (Imathia)

1 February 2013 19	Anagennisi Giannitsa	0 – 0	Iraklis	Giannitsa
15:00 EET		Summary; Live TV: OTE Sport	Taianan (yellow card) 90+1'	Stadium: Giannitsa Stadium; Referee: Dimitris Karantonis (Imathia)

6 February 2013 20	Iraklis	0 – 1	Olympiacos Volos	Thessaloniki
18:00 EET	Huanderson (yellow card) 51'; Tserkezos (yellow card) 68'	Summary; Live TV: OTE Sport	Solakis 17', (yellow card) 45+1'; Petkakis (yellow card) 20'; Gogolos (yellow card) 36'; Tsiatsios (yellow card) 88'; Breška (yellow card) 90+2'	Stadium: Kaftanzoglio Stadium; Referee: Spiros Selimos (Laconia)

11 February 2013 21	Panetolikos	3 – 0	Iraklis	Agrinio
19:00 EET	Bojović 10', 45+2'; Favalli (yellow card) 34'; Taianan 60' (o.g.)	Summary; Live TV: OTE Sport	Taianan (yellow card) 17'; Papasterianos (yellow card) 58'; Kirovski (yellow card) 65'	Stadium: Panetolikos Stadium; Referee: Fotis Fotiadis (Kastoria)

17 February 2013 22	Ethnikos Gazoros	1 – 3	Iraklis	Serres
15:00 EET	Konstantinidis 3'; Kapias (yellow card) 35'; Macheroudis (yellow card) 40'; Zygeridis (yellow card) 76'	Summary; Live TV:	Soulidis 1'; Vagelopoulos 16'; G. Savidis 20' (o.g.); Taianan (yellow card) 60'; Stefanidis (yellow card) 65'; Savidis (yellow card) 74'	Stadium: Serres Municipal Stadium; Referee: Alexandros Katsikogianis (Epirus)
Note: Konstantinidis of Ethnikos Gazoros was booked (red card) after match for protesting referees decisions.

20 February 2013 23	Iraklis	Postponed	Panachaiki	Thessaloniki
15:00 EET		Live TV:		Stadium: Kaftanzoglio Stadium
Note: The match was postponed at the request of General Police Directorate of Thessaloniki.

24 February 2013 24	Thrasyvoulos	0 – 2	Iraklis	Fyli
15:00 EET	Plavoukos (yellow card) 63'; Bakalis (yellow card) 72'; Provatidis (yellow card) 78'; Stavrothanasopoulos (yellow card) 79' (yellow-red card)	Summary; Live TV:	Taianan 20'; Ch. Paligiorgos (yellow card) 52'; Vagelopoulos (yellow card) 62'; Savidis (yellow card) 78'; Tuni 85'; Huanderson (yellow card) 87'	Stadium: Fyli Stadium; Referee: Giorgos Blanas (Messenia)

27 February 2013 23	Iraklis	2 – 0	Panachaiki	Thessaloniki
15:00 EET	López (yellow card) 44'; Isaac 63'; Stefanidis (yellow card) 67'; Vagelopoulos 78'	Summary; Live TV:	Kokkinis (yellow card) 72'	Stadium: Kaftanzoglio Stadium; Referee: Aristomenis Koutsiaftis (Arta)

3 March 2013 25	Iraklis	0 – 0	Niki Volos	Thessaloniki
15:00 EET	Isaac (yellow card) 67'	Summary; Live TV:	Chatzis (yellow card) 54'	Stadium: Kaftanzoglio Stadium; Referee: Anastasios Papapetrou (Athens)

26	v
Note: Iraklis has a day off

13 March 2013 27	Iraklis	1 – 1	Ergotelis	Thessaloniki
19:00 EET	Soulidis (yellow card) 23'; G. Paligiorgos (yellow card) 45+2'; Tuni (yellow card) 60'; Vagelopoulos 90+6'	Summary; Live TV: OTE Sport	Kozoronis (yellow card) 38'; Romano (yellow card) 66'; Jovanović (yellow card) 72'; Huanderson 83' (o.g.); Lambin (yellow card) 90+3'	Stadium: Kaftanzoglio Stadium; Referee: Triantafyllos Tikas (Evrytania)

18 March 2013 28	Iraklis Psachna	0 – 3	Iraklis	Psachna
19:00 EET	Mitsis (yellow card) 29'; Oyarbide (yellow card) 41'; Repetsas (yellow card) 61' (yellow-red card) 83'; Segos (yellow card) 61'	Summary; Live TV: OTE Sport	Stefanidis (yellow card) 25', (goal) 85' (pen.); Ch. Paligiorgos (yellow card) 26'; Vagelopoulos (yellow card) 58'; Kirovski 89'; Soulidis (yellow card) 90'; Taianan 90+3'	Stadium: Local Stadium of Psachna; Referee: Georgios Foukakis (Heraklion)

23 March 2013 29	Iraklis	0 – 1	Apollon Smyrnis	Thessaloniki
18:00 EET	Chionidis (yellow card) 77'	Summary; Live TV: OTE Sport	Manias 21'; Iasonidis (yellow card) 42'; Chatzizisis (yellow card) 85'; Goumagias (yellow card) 90+3'	Stadium: Kaftanzoglio Stadium; Referee: Christos Granas (Xanthi)

27 March 2013 30	Pierikos	0 – 1	Iraklis	Katerini
17:00 EET	Iordanidis (yellow card) 60'	Summary; Live TV:	Huanderson (yellow card) 32'; Stefanidis 58'	Stadium: Municipal Stadium of Katerini; Referee: Charalabos Selemidis (Pella)

31 March 2013 31	Doxa Drama	0 – 2	Iraklis	Drama
18:00 EEST	Poulakos (yellow card) 68'; Taralidis (yellow card) 90+3'	Summary; Live TV: OTE Sport	Kirovski (yellow card) 29', (goal) 90'; Vagelopoulos (yellow card) 65'; Ucar 70'; Troiris (yellow card) 90+2'	Stadium: Doxa Drama Stadium; Referee: Iosif Sfakianakis (Athens)

7 April 2013 32	Iraklis	0 – 1	AEL Kalloni	Thessaloniki
16:00 EEST	Savidis (yellow card) 11'	Summary; Live TV:	Chorianopoulos (yellow card) 16'; Manousos 33'; Kandji (yellow card) 68'	Stadium: Kaftanzoglio Stadium; Referee: Giorgos Kiriazidis (Evros)

10 April 2013 33	Kavala	0 – 0	Iraklis	Kavala
16:00 EEST	Pagonis (yellow card) 27'; Theodoridis (yellow card) 70'; Kargas (yellow card) 75'; Chloros (yellow card) 79'; Doutsaridis (yellow card) 83'	Summary; Live TV:		Stadium: Anthi Karagianni Stadium; Referee: Christos Granas (Xanthi)

14 April 2013 34	Iraklis	3 – 0	Vyzas	Thessaloniki
16:00 EEST	Kirovski 21', 64'; Savidis 54'	Summary; Live TV:		Stadium: Kaftanzoglio Stadium; Referee: Apostolos Simeakis (Chalkidiki)

21 April 2013 35	Fokikos	0 – 1	Iraklis	Amfissa
16:00 EEST	Kostopoulos (yellow card) 22'; Gomez (yellow card) 45'; Skaribas (yellow card) 70'	Summary; Live TV:	Tserkezos (yellow card) 26'; Fernandes (yellow card) 42'; Savidis (yellow card) 45'; Siatravanis 49'	Stadium: Amfissa Municipal Stadium; Referee: Kostas Balatsoukas (Epirus)

24 April 2013 36	Iraklis	1 – 0	AEL	Thessaloniki
19:00 EEST	Kirovski 13' (pen.); Savidis (yellow card) 20'; G. Paligiorgos (yellow card) 71'; Fernandes (yellow card) 76'; Isaac (yellow card) 83'	Summary; Live TV: OTE Sport	Raptakis (yellow card) 13'; Hasomeris (yellow card) 90+4'	Stadium: Kaftanzoglio Stadium; Referee: Angelos Evagelou (Athens)

28 April 2013 37	Kallithea	0 – 1	Iraklis	Kallithea
17:00 EEST	Moustafidis (yellow card) 12'; Maroukakis (yellow card) 62'; Faye (yellow card) 66'; Piccolo (yellow card) 85'	Summary; Live TV:	Ch. Paligiorgos (yellow card) 30'; Taianan 61'	Stadium: Grigoris Lambrakis Stadium; Referee: Giannis Topouzis (Thrace)

12 May 2013 38	Iraklis	2 – 0	Panserraikos	Thessaloniki
17:00 EEST	Ucar (yellow card) 26'; G. Paligiorgos (yellow card) 30'; Taianan 36'; Kirovski 89'	Summary; Live TV:	D. Triantafyllou (yellow card) 41'; Panteliadis (yellow card) 54'; Paraskevaidis (yellow card) 67'; Tsoutsis (yellow card) 76' (yellow-red card) 90'	Stadium: Kaftanzoglio Stadium; Referee: Ioannis Kabaxis (Euboea)

15 May 2013 39	Anagennisi Epanomi	1 – 3	Iraklis	Epanomi
16:00 EEST	Kartal (yellow card) 16'; Tzandaris (yellow card) 53'; Papatzikos 80'	Summary; Live TV: OTE Sport	Siatravanis 23', 69'; Natsouras 32', (yellow card) 90+1'; Soulidis (yellow card) 63'; Huanderson (yellow card) 78'	Stadium: "Nikos Sarafis" Stadium; Referee: Nikos Poulimas (Corfu)

19 May 2013 40	Iraklis	3 – 1	Anagennisi Giannitsa	Thessaloniki
18:00 EEST	Isaac 11'; Stefanidis 12', 37'	Summary; Live TV:	Arce 24'	Stadium: Kaftanzoglio Stadium; Referee: Ioannis Blounas (Phthiotis)

22 May 2013 41	Olympiacos Volos	1 – 0	Iraklis	Volos
18:00 EEST	Kostoulas (yellow card) 36'; Bolatti (yellow card) 45+3'; Solakis 50'; Oliseh (yellow card) 60'	Summary; Live TV: OTE Sport	Savidis (yellow card) 3'; Ucar (yellow card) 28'; Taianan (yellow card) 30'; Ch. Paligiorgos (yellow card) 33'; Huanderson (yellow card) 80'; Kirovski (yellow card) 90'	Stadium: Panthessaliko Stadium; Referee: Ioannis Sosonis (Lamia)

26 May 2013 42	Iraklis	0 – 2	Panetolikos	Thessaloniki
18:00 EEST	Stefanidis (yellow card) 41'; Ucar (red card) 44'; G. Paligiorgos (yellow card) 66'	Summary; Live TV: OTE Sport	Darlas (yellow card) 15'; Camara 34', 90+2'; Silva Júnior (yellow card) 41'; Bellón (yellow card) 43'; Stefanakos (red card) 55'; Koutsospyros (yellow card) 69'; Ioannou (yellow card) 80'	Stadium: Kaftanzoglio Stadium; Referee: Spiros Selimos (Laconia)

=== Promotion play-offs ===
==== Matches ====
2 June 2013 1	Iraklis	0 – 1	Olympiacos Volos	Thessaloniki
20:00 EET	Kirovski (yellow card) 26'; Chionidis (yellow card) 80'	Summary; Live TV: OTE Sport	Paleologos (yellow card) 26'; Karras (yellow card) 33'; Yenga 45'	Stadium: Kaftanzoglio Stadium; Referee: Anastasios Papapetrou (Athens)

5 June 2013 2	Panetolikos	2 – 0	Iraklis	Agrinio
20:00 EET	Darlas (yellow card) 21'; Koutsospyros 41'; Melissas (yellow card) 71' (yellow-red card) 90+4'; Camara 90+3'	Summary; Live TV: OTE Sport	Ucar (yellow card) 19'; Stefanidis (yellow card) 34'; López (yellow card) 52'; Fernandes (yellow card) 71'	Stadium: Panetolikos Stadium; Referee: Angelos Evagelou (Athens)

9 June 2013 3	Niki Volos	0 – 1	Iraklis	Volos
20:00 EEST	Psianos (yellow card) 31'	Summary; Live TV: OTE Sport	Siatravanis 24'; Vagelopoulos (yellow card) 26'; Isaac (yellow card) 83'	Stadium: Panthessaliko Stadium; Referee: Nikolaos Anousos (Laconia)

12 June 2013 4	Olympiacos Volos	4 – 0	Iraklis	Volos
20:00 EEST	Solakis 17'; Kapetanos 35' (pen.); Gogolos (yellow card) 39' (yellow-red card) 90'; Breška 66', 82'	Summary; Live TV: OTE Sport	Papasterianos (yellow card) 28'; Huanderson (yellow card) 34'	Stadium: Panthessaliko Stadium; Referee: Konstantinos Kariofilis (Piraeus)

16 June 2013 5	Iraklis	2 – 1	Panetolikos	Thessaloniki
20:00 EEST	Sarafoglou (yellow card) 50'; Kirovski 67', 90+4', (yellow card) 68'; Papasterianos (yellow card) 74'; Savidis (yellow card) 90+1'	Summary; Live TV: OTE Sport	Sfakianakis 16'; Ioannou (red card) 27'; Šišić (yellow card) 36'; Bellón (yellow card) 85'; Silva Júnior (yellow card) 87'	Stadium: Kaftanzoglio Stadium; Referee: Georgios Foukakis (Heraklion)

19 June 2013 6	Iraklis	4 – 0	Niki Volos	Thessaloniki
20:00 EET	Kirovski 35', 59' (pen.); Ch. Paligiorgos 40'; Troiris (yellow card) 72'; Alexiou 90+2', (yellow card) 90+3'	Summary; Live TV: OTE Sport	Karakoutsis (yellow card) 57'	Stadium: Kaftanzoglio Stadium; Referee: Athanasios Tzilos (Larissa)

== Greek Cup ==
=== First round ===
24 October 2012	Proodeftiki	1 – 0	Iraklis	Korydallos
15:00 EEST	Giokas (yellow card) 3'; Lekas (yellow card) 19'; Kousouris (yellow card) 50'; Chortsas (yellow card) 69'; Kolios (yellow card) 82'; Epitropakis (yellow card) 85' (yellow-red card) 90+5'; Grivas 90+2'	Live TV: OTE Sport	Chionidis (yellow card) 3'; López (yellow card) 72'	Stadium: Proodeftiki Stadium; Referee: Georgios Chatzis (West Attica)

== Statistics ==
=== Appearances and goals ===
No.	Pos	Nat	Player	Total		Football League		Greek Cup	
No.	Pos	Nat	Player	Apps	Goals	Apps	Goals	Apps	Goals
1	GK	(Brazil) BRA	Huanderson	39	0	39+0	0	0+0	0
4	DF	(Greece) GRE	Nikolaos Savidis	34	1	32+2	1	0+0	0
5	DF	(Greece) GRE	Stefanos Kragiopoulos	1	0	1+0	0	0+0	0
6	DF	(Greece) GRE	Angelos Papasterianos	16	1	12+3	1	1+0	0
7	MF	(Greece) GRE	Akis Georgiou	32	1	21+10	1	1+0	0
9	FW	(Greece) GRE	Giorgos Chionidis	20	3	6+13	3	1+0	0
10	MF	(Greece) GRE	Alexandros Natsiopoulos	8	0	2+6	0	0+0	0
11	FW	(Greece) GRE	Nestoras Stefanidis	40	9	33+6	9	1+0	0
12	MF	(Greece) GRE	Savvas Siatravanis	22	4	14+8	4	0+0	0
13	GK	(Greece) GRE	Panagiotis Papadopoulos	1	0	1+0	0	0+0	0
14	MF	(Spain) ESP	Isaac Jové Rubí	37	6	22+14	6	1+0	0
16	DF	(Greece) GRE	Nikos Troiris	5	0	2+3	0	0+0	0
18	MF	(Greece) GRE	Alexandros Mavridis	0	0	0+0	0	0+0	0
20	MF	(Portugal) POR	Julien Fernandes de Sousa	36	1	31+4	1	1+0	0
22	DF	(Greece) GRE	Antonis Natsouras	22	1	18+4	1	0+0	0
23	MF	(Albania) ALB	Artan Thorja	2	0	2+0	0	0+0	0
25	DF	(Spain) ESP	Dani López	39	0	38+0	0	1+0	0
26	DF	(Greece) GRE	Christos Paligiorgos	25	1	24+1	1	0+0	0
28	MF	(Greece) GRE	Nikos Soulidis	33	1	30+3	1	0+0	0
29	DF	(Greece) GRE	Dimitrios Tserkezos	16	0	11+5	0	0+0	0
31	MF	(Greece) GRE	Charalambos Sarafoglou	11	1	5+6	1	0+0	0
32	MF	(Greece) GRE	German Datidis	9	0	3+6	0	0+0	0
33	GK	(Greece) GRE	Panagiotis Vosniadis	1	0	0+0	0	1+0	0
37	GK	(Greece) GRE	Georgios Papadopoulos	0	0	0+0	0	0+0	0
44	MF	(Greece) GRE	Alexandros Lavidas	0	0	0+0	0	0+0	0
47	DF	(Greece) GRE	Stavros Vagelopoulos	37	3	34+2	3	1+0	0
66	MF	(Greece) GRE	Giorgos Paligiorgos	32	0	29+2	0	0+1	0
69	MF	(France) FRA	Kendal Ucar	21	1	20+1	1	0+0	0
70	MF	(Spain) ESP	Tuni	5	1	0+5	1	0+0	0
87	MF	(Brazil) BRA	Taianan	17	4	15+2	4	0+0	0
92	FW	(Greece) GRE	Christos Alexiou	3	1	0+3	1	0+0	0
90	FW	(North Macedonia) MKD	Hristijan Kirovski	25	12	19+6	12	0+0	0
99	MF	(Greece) GRE	Paschalis Voutsias	12	1	5+7	1	0+0	0
Players who left the club in-season
3	DF	(Greece) GRE	Nikos Liolios	1	0	1+0	0	0+0	0
8	DF	(Greece) GRE	Charidimos Michos	10	0	8+1	0	1+0	0
17	FW	(Greece) GRE	Ioannis Raphael Moisidis	0	0	0+0	0	0+0	0
19	MF	(Greece) GRE	Kiriakos Kivrakidis	1	0	0+1	0	0+0	0
21	MF	(Greece) GRE	Manolis Liapakis	5	0	4+1	0	0+0	0
30	MF	(Guinea) GUI	Ibrahima Bangoura	10	1	5+4	1	0+1	0
40	GK	(Greece) GRE	Giannis Firinidis	6	0	6+0	0	0+0	0
77	FW	(Australia) AUS	Billy Konstantinidis	8	0	0+7	0	0+1	0
88	MF	(Serbia) SRB	Radovan Krivokapić	13	1	12+0	1	1+0	0
94	FW	(Greece) GRE	Kosmas Tsilianidis	0	0	0+0	0	0+0	0

Last updated: 19 June 2013
Source: Match reports in Competitive matches

=== Top scorers ===
Includes all competitive matches. The list is sorted by shirt number when total goals are equal.

R	No.	Pos	Nat	Name	Football League	Greek Cup	Total
1	90	FW	(North Macedonia)	Hristijan Kirovski	12	0	12
2	11	FW	(Greece)	Nestoras Stefanidis	9	0	9
3	14	MF	(Spain)	Isaac	6	0	6
4	12	MF	(Greece)	Savvas Siatravanis	4	0	4
=	87	MF	(Brazil)	Taianan	4	0	4
6	9	FW	(Greece)	Giorgos Chionidis	3	0	3
=	47	CB	(Greece)	Stavros Vagelopoulos	3	0	3
8	4	DF	(Greece)	Nikolaos Savidis	1	0	1
=	6	DF	(Greece)	Angelos Papasterianos	1	0	1
=	7	MF	(Greece)	Akis Georgiou	1	0	1
=	20	MF	(Portugal)	Julien Fernandes	1	0	1
=	22	DF	(Greece)	Antonis Natsouras	1	0	1
=	26	DF	(Greece)	Christos Paligiorgos	1	0	1
=	28	MF	(Greece)	Nikos Soulidis	1	0	1
=	30	MF	(Guinea)	Ibrahima Bangoura	1	0	1
=	31	MF	(Greece)	Charalambos Sarafoglou	1	0	1
=	69	MF	(France)	Kendal Ucar	1	0	1
=	70	MF	(Spain)	Tuni	1	0	1
=	88	MF	(Serbia)	Radovan Krivokapić	1	0	1
=	92	FW	(Greece)	Christos Alexiou	1	0	1
=	99	MF	(Greece)	Paschalis Voutsias	1	0	1
				Own Goals	1	0	1
				TOTAL	56	0	56

=== Top assists ===
Includes all competitive matches. The list is sorted by shirt number when total assists are equal.

R	No.	Pos	Nat	Name	Football League	Greek Cup	Total
1	7	MF	(Greece)	Akis Georgiou	4	0	4
=	28	MF	(Greece)	Nikos Soulidis	4	0	4
=	69	MF	(France)	Kendal Ucar	4	0	4
=	88	MF	(Serbia)	Radovan Krivokapić	4	0	4
5	12	MF	(Greece)	Savvas Siatravanis	3	0	3
=	87	MF	(Brazil)	Taianan	3	0	3
7	11	FW	(Greece)	Nestoras Stefanidis	2	0	2
=	25	DF	(Spain)	Dani López	2	0	2
=	90	FW	(North Macedonia)	Hristijan Kirovski	2	0	2
10	4	DF	(Greece)	Nikolaos Savidis	1	0	1
=	8	DF	(Greece)	Charidimos Michos	1	0	1
=	14	MF	(Spain)	Isaac	1	0	1
=	30	MF	(Guinea)	Ibrahima Bangoura	1	0	1
=	31	MF	(Greece)	Charalambos Sarafoglou	1	0	1
=	47	DF	(Greece)	Stavros Vagelopoulos	1	0	1
=	66	MF	(Greece)	Giorgos Paligiorgos	1	0	1
				TOTAL	35	0	35

=== Disciplinary record ===
Includes all competitive matches. The list is sorted by shirt number when total cards are equal.

R	No.	Pos	Nat	Name	Football League			Greek Cup			Total		
R	No.	Pos	Nat	Name	Booked	(yellow card) (yellow-red card)	Sent off (straight red)	Booked	(yellow card) (yellow-red card)	Sent off (straight red)	Booked	(yellow card) (yellow-red card)	Sent off (straight red)
1	66	MF	(Greece)	Giorgos Paligiorgos	8	1	0	0	0	0	8	1	0
2	6	DF	(Greece)	Angelos Papasterianos	7	1	0	0	0	0	7	1	0
=	11	FW	(Greece)	Nestoras Stefanidis	7	0	0	0	0	0	7	0	0
4	8	DF	(Greece)	Charidimos Michos	6	0	0	0	0	0	6	0	0
=	20	MF	(Portugal)	Julien Fernandes	6	0	0	0	0	0	6	0	0
=	25	DF	(Spain)	Dani López	5	0	0	1	0	0	6	0	0
7	9	FW	(Greece)	Giorgos Chionidis	4	0	0	1	0	0	5	0	0
=	47	DF	(Greece)	Stavros Vagelopoulos	5	0	0	0	0	0	5	0	0
9	4	DF	(Greece)	Nikolaos Savidis	4	0	0	0	0	0	4	0	0
10	1	GK	(Brazil)	Huanderson	3	0	0	0	0	0	3	0	0
=	7	MF	(Greece)	Akis Georgiou	3	0	0	0	0	0	3	0	0
=	14	MF	(Spain)	Isaac	3	0	0	0	0	0	3	0	0
=	28	MF	(Greece)	Nikos Soulidis	3	0	0	0	0	0	3	0	0
=	87	MF	(Brazil)	Taianan	3	0	0	0	0	0	3	0	0
=	88	MF	(Serbia)	Radovan Krivokapić	3	0	0	0	0	0	3	0	0
16	16	DF	(Greece)	Nikos Troiris	2	0	0	0	0	0	2	0	0
=	26	DF	(Greece)	Christos Paligiorgos	2	0	0	0	0	0	2	0	0
=	29	DF	(Greece)	Dimitrios Tserkezos	2	0	0	0	0	0	2	0	0
=	40	GK	(Greece)	Giannis Firinidis	2	0	0	0	0	0	2	0	0
=	90	FW	(North Macedonia)	Hristijan Kirovski	2	0	0	0	0	0	2	0	0
21	10	MF	(Greece)	Alexandros Natsiopoulos	1	0	0	0	0	0	1	0	0
=	19	MF	(Greece)	Kiriakos Kivrakidis	1	0	0	0	0	0	1	0	0
=	21	MF	(Greece)	Manolis Liapakis	1	0	0	0	0	0	1	0	0
=	22	DF	(Greece)	Antonis Natsouras	1	0	0	0	0	0	1	0	0
=	30	MF	(Guinea)	Ibrahima Bangoura	1	0	0	0	0	0	1	0	0
=	31	MF	(Greece)	Charalambos Sarafoglou	1	0	0	0	0	0	1	0	0
=	70	MF	(Spain)	Tuni	1	0	0	0	0	0	1	0	0
=	99	MF	(Greece)	Paschalis Voutsias	1	0	0	0	0	0	1	0	0
				TOTAL	87	2	0	2	0	0	89	2	0

== See also ==
- Iraklis F.C. (Thessaloniki)
- List of Iraklis Thessaloniki F.C. players
- List of Iraklis F.C. seasons
- G.S. Iraklis Thessaloniki
- G.S. Iraklis Thessaloniki (men's basketball)
- Iraklis B.C. in international competitions
- G.S. Iraklis Thessaloniki (women's basketball)
- Ivanofeio Sports Arena
- G.S. Iraklis Thessaloniki (men's volleyball)
- G.S. Iraklis Thessaloniki (women's volleyball)
- G.S. Iraklis Thessaloniki (water polo)
- G.S. Iraklis Thessaloniki (rugby)
