= Stefanos Kragiopoulos =

Greek footballer (born in 1990)

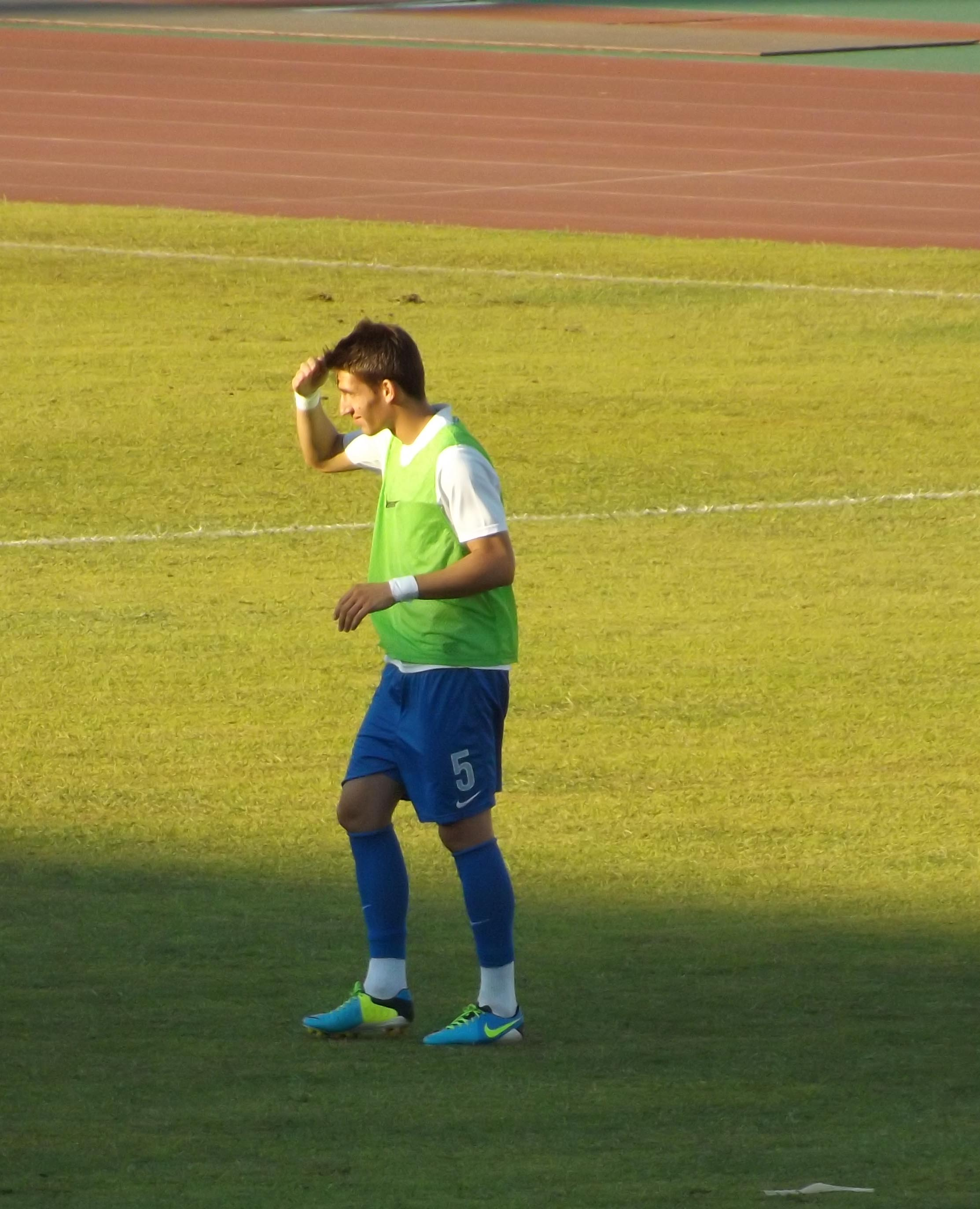
- Kragiopoulos warming up for Iraklis.

Personal information
- Full name: Stefanos Kragiopoulos
- Date of birth: 31 January 1990 (age 36)
- Place of birth: Katerini, Greece
- Height: 1.90 m (6 ft 3 in)
- Position: Centre back

Team information
- Current team: Pierikos

Youth career
- –2011: Pierikos

Senior career*
Years	Team	Apps	(Gls)
2011–2012	Pierikos	3	(0)
2011–2012	→ Vataniakos		
2012–2014	Iraklis	4	(0)
2014–2015	Iraklis Ambelokipi	0	(0)
2015–2017	Pierikos	0	(0)
2017–2018	Olympiacos Volos	0	(0)
2018	Niki Volos]	3	(0)
2018–	Pierikos	0	(0)
- * Club domestic league appearances and goals as of 20 July 2014

Stefanos Kragiopoulos (Greek: Στέφανος Κραγιόπουλος; born 31 January 1990) is a Greek footballer who plays for Pierikos in the Greek Football League 2 as a centre back. In the past he has played for Pierikos, Vataniakos and Iraklis.

== Club career ==
Kragiopoulos started his career with Pierikos. He debuted for the club in an away win against Diagoras. On 30 August 2013 he transferred to Greek Football League club Iraklis. He debuted for Iraklis in the last match of the 2012–13 season, a home win against Niki Volos. On 6 August Kragiopoulos signed for Iraklis Ambelokipi.

Few years later in January 2023 and after a very good career, Kragiopoulos returned to Pierikos signing a contract which expired on 30 June 2023. On 20 July 2023, the player extended his contract with the team which would expire on 30 June 2024.
