= Michailidou =

Michailidou (Greek: Μιχαηλίδου) is a Greek surname, and is the feminine form of Michailidis. Notable people with the surname include:

- Athena Michailidou (1918–2001), Greek actress
- Domna Michailidou (born 1987), Greek economist and politician
- Eftichia Michailidou (born 1977), Greek footballer
- Margarita Michailidou (born 1987), Greek taekwondo practitioner
