= Giannis Firinidis =

Greek footballer

Personal information
- Full name: Ioannis Firinidis
- Date of birth: July 1, 1983 (age 43)
- Place of birth: Katerini, Pieria, Greece
- Height: 1.83 m (6 ft 0 in)
- Position: Goalkeeper

Youth career
- 2003–2004: Aiginiakos

Senior career*
Years	Team	Apps	(Gls)
2004–2006	Agrotikos Asteras	12	(0)
2006–2008	Levadiakos	6	(0)
2008–2009	Anagennisi Arta	17	(1)
2009	Preveza	0	(0)
2009–2010	Pyrsos Grevena	19	(0)
2010–2011	Aetos Skydra	27	(0)
2011–2012	Anagennisi Epanomi	29	(0)
2012–2013	Iraklis	6	(0)
2013	AEL	3	(0)
2013–2014	Lamia	6	(0)
2014–2015	Kavala	0	(0)
2015–2016	Pierikos	0	(0)
2016–2018	Apollon Larissa	5	(0)
2018–2019	Ermis Aradippou	12	(0)
2019–2020	Thyella Sarakinon	0	(0)
2020–2022	Ermis Aradippou	11	(0)
2022	Thyella Sarakinon		
2022–2024	Vataniakos		
- * Club domestic league appearances and goals as of 23:50, 9 June 2021 (UTC).

Giannis Firinidis (Greek: Γιάννης Φιρινίδης; born 1 July 1983) is a Greek former professional footballer who played as a goalkeeper.

== Career ==
On 27 July 2019, it was confirmed that Firinidis had joined Thyella Sarakinon.
