= Paschalis Voutsias =

Greek footballer (born in 1990)

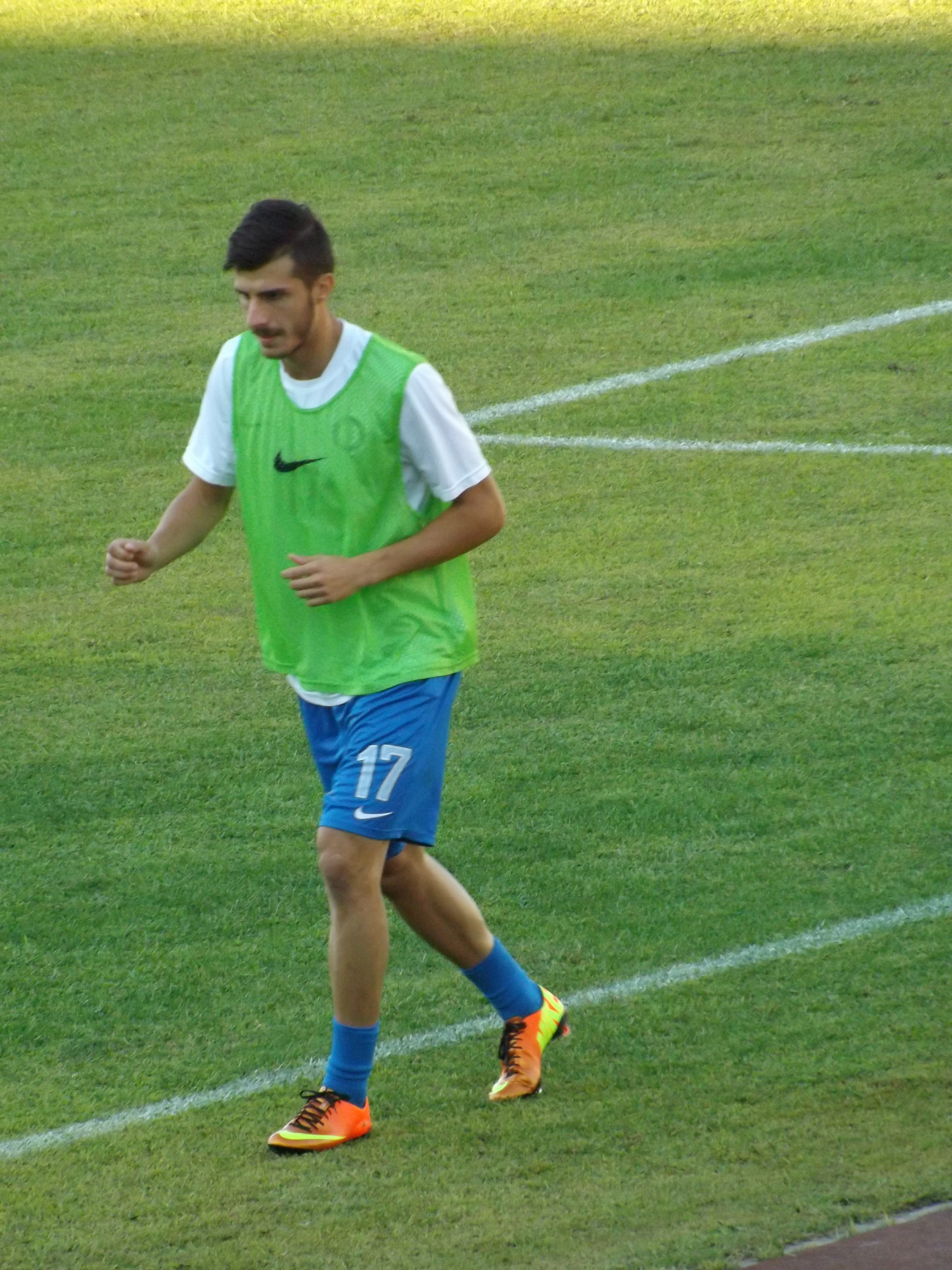
- Voutsias warming up for Iraklis

Personal information
- Full name: Paschalis Voutsias
- Date of birth: 23 March 1990 (age 36)
- Place of birth: Thessaloniki, Greece
- Height: 1.83 m (6 ft 0 in)
- Position: Forward

Team information
- Current team: Giannitsa

Youth career
- –2009: Iraklis

Senior career*
Years	Team	Apps	(Gls)
2009–2011	Iraklis	16	(1)
2011–2012	Panserraikos	19	(1)
2012–2014	Iraklis	14	(1)
2014–2015	Anagennisi Karditsa	8	(1)
2015–2017	Aris	0	(0)
2017	Agrotikos Asteras	17	(1)
2017	Apollon Larissa	6	(0)
2018	Langadas	0	(0)
2018–2019	Agrotikos Asteras	0	(0)
2019–	Giannitsa	0	(0)

International career
2009	Greece U19		
- * Club domestic league appearances and goals as of 29 December 2017

Paschalis Voutsias (Greek: Πασχάλης Βουτσιάς, born 23 March 1990) is a football midfielder, who plays for Giannitsa.

== Club career ==
=== Iraklis ===
Voutsias signed his first professional contract with Iraklis in the summer of 2009. He debuted for the club in a match against AEK Athens on 13 September 2010, coming in as a substitute for Javier Martos in the 70th minute of the game. Iraklis eventually lost the match 1–0. Voutsias will be remembered for his first goal with Iraklis' shirt. It was a header, in an away match against Skoda Xanthi, in the 2nd minute of the game. That was the 2000th goal for Iraklis in the Super League Greece. On 29 January 2014 Voutsias signed for Anagennisi Karditsa.

=== Aris ===
On 3 November Voutsias signed for Aris.

== Career statistics ==
As of match played 20 December 2017

Appearances and goals by club, season and competition
Club	Season	League			Greek Cup		Continental		Total	
Club	Season	Division	Apps	Goals	Apps	Goals	Apps	Goals	Apps	Goals
Iraklis	2009–10	Super League Greece	6	1	0	0	—		6	1
Iraklis	2010–11	Super League Greece	10	0	2	0	—		12	0
Iraklis	Total		16	1	2	0	0	0	18	1
Panserraikos	2011–12	Football League	19	1	2	0	—		21	1
Iraklis	2012–13	Football League	12	2	0	0	—		12	2
Iraklis	2013–14	Football League	2	0	0	0	—		2	0
Iraklis	Total		14	2	0	0	0	0	14	2
Vataniakos	2013–14	Football League	8	2	0	0	—		8	2
Anagennisi Karditsa	2014–15	Football League	29	4	2	0	—		31	4
Aris	2016–17	Football League	0	0	1	0	—		1	0
Agrotikos Asteras	2016–17	Football League	17	1	—		—		17	1
Apollon Larissa	2017–18	Football League	6	0	1	0	—		7	0
Career total			109	11	8	0	0	0	117	11
