= José Alberto =

José Alberto may refer to:

- José Alberto "El Canario" (born 1958), Dominican musician
- José Alberto (footballer) (born 1982), Spanish footballer
