= Athanasios Tolios =

Greek footballer (born in 1976)

Personal information
- Date of birth: 7 December 1976 (age 49)
- Place of birth: Aiginio, Greece
- Height: 1.91 m (6 ft 3 in)
- Position: Goalkeeper

Team information
- Current team: Aiginiakos

Senior career*
Years	Team	Apps	(Gls)
1996–1997	Edessaikos		
1997–2000	Veria		
2000–2003	Ethnikos Asteras		
2003–2005	Panserraikos		
2005–2007	PAS Giannina		
2007–2009	Pierikos		
2009–2011	Trikala		
2011–2012	Iraklis Psachna		
2012–2013	Pierikos		
2013	Iraklis Psachna		
2013–2018	Aiginiakos		
2018–2019	Niki Agkathia		
2019–2020	Anagennisi Giannitsa		
2020–2021	Anagennisi Kolindros		
2021	Thyella Sarakinon		
2021–2023	Anagennisi Kolindros		
2023–2026	Alexandreia		
2026	PAOK Dytiko		
2026–	Aiginiakos		
- * Club domestic league appearances and goals

Athanasios Tolios (Greek: Αθανάσιος Τόλιος; born 7 December 1976) is a Greek football goalkeeper.
