= Luis Oyarbide =

Uruguayan footballer (born 1986)

Personal information
- Full name: Luis Eduardo Oyarbide Miranda
- Date of birth: 1 September 1986 (age 40)
- Place of birth: Montevideo, Uruguay
- Height: 1.71 m (5 ft 7 in)
- Position: Midfielder

Senior career*
Years	Team	Apps	(Gls)
2006–2011	Nacional	12	(1)
2007–2008	→ Central Español (loan)	15	(3)
2010	→ Montevideo Wanderers (loan)	11	(3)
2010–2011	→ El Tanque Sisley (loan)	8	(0)
2012	Democrata	7	(2)
2012	Olympiacos Volos	13	(2)
2013	Iraklis Psachna	14	(0)
2013–2015	Cerrito	26	(11)
2015	Fuerza Amarilla		
2015–2016	Cerrito	11	(1)
2017–2018	Rocha F.C.		
- * Club domestic league appearances and goals

Luis Eduardo Oyarbide Miranda (born September 1, 1986) is a Uruguayan footballer who plays as a midfielder for Iraklis Psachna in Greece.

== Club career ==
Oyarbide started his career playing with the giant Club Nacional de Football in 2006. After his first season with the club, he was sent on a year-loan to Central Español in order to gain more continuity with the first team.

In January 2010, he moved to Montevideo Wanderers. He had a good season with the team playing 11 matches and scoring 3 goals.

In mid-2010, Oyarbide was transferred to El Tanque Sisley.

=== Democrata ===
In early 2012, he moved to Brazilian side Democrata. His outstanding performances couldn't help the club escape from relegation to Modul II, after finishing 11th in the overall table.

=== Olympiacos Volos ===
In summer 2012 he moved to Greek side Olympiacos Volos. On 21 October 2012, he scored his first goal against Panserraikos F.C. His second goal came on 11 November 2012 against Anagennisi Giannitsa F.C.

=== Iraklis Psachna ===
In January 2013, he signed a new contract with Football League side Iraklis Psachna. He made his debut with the club on 27 January 2013 against Panetolikos F.C.
