= Charalampos Sarafoglou =

Greek footballer

Charis Sarafoglou
Personal information
- Full name: Charalampos Sarafoglou
- Date of birth: 2 January 1993 (age 33)
- Place of birth: Greece
- Height: 1.84 m (6 ft 1/2 in)
- Position: Winger

Team information
- Current team: Thermaikos Thermis
- Number: 8

Youth career
- –2011: Iraklis

Senior career*
Years	Team	Apps	(Gls)
2011–2014	Iraklis	42	(4)
2014–2015	Iraklis Ambelokipi	30	(11)
2015–2016	APE lagkada	16	(8)
2016–2019	Thermaikos Thermis	50	(28)
- * Club domestic league appearances and goals as of 26 October 2014

Charalampos 'Charis' Sarafoglou (Greek: Χαράλαμπος 'Χάρης' Σαράφογλου; born 2 January 1993) is a Greek footballer who plays for Thermaikos Thermis in the Greek Football League 2 as a winger and offensive midfielder. He has also played for Iraklis in the first division Superleague and second division Football League.

== Career ==
Sarafoglou is a product of Iraklis' academies. Sarafoglou was a member of the squad of Iraklis, which took part in the regional championship of Delta Ethniki, after being expelled from the professional leagues. He made his first team debut in Iraklis' away draw against Nea Kallikrateia. He also captained the team during that season. He made his professional debut for Iraklis on 12 November 2012, in an away draw against Apollon Smyrnis in the 2012-13 season. His first goal for the club was a late equaliser against Panserraikos. On 6 August Sarafoglou signed for Iraklis Ambelokipi. He debuted for his new club on 21 September 2014, in an away match against Orfeas Elefteroupoli.
