= Michailidis =

Michailidis is a surname of Pontic Greek origin. Notable persons with that name include:

- Giannis Stergianos-Michailidis (born 1993), Greek football player
- Chrisostomos Michailidis, (born 1975), Greek football player
- Ieroklis Michailidis, (born 1960), Greek actor
- Zinon Michailidis, Greek sport shooter
- Vasilis Michailidis (1849–1917), Cypriot poet
