= Nestoras Stefanidis =

Greek footballer

Personal information
- Full name: Nestor Stefanidis
- Date of birth: 13 April 1984 (age 42)
- Place of birth: Kilkis, Greece
- Height: 1.83 m (6 ft 0 in)
- Position: Striker

Senior career*
Years	Team	Apps	(Gls)
2001–2003	Kilkisiakos	23	(3)
2004	Akratitos	0	(0)
2004–2005	Kilkisiakos	14	(4)
2005–2006	Polykastro	23	(2)
2006–2007	Kilkisiakos	1	(0)
2007–2009	Kastoria	45	(9)
2009–2011	Agrotikos Asteras	63	(14)
2011–2012	Panserraikos	26	(5)
2012–2013	Iraklis	39	(9)
2013–2014	AEL	32	(24)
2015	Agrotikos Asteras	17	(5)
2015–2016	Ethnikos Neo Agioneri	16	(4)
2016–2017	Langadas	8	(1)
2017–2018	Elpis Skoutari	1	(0)
2018	Langadas	2	(0)
2018–2019	Agrotikos Asteras	9	(1)
2019–2022	PAONE Eptalofou		
2022–2023	Kilkisiakos		
- * Club domestic league appearances and goals as of 12 January 2019

Nestoras Stefanidis (Greek: Νέστορας Στεφανίδης, born 13 April 1984) is a Greek former footballer who played as a centre forward.

== Club career ==
Stefanidis started his career in the club of his hometown Kilkisiakos. After a short spell for Akratitos he returned to Kilkisiakos. After playing for Kastoria and Agrotikos Asteras in July 2012 he signed for Iraklis. He debuted for his new club in the opening match of the season. He scored his first goal in an away win against Ergotelis on 20 October 2012. In August 2013 he moved to AEL. He played for almost 1.5 years and scored 22 goals in the Football League 2 championship, being a key player to the team's promotion in the second category. In January 2015 he signed once again with Agrotikos Asteras.
