= Dani López (footballer, born 1983) =

Spanish footballer

Personal information
- Full name: Daniel López Menéndez
- Date of birth: 7 October 1983 (age 43)
- Place of birth: Oviedo, Spain
- Height: 1.72 m (5 ft 8 in)
- Position: Left-back

Youth career
- 1994–2001: Oviedo

Senior career*
Years	Team	Apps	(Gls)
2001–2003	Oviedo B	55	(7)
2003–2004	Avilés	19	(0)
2004–2005	Oviedo ACF	29	(5)
2005–2006	Marino	37	(0)
2006–2008	Salamanca	72	(0)
2008–2010	Las Palmas	56	(0)
2010–2011	Numancia	22	(0)
2011–2012	Alavés	24	(1)
2012–2013	Iraklis	38	(0)
2013–2015	Avilés	76	(3)
2015–2016	Marino	29	(6)
2016–2019	Langreo	61	(4)
Total		518	(26)
- * Club domestic league appearances and goals

Daniel 'Dani' López Menéndez (born 7 October 1983) is a Spanish former footballer who played as a left-back, currently sporting director of Langreo.

== Playing career ==
Born in Oviedo, Asturias, López appeared in 150 Segunda División matches over five seasons. He represented in the competition Salamanca (two years), Las Palmas (two) and Numancia.

López retired in 2019 at the age of 35 after spending the later part of his career in the lower leagues and in his native region. He also played one year in the Greek Football League with Iraklis.

== Post-retirement ==
After retiring, López became his last club Langreo's director of football.

== Personal life ==
López's older brother, José Alberto, was involved in the sport as a manager, and spent most of his career with Sporting de Gijón.
