= Dimitrios Tserkezos =

Greek footballer (born in 1987)

Dimitris Tserkezos
Personal information
- Date of birth: 1 December 1987 (age 38)
- Place of birth: Drama, Greece
- Height: 1.76 m (5 ft 9 1/2 in)
- Position: Full-back

Youth career
- –2004: Doxa Drama

Senior career*
Years	Team	Apps	(Gls)
2004–2007	Doxa Drama	47	(1)
2007–2008	Panthrakikos	2	(0)
2008–2009	Kastoria	31	(0)
2009–2010	Ionikos	30	(0)
2010–2011	Niki Volos	13	(1)
2012–2013	Anagennisi Epanomi	13	(0)
2013–2014	Iraklis	16	(0)
2014	Apollon Kalamarias	9	(0)
2015–2016	Kissamikos	45	(2)
2017–2018	Panegialios	6	(0)
- * Club domestic league appearances and goals as of 4 December 2017

Dimitrios Tserkezos (Greek: Δημήτριος Τσερκέζος; born 1 December 1987) is a Greek footballer who last played for Panegialios in the Greek Football League. He started his career with Doxa Drama. He also had spells with Panthrakikos, Kastoria, Ionikos, Niki Volos, Anagennisi Epanomi and Iraklis.

== Career ==
Tserkezos started his career with his hometown's team Doxa Drama in 2004. He stayed with Doxa Drama for three seasons making a total of 47 appearances and scoring once. After leaving Doxa Drama in 2007 he had annual spells for Panthrakikos, Kastoria, Ionikos and Niki Volos. On 21 July 2012 he signed for Anagennisi Epanomi. After being released from Anagennisi Epanopi he signed a contract with Iraklis. He debuted for Iraklis in an away draw against AEL.
