= Nikos Troiris =

Greek footballer

Personal information
- Full name: Nikolaos Troiris
- Date of birth: 2 December 1986 (age 39)
- Place of birth: Litochoro, Greece
- Height: 1.78 m (5 ft 10 in)
- Position: Defensive midfielder

Youth career
- 2004–2006: Apollon Litochori

Senior career*
Years	Team	Apps	(Gls)
2006–2007	Pierikos	26	(0)
2007	Asteras Tripolis	1	(0)
2008	Ethnikos	4	(0)
2008	Pierikos	10	(0)
2009	Fostiras	12	(0)
2009–2010	Trikala	25	(0)
2010–2011	Pontioi Katerini	33	(2)
2011–2013	Iraklis	20	(0)
2013–2014	Panelefsiniakos	5	(0)
2014	Vataniakos		
2014–2015	Apollon Litochori		
2015–2016	Pierikos		
2016–2017	Poseidon Neon Poron		
2017–2021	AE Karitsas		
2021–2023	GAS Svoronos		
2023	Apollon Litochori		
- * Club domestic league appearances and goals as of 31 December 2025 11:14 UTC+2

Nikos Troiris (Greek: Νίκος Τροΐρης; born 2 December 1986) is a Greek former footballer who last played for B- EPS Pieiras side Apollon Litochori. He previously played in the Super League Greece for Asteras Tripolis.
