= Thanasis Dinopapas =

Greek professional footballer

Personal information
- Full name: Athanasios Dinopapas
- Date of birth: 24 November 1988 (age 37)
- Place of birth: Thessaloniki, Greece
- Height: 1.80 m (5 ft 11 in)
- Position: Forward

Team information
- Current team: Apollon Paralimnio

Youth career
- 2007: Achilleas Triandria

Senior career*
Years	Team	Apps	(Gls)
2008–2010	Agrotikos Asteras	51	(4)
2010–2011	Kerkyra	6	(0)
2011–2012	Anagennisi Epanomis	24	(5)
2012–2013	AEL	30	(5)
2013–2014	Olympiacos Volos	26	(4)
2014–2015	AEL	0	(0)
2015	Panelefsiniakos	0	(0)
2015–2016	Chania	27	(4)
2016–2017	Agrotikos Asteras	14	(4)
2017–2018	Sparti	8	(0)
2018–2019	Aittitos Spata	0	(0)
2019–2020	Olympiacos Volos	4	(0)
2020–2021	Karaiskakis	10	(1)
2021	Apollon Pontus	20	(6)
2022–	Apollon Paralimnio	0	(0)
- * Club domestic league appearances and goals as of 18 December 2021

Thanasis Dinopapas (Greek: Θανάσης Δεινόπαπας, born 24 November 1988) is a Greek professional footballer who plays as a forward for Apollon Paralimnio.

== Club career ==
Dinopapas started playing as an amateur for Achilleas Triandrias, a local team of Thessaloniki in 2007. After a year, he signed a professional contract for Football League team Agrotikos Asteras where he had two full and successful seasons with 51 appearances. This gave him the opportunity to play for Super League club Kerkyra. He played for Kerkyra six matches and in July 2011 he was transferred back to his hometown team Anagennisi Epanomi. There he had the most productive season of his career, scoring 5 goals in 24 games. On 19 June 2012, he signed a three-year contract with AEL. On 2 July 2013 due to financial problems, he was released by his team and is currently a free agent. On 13 September 2018, he joined Aittitos Spata on a free transfer.
