= Taianan =

Brazilian footballer

Personal information
- Full name: Taianan Imbere Linhares Welker
- Date of birth: 13 March 1987 (age 39)
- Place of birth: Passo Fundo, Brazil
- Height: 1.79 m (5 ft 10 1/2 in)
- Position: Midfielder

Youth career
- 1995–1999: Caixeiral (futsal)
- 1999–2006: Internacional
- 2007: Grêmio

Senior career*
Years	Team	Apps	(Gls)
2006	Senec	5	(0)
2007	CSKA Sofia	0	(0)
2008-2009	Maccabi Netanya	0	(0)
2009–2010	Espanyol B	1	(0)
2010–2011	Puertollano	10	(1)
2011	Paraná	9	(0)
2012	São José	7	(0)
2012	Grödig	14	(1)
2013–2014	Iraklis	36	(7)
2014	Napredak Kruševac	4	(0)
2015	Široki Brijeg	2	(0)
2016	Sampaio Corrêa	0	(0)
2016–2017	Agrotikos Asteras	23	(4)
2017	Gorodeya	7	(3)
2018–2020	Iraklis	17	(9)

International career^{‡}
2006	Brazil U20	9	(0)
- * Club domestic league appearances and goals as of 25 October 2020 ‡ National team caps and goals as of 25 October 2020

Taianan Imbere Linhares Welker (born 13 March 1987), commonly known as Taianan or Tai, is a Brazilian football agent and former footballer who last played for Iraklis. Taianan played for several clubs in Brazil and Europe.

== Career ==
Taianan started his professional career for FC Senec in 2006. He moved clubs almost annually playing for Maccabi Netanya, CSKA Sofia, Espanyol, CD Puertollano, Paraná Clube, Esporte Clube São José, Esporte Clube São José and SV Grödig. On 30 January 2013 Taianan signed for Greek Football League club Iraklis Thessaloniki. He made his debut for the club on 1 February 2013 in a match against Anagennisi Giannitsa. He scored his first goal for Iraklis a few weeks later, in an away win against Thrasyvoulos. After playing one season in Greece as Iraklis´s nº10, he was brought by coach Siniša Gogić, who coached him at Iraklis, to Serbian side FK Napredak Kruševac. After problems with injuries, he left club and returned in Brazil. During the winter transfer window of 2015 he transferred to Bosnia and Herzegovina Premier League outfit Široki Brijeg. (in Serbian)

In summer 2016, after a short spell in Brazil with Sampaio Corrêa, he returned to Greece and joined Agrotikos Asteras playing in the 2016–17 Greek Football League.

After breaking with Iraklis in February 2019, he returned to the club in October 2019 to help the club, that just had been demoted to the Gamma Amateur Championship for the 2019-20 season.

== National team ==
In 2006 Tai played with Brazil U-20.

== Career statistics ==
=== Club ===
As of 20 April 2020

Club	Season	League		Cup		Continental^{[A]}		Others^{[B]}		Total	
Club	Season	Apps	Goals	Apps	Goals	Apps	Goals	Apps	Goals	Apps	Goals
Senec	2006	5	0	0	0	-	-	-	-	5	0
Senec	Total	5	0	0	0	-	-	-	-	5	0
CSKA Sofia	2007	0	0	0	0	0	0	-	-	0	0
CSKA Sofia	Total	0	0	0	0	0	0	0	0	0	0
Maccabi Netanya	2008	0	0	0	0	0	0	-	-	0	0
Maccabi Netanya	2008-09	0	0	0	0	0	0	-	-	0	0
Maccabi Netanya	Total	0	0	0	0	0	0	0	0	0	0
Espanyol B	2009-10	1	0	-	-	-	-	-	-	1	0
Espanyol B	Total	1	0	-	-	-	-	-	-	1	0
Puertollano	2010	10	1	1	0	-	-	-	-	11	1
Puertollano	Total	10	1	1	0	-	-	-	-	11	1
Paraná	2011	0	0	0	0	-	-	9	0	9	0
Paraná	Total	0	0	0	0	-	-	9	0	9	0
São José	2012	0	0	0	0	-	-	7	0	7	0
São José	Total	0	0	0	0	-	-	7	0	7	0
Grödig	2012	14	1	1	0	-	-	-	-	15	1
Grödig	Total	14	1	1	0	-	-	-	-	15	1
Iraklis	2013	17	4	0	0	-	-	-	-	17	4
Iraklis	2013-14	19	3	2	0	-	-	-	-	22	3
Iraklis	Total	36	7	2	0	-	-	-	-	38	7
Napredak Kruševac	2014	4	0	0	0	-	-	-	-	4	0
Napredak Kruševac	Total	4	0	0	0	-	-	-	-	4	0
Široki Brijeg	2015	2	0	1	0	-	-	-	-	3	0
Široki Brijeg	Total	2	0	1	0	-	-	-	-	3	0
Sampaio Corrêa	2016	0	-	-	-	-	-	0	0	0	0
Sampaio Corrêa	Total	-	-	-	-	-	-	0	0	0	0
Agrotikos Asteras	2016-17	23	4	2	1	-	-	-	-	25	5
Agrotikos Asteras	Total	23	4	2	1	-	-	-	-	25	5
Gorodeya	2017	7	3	0	0	-	-	-	-	7	3
Gorodeya	Total	7	3	0	0	-	-	-	-	7	3
Iraklis	2018	10	6	-	-	-	-	-	-	10	6
Iraklis	2018-19	4	0	2	0	-	-	-	-	6	0
Iraklis	2019–20	3	3	-	-	-	-	-	-	3	3
Iraklis	Total	17	9	2	0	-	-	-	-	19	9
Iraklis total		53	16	4	0	-	-	-	-	57	16
Greece total		76	20	6	1	-	-	-	-	82	21
Europe total		119	25	9	1	-	-	-	-	128	26
Career total		119	25	9	1	-	-	16	0	144	26

== Honours ==
SV Grödig

- Austria First League: 2012–13

Iraklis

- Gamma Ethniki: 2017–18
- Macedonia FCA Fourth Division: 2019–20
