= Hristijan Kirovski =

Macedonian footballer

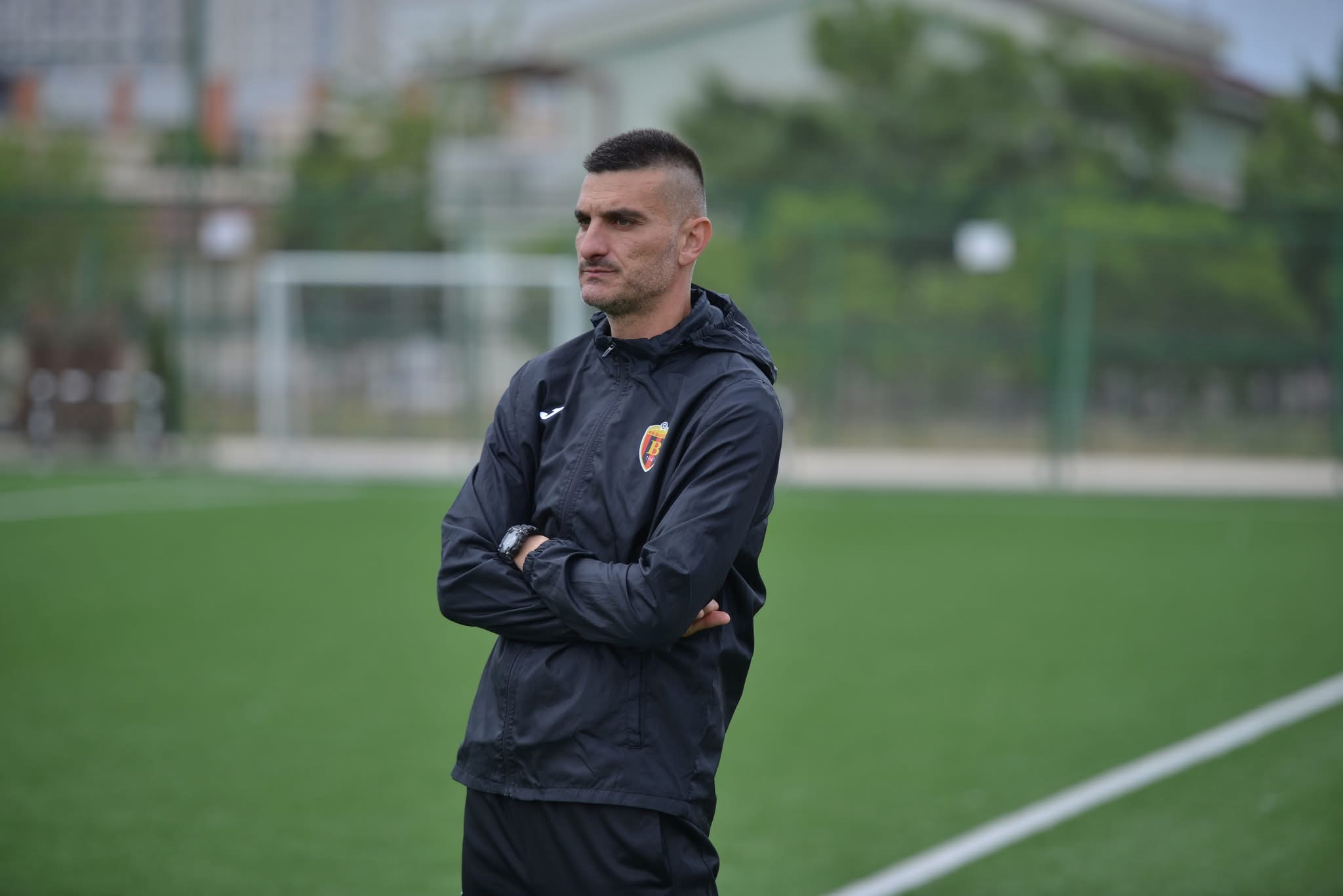
- Hristijan during a match for Vardar U-17 in May 2026

Personal information
- Full name: Hristijan Kirovski; Христијан Кировски
- Date of birth: 12 October 1985 (age 41)
- Place of birth: Skopje, SFR Yugoslavia
- Height: 1.91 m (6 ft 3 in)
- Position: Forward

Team information
- Current team: Vardar (assistant manager)

Senior career*
Years	Team	Apps	(Gls)
2001–2002	Vardar	7	(0)
2002–2006	OFK Beograd	33	(9)
2005	→ Metalurh Zaporizhzhia (loan)	6	(1)
2006	→ Makedonija (loan)	9	(2)
2006	Ethnikos Achna	11	(2)
2007	Vardar	18	(8)
2007–2008	Rabotnički	21	(10)
2009–2010	Vaslui	10	(2)
2010–2011	Skopje	30	(20)
2011–2012	Apollon Limassol	22	(7)
2012	Ironi Nir Ramat HaSharon	5	(1)
2013	Iraklis	25	(12)
2013	CSKA Sofia	9	(1)
2014	GKS Bełchatów	11	(2)
2014	GKS Bełchatów II	3	(0)
2014–2015	Shkëndija	47	(14)
2016	Prachuap	25	(17)
2017	Chiangmai	23	(11)
2018	Rabotnički	17	(5)
2018–2019	Makedonija	33	(11)
2019–2020	Struga	22	(5)
2020	Gostivar	14	(7)
2020–2022	Skopje	37	(14)
2023	Teteks	11	(8)
2023–2025	Skopje	33	(7)

International career
	Macedonia U17	2	(1)
	Macedonia U19	7	(4)
	Macedonia U21	7	(1)
2010	Macedonia	2	(0)

Managerial career
- 2024–2025: Skopje U19
- 2025: Tikves (assistant manager)
- 2025-2026: Vardar U17
- 2026-: Vardar (assistant manager)
- * Club domestic league appearances and goals as of 06 November 2025

Hristijan Kirovski (Macedonian: Христијан Кировски; born 12 October 1985) is a former Macedonian professional footballer who played as a forward and is the current first assistant coach of Vardar.

== Career ==
=== Club ===
Kirovski began playing football with local side FK Vardar. He joined OFK Belgrade for 3.5 years, spending the last six months on loan at Ukrainian Premier League side FC Metalurh Zaporizhya. After his contract with OFK was finished, Kirovski moved to Cyprus to join Ethnikos Achna FC for six months. He returned to Vardar, where he enjoyed success, scoring 11 goals in 10 matches. However at age 21, Ukrainian Premier League side FC Karpaty Lviv acquired Kirovski in August 2007. In January 2013 Kirovski signed for Greek Football League club Iraklis. He joined Bulgarian club CSKA Sofia in mid July 2013, signing a two-year contract with the team. He had difficulties establishing himself as the first choice for his position and eventually relocated to Poland, signing with GKS Bełchatów.

On 24 June 2019 it was confirmed, that Kirovski had joined FC Struga.

==== International career ====
He made his senior debut for Macedonia in a November 2010 friendly match against Albania and has earned a total of 2 caps, scoring no goals. His second and final international was a December 2010 friendly against China.

=== Career statistics ===
Club	Season	League		Cup		Continental		Total	
Club	Season	Apps	Goals	Apps	Goals	Apps	Goals	Apps	Goals
Vaslui	2008–09	10	2	2	0	–	–	12	2
Vaslui	2009–10	0	0	1	0	–	–	1	0
Total		12	2	3	0	0	0	13	2
Skopje	2010–11	20	11	0	0	–	–	20	11
Total		20	11	0	0	0	0	20	11
Apollon	2011–12	21	6	0	0	–	–	21	6
Total		21	6	0	0	0	0	21	6
Ironi	2012–13	5	1	0	0	–	–	5	1
Total		5	1	0	0	0	0	5	1
Iraklis	2012–13	25	12	0	0	–	–	25	12
Total		25	12	0	0	0	0	25	12
Career total		83	32	3	0	0	0	86	32

Macedonian Cup with FK Vardar for players under 17.

== Managerial career ==
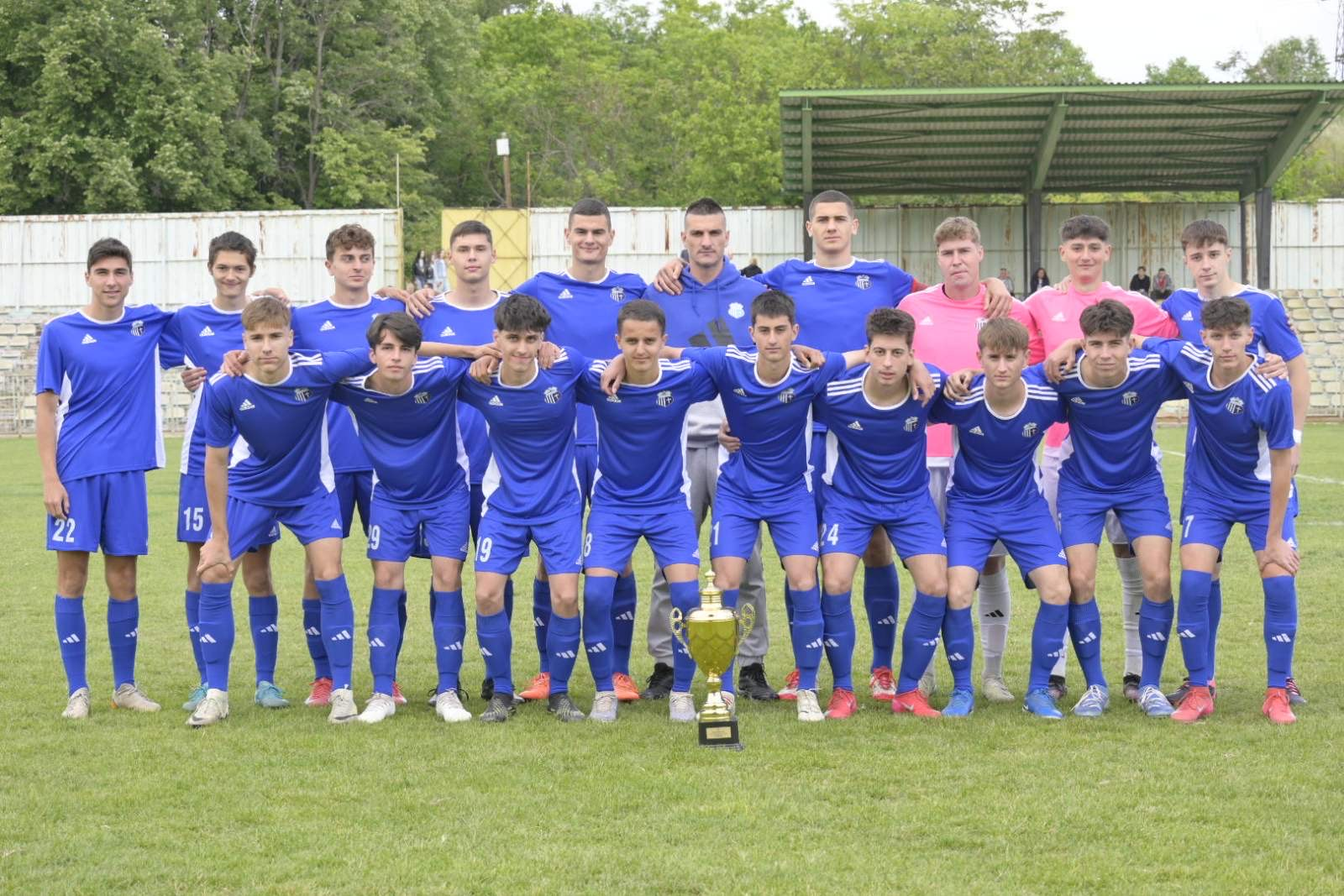
The youth team of FC Skopje as champions in the 2024/25 season

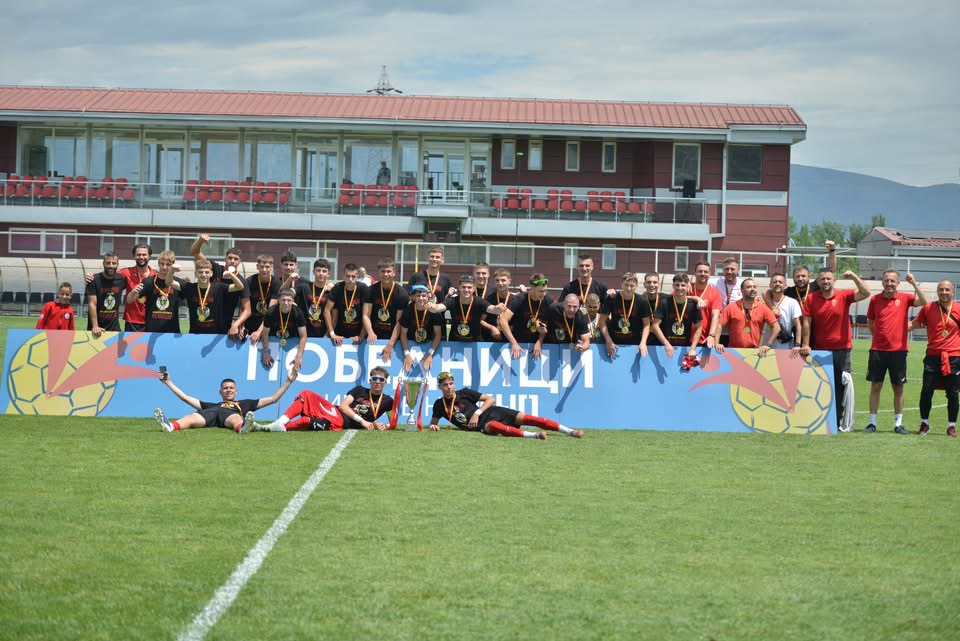
Hristijan with the U-17 Vardar team, winners of the 2025 - 26 national cup

Kirovski began his coaching career in 2024, serving as the head of the youth team of Skopje - U19 in the second youth league for players under 19 years of age with which he achieved great success, winning first place in the 2024/2025 season. Since July 2025, he has been appointed as an assistant at Tikveš in the first Macedonian football league. In November 2025, he took over the Vardar U-17 team, and won the national cup for the 2025–2026 season.

From August 1, 2026, he was named first assistant coach of FC Vardar.

== Honours ==
=== Player ===
Makedonija

- Macedonian Cup: 2005–06

Vardar

- Macedonian Cup: 2006–07

Rabotnički

- Macedonian First Football League: 2007–08

GKS Bełchatów

- I liga: 2013–14

Individual

- Macedonian First Football League top scorer: 2010–11

=== Manager ===
- Youth champion with FK Skopje for players under 19 in the 2024–2025 season.
- Macedonian Cup Winner with FK Vardar for players under 17.
