= Thanasis Paleologos =

Greek footballer

Personal information
- Full name: Athanasios Paleologos
- Date of birth: 14 July 1977 (age 49)
- Place of birth: Chalcis, Greece
- Height: 1.90 m (6 ft 3 in)
- Position: Defender

Team information
- Current team: Iraklis Psachna

Youth career
- Iraklis Psachna

Senior career*
Years	Team	Apps	(Gls)
2001–2005	AEL	77	(9)
2006	Veria	10	(1)
2006–2008	Ethnikos Asteras	40	(2)
2008–2012	Panetolikos	84	(2)
2012–2013	Olympiacos Volos	30	(2)
2013–	Iraklis Psachna		
- * Club domestic league appearances and goals

Thanasis Paleologos (Greek: Θανάσης Παλαιολόγος; born 14 July 1977) is a Greek professional football defender who plays for Iraklis Psachna in the Football League (Greece).

== Career ==
Born in Chalcis, Paleologos began playing football with Iraklis Psachna F.C. in the regional league. He signed a professional contract with AEL in 2001.
