= Grigoris Pitsokos =

Greek footballer

Personal information
- Date of birth: 9 August 1989 (age 37)
- Place of birth: Thessaloniki, Greece
- Height: 1.72 m (5 ft 7 1/2 in)
- Position: Midfielder

Team information
- Current team: Iraklis

Senior career*
Years	Team	Apps	(Gls)
2008–2011	Iraklis		
2009	→ Thermaikos (loan)	8	(1)
2009–2010	→ Panargiakos (loan)	7	(0)
2010	→ Epanomi (loan)	12	(1)
2011	→ Platanias (loan)	11	(0)
2011–2012	Doxa Drama	4	(0)
2012–	Iraklis		
- * Club domestic league appearances and goals as of 4 February 2012

Grigoris Pitsokos (Greek: Γρηγόρης Πιτσόκος, born 9 August 1989) is a professional Greek football player currently playing for Iraklis in the Football League 2 (Greece).

He played the majority of his career in Gamma Ethniki clubs, on loan from Iraklis. On 11 July 2011, he joined Doxa Drama, and was released on 23 December of the same year as a Free agent

On 4 January 2012, Pitsokos rejoined Iraklis.
