= Georgios Chionidis =

Greek footballer (born 1991)

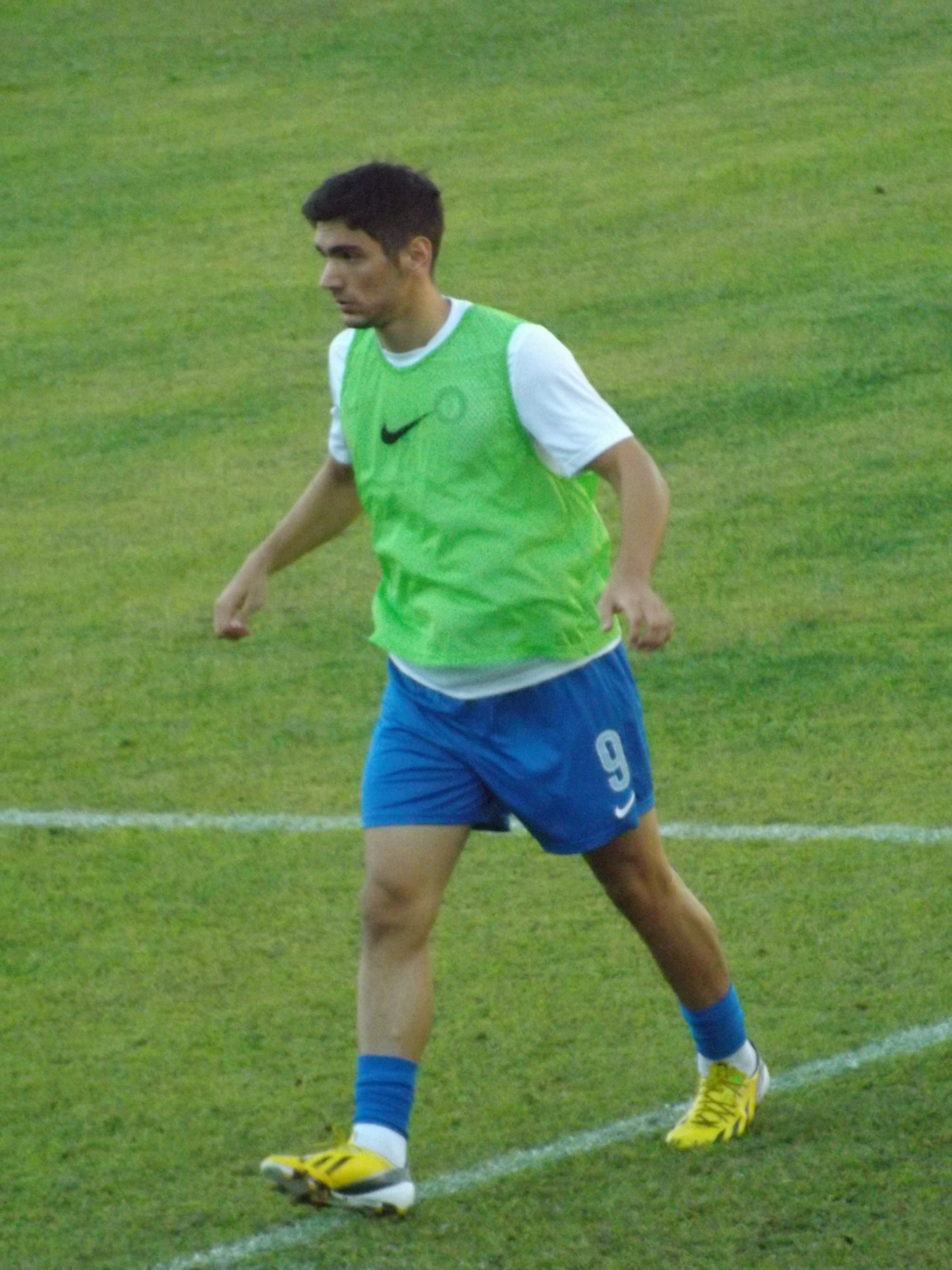

Personal information
- Full name: Georgios Chionidis
- Date of birth: 25 June 1991 (age 35)
- Place of birth: Katerini, Greece
- Height: 1.83 m (6 ft 0 in)
- Position: Striker

Youth career
- –2009: Pontioi Katerinis
- 2009–2010: Panathinaikos

Senior career*
Years	Team	Apps	(Gls)
2010–2011	Ionikos	7	(1)
2011–2012	Pontioi Katerinis	5	(0)
2012–2014	Iraklis	47	(6)
- * Club domestic league appearances and goals as of 30 May 2014

Georgios Chionidis (Greek: Γεώργιος Χιονίδης; born 25 June 1991) is a Greek footballer who plays as a striker. Previously he had played professional football for Ionikos, Pontioi Katerinis and Iraklis.

== Club career ==
Chionidis was raised in Pontioi Katerinis academy. In 2009, he moved to Panathinaikos' academies. In 2010, he signed a professional contract with Ionikos. He debuted for the club in a home win against Thrasyvoulos and scored his first goal in an away defeat against Doxa Drama. In 2011, he signed for Pontioi Katerinis. After the club's merger with Iraklis he moved to the new club's squad and debuted for Iraklis in an away draw against Doxa Kranoula. His first goal was an injury time equaliser in an away match against Niki Volos.

== Personal ==
Chionidis is the son of Katerini's mayor, Savvas Chionidis.
