= Kendal Ucar =

French-born Turkish footballer (born 1981)

Personal information
- Full name: Kendal Ucar
- Date of birth: 3 September 1981 (age 45)
- Place of birth: Montbéliard, France
- Height: 1.72 m (5 ft 7 1/2 in)
- Position: Attacking midfielder

Senior career*
Years	Team	Apps	(Gls)
1999–2002	Sochaux	2	(0)
2002–2003	Ionikos	21	(0)
2003–2004	Delémont		
2004–2005	Valence	5	(0)
2005–2009	Ionikos	62	(3)
2009–2010	Ethnikos Asteras	37	(5)
2010–2012	OFI	18	(2)
2012–2013	Platanias	15	(1)
2013	Iraklis	21	(1)
- * Club domestic league appearances and goals as of 2 September 2013 (UTC)

Kendal Ucar (born 3 September 1981) is a Turkish French-born footballer.

Ucar began his professional career with FC Sochaux-Montbéliard, but he would only make two appearances for the club in Ligue 2. (Note: Kendal Ucar – French league stats at LFP – also available in French (archived)) He moved to Ionikos F.C. in July 2002, where he would play six seasons in the Super League Greece, playing in over 150 games and scoring over 20 goals. Kendal Ucar is now retired and living in Los Angeles, CA, USA, where he continues to play and coach soccer.
