= Charidimos Michos =

Greek footballer (born in 1981)

Personal information
- Date of birth: 15 March 1981 (age 45)
- Place of birth: Drama, Greece
- Height: 1.76 m (5 ft 9 1/2 in)
- Positions: Fullback; defender

Team information
- Current team: Anagennisi Karditsa

Senior career*
Years	Team	Apps	(Gls)
2000–2001	Patraikos	1	(0)
2001	Panegialios	11	(0)
2001–2004	Patraikos	57	(0)
2004–2005	Panachaiki	16	(2)
2005–2006	Ergotelis	11	(0)
2006–2007	Asteras Tripolis	17	(0)
2007–2010	Thrasyvoulos	70	(3)
2010–2012	Kerkyra	19	(0)
2012–2013	Iraklis	9	(0)
2013–	Anagennisi Karditsa	0	(0)
- * Club domestic league appearances and goals as of 14 January 2013

Charidimos Michos (Greek: Χαρίδημος Μίχος, born 15 March 1981) is a Greek professional football defender, currently playing for Anagennisi Karditsa. He has also played for Patraikos, Panegialios, Panachaiki, Ergotelis, Asteras Tripolis, Thrasyvoulos (for which he made 70 appearances) and Kerkyra.
