= Radovan Krivokapić =

Serbian footballer

Personal information
- Full name: Radovan Krivokapić
- Date of birth: 14 August 1978 (age 48)
- Place of birth: Bačka Topola, SFR Yugoslavia
- Height: 1.81 m (5 ft 11 1/2 in)
- Position: Attacking midfielder

Youth career
- 1994–1996: Njegoš Lovćenac

Senior career*
Years	Team	Apps	(Gls)
1996–2002	Vojvodina	87	(16)
1997–1998	→ Bečej (loan)	24	(3)
2002–2007	Red Star Belgrade	87	(11)
2007	→ Vojvodina (loan)	9	(1)
2007–2009	Veria	49	(4)
2009–2012	EN Paralimni	86	(14)
2012–2013	Iraklis	12	(1)
2013	EN Paralimni	11	(1)
2013–2014	Radnički Kragujevac	24	(1)
2014–2015	TSC	17	(1)
Total		406	(53)

International career
1996–1997	FR Yugoslavia U18	6	(0)
1999	FR Yugoslavia U21	2	(0)
2001–2002	FR Yugoslavia	4	(0)

Managerial career
- 2015–2017: TSC
- 2018: Cement Beočin
- 2018: Vojvodina (assistant)
- 2018–2019: Vojvodina
- 2021–2023: Serbia U17
- 2023–: Serbia U19
- * Club domestic league appearances and goals

Radovan Krivokapić (Serbian Cyrillic: Радован Кривокапић; born 14 August 1978) is a Serbian retired footballer who played as an attacking midfielder.

== Playing career ==
Krivokapić made his debut for FR Yugoslavia in a June 2001 Kirin Cup match against Paraguay, coming on as a 28th-minute substitute for captain Dragan Stojković, and earned a total of 4 caps (no goals). His final international was a March 2002 friendly match away against Brazil.

== Managerial statistics ==
As of match played 29 May 2022

Managerial record by team and tenure
Team	From	To	Record								Ref.
Team	From	To	P	W	D	L	GF	GA	GD	Win %	Ref.
Cement Beočin	14 April 2018	10 September 2018	14	5	3	6	16	17	−1	35.7	
Vojvodina	26 November 2018	25 June 2019	21	4	7	10	14	31	−17	19.0	
Serbia U17	13 April 2021	present	13	7	4	2	33	16	+17	53.8	
Total			48	16	14	18	63	64	−1	33.3	—

== Honours ==
Red Star Belgrade

- First League of Serbia and Montenegro: 2003–04, 2005–06
- Serbia and Montenegro Cup: 2003–04, 2005–06
