= Vanger =

Brazilian footballer

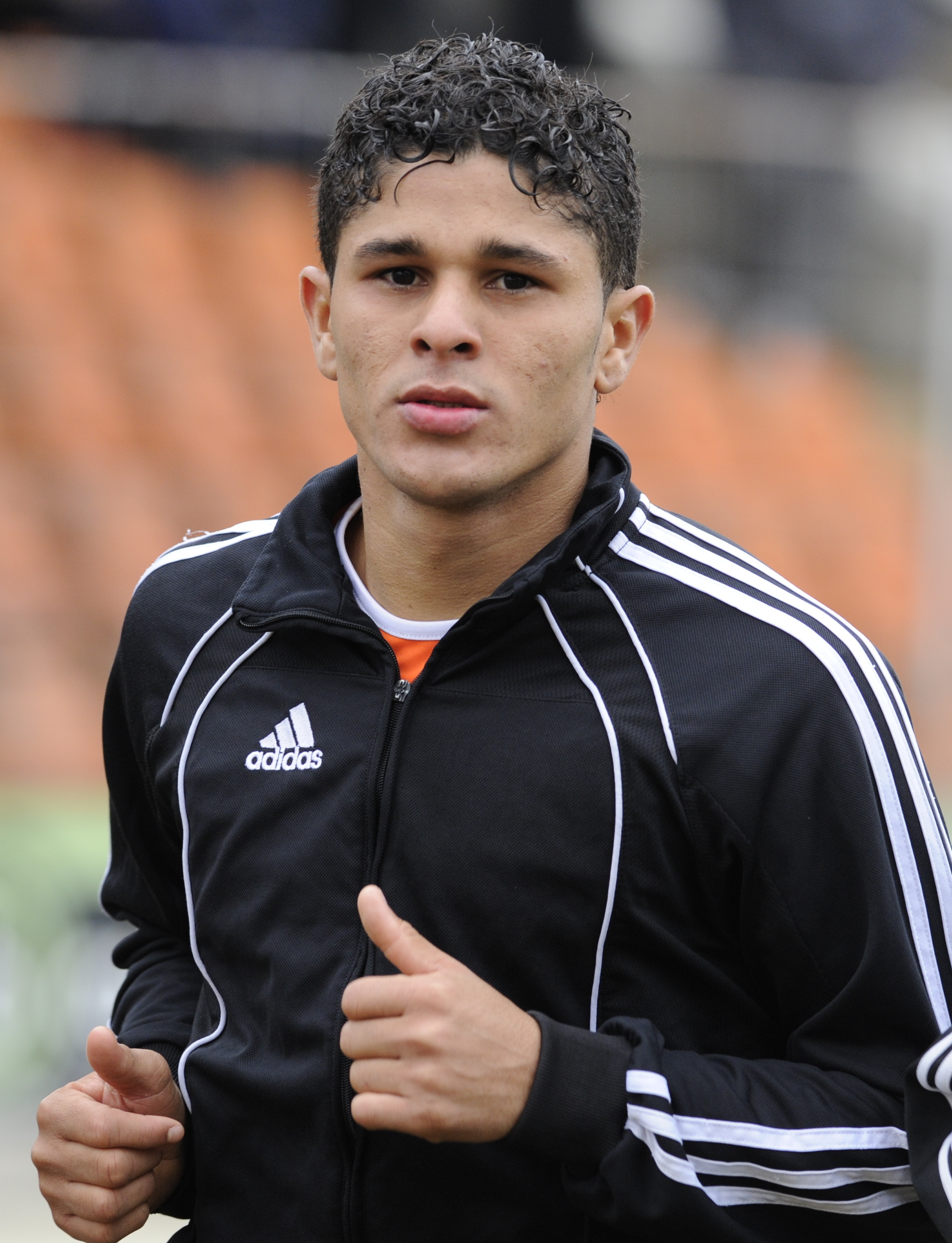

Personal information
- Full name: Vanger Conceição da Silva
- Date of birth: 27 January 1987 (age 39)
- Place of birth: São Luís, Brazil
- Height: 1.70 m (5 ft 7 in)
- Positions: Winger; attacking midfielder

Senior career*
Years	Team	Apps	(Gls)
2004–2009	CA Fénix	25	(6)
2009–2010	C.S. Visé	17	(6)
2011	Alecrim FC		
2012	Horizonte FC	19	(7)
2012	Boa Esporte	34	(6)
2013	Litex Lovech	19	(4)
2014	Tombense	10	(0)
2014	Icasa	7	(0)
2015	São Bernardo	14	(0)
2015	Tombense	1	(0)
2015	Sampaio Corrêa	11	(0)
2016	Cuiabá	7	(1)
2016	Campinense	1	(0)
2017	Uberlândia	4	(0)
2017	CSA	15	(2)
2018	Globo FC	9	(0)
2019	Tupynambás	4	(0)
2019	Treze		
2020	Tupynambás	5	(0)
2020–2021	Tarxien Rainbows	12	(3)
2021	Gudja United	7	(0)
- * Club domestic league appearances and goals

Vanger Conceição da Silva (born 27 January 1987), or simply Vanger, is a Brazilian former professional footballer who plays as a winger or attacking midfielder.

== Career ==
Vanger was born in São Luís. He began his professional career with Centro Atlético Fénix in Uruguay, before joined Belgian club Visé in 2009.

In January 2012, Vanger joined Horizonte Futebol Clube. For four months he earned 19 appearances in the Campeonato Cearense, scored 7 goals.

In May 2012, Vanger signed for Campeonato Brasileiro Série B side Boa Esporte Clube. He made his debut in a 2–2 draw against Avaí on 19 May, playing the full 90 minutes. On 24 June, Vanger scored his first goal in a 4–1 win over Grêmio Barueri at Melão. He ended the season with 6 goals in 34 league games.

On 8 January 2013, it was officially announced that Vanger had signed a contract with Litex Lovech in Bulgaria.

== Career statistics ==
As of 24 August 2019

Appearances and goals by club, season and competition
Club	Season	League			Cup		State League		Continental		Total	
Club	Season	Division	Apps	Goals	Apps	Goals	Apps	Goals	Apps	Goals	Apps	Goals
CA Fénix	2005	Uruguayan Primera División	13	4	0	0	—		—		13	4
CA Fénix	2005–06	Uruguayan Primera División	5	0	0	0	—		—		5	0
CA Fénix	2006–07	Uruguayan Segunda División	7	2	0	0	—		—		7	2
CA Fénix	2007–08	Uruguayan Primera División	0	0	0	0	—		—		0	0
Visé	2009–10	Belgian Third Division	17	6	0	0	—		—		17	6
Horizonte FC	2012	Campeonato Cearense	—		3	0	19	7	—		22	7
Boa Esporte	2012	Série B	34	6	—		—		—		34	6
Litex Lovech	2012–13	A Group	14	3	2	0	—		—		16	3
Litex Lovech	2013–14	A Group	5	1	4	1	—		—		9	2
Tombense	2014	Campeonato Mineiro	—		1	0	10	0	—		11	0
Icasa	2014	Série B	7	0	—		—		—		7	0
São Bernardo	2015	Campeonato Paulista	—		6	0	14	0	—		20	0
Tombense	2015	Série C	1	0	—		—		—		1	0
Sampaio Corrêa	2015	Série B	11	0	—		—		—		11	0
Cuiabá	2016	Série C	7	1	4	1	—		—		11	2
Campinense	2016	Série D	1	0	—		—		—		1	0
Uberlândia	2017	Campeonato Mineiro	—		—		4	0	—		4	0
CSA	2017	Série C	8	2	2	0	7	0	—		17	2
Globo FC	2018	Série C	9	0	2	0	4	0	—		15	0
Tupynambás	2019	Campeonato Mineiro	—		—		4	0	—		4	0
Treze	2019	Série C	11	1	—		5	2	—		16	3
Career total			150	26	24	2	67	9	0	0	241	37
