= Nikolaos Savvidis =

Greek footballer

Personal information
- Full name: Nikolaos Savvidis
- Date of birth: 20 July 1992 (age 34)
- Place of birth: Serres, Greece
- Height: 1.87 m (6 ft 1 1/2 in)
- Position: Centre back

Senior career*
Years	Team	Apps	(Gls)
2009–2010	Ethnikos Katerini	0	(0)
2010–2011	Panserraikos	0	(0)
2011	Pontioi Katerini	6	(0)
2012–2014	Iraklis	65	(2)
- * Club domestic league appearances and goals as of 26 July 2014

Nikolaos Savvidis (Greek: Νικόλαος Σαββίδης; born 20 July 1992) is a Greek former professional footballer who played as a defender.

== Club career ==
Savvidis started is professional career with Ethnikos Katerini. In 2010, he was transferred to his hometown's club Panserraikos failing to make any appearances in the 2010-2011 season. In 2011, he was transferred to Pontioi Katerini. After the club's merger with Iraklis, Savidis was entered in the merged club's squad and he made his debut for Iraklis in an away draw against Doxa Kranoula.
