= Manolis Liapakis =

Greek footballer

Personal information
- Date of birth: 11 June 1984 (age 42)
- Place of birth: Ioannina, Greece
- Height: 1.84 m (6 ft 1/2 in)
- Positions: Defensive midfielder; centre back

Team information
- Current team: Doxa Drama
- Number: 56

Senior career*
Years	Team	Apps	(Gls)
2003–2004	Panachaiki	7	(0)
2003–2006	Egaleo	23	(0)
2006–2007	PAS Giannina	9	(0)
2007–2009	Thrasyvoulos	51	(0)
2009	Skoda Xanthi	1	(0)
2009–2010	Olympiacos Volos	14	(2)
2010–2011	OFI	10	(0)
2011–2012	Panthrakikos	7	(1)
2012–2013	Iraklis	5	(0)
2013	AEL	12	(0)
2013–	Doxa Drama	0	(0)

International career
2005	Greece U21	11	(0)
- * Club domestic league appearances and goals as of 8 July 2013

Manolis Liapakis (Greek: Μανώλης Λιαπάκης; born 11 June 1984) is a Greek footballer who currently plays for Doxa Drama.
