= Antonis Natsouras =

Greek footballer

Personal information
- Full name: Antonios Natsouras
- Date of birth: 18 December 1979 (age 46)
- Place of birth: Meliki, Imathia, Greece
- Height: 1.84 m (6 ft 1/2 in)
- Position: Midfielder

Senior career*
Years	Team	Apps	(Gls)
–1997	Phillipas Meliki		
1997–2001	Veria	65	(3)
2001–2004	Iraklis	49	(0)
2004–2005	Ionikos	11	(1)
2005	Torino	0	(0)
2005	Chievo	0	(0)
2006	Cremonese	2	(0)
2006–2008	Ionikos	39	(3)
2008–2009	Kallithea	29	(0)
2009–2010	OFI	34	(2)
2010–2011	Panthrakikos	27	(0)
2012–2013	Iraklis	33	(2)
2013–2014	Glyfada		
2014	Doxa Drama		
- * Club domestic league appearances and goals as of 2 September 2013

Antonis Natsouras (Greek: Αντώνης Νατσούρας; born 18 December 1979) is a Greek former professional footballer.

== Career ==
Born in Meliki, Imathia, Natsouras began playing football for local side Phillipas Meliki. He joined Alpha Ethniki side Veria F.C. in 1997. Veria was relegated twice during his time with the club. He returned to the Alpha Ethniki with Iraklis in 2001.

Natsouras had a brief spell with Ionikos F.C. before moving to Italy. He initially joined Torino F.C., but after failing to settle signed a two-year contract with A.C. ChievoVerona in August 2005.

In January 2012, Natsouras signed for Iraklis.
