= Julien Fernandes =

Portuguese footballer (born in 1985)

Personal information
- Full name: Julien Fernandes de Sousa Almeida
- Date of birth: 16 March 1985 (age 41)
- Place of birth: Montluçon, France
- Height: 1.82 m (6 ft 0 in)
- Position: Defensive midfielder

Youth career
- Troyes

Senior career*
Years	Team	Apps	(Gls)
2004–2005	Troyes		
2005–2006	Vitória Setúbal B	26	(0)
2006–2007	Vitória Setúbal	15	(1)
2007–2008	Montañeros	21	(0)
2008–2009	Ciudad Santiago	32	(1)
2009–2010	Montañeros	34	(0)
2010–2012	Cartagena	33	(0)
2012–2013	Iraklis	35	(0)
2013	Aiginiakos	8	(0)
2014–2015	Enosis Neon	8	(0)
2015–2016	Jumilla	20	(1)
2016	Guadalajara	9	(0)
2016–2017	Eldense	12	(0)
2017–2019	Ayia Napa	33	(1)
2020	Guijuelo	3	(0)

International career
2006	Portugal U21	1	(0)
- * Club domestic league appearances and goals as of 15:42, 22 December 2020 (UTC)

Julien Fernandes de Sousa Almeida (born 16 March 1985 in Montluçon, Auvergne), known as Sousa, is a Portuguese professional footballer who plays as a defensive midfielder.
