= Christos Kelpekis =

Greek footballer

Christos Kelpekis Χρήστος Κελπέκης
Personal information
- Full name: Christos Stavros Kelpekis
- Date of birth: 17 March 1972 (age 54)
- Place of birth: Chalastra, Greece
- Height: 1.92 m (6 ft 4 in)
- Position: Goalkeeper

Senior career*
Years	Team	Apps	(Gls)
–1992	Kampaniakos		
1992–1995	Veria		
1995–2001	Kalamata		
2001–2005	Iraklis		
2006–2008	Apollon Kalamarias		
2008–2009	Veria		
2009–2010	Makedonikos		
2010–2011	Anagennisi Giannitsa		
2011–2012	A.E. Pontion Katerini		
2012	Iraklis		
2012–2013	Kampaniakos		

Managerial career
- 2016–2017: PAOK (goalk. coach)
- 2018–2020: Maccabi Tel Aviv (goalk. coach)
- 2020: Watford (goalk. coach)
- 2022: Maccabi Tel Aviv (goalk. coach)
- 2023–2024: Krasnodar (goalk. coach)
- * Club domestic league appearances and goals

Christos Kelpekis (Greek: Χρήστος Κελπέκης; born 22 August 1973) is a Greek football coach and a former football goalkeeper. He was most recently the goalkeepers' coach with the Russian club Krasnodar.
