= José Alberto (footballer) =

Spanish football manager (born 1982)

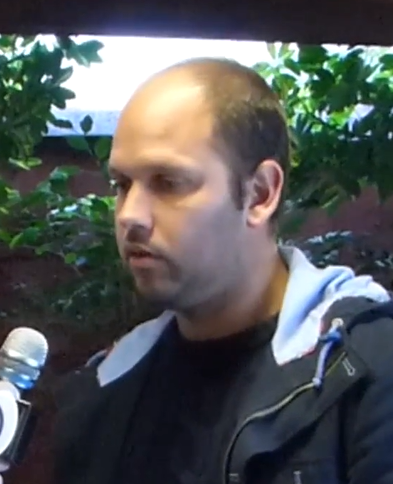
- José Alberto in 2016

Personal information
- Full name: José Alberto López Menéndez
- Date of birth: 21 May 1982 (age 44)
- Place of birth: Oviedo, Spain
- Position: Defender

Team information
- Current team: Racing Santander (manager)

Senior career*
Years	Team	Apps	(Gls)
2001–2002	San Lázaro	14	(0)

Managerial career
- 2001–2006: Oviedo ACF (youth)
- 2006–2007: Vallobín (youth)
- 2007–2008: Astur (youth)
- 2009–2013: Sporting Gijón (youth)
- 2013–2014: Covadonga
- 2014–2016: Sporting Gijón (youth)
- 2016–2018: Sporting Gijón B
- 2018–2019: Sporting Gijón
- 2020–2021: Mirandés
- 2021–2022: Málaga
- 2022–: Racing Santander
- * Club domestic league appearances and goals

José Alberto López Menéndez (born 21 May 1982), known as José Alberto, is a Spanish football manager and former player who played as a defender, he is the currently manager of La Liga club Racing Santander.

== Career ==
Born in Oviedo, Asturias, José Alberto started his career at Astor's youth setup in 2001 (later renamed Oviedo ACF); at that time, he was playing as a senior for Tercera División side San Lázaro, but retired shortly after. In 2006, he took over Vallobín's under-19 squad, but returned to Astur in the following year.

In 2008, José Alberto moved to Sporting de Gijón, being named assistant manager of the under-14s. He was appointed manager of the under-13 team in the following year, and subsequently took over the under-14s.

On 12 October 2013, José Alberto was named manager of Tercera División side Covadonga, and led the side to fifth position during the campaign, one point shy of the play-offs. He resigned the following 19 May, and returned to Sporting on 2 June.

On 9 June 2016, José Alberto was appointed manager of the reserves, freshly relegated to the fourth division. He achieved promotion to the Segunda División B in his first season, and reached the play-offs to the Segunda División in his second.

On 18 November 2018, José Alberto replaced Rubén Baraja at the helm of the first team. His first match in charge occurred five days later, a 2–1 away win against Granada. He was sacked on 21 December 2019, after two losses against fourth-tier Zamora in the Copa del Rey, and Extremadura.

On 27 July 2020, José Alberto was appointed in charge of Mirandés, still in the second division. The following 1 June, he was named in charge of fellow league team Málaga.

On 24 January 2022, after a 5–0 home loss to Ibiza, José Alberto was dismissed by the Andalusians. On 13 December, he replaced sacked Guillermo Fernández Romo at the helm of Racing Santander, also in division two.

== Personal life ==
José Alberto's younger brother Dani was a footballer. A left back, he was a Real Oviedo youth graduate.

== Managerial statistics ==
As of match played 22 November 2026

Managerial record by team and tenure
Team	Nat	From	To	Record								Ref
Team	Nat	From	To	G	W	D	L	GF	GA	GD	Win %	Ref
Covadonga	(Spain)	12 October 2013	19 May 2014	30	19	9	2	62	22	+40	63.33	
Sporting Gijón B	(Spain)	9 June 2016	18 November 2018	125	77	29	19	256	99	+157	61.60	
Sporting Gijón	(Spain)	18 November 2018	21 December 2019	53	20	15	18	55	54	+1	37.74	
Mirandés	(Spain)	27 July 2020	1 June 2021	43	14	12	17	38	42	−4	32.56	
Málaga	(Spain)	1 June 2021	24 January 2022	26	9	7	10	26	36	−10	34.62	
Racing Santander	(Spain)	13 December 2022	Present	173	84	38	51	290	242	+48	48.55	
Total				450	223	110	117	727	495	+232	49.56	—

== Honours ==
=== Manager ===
Racing de Santander

• Segunda División: 2025–26

Sporting de Gijón B

- Tercera División: 2016–17
