= Cristian Devallis =

Argentine footballer (born 1983)

Personal information
- Full name: Cristian Javier Devallis
- Date of birth: 25 August 1983 (age 43)
- Place of birth: Rio Segundo, Argentina
- Height: 1.70 m (5 ft 7 in)
- Positions: Midfielder; right midfielder

Senior career*
Years	Team	Apps	(Gls)
2002–2006	Talleres	63	(5)
2004	→ Almagro (loan)	7	(0)
2005–2006	→ Gimnasia de Jujuy (loan)	10	(1)
2007	Racing de Córdoba	4	(0)
2008–2009	9 de Julio	46	(7)
2009	Santiago Wanderers	15	(0)
2010–2011	Patronato	29	(0)
2011–2012	Boca Unidos	24	(0)
2012	Olympiacos Volos	2	(0)
2013	Rangers	0	(0)
2013	9 de Julio	15	(1)
2013–2014	Tiro Federal	13	(0)
- * Club domestic league appearances and goals

Cristian Javier Devallis (born August 25, 1983, in Rio Segundo, Argentina) is an Argentine former footballer who played as a midfielder.

== Club career ==
Cristian Javier Devallis firstly played for Talleres de Córdoba. In 2004, he moved to Almagro. In 2005, he returned to Talleres de Córdoba. Later, he moved to Gimnasia y Esgrima de Jujuy but one year later he returned again to Talleres de Córdoba. In 2007, he moved to Racing de Córdoba. In 2008, he moved to 9 de Julio de Rafaela and in 2009 to Santiago Wanderers. Later, he moved to Patronato de Paraná. In 2011, he moved to Boca Unidos.

In summer 2012 Devallis moved to Olympiacos Volos In winter of the same year he was released by the club. At the beginning of 2013, he signed with Chilean club Rangers.
