= Georgios Paligeorgos =

Greek footballer

Giorgos Paligeorgos
Personal information
- Full name: Georgios Paligeorgos
- Date of birth: 9 February 1990 (age 36)
- Place of birth: Agrinio, Greece
- Height: 1.70 m (5 ft 7 in)
- Position: Midfielder

Team information
- Current team: Attalos

Youth career
- 2005–2007: AEK Athens

Senior career*
Years	Team	Apps	(Gls)
2006–2011	AEK Athens	1	(0)
2007–2009	→ Anagennisi Karditsa (loan)	30	(0)
2009–2011	→ Thrasyvoulos(loan)	55	(0)
2011–2012	Ethnikos Asteras	9	(0)
2012–2014	Iraklis	32	(0)
2014–2015	Tyrnavos	19	(0)
2015–2016	Kavala		
2016–2018	Aiolikos		
2018–2020	Panthiraikos		
2020–2021	P.A.O. Rouf		
2021–	Attalos		

International career
2006–2009	Greece U19		
- * Club domestic league appearances and goals as of 22 October 2024

Georgios Paligeorgos (Greek: Γεώργιος Παληγεώργος; born 9 February 1990) is a Greek footballer currently playing for Tyrnavos in the Greek Football League. He has previously played for AEK Athens, Anagennisi Karditsa, Thrasyvoulos, Ethnikos Asteras and Iraklis.

He began his career at Elpides Agrinio and moved to AEK's youth teams. Along with Panagiotis Tachtsidis, Michalis Pavlis, Savvas Gentsoglou and many other AEK youth players, they compose a group of players that AEK bases a lot on for the future of the club.

== Career ==
=== Youth years ===
He began his career at Elpides Agriniou and in the summer of 2005 he moved to the academies of AEK Athens. Alongside players such as Panagiotis Tachtsidis, Michalis Pavlis, Savvas Gentsoglou and many others, they composed a group of players that AEK based a lot on for the future of the club.

=== Professional career ===
He was promoted to AEK Athens senior team the 2006–07 season and signed a professional contract until the end of 2010–11 season. His only league appearance with AEK was in May 2007 against Panionios.

For the 2007–08 season, Paligeorgos was loaned out by AEK to Greek Third Division club, Anagennisi Karditsa. He played a major role in Karditsa's promotion to the Second Division. His loan to Karditsa was extended for one more year, before he was loaned to Thrasyvoulos F.C. for the 2009–11 Beta Ethniki season.

In January 2012, Paligeorgos signed for Iraklis. Οn 31 July 2014 he signed a contract with Greek Football League club Tyrnavos.
