= Giannis Stergianos-Michailidis =

Greek footballer

Personal information
- Date of birth: 31 May 1993 (age 33)
- Place of birth: Drama, Greece
- Height: 1.76 m (5 ft 9 in)
- Position: Full back

Senior career*
| Years | Team | Apps | (Gls) |
| 2011–2014 | Doxa Drama | 62 | (0) |
| 2014–2015 | Tyrnavos | 20 | (0) |
| 2015–2016 | Panserraikos | 17 | (0) |
- * Club domestic league appearances and goals

Giannis Stergianos-Michailidis (Greek: Γιάννης Στεργιανός-Μιχαηλίδης; born 21 May 1993) is a Greek professional football player, currently playing for Doxa Drama in the Super League Greece. He made his Super League Greece debut in a game against Panionios.
