= 2012–13 Football League (Greece) =

Football League
- Season: 2012–13
- Dates: 28 September 2012 – 26 May 2013
- Champions: Apollon Smyrnis
- Promoted: Apollon Smyrnis; Ergotelis; AEL Kalloni; Panetolikos
- Relegated: Panserraikos; AEL; Thrasyvoulos; Anagennisi Epanomi
- Matches: 160

The 2012–13 Football League is the second division of the Greek professional football system and the third season under the name Football League after previously being known as Beta Ethniki. Its regular season began on 28 September 2012 and will end on 9 June 2013. The promotion play-offs, are scheduled to take place after regular season.

== Teams ==
Location of teams in 2012–13 Football League

Team	Location	Stadium	Capacity	Last season	Ref
AEL	Larissa	AEL FC Arena	16,118	10th	
AEL Kalloni	Kalloni	Mytilene Municipal Stadium^{2}	4,000	6th	
Anagennisi Epanomi	Epanomi	Nikos Sarafis Stadium	1,736	9th	
Anagennisi Giannitsa	Giannitsa	Giannitsa Municipal Stadium	8,000	13th	
Apollon Smyrnis	Athens	Georgios Kamaras Stadium	14,856	FL2 South, 1st	
Doxa Drama	Drama	Doxa Drama Stadium	7,000	SL, 16th	
Ergotelis	Heraklion	Pankritio Stadium	25,780	SL, 14th	
Ethnikos Gazoros	Gazoros	Serres Municipal Stadium^{1}	9,500	FL2 North, 1st	
Fokikos	Amfissa	Amfissa Municipal Stadium	2,000	14th	
Iraklis Psachna	Psachna	Psachna Municipal Stadium	5,500	11th	
Iraklis	Thessaloniki	Kaftanzoglio Stadium	27,770	FL2 North, 5th	
Kallithea	Kallithea	Grigoris Lambrakis Stadium	4,250	3rd	
Kavala	Kavala	Anthi Karagianni Stadium	10,500	Delta Ethniki, 4th	
Niki Volos	Volos	Panthessaliko Stadium	22,700	FL2 North, 2nd	
Olympiacos Volos	Volos	Panthessaliko Stadium	22,700	-	
Panachaiki	Patras	Kostas Davourlis Stadium	11,321	4th	
Panetolikos	Agrinio	Panetolikos Stadium	6,500	SL, 15th	
Panserraikos	Serres	Serres Municipal Stadium	8,300	7th	
Pierikos	Katerini	Katerini Municipal Stadium	4,956	8th	
Thrasyvoulos	Fyli	Fyli Municipal Stadium	3,142	12th	
Vyzas	Megara	Megara Municipal Stadium	2,350	15th	

1. Ethnikos Gazoros' home 500-seater Gazoros Municipal Stadium doesn't meet Football League regulations.
2. AEL Kalloni's home 800-seater Kalloni Municipal Stadium doesn't meet Football League regulations.

== Structure ==
At present, there are twenty one clubs that compete in the Football League, playing each other in a home and away series. At the end of the season, the bottom three teams are relegated to the Gamma Ethniki. The top three teams gain automatic promotion. However, teams positioned fourth to seventh take part in a promotion play-off. Unlike in Super League, clubs in the Football League do not get relegated if the club fails to obtain a license. All teams in the Football League take part in the Greek Football Cup.

== League table ==
Pos	Team	Pld	W	D	L	GF	GA	GD	Pts	Promotion or relegation
1	Apollon Smyrnis (C, P)	40	22	9	9	50	29	+21	75	Promotion to Super League
2	Ergotelis (P)	40	21	11	8	42	25	+17	74	Promotion to Super League
3	AEL Kalloni (P)	40	20	13	7	48	22	+26	73 (Note: Head-to-head record: AEL Kalloni: 8 pts, Panetolikos: 4 pts, Olympiacos Volos: 3 pts.)	Promotion to Super League
4	Panetolikos (P)	40	20	13	7	55	23	+32	73	Qualification for promotion play-offs
5	Olympiacos Volos	40	19	16	5	49	23	+26	73	Qualification for promotion play-offs
6	Iraklis	40	19	14	7	49	25	+24	71	Qualification for promotion play-offs
7	Niki Volos	40	17	17	6	44	23	+21	68 (Note: Head-to-head record: Niki Volos–Panserraikos 3–0, Panserraikos–Niki Volos 0–1.)	Qualification for promotion play-offs
8	Panserraikos (R)	40	19	11	10	40	29	+11	68	Relegation to Gamma Ethniki
9	Doxa Drama	40	16	12	12	35	27	+8	60	
10	Iraklis Psachna	40	13	16	11	42	37	+5	55	
11	Kavala	40	14	11	15	35	36	−1	53	
12	Kallithea	40	12	14	14	42	44	−2	50	
13	AEL (Note: AEL was docked 21 points, Pierikos was docked 10 points, Anagennisi Giannitsa were docked 4 points, Anagennisi Epanomi were docked 6 points, because of debts to former players according to HFF decisions.) (R)	40	16	15	9	42	26	+16	42	Relegation to Gamma Ethniki
14	Ethnikos Gazoros	40	9	14	17	27	35	−8	41	
15	Panachaiki (Note: On 31 December 2012, Panachaiki was docked 3 points because of the suspension of the Greek Cup match against Olympiacos on 19 December 2012.)	40	9	15	16	32	40	−8	39	
16	Fokikos	40	8	13	19	28	51	−23	37	
17	Vyzas	40	7	11	22	22	49	−27	32	
18	Anagennisi Giannitsa	40	9	7	24	35	68	−33	30	
19	Pierikos	40	9	12	19	33	61	−28	29	
20	Thrasyvoulos (Note: Thrasyvoulos was docked 6 points because of debts to former players according to HFF decision. On 19 April 2013, Thrasyvoulos was docked 3 points because of debts to a former player.) (R)	40	6	13	21	22	47	−25	22	Relegation to Gamma Ethniki
21	Anagennisi Epanomi (R)	40	2	9	29	24	74	−50	9	Relegation to Gamma Ethniki

Source: Football League standings
Rules for classification: 1st points; 2nd head-to-head points; 3rd head-to-head goal difference
(C) Champions; (P) Promoted; (R) Relegated

== Results ==
Home \ Away	AEL	AEP	AGN	APS	DDR	ERG	GAZ	FOK	IPS	IRT	KLT	KAL	KAV	NVL	OVL	PCK	PNT	PSE	PIE	THR	VYZ
AEL		3–1	3–0	2–1	0–0	0–1	2–1	5–0	1–0	0–0	2–1	0–1	1–0	1–1	3–0	1–1	0–0	0–1	4–2	1–1	1–0
Anagennisi Epanomi	0–1		0–3	1–3	0–1	1–2	0–0	1–3	1–1	1–3	2–1	2–1	0–1	1–2	0–1	1–1	0–0	0–0	0–0	2–5	0–0
Anagennisi Giannitsa	2–0	2–2		0–0	0–1	1–2	0–1	0–0	1–2	0–0	0–0	0–3	0–2	1–1	0–1	0–1	0–3	1–0	3–1	2–1	2–1
Apollon Smyrnis	4–2	2–0	4–2		2–0	2–1	1–1	2–0	0–0	1–1	3–1	0–0	1–0	1–1	0–1	2–1	0–2	0–1	2–0	1–0	1–0
Doxa Drama	1–1	2–0	2–3	0–1		1–0	2–0	1–1	1–1	0–2	1–2	1–0	2–0	1–1	0–0	1–0	0–1	1–1	2–0	1–0	1–0
Ergotelis	0–0	2–0	4–1	1–0	1–0		1–0	0–0	1–0	0–1	2–1	0–0	2–1	0–0	2–0	1–0	2–1	0–0	2–1	2–0	1–0
Ethnikos Gazoros	0–0	1–0	0–1	1–0	1–0	0–1		4–0	1–1	1–3	2–0	0–0	0–1	1–1	0–0	1–0	0–0	0–1	2–1	1–1	0–1
Fokikos	0–0	1–1	3–0	1–2	0–1	2–1	1–0		1–2	0–1	0–0	0–0	3–2	0–2	0–0	1–1	0–1	1–3	1–0	1–0	1–0
Iraklis Psachna	1–0	4–3	5–1	0–0	2–0	0–1	1–0	1–1		0–3	0–0	1–0	2–0	1–3	1–1	0–1	0–1	0–0	2–0	2–0	2–1
Iraklis	1–0	2–0	3–1	0–1	0–0	1–1	3–3	2–2	1–1		0–0	0–1	1–0	0–0	0–1	2–0	0–2	2–0	3–0	2–1	3–0
Kallithea	0–1	5–0	3–2	2–1	0–0	2–1	1–0	2–1	1–1	0–1		1–0	2–2	1–0	0–2	3–3	1–1	2–3	3–1	1–0	0–0
AEL Kalloni	1–0	3–1	2–0	0–2	1–0	0–0	0–0	3–0	2–1	1–1	2–0		2–1	0–2	2–2	2–0	2–0	1–0	5–2	3–0	3–1
Kavala	1–1	3–0	2–1	1–3	1–2	0–0	2–2	1–0	0–0	0–0	1–0	1–0		1–0	1–0	2–1	0–0	0–1	0–1	1–1	1–0
Niki Volos	0–0	4–1	1–0	1–1	0–0	1–1	1–0	1–0	0–0	1–0	3–1	0–0	0–2		1–1	3–1	3–0	3–0	1–1	2–0	2–0
Olympiacos Volos	0–0	2–0	1–0	3–0	2–0	2–0	2–0	0–0	2–0	1–0	1–1	1–1	2–0	0–0		0–1	0–0	2–1	4–1	3–1	3–0
Panachaiki	1–1	1–0	1–1	1–2	0–0	1–3	2–0	3–0	1–1	0–0	0–1	0–0	0–1	0–1	1–1		1–0	0–0	0–0	1–0	2–1
Panetolikos	0–1	4–1	1–0	0–0	2–0	1–0	2–2	1–0	1–2	3–0	1–1	0–1	0–0	0–0	3–2	4–3		0–0	4–0	3–0	3–0
Panserraikos	1–0	2–1	2–1	1–0	0–1	2–0	0–1	2–1	1–0	2–2	1–0	1–3	2–1	0–1	2–2	2–1	0–0		3–0	0–0	3–0
Pierikos	0–0	1–0	4–0	0–1	0–3	1–1	1–0	3–1	2–2	0–1	1–1	1–1	1–1	2–0	0–2	0–0	0–4	1–0		1–0	2–1
Thrasyvoulos	0–1	1–0	4–1	0–2	0–4	0–1	1–0	1–1	1–1	0–2	0–0	0–1	1–0	1–0	1–1	0–0	1–3	0–0	0–0		0–0
Vyzas	0–3	3–0	1–2	0–1	1–1	1–1	0–0	1–0	2–1	0–2	2–1	0–0	1–1	2–0	0–0	1–0	0–3	0–1	1–1	0–0	

Source: Soccerway
Legend: Blue = home team win; Yellow = draw; Red = away team win.

== Promotion play-offs ==
The promotion play-offs will comprise the teams ranked 3rd through 6th during the regular season, and they are scheduled to take place immediately after the conclusion of the regular season. Niki Volos started the playoffs with a one-point disadvantage, because of their worse position in contrast to the other teams, when the main season finished.

Pos	Team	Pld	W	D	L	GF	GA	GD	Pts	Promotion or relegation	PNT	IRT	OVL	NVL
1	Panetolikos (P)	6	4	1	1	10	6	+4	14	Promotion to Super League		2–0	2–1	2–1
2	Iraklis	6	3	0	3	7	8	−1	10		2–1		0–1	4–0
3	Olympiacos Volos	6	2	2	2	9	6	+3	9		1–2	4–0		1–1
4	Niki Volos	6	0	3	3	4	10	−6	3		1–1	0–1	1–1	

Legend: Blue = home team win; Yellow = draw; Red = away team win.
Rules for classification: 1) points; 2) goal difference; 3) number of goals scored.
(P) Promoted

== Top scorers ==
Rank	Player	Club	Goals
1	(Greece) Michalis Manias	Apollon Smyrnis	18
2	(Brazil) Alexandre D'Acol	Kallithea	16
3	(Greece) Giorgos Manousos	AEL Kalloni	14
4	(Serbia) Milan Bojović	Panetolikos	12
5	(Nigeria) Patrick Ogunsoto	Anagennisi Epanomi/Olympiacos Volos	11
5	(Netherlands) Leandro Kappel	Doxa Drama	11
7	(Greece) Konstantinos Fligos	Niki Volos	10
8	(Greece) Giannis Katsikis	Apollon Smyrnis	9
