= Vataniakos F.C. =

Greek football club

Vataniakos
- Full name: Athlitikos Morfotikos Syllogos Vataniakos
- Founded: 1978; 48 years ago
- Ground: Vatan Municipal Stadium
- Capacity: 800
- Chairman: Gerasimos Potouridis
- Manager: Georgios Potouridis
- League: Pieria FCA First Division
- 2025–26: Pieria FCA Second Division, 1st (promoted)

Vataniakos Football Club (Greek: Α.Μ.Σ. Βατανιακός Κατερίνης) is a Greek football club, based in Vatan, a district of Katerini. The association football section was founded in 1978.

== History ==
In 1978, Athlitikos Morfotikos Syllogos "Vataniakos" Katerini was established. Their colours are white, green and red. In 2011, they promoted to Football League 2 for the first time in their history. On 8 January 2012, they achieved their first victory in professional leagues, defeating Oikonomos Tsaritsani by 2–1 at home.

== Honours ==
=== Regional ===
- Pieria FCA First Division (3): 2003–04, 2007–08, 2022–23
- Pieria FCA Cup (2): 2007–08, 2021–22
