= Iraklis Psachna F.C. =

Iraklis Psachna
- Full name: Iraklis Psachna Football Club
- Founded: 1936; 90 years ago
- Ground: Psachna Municipal Stadium
- Capacity: 3,500
- Chairman: Giorgos Stoupas
- Manager: Thanos Kioupkiolis
- League: Euboea FCA Second Division
- 2025–26: Euboea FCA Third Division (Group 1), 1st (promoted)
Home colours

Iraklis Psachna Football Club is a Greek football club, based in Psachna, Euboea.

== History ==
In 2009–10, Psachna earned promotion to the third tier of Greek football, Football League 2, for the first time in club history, as champions of Delta Ethniki Group 7.

In 2010–11, Psachna earned promotion to the second tier of Greek football, the Football League, for the first time in club history.

On 27 November 2011, in the fourth week of the 2011–12 Football League season, Iraklis Psachna achieved its first win in the Greek second tier in club history—a 2–0 defeat of Diagoras.

== Honours ==
- Delta Ethniki
  - Winners (1): 2009–10 (Group 7)
- Euboea FCA First Division
  - Winners (6): 1974–75, 1977–78, 1993–94, 1995–96, 2007–08, 2019–20
- Euboea FCA Cup
  - Winners (7): 1974–75, 1982–83, 1995–96, 2002–03, 2006–07, 2009–10, 2016–17
