= Anagennisi Epanomi F.C. =

Anagennisi Epanomi
- Full name: Anamorfotikos Syllogos "Anagennisi" Epanomis
- Founded: 1926; 100 years ago
- Ground: Epanomi Municipal Stadium "Nikos Sarafis", Epanomi, Thessaloniki
- Capacity: 1,300
- Chairman: Dionysis Kritsolis
- Manager: Ilias Galanopoulos
- League: Macedonia FCA Third Division
- 2025–26: Macedonia FCA Third Division (Group 4), 6th
Home colours	Away colours

Anamorfotikos Syllogos "Anagennisi" Epanomis (Greek: Αναμορφωτικός Σύλλογος «Αναγέννηση» Επανομής, lit. 'Epanomi Reformative Club "Renaissance"') is a Greek association football club based in Epanomi, Thessaloniki, Greece.

== History ==
The club was founded in the year 1926. In the period 1971–1972, it won the Macedonia FCA and the Greek FCA Winners' Championship, as a result of which it was promoted to Betta Ethniki, where it remained until 1982, for ten seasons. Twenty-nine years later, in the 2010-11 season, it won the championship of the northern group of the 3rd National Division, as a result of which it was promoted to the 2nd National League, where it remained for 2 years, until the 2012–13 season. From the 2013–14 season and for 10 years, he competed in the amateur championships of Macedonia FCA. In the 2014–15 season, Anagennisi finished 3rd in the 3rd group of the 1st amateur division and participated in the promotion playoffs for A1, formerly the 4th national division, without success. In season 2022-23 finished second in Macedonia FCA championship and take a wild card from the Hellenic Football Federation to participate in 2023–24 Gamma Ethniki.

== Honours ==
=== Domestic ===
  - Gamma Ethniki Champions: 1
    - 2010–11
  - Delta Ethniki Champions: 1
    - 2008–09
  - Greek FCA Winners' Championship Champions: 1
    - 1971–72
  - Macedonia FCA Champions: 3
    - 1970–71, 1971–72, 2016–17
