= 2013–14 Iraklis F.C. season =

G.S. Iraklis Thessalonikis 2013–14 association football season

Iraklis
2013–14 season
- President: Theodoros Papadopoulos
- Manager: Siniša Gogić (until 25 October 2013); Guillermo Hoyos (from 3 November 2013 to 20 April 2014); Nikos Papadopoulos (from 20 April 2014)
- Stadium: Kaftanzoglio Stadium
- Football League: 7th
- Greek Football Cup: Third round
- Top goalscorer: League: Dario Zahora (9); All: Dario Zahora (10)
Home colours	Away colours

The 2013–2014 season was Iraklis second consecutive season in the Football League and third overall.

Iraklis beat Tyrnavos and Skoda Xanthi on their way to the Round of 16 in the Greek Cup, where they were eliminated by rivals PAOK.

== Players ==
=== First team ===
No.	Name	Nationality	Position	Date of birth (age)	Signed from	Signed in	Apps.	Goals
Goalkeepers
1	Huanderson Junior da Silva Santos	(Brazil)	GK	3 August 1983 (age 43)	Rio Ave	2012	39	0
71	Fotis Kipouros (VC)	(Greece)	GK	9 August 1975 (age 51)	Platanias	2013	0	0
86	Enea Koliqi	(Albania) (Greece)	GK	13 February 1986 (age 40)	Flamurtari Vlorë	2013	0	0
Defenders
2	Michalis Boukouvalas	(Greece)	RB	14 January 1988 (age 38)	Kerkyra	2013	0	0
4	Nikolaos Savidis	(Greece)	CB	20 July 1992 (age 34)	Panserraikos	2011	38	1
5	Stefanos Kragiopoulos	(Greece)	CB	31 January 1990 (age 36)	Pierikos	2012	1	0
6	Angelos Papasterianos	(Greece)	DF	11 July 1991 (age 35)	Iraklis Academy	2011	28	1
13	Petros Konteon	(Greece)	CB	9 May 1984 (age 42)	Doxa Drama	2013	0	0
21	Dimitris Kontodimos	(Greece)	LB	21 April 1982 (age 44)	Niki Volos	2013	0	0
Midfielders
11	Nikos Pourtoulidis	(Greece)	DM	7 October 1983 (age 43)	Niki Volos	2013	0	0
12	Savvas Siatravanis	(Greece)	AM	24 November 1992 (age 33)	AEL	2013	22	4
18	Vítor Lima (VC)	(Portugal)	DM	10 August 1981 (age 45)	Ethnikos Achna	2013	0	0
22	Charalambos Sarafoglou	(Greece)	MF	2 January 1993 (age 33)	Iraklis Academy	2011	18	1
26	Hassoma Bino Bamba	(Ivory Coast)	DM	21 December 1990 (age 35)		2013	0	0
66	Giorgos Paligiorgos	(Greece)	MF	9 February 1990 (age 36)	Ethnikos Asteras	2012	44	1
87	Taianan Linhares Welker (C)	(Brazil) (Spain)	AM	13 March 1987 (age 39)	SV Grödig	2013	17	4
88	Lefteris Intzoglou	(Greece)	AM	3 March 1987 (age 39)	Doxa Drama	2013	0	0
Forwards
9	Giorgos Chionidis	(Greece)	FW	25 June 1991 (age 35)	Pontioi Katerini	2012	32	6
20	Lefteris Matsoukas	(Greece)	FW	7 March 1990 (age 36)	Kallithea	2013	0	0
27	Dario Zahora	(Croatia)	FW	21 March 1982 (age 44)	Ergotelis	2013	0	0
94	Kosmas Tsilianidis	(Greece)	FW	9 May 1994 (age 32)	Iraklis Academy	2011	10	1
99	Benjamin Onwuachi	(Nigeria)	FW	9 April 1984 (age 42)	Skoda Xanthi	2013	0	0

== Transfers ==
=== In ===
==== Summer ====
Date	Player	From	Fee	Source
4 July 2013	(Croatia) Dario Zahora	(Greece) Ergotelis	Free	
5 July 2013	(Greece) Dimitris Kontodimos	(Greece) Niki Volos	Free	
8 July 2013	(Serbia) Aleksandar Simić	(Greece) Panserraikos	Free	
12 July 2013	(Greece) Nikos Pourtoulidis	(Greece) Niki Volos	Free	
12 July 2013	(Portugal) Vítor Lima	(Cyprus) Ethnikos Achna	Free	
15 July 2013	(Greece) Anastasios Kyriakos	(Greece) Niki Volos	Free	
15 July 2013	(Greece) Petros Konteon	(Greece) Doxa Drama	Free	
16 July 2013	(Greece) Fotis Kipouros	(Greece) Platanias	Free	
18 July 2013	(Greece) Charalampos Brilakis	(Greece) Doxa Drama	Free	
23 July 2013	(Greece) Michalis Boukouvalas	(Greece) Kerkyra	Free	
30 July 2013	(Nigeria) Benjamin Onwuachi	(Greece) Skoda Xanthi	Free	
1 August 2013	(Albania) Enea Koliqi	(Albania) Flamurtari Vlorë	Free	
2 August 2013	(Greece) Lefteris Intzoglou	(Greece) Doxa Drama	Free	
4 August 2013	(Greece) Lefteris Matsoukas	(Greece) Kallithea	Free	
13 August 2013	(Greece) Stratos Chintzidis	(Greece) Apollon Smyrnis	Free	
29 August 2013	(Ivory Coast) Hassoma Bino Bamba		Free	
11 September 2013	(Czech Republic) Marek Jarolím	(China) Hangzhou Greentown	Free	

==== Winter ====
Date	Player	From	Fee	Source
30 January 2014	(Greece) Theofilos Kouroupis	(Greece) Anagennisi Giannitsa	Free	
31 January 2014	(Greece) Kyriakos Grammatikos	(Greece) Kavala	Free	
4 February 2014	(Uruguay) Enzo Scorza	(Peru) Cienciano	Free	
8 February 2014	(Greece) Panagiotis Kourdakis	(Greece) OFI	Free	

=== Out ===
==== Summer ====
Date	Player	To	Fee	Source
June 2013	(Spain) Isaac Jové Rubí	(Greece) Niki Volos	Free	
June 2013	(Spain) Dani López	(Spain) Real Avilés	Free	
June 2013	(Portugal) Julien Fernandes	(Greece) Aiginiakos	Free	
8 June 2013	(France) Kendal Ucar	(Switzerland) Bassecourt	Free	
June 2013	(Spain) Antoni Lluís Adrover Colom		Free	
1 July 2013	(Greece) Christos Paligiorgos	(Greece) Panachaiki	Free	
5 July 2013	(North Macedonia) Hristijan Kirovski	(Bulgaria) CSKA Sofia	Free	
8 July 2013	(Greece) Nikos Soulidis		Free	
8 July 2013	(Greece) Nikolaos Troiris	(Greece) Panelefsiniakos	Free	
8 July 2013	(Greece) German Datidis	(Greece) Tyrnavos	Free	
8 July 2013	(Greece) Akis Georgiou	(Greece) Tyrnavos	Free	
11 July 2013	(Greece) Antonis Natsouras	(Greece) Glyfada	Free	
12 July 2013	(Greece) Panagiotis Papadopoulos	(Greece) Vyzas	Free	
20 July 2013	(Greece) Stavros Vagelopoulos	(Greece) Panachaiki	Free	
5 August 2013	(Greece) Giorgos Papadopoulos	(Greece) Iraklis Ampelokipon	Free	
5 August 2013	(Greece) Alexandros Mavridis	(Greece) Kavala	Free	
17 August 2013	(Greece) Nestoras Stefanidis	(Greece) AEL	Free	
27 August 2013	(Serbia) Aleksandar Simić	(Greece) Kerkyra	Free	

==== Winter ====
Date	Player	To	Fee	Source
November 2013	(Greece) Stratos Chintzidis	(Greece) Panachaiki	Free	
November 2013	(Greece) Alexandros Natsiopoulos	(Greece) Ethnikos Gazoros	Free	
November 2013	(Greece) Dimitrios Tserkezos	(Greece) Apollon Kalamarias	Free	
December 2013	(Greece) Anastasios Kyriakos	(Greece) Paniliakos	Free	
January 2014	(Greece) Charalampos Brilakis	(Greece) Kallithea	Free	
January 2014	(Greece) Kyriakos Kivrakidis	(Greece) Aiginiakos	15,000 €	
January 2014	(Greece) Panagiotis Vosniadis	(Greece) Aiginiakos	Free	
January 2014	(Czech Republic) Marek Jarolím	(Czech Republic) Slovan Liberec	Free	
January 2014	(Albania) Artan Thorja	(Albania) FK Kukësi	Free	
January 2014	(Greece) Paschalis Voutsias	(Greece) Vataniakos	Free	

=== Loan out ===
Start date	Player	To	End date	Source
16 August 2013	(Greece) Kyriakos Kivrakidis	(Greece) Aiginiakos	June 2014	
27 August 2013	(Greece) Christos Alexiou	(Greece) Kavala	June 2014	

== Club ==
=== Coaching staff ===
Position	Staff
Head coach	(Argentina) Guillermo Ángel Hoyos
Assistant coach	(Greece) Apostolos Kobolias
General manager	(Greece) Giorgos Karaiskos
Technical director	(Greece) Kostas Tsalikis
Physical trainer	(Greece) Vassilis Kalapotharakos
Goalkeeper trainer	(Greece) Fotios Gizelis
Doctor	(Greece) Manolis Papakostas
Physiotherapist	(Greece) Konstantinos Tsiolakidis
Care taker	(Greece) Georgios Siagas
Youth team manager	(Greece) Pagonis Vakalopoulos
Academy director	(Greece) Savvas Kofidis

Last updated: August 2013

=== Other information ===
Chairman	(Greece) Theodoros Papadopoulos
Vice President	(Greece) Argiris Asfaltidis
Team Director	(Greece) Giorgos Bezas
Marketing Director	(Greece) Nikos Gramenos
Press Secretary	(Greece) Theodoros Papadopoulos
Secretary	(Greece) Eva Galanopoulou
Ground (capacity and dimensions)	Kaftanzoglio Stadium (28,028 / 68x105 m)
Training ground	Mikra Training Center

=== Kit ===
Supplier: Nike
Sponsor(s): OPAP

Home	Away	Third kit

== Pre-season and friendlies ==
4 August 2013	Iraklis	1–1	Pierikos	Dobrinishte
18:00 EEST	Voutsias 22'	Report	Kaptiev 90'

7 August 2013	Iraklis	2–1	Bansko	Dobrinishte
18:30 EEST	Kyriakos 30'; Brilakis 89'	Report	Dimitrov 65'

11 August 2013	Iraklis	0–1	Teuta Durrës	Blagoevgrad
18:30 EEST		Report	Mançaku 59'

21 August 2013	Makedonikos	1–0	Iraklis	Thessaloniki
18:30 EEST	Karamatsakidis 55' (pen.)	Report	Kyriakos (penalty missed) 64'	Stadium: Makedonikos Stadium

25 August 2013	Agrotikos Asteras	0–0	Iraklis	Thessaloniki
18:30 EEST		Report		Stadium: Agrotikos Asteras Stadium

28 August 2013	Iraklis	3–1	Apollon Kalamarias	Thessaloniki
18:00 EEST	Zahora 11'; Chintzidis 62'; Bamba 71'	Report	Provatidis 85'	Stadium: Kaftanzoglio Stadium

1 September 2013	Anagennisi Giannitsa	1–2	Iraklis	Mylotopos
18:00 EEST	Palaskas 56'		Matsoukas 45'; Kontodimos 65'

8 September 2013	Iraklis	0–0	Veria	Thessaloniki
17:30 EEST		Report		Stadium: Kaftanzoglio Stadium

== Football League ==
=== League table ===
Pos	Team	Pld	W	D	L	GF	GA	GD	Pts	Qualification or relegation
2	Niki Volos (Q)	26	17	5	4	47	12	+35	56	Qualification to Promotion Play-offs
3	Aiginiakos (Q)	26	14	9	3	45	15	+30	51	Qualification to Promotion Play-offs
4	Iraklis (Q)	26	15	3	8	36	19	+17	48	Qualification to Promotion Play-offs
5	Anagennisi Karditsa	26	12	8	6	28	20	+8	44	
6	Tyrnavos	26	11	8	7	27	22	+5	41	

Source: footballleaguenews.gr
Rules for classification: 1) points, 2) head-to-head points
(Q) Qualified for the phase indicated

==== Results summary ====
Overall								Home						Away					
Pld	W	D	L	GF	GA	GD	Pts	W	D	L	GF	GA	GD	W	D	L	GF	GA	GD
26	15	3	8	36	19	+17	48	10	1	2	26	9	+17	5	2	6	10	10	0

Last updated: 31 March 2014.
Source: Competitive matches

==== Results by round ====
Round	1	2	3	4	5	6	7	8	9	10	11	12	13	14	15	16	17	18	19	20	21	22	23	24	25	26
Ground	A	H	A	H	A	A	H	A	H	A	H	H	A	H	A	H	A	H	H	A	H	A	H	A	A	H
Result	L	W	D	W	L	L	D	L	W	W	W	W	D	W	W	W	W	W	L	W	L	W	W	L	L	W
Position	10	7	8	6	7	8	9	9	9	8	6	4	4	4	3	3	3	2	3	2	4	3	3	4	4	4

A = Away; H = Home; W = Win; D = Draw; L = Loss

==== Matches ====
30 September 2013 1	Kavala	3–2	Iraklis	Kavala
18:00 EEST	Papargyriou 18'; Loukaris 44'; Giannikoglou (yellow card) 52'; Doutsaridis (yellow card) 56'; Karlopoulos 74'	Report; Live TV: OTE Sport	Zahora 53'; Boukouvalas (yellow card) 57'; Papasterianos (red card) 62'; Intzoglou (yellow card) 70'; Brilakis 87'	Stadium: Anthi Karagianni Stadium; Referee: Christos Granas (Xanthi)

7 October 2013 2	Iraklis	2–0	Ethnikos Gazoros	Thessaloniki
18:00 EEST	Zahora 6' (pen.); Bamba (yellow card) 9'; Onwuachi (yellow card) 22'; Matsoukas (yellow card) 72'; Siatravanis 87'	Report; Live TV: OTE Sport	Đurić (yellow card) 5'; Gaidartzis (yellow card) 31'; Nyrlos (yellow card) 36'	Stadium: Kaftanzoglio Stadium; Referee: Dimitris Karantonis (Imathia)

12 October 2013 3	Pierikos	0–0	Iraklis	Katerini
18:00 EEST	Seretis (yellow card) 22'; Kroustalelis (yellow card) 40'; Nikou (yellow card) 51'	Report; Live TV: OTE Sport	Bamba (yellow card) 33'; Boukouvalas (yellow card) 56'	Stadium: Municipal Stadium of Katerini; Referee: Evangelos Kiotzenis (Kavala)

20 October 2013 4	Iraklis	2–1	Anagennisi Giannitsa	Thessaloniki
16:00 EEST	Jarolím 9'; Lima (yellow card) 13'; Kyriakos 39'; Pourtoulidis (yellow card) 45'	Report; Live TV:	Ivanidis (yellow card) 33'; Karambelas 73'; Sidiropoulos (yellow card) 83'	Stadium: Kaftanzoglio Stadium; Referee: Ioannis Angelakopoulos (Karditsa)

25 October 2013 5	Vataniakos	1–0	Iraklis	Katerini
16:00 EEST	Kolaxidis (yellow card) 11' (yellow-red card) 49'; Giannoulis 46'; Miljevic (yellow card) 79'; Gialamidis (yellow card) 90+1'; Kotsiopoulos (yellow card) 90+1'	Report; Live TV:	Siatravanis (yellow card) 51'; Boukouvalas (yellow card) 62'; Savidis (yellow card) 82'	Stadium: Municipal Stadium of Katerini; Referee: Andreas Karaliolios (Grevena)

4 November 2013 6	Niki Volos	2–0	Iraklis	Volos
16:00 EET	Manousakis 32'; Zouliotis (yellow card) 34'; Jesic 90+3'	Report; Live TV: OTE Sport	Onwuachi (yellow card) 18'; Savidis (yellow card) 46' (yellow-red card) 64'	Stadium: Panthessaliko Stadium; Referee: Nikos Papageorgiou (Athens)

11 November 2013 7	Iraklis	1–1	Doxa Drama	Thessaloniki
18:00 EET	Taianan (yellow card) 22'; Boukouvalas (yellow card) 43'; Kyriakos 45', (yellow card) 87'; Tsilianidis (yellow card) 49'; Lima (yellow card) 90+1'	Report; Live TV: OTE Sport	Chintaseli (yellow card) 12'; Kassos 28'; Vlasopoulos (yellow card) 77'	Stadium: Kaftanzoglio Stadium; Referee: Alexandros Katsikogiannis (Epirus)
Note: Matsoukas of Iraklis and Dafkos of Doxa Drama were booked (yellow card) during half-time.

18 November 2013 8	Tyrnavos	1–0	Iraklis	Tyrnavos
18:00 EET	Siatras (yellow card) 17'; Datidis (yellow card) 34'; Sachinidis 67'; Carlos André (yellow card) 71'; Dallas (yellow card) 90+2'	Report; Live TV: OTE Sport	Lima (yellow card) 14'; Tsilianidis (yellow card) 38'; Papasterianos (yellow card) 65'; Jarolím (yellow card) 84'; Brilakis (yellow card) 85'	Stadium: Tyrnavos Stadium; Referee: Dimitrios Balatsoukas (Thesprotia)

25 November 2013 9	Iraklis	1–0	Kerkyra	Thessaloniki
16:00 EET	Jarolím 16'; Zahora (yellow card) 55'; Kontodimos (yellow card) 88'; Bamba (yellow card) 90+2'	Report; Live TV: OTE Sport	Gyftokostas (yellow card) 89'	Stadium: Kaftanzoglio Stadium; Referee: Fotis Teretidis (Kavala)

1 December 2013 10	Apollon Kalamarias	0–1	Iraklis	Thessaloniki
18:00 EET	Pitsokos (yellow card) 25'; Vergos (yellow card) 30'; Kiskabanis (yellow card) 41'; Manousaridis (yellow card) 90+1'	Report; Live TV: OTE Sport	Tai (yellow card) 17' (yellow-red card) 85'; Zahora (yellow card) 18'; Jarolím 79'; Papasterianos (yellow card) 80'	Stadium: Kalamaria Stadium; Referee: Christos Granas (Xanthi)

8 December 2013 11	Iraklis	2–1	Aiginiakos	Thessaloniki
15:00 EET	Konteon 11'; Zahora 37'; Matsoukas (yellow card) 70'; Onwuachi (yellow card) 81'	Report	Sikimić (yellow card) 46'; Milošković 89'	Stadium: Kaftanzoglio Stadium; Referee: Evangelos Gratsanis (Trikala)

15 December 2013 12	Iraklis	3–1	Anagennisi Karditsa	Thessaloniki
15:00 EET	Zahora 17', (yellow card) 36'; Konteon (yellow card) 54'; Tsilianidis 68'; Pourtoulidis 88' (pen.)	Report	Koukoulis (yellow card) 23' (yellow-red card) 78'; Michos (yellow card) 25'; Rovas (yellow card) 33'; Boudouris 40'; Siaravas (yellow card) 87'	Stadium: Kaftanzoglio Stadium; Referee: Fotis Fotiadis (Kastoria)

22 December 2013 13	Zakynthos	0–0	Iraklis	Zakynthos
15:00 EET	Solferino (yellow card) 24'; Oikonomou (yellow card) 55'	Report	Huanderson (yellow card) 58'; Papasterianos (yellow card) 83'	Stadium: Zakynthians Olympic Champions Ground; Referee: Aristotelis Diamantopoulos (Arcadia)

5 January 2014 14	Iraklis	1–0	Kavala	Thessaloniki
15:00 EET	Zahora 80'	Report	Chortsas (yellow card) 24'; Valerianos (yellow card) 47'; Domi (yellow card) 58'; Pallas (yellow card) 89'	Stadium: Kaftanzoglio Stadium; Referee: Dimitrios Maloutas (Imathia)

13 January 2014 15	Ethnikos Gazoros	0–2	Iraklis	Serres
18:00 EET	Tsouvaltsidis (yellow card) 71'; Mbarga (yellow card) 86'; Nastevski (yellow card) 90+4'	Report; Live TV: OTE Sport	Boukouvalas 21'; Matsoukas (yellow card) 44'; Onwuachi 49'; Konteon (yellow card) 90'; Kragiopoulos (yellow card) 90+2'	Stadium: Serres Municipal Stadium; Referee: Valantis Vrakas (Euboea)

19 January 2014 16	Iraklis	6–0	Pierikos	Thessaloniki
18:00 EET	Karagounis 29' (o.g.); Zahora 32'; Lima (yellow card) 39'; Onwuachi 51'; Pourtoulidis 58'; Tai 64'; Tsilianidis 90+3'	Report; Live TV: OTE Sport	Michailidis (yellow card) 30'; Nikou (yellow card) 42'; Dojkić (yellow card) 85'	Stadium: Kaftanzoglio Stadium; Referee: Agisilaos Bourmasopoulos (Larissa)

26 January 2014 17	Anagennisi Giannitsa	0–1	Iraklis	Giannitsa
15:00 EET	Sarros (yellow card) 40'; Baxevanos (yellow card) 67' (yellow-red card) 75'	Report	Intzoglou (yellow card) 11'; Pourtoulidis (yellow card) 35'; Zahora 44'	Stadium: Giannitsa Stadium; Referee: Dionisios Zougras (Kozani)

2 February 2014 18	Iraklis	3–1	Vataniakos	Thessaloniki
15:00 EET	Konteon (yellow card) 12'; Tai 39'; Zahora 41'; Siatravanis 66'; Papasterianos (yellow card) 68'; Kontodimos (yellow card) 90'	Report	Lagdaris (yellow card) 27'; Yiaxis 69'; Stoubos (yellow card) 90+1'	Stadium: Kaftanzoglio Stadium; Referee: Christos Manouras (Trikala)

10 February 2014 19	Iraklis	1–2	Niki Volos	Thessaloniki
18:00 EET	Intzoglou 42'; Tai (yellow card) 68'	Report; Live TV: OTE Sport	Isaac 14'; Soiledis (yellow card) 21' (yellow-red card) 24'; Añete (yellow card) 26', (goal) 50'	Stadium: Kaftanzoglio Stadium; Referee: Georgios Foukakis (Heraklion)

16 February 2014 20	Doxa Drama	0–2	Iraklis	Drama
15:00 EET	Kassos (yellow card) 13'; Stoikos (yellow card) 30'; Diamantopoulos (yellow card) 36'	Report	Zahora 5', (yellow card) 23'; Papasterianos (yellow card) 26' (yellow-red card) 70'; Kontodimos (yellow card) 30'; Tai 52', (yellow card) 53'; Savidis (yellow card) 86'	Stadium: Doxa Dramas Stadium; Referee: Panagiotis Koemtzidis (Pieria)

23 February 2014 21	Iraklis	0–1	Tyrnavos	Thessaloniki
15:00 EET	Zahora (yellow card) 58'		Sachinidis 23'; Skoupras (yellow card) 36'; Tellos (yellow card) 65'; Priftis (yellow card) 90'	Stadium: Kaftanzoglio Stadium; Referee: Georgios Kyriazidis (Evros)

3 March 2014 22	Kerkyra	0–1	Iraklis	Kerkyra
18:00 EET	Andreopoulos (yellow card) 27'; Paraskevaidis (yellow card) 49'; Baldovaliev (yellow card) 52'; Zorbas (yellow card) 78'	Summary; Live TV: OTE Sport	Taianan (yellow card) 27'; Pourtoulidis 34'; Konteon (yellow card) 57'; Koliqi (yellow card) 73'; Tsilianidis (yellow card) 80'; Bamba (yellow card) 90+4'	Stadium: Kerkyra Stadium; Referee: Aristidis Vatsios (West Attica)

10 March 2014 23	Iraklis	2–0	Apollon Kalamarias	Thessaloniki
18:00 EET	Matsoukas (yellow card) 13'; Bamba (yellow card) 32'; Onwuachi 48'; Intzoglou (yellow card) 65'; Scorza 78'	Live TV: OTE Sport	Pelkas (yellow card) 18'; Nalbantis (yellow card) 77'; Tzandaris (yellow card) 90+1'	Stadium: Kaftanzoglio Stadium; Referee: Evangelos Gratsanis (Trikala)

16 March 2014 24	Aiginiakos	1–0	Iraklis	Aiginio
15:00 EET	Giazitzoglou (yellow card) 57'; Koutsospyros 78'; Gesios (yellow card) 84'; Chatzis (yellow card) 90+2'	Live TV:	Lima (yellow card) 50'; Sarafoglou (yellow card) 80'	Stadium: Municipal Stadium of Aiginio; Referee: Thanasis Tzilos (Larissa)

23 March 2014 25	Anagennisi Karditsa	2–1	Iraklis	Karditsa
15:00 EET	Chatzirizos 28'; Karachalios (yellow card) 33'; Ifantis 90+2'	Live TV: OTE Sport	Papasterianos (yellow card) 18'; Tsilianidis 25'; Kontodimos (yellow card) 32'; Konteon (yellow card) 55'	Stadium: Karditsa Stadium; Referee: Spiros Selimos (Laconia)

29 March 2014 26	Iraklis	2–1	Zakynthos	Thessaloniki
15:00 EET	Tsilianidis 28'; Pourtoulidis 35' (pen.); Kouroupis (yellow card) 84'	Live TV: OTE Sport	Solferino 19', (yellow card) 75'; Toresani (yellow card) 41'; Biris (yellow card) 45'; Ikonomou (yellow card) 80'	Stadium: Kaftanzoglio Stadium; Referee: Ananias Fotiadis (Serres)

=== Promotion play-offs ===
==== Matches ====
9 April 2014 1	Iraklis	1–0	Fostiras	Thessaloniki
18:00 EEST	Savidis 62'; Papasterianos (yellow card) 65'; Pourtoulidis (yellow card) 80'	Live TV: OTE Sport	Achimastos (yellow card) 32' (yellow-red card) 67'; Gino (yellow card) 60'	Stadium: Kaftanzoglio Stadium; Referee: Christos Granas (Xanthi)

13 April 2014 2	Iraklis Psachna	2–1	Iraklis	Psachna
18:00 EEST	Kritikos 57'; Boumale 77', (yellow card) 78'	Live TV: OTE Sport	Savidis (yellow card) 50'; Pourtoulidis 76'	Stadium: Local Stadium of Psachna; Referee: Georgios Foukakis (Heraklion)

17 April 2014 3	Chania	3–0	Iraklis	Chania
15:30 EEST	Maragoudakis 13', 16', 35'; Poci (yellow card) 20'; Goumas (yellow card) 68'; Kostadinov (yellow card) 78'; Hadjiisaias (yellow card) 86'	Live TV:	Pourtoulidis (yellow card) 11'; Konteon (yellow card) 47' (yellow-red card) 69'	Stadium: Perivolia Municipal Stadium; Referee: Aristidis Vatsios (West Attica)

23 April 2014 4	Iraklis	0–0	Aiginiakos	Thessaloniki
15:30 EEST	Papasterianos (yellow card) 17'; Taianan (yellow card) 30'; Lima (yellow card) 54'; Savidis (yellow card) 68'; Zahora (yellow card) 72'	Live TV: OTE Sport	Manzano (yellow card) 24'; Fabinho (yellow card) 75' (yellow-red card) 77'	Stadium: Kaftanzoglio Stadium; Referee: Dionisios Zougras (Kozani)

27 April 2014 5	Olympiacos Volos	1–1	Iraklis	Volos
20:00 EEST	Savidis 15' (o.g.); Arvanitis (yellow card) 21' (yellow-red card) 27'; Katsiaros (yellow card) 87'; Cristóbal (penalty missed) 90+6'	Live TV: OTE Sport	Boukouvalas (yellow card) 13'; Pourtoulidis 28' (pen.); Savidis (yellow card) 38'; Intzoglou (yellow card) 63'; Konteon (yellow card) 73'; Siatravanis (yellow card) 80'; Kouroupis (yellow card) 90+4'	Stadium: Volos Municipal Stadium; Referee: Stefanos Mantakis (Imathia)

30 April 2014 6	Iraklis	1–1	Kerkyra	Thessaloniki
18:00 EEST	Kouroupis (yellow card) 28'; Kontodimos (yellow card) 28'; Pourtoulidis 56' (pen.); Papasterianos (yellow card) 79'	Live TV: OTE Sport	Zorbas (yellow card) 37'; Baldovaliev 45+1'; Paraskevaidis (yellow card) 70'; Marangos (yellow card) 85'; Gomes (yellow card) 87'	Stadium: Kaftanzoglio Stadium; Referee: Georgios Kyriazidis (Evros)

4 May 2014 7	Iraklis	1–0	Niki Volos	Thessaloniki
18:00 EEST	Zahora (yellow card) 45+1'; Papasterianos (yellow card) 48'; Siatravanis 60'; Matsoukas (red card) 81'	Live TV: OTE Sport	Akassou (yellow card) 23'; Añete (yellow card) 48'; Giotas (yellow card) 77'; Tzioras (yellow card) 81'	Stadium: Kaftanzoglio Stadium; Referee: Aristomenis Koutsiaftis (Arta)

7 May 2014 8	Fostiras	0–1	Iraklis	Tavros
18:00 EEST	Secholari (yellow card) 69'; Rougalas (yellow card) 90+3'	Live TV: OTE Sport	Savidis (yellow card) 44'; Scorza 58', (yellow card) 90+3'	Stadium: Spyros Gialampidis Stadium; Referee: Georgios Blanas (Messenia)

11 May 2014 9	Iraklis	1–1	Iraklis Psachna	Thessaloniki
15:00 EEST	Pourtoulidis (yellow card) 38'; Tsilianidis 39'; Intzoglou (yellow card) 43'; Papasterianos (yellow card) 68'	Live TV: OTE Sport	Ohandza 81'; V. Patsatzoglou (yellow card) 90+1'	Stadium: Kaftanzoglio Stadium; Referee: Andreas Pappas (Athens)

14 May 2014 10	Iraklis	0–0	Chania	Thessaloniki
19:30 EEST	Lima (yellow card) 75' (yellow-red card) 86'	Live TV: OTE Sport	Poci (yellow card) 29'; Manolas (yellow card) 45+2'; Kamplionis (yellow card) 88'	Stadium: Kaftanzoglio Stadium; Referee: Dimitriοs Styliaras (Aetolia-Acarnania)

20 May 2014 11	Aiginiakos	2–2	Iraklis	Aiginio
17:00 EEST	Georgiou (yellow card) 14'; Penta (yellow card) 60'; Konteon 62' (o.g.); Bellón (yellow card) 67'; Koutsospyros 87', (yellow card) 88'	Live TV: OTE Sport	Pourtoulidis (yellow card) 11' (yellow-red card) 48'; Taianan (yellow card) 38'; Boukouvalas (yellow card) 45+2'; Zourkos 45+3' (o.g.); Tsilianidis 65'; Huanderson (red card) 88'; Zahora (yellow card) 89'	Stadium: Municipal Stadium of Aiginio; Referee: Dimitrios Thanos (Grevena)

24 May 2014 12	Iraklis	0–1	Olympiacos Volos	Thessaloniki
18:00 EEST	Kontodimos (yellow card) 37'; Taianan (yellow card) 84'; Lima (yellow card) 85'	Live TV: OTE Sport	Katsikis 3'; Nikolias (yellow card) 30'; Rokas (yellow card) 71'	Stadium: Kaftanzoglio Stadium; Referee: Stavros Mantalos (Athens)

28 May 2014 13	Kerkyra	1–0	Iraklis	Kerkyra
18:00 EEST	Paraskevaidis (yellow card) 17'; Gomes 28' (pen.); Karagiannidis (yellow card) 90'	Live TV: OTE Sport	Boukouvalas (red card) 26'; Matsoukas (yellow card) 78'	Stadium: Kerkyra Stadium; Referee: Athanasios Giachos (Chios)

1 June 2014 14	Niki Volos	4–0	Iraklis	Volos
18:00 EEST	Tzioras 1'; Añete 11', 57'; Bitsakos (yellow card) 20'; Huanderson 63' (o.g.)	Live TV: OTE Sport	Tsilianidis (red card) 35'	Stadium: Panthessaliko Stadium; Referee: Christos Mitsios (Epirus)

== Greek Cup ==
=== First round ===
15 September 2013	Tyrnavos	1–1 (a.e.t.) (3–4 p)	Iraklis	Larissa
16:00 EEST	Kourtesiotis 44' (pen.); Datidis (yellow card) 50' (yellow-red card) 90+3'; Tellos (yellow card) 52' (yellow-red card) 69'; Rodrigo (yellow card) 61'; Sachinidis (yellow card) 74'; Vangeli (yellow card) 99'	Ρεπορτ; Live TV:	Brilakis (yellow card) 27' (yellow-red card) 59'; Papasterianos (yellow card) 67' (yellow-red card) 90+4'; Zahora (yellow card) 74'; Tsilianidis 90+6'	Stadium: Alcazar Stadium; Referee: Vangelis Gratsanis (Trikala)
	Penalties
	Rodrigo (penalty scored); André (penalty missed); Galitsios (penalty scored); Skoupras (penalty scored); Kourtesiotis (penalty missed)		(penalty scored) Pourtoulidis; (penalty scored) Boukouvalas; (penalty scored) Huanderson; (penalty scored) Lima

=== Second round ===
26 September 2013 First leg	Iraklis	1–0	Skoda Xanthi	Thessaloniki
15:30 EEST	Savidis (yellow card) 45'; Zahora 86'	Report; Live TV: OTE Sport	Goutas (yellow card) 22'; Baxevanidis (yellow card) 90'; Mantalos (yellow card) 90+3'	Stadium: Kaftanzoglio Stadium; Referee: Stavros Mantalos (Athens)

31 October 2013 Second leg	Skoda Xanthi	2–2 (2–3 agg.)	Iraklis	Xanthi
18:00 EET	Vasilakakis (yellow card) 22'; Mantalos 30', 33'; Baxevanidis (yellow card) 84'	Report; Live TV: OTE Sport	Savidis (yellow card) 41'; Siatravanis 78'; Kontodimos (yellow card) 80'; Lima (yellow card) 87'; Pourtoulidis 90'	Stadium: Skoda Xanthi Arena; Referee: Ioannis Delfakis (Arcadia)

=== Third round ===
9 January 2014 First leg	Iraklis	0–1	PAOK	Thessaloniki
20:00 EET	Taianan (yellow card) 25'; Kontodimos (yellow card) 39'; Savidis (yellow card) 85' (yellow-red card) 90+2'	Report; Live TV: OTE Sport	Athanasiadis 58', (yellow card) 65'; Kaçe (yellow card) 78'	Stadium: Kaftanzoglio Stadium; Referee: Aristomenis Koutsiaftis (Arta)

22 January 2014 Second leg	PAOK	5–1 (6–1 agg.)	Iraklis	Thessaloniki
17:00 EET	Kitsiou (yellow card) 17'; Athanasiadis 20', (yellow card) 21'; Stoch 22', 55', (yellow card) 26'; Tzavellas (yellow card) 73' (yellow-red card) 86'; Kaçe (yellow card) 78'; Oliseh 81'; Martens 90+3'	Report; Live TV: OTE Sport	Pourtoulidis 4'; Intzoglou (yellow card) 25'; Papasterianos (yellow card) 42'; Chionidis (yellow card) 76'; Zahora (yellow card) 78'	Stadium: Toumba Stadium; Referee: Apostolos Abarkiolis (Kavala)

== Statistics ==
=== Appearances and goals ===
No.	Pos	Nat	Player	Total		Football League		Greek Cup	
No.	Pos	Nat	Player	Apps	Goals	Apps	Goals	Apps	Goals
1	GK	(Brazil) BRA	Huanderson	22	0	20+0	0	2+0	0
2	DF	(Greece) GRE	Michalis Boukouvalas	38	1	33+1	1	4+0	0
3	DF	(Greece) GRE	Theofilos Kouroupis	6	0	4+2	0	0+0	0
4	DF	(Greece) GRE	Nikolaos Savidis	27	1	21+3	1	3+0	0
5	DF	(Greece) GRE	Stefanos Kragiopoulos	4	0	0+3	0	0+1	0
6	DF	(Greece) GRE	Angelos Papasterianos	30	0	27+1	0	2+0	0
9	FW	(Greece) GRE	Giorgos Chionidis	18	0	4+12	0	0+2	0
11	MF	(Greece) GRE	Nikos Pourtoulidis	43	9	35+3	7	4+1	2
12	MF	(Greece) GRE	Savvas Siatravanis	29	4	14+11	3	2+2	1
13	DF	(Greece) GRE	Petros Konteon	27	1	24+1	1	1+1	0
16	DF	(Greece) GRE	Panagiotis Kourdakis	9	0	0+9	0	0+0	0
18	MF	(Portugal) POR	Vitor Lima	33	0	28+1	0	4+0	0
20	FW	(Greece) GRE	Lefteris Matsoukas	30	0	13+12	0	2+3	0
21	DF	(Greece) GRE	Dimitris Kontodimos	42	0	37+0	0	5+0	0
22	MF	(Greece) GRE	Charalambos Sarafoglou	6	0	1+5	0	0+0	0
26	MF	(Ivory Coast) CIV	Hassoma Bino Bamba	24	0	18+3	0	3+0	0
27	FW	(Croatia) CRO	Dario Zahora	36	10	25+7	9	4+0	1
30	FW	(Uruguay) URU	Enzo Scorza	13	2	4+9	2	0+0	0
66	MF	(Greece) GRE	Giorgos Paligiorgos	10	0	1+9	0	0+0	0
71	GK	(Greece) GRE	Fotis Kipouros	11	0	8+0	0	3+0	0
86	GK	(Greece) GRE	Enea Koliqi	12	0	12+0	0	0+0	0
87	MF	(Brazil) BRA	Taianan	21	3	17+2	3	2+0	0
88	MF	(Greece) GRE	Lefteris Intzoglou	34	1	25+7	1	2+0	0
94	FW	(Greece) GRE	Kosmas Tsilianidis	39	7	28+6	6	3+2	1
95	MF	(Greece) GRE	Giorgos Apostolidis	4	0	1+3	0	0+0	0
99	FW	(Nigeria) NGR	Benjamin Onwuachi	28	3	21+2	3	3+2	0
–	MF	(Greece) GRE	Kyriakos Grammatikos	0	0	0+0	0	0+0	0
Players who left the club in-season
7	MF	(Greece) GRE	Tasos Kyriakos	10	2	7+0	2	3+0	0
8	MF	(Czech Republic) CZE	Marek Jarolím	10	3	5+3	3	1+1	0
14	MF	(Greece) GRE	Alexandros Natsiopoulos	0	0	0+0	0	0+0	0
15	DF	(Albania) ALB	Artan Thorja	0	0	0+0	0	0+0	0
17	MF	(Greece) GRE	Paschalis Voutsias	2	0	0+2	0	0+0	0
19	DF	(Greece) GRE	Charalampos Brilakis	9	1	7+0	1	2+0	0
23	DF	(Greece) GRE	Stratos Chintzidis	0	0	0+0	0	0+0	0
25	DF	(Greece) GRE	Dimitrios Tserkezos	0	0	0+0	0	0+0	0
33	GK	(Greece) GRE	Panagiotis Vosniadis	0	0	0+0	0	0+0	0

Last updated: 1 June 2014
Source: Match reports in Competitive matches

=== Top scorers ===
Includes all competitive matches. The list is sorted by shirt number when total goals are equal.

R	No.	Pos	Nat	Name	Football League	Greek Cup	Total
1	27	FW	(Croatia)	Dario Zahora	9	1	10
2	11	MF	(Greece)	Nikos Pourtoulidis	7	2	9
3	94	FW	(Greece)	Kosmas Tsilianidis	6	1	7
4	12	MF	(Greece)	Savvas Siatravanis	3	1	4
5	8	MF	(Czech Republic)	Marek Jarolím	3	0	3
=	87	MF	(Brazil)	Taianan	3	0	3
=	99	FW	(Nigeria)	Benjamin Onwuachi	3	0	3
8	7	MF	(Greece)	Tasos Kyriakos	2	0	2
=	30	FW	(Uruguay)	Enzo Scorza	2	0	2
10	2	DF	(Greece)	Michalis Boukouvalas	1	0	1
=	4	DF	(Greece)	Nikolaos Savidis	1	0	1
=	13	DF	(Greece)	Petros Konteon	1	0	1
=	19	DF	(Greece)	Charalampos Brilakis	1	0	1
=	88	MF	(Greece)	Lefteris Intzoglou	1	0	1
				Own Goals	2	0	2
				TOTAL	45	5	50

=== Top assists ===
Includes all competitive matches. The list is sorted by shirt number when total assists are equal.

R	No.	Pos	Nat	Name	Football League	Greek Cup	Total
1	21	DF	(Greece)	Dimitris Kontodimos	7	0	7
2	99	FW	(Nigeria)	Benjamin Onwuachi	4	0	4
3	11	MF	(Greece)	Nikos Pourtoulidis	3	0	3
=	27	FW	(Croatia)	Dario Zahora	3	0	3
=	87	MF	(Brazil)	Taianan	3	0	3
=	94	FW	(Greece)	Kosmas Tsilianidis	0	3	3
7	7	MF	(Greece)	Τasos Kyriakos	2	0	2
=	12	MF	(Greece)	Savvas Siatravanis	2	0	2
9	2	DF	(Greece)	Michalis Boukouvalas	1	0	1
=	5	DF	(Greece)	Stefanos Kragiopoulos	0	1	1
=	9	FW	(Greece)	Giorgos Chionidis	1	0	1
=	18	MF	(Portugal)	Vitor Lima	1	0	1
=	26	MF	(Ivory Coast)	Hassoma Bino Bamba	1	0	1
=	88	MF	(Greece)	Lefteris Intzoglou	1	0	1
				TOTAL	29	4	33

=== Disciplinary record ===
Includes all competitive matches. The list is sorted by shirt number when total cards are equal.

R	No.	Pos	Nat	Name	Football League			Greek Cup			Total		
R	No.	Pos	Nat	Name	Yellow card	(yellow card) (yellow-red card)	Red card	Yellow card	(yellow card) (yellow-red card)	Red card	Yellow card	(yellow card) (yellow-red card)	Red card
1	6	DF	(Greece)	Angelos Papasterianos	0	0	1	0	1	0	0	1	1
2	19	DF	(Greece)	Charalampos Brilakis	0	0	0	0	1	0	0	1	0
3	2	DF	(Greece)	Michalis Boukouvalas	2	0	0	0	0	0	2	0	0
=	26	MF	(Ivory Coast)	Hassoma Bino Bamba	2	0	0	0	0	0	2	0	0
4	4	DF	(Greece)	Nikolaos Savidis	0	0	0	1	0	0	1	0	0
=	20	FW	(Greece)	Lefteris Matsoukas	1	0	0	0	0	0	1	0	0
=	27	FW	(Croatia)	Dario Zahora	0	0	0	1	0	0	1	0	0
=	88	MF	(Greece)	Lefteris Intzoglou	1	0	0	0	0	0	1	0	0
=	99	FW	(Nigeria)	Benjamin Onwuachi	1	0	0	0	0	0	1	0	0
				TOTAL	7	0	1	2	2	0	9	2	1

== See also ==
- Iraklis F.C. (Thessaloniki)
- List of Iraklis Thessaloniki F.C. players
- List of Iraklis F.C. seasons
- G.S. Iraklis Thessaloniki
- G.S. Iraklis Thessaloniki (men's basketball)
- Iraklis B.C. in international competitions
- G.S. Iraklis Thessaloniki (women's basketball)
- Ivanofeio Sports Arena
- G.S. Iraklis Thessaloniki (men's volleyball)
- G.S. Iraklis Thessaloniki (women's volleyball)
- G.S. Iraklis Thessaloniki (water polo)
- G.S. Iraklis Thessaloniki (rugby)
