= Manzano =

Manzano is a Spanish word used for apple trees, and is also used as a patronymic name. Manzano may refer to:

== Places ==
- El Manzano, a village in Spain
- Manzano, Italy, a municipality in Italy
- Manzano, New Mexico, a town in New Mexico, USA
- the Manzano Mountains in New Mexico, USA
  - Manzano Peak, the highest peak in the Manzano Mountains
- Manzano Amargo, a municipality in Argentina
- Manzano Springs, a census-designated place in New Mexico, USA
- Arroyo Manzano, a neighbourhood of Santo Domingo, Dominican Republic
- Cuyín Manzano, a municipality in Argentina
- Salinas del Manzano, a municipality in Spain

== People ==
- Maria Rosa Calvo-Manzano, Spanish musician
- Alberto Manzano, Cuban pole-vaulter
- Andi Manzano, Philippine disk jockey
- Edu Manzano, Philippine actor and politician
- Eduardo Manzano, Mexican actor
- Ezequiel Manzano, Argentine-Italian footballer
- Fabián Manzano, Chilean footballer
- Gregorio Manzano, Spanish football coach
- Ignacio Urrutia Manzano, Chilean politician
- Javier Manzano, Mexican photographer
- Javier Manzano Salazar, Mexican politician
- Jesús Manzano, Spanish cyclist
- Jesús Gil Manzano, Spanish football referee
- José Luis Manzano, Argentine businessman and politician
- José María Álvarez del Manzano, Spanish politician
- Juan Francisco Manzano, Cuban writer
- Juan Pío Manzano, Mexican politician
- Leonel Manzano, American track and field athlete, born in Mexico
- Luis Manzano, Philippine actor and television host
- María Manzano, Spanish mathematical logician
- Matías Manzano, Argentine footballer
- Mauricio Manzano, Salvadoran footballer
- Miguel Manzano, Mexican actor
- Miriam Manzano, Australian figure skater
- Rafael Manzano Martos, Spanish architect
- Renato De Manzano, Italian footballer
- René Gómez Manzano, Cuban political activist
- Sofia Manzano, Brazilian politician
- Sonia Manzano, American actress and writer
- Virginia Manzano, Mexican actress
- Yasek Manzano Silva, Cuban trumpet player
- Daniel, Fabian and Alejandro Manzano, American musicians, brothers and members of the band Boyce Avenue

== Other ==
- Manzano High School, a public school in Albuquerque, New Mexico
- Jose Lopez Manzano Tuy National High School, a public school in the Philippines
- El Manzano prison, Chile
- Manzano pepper or Capsicum pubescens, a species of the genus Capsicum, primarily in Central and South America
