= Matsoukas =

Matsoukas (Greek: Ματσούκας) is a Greek surname. Notable people with the surname include:

- Lefteris Matsoukas (born 1990), Greek footballer
- Melina Matsoukas (born 1981), American music video director
