= Kosmas Tsilianidis =

Greek coach and retired association football player (born 1994)

Personal information
- Date of birth: 9 May 1994 (age 32)
- Place of birth: Thessaloniki, Greece
- Height: 1.80 m (5 ft 11 in)
- Position: Winger

Team information
- Current team: Athens Kallithea (assistant)

Youth career
- 1998–2005: Achilleas Triandrias
- 2005–2011: Iraklis

Senior career*
Years	Team	Apps	(Gls)
2011–2016	Iraklis	96	(11)
2013	→ Eginiakos (loan)	11	(3)
2016–2019	Asteras Tripolis	86	(8)
2019–2023	OFI	60	(9)
2023–2024	Lamia	6	(0)
Total		259	(31)

International career^{‡}
2009–2010	Greece U17	1	(0)
2015–2016	Greece U21	9	(1)

Managerial career
- 2025–2026: Iraklis U17
- 2026–: Athens Kallithea (assistant)
- * Club domestic league appearances and goals as of August 21, 2025 ‡ National team caps and goals as of April 7, 2017

Kosmas Tsilianidis (Greek: Κοσμάς Τσιλιανίδης; born 9 May 1994) is a Greek former professional football player who played as a winger. He is the current assistant manager of Athens Kallithea.

== Club career ==
=== Early career ===
Tsilianidis began playing football for Achilleas Triandrias. After a year having scored a number of goals, Tsilianidis was noticed by Iraklis and in April 2005 was transferred to the youth ranks of the club. He has won many MVP awards in various tournaments. In 2011, he was on trial in Fulham.

=== Iraklis ===
Tsilianidis was a member of the squad of Iraklis which took part in the regional championship of Delta Ethniki in the 2011–12 season, after the club was expelled from the professional leagues. He made his first team debut in Iraklis' away draw against Nea Kallikrateia F.C. He has also scored his only goal for the club to date in a home win against Apollon Arneas. After the merger of the team with Pontioi Katerinis, Tsilianidis was introduced in the merged club's squad and made his professional debut for Iraklis in a home win against Aetos Skydras.

==== Loan to Eginiakos ====
Tsilianidis was loaned out to Eginiakos during the 2013 winter transfer window. He debuted for Egianiakos in an away draw against Kassiopi and scored his first goal in a home draw against Odysseas Kordeliou.

==== Return to Iraklis ====
Tsilianidis returned to Iraklis after his loan period ended.

For his performance in the 2013–14 season, he was named as Football League North Group's best young player.

=== Asteras Tripolis ===
On 28 July 2016, Tsilianidis signed a three-year contract with Super League club Asteras Tripolis for an undisclosed fee. On 3 February 2018, he opened the score in a 1–1 home draw game against Xanthi. It was his first goal with the club in the Super League. On 22 April 2018, he scored in a crucial 3–1 away win against Kerkyra, keeping his team alive in the battle for a Europa League place.

On 2 August 2018, the Greek winger scored his first goal in UEFA competitions, equalizing the score in a 1–1 home draw against Hibernian. This goal however, was not enough to help the team proceed to the next qualifying round of the Europa League, as the team lost 4–3 on aggregate. On 18 December 2018, he scored in a 4–0 away win against Apollon Paralimnio in the Greek Cup.

On 9 January 2019, he scored with a stunning free-kick in a 3–2 away loss against Larissa in the Greek Cup round of 16. On 21 April 2019, he scored with a close header in an important 1–1 away draw against O.F.I., in the battle to avoid relegation. This was also his first league goal for the 2018–19 season.

=== OFI ===
On 19 June 2019, Tsilianidis signed a three-year contract with O.F.I. on a free transfer. On 31 August 2019, he scored his first goal for the club in an emphatic 3–1 away win against Panathinaikos. On 14 September 2019, he scored a brace in a 3–1 home win game against Panetolikos.

On 6 October 2019, Tsilianidis netted another one in a triumphant 4–1 home win against Panionios. On 3 November 2019, he scored in a 3–2 away defeat against Larissa, despite an early two-goal advantage. On 4 December 2019, he had a goal and an assist in a 4–0 home win against Kavala for the Greek Cup. This win overturned the two-goal disadvantage from the first leg and helped his team qualify for the round of 16.

On 18 January 2020, he was the MVP of a 2–1 away win against Panionios, scoring one goal and giving one assist. On 28 May 2020, the 26-year-old player suffered a ruptured anterior cruciate ligament and a partial rupture through a lateral ligament, as it emerged after an imaging test was performed. The Greek striker had an excellent season with the club, having 7 goals and 8 assists in 26 appearances in Super League and the Greek Cup. The rehabilitation period is estimated to six months. After a very difficult period for the striker marred by injury (200 days to be exact), Tsilianidis returned to the squad in a home game against Aris Thessaloniki on 19 December 2020. On 24 March 2021, Kosmas Tsilianidis underwent diagnostic arthroscopy on the knee of his right foot and is expected to return in 2–4 weeks. In April 2021 he faced a torn meniscus and he would return to action after six months.

== International career ==
Tsilianidis has been capped for Greece U-17. On 29 March 2015, he debuted for Greece U-21 in a 0–2 home defeat against Croatia U-21.

== Career statistics ==
=== Club ===
As of 12 November 2025

Club	Season	League			Greek Cup		Continental		Total	
Club	Season	Division	Apps	Goals	Apps	Goals	Apps	Goals	Apps	Goals
Eginiakos (loan)	2012–13	Gamma Ethniki	14	3	0	0	—		14	3
Iraklis	2013–14	Football League	35	6	5	1	—		40	7
Iraklis	2014–15	Football League	26	3	6	0	—		32	3
Iraklis	2015–16	Super League Greece	18	1	6	0	—		24	1
Iraklis	Total		79	10	17	1	—		96	11
Asteras Tripolis	2016–17	Super League Greece	22	0	6	2	—		28	2
Asteras Tripolis	2017–18	Super League Greece	22	2	2	0	—		24	2
Asteras Tripolis	2018–19	Super League Greece	23	1	9	2	2	1	34	4
Asteras Tripolis	Total		67	3	17	4	2	1	86	8
OFI	2019–20	Super League Greece	23	6	3	1	—		26	7
OFI	2020–21	Super League Greece	5	0	1	0	—		6	0
OFI	2021–22	Super League Greece	21	2	2	0	—		23	2
OFI	Total		37	7	6	1	0	0	433	8
Career total			197	23	40	6	2	1	39	30
