= Manzo =

Manzo is a name (used usually as a surname) that may refer to:

- Andrea Manzo (born 1961), Italian football manager and former midfielder
- Anthony George Manzo (born 1958), elected Senator for the Taraba North constituency in Nigeria
- Armando Manzo (born 1958), retired Mexican footballer
- Carlos Manzo (1985–2025), Mexican politician
- Carlos Reyes-Manzo (born 1944), Chilean documentary photographer and poet
- Caroline Manzo (born 1961), American television personality, entrepreneur and radio show host
- Dina Manzo, American reality television personality and Caroline Manzo's sister
- Frank Manzo, member of the Lucchese crime family
- Louis Manzo (born 1955), American politician in the New Jersey General Assembly
- Manuel Manzo (born 1952), former footballer
- Michael Manzo, former chief of staff for Pennsylvania House of Representatives Majority Leader H. William DeWeese
- Reynaldo Valdés Manzo (born 1950), Mexican politician affiliated to the Party of the Democratic Revolution
- Rodulfo Manzo (born 1949), retired professional football defender from Peru
- Terukuni Manzo (1919–1977), sumo wrestler from Ogachi, Akita Prefecture, Japan

First name:

- Manzo Iwata (1924–1993), Japanese martial artist
- Manzo Nagano (1855–1923), the first Japanese person to officially immigrate to Canada
- Manzō Wowari (born 1948), Japanese actor and voice actor from Aichi Prefecture

== See also ==
- Manzo-Village Person character from the Film Seven Samurai, played by Kamatari Fujiwara
- Manz
- Manzano (disambiguation)
- Manzoni (disambiguation)
- Manzonia
- Mwanzo
