= Lukáš Jarolím =

Czech footballer

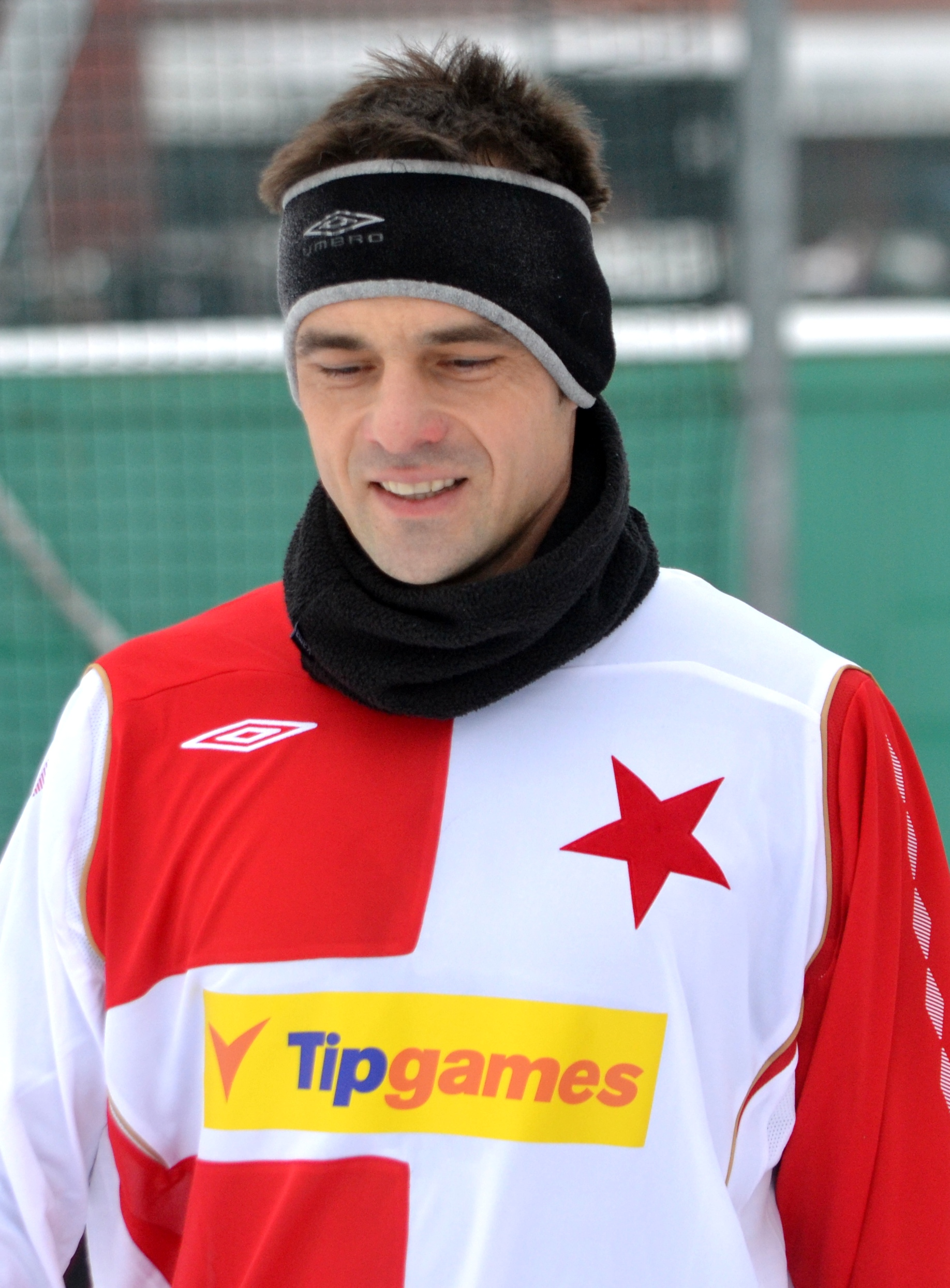
- Jarolím in 2014

Personal information
- Date of birth: 29 July 1976 (age 50)
- Place of birth: Pardubice, Czechoslovakia
- Height: 1.76 m (5 ft 9 in)
- Position: Midfielder

Youth career
- 1982–1987: Slavia Prague
- 1987–1990: Rouen
- 1990–1991: Amiens
- 1991–1994: Slavia Prague

Senior career*
Years	Team	Apps	(Gls)
1994–1997	Slavia Prague	20	(1)
1996	→ FC Union Cheb (loan)	5	(0)
1997	→ České Budějovice (loan)	3	(0)
1997–2002	Marila Příbram	132	(15)
1998	→ Mladá Boleslav (loan)		
2003	Sedan	25	(0)
2004	Greuther Fürth	6	(0)
2004–2005	Slovácko	29	(2)
2005–2007	Slavia Prague	57	(9)
2007–2010	Siena	64	(1)
2010–2013	Slavia Prague	25	(4)
2013	České Budějovice	10	(1)

International career
1994	Czech Republic U18	1	(0)
1996	Czech Republic U21	2	(0)
Medal record
SK Slavia Prague
Winner	Czech First League	1995–96
- * Club domestic league appearances and goals

Lukáš Jarolím (born 29 July 1976) is a Czech former professional footballer who played as a midfielder.

== Personal life ==
Jarolím is the son of Karel Jarolím, brother of David Jarolím and cousin of Marek Jarolím.

He was born in Pardubice where his father played for their local club.

== Career ==
Jarolím started his career at youth ranks of Slavia Prague, where his father was playing for the first team. He then followed his father to join two French clubs, and then back to Slavia Prague in 1990.

He was loaned to FC Union Cheb and Dynamo České Budějovice for the 1996–97 season.

He played his last game for Slavia Prague at the start of the season, and then moved to Marila Příbram.

He played for Marila Příbram until January 2003; then he joined Ligue 1 club Sedan. He followed to club to Ligue 2 and played the first half of the 2003–04 season, and then moved again to 2. Bundesliga, playing for Greuther Fürth.

He moved back to Czech First League to Slovácko, before he rejoined Slavia Prague in 2005; both clubs were coached by his father. He played for the club for two more seasons, also becoming team captain, before moving to Siena on free transfer in 2007, on a two-year contract.

He joined Slavia once more in 2010 and became club captain in 2011 following the departure of Karol Kisel.
