= Petros Konteon =

Greek footballer

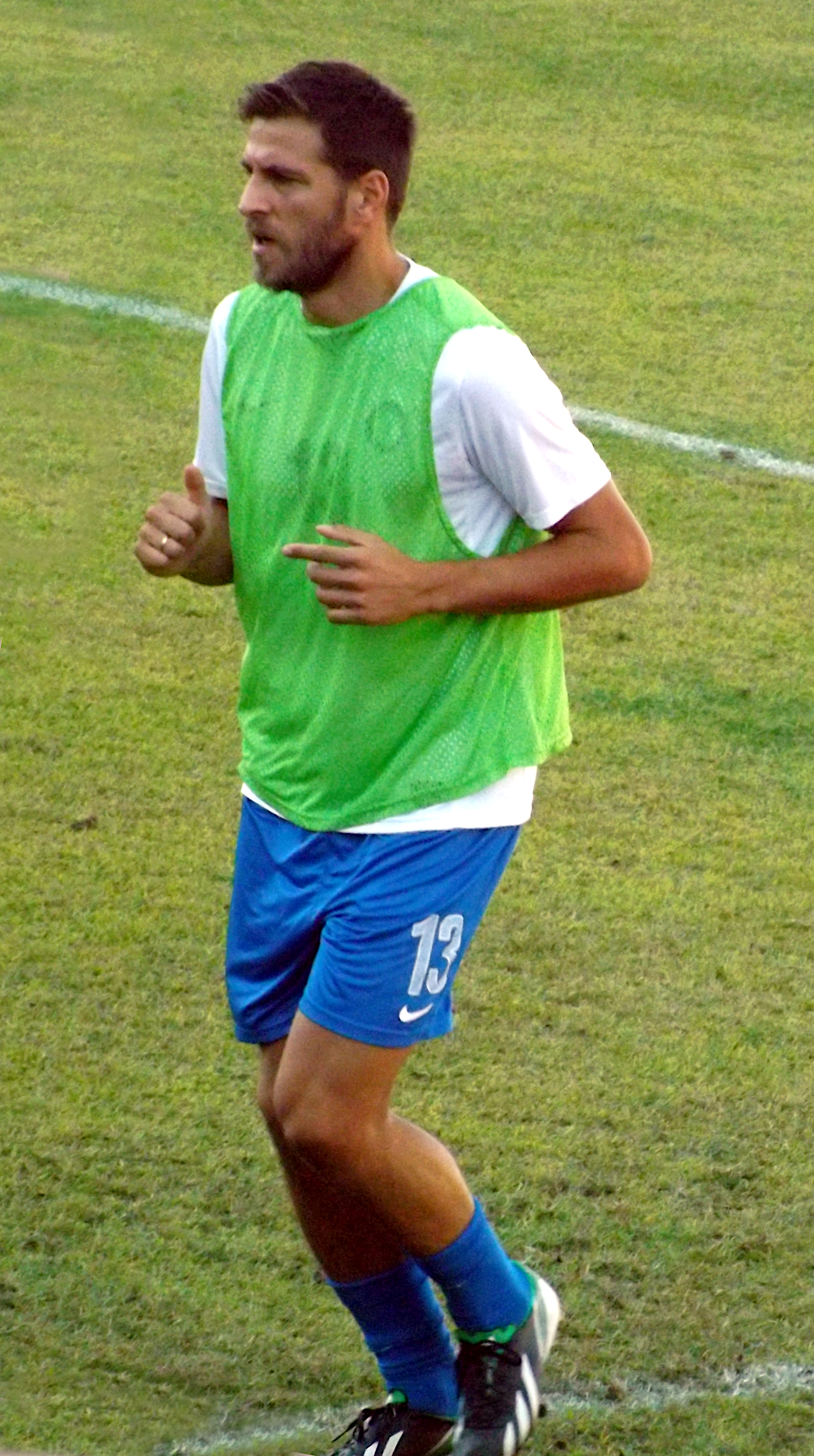
- Konteon warming up for Iraklis in 2013

Personal information
- Full name: Petros Konteon
- Date of birth: 9 May 1984 (age 42)
- Place of birth: Thessaloniki, Greece
- Height: 1.88 m (6 ft 2 in)
- Positions: Defender; midfielder

Youth career
- –2002: PAOK

Senior career*
Years	Team	Apps	(Gls)
2002–2005	PAOK	7	(0)
2004–2005	→ Niki Volos (loan)	25	(7)
2006	Panserraikos	9	(0)
2006–2007	Diagoras	25	(2)
2007–2009	Olympiacos Volos	32	(2)
2010–2012	Pierikos	66	(9)
2012–2013	Doxa Drama	30	(1)
2013–2014	Iraklis	25	(1)
2014–2015	Chania	18	(3)
2015	PAS Lamia	10	(1)
2016	Panargiakos		
2016–2018	APE Langada		
2018–2020	Foinikas Polichni		
2020–2021	Iraklis	7	(0)
2021–2022	Iraklis Ampelokipi		
- * Club domestic league appearances and goals as of 26 October 2020

Petros Konteon (Greek: Πέτρος Κοντέων; born 9 May 1984) is a Greek former footballer who played as a defender. He started his career with PAOK. He also had spells with Niki Volos, Panserraikos, Diagoras, Olympiacos Volos, Pierikos, Doxa Drama and Iraklis.

== Career ==
Konteon was brought up from the academies of PAOK and started his professional career for PAOK in 2002. While in PAOK he was loaned out to Niki Volos, where he spent the 2004–2005 season. On 24 January 2006 Konteon signed for Panserraikos for 1.5 years, finally staying for a mere six months. After leaving Panserraikos he joined Diagoras for the 2006-07 season. In 2007, he signed for Olympiacos Volos from which he was released during the 2009 winter transfer window. He signed for Pierikos during the 2010 winter transfer window, where he spent 2.5 years making a total of 66 appearances for the club and scoring nine times.

In the summer of 2012 he reached an agreement with Doxa Drama with which he spent the 2012-13 season. He was released from Doxa in the summer of 2013. On 15 July 2013 he signed an annual contract with Greek Football League club Iraklis. He made his debut for his new club in an away 1–0 loss against Vataniakos. He managed to score his first goal for the club in a 2–1 home win against Aiginiakos. He finished the season appearing in 25 matches and scoring 1 goal. On 11 July 2014 he signed for Chania.
