= Tiago Jonas =

Portuguese footballer

Personal information
- Full name: Tiago Jonas Ferraz Rodrigues
- Date of birth: 1 December 1983 (age 42)
- Place of birth: Porto, Portugal
- Height: 1.85 m (6 ft 1 in)
- Position: Centre-back

Youth career
- 1993–1997: Porto
- 1997–2002: Infesta

Senior career*
Years	Team	Apps	(Gls)
2002–2005	Infesta	60	(4)
2005–2007	Falkirk	32	(0)
2008–2009	Cinfães	35	(3)
2009–2011	Académico Viseu	57	(6)
2011	Infesta	3	(0)
2011–2012	Cinfães	4	(0)
2012–2013	Infesta	18	(1)
Total		209	(14)
- * Club domestic league appearances and goals

Tiago Jonas Ferraz Rodrigues (born 1 December 1983), known as Jonas, is a Portuguese former professional footballer who played as a central defender.

== Club career ==
Jonas was born in Porto. In his country, he never competed in higher than the third division. On 15 June 2005, the free agent joined Scottish Premier League side Falkirk alongside his compatriot Vítor Lima, being discovered by the club's player-coach Russell Latapy who had spent several seasons in Portugal as a player. He made his official debut on 6 August, playing the full 90 minutes in a 2–0 away win against Livingston.

On 29 May 2006, Jonas was awarded a new one-year contract with the Bairns, having taken part in 37 competitive games in his first season. He would never appear, however, for the first team again, leaving in December 2007 and returning to Portugal.
