= Karel Jarolím =

Czech footballer (born 1956)

Personal information
- Date of birth: 23 August 1956 (age 70)
- Place of birth: Čáslav, Czechoslovakia
- Position: Midfielder

Youth career
- 1965–1971: TJ Spartak Třemošnice
- 1971: TJ Spartak Žleby
- 1971: TJ VCHZ Pardubice

Senior career*
Years	Team	Apps	(Gls)
1971–1977	VCHZ Pardubice		
1977–1978	Slavia Prague		
1978–1979	Dukla Prague		
1979–1980	Dukla Tábor		
1980–1987	Slavia Prague	215	(48)
1987–1990	Rouen	79	(13)
1990–1991	Amiens	27	(13)
1991–1992	Slavia Prague	28	(4)
1992	Viktoria Žižkov		
1993–1994	Švarc Benešov		
1994–1995	FC Bohemians Praha	23	(10)

International career
1982–1987	Czechoslovakia	13	(2)

Managerial career
- 1997–1998: Dukla Příbram
- 2000–2001: Slavia Prague
- 2001–2003: Racing Strasbourg (Assistant)
- 2003–2005: 1. FC Slovácko
- 2005–2010: Slavia Prague
- 2010: Slavia Prague
- 2010–2011: Slovan Bratislava
- 2011–2013: Al-Ahli
- 2013: Al-Wahda
- 2014–2016: Mladá Boleslav
- 2016–2018: Czech Republic
- 2020–2022: Mladá Boleslav
- * Club domestic league appearances and goals

Karel Jarolím (born 23 August 1956) is a Czech football coach and former player. As a player, he played as a midfielder, making 275 appearances in the Czechoslovak First League. and representing the Czechoslovakia national team internationally.

== Career ==
Jarolím has been coach of Slavia Prague three times in the 2000–01 Czech First League and from 2005 to 2010, until he returned for a few matches afterwards.

Jarolím was coach of Jeddah-based Al-Ahli Saudi Professional League. Al-Ahli were runners-up in 2012 AFC Champions League final. In May 2013, he signed with Al Wahda for a season. He returned to the Czech Republic in January 2014, signing with FK Mladá Boleslav.

On 15 July 2016, Jarolím was hired as manager of Czech Republic national team. He was sacked on 11 September 2018 after a 5–1 defeat against Russia a day earlier, which was then the highest defeat in the history of the Czech Republic national team.

== Personal life ==
His sons Lukáš and David are also footballers, as well his nephew Marek.

== Honours ==
=== As a player ===
- Dukla Prague: 1978–79 Czechoslovak First League
- Slavia Prague
  - Intercup: 1986, 1992

=== Managerial ===
- Slovácko: 2004–05 Czech Cup runner-up
- Slavia Prague: Czech First League: 2007–08, 2008–09
- Slovan Bratislava: 2010–11 Slovak Superliga, 2010–11 Slovak Cup Final
- Al-Ahli: 2012 King Cup of Champions, 2011–12 Saudi Professional League runner-up, 2012 AFC Champions League runner-up
- FK Mladá Boleslav: 2015–16 Czech Cup

=== Individual ===
- Czech Coach of the Year (Rudolf Vytlačil Award): 2008, 2009
- Czech Coach of the Year: 2008

== Managerial statistics ==
As of 28 February 2021

Team	From	To	Record							
Team	From	To	G	W	D	L	GF	GA	GD	Win %
Slavia Prague	13 April 2005	30 March 2010	214	101	60	53	321	217	+104	47.20
Slavia Prague	1 June 2010	29 September 2010	11	3	4	4	11	15	−4	27.27
Slovan Bratislava	13 October 2010	5 August 2011	35	21	11	3	62	26	+36	60.00
Mladá Boleslav	3 January 2014	9 August 2016	101	52	23	26	176	114	+62	51.49
Czech Republic	1 August 2016	18 September 2018	22	10	4	8	35	28	+7	45.45
Mladá Boleslav	8 December 2020	Present	10	1	4	5	11	17	−6	10.00
Career totals			393	188	106	99	616	417	+199	47.84
