= Georgios Apostolidis (footballer) =

Greek footballer (born in 1995)

Personal information
- Date of birth: 22 June 1995 (age 31)
- Place of birth: Thessaloniki, Greece
- Height: 1.71 m (5 ft 7 in)
- Position: Left winger

Team information
- Current team: Kozani
- Number: 11

Youth career
- PAOK
- –2013: Iraklis

Senior career*
Years	Team	Apps	(Gls)
2013–2014	Iraklis	4	(0)
2014	Kampaniakos	7	(0)
2015	Real Avilés		
2015	Niki Volos	2	(0)
2016	Pierikos	15	(2)
2016–2017	Ermionida	21	(10)
2017–2018	Kissamikos	25	(3)
2018–2019	Kerkyra	9	(2)
2019–2020	Doxa Drama	10	(0)
2020–2021	Ierapetra	8	(1)
2021–2022	Irodotos	24	(2)
2022–	Kozani	20	(1)
- * Club domestic league appearances and goals as of 14 November 2022

Georgios Apostolidis (Greek: Γεώργιος Αποστολίδης; born 22 June 1995) is a Greek professional footballer who plays as a left winger for Super League 2 club Kozani.

== Career ==
Apostolidis started his football career in the academies of PAOK, before moving to city rivals' Iraklis youth system. A string of good performances with Iraklis' U–20 team earned him his first professional contract with the side. He made his debut for Iraklis, coming on as a late substitute for Benjamin Onwuachi, in a 2–1 home win against Aiginiakos. In the summer of 2014, after being released from Iraklis, he signed for Football League 2 club Kampaniakos.
