= Nikos Pourtoulidis =

Greek executive, coach and retired association football player (born 1983)

Personal information
- Full name: Nikolaos Pourtoulidis
- Date of birth: 7 October 1983 (age 43)
- Place of birth: Nea Karvali, Greece
- Height: 1.68 m (5 ft 6 in)
- Position: Central midfielder

Team information
- Current team: Iraklis youth academy (sporting director)

Youth career
- –2002: Nea Karvali

Senior career*
Years	Team	Apps	(Gls)
2002–2006	AEK Athens	0	(0)
2004–2006	→ Thrasyvoulos (loan)	69	(13)
2006–2008	Asteras Tripolis	23	(0)
2008	Ilisiakos	22	(0)
2008–2010	Kalamata	58	(3)
2010–2012	Pierikos	58	(1)
2012–2013	Niki Volos	37	(7)
2013–2016	Iraklis	81	(12)
2016–2017	Apollon Smyrnis	7	(0)
2017–2018	OFI	33	(2)
2018–2020	Apollon Kalamarias	32	(4)
2020–2021	Iraklis	6	(5)

Managerial career
- 2024–2025: Iraklis U6–U7–U8
- 2025–: Iraklis youth academy (sporting director)
- * Club domestic league appearances and goals as of August 21, 2025

Nikos Pourtoulidis (Greek: Νίκος Πουρτουλίδης; born 7 October 1983) is a Greek retired professional association football player, who played as a central midfielder, and coach. He is the current sporting director of Iraklis youth academy.

== Club career ==
Pourtoulidis started his career at Nea Karvali. On 10 June 2002 he signed his first professional contract at AEK Athens. After one and a half season at the club he only appeared for the club in 4 Cup matches. On 19 January 2004 he was loaned out to Thrasyvoulos. On 17 June 2005 his loan to the team of Fyli was renewed for another season. He stayed with Thrasyvoulos for two and a half years in total scoring 69 appearances and 13 goals. In the summer of 2006 his contract with AEK expired and Pourtoulidis signed for Asteras Tripolis in the Greek Super League. Pourtoulidis signed for Kalamata in 2008.

In June 2010 he signed an annual contract for Pierikos. Although he suffered a torn cruciate ligament ending the 2010–11 season, he signed a contract extension for one more year. On 27 August 2012 Pourtoulidis signed for Niki Volos. In 2013, he signed for Football League club Iraklis. He made his league debut for Iraklis in an away match against Kavala. He scored his first goal for the club to help the club achieve a 3–1 home win against Anagennisi Karditsa. For his performance in the season, he was named as Football League North Group's best player.

On 15 July 2016, he signed a year contract with Apollon Smyrnis for an undisclosed fee. On 30 January 2017, after the arrival of Christian Obodo, Portoulidis left the club by mutual consent. A day later, he signed with Football League club OFI, aiming to help the club to be promoted to the Super League.

== Honours ==
Asteras Tripolis

- Beta Ethniki: 2006–07
