= Dimitrios Kontodimos =

Greek footballer

Personal information
- Full name: Dimitrios Kontodimos
- Date of birth: 21 April 1982 (age 44)
- Place of birth: Larissa, Greece
- Height: 1.78 m (5 ft 10 in)
- Position: Left full back

Senior career*
Years	Team	Apps	(Gls)
2000–2004	AEL	101	(12)
2004–2008	Skoda Xanthi	42	(0)
2005–2006	→ Panionios (loan)	10	(0)
2008–2009	Apollon Kalamarias	16	(0)
2009–2013	Kerkyra	105	(1)
2013	Niki Volos	27	(0)
2013–2014	Iraklis	37	(0)
2014–2015	AEL	26	(1)
2015	Panachaiki	6	(0)
2016	Trikala	9	(0)
2016–2017	SSV Elektra		
2017	TSV Kornburg	18	(0)
2018	SSV Elektra		

International career
2003	Greece U18	4	(0)
2004	Greece Olympic	0	(0)
- * Club domestic league appearances and goals

Dimitrios Kontodimos (Greek: Δημήτριος Κοντοδήμος; born 21 April 1982) is a Greek former professional football player who played as a Left fullback.

== Career ==
On 5 July 2013 he signed for Greek Football League club Iraklis. He made his debut for his new club in an away 3–2 loss against Kavala. On July 9, 2014, he signed a one-year contract with his hometown club AEL.
