= Manzano Amargo =

- Municipality and village
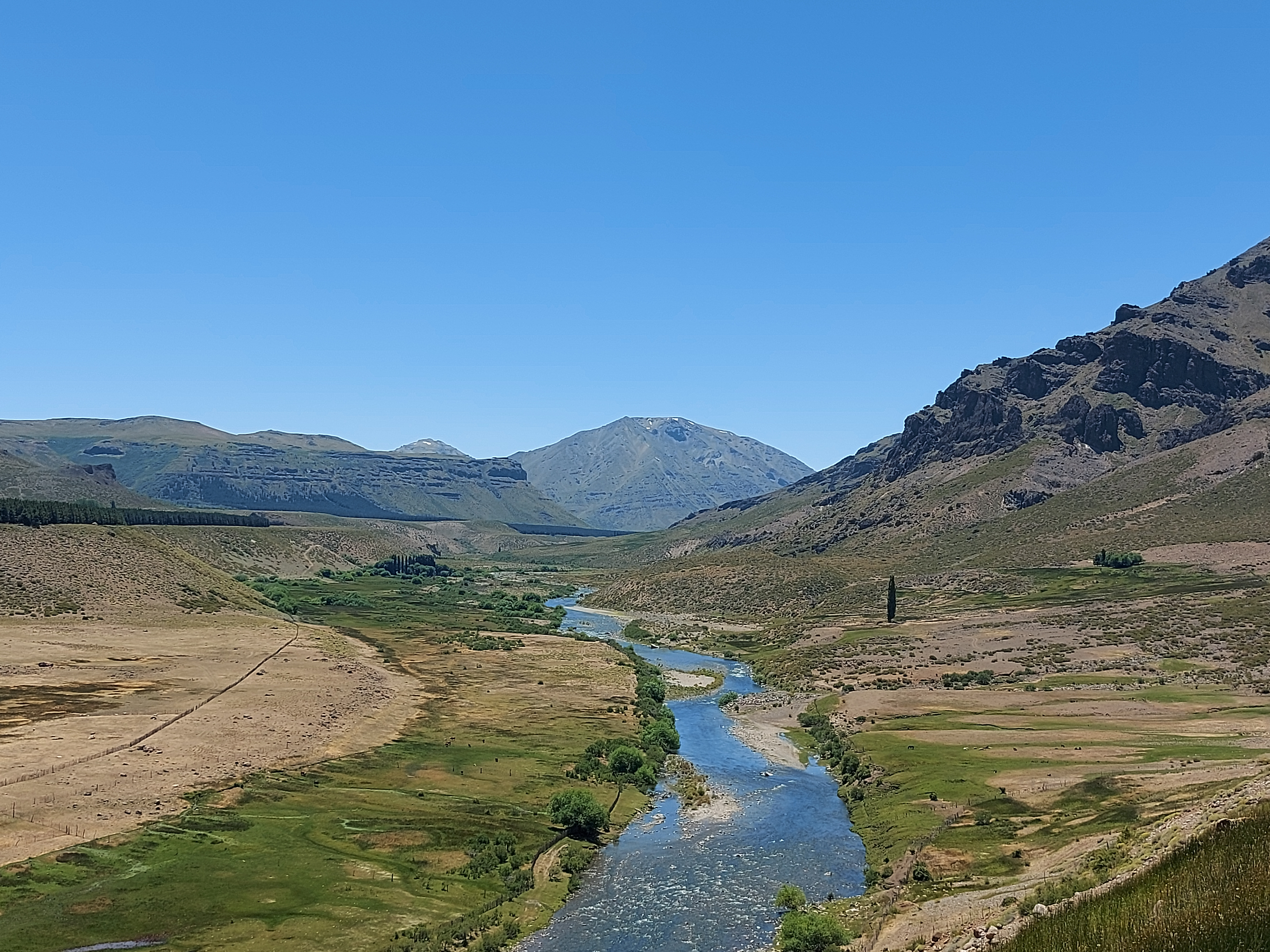
- The Neuquén River in Manzano Amargo

- Location within Neuquén Province Location within Argentina
- Coordinates: 36°45′18″S 70°45′50″W
- Country: Argentina
- Province: Neuquén Province
- Time zone: UTC−3 (ART)
- Climate: Csb

Manzano Amargo is a village and municipality in Neuquén Province in southwestern Argentina.
