= Ezequiel Manzano =

Argentine footballer (born 1988)

Personal information
- Full name: Ezequiel Ignacio Manzano
- Date of birth: 4 October 1988 (age 38)
- Place of birth: Córdoba, Argentina
- Height: 1.75 m (5 ft 9 in)
- Position: Midfielder

Youth career
- 2002–2004: Club Atlético Boca Juniors
- 2004–2007: Club de Gimnasia y Esgrima La Plata

Senior career*
Years	Team	Apps	(Gls)
2007–2009	Modica Calcio		
2009–2010	Taurisano Calcio		
2011	Club de Deportes Cobresal		
2011–2012	General Paz Juniors		
2012–2013	Club Atlético Central Norte		
2013	FC Universitatea Cluj		
2013–2014	General Paz Juniors		
2014	Miami Dade FC	6	
- * Club domestic league appearances and goals as of 30 May 2014

Ezequiel Manzano (born 4 October 1988) is an Argentine footballer who plays as a midfielder.

== Career ==
On 30 May 2014 Manzano made his official debut for Miami Dade FC in a 3x1 win over Nacional SC.

== Clubs ==
Club	Country	Year
Boca Juniors	Argentina	2002–2004
Gimnasia y Esgrima La Plata	Argentina	2004–2007
Modica Calcio	Italy	2007–2009
Taurisano Calcio	Italy	2009–2010
Cobresal	Chile	2011
Juniors	Argentina	2011–2012
Central Norte	Argentina	2012–2013
U Cluj	Romania	2013
Juniors	Argentina	2013–2014
Miami Dade FC	United States	2014
