= Charalampos Brilakis =

Greek footballer (born 1981)

Personal information
- Date of birth: 28 October 1981 (age 45)
- Place of birth: Athens, Greece
- Height: 1.78 m (5 ft 10 in)
- Position: Defender

Team information
- Current team: Panargiakos

Senior career*
Years	Team	Apps	(Gls)
2004–2005	Lilas	28	(2)
2005–2009	Kalamata	102	(4)
2009–2010	Diagoras	27	(1)
2010–2011	Trikala	29	(0)
2011–2012	Doxa Drama	9	(0)
2012–2013	Panserraikos	37	(0)
2013–2014	Iraklis	7	(1)
2014–2015	Kallithea	17	(0)
2015	Panargiakos	0	(0)
2015–2016	Chania	27	(3)
2016–2018	Asteras Vlachioti	0	(0)
2018–	Panargiakos	0	(0)
- * Club domestic league appearances and goals as of 18 December 2011

Charalampos Brilakis (Greek: Χαράλαμπος Μπριλάκης; born 28 October 1981) is a Greek professional football player currently playing as a defender for Panargiakos.

== Career ==
Brilakis started his professional career in 2004 for Lilas, which was then playing at Gamma Ethniki. For the majority of his career, he played for the Greek Football League club Kalamata FC, in which he made 102 appearances in four years. Later, he joined Diagoras and Trikala. He signed a one-year contract with Super League club Doxa Drama FC on September 9, 2011. On July 18, 2013, he signed an annual contract with Football League club Iraklis.
