= Hassoma Bino Bamba =

Ivorian footballer

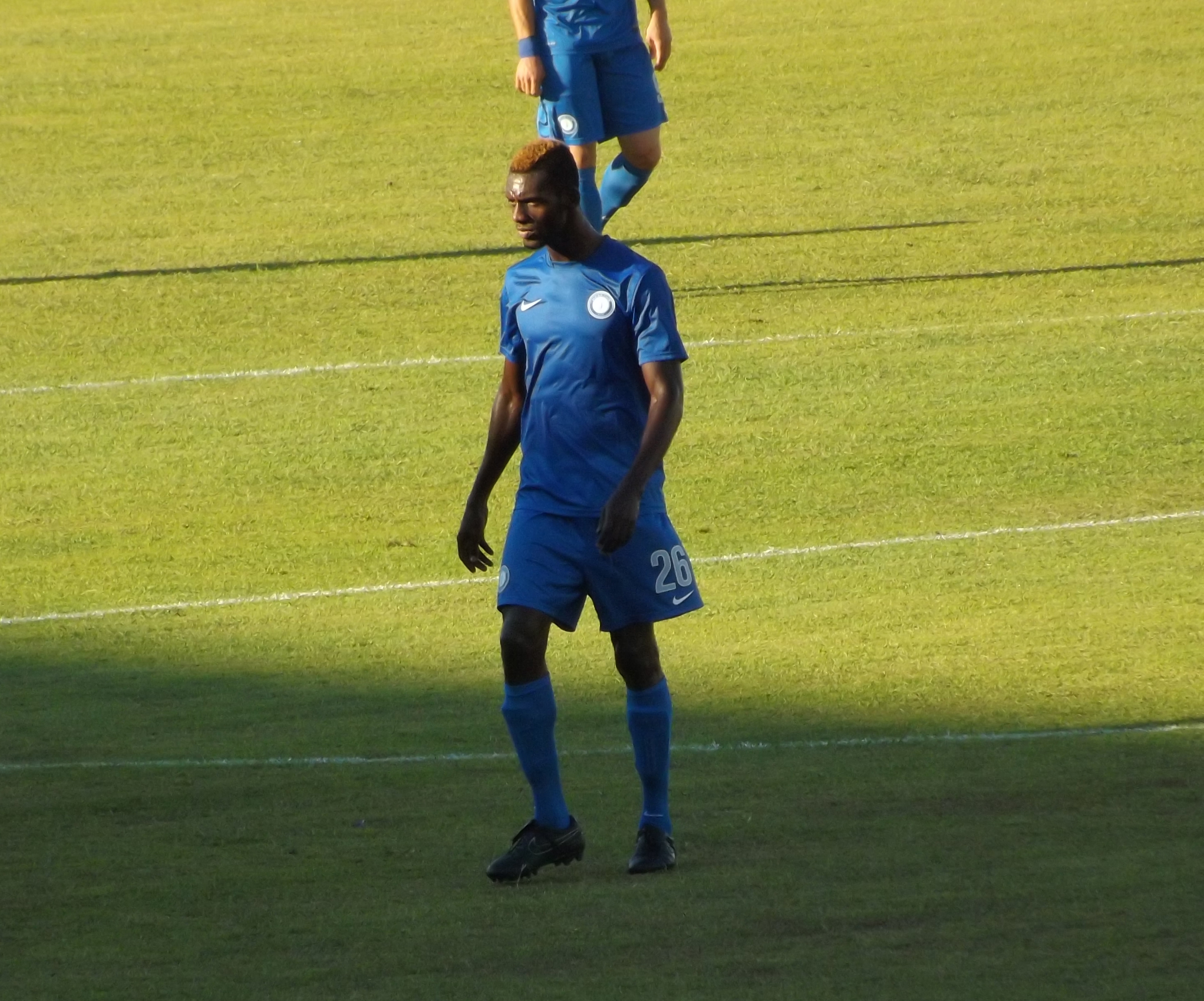
- Bamba with Iraklis in 2013

Personal information
- Date of birth: 21 December 1990 (age 35)
- Place of birth: Bondoukou, Ivory Coast
- Height: 1.88 m (6 ft 2 in)
- Position: Defensive midfielder

Senior career*
Years	Team	Apps	(Gls)
2011–2013	AS Athlétic d'Adjamé		
2013–2015	Iraklis	40	(4)
2015	Apollon Kalamarias	2	(0)
2016–2017	FF Jaro	33	(1)
2017	→ JBK (loan)	1	(0)
- * Club domestic league appearances and goals as of 01:06, 4 November 2019 (UTC)

Hassoma Bino Bamba (born 21 December 1990) is an Ivorian former professional footballer who played as a defensive midfielder for AS Athlétic d'Adjamé in his home country club, and for Iraklis and Apollon Kalamarias in Greece.

== Career ==
Bamba was born in Bondoukou. He started his career in AS Athlétic d'Adjamé. On 29 August 2013 he signed for Greek Football League club Iraklis. He debuted for Iraklis on 30 September 2013 in an away loss against Kavala. In February 2015 he joined Apollon Kalamarias. He debuted for his new club in a 5–0 home win against Zakynthos.
