= Salinas del Manzano =

Salinas del Manzano, Spain
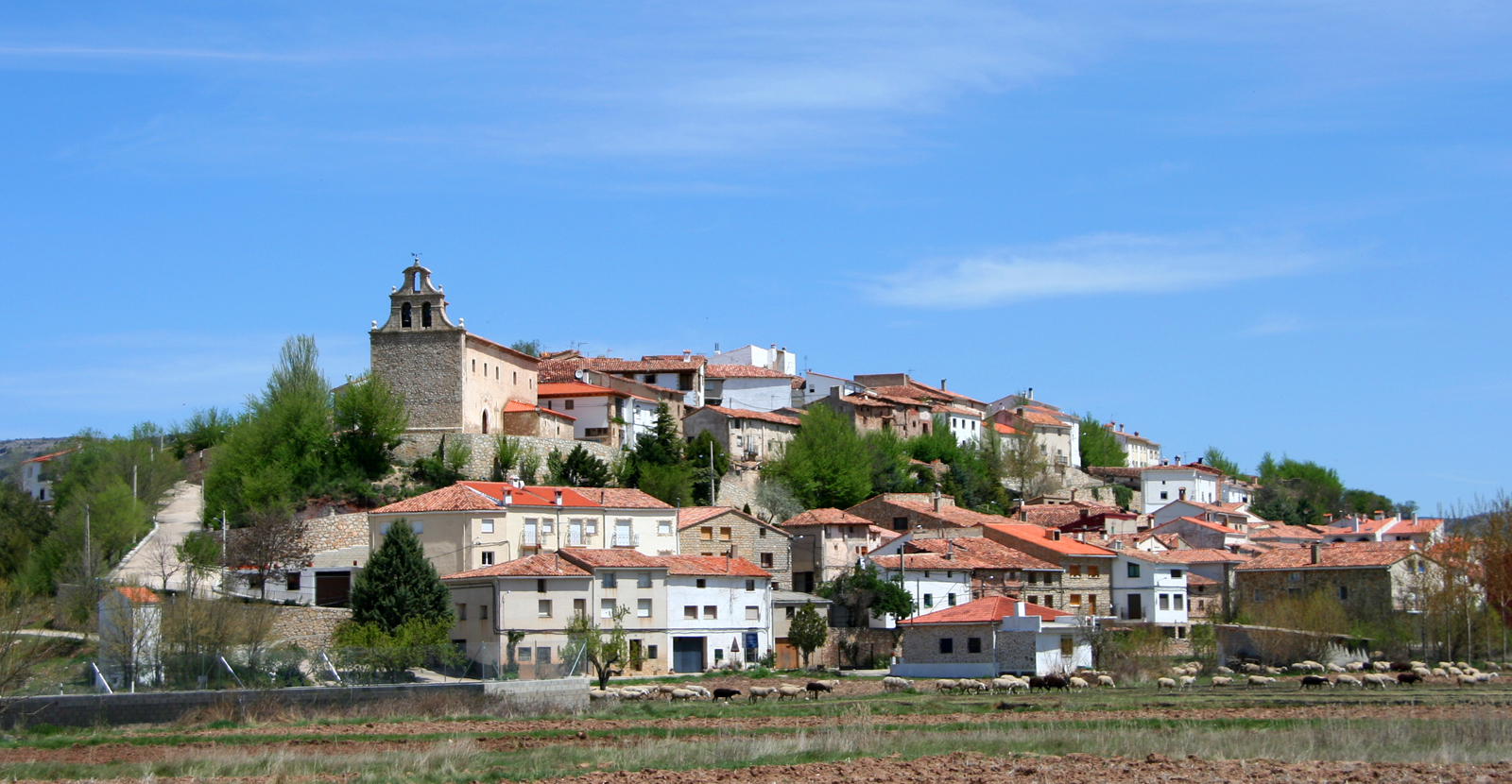

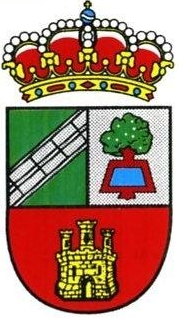
- Flag Coat of arms

- Location within Castilla-La Mancha
- Coordinates: 40°05′N 1°33′W
- Country: Spain
- Autonomous community: Castile-La Mancha
- Province: Cuenca
- Municipality: Salinas del Manzano

Area
  - Total: 33 km^{2} (13 sq mi)

Population (2025-01-01)
  - Total: 86
  - Density: 2.6/km^{2} (6.7/sq mi)
- Time zone: UTC+1 (CET)
  - Summer (DST): UTC+2 (CEST)

Salinas del Manzano is a city of Spain in the province of Cuenca in the autonomous community of Castile-La Mancha. It has an area of 33.65 km^{2} with population of 105 inhabitants (INE 2010) and a population density of 3.21 inhabitants / km^{2}.

== Localization ==
The mountain town of Salinas del Manzano is situated in the eastern foothills of the Serrania de Cuenca, south of Mount Universal and very close to the border with the province of Valencia's Corner Ademuz. Cabriel River waters bathe the term of the population. The current location of the town is close to the river Henarrubia, a tributary of another great river, Mill River. The main route of communication is by the N420, which connects Córdoba to Tarragona. This road goes through the center of town. It is located 82 kilometers from Cuenca and Teruel 67 km.

== What to see ==
=== Tour ===
Salinas del Manzano has some interesting places to go sightseeing, like:

- Nativity Church
- San Roque y Pósito Chapel
- Castle of Malenas
- Hiking trails that cover more than 20 natural springs spread the term
- Roman Saltworks

The surrounding area includes the Serranía de Cuenca, the Montes Universales, and the Cabriel River. The town celebrates the feast of San Roque on 16 August.

=== "Las alcobas del Salín" Museum ===
The habits of the area come to this museum. The exhibition includes memories about the past in Salinas and all kinds of tools and equipments of domestic life. You can visit it during the Open Hours of City Council and the library

== History ==
The oldest name recorded is "La fuente del Manzano", as made known in a letter signed by the Infante Don Sancho, the eldest son of King Alfonso XI. This letter is signed on March 21, 1281 and which urges the tenants of "las salinas de Fuente el Manzano" to pay what was owed to the Chapter of Canons of Cuenca.(A.C.C.I., Box 9, no. 23) Fifth Fulvio Flaco highlights the importance of saline springs in the area in the year. But the first documentary evidence of the salt has, which are known in the town by the name of "El Salero", dating from the days April 9, 1187 in which King Alfonso VIII of Castile granted the tithe of salt the community of canons of the church of Santa Maria Basin The reference to the salt is in the archives of the cathedral of Cuenca (ACCI, Box 1, no. 9), Some historians, situate this place near the salinas, then existing, the Roman mansion of Albonica, whose meaning can refer to the white salt flats. In the 10th century the fortress was built of Malenas (Magdalena) for mulsumanes during their domination. In the Muslim period, between the 11th and 12th centuries, predates the Christian conquest of this area, the castle of Malenas was part of the defensive line that ran between the Taifa of Albarracin and Alpuente. This line also formed part the Huélamo castle, Mira, Boniches, Santa Cruz de Moya, Algarra, Alcalá de la Vega, El Cuervo, Tormón, Villel and Teruel. It was built with every possibility in the period known as "Taifa Kingdoms". It is located in a rocky lookout pierced with caves and passages that reach the rocks at its base, so dominates a large area and part of an important avenue for communication of the time, the road now known to the name "Road or Route Moya del Cid". The above path is coincident with the path from Valencia to the Universal Monts through Utiel, Moya, Alcalá de la Vega, the castle of Malenas (in Salinas del Manzano), Altarejos (Campillo de Sierra), the Marquis Huerta, Valdemeca, Huélamo and Tragacete Our area was conquered from the Arabs between 1176 and 1183 year in all likelihood out in 1176 by Fort de Tena and then the lord of Albarracin D. Pedro Ruiz de Azagra, being repopulated by Alfonso VIII for a first line of containment against neighboring kingdoms of Valencia and Aragon. Salinas del Manzano, near Cañete, Salvacañete, Alcalá de la Vega and Boniches are taken from the Muslim and Christian for consolidation repopulated with people from the area of Leon, Astorga, Burgos and the primitive Mondoñedo born population center known as the Source name Manzano.

- In 1231 allow the boundaries between the diocese of Cuenca and Albarracin. Cause of this Salinas becomes dependent on Cuenca when before depended on Moya. Thanks to Fernando III, is achieved the upgrading of the village of Moya and place as the capital of the region, wresting privileges Alfonso VIII had given Cañete.
- In the year 1443 Salinas is royal hamlet and pay to the Royal Crown 680 farthing. After that Belongs to Cañete's Marquis and later in the 16th century returned to the Moya's Marquis . In these dates Builds its parish church.
- On 27 June 1505 The Lands of the Moya's Marquis belong the following villages: Henarejos, Cardenete, Carboneras, San Martin de Boniches, Villar del Humo, Pajaroncillo, Campillos Sierra Huerta and Marquesado lagoon, Zafrilla, Canopies, Salvacañete, Boniches Alcala de la Vega, El Cubillo, Algarra, Garcimolina, Talayuelas, Aliaguilla, Narboneta, Garaballa, Campillos of Parabientos, Sta. Cruz de Moya, Campalbo, Casas de Pedro Alonso, Sto domingo de Moya, Los Huertos and Salinas de la Fuente del Manzano.
- On July 28, 1513 a son of this town called Juan Lopez, son of Andres Sanchez Lopez and Quiteria, went to India (Peru) in search of fortune and doing, as reflected in the cas of Trade in Seville. Many other salt makers accompanied the conquistadors in America.
- In the Bishopric's Book of baptisms of 1587, Salinas next to Salvacañete has about 320 inhabitants.
- In the year April 1809 reach to salinas, the Marshal Culincourt Moncey's troops and after trying to take Valencia unsuccessfully (June 28 de1.808) and to partake of the second siege of Saragossa, where it would displace our area. Reactions for this presence will not wait and create groups, meeting in the mountains, facing the invader. After a failed attempt by the French to arrest these groups, people broke out. Armed with the most rudimentary weapons, everyday work tools such as sickles, pitchforks and some blunderbusses they had achieved, were meeting all of the area in Salinas del Manzano, and later they were established the headquarters in safer parts of the Sierra de Valdemeca. In their leaders can highlight the "Uncle Peter".
- In the year 1833 occurs the division of judicial districts in the province, Salinas del Manzano is located within the de Cañete, which in this day still belongs.
- On 28 September 1836 troops under General Elizabethan San Miguel, Chief of the Army of the Centre, put in motion to seize the Carlist troops entrenched in the Malena's castle. This Group would not come to the area to find another group that diverted his route to Pajarón and Cañete.
- On 12 January 1839, Don Francisco Narváez, commander chief and captain general of the Elizabethan army, in a statement referring to the confrontation had with Carlist troops at the foot of the castle of Malenas:

“...he demostrado su nulidad a la facción en el enfrentamiento que ha tenido lugar en Salinas del Manzano, a los pies de su castillo de la Magdalena.”

- The 1st Carlist War, 1840, when Marshal Van Goebben responsible to the Carlist Army and in charge of the fortification of Cañete imposes the punishment of the delivery of 10 guns Faust Saiz, a resident of this place, because he would not cooperate in the fortification of the castle of Cañete. "al cabo de doce dias, entrego seis y llego herido en un brazo...."

The Madoz's Dictionary, published an article in 1844, refers to Salinas de la Fuente del Manzano in these terms:

- Statistics In 1878, Salinas del Manzano figure with 421 souls and 1878, according to Mena Torres has fifty houses, 45 houses, three farmhouses, and 451 inhabitants.

In the January 1, 1995 has 136 inhabitants.
