= Franck Mbarga =

Cameroonian-German footballer

Personal information
- Date of birth: 9 January 1992 (age 34)
- Place of birth: Yaoundé, Cameroon
- Height: 1.77 m (5 ft 10 in)
- Position: Central midfielder

Team information
- Current team: Al Sahel

Youth career
- Montañeros

Senior career*
| Years | Team | Apps | (Gls) |
| 2011–2012 | 1899 Hoffenheim II | 5 | (0) |
| 2013 | Waldhof Mannheim II | 8 | (0) |
| 2013–2014 | Anagennisi Giannitsa | 9 | (1) |
| 2014–2015 | Ethnikos Gazoros | 11 | (0) |
| 2015 | Slavia Sofia | 13 | (1) |
| 2016 | 1461 Trabzon | 2 | (0) |
| 2018 | Küçük Kaymaklı | 14 | (0) |
| 2018 | Lokomotiv Sofia | 5 | (0) |
| 2019 | CS Afumați | | |
| 2019 | Ceahlăul Piatra Neamț | | |
| 2020– | Al Sahel | | |
- * Club domestic league appearances and goals as of 20:41, 12 May 2020 (UTC)

Franck Mbarga (born 9 January 1992) is a Cameroonian professional footballer who plays as a midfielder for Al Sahel SC in Kuwait. He also holds German citizenship.

== Career ==
Mbarga relocated to Bulgaria, signing a contract with Slavia Sofia in early 2015, where he remained until October of that year. On 28 January 2016, Mbarga became part of the 1461 Trabzon team. In July 2018, he moved to Lokomotiv Sofia. On 7 February 2020, Mbarge confirmed on his official Instagram profile, that he had signed for Al Sahel SC in Kuwait.
