= Iordanis Papargyriou =

Greek footballer

Personal information
- Date of birth: 15 May 1992 (age 34)
- Place of birth: Thessaloniki, Greece
- Height: 1.83 m (6 ft 0 in)
- Position: Left-back

Team information
- Current team: Kozani

Senior career*
| Years | Team | Apps | (Gls) |
| 2012–2013 | Odysseas Kordelio | 17 | (0) |
| 2013–2014 | Kavala | 20 | (1) |
| 2014–2015 | Anagennisi Karditsa | 22 | (0) |
| 2015–2016 | Trikala | 10 | (0) |
| 2016–2019 | Lamia | 29 | (0) |
| 2019–2021 | Doxa Drama | 39 | (0) |
| 2021- | Kozani | 39 | (0) |
- * Club domestic league appearances and goals as of 14 November 2022

Iordanis Papargyriou (Greek: Ιορδάνης Παπαργυρίου; born 15 May 1992) is a Greek professional footballer who plays as a left-back for Gamma Ethniki club Kozani.
