= Marek Jarolím =

Czech footballer (born 1984)

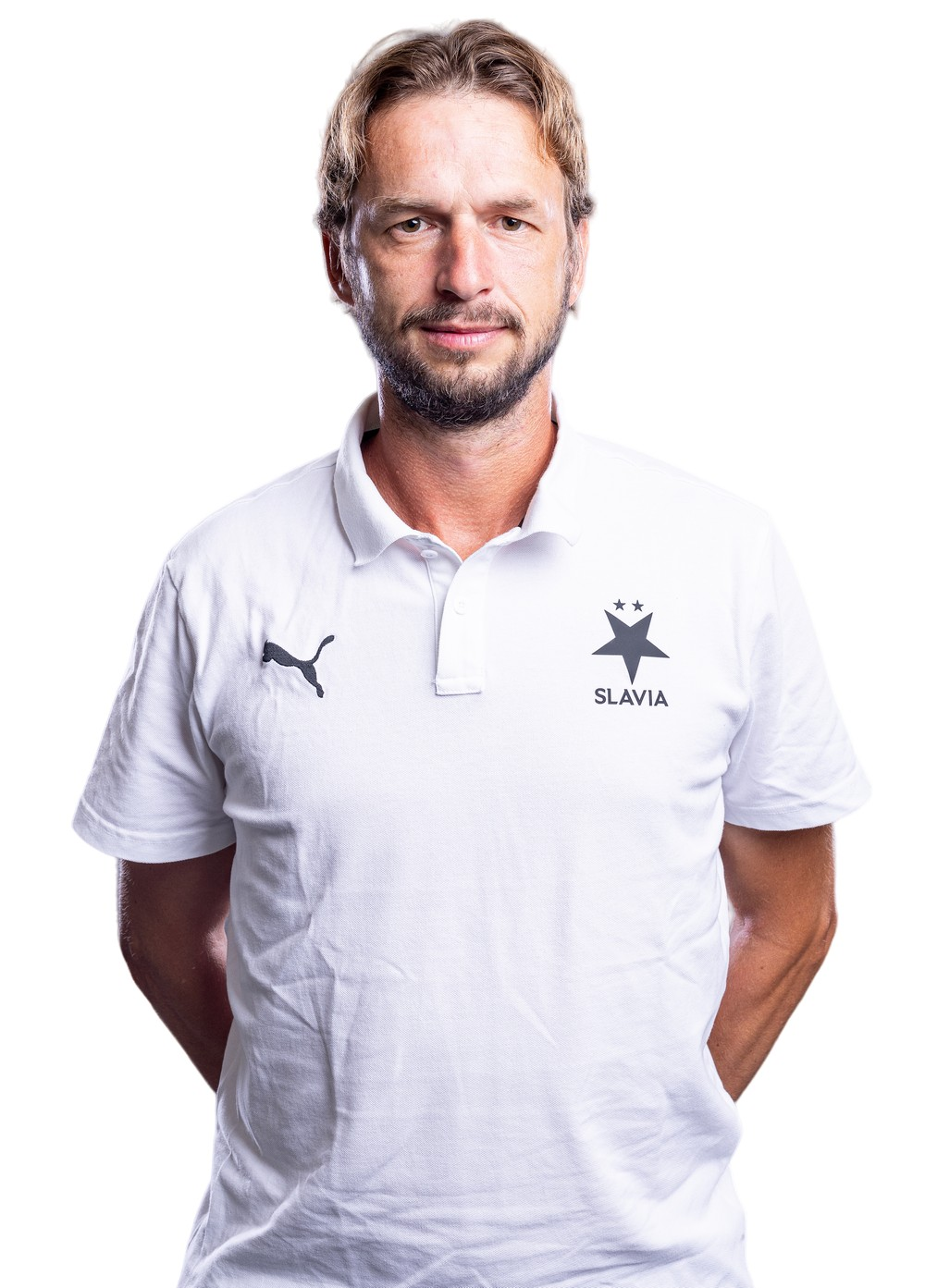
- Jarolím in 2023

Personal information
- Date of birth: 21 May 1984 (age 42)
- Place of birth: Olomouc, Czechoslovakia
- Height: 1.83 m (6 ft 0 in)
- Position: Midfielder

Youth career
- Sparta Prague

Senior career*
| Years | Team | Apps | (Gls) |
| 2002–2006 | Sparta Prague | 0 | (0) |
| 2004–2005 | → Mladá Boleslav (loan) | 23 | (1) |
| 2005 | → Viktoria Plzeň (loan) | 4 | (0) |
| 2006–2008 | Viktoria Plzeň | 42 | (7) |
| 2008–2009 | Slavia Prague | 39 | (7) |
| 2009–2012 | Jablonec | 75 | (12) |
| 2012–2013 | Teplice | 11 | (4) |
| 2013 | Hangzhou Greentown | 4 | (0) |
| 2013–2014 | Iraklis | 8 | (3) |
| 2014–2015 | Slovan Liberec | 16 | (3) |
| 2015 | Bohemians 1905 | 7 | (0) |
| Total | | 229 | (37) |

International career
| 2003 | Czech Republic U19 | 1 | (0) |
| 2004 | Czech Republic U21 | 1 | (0) |

Managerial career
- 2018–2020: Slavia Prague (U14)
- 2020–2023: Slavia Prague B
- 2024–2025: Vysočina Jihlava
- 2025–2026: Karviná
- 2026: Arka Gdynia
- * Club domestic league appearances and goals

Marek Jarolím (born 21 May 1984) is a Czech professional football manager and former player who played as a midfielder. He was most recently in charge of I liga club Arka Gdynia.

== Playing career ==
In March 2013, Jarolím signed for Chinese Super League club Hangzhou Greentown. After leaving China, he started training for Slavia Prague and was engaged in negotiations for returning to his former club. Shortly afterwards, on 6 September 2013, he signed for Greek Football League club Iraklis. He made his debut for his new club in an away 3–2 loss against Kavala. His first goal for Iraklis came in a home win against Anagennisi Giannitsa. On 18 January 2014, his contract with Iraklis was terminated by mutual consent. In total, he made eight appearances for the club and scored three goals. On 21 January 2014, Jarolím signed a contract with Czech First League side Slovan Liberec.

== Managerial career ==
In the summer of 2017, Jarolím joined the Slavia Prague U17 team as an assistant coach. In June 2020, he was promoted to head coach of Slavia's B-team.

On 4 August 2024, Jarolím was hired by Czech National Football League club Vysočina Jihlava as the manager.

On 15 October 2025, Jarolím was appointed head coach of Czech First League club Karviná. In his only season in charge, he led Karviná to an eight-place league finish and won the 2025–26 Czech Cup. He left Karviná after they were expelled from the league in June 2026.

On 17 June 2026, Jarolím was appointed manager of Polish I liga club Arka Gdynia on a two-year contract. He was sacked on 22 September 2026 after a series of bad results, with a record of four wins, two draws and four losses.

== Personal life ==
He is a nephew of Karel Jarolím, a Czech football coach, and a cousin of Lukáš Jarolím and David Jarolím.

== Honours ==
=== Player ===
Slavia Prague

- Czech First League: 2007–08, 2008–09

Jablonec

- Czech First League runner-up: 2009–10
- Czech Cup runner-up: 2009–10

=== Managerial ===
Karviná

- Czech Cup: 2025–26
