= Bojan Dojkić =

Serbian footballer

Personal information
- Full name: Bojan Dojkić
- Date of birth: 25 October 1984 (age 42)
- Place of birth: Pirot, SFR Yugoslavia
- Height: 1.94 m (6 ft 4 1/2 in)
- Position: Defender

Team information
- Current team: Radnički Pirot
- Number: 8

Senior career*
Years	Team	Apps	(Gls)
2005–2009	Hajduk Kula	28	(0)
2010	Radnički Niš	14	(0)
2010	Trikala	6	(0)
2011	Lokomotiv Plovdiv	0	(0)
2011–2012	Radnički Niš	28	(1)
2012–2014	Pierikos	67	(1)
2015	Agrotikos Asteras	18	(0)
2016	Trikala	7	(1)
2016	Apollon Kalamarias		
2017	Olympiacos Volos		
2017–	Radnički Pirot	87+	(2+)
- * Club domestic league appearances and goals as of 28 November 2013

Bojan Dojkić (born 25 October 1984, in Pirot) is a Serbian footballer who currently plays as a defender for Radnički Pirot.

== Career ==
Dojkić started his football career at Hajduk Kula, before transferred to Radnički Niš in January 2010.

In July 2010, it was announced that Bojan finally signed for Greek side Trikala. He made his debut in Greece during the 2010–2011 season on 12 September 2010 in a 0–1 away loss against Panetolikos. Dojkić appeared 6 times for Trikala, before signed with Bulgarian Lokomotiv Plovdiv on 30 December 2010. Now playing for FK Radnički from Niš.
