= Stratos Chintzidis =

Greek professional footballer

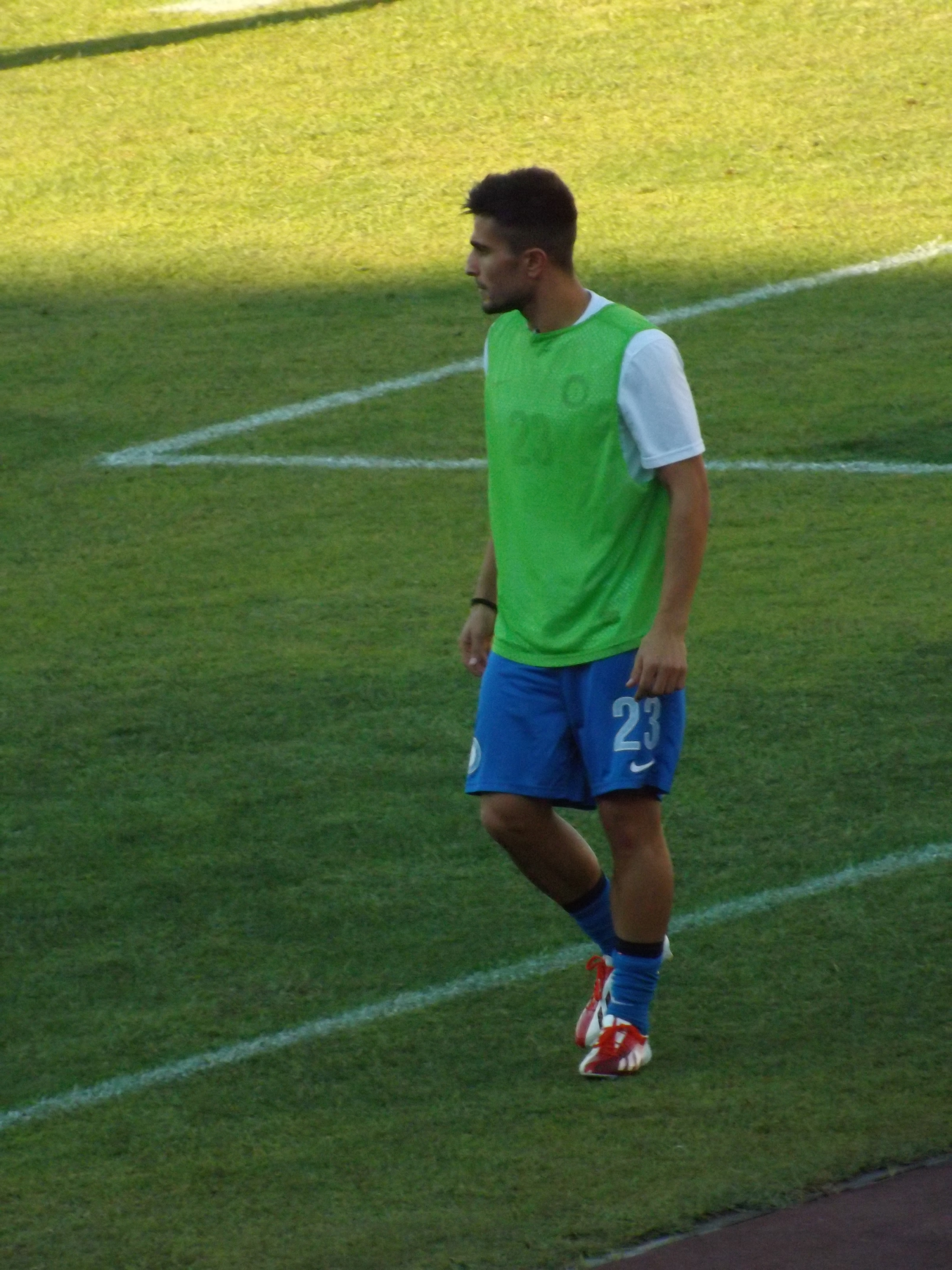

Personal information
- Full name: Efstratios Chintzidis
- Date of birth: 13 December 1987 (age 38)
- Place of birth: Alexandroupoli, Greece
- Height: 1.74 m (5 ft 8 1/2 in)
- Position: Left back

Team information
- Current team: Episkopi

Senior career*
Years	Team	Apps	(Gls)
2006–2008	Polykastro	34	(1)
2008	Enosi Alexandroupoli	11	(0)
2009	Fokikos	12	(0)
2009–2010	Anagennisi Giannitsa	14	(0)
2010–2011	Eordaikos 2007	20	(2)
2011	Pontioi Katerini	4	(0)
2012	Paniliakos	15	(1)
2012–2013	Apollon Smyrnis	25	(2)
2013	Iraklis	0	(0)
2014	Panachaiki	13	(0)
2014	Olympiacos Volou	5	(0)
2015	Agrotikos Asteras	24	(5)
2016	Kerkyra	12	(4)
2017	Apollon Smyrnis	8	(0)
2017–2018	Trikala	21	(1)
2018	Iraklis	3	(0)
2019	Diagoras	0	(0)
2019–2020	Ierapetra	20	(1)
2020	Triglia	0	(0)
2021–2022	Ierapetra	23	(1)
2022–2023	Chania	7	(0)
2023	Panthrakikos		
2023–2024	Pyli Kos		
2024	Panthrakikos		
2024–2025	Anagennisi Karditsa		
2025–2026	Doxa Platane		
2026–	Episkopi		
- * Club domestic league appearances and goals as of 15 January 2023

Stratos Chintzidis (Greek: Στράτος Χιντζίδης, born 13 December 1987) is a Greek professional footballer who plays as a left back for Gamma Ethniki club Episkopi.

== Career ==
Chintzidis started his career with Polykastro in 2006. Subsequently, he played for Enosi Alexandroupoli, Fokikos, Anagennisi Giannitsa, Eordaikos 2007 and Pontioi Katerini. Chintzidis signed for Paniliakos in January 2012. On 24 July 2012, he signed a contract with Apollon Smyrnis spending the entire 2012–13 season with the club and getting crowned Football League champion. On 13 August 2013, he signed a contract with Greek Football League club Iraklis, but he was released in November before appearing in any official matches. A few weeks later he signed for Panachaiki. He was released from the club in July 2014. On 7 August 2017, Trikala officially announced the signing of the experienced defender. On 24 March 2018, he scored his first goal with a magnificent long free-kick in a 1–1 away draw against Apollon Pontus. On 14 July 2018, he joined Kissamikos on a free transfer. Roughly a month later, however, he terminated his contract with the team and joined Iraklis.

== Honours ==
Apollon Smyrnis

- Greek Football League: 2012–13
