= Vítor Lima =

Portuguese footballer

Personal information
- Full name: Vítor Manuel Lima Santos
- Date of birth: 10 August 1981 (age 45)
- Place of birth: Guimarães, Portugal
- Height: 1.80 m (5 ft 11 in)
- Position: Midfielder

Youth career
- 1991–2000: Vitória Guimarães

Senior career*
Years	Team	Apps	(Gls)
2000–2001	Salamanca	0	(0)
2000–2001	→ Zamora (loan)	3	(0)
2001–2004	Caçadores Taipas	101	(17)
2004–2005	Académico Viseu	35	(1)
2005–2007	Falkirk	36	(0)
2007–2009	Ethnikos Piraeus	57	(3)
2009–2010	Falkirk	26	(0)
2010–2012	Doxa Drama	55	(2)
2012–2013	Ethnikos Achna	9	(0)
2013–2014	Iraklis	28	(0)
2014–2018	Famalicão	129	(8)
Total		479	(31)

International career
1996–1997	Portugal U15	11	(4)
1997–1998	Portugal U16	15	(0)
1998–1999	Portugal U17	8	(0)
1999	Portugal U18	2	(0)
- * Club domestic league appearances and goals

Vítor Manuel Lima Santos (born 10 August 1981) is a Portuguese former professional footballer who played as a midfielder.

== Club career ==
=== Early years ===
Aged 19, Guimarães-born Lima left his country and joined UD Salamanca in Spain. He would never appear officially for the first team, also being loaned to modest Zamora CF, and left the Castile and León club in 2001.

In the following four seasons, Lima played in the Portuguese third division with Clube Caçadores das Taipas – three years – and Académico de Viseu FC.

=== Falkirk ===
On 15 June 2005, free agent Lima signed for Falkirk alongside compatriot Tiago Jonas, being discovered by the team's player-coach Russell Latapy who had spent several seasons in Portugal as a player. He made his Scottish Premier League debut on 6 August, playing the full 90 minutes in a 2–0 away win against Livingston.

On 28 April 2006, Lima extended his contract with the Bairns for a further season. He left the club in summer 2007 after making 42 competitive appearances (30 starts), hoping to "return to Portugal".

=== Greece, return to Scotland ===
Lima joined Greek second tier club Ethnikos Piraeus F.C. in June 2007. He often started during his tenure.

On 30 July 2009, Lima returned to Falkirk on a one-year deal. He missed several games during the campaign due to a knee injury, with the side eventually being relegated from the top flight after ranking 12th and last, following which he was released.

=== Later career ===
Lima return to Greece and its division two for 2010–11, helping Doxa Drama F.C. to promote to the Super League. In the 2012 off-season he moved to neighbouring Cyprus, signing with Ethnikos Achna FC.

On 12 July 2013, Lima moved to Iraklis F.C. of the Greek second division. On 7 June of the following year he was supposed to sign for another team in the country, Agrotikos Asteras FC, but the deal eventually fell through.

Lima retired in July 2018 at the age of 37 after four seasons with F.C. Famalicão (where he often acted as captain), the last three spent in the Portuguese second tier. He immediately joined their coaching staff.
