= Marcelo Penta =

Argentine footballer

Personal information
- Full name: Marcelo Alejandro Penta
- Date of birth: 26 August 1985 (age 41)
- Place of birth: Las Heras, Mendoza, Argentina
- Height: 1.74 m (5 ft 8 1/2 in)
- Position: Midfielder

Senior career*
Years	Team	Apps	(Gls)
2004–2009	Newell's Old Boys	24	(1)
2006–2007	→ Tiro Federal (loan)	?	(?)
2007–2008	→ Chacarita Juniors (loan)	?	(?)
2009–2012	Pierikos	74	(4)
2012–2013	Ethnikos Achna	18	(2)
2013–2016	Aiginiakos	56	(5)
2016–2017	Apollon Larissa	22	(1)
2017–2019	Volos	32	(3)
2019–2020	Veria	19	(0)
2020–2023	Ypato	?	(?)
Total		245	(16)
- * Club domestic league appearances and goals as of 7 January 2023

Marcelo Alejandro Penta (born 26 August 1985) is a retired Argentine professional footballer who played as a midfielder.

== Career ==
Born in Las Heras, Mendoza, Marcelo Penta began his professional football career with Newell's Old Boys in the Argentine Primera División. In order to gain regular playing time, he was loaned to Chacarita Juniors in July 2007. After returning to Newell's, he did not make any first-team appearances and moved to Greece in July 2009 to continue his professional career.

== Honours ==
Newell's Old Boys

- Primera División: 2004 Apertura
