= Matías Manzano =

Argentine footballer

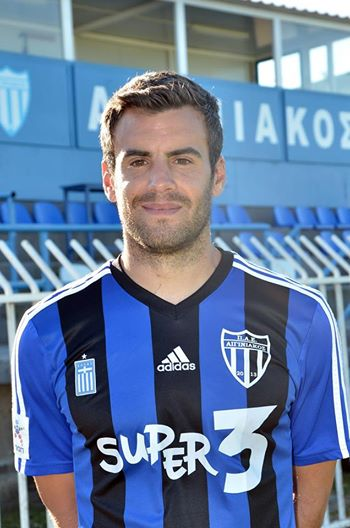
- Manzano with Aiginiakos in 2014

Personal information
- Full name: Matías Joel Manzano
- Date of birth: June 17, 1986 (age 40)
- Place of birth: Córdoba, Argentina
- Height: 1.80 m (5 ft 11 in)
- Position: Forward

Youth career
- 2001–04: Racing de Córdoba

Senior career*
Years	Team	Apps	(Gls)
2005–2006	Racing de Córdoba	14	(5)
2006	Alianza Atlético	12	(1)
2007	Alumni Villa María	9	(1)
2007	Talleres	0	(0)
2008–2009	Getafe B		
2009–2010	Gimnasia de Jujuy	10	(0)
2010–2011	Cobresal	15	(0)
2011–2012	Central Norte	45	(6)
2013	Universitario de Sucre	39	(15)
2014	Aiginiakos	17	(4)
2014–2015	Blooming	32	(7)
2015–2016	Deportivo La Guaira	36	(14)
2016	Deportivo Lara	19	(4)
2017	Apollon Larissa		
2018	Ialysos		
2018–2019	Racing de Córdoba	16	(2)
2020	Atlético Río Tercero	5	(1)
- * Club domestic league appearances and goals

Matías Joel Manzano (born June 17, 1986, in Córdoba, Argentina) is an Argentine former football forward.

== Clubs ==
Club	País	Año	PJ	Goles
Racing de Córdoba	(Argentina)	2005–2006	14	5
Alianza Atlético	(Peru)	2006	12	1
Alumni	(Argentina)	2007	9	1
Talleres	(Argentina)	2007	0	0
Getafe B	(Spain)	2008–2009		
Gimnasia y Esgrima de Jujuy	(Argentina)	2009–2010	10	0
Cobresal	(Chile)	2010–2011	15	0
Central Norte	(Argentina)	2011–2012	45	6
Universitario de Sucre	(Bolivia)	2013	39	15
Aiginiakos	(Greece)	2014	17	4
Blooming	(Bolivia)	2014–2015	32	7
Deportivo La Guaira	(Venezuela)	2015–2016	36	14
Deportivo Lara	(Venezuela)	2016	19	4
Apollon Larissa	(Greece)	2017		
Ialysos	(Greece)	2018		
Racing de Córdoba	(Argentina)	2018–2019	16	2
Atlético Río Tercero	(Argentina)	2020	5	1
