= Enzo Scorza =

Uruguayan footballer (born 1988)

Personal information
- Full name: Enzo Giovanni Scorza Clavijo
- Date of birth: 1 March 1988 (age 38)
- Place of birth: Rivera, Uruguay
- Height: 1.66 m (5 ft 5 in)
- Positions: Attacking midfielder; forward

Youth career
- 2000–2006: Danubio

Senior career*
Years	Team	Apps	(Gls)
2006–2008	Danubio	28	(3)
2009	Central Español	8	(0)
2009–2010	Brindisi		
2010–2011	Seregno		
2011–2012	Inter-SM		
2012–2013	Cienciano	33	(5)
2014	Iraklis	13	(2)

International career^{‡}
2005	Uruguay U17	9	(1)
2007	Uruguay U20	7	(0)
- * Club domestic league appearances and goals as of 16 July 2014 ‡ National team caps and goals as of 18 February 2013

Enzo Scorza (born 1 March 1988) is a Uruguayan footballer who currently plays as an attacking midfielder or forward for Iraklis in the Greek Football League.

== Club career ==
He made his youth career on Danubio, where he also played in the first team from 2006 to 2008. In January 2009 he moved from Danubio to Central Español along with Gerardo Vonder Putten.

In October 2009 he moved to Italy to join Brindisi, where he played until the end of the season.

In July 2010, he signed with Seregno, which plays in Italian Serie D.

On 17 July 2012, he signed a new deal with Peruvian side Cienciano. On 4 February 2014 he signed for Greek Football League club Iraklis.

== International career ==
Scorza was part of the Uruguay U17 squad that participated in the 2005 South American Under-17 Football Championship where his country finish runner-up and as a result, qualified to the 2005 FIFA U-17 World Championship in Peru.

He was also part of the Uruguay U20 squad that participated in the 2007 South American Youth Championship, but he was not called to the Youth World Cup.

On October 24, 2005, he was reserved by Jorge Fossati to play a friendly match with Uruguay's senior team against Mexico in Guadalajara. While he was called up, he was training with the Uruguay U-17 team.

== Honours ==
=== Danubio ===
- Uruguayan Primera División: 2006–07
