= Angelos Papasterianos =

Greek footballer (born 1991)

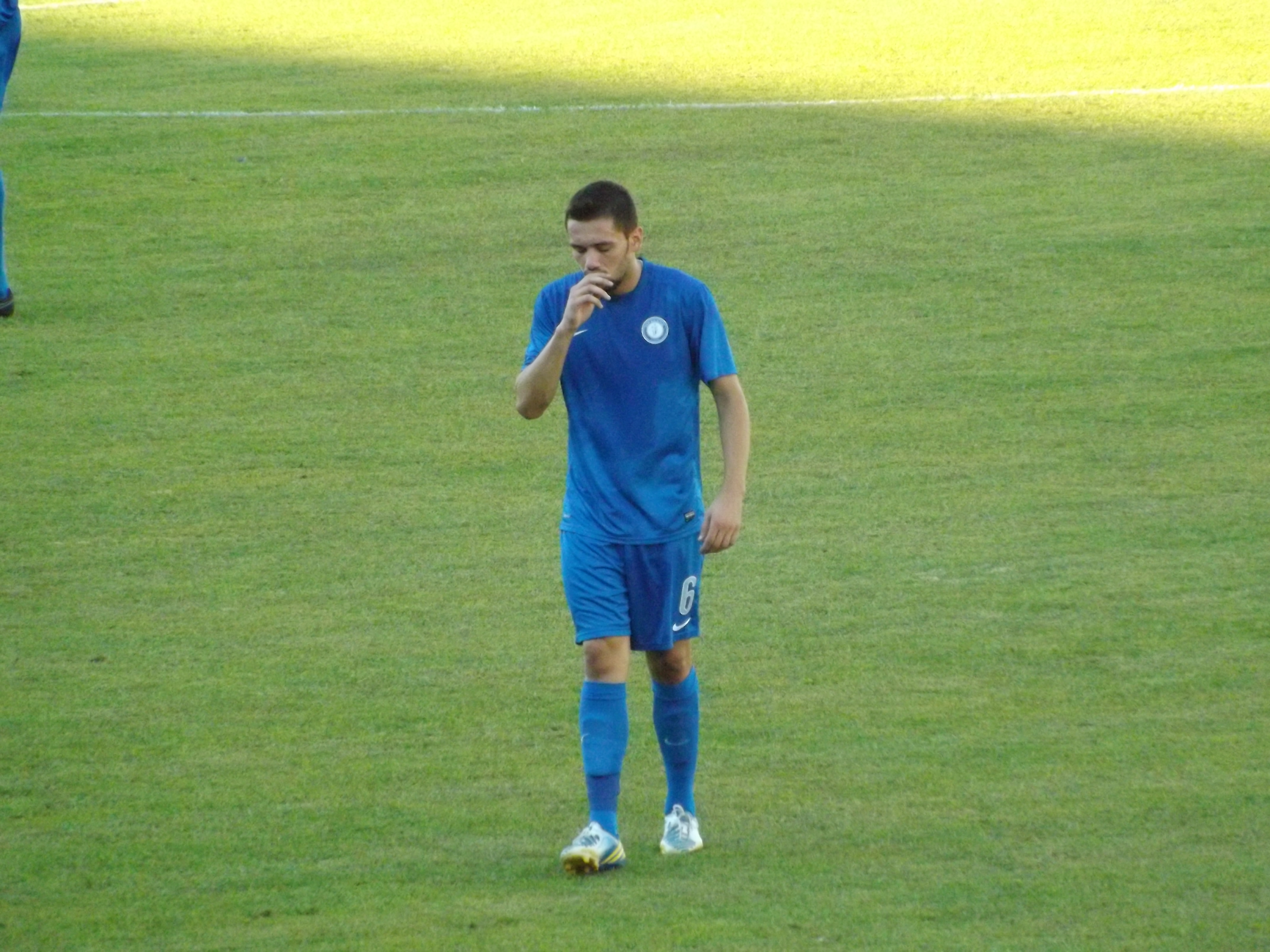

Personal information
- Full name: Angelos Papasterianos
- Date of birth: 11 July 1991 (age 35)
- Place of birth: Ierissos, Halkidiki, Greece
- Height: 1.81 m (5 ft 11 1/2 in)
- Position: Centre back

Team information
- Current team: Asteras Agios Nikolaos

Youth career
- 2006–2011: Iraklis

Senior career*
Years	Team	Apps	(Gls)
2011–2014	Iraklis	55	(2)
2014–2015	Apollon Kalamarias	18	(0)
2015	Panargiakos	0	(0)
2016–2017	Olympiakos Nicosia	23	(1)
2017–2018	Kavala	0	(0)
2018–2019	Aris Limassol	26	(3)
2019–2020	Kavala	19	(0)
2020–2021	Triglia	13	(0)
2021–2023	Iraklis	30	(2)
2023–2026	Kampaniakos	71	(1)
2026–	Asteras Agios Nikolaos		
- * Club domestic league appearances and goals as of 22 April 2026

Angelos Papasterianos (Greek: Άγγελος Παπαστεριανός; born 11 July 1991) is a Greek professional footballer who plays as a centre back for Asteras Agios Nikolaos.

== Career ==
Papasterianos began football in the academies of Iraklis. He debuted for Iraklis in the club's first and only season in the Football League 2 in a home draw against Apollon Kalamarias on 18 February 2012. His first goal was the equaliser in a home draw against Ethnikos Gazoros in the opening match of the 2012–13 Football League season. In 2014, he moved to Apollon Kalamarias but was not used much, so in 2015 he moved to Panargiakos F.C.

== Personal life ==
Papasterianos' is the younger brother of Manolis Papasterianos.
