= Lefteris Matsoukas =

Greek footballer (born 1990)

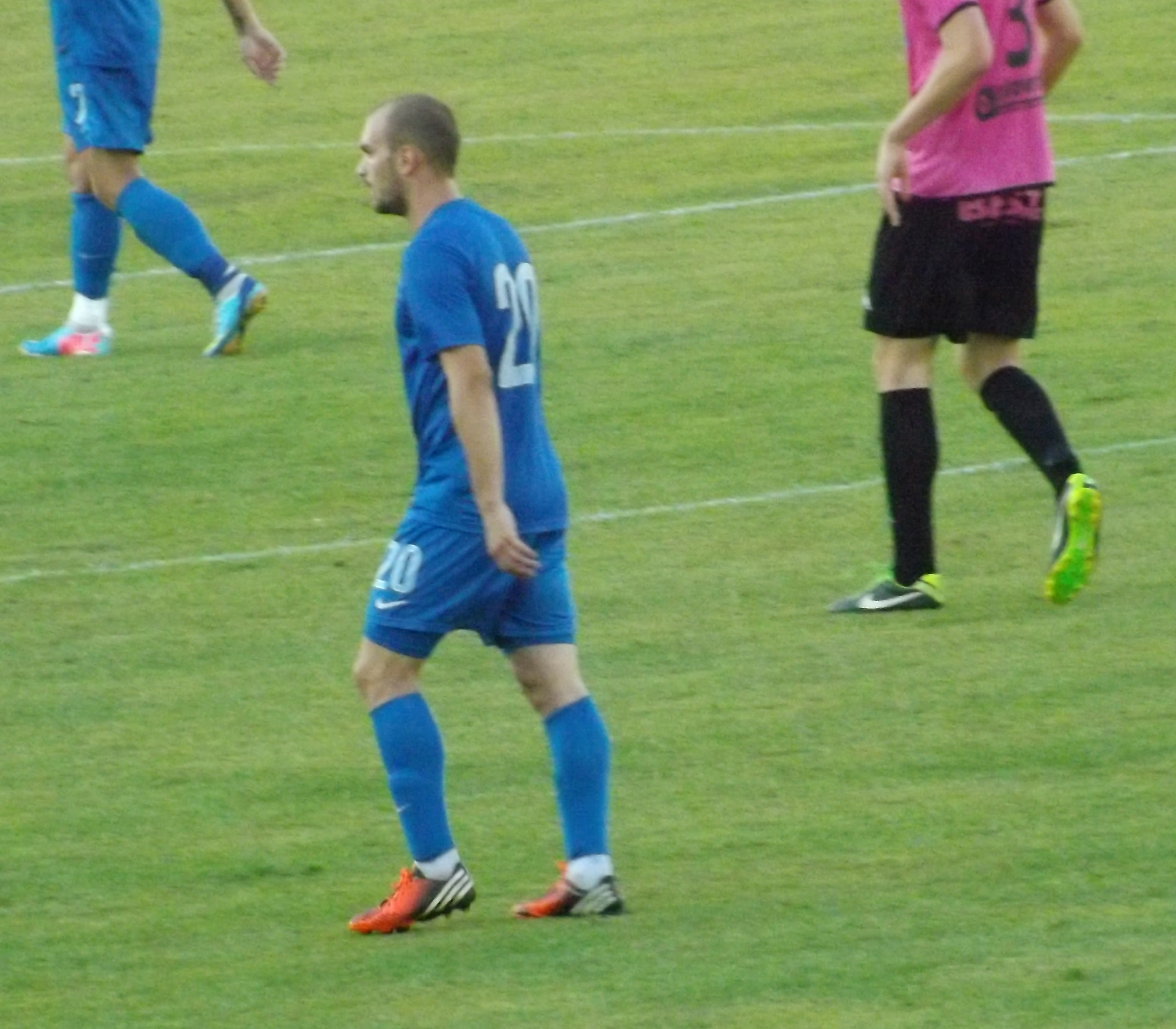
- Matsoukas in 2013

Personal information
- Full name: Eleftherios Matsoukas
- Date of birth: 7 March 1990 (age 36)
- Place of birth: Piraeus, Greece
- Height: 1.76 m (5 ft 9 in)
- Position: Forward

Team information
- Current team: Ionikos

Youth career
- 2002–2007: Olympiacos

Senior career*
Years	Team	Apps	(Gls)
2007–2009	Olympiacos	1	(0)
2008	→ Egaleo	5	(0)
2008	→ Ethnikos Asteras	11	(1)
2009	→ Werder Bremen II	12	(1)
2009–2010	Werder Bremen	6	(1)
2010–2011	Panegialios	8	(1)
2011–2013	Kallithea	31	(3)
2013–2014	Iraklis	25	(0)
2014–2015	Fostiras	11	(0)
2015–2017	Acharnaikos	34	(7)
2017	Lamia	16	(4)
2017–2018	Doxa Drama	22	(1)
2018	Aittitos Spata	6	(0)
2019–2020	Dinamo Vranje	20	(2)
2020–2022	Ionikos	43	(2)
2022–2023	Ilioupoli	6	(0)
2023	Irodotos	2	(0)
2023–2024	Acharnaikos	13	(1)
2024	Pierikos	5	(1)
2024–	Ionikos	20	(10)

International career^{‡}
2007–2008	Greece U19	11	(0)
- * Club domestic league appearances and goals as of 16 June 2023 ‡ National team caps and goals as of 6 December 2008

Lefteris Matsoukas (Greek: Λευτέρης Ματσούκας; born 7 March 1990) is a Greek professional footballer who plays as a forward for Gamma Ethniki club Ionikos.

== Club career ==
Born in Piraeus, Matsoukas played in the youth teams of Olympiacos before being promoted to the first team. He was given his first contract by the club and scored his first goal in a pre-season friendly against Viktoria Plzeň. His first league match came on 29 December 2007 against Xanthi.

Following loans to Egaleo, Ethnikos Asteras and SV Werder Bremen II he permanently moved to Werder Bremen II on a free transfer on 30 June 2010.

On 4 August 2013, he signed a contract with Greek Football League club, Iraklis. In July 2014 he signed for Fostiras.

On 11 August 2018, he moved to newly promoted side Aittitos Spata on a free transfer.

== International career ==
Matsoukas was a member of Greece U19.
