= Aiginiakos F.C. =

Aiginiakos
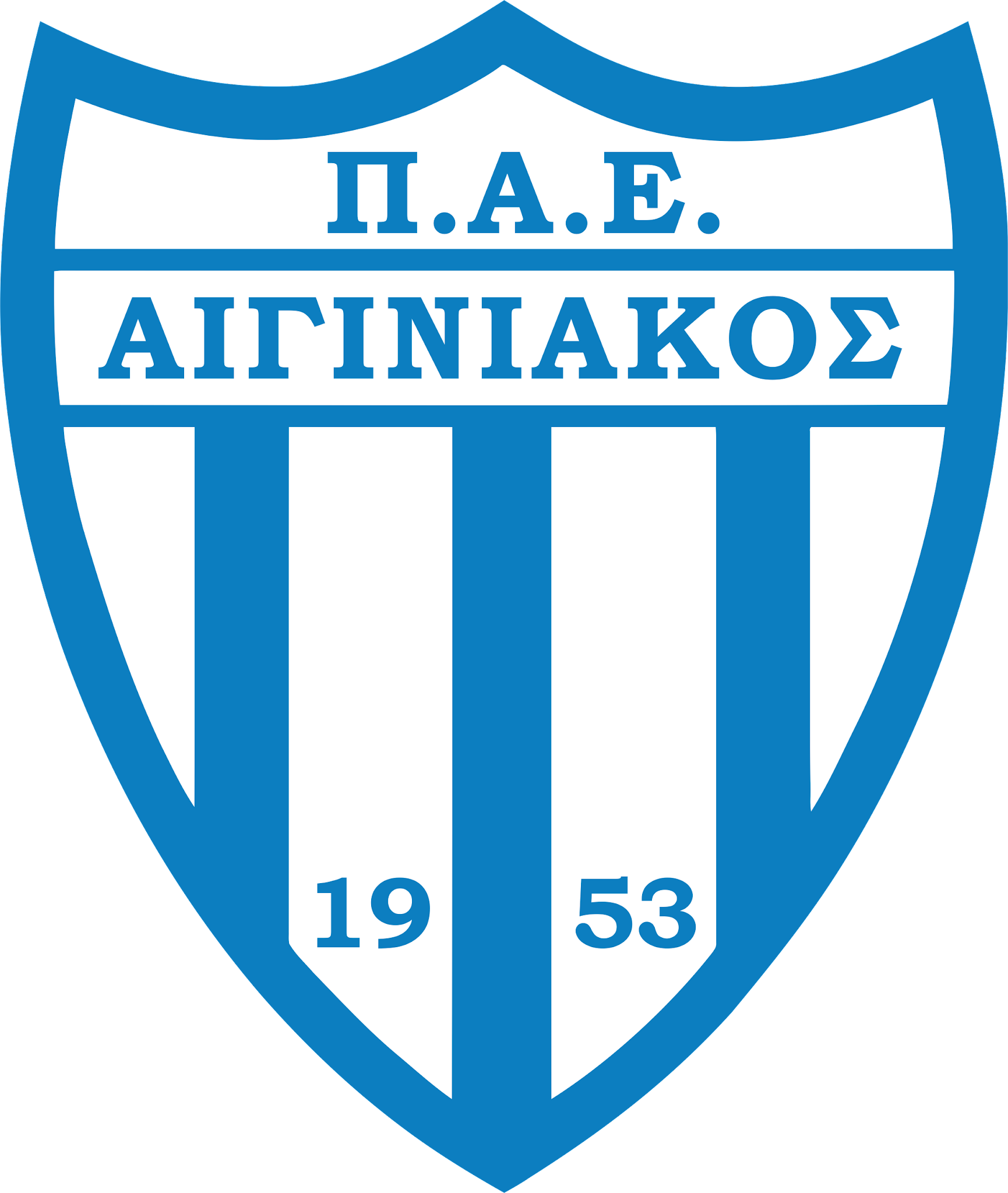
- Full name: Aiginiakos Football Club
- Founded: 1953; 73 years ago
- Ground: Municipal Stadium "Giannis Paralikidis"
- Capacity: 1,000
- Chairman: Michalis Kissoudis
- Manager: Georgios Damtsios
- League: Pieria FCA First Division
- 2025–26: Pieria FCA First Division, 6th
Home colours	Away colours

Aiginiakos Football Club (Greek: Αιγινιακός Π.Α.) is a Greek professional football club based in Aiginio, Pieria, Greece. It plays its home matches at the Municipal Stadium "Giannis Paralikidis".

== History ==
Aiginiakos is a club in Aiginio, a town in the prefecture of Pieria. The colors of Aeginian are blue and white. Initially, the club came from the merger of two groups, Ethnikos and Digenis, in 1953. The headquarters of Aiginiakos are the municipal stadium "Giannis Paralikidis."

In the 1975–76 season, Aiginiakos came very close to the Beta Ethniki (second division), since in the special championship among the first teams from four prefectures he reached the source, but water did not drink as in the crucial match at Aiginio with Niki Polygyros defeated 0–2 at the same time he lost the ticket for the Beta Ethniki. In the 1977–78 season, Aiginiakos took 4th place in the championship of the Delta Ethniki. In the year 1986–87, he rose to Delta Ethniki, prevailing at the barracks of the Ghost Petrosa. In the period 1987–88, he managed to stay in the Delta Ethniki by winning Achilleas Triandrias in Polykastro in a barrage match. The next season, after an excellent presence, Gamma Ethniki (1989) passed the threshold of professional football, the greatest distinction in the history of the club. Notable is the presence of the team in the championship of Delta Ethniki, where it had a total of 13 years.

Aiginiakos appeared in Gamma Ethniki's Northern Group in 1989–90, but finished the season in the last place and was relegated to the regional championship.

In 2012, Aiginiakos lifted the Pieria FCA Cup after beating AE Peristasi 1–0 in the final and were supposed to play in the 2012–13 Delta Ethniki after having ended first in the A' Division of the local Pieria championships. However, they took the place of fellow Pieria-based club Platamon Academy in the Football League 2; the latter were Group 3 champions in the 2011–12 Delta Ethniki but could not obtain a professional licence to play in the 2012–13 Football League 2. They merged with Platamón FC and got the licence they needed. In the Football League 2, things were easy for the teams, as they knew that the top five teams would be promoted to the Football League. Aiginiakos got 4th place with ease, and were promoted to the Football League for the first time in their history.

In the 2023–24 season, the club won the Pieria FCA championship and qualified for the 2024 Greek Football Amateur Championship special promotion play-offs. Although they failed to secure one of the top three promotion spots leading directly to Gamma Ethniki, they earned promotion as runner-up replacements due to a vacant spot created in the division. During the 2024–25 season, Aiginiakos lost out on survival in a head-to-head tiebreaker with Kozani, resulting in relegation back to the local regional league.

== Honours ==
=== Domestic ===
Since 1996

==== Leagues ====
- Gamma Ethniki
  - Winners (1): 2015–16
- Pieria Football Clubs Association Championship
  - Winners (5): 1995–96, 1998–99, 2001–02, 2011–12, 2023–24
- Pieria Football Clubs Association Cup
  - Winners (1): 2011–12

== Records ==
=== Most club appearances ===
Rank	Name	Apps
1	(Greece) Athanasios Tolios	92
2	(Greece) Panagiotis Giazitzoglou	88
3	(Greece) Nikolaos Zourkos	82
4	(Greece) Vasilios Liolios	79
5	(Argentina) Marcelo Penta	64

== Affiliated clubs ==
- (Greece) PAOK
