= 2013–14 Episkopi F.C. season =

Episkopi
2013–14 season
- Chairman: Michalis Nikolidakis
- Manager: Kostas Anifantakis
- Stadium: Gallos Stadium; Gallou, Rethymno, Greece
- Football League: 11th
- Greek Cup: 1st Round (eliminated)
- Top goalscorer: League: Dimitris Soubasakis (3 goals); All: Gastón Germán González; Dimitris Soubasakis (3 goals)
Home colours	Away colours

The 2013–14 season was Episkopi first season in Football League. They also competed in the Greek Cup.

The club has made 11 appearances in the Delta Ethniki, where they have been playing continuously since 2003. In 2012, they were promoted to Football League 2 for the first time in their history as champions of Delta Ethniki's 10th Group.

== Players ==
=== Current squad ===
No.	Name	Nationality	Position(s)	Date of Birth (Age)	Signed from	Notes
Goalkeepers
1	Odysseas Kelaidis	(Greece)	GK	6 March 1990 (23)	(Greece) OFI amateurs	
93	Antonis Kelaidis	(Greece)	GK	31 March 1993 (20)	(Greece) Panetolikos U20	
31	Manolis Kalogerakis	(Greece)	GK	12 March 1992 (21)	(Greece) Doxa Drama	
18	Akis Lampropoulos	(Greece)	GK	22 August 1989 (24)	(Greece) Glyfada	
Defenders
4	Markos Lionakis	(Greece)	DF	11 September 1993 (20)	(Greece) Kissamikos	
13	Nikos Botonakis	(Greece)	DF	11 May 1989 (24)	(Greece) Chania	
2	Rafail Marathianos	(Greece)	DF	17 March 1993 (20)	(Greece) PE Rethymnou	
17	Eugenios Kononenko	(Ukraine)	DF	8 October 1992 (21)	(Greece) Platanias U20	
3	Giorgos Vidalis	(Greece)	DF	7 October 1987 (26)	(Greece) PAEEK FC	
21	Dimitrios Spatharas	(Greece)	DF	16 May 1987 (26)	(Greece) Anagennisi Giannitsa	
Midfielders
8	Stelios Delibasis	(Greece)	DM	4 December 1987 (26)	(Greece) Iraklis Psachna	
7	Dimitris Soubasakis	(Greece)	DM	21 December 1988 (25)	(Greece) Neos Asteras Rethymno	
26	Christos Vourvaxakis	(Greece)	DM	8 April 1989 (24)	(Greece) Chania	
11	Myronas Anogeianakis	(Greece)	MF	17 November 1990 (23)	(Greece) Rouvas	
10	Božidar Tadić	(Serbia)	MF	14 July 1983 (30)	(Greece) Niki Volos	
30	Alexis Seliniotakis	(Greece)	MF	10 July 1991 (22)	(Greece) Chania	
5	Vangelis Poulakis	(Greece)	MF	1 August 1991 (22)	(Greece) Rouvas	
6	Michalis Fratzeskakis	(Greece)	MF	3 November 1984 (29)	(Greece) Neos Asteras Rethymno	
32	Antonis Manousakis	(Greece)	MF	8 May 1990 (23)	(Greece) Apollon Kalamarias	
28	Gastón Germán González	(Argentina)	MF	23 February 1988 (25)	(Greece) Platanias	
27	Ilias Trixakis	(Greece)	AM	9 August 1993 (20)	(Greece) AO Asi Gonia	
Forwards
9	Stefanos Martsakis	(Greece)	CF	24 May 1990 (23)	(Greece) Platanias	
14	Gaëtan D'Acunto	(France)	CF	10 October 1989 (24)	(Israel) Hapoel Ra'anana	
23	Giorgos Velonakis	(Greece)	FW	5 February 1993 (20)	Youth team	
40	Abdul Diallo	(Burkina Faso)	CF	23 October 1985 (28)	(Greece) Apollon Smyrnis	
34	Jesse Darko	(Austria)	CF	29 November 1993 (20)	(England) Wimbledon	

Source=Episkopi FC Homepage

== Pre-season and friendlies ==
Win Draw Loss

27 July 2013 Friendly	Episkopi (Greece)	0 – 1	(Greece) Kissamikos	Gallou
18:00			[Giovani] 19' (pen.)	Stadium: DAK GALLOU

3 August 2013 Friendly	Apollon Kalamarias (Greece)	1 – 1	(Greece) Episkopi	Naousa
	Thomas Vlachos 57'		Alexis Seliniotakis 47'	Stadium: [Naousa]

7 August 2013 Friendly	Aris Thessaloniki (Greece)	3 – 1	(Greece) Episkopi	Thessaloniki
19:00	Nikos Aggeloudis 57', 81'; Erotokritos Damarlis 78'		Božidar Tadić 49' (pen.)	Stadium: Kleanthis Vikelidis Stadium

11 August 2013 Friendly	OFI (Greece)	3 – 0	(Greece) Episkopi	Heraklion
18:00	Alexandros Perogamvrakis 11'; Carlos Milhazes 33'; Lincoln Zvasiya 72'			Stadium: Theodoros Vardinogiannis Stadium

18 August 2013 Friendly	Episkopi (Greece)	0 – 6	(Greece) Ergotelis	Gallou
17:10			Ioannis Domatas 35', 62'; Māris Verpakovskis 40' (pen.), 85'; Christos Chrysofakis 68'; Ioannis Kiliaras 75'	Stadium: DAK GALLOU

31 August 2013 Friendly	Chania F.C. (Greece)	3 – 1	(Greece) Episkopi	Mournies
17:10	Giorgos Boudopoulos 24'; Kostas Pagalos 45' (pen.); Giannis Loukinas 52'		Božidar Tadić 12'	Stadium: Perivolia Municipal Stadium

6 September 2013 Friendly	Platanias F.C. (Greece)	4 – 0	(Greece) Episkopi	Mournies
18:45	Thomas Nazlidis 14'; Dimitris Popovic 46'; Giorgos Em. Giakoumakis 60', 88'			Stadium: Perivolia Municipal Stadium

== Football League ==
=== League table ===
Pos	Team	Pld	W	D	L	GF	GA	GD	Pts	Qualification or relegation
9	Fokikos	26	11	3	12	33	31	+2	36	
10	Paniliakos	26	10	5	11	30	28	+2	35	
11	Episkopi	26	10	4	12	30	28	+2	34	
12	Asteras Magoula (R)	26	7	6	13	26	36	−10	27	Relegation to Gamma Ethniki
13	Glyfada (R)	26	2	3	21	16	62	−46	9	Relegation to Gamma Ethniki

Source: footballleaguenews.gr
Rules for classification: 1) points, 2) head-to-head points
(R) Relegated

=== Results summary ===
Overall								Home						Away					
Pld	W	D	L	GF	GA	GD	Pts	W	D	L	GF	GA	GD	W	D	L	GF	GA	GD
8	4	2	2	10	6	+4	14	2	2	1	7	5	+2	2	0	1	3	1	+2

Source: Matches

==== Results by round ====
Round	1	2	3	4	5	6	7	8	9	10	11	12	13	14	15	16	17	18	19	20	21	22	23	24	25	26
Ground	H	H	A	H	A	H	A	H																		
Result	W	D	W	W	W	L	L	D																		
Position	10	13	8	2	1	3	3	5																		

Updated to match(es) played on 20 November 2013. Source: Competitive matches
A = Away; H = Home; W = Win; D = Draw; L = Loss

=== Matches ===
30 September 2013 1	Episkopi F.C.	3 – 0	Fostiras	Gallou
16:00	Dimitrios Spatharas (yellow card) 21'; Dimitris Soubasakis 24', (substituted off) 79'; Antonis Manousakis 27'; Giorgos Velonakis (red card); Vaggelis Poulakis (substituted off) 39'; Alexis Seliniotakis (substituted on) 39'; Božidar Tadić (substituted off) 71'; Jesse Darko (substituted on) 71', (yellow card) 89'; Stefanos Martsakis (substituted on) 79'; Stelios Delibasis 82'	Report	Stelios Makridis (substituted off) 46'; Alexandros Secholari (substituted on) 46', (yellow card) 61'; Giannis Kargas (substituted off) 68'; Christos Tasoulis (substituted on) 68'; Dionysis Giannoulis (substituted off) 68'; Sotiris Leontiou (substituted on) 68'; Ilias Kakaras (yellow card) 91'	Stadium: DAK GALLOU; Referee: Aristotelis Diamantopoulos

6 October 2013 2	Episkopi F.C.	2 – 2	Iraklis Psachna F.C.	Gallou
15:30	Stelios Delibasis (yellow card) 34'; Stefanos Martsakis (yellow card) 47'; Gastón Germán González 55', 62'	Report	Daniel Gbaguidi (yellow card) 30'; Dimitrios Kiliaras 31', 84'; Athanasios Paleologos (yellow card) 62'	Stadium: DAK GALLOU; Referee: Christos Andronikidis

13 October 2013 3	Acharnaikos F.C.	0 – 1	Episkopi F.C.	Acharnes (Menidi)
16:00	Paraskevas Andralas (yellow card) 36'; Igor Mirčeta (yellow card) 52'; Shannon Welcome (yellow card) 76'; Stavros Manalis (yellow card) 84'; Efstathios Provatidis (yellow card) 86'	Report	Jesse Darko (yellow card) 30'; Stelios Delibasis 67'; Giorgos Vidalis (yellow card) 34' (yellow-red card) 69'; Christos Vourvaxakis (yellow card) 62'; Gaëtan D'Acunto (yellow card) 88'; Manolis Kalogerakis (yellow card) 90'	Stadium: Acharnes Stadium; Referee: Georgios Tzovaras

20 October 2013 4	Episkopi F.C.	2 – 0	Vyzas F.C.	Gallou
16:00	Alexis Seliniotakis (yellow card) 33'; Jesse Darko 45'; Dimitris Soubasakis 54'	Report	Andreas Mandilis (yellow card) 84'	Stadium: DAK GALLOU; Referee: Giorgos Michailidis

26 October 2013 5	Glyfada F.C.	0 – 2	Episkopi F.C.	Kaisariani
16:00	Kosmas Gezos (yellow card) 30'; Alexandros Smirlis (yellow card) 58' (yellow-red card) 60'; Franck Songo'o (yellow card) 70'	Report	Gastón Germán González (yellow card) 28'; Manolis Kalogerakis (yellow card) 30'; Stelios Delibasis (yellow card) 68'; Christos Vourvaxakis (yellow card) 78'; Stefanos Martsakis 80'; Dimitris Soubasakis 87'	Stadium: Kaisariani Stadium; Referee: Alexandros Tsamouris

3 November 2013 6	Episkopi F.C.	0 – 3	Asteras Magoula F.C.	Gallou
15:00	Alexis Seliniotakis (yellow card) 45+2'; Dimitrios Spatharas (yellow card) 62'; Giorgos Vidalis (yellow card) 86'	Report	Giannis Marinou 25'; Petros Dimitriadis 29'; Andreas Kornelatos (yellow card) 35', (goal) 70'; Vasilis Triantos (yellow card) 74'	Stadium: DAK GALLOU; Referee: Ioannis Neofotiadis

10 November 2013 7	Kallithea F.C.	1 – 0	Episkopi F.C.	Kallithea
				Stadium: Gregoris Lambrakis Stadium

17 November 2013 8	Episkopi F.C.	0 – 0	Chania F.C.	Gallou
				Stadium: DAK GALLOU

24 November 2013 9	Fokikos F.C.	v	Episkopi F.C.	Amfissa
				Stadium: Amfissa Municipal Stadium

1 December 2013 10	Panachaiki F.C.	v	Episkopi F.C.	Patras
				Stadium: Pampeloponnisiako Stadium

8 December 2013 11	Episkopi F.C.	v	Olympiacos Volos	Gallou
				Stadium: DAK GALLOU

15 December 2013 12	Paniliakos F.C.	v	Episkopi F.C.	Pyrgos
				Stadium: Pirgos Municipal Stadium

22 December 2013 13	Episkopi F.C.	v	Panegialios F.C.	Gallou
				Stadium: DAK GALLOU

== Greek Football Cup ==
=== First round ===
15 September 2013	Asteras Magoula	2–1	Episkopi	Eleusis Municipal Stadium
16:00	Kapouranis 67'; Martínez 74'		83' (pen.) González	Referee: Simeon Kosikidis (Athens)

== Statistics ==
=== Goal scorers ===
No.	Pos.	Nation	Name	Football League Greece	Greek Cup	Total
7	MF	(Greece)	Dimitris Soubasakis	3	0	3
28	MF	(Argentina)	Gastón Germán González	2	1	3
8	MF	(Greece)	Stelios Delibasis	2	0	2
32	MF	(Greece)	Antonis Manousakis	1	0	1
2	FW	(Austria)	Jesse Darko	1	0	1
9	FW	(Greece)	Stefanos Martsakis	1	0	1
TOTAL				10	1	11

Source=Soccerway
Last updated: 26 October 2013

=== Disciplinary record ===
Number	Nation	Position	Name	Football League Greece		Greek Cup		Total	
Number	Nation	Position	Name	Yellow card	Red card	Yellow card	Red card	Yellow card	Red card
1	(Greece)	GK	Odysseas Kelaidis	0	0	0	0	0	0
2	(Greece)	DF	Rafail Marathianos	0	0	0	0	0	0
3	(Greece)	DF	Giorgos Vidalis	2	1	0	0	2	1
5	(Greece)	MF	Vangelis Poulakis	0	0	0	0	0	0
6	(Greece)	MF	Michalis Fratzeskakis	0	0	0	0	0	0
7	(Greece)	MF	Dimitris Soubasakis	0	0	0	0	0	0
8	(Greece)	MF	Stelios Delibasis	2	0	0	0	2	0
9	(Greece)	MF	Stefanos Martsakis	0	0	0	0	0	0
10	(Serbia)	MF	Božidar Tadić	0	0	0	0	0	0
11	(Greece)	MF	Myronas Anogeianakis	0	0	0	0	0	0
12	(Greece)	DF	Nikos Michelidakis	0	0	0	0	0	0
13	(Greece)	DF	Nikos Botonakis	0	0	0	0	0	0
14	(France)	FW	Gaëtan D'Acunto	1	0	0	0	1	0
17	(Ukraine)	DF	Eugenios Kononenko	0	0	0	0	0	0
18	(Greece)	GK	Akis Lampropoulos	0	0	0	0	0	0
21	(Greece)	DF	Dimitrios Spatharas	1	0	0	0	1	0
23	(Greece)	FW	Giorgos Velonakis	0	1	0	0	0	1
26	(Greece)	MF	Christos Vourvaxakis	2	0	0	0	2	0
27	(Greece)	MF	Ilias Trixakis	0	0	0	0	0	0
28	(Argentina)	MF	Gastón Germán González	1	0	0	0	1	0
30	(Greece)	MF	Alexis Seliniotakis	2	0	0	0	2	0
31	(Greece)	GK	Manolis Kalogerakis	1	0	0	0	1	0
32	(Greece)	MF	Antonis Manousakis	0	0	0	0	0	0
34	(Austria)	FW	Jesse Darko	1	0	0	0	1	0
40	(Burkina Faso)	FW	Abdul Diallo	0	0	0	0	0	0
93	(Greece)	GK	Antonis Kelaidis	0	0	0	0	0	0
			TOTALS	13	2	0	0	13	2

Last Updated: 13 November 2013
