= Greek football PSAP awards =

Greek football awards

The Greek football PSAPP awards are a number of awards given annually by the Panhellenic Association of Professional Football Players (PSAPP) (Greek: Πανελλήνιος Σύνδεσμος Αμειβομένων Ποδοσφαιριστών Ποδοσφαιριστριών). These awards are given annually to players playing in the Super League Greece, Super League Greece 2 and in the Greek A Division. Until 2021, they were also given to players from the Greek third division. Managers and referees are also awarded by PSAPP on an annual basis.

== Super League Greece Awards ==
=== Best Greek Player of the Season Award ===
Season	Winner(s)	Club(s)	Source
1988–89	Spyros Ikonomopoulos	AEK Athens	
1991–92	Stratos Apostolakis	Panathinaikos	
1992–93	Stelios Manolas; Nikos Nioplias	AEK Athens; Panathinaikos	
1993–94	Alexis Alexandris	AEK Athens	
1994–95	Georgios Georgiadis; Michalis Kasapis; Georgios Skartados	Panathinaikos; AEK Athens; Iraklis	
1995–96	Georgios Donis; Vassilis Karapialis; Vasilios Tsiartas	Panathinaikos; Olympiacos; AEK Athens	
1996–97	Christos Kostis; Demis Nikolaidis; Kostas Frantzeskos	AEK Athens; AEK Athens; PAOK	
1997–98	Demis Nikolaidis (2)	AEK Athens	
1998–99	Grigoris Georgatos	Olympiacos	
1999–2000	Nikos Liberopoulos	Panathinaikos	
2000–01	Alexis Alexandris (2)	Olympiacos	
2001–02	Demis Nikolaidis (3)	AEK Athens	
2002–03	Stelios Giannakopoulos	Olympiacos	
2003–04	Dimitrios Papadopoulos	Panathinaikos	
2004–05	Kostas Katsouranis	AEK Athens	
2005–06	Ieroklis Stoltidis; Nikos Liberopoulos (2)	Olympiacos; AEK Athens	
2006–07	Nikos Liberopoulos (3)	AEK Athens	
2007–08	Dimitris Salpingidis	Panathinaikos	
2008–09	Dimitris Salpingidis (2)	Panathinaikos	
2009–10	Vasilis Torosidis	Olympiacos	
2010–11	Avraam Papadopoulos	Olympiacos	
2011–12	Kostas Mitroglou	Atromitos	
2012–13	Dimitrios Papadopoulos (2)	Panthrakikos	
2013–14	Dimitrios Papadopoulos (3)	Atromitos	
2014–15	Nikos Kaltsas	Veria	
2015–16	Kostas Fortounis	Olympiacos	
2016–17	Petros Mantalos	AEK Athens	
2017–18	Lazaros Christodoulopoulos	AEK Athens	
2018–19	Kostas Fortounis (2)	Olympiacos	
2019–20	Kostas Tsimikas	Olympiacos	
2020–21	Georgios Masouras	Olympiacos	
2021–22	Georgios Masouras (2)	Olympiacos	
2022–23	Fotis Ioannidis	Panathinaikos	
2023–24	Fotis Ioannidis (2)	Panathinaikos	
2024–25	Giannis Konstantelias	PAOK	
2025–26	Giannis Konstantelias (2)	PAOK	

==== By player ====
Player	Total	Seasons
Demis Nikolaidis	3	1996–97, 1997–98, 2001–02
Nikos Liberopoulos	3	1999–2000, 2005–06, 2006–07
Dimitrios Papadopoulos	3	2003–04, 2012–13, 2013–14
Alexis Alexandris	2	1993–94, 2000–01
Dimitris Salpingidis	2	2007–08, 2008–09
Kostas Fortounis	2	2015–16, 2018–19
Georgios Masouras	2	2020–21, 2021–22
Fotis Ioannidis	2	2022–23, 2023–24
Giannis Konstantelias	2	2024–25, 2025–26
Spyros Ikonomopoulos	1	1988–89
Stratos Apostolakis	1	1991–92
Stelios Manolas	1	1992–93
Nikos Nioplias	1	1992–93
Georgios Georgiadis	1	1994–95
Georgios Skartados	1	1994–95
Michalis Kasapis	1	1994–95
Georgios Donis	1	1995–96
Vassilis Karapialis	1	1995–96
Vasilios Tsiartas	1	1995–96
Christos Kostis	1	1996–97
Kostas Frantzeskos	1	1996–97
Grigoris Georgatos	1	1998–99
Stelios Giannakopoulos	1	2002–03
Kostas Katsouranis	1	2004–05
Ieroklis Stoltidis	1	2005–06
Vasilis Torosidis	1	2009–10
Avraam Papadopoulos	1	2010–11
Kostas Mitroglou	1	2011–12
Nikos Kaltsas	1	2014–15
Petros Mantalos	1	2016–17
Lazaros Christodoulopoulos	1	2017–18
Kostas Tsimikas	1	2019–20

==== By club ====
Club	Players	Wins	Seasons
AEK Athens	10	14	1988–89, 1992–93, 1993–94, 1994–95, 1995–96, 1996–97 (twice), 1997–98, 2001–02, 2004–05, 2005–06, 2006–07, 2016–17, 2017–18
Olympiacos	10	12	1995–96, 1998–99, 2000–01, 2002–03, 2005–06, 2009–10, 2010–11, 2015–16, 2018–19, 2019–20, 2020–21, 2021–22
Panathinaikos	8	10	1991–92, 1992–93, 1994–95, 1995–96, 1999–2000, 2003–04, 2007–08, 2008–09, 2022–23, 2023–24
PAOK	2	3	1996–97, 2024–25, 2025–26
Atromitos	2	2	2011–12, 2013–14
Iraklis	1	1	1994–95
Panthrakikos	1	1	2012–13
Veria	1	1	2014–15

=== Best Foreign Player of the Season Award ===
Season	Winner(s)	Club(s)	Source
1991–92	(North Macedonia) Toni Savevski	AEK Athens	
1992–93	(Poland) Krzysztof Warzycha	Panathinaikos	
1993–94	(Poland) Krzysztof Warzycha (2)	Panathinaikos	
1994–95	(Poland) Krzysztof Warzycha (3)	Panathinaikos	
1995–96	(Georgia (country)) Temur Ketsbaia	AEK Athens	
1996–97	(Poland) Krzysztof Warzycha (4)	Panathinaikos	
1997–98	(Poland) Krzysztof Warzycha (5)	Panathinaikos	
1998–99	(Cyprus) Siniša Gogić	Olympiacos	
1999–2000	(Brazil) Giovanni	Olympiacos	
2000–01	(Serbia) Predrag Đorđević	Olympiacos	
2001–02	(Serbia) Predrag Đorđević (2)	Olympiacos	
2002–03	(Serbia) Predrag Đorđević (3)	Olympiacos	
2003–04	(Brazil) Giovanni (2) (Germany) Markus Münch	Olympiacos; Panathinaikos	
2004–05	(Brazil) Luciano	Skoda Xanthi	
2005–06	(Brazil) Rivaldo	Olympiacos	
2006–07	(Brazil) Rivaldo (2)	Olympiacos	
2007–08	(Serbia) Darko Kovačević (Argentina) Ismael Blanco	Olympiacos; AEK Athens	
2008–09	(Argentina) Luciano Galletti	Olympiacos	
2009–10	(France) Djibril Cissé	Panathinaikos	
2010–11	(Portugal) Vieirinha	PAOK	
2011–12	(Belgium) Kevin Mirallas	Olympiacos	
2012–13	(Spain) Rubén Rayos	Asteras Tripolis	
2013–14	(Sweden) Marcus Berg	Panathinaikos	
2014–15	(Argentina) Alejandro Domínguez	Olympiacos	
2015–16	(Sweden) Marcus Berg (2)	Panathinaikos	
2016–17	(Sweden) Marcus Berg (3)	Panathinaikos	
2017–18	(Egypt) Amr Warda	Atromitos	
2018–19	(Portugal) Vieirinha (2)	PAOK	
2019–20	(Morocco) Youssef El-Arabi	Olympiacos	
2020–21	(Morocco) Youssef El-Arabi (2)	Olympiacos	
2021–22	(Argentina) Sebastian Palacios	Panathinaikos	
2022–23	(Mexico) Orbelín Pineda	AEK Athens	
2023–24	(Morocco) Ayoub El Kaabi	Olympiacos	
2024–25	(Morocco) Ayoub El Kaabi (2)	Olympiacos	
2025–26	(Mexico) Orbelín Pineda (2)	AEK Athens	

==== By player ====
Player	Total	Seasons
(Poland) Krzysztof Warzycha	5	1992–93, 1993–94, 1994–95, 1996–97, 1997–98
(Serbia) Predrag Đorđević	3	2000–01, 2001–02, 2002–03
(Sweden) Marcus Berg	3	2013–14, 2015–16, 2016–17
(Brazil) Giovanni	2	1999–2000, 2003–04
(Brazil) Rivaldo	2	2005–06, 2006–07
(Portugal) Vieirinha	2	2010–11, 2018–19
(Morocco) Youssef El-Arabi	2	2019–20, 2020–21
(Morocco) Ayoub El Kaabi	2	2023–24, 2024–25
(Mexico) Orbelin Pineda	2	2022–23, 2025–26
(North Macedonia) Toni Savevski	1	1991–92
(Georgia (country)) Temur Ketsbaia	1	1995–96
(Cyprus) Siniša Gogić	1	1998–99
(Germany) Markus Münch	1	2003–04
(Brazil) Luciano	1	2004–05
(Serbia) Darko Kovačević	1	2007–08
(Argentina) Ismael Blanco	1	2007–08
(Argentina) Luciano Galletti	1	2008–09
(France) Djibril Cissé	1	2009–10
(Belgium) Kevin Mirallas	1	2011–12
(Spain) Rubén Rayos	1	2012–13
(Argentina) Alejandro Domínguez	1	2014–15
(Egypt) Amr Warda	1	2017–18
(Argentina) Sebastian Palacios	1	2021–22

==== By club ====
Club	Players	Wins	Seasons
Olympiacos	10	16	1998–99, 1999–2000, 2000–01, 2001–02, 2002–03, 2003–04, 2005–06, 2006–07, 2007–08, 2008–09, 2011–12, 2014–15, 2019–20, 2020–21, 2023–24, 2024–25
Panathinaikos	11	11	1992–93, 1993–94, 1994–95, 1996–97, 1997–98, 2003–04, 2009–10, 2013–14, 2015–16, 2016–17, 2021–22
AEK Athens	4	5	1991–92, 1995–96, 2007–08, 2022–23, 2025–26
PAOK	1	2	2010–11, 2018–19
Xanthi	1	1	2004–05
Asteras Tripolis	1	1	2012–13
Atromitos	1	1	2017–18

==== By country ====
Country	Players	Wins	Seasons
Poland	1	5	1992–93, 1993–94, 1994–95, 1996–97, 1997–98
Brazil	4	5	1999–2000, 2003–04, 2004–05, 2005–06, 2006–07
Serbia	2	4	2000–01, 2001–02, 2002–03, 2007–08
Morocco	2	4	2019–20, 2020–21, 2023–24, 2024–25
Argentina	4	4	2007–08, 2008–09, 2014–15, 2021–22
Sweden	1	3	2013–14, 2015–16, 2016–17
Portugal	1	2	2010–11, 2018–19
Mexico	1	2	2022–23, 2025–26
North Macedonia	1	1	1991–92
Georgia	1	1	1995–96
Cyprus	1	1	1998–99
Germany	1	1	2003–04
France	1	1	2009–10
Belgium	1	1	2011–12
Spain	1	1	2012–13
Egypt	1	1	2017–18

=== Best Young Player of the Season Award ===
Season	Winner(s)	Club(s)	Source
1988–89	(Greece) Spyros Marangos	Panionios	
1991–92	(Greece) Christos Kostis	Iraklis	
1992–93	(Greece) Nikos Machlas	OFI	
1993–94	(Greece) Georgios Georgiadis (Greece) Michalis Kasapis	Panathinaikos; AEK Athens	
1994–95	(Greece) Demis Nikolaidis	Apollon Athens	
1995–96	(Greece) Nikos Liberopoulos	Kalamata	
1996–97	(Greece) Dimitrios Eleftheropoulos	Olympiacos	
1997–98	(Greece) Giorgos Karagounis (Greece) Pantelis Konstantinidis (Greece) Paraskevas Antzas	Apollon Athens; Apollon Athens; Skoda Xanthi	
1998–99	(Greece) Nikos Iordanidis	OFI	
1999–2000	(Greece) Christos Patsatzoglou (Greece) Kostas Katsouranis	Skoda Xanthi; Panachaiki	
2000–01	(Greece) Giourkas Seitaridis	Panathinaikos	
2001–02	(Greece) Spyros Vallas	Skoda Xanthi	
2002–03	(Greece) Vangelis Mantzios	Panionios	
2003–04	(Greece) Alexandros Tziolis	Panionios	
2004–05	(Greece) Panagiotis Lagos	Iraklis	
2005–06	(Greece) Panagiotis Lagos (2)	Iraklis	
2006–07	(Greece) Sotiris Ninis	Panathinaikos	
2007–08	(Greece) Sokratis Papastathopoulos	AEK Athens	
2008–09	(Greece) Vasilios Koutsianikoulis	Ergotelis	
2009–10	(Greece) Sotiris Ninis (2)	Panathinaikos	
2010–11	(Greece) Giannis Fetfatzidis	Olympiacos	
2011–12	(Greece) Panagiotis Vlachodimos	Skoda Xanthi	
2012–13	(Albania) Ergys Kaçe	PAOK	
2013–14	(Greece) Dimitris Kolovos	Panionios	
2014–15	(Greece) Charis Charisis	PAS Giannina	
2015–16	(Greece) Charis Charisis (2)	PAOK	
2016–17	(Greece) Panagiotis Retsos	Olympiacos	
2017–18	(Greece) Anastasios Douvikas	Asteras Tripolis	
2018–19	(Greece) Giannis Bouzoukis	Panathinaikos	
2019–20	(Greece) Dimitrios Emmanouilidis	Panionios	
2020–21	(Greece) Christos Tzolis	PAOK	
2021–22	(Greece) Sotiris Alexandropoulos	Panathinaikos	
2022–23	(Greece) Giannis Konstantelias	PAOK	
2023–24	(Greece) Giannis Konstantelias (2)	PAOK	
2024–25	(Greece) Christos Mouzakitis	Olympiacos	
2025–26	(Greece) Sotiris Kontouris	Panetolikos / Panathinaikos	

==== By club ====
Club	Players	Wins	Seasons
Panathinaikos	6	7	1993–94, 2000–01, 2006–07, 2009–10, 2018–19, 2021–22, 2025–26
Panionios	5	5	1988–89, 1996–97, 2003–04, 2013–14, 2019–20
PAOK	4	5	2012–13, 2015–16, 2020–21, 2022–23, 2023–24
Xanthi	4	4	1997–98, 1999–2000, 2001–02, 2011-12
Olympiacos	4	4	2002–03, 2010–11, 2016–17, 2024–25
Apollon Smyrnis	3	3	1994–95, 1997–98 (twice)
Iraklis	2	3	1991–92, 2004–05, 2005–06
OFI	2	2	1992–93, 1998–99
AEK Athens	2	2	1993–94, 2007–08
Kalamata	1	1	1995–96
Panachaiki	1	1	1999–2000
Ergotelis	1	1	2008–09
Asteras Tripolis	1	1	2012–13
PAS Giannina	1	1	2014–15
Panetolikos	1	1	2025–26

=== Best Goalkeeper of the Season Award ===
Season	Winner	Club	Source
1997–98	(Greece) Ilias Atmatsidis	AEK Athens	
1998–99	(Greece) Ilias Atmatsidis (2)	AEK Athens	
1999–2000	(Greece) Antonios Nikopolidis	Panathinaikos	
2000–01	(Greece) Vangelis Pourliotopoulos	Panionios	
2001–02	(Greece) Antonios Nikopolidis (2)	Panathinaikos	
2002–03	(Greece) Antonios Nikopolidis (3)	Panathinaikos	
2003–04	(Greece) Antonios Nikopolidis (4)	Panathinaikos	
2004–05	(Greece) Antonios Nikopolidis (5)	Olympiacos	
2005–06	(Greece) Antonios Nikopolidis (6)	Olympiacos	
2006–07	(Poland) Arkadiusz Malarz	Skoda Xanthi	
2007–08	(Greece) Antonios Nikopolidis (7)	Olympiacos	
2008–09	(Greece) Antonios Nikopolidis (8)	Olympiacos	
2009–10	(Greece) Michalis Sifakis	Aris	
2010–11	(Greece) Michalis Sifakis (2)	Aris	
2011–12	(Greece) Orestis Karnezis	Panathinaikos	
2012–13	(Greece) Orestis Karnezis (2)	Panathinaikos	
2013–14	(Spain) Roberto	Olympiacos	
2014–15	(Greece) Markos Vellidis	PAS Giannina	
2015–16	(Spain) Roberto (2)	Olympiacos	
2016–17	(Greece) Andreas Gianniotis	Panionios	
2017–18	(Greece) Andreas Gianniotis (2)	Atromitos	
2018–19	(Greece) Alexandros Paschalakis	PAOK	
2019–20	(Portugal) José Sá	Olympiacos	
2020–21	(Greece) Sokratis Dioudis	Panathinaikos	
2021–22	(Russia) Yuri Lodygin	PAS Giannina	
2022–23	(Italy) Alberto Brignoli	Panathinaikos	
2023–24	(Croatia) Dominik Kotarski	PAOK	
2024–25	(Greece) Konstantinos Tzolakis	Olympiacos	
2025–26	(Albania) Thomas Strakosha	AEK Athens	

==== By player ====
Player	Total	Seasons
(Greece) Antonios Nikopolidis	8	1999–2000, 2001–02, 2002–03, 2003–04, 2004–05, 2005–06, 2007–08, 2008–09,
(Greece) Ilias Atmatsidis	2	1997–98, 1998–99
(Greece) Michalis Sifakis	2	2009–10, 2010–11
(Greece) Orestis Karnezis	2	2011–12, 2012–13
(Spain) Roberto	2	2013–14, 2015–16
(Greece) Andreas Gianniotis	2	2016–17, 2017–18
(Greece) Vangelis Pourliotopoulos	1	2000–01
(Poland) Arkadiusz Malarz	1	2006–07
(Greece) Markos Vellidis	1	2014–15
(Greece) Alexandros Paschalakis	1	2018–19
(Portugal) José Sá	1	2019–20
(Greece) Sokratis Dioudis	1	2020–21
(Russia) Yuri Lodygin	1	2021–22
(Italy) Alberto Brignoli	1	2022–23
(Croatia) Dominik Kotarski	1	2023–24
(Greece) Konstantinos Tzolakis	1	2024–25
(Albania) Thomas Strakosha	1	2025–26

==== By club ====
Club	Players	Wins	Seasons
Panathinaikos	4	8	1999–2000, 2001–02, 2002–03, 2003–04, 2011–12, 2012–13, 2020–21, 2022–23
Olympiacos	4	8	2004–05, 2005–06, 2007–08, 2008–09, 2013–14, 2015–16, 2019–20, 2024–25
AEK Athens	2	3	1997–98, 1998–99, 2025–26
Panionios	2	2	2000–01, 2016–17
Aris	1	2	2009–10, 2010–11
PAS Giannina	2	2	2014–15, 2021–22
PAOK	2	2	2018–19, 2023–24
Xanthi	1	1	2006–07
Atromitos	1	1	2017–18

==== By country ====
Country	Players	Wins	Seasons
Greece	10	21	1997–98, 1998–99, 1999–2000, 2000–01, 2001–02, 2002–03, 2003–04, 2004–05, 2005–06, 2007–08, 2008–09, 2009–10, 2010–11, 2011–12, 2012–13, 2014–15, 2016–17, 2017–18, 2018–19, 2020–21, 2024–25
Spain	1	2	2013–14, 2015–16
Poland	1	1	2006–07
Portugal	1	1	2019–20
Russia	1	1	2021–22
Italy	1	1	2022–23
Croatia	1	1	2023–24
Albania	1	1	2025–26

=== Best Manager of the Season Award ===
Season	Winner(s)	Club(s)	Source
1988–89	(Greece) Vasilios Daniil	Olympiacos Volos	
1991–92	(Greece) Christos Archontidis (Greek) (Bosnia and Herzegovina) Dušan Bajević (Foreign)	Apollon Athens; AEK Athens	
1992–93	(Greece) Makis Katsavakis (Greek) (Bosnia and Herzegovina) Dušan Bajević (2) (Foreign)	Edessaikos; AEK Athens	
1993–94	(Greece) Georgios Firos (Greek) (Bosnia and Herzegovina) Dušan Bajević (3) (Foreign)	Aris; AEK Athens	
1994–95	(Greece) Giannis Pathiakakis	Apollon Athens	
1995–96	(Bosnia and Herzegovina) Dušan Bajević (4)	AEK Athens	
1996–97	(Greece) Georgios Paraschos	Kavala	
1997–98	(Bosnia and Herzegovina) Dušan Bajević (5)	Olympiacos	
1998–99	(Bosnia and Herzegovina) Dušan Bajević (6)	Olympiacos	
1999–2000	(Greece) Ioannis Kyrastas	Panathinaikos	
2000–01	(Bosnia and Herzegovina) Dušan Bajević (7)	PAOK	
2001–02	(Portugal) Fernando Santos	AEK Athens	
2002–03	(Bosnia and Herzegovina) Dušan Bajević (8)	AEK Athens	
2003–04	(Greece) Angelos Anastasiadis	PAOK	
2004–05	(Portugal) Fernando Santos (2)	AEK Athens	
2005–06	(Greece) Savvas Kofidis	Iraklis	
2006–07	(Germany) Ewald Lienen	Panionios	
2007–08	(Bosnia and Herzegovina) Dušan Bajević (9)	Aris	
2008–09	(Portugal) Fernando Santos (3)	PAOK	
2009–10	(Portugal) Fernando Santos (4)	PAOK	
2010–11	(Spain) Ernesto Valverde	Olympiacos	
2011–12	(Greece) Georgios Donis (Greek) (Spain) Ernesto Valverde (2) (Foreign)	Atromitos; Olympiacos	
2012–13	(Greece) Giannis Christopoulos	PAS Giannina	
2013–14	(Greece) Yannis Anastasiou	Panathinaikos	
2014–15	(Greece) Giannis Petrakis	PAS Giannina	
2015–16	(Greece) Marinos Ouzounidis	Panionios	
2016–17	(Serbia) Vladimir Ivić	PAOK	
2017–18	(Spain) Manolo Jiménez	AEK Athens	
2018–19	(Romania) Răzvan Lucescu	PAOK	
2019–20	(Portugal) Pedro Martins	Olympiacos	
2020–21	(Portugal) Pedro Martins (2)	Olympiacos	
2021–22	(Serbia) Ivan Jovanović	Panathinaikos	
2022–23	(Argentina) Matías Almeyda	AEK Athens	
2023–24	(Romania) Răzvan Lucescu (2)	PAOK	
2024–25	(Spain) José Luis Mendilibar	Olympiacos	
2025–26	(Serbia) Marko Nikolić	AEK Athens	

==== By manager ====
Manager	Total	Seasons
(Bosnia and Herzegovina) Dušan Bajević	9	1991–92, 1992–93, 1993–94, 1995–96, 1997–98, 1998–99, 2000–01, 2002–03, 2007–08
(Portugal) Fernando Santos	4	2001–02, 2004–05, 2008–09, 2009–10
(Spain) Ernesto Valverde	2	2010–11, 2011–12
(Portugal) Pedro Martins	2	2019–20, 2020–21
(Romania) Răzvan Lucescu	2	2018–19, 2023–24
(Greece) Vasilios Daniil	1	1988–89
(Greece) Christos Archontidis	1	1991–92
(Greece) Makis Katsavakis	1	1992–93
(Greece) Georgios Firos	1	1993–94
(Greece) Giannis Pathiakakis	1	1994–95
(Greece) Georgios Paraschos	1	1996–97
(Greece) Ioannis Kyrastas	1	1999–2000
(Greece) Angelos Anastasiadis	1	2003–04
(Greece) Savvas Kofidis	1	2005–06
(Germany) Ewald Lienen	1	2006–07
(Greece) Georgios Donis	1	2011–12
(Greece) Giannis Christopoulos	1	2012–13
(Greece) Yannis Anastasiou	1	2013–14
(Greece) Giannis Petrakis	1	2014–15
(Greece) Marinos Ouzounidis	1	2015–16
(Serbia) Vladimir Ivić	1	2016–17
(Spain) Manolo Jiménez	1	2017–18
(Serbia) Ivan Jovanović	1	2021–22
(Argentina) Matías Almeyda	1	2022–23
(Spain) José Luis Mendilibar	1	2024–25
(Serbia) Marko Nikolić	1	2025–26

==== By club ====
Club	Managers	Wins	Seasons
AEK Athens	5	10	1991–92, 1992–93, 1993–94, 1995–96, 2001–02, 2002–03, 2004–05, 2017–18, 2022–23, 2025–26
Olympiacos	4	7	1997–98, 1998–99, 2010–11, 2011–12, 2019–20, 2020–21, 2024–25
PAOK	5	7	2000–01, 2003–04, 2008–09, 2009–10, 2016–17, 2018–19, 2023–24
Panathinaikos	3	3	1999–2000, 2013–14, 2021–22
Apollon Smyrnis	2	2	1991–92, 1994–95
Aris	2	2	1993–94, 2007–08
PAS Giannina	2	2	2012–13, 2014–15
Olympiacos Volos	1	1	1988–89
Panionios	1	1	2006–07
Edessaikos	1	1	1992–93
Kavala	1	1	1996–97
Iraklis	1	1	2005–06
Atromitos	1	1	2011–12

==== By country ====
Country	Managers	Wins	Seasons
Greece	14	14	1988–89, 1991–92, 1992–93, 1993–94, 1994–95, 1996–97, 1999–2000, 2003–04, 2005–06, 2011–12, 2012–13, 2013–14, 2014–15, 2015–16
Bosnia and Herzegovina	1	9	1991–92, 1992–93, 1993–94, 1995–96, 1997–98, 1998–99, 2000–01, 2002–03, 2007–08
Portugal	2	6	2001–02, 2004–05, 2008–09, 2009–10, 2019–20, 2020–21
Spain	3	4	2010–11, 2011–12, 2017–18, 2024–25
Serbia	3	3	2016–17, 2021–22, 2025–26
Romania	1	2	2018–19, 2023–24
Germany	1	1	2006–07
Argentina	1	1	2022–23

=== Team of the Season ===
==== 2013–14 ====
Pos.	Player	Club(s)
GK	(Spain) Roberto	Olympiacos
DF	(Brazil) Rodrigo Galo	Panetolikos
DF	(Greece) Nikolaos Lazaridis	Atromitos
DF	(Greece) Stathis Tavlaridis	Atromitos
DF	(Spain) Nano	Panathinaikos
MF	(Spain) Fernando Usero	Asteras Tripolis
MF	(Argentina) Alejandro Domínguez	Olympiacos
MF	(Costa Rica) Joel Campbell	Olympiacos
MF	(Argentina) Javier Umbides	Atromitos
FW	(Greece) Dimitrios Papadopoulos	Atromitos
FW	(Sweden) Marcus Berg	Panathinaikos

==== 2014–15 ====
Pos.	Player	Club(s)
GK	(Greece) Markos Vellidis	PAS Giannina
DF	(Norway) Omar Elabdellaoui	Olympiacos
DF	(Greece) Dimitrios Siovas	Olympiacos
DF	(Greece) Stathis Tavlaridis	Atromitos / Panathinaikos
DF	(France) Arthur Masuaku	Olympiacos
MF	(Portugal) Zeca	Panathinaikos
MF	(Argentina) Alejandro Domínguez	Olympiacos
MF	(Brazil) Cleyton	Skoda Xanthi
MF	(Argentina) Nicolas Martínez	Panetolikos
FW	(Greece) Nikos Karelis	Panathinaikos
FW	(Argentina) Jerónimo Barrales	Asteras Tripolis

==== 2015–16 ====
Pos.	Player	Club(s)
GK	(Spain) Roberto	Olympiacos
DF	(Brazil) Rodrigo Galo	AEK Athens
DF	(Brazil) Rodrigo Moledo	Panathinaikos
DF	(Greece) Georgios Tzavellas	PAOK
DF	(France) Arthur Masuaku	Olympiacos
MF	(Portugal) Zeca	Panathinaikos
MF	(Greece) Manolis Siopis	Panionios
MF	(Cape Verde) Garry Rodrigues	PAOK
MF	(Greece) Anastasios Bakasetas	Panionios
MF	(Greece) Kostas Fortounis	Olympiacos
FW	(Sweden) Marcus Berg	Panathinaikos

==== 2016–17 ====
Pos.	Player	Club(s)
GK	(Greece) Andreas Gianniotis	Panionios
DF	(Brazil) Léo Matos	PAOK
DF	(Greece) Panagiotis Retsos	Olympiacos
DF	(Brazil) Rodrigo Moledo	Panathinaikos
DF	(Greece) Leonardo Koutris	PAS Giannina
MF	(Greece) Zeca	Panathinaikos
MF	(Greece) Manolis Siopis	Panionios
MF	(Iran) Masoud Shojaei	Panionios
MF	(Greece) Petros Mantalos	AEK Athens
MF	(Greece) Kostas Fortounis	Olympiacos
FW	(Sweden) Marcus Berg	Panathinaikos

==== 2017–18 ====
Pos.	Player	Club(s)
GK	(Greece) Andreas Gianniotis	Atromitos
DF	(Brazil) Léo Matos	PAOK
DF	(Ukraine) Dmytro Chyhrynskyi	AEK Athens
DF	(Cape Verde) Fernando Varela	PAOK
DF	(Greece) Dimitris Giannoulis / (Portugal) Vieirinha	Atromitos / PAOK
MF	(Greece) Dimitrios Kourbelis	Panathinaikos
MF	(Portugal) André Simões	AEK Athens
MF	(Greece) Lazaros Christodoulopoulos	AEK Athens
MF	(Egypt) Amr Warda	Atromitos
FW	(Croatia) Marko Livaja	AEK Athens
FW	(Iran) Karim Ansarifard	Olympiacos

==== 2018–19 ====
Pos.	Player	Club(s)
GK	(Greece) Alexandros Paschalakis	PAOK
DF	(Norway) Omar Elabdellaoui	Olympiacos
DF	(Greece) Spyros Risvanis	Atromitos
DF	(Cape Verde) Fernando Varela	PAOK
DF	(Portugal) Vieirinha	PAOK
MF	(Greece) Dimitrios Kourbelis	Panathinaikos
MF	(Brazil) Guilherme	Olympiacos
MF	(Portugal) Daniel Podence	Olympiacos
MF	(Greece) Georgios Masouras	Panionios / Olympiacos
MF	(Greece) Kostas Fortounis	Olympiacos
FW	(Greece) Efthymis Koulouris	Atromitos

==== 2019–20 ====
Pos.	Player	Club(s)
GK	(Portugal) José Sá	Olympiacos
DF	(Norway) Omar Elabdellaoui	Olympiacos
DF	(Portugal) Rúben Semedo	Olympiacos
DF	(Greece) Spyros Risvanis	Atromitos
DF	(Greece) Kostas Tsimikas	Olympiacos
MF	(Greece) Dimitrios Kourbelis	Panathinaikos
MF	(Croatia) Josip Mišić	PAOK
MF	(Greece) Giannis Fetfatzidis	Aris
MF	(France) Mathieu Valbuena	Olympiacos
FW	(Croatia) Marko Livaja	AEK Athens
FW	(Morocco) Youssef El-Arabi	Olympiacos

==== 2020–21 ====
Pos.	Player	Club(s)
GK	(Greece) Sokratis Dioudis	Panathinaikos
DF	(Greece) Giannis Kotsiras	Asteras Tripolis
DF	(Portugal) Rúben Semedo	Olympiacos
DF	(Iceland) Sverrir Ingi Ingason	PAOK
DF	(Argentina) Franco Ferrari	Volos
MF	(Greece) Andreas Bouchalakis	Olympiacos
MF	(France) Yann M'Vila	Olympiacos
MF	(Trinidad and Tobago) Levi García	AEK Athens
MF	(Greece) Georgios Masouras	Olympiacos
FW	(Greece) Anastasios Douvikas	Volos
FW	(Morocco) Youssef El-Arabi	Olympiacos

==== 2021–22 ====
Pos.	Player	Club(s)
GK	(Russia) Yuri Lodygin	PAS Giannina
DF	(Greece) Manolis Saliakas	PAS Giannina
DF	(Senegal) Pape Abou Cissé	Olympiacos
DF	(Greece) Giannis Kargas	PAS Giannina
DF	(Spain) Juankar	Panathinaikos
MF	(Slovenia) Jasmin Kurtić	PAOK
MF	(France) Yann M'Vila	Olympiacos
MF	(Argentina) Sebastián Palacios	Panathinaikos
MF	(Greece) Georgios Masouras	Olympiacos
FW	(Netherlands) Tom van Weert	Volos
FW	(Argentina) Sergio Araujo	AEK Athens

==== 2022–23 ====
Pos.	Player	Club(s)
GK	(Italy) Alberto Brignoli	Panathinaikos
DF	(Brazil) Rodinei	Olympiacos
DF	(Cameroon) Harold Moukoudi	AEK Athens
DF	(Greece) Konstantinos Koulierakis	PAOK
DF	(Iran) Ehsan Hajsafi	AEK Athens
MF	(Spain) Rubén Pérez	Panathinaikos
MF	(Serbia) Mijat Gaćinović	AEK Athens
MF	(Mexico) Orbelin Pineda	AEK Athens
MF	(Greece) Giannis Konstantelias	PAOK
FW	(Greece) Fotis Ioannidis / (Democratic Republic of the Congo) Cédric Bakambu	Panathinaikos / Olympiacos
FW	(Trinidad and Tobago) Levi García	AEK Athens

==== 2023–24 ====
Pos.	Player	Club(s)
GK	(Croatia) Dominik Kotarski	PAOK
DF	(Brazil) Rodinei	Olympiacos
DF	(Croatia) Domagoj Vida	AEK Athens
DF	(Greece) Konstantinos Koulierakis	PAOK
DF	(Ghana) Baba Rahman	PAOK
MF	(Portugal) Chiquinho	Olympiacos
MF	(Greece) Giannis Konstantelias	PAOK
MF	(Sweden) Niclas Eliasson	AEK Athens
MF	(Mexico) Orbelin Pineda	AEK Athens
FW	(Greece) Fotis Ioannidis / (Spain) Loren Morón	Panathinaikos / Aris
FW	(Morocco) Ayoub El Kaabi	Olympiacos

==== 2024–25 ====
Pos.	Player	Club(s)
GK	(Greece) Konstantinos Tzolakis	Olympiacos
DF	(Greece) Georgios Vagiannidis	Panathinaikos
DF	(Greece) Giannis Michailidis	PAOK
DF	(Greece) Panagiotis Retsos	Olympiacos
DF	(Greece) Nikos Athanasiou	Atromitos
MF	(Greece) Christos Mouzakitis	Olympiacos
MF	(Morocco) Azzedine Ounahi	Panathinaikos
MF	(Greece) Giannis Konstantelias	PAOK
MF	(Portugal) Gelson Martins	Olympiacos
FW	(Spain) Loren Morón	Aris
FW	(Morocco) Ayoub El Kaabi	Olympiacos

==== 2025–26 ====
Pos.	Player	Club(s)
GK	(Albania) Thomas Strakosha	AEK Athens
DF	(Greece) Lazaros Rota / (Greece) Triantafyllos Tsapras	AEK Athens / Levadiakos
DF	(Greece) Panagiotis Retsos	Olympiacos
DF	(Portugal) Filipe Relvas	AEK Athens
DF	(Greece) Marios Vichos	Levadiakos
MF	(Serbia) Andrija Živković / (Portugal) Gelson Martins	PAOK / Olympiacos
MF	(Mexico) Orbelín Pineda	AEK Athens
MF	(Romania) Răzvan Marin	AEK Athens
MF	(Greece) Giannis Konstantelias	PAOK
FW	(Greece) Andrews Tetteh / (Morocco) Ayoub El Kaabi	A.E. Kifisia, Panathinaikos / Olympiacos
FW	(Serbia) Luka Jović	AEK Athens

==== Most appearances ====
By player

Player	Appearances	Seasons
(Greece) Giannis Konstantelias	4	2022–23, 2023–24, 2024–25, 2025–26
(Sweden) Marcus Berg	3	2013–14, 2015–16, 2016–17
(Greece) Zeca	3	2014–15, 2015–16, 2016–17
(Norway) Omar Elabdellaoui	3	2014–15, 2018–19, 2019–20
(Greece) Kostas Fortounis	3	2015–16, 2016–17, 2018–19
(Greece) Panagiotis Retsos	3	2016–17, 2024–25, 2025–26
(Greece) Dimitrios Kourbelis	3	2017–18, 2018–19, 2019–20
(Greece) Georgios Masouras	3	2018–19, 2020–21, 2021–22
(Mexico) Orbelin Pineda	3	2022–23, 2023–24, 2025–26
(Morocco) Ayoub El Kaabi	3	2023–24, 2024–25, 2025–26
(Greece) Stathis Tavlaridis	2	2013–14, 2014–15
(Argentina) Alejandro Domínguez	2	2013–14, 2014–15
(Spain) Roberto	2	2013–14, 2015–16
(Brazil) Rodrigo Galo	2	2013–14, 2015–16
(France) Arthur Masuaku	2	2014–15, 2015–16
(Brazil) Rodrigo Moledo	2	2015–16, 2016–17
(Greece) Manolis Siopis	2	2015–16, 2016–17
(Greece) Andreas Gianniotis	2	2016–17, 2017–18
(Brazil) Léo Matos	2	2016–17, 2017–18
(Cape Verde) Fernando Varela	2	2017–18, 2018–19
(Portugal) Vieirinha	2	2017–18, 2018–19
(Croatia) Marko Livaja	2	2017–18, 2019–20
(Greece) Spyros Risvanis	2	2018–19, 2019–20
(Portugal) Rúben Semedo	2	2019–20, 2020–21
(Morocco) Youssef El-Arabi	2	2019–20, 2020–21
(France) Yann M'Vila	2	2020–21, 2021–22
(Trinidad and Tobago) Levi García	2	2020–21, 2022–23
(Brazil) Rodinei	2	2022–23, 2023–24
(Greece) Konstantinos Koulierakis	2	2022–23, 2023–24
(Greece) Fotis Ioannidis	2	2022–23, 2023–24
(Spain) Loren Morón	2	2023–24, 2024–25
(Portugal) Gelson Martins	2	2024–25, 2025–26
74 players	1	

By club

Club	Players
Olympiacos	45
Panathinaikos	23
AEK Athens	23
PAOK	22
Atromitos	12
Panionios	6
PAS Giannina	5
Asteras Tripolis	3
Volos	3
Aris	3
Panetolikos	2
Levadiakos	2
Xanthi	1
A.E. Kifisia	1

By country

Country	Players
Greece	59
Portugal	13
Brazil	10
Argentina	8
Spain	8
France	6
Morocco	6
Croatia	5
Sweden	4
Norway	3
Iran	3
Cape Verde	3
Serbia	3
Mexico	3
Trinidad and Tobago	2
Costa Rica	1
Ukraine	1
Egypt	1
Iceland	1
Slovenia	1
Russia	1
Netherlands	1
Italy	1
Cameroon	1
Democratic Republic of the Congo	1
Ghana	1
Albania	1
Romania	1

== Super League 2 Awards ==
=== Best Player of the Season Award ===
Season	Winner(s)	Club(s)	Source
1991–92	(Greece) Dimitris Markos	Naoussa	
1992–93	(Greece) Nikos Kyzeridis	Naoussa	
1993–94	(Greece) Andreas Niniadis	Pontioi Veria	
1994–95	(Greece) Stelios Giannakopoulos	Paniliakos	
1995–96	(Syria) Mohammad Afash	Proodeftiki	
1996–97	(Greece) Giannis Martineos	Levadiakos	
1997–98	(Bosnia and Herzegovina) Simo Krunić	AEL	
1998–99	(Greece) Giannis Chatzinikolaou	Agios Nikolaos	
1999–2000	(Greece) Giorgos Sourlis	Egaleo	
2000–01	(Greece) Christoforos Andriadakis	Agios Nikolaos	
2001–02	(Greece) Giannis Angelopoulos	Proodeftiki	
2002–03	(Greece) Giorgos Zacharopoulos	Atromitos	
2003–04	(Greece) Charilaos Pappas	Apollon Kalamarias	
2004–05	(Greece) Thanasis Sentementes	Kalamata	
2005–06	(Nigeria) Patrick Ogunsoto	Ergotelis	
2006–07	(Greece) Ilias Solakis	Kastoria	
2007–08	(Greece) Ilias Anastasakos	Thrasyvoulos	
2008–09	(Greece) Nikos Soultanidis	Kavala	
2009–10	(Greece) Giorgos Theodoridis	Panetolikos	
2010–11	(Greece) Giorgos Theodoridis (2)	Panetolikos	
2011–12	(South Africa) Calvin Kadi	Veria	
2012–13	(Argentina) Diego Romano	Ergotelis	
2013–14	(Greece) Nikos Pourtoulidis (North Group) (Greece) Kostas Neofytos (South Group)	Iraklis; Acharnaikos	
2014–15	(Greece) Nikos Pourtoulidis (2) (North Group) (Greece) Christos Aravidis (South Group)	Iraklis; AEK Athens	
2015–16	(Greece) Nikos Kouskounas	Trikala	
2016–17	(Greece) Andreas Vasilogiannis	Lamia	
2017–18	(Greece) Dimitrios Manos	OFI	
2018–19	(Greece) Vasilios Mantzis	Volos	
2019–20	Not awarded since the league was not completed due to the COVID-19 pandemic.		
2020–21	(Greece) Vangelis Platellas	AEL	
2021–22	(Greece) Giannis Pasas (North Group) (Greece) Giannis Loukinas (South Group)	Veria; Kalamata	
2022–23	(Greece) Marios Ogkmpoe (North Group) (Greece) Panagiotis Kynigopoulos (South Group)	AEL; Athens Kallithea	
2023–24	(Greece) Konstantinos Papageorgiou (North Group) (Greece) Georgios Manalis (South Group)	AEL; Chania	
2024–25	(Greece) Giannis Pasas (2) (North Group) (Greece) Georgios Manalis (2) (South Group)	AEL; A.E. Kifisia	
2025–26	(Greece) Rafail Pettas (North Group) (Greece) Ilias Tselios (South Group)	Niki Volos; Kalamata	

==== By club ====
Club	Players	Wins	Seasons
AEL	5	5	1997–98, 2020–21, 2022–23, 2023–24, 2024–25
Kalamata	3	3	2004–05, 2021–22, 2025–26
Naoussa	2	2	19912–92, 1992–93
Proodeftiki	2	2	1995–96, 2001–02
Agios Nikolaos	2	2	1998–99, 2000–01
Ergotelis	2	2	2005–06, 2012–13
Panetolikos	1	2	2009–10, 2010–11
Veria	2	2	2011–12, 2021–22
Iraklis	1	2	2013–14, 2014–15
Pontioi Veria	1	1	1993–94
Paniliakos	1	1	1994–95
Levadiakos	1	1	1996–97
Egaleo	1	1	1999–2000
Atromitos	1	1	2002–03
Apollon Kalamarias	1	1	2003–04
Kastoria	1	1	2006–07
Thrasyvoulos	1	1	2007–08
Kavala	1	1	2008–09
Acharnaikos	1	1	2013–14
Trikala	1	1	2015–16
Lamia	1	1	2016–17
OFI	1	1	2017–18
Volos	1	1	2018–19
Athens Kallithea	1	1	2022–23
Chania	1	1	2023–24
A.E. Kifisia	1	1	2024–25
Niki Volos	1	1	2025–26

=== Best Foreign Player of the Season Award ===
Season	Winner(s)	Club(s)	Source
2013–14	(Spain) Añete (North Group) (Albania) Mario Gurma (South Group)	Niki Volos; Olympiacos Volos	
2014–15	(Argentina) Diego Romano (North Group) (Sweden) Jakob Johansson (South Group)	Iraklis; AEK Athens	
2015–16	(Ivory Coast) Emmanuel Koné	Apollon Smyrnis	
2016–17	(Ivory Coast) Emmanuel Koné (2)	Apollon Smyrnis	
2017–18	(Belgium) Hugo Cuypers	Ergotelis	
2018–19	(Brazil) Miguel Bianconi	Platanias	
2019–20	Not awarded since the league was not completed due to the COVID-19 pandemic.		
2020–21	(Argentina) Matías Castro	Ionikos	
2021–22	(Morocco) Hicham Kanis (North Group) (Spain) Nili (South Group)	Panserraikos; Levadiakos	
2022–23	(Belgium) Denzel Jubitana (North Group) (France) Madih Talal (South Group)	Iraklis; A.E. Kifisia	
2023–24	(Argentina) Fabricio Pedrozo / (Albania) Alberto Simoni (North Group) (Colombia) Juan Camilo Salazar (South Group)	AEL / Makedonikos; Ionikos	
2024–25	(Equatorial Guinea) Josete Miranda (North Group) (Spain) Jorge Pombo (South Group)	Iraklis; A.E. Kifisia	
2025–26	(Argentina) Rodrigo Erramuspe (North Group) (Guinea) Ahmad Mendes Moreira (South Group)	Iraklis; Kalamata	

==== By club ====
Club	Players	Wins	Seasons
Iraklis	4	4	2014–15, 2022–23, 2024–25, 2025–26
Apollon Smyrnis	1	2	2015–16, 2016–17
Ionikos	2	2	2020–21, 2023–24
A.E. Kifisia	2	2	2022–23, 2024–25
Niki Volos	1	1	2013–14
Olympiacos Volos	1	1	2013–14
AEK Athens	1	1	2014–15
Ergotelis	1	1	2017–18
Platanias	1	1	2018–19
Panserraikos	1	1	2021–22
Levadiakos	1	1	2021–22
AEL	1	1	2023–24
Makedonikos	1	1	2023–24
Kalamata	1	1	2025–26

==== By country ====
Country	Players	Wins	Seasons
Argentina	4	4	2014–15, 2020–21, 2023–24, 2025–26
Spain	3	3	2013–14, 2021–22, 2024–25
Ivory Coast	1	2	2015–16, 2016–17
Belgium	2	2	2017–18, 2022–23
Brazil	1	1	2018–19
Sweden	1	1	2014–15
Morocco	1	1	2021–22
France	1	1	2022–23
Albania	1	1	2023–24
Colombia	1	1	2023–24
Equatorial Guinea	1	1	2024–25
Guinea	1	1	2025–26

=== Best Young Player of the Season Award ===
Season	Winner(s)	Club(s)	Source
2009–10	(Greece) Georgios Georgiadis	Panserraikos	
2010–11	(Greece) Nikos Kaltsas	Veria	
2011–12	(Greece) Athanasios Dinas	Panachaiki	
2012–13	(Greece) Andreas Bouchalakis	Ergotelis	
2013–14	(Greece) Kosmas Tsilianidis (North Group) (Greece) Kostas Plegas (South Group)	Iraklis; Panachaiki	
2014–15	(Greece) Kosmas Tsilianidis (2) (North Group) (Greece) Adam Tzanetopoulos (South Group)	Iraklis; AEK Athens	
2015–16	(Greece) Giannis Masouras	AEL	
2016–17	(Greece) Triantafyllos Pasalidis	Aiginiakos	
2017–18	(Greece) Georgios Xydas	AO Chania−Kissamikos	
2018–19	(Greece) Giannis Iatroudis	Ergotelis	
2019–20	Not awarded since the league was not completed due to the COVID-19 pandemic.		
2020–21	(Greece) Konstantinos Thymianis	Xanthi	
2021–22	(Greece) Georgios Koutsias (North Group) (Greece) Andrews Tetteh (South Group)	PAOK B A.E. Kifisia	
2022–23	(Greece) Marios Sofianos (North Group) (Guinea) Algassime Bah (South Group)	Panserraikos; Olympiacos B	
2023–24	(Greece) Argyris Darelas (North Group) (Greece) Charalampos Kostoulas (South Group)	PAOK B Olympiacos B	
2024–25	(Greece) Giannis Gitersos / (Greece) Athanasios Prodromitis / (Greece) Lampros Smyrlis (North Group) (Greece) Georgios Kyriopoulos (South Group)	PAOK B / Niki Volos / PAOK B A.E. Kifisia	
2025–26	(Greece) Christos Almyras (North Group) (Greece) Chrysanthos Gezos (South Group)	Asteras Tripolis B Hellas Syros	

==== By club ====
Club	Players	Wins	Seasons
PAOK B	4	4	2021–22, 2023–24, 2024–25 (twice)
Panachaiki	2	2	2011–12, 2013–14
Ergotelis	1	2	2012–13, 2018–19
Iraklis	1	2	2013–14, 2014–15
Panserraikos	2	2	2009–10, 2022–23
Olympiacos B	2	2	2022–23, 2023–24
A.E. Kifisia	2	2	2021–22, 2024–25
Veria	1	1	2010–11
AEK Athens	1	1	2014–15
AEL	1	1	2015–16
Aiginiakos	1	1	2016–17
Chania	1	1	2017–18
Xanthi	1	1	2020–21
Niki Volos	1	1	2024–25
Asteras Tripolis B	1	1	2025–26
Hellas Syros	1	1	2025–26

=== Best Goalkeeper of the Season Award ===
Season	Winner(s)	Club(s)	Source
2008–09	(Greece) Fanis Katergiannakis	Kavala	
2009–10	(Greece) Asterios Giakoumis	Agrotikos Asteras	
2010–11	(Italy) Luigi Cennamo	Panetolikos	
2011–12	(Greece) Dimitrios Koutsopoulos	Panthrakikos	
2012–13	(Greece) Ilias Vouras	Niki Volos	
2013–14	(Greece) Manolis Apostolidis (North Group) (Greece) Christos Athanasopoulos (South Group)	Niki Volos; Iraklis Psachna	
2014–15	(Greece) Manolis Apostolidis (North Group) (Greece) Vaggelis Pitkas (South Group)	AEL; Apollon Smyrnis	
2015–16	(Greece) Gennadios Xenodochof	AEL	
2016–17	(Greece) Sokratis Dioudis	Aris	
2017–18	(Greece) Georgios Strezos	OFI	
2018–19	(Albania) Orestis Menka	Doxa Drama	
2019–20	Not awarded since the league was not completed due to the COVID-19 pandemic.		
2020–21	(Greece) Dimitrios Katsimitros	Ergotelis	
2021–22	(Greece) Konstantinos Theodoropoulos (North Group) (Greece) Georgios Strezos (South Group)	AEL; Athens Kallithea	
2022–23	(Greece) Panagiotis Katsikas (North Group) (Greece) Dimitrios Tairis (South Group)	Panserraikos; Kalamata	
2023–24	(Greece) Kleton Perntreou (North Group) (Greece) Ioannis Gelios (South Group)	Makedonikos; Ionikos	
2024–25	(Greece) Stefanos Souloukos (North Group) (Greece) Vasilios Xenopoulos (South Group)	AEL; A.E. Kifisia	
2025–26	(Greece) Athanasios Garavelis (North Group) (Greece) Ioannis Gelios (2) (South Group)	Niki Volos; Kalamata	

==== By club ====
Club	Players	Wins	Seasons
AEL	4	4	2014–15, 2015–16, 2021–22, 2024–25
Niki Volos	3	3	2012–13, 2013–14, 2025–26
Kalamata	2	2	2022–23, 2025–26
Kavala	1	1	2008–09
Agrotikos Asteras	1	1	2009–10
Panetolikos	1	1	2010–11
Panthrakikos	1	1	2011–12
Iraklis Psachna	1	1	2013–14
Apollon Smyrnis	1	1	2014–15
Aris	1	1	2016–17
OFI	1	1	2017–18
Doxa Drama	1	1	2018–19
Ergotelis	1	1	2020–21
Athens Kallithea	1	1	2021–22
Panserraikos	1	1	2022–23
Makedonikos	1	1	2023–24
Ionikos	1	1	2023–24
A.E. Kifisia	1	1	2024–25

=== Manager Awards ===
Season	Winner(s)	Club(s)	Source
2013–14	(Greece) Michalis Grigoriou (North Group) (Belgium) Jacky Mathijssen (South Group)	Kerkyra; Fostiras	
2014–15	(Greece) Nikos Papadopoulos (North Group) (Greece) Traianos Dellas (South Group)	Iraklis; AEK Athens	
2015–16	(Greece) Alekos Vosniadis	Apollon Smyrnis / Kerkyra	
2016–17	(Greece) Akis Mantzios	Apollon Smyrnis	
2017–18	(Greece) Nikos Papadopoulos (2)	OFI	
2018–19	(Spain) Juan Ferrando	Volos	
2019–20	Not awarded since the league was not completed due to the COVID-19 pandemic.		
2020–21	(Greece) Dimitrios Spanos	Ionikos	
2021–22	(Greece) Pavlos Dermitzakis (North Group) (Greece) Giannis Taousianis (South Group)	Veria; Levadiakos	
2022–23	(Greece) Pavlos Dermitzakis (2) (North Group) (Greece) Giorgos Petrakis (South Group)	Panserraikos; A.E. Kifisia	
2023–24	(Greece) Stelios Malezas (North Group) (Greece) Giannis Tatsis (South Group)	Makedonikos; Panachaiki	
2024–25	(Greece) Alekos Vosniadis (2) (North Group) (Argentina) Sebastian Leto (South Group)	AEL; A.E. Kifisia	
2025–26	(Greece) Georgios Antonopoulos (North Group) (Greece) Alekos Vosniadis (3) (South Group)	Asteras Tripolis B Kalamata	

==== By club ====
Club	Players	Wins	Seasons
Kerkyra	2	2	2013–14, 2015–16
Apollon Smyrnis	2	2	2015–16, 2016–17
A.E. Kifisia	2	2	2022–23, 2024–25
Fostiras	1	1	2013–14
Iraklis	1	1	2014–15
AEK Athens	1	1	2014–15
OFI	1	1	2017–18
Volos	1	1	2018–19
Ionikos	1	1	2020–21
Veria	1	1	2021–22
Levadiakos	1	1	2021–22
Panserraikos	1	1	2022–23
Makedonikos	1	1	2023–24
Panachaiki	1	1	2023–24
AEL	1	1	2024–25
Asteras Tripolis B	1	1	2025–26
Kalamata	1	1	2025–26

== Gamma Ethniki Awards ==
=== Best Player of the Season Award ===
Season	North Zone		South Zone		Source
Season	Winner(s)	Club(s)	Winner(s)	Club(s)	Source
1991–92	(Greece) Dimitris Kritikos	Panelefsiniakos	(Greece) Giannis Thomaidis	Eordaikos	
1992–93	(Greece) Thomas Troupkos	Veria	(Greece) Paris Valvis	Egaleo	
1993–94	(Greece) Giannis Karatziotis	Keravnos Kolchiko	(Greece) Dimitris Moustakas	Doxa Vyronas	
1994–95	(Greece) Paraskevas Antzas (Greece) Stratos Mantzanas	Pandramaikos; Niki Volos	(Greece) Stelios Vogiatzis	Panelefsiniakos	
1995–96	(Greece) Charis Kariofyllis		(Greece) Sokratis Ofrydopoulos	Proodeftiki	
1996–97	(Greece) Nikos Papanikolaou	Olympiacos Volos	(Greece) Anthonis Kefaloukos	Irodotos	
1997–98	(Greece) Apostolos Dartzalis	AE Ampelokipoi Thessaloniki	(Albania) Elton Koça	A.O. Agios Nikolaos	
1998–99	(Greece) Merkouris Karaliopoulos	Naoussa	(Greece) Anthonis Kefaloukos (2)	Marko	
1999–2000	(Greece) Giorgos Sourlis	Egaleo	(Greece) Giannis Katemis	Chalkidona	
2000–01			(Greece) Stavros Lioftis	Apollon Krya Vrysi	
2001–02			(Greece) Dimitris Salpingidis	Kavala	
2002–03			(Greece) Sotirios Tsatsos	Agrotikos Asteras	
2003–04			(Greece) Sokratis Kopsachilis	Thrasyvoulos	
2004–05	(Greece) Petros Zouroudis	Panetolikos	(Greece) Nikos Pourtoulidis	Thrasyvoulos	
2005–06	(Greece) Panagiotis Bekiaris	Agrotikos Asteras	(Greece) Michalis Klokidis	Asteras Tripolis	
2006–07	(Greece) Alexandros Vergonis	Olympiacos Volos	(Greece) Andreas Lampropoulos	Thyella Patras	
2007–08	(Greece) Christos Chatzipantelidis	Niki Volos	(Greece) Christos Chatzipantelidis	Niki Volos	
2008–09	(Greece) Panagiotis Zorbas	Panetolikos	(Greece) Georgios Trichias (Greece) Giorgos Zacharopoulos	Rodos; Fostiras	
2009–10	(Costa Rica) Enoc Pérez	Trikala	(Greece) Leonidas Kyvelidis	Panachaiki	
2010–11	(Greece) Stelios Liveris	Zakynthos	(Greece) Nikolaos Katsikokeris	Platanias	
2011–12	(Greece) Antonis Macheroudis	Ethnikos Gazoros	(Greece) Vasilis Plousis	Chania	
2012–13	(Greece) Sokratis Bountouris	Anagennisi Karditsa	(Greece) Spyros Dorovinis	Fostiras	

=== Best Young Player of the Season Award ===
Season	North Zone		South Zone		Source
Season	Winner	Club	Winner	Club	Source
2009–10	(Greece) Nikos Kaltsas	Veria	(Greece) Vangelis Platellas	Kallithea	
2010–11	(Greece) Vasilis Triantafyllakos	Odysseas Anagennisi	(Greece) Thanasis Dinas	Panachaiki	
2011–12	(Greece) Andreas Gianniotis	Ethnikos Gazoros	(Greece) Myron Anoyianakis	Chania	
2012–13	(Greece) Kostas Achalinopoulos	Odysseas Kordelio	(Greece) Stavros Petavrakis	Fostiras	

=== Best Goalkeeper of the Season Award ===
Season	North Zone		South Zone		Source
Season	Winner	Club	Winner	Club	Source
2009–10	(Greece) Giannis Paraskevas	Eordaikos	(Poland) Kamil Ulman	Vyzas Megara	
2010–11	(Greece) Christos Kelpekis	Anagennisi Giannitsa	(Greece) Ioannis Liourdis	Platanias	
2011–12	(Greece) Andreas Gianniotis	Ethnikos Gazoros	(Greece) Sokratis Kopsachilis	Kalamata	
2012–13	(Greece) Dimitris Karatziovalis	Apollon Kalamarias	(Greece) Michalis Pagoudis	Acharnaikos	

== Greek A Division ==
=== Best Greek Player of the Season Award ===
Season	Winner(s)	Club(s)	Source
2022–23	Vasia Giannaka	PAOK	
2023–24	Maria Mitkou	PAOK	
2024–25	Despoina Chatzinikolaou	AEK Athens	
2025–26	Grigoria Pouliou	Panathinaikos	

=== Best Foreign Player of the Season Award ===
Season	Winner(s)	Club(s)	Source
2021–22 (Note: MVP of the Season)	(Pakistan) Aqsa Mushtaq	Avantes Chalkidas	
2022–23	(Slovakia) Nikola Rybanská	OFI	
2023–24	(Slovakia) Nikola Rybanská (2)	OFI	
2024–25	(Slovakia) Nikola Rybanská (3)	OFI	
2025–26	(Bosnia and Herzegovina) Minela Gačanica	PAOK	

=== Best Young Player of the Season Award ===
Season	Winner(s)	Club(s)	Source
2022–23	(Greece) Georgia Chalatsogianni	PAOK	
2023–24	(Greece) Georgia Chalatsogianni (2)	PAOK	
2024–25	(Greece) Matina Ntarzanou	Panathinaikos	
2025–26	(Greece) Panagiota Argyriou	PAOK	

=== Best Goalkeeper of the Season Award ===
Season	Winner(s)	Club(s)	Source
2021–22	(Greece) Dimitra Giannakouli	Avantes Chalkidas	
2022–23	(Greece) Zoi Nasi	Trikala	
2023–24	(Brazil) Dani Neuhaus	PAOK	
2024–25	(Greece) Dimitra Giannakouli (2)	AEK Athens	
2025–26	(Brazil) Dani Neuhaus (2)	PAOK	

=== Best Manager of the Season Award ===
Season	Winner(s)	Club(s)	Source
2022–23	(Greece) Lefteris Kanatas	PAOK	
2023–24	(Greece) Thalis Theodoridis	PAOK	
2024–25	(Greece) Nikos Kotsovos	AEK Athens	
2025–26	(Greece) Thanasis Patrikidis	PAOK	

=== Team of the Season ===
==== 2023–24 ====
Pos.	Player	Club(s)
GK	(Brazil) Dani Neuhaus	PAOK
DF	(Greece) Maria Paterna	OFI
DF	(Greece) Anastasia Gkatsou	REA
DF	(Greece) Maria Gkouni	PAOK
DF	(Greece) Maria Mitkou	PAOK
MF	(Greece) Georgia Chalatsogianni	PAOK
MF	(Greece) Vasia Giannaka	PAOK
MF	(Slovenia) Manja Rogan	Panathinaikos
FW	(Haiti) Chelsea Domond	Panathinaikos
FW	(Slovakia) Nikola Rybanská	OFI
FW	(Sweden) Emelie Helmvall	PAOK

==== 2024–25 ====
Pos.	Player	Club(s)
GK	(Greece) Dimitra Giannakouli	AEK Athens
DF	(Greece) Matina Ntarzanou	Panathinaikos
DF	(Greece) Georgia Pavlopoulou	AEK Athens
DF	(Greece) Maria Gkouni	PAOK
DF	(Greece) Maria Mitkou	PAOK
MF	(Greece) Eleni Saich	Asteras Tripolis
MF	(Japan) Suzuka Yosue	REA
MF	(Cyprus) Eirini Michail	Asteras Tripolis
MF	(Cyprus) Antri Violari	AEK Athens
FW	(Slovakia) Nikola Rybanská	OFI
FW	(Greece) Despoina Chatzinikolaou	PAOK

==== 2025–26 ====
Pos.	Player	Club(s)
GK	(Brazil) Dani Neuhaus	PAOK
DF	(Greece) Maria Paterna	OFI
DF	(Greece) Maria Gkouni	PAOK
DF	(Greece) Anastasia Gkatsou	Asteras Tripolis
DF	(Greece) Maria Mitkou	PAOK
MF	(North Macedonia) Lenche Andreevska	PAOK
MF	(Greece) Eleni Saich	AEK Athens
MF	(Spain) Marta Llopis	PAOK
MF	(Greece) Panagiota Argyriou	PAOK
FW	(Bosnia and Herzegovina) Minela Gačanica	PAOK
FW	(Greece) Grigoria Pouliou	Panathinaikos

== Referee of the Season Award ==
Season	Winner	Association	Source
1988–89	Kostas Dimitriadis	Piraeus	
1991–92	Theodoros Kefalas	Athens	
1992–93	Vassilios Nikakis	Aetoloacarnania	
1993–94	Vassilios Nikakis (2)	Aetoloacarnania	
1994–95	Alexandros Naziris	Thessaloniki	
1995–96	Giorgos Bikas	Chalkidiki	
1996–97	Giorgos Bikas (2)	Chalkidiki	
1997–98	Malamas Tevekelis	Thessaloniki	
1998–99	Giorgos Douros	Corinthia	
1999–2000	George Psychomanis	Athens	
2000–01	Kyros Vassaras	Thessaloniki	
2001–02	Kyros Vassaras (2)	Thessaloniki	
2002–03	Giorgos Douros (2)	Corinthia	
2003–04	Kyros Vassaras (3)	Thessaloniki	
2004–05	Kyros Vassaras (4)	Thessaloniki	
2005–06	Kyros Vassaras (5)	Thessaloniki	
2006–07	Kyros Vassaras (6)	Thessaloniki	
2007–08	Giorgos Kasnaferis	Athens	
2008–09	Anastasios Kakos	Corfu	
2009–10	Anastasios Kakos (2)	Corfu	
2010–11	Anastasios Kakos (3)	Corfu	
2011–12	Anastasios Kakos (4)	Corfu	
2012–13	Anastasios Kakos (5)	Corfu	
2013–14	Anastasios Kakos (6)	Corfu	
2014–15	Anastasios Sidiropoulos	Dodecanese	
2015–16	Anastasios Sidiropoulos (2)	Dodecanese	
2016–17	Anastasios Papapetrou	Athens	
2017–18	Anastasios Papapetrou (2)	Athens	
2018–19	Anastasios Papapetrou (3)	Athens	
2019–20	Anastasios Sidiropoulos (3)	Dodecanese	
2020–21	Anastasios Sidiropoulos (4)	Dodecanese	
2021–22	Anastasios Sidiropoulos (5)	Dodecanese	
2022–23	Evangelos Manouchos	Argolida	
2023–24	Anastasios Sidiropoulos (6)	Dodecanese	
2024–25	Anastasios Papapetrou (4)	Athens	
2025–26	Angelos Evangelou	Athens	

== Fair Play Prize Award ==
Season	Winner(s)	Club(s)	Source
2000–01	(Greece) Angelos Anastasiadis	Panathinaikos	
2001–02	(Greece) Stelios Giannakopoulos (Greece) Michalis Kasapis	Olympiacos; AEK Athens	
2002–03	(Greece) Nikos Nioplias	Chalkidona	
2003–04	Levadiakos		
2004–05	Ergotelis		
2005–06	Chaidari		
2006–07	–		
2007–08	–		
2008–09	–		
2009–10	–		
2010–11	–		
2011–12	–		
2012–13	–		
2013–14	(Greece) Giannis Chloros	Nea Ionia	
2014–15	(Greece) Christos Tasoulis	Panionios	
2015–16	AO Chania		
2016–17	AEK Athens / PAOK		
2017–18	(Greece) Thomas Nazlidis	AEL	
2018–19	Panathinaikos U15		
2019–20	(Greece) Nikos Gavalas (Greece) Andreas Dimatos (Greece) Stamatis Garris (Greece) Savvas Aroniadis (Greece) Pantelis Zoumpoulis	Olympiacos; AEK Athens Panathinaikos; PAOK; Aris	
2020–21	Ergotelis (Women)		
2021–22	(Argentina) Sergio Araujo	AEK Athens	
2022–23	Olympiacos U15 / PAOK U15 / AEK Athens U15 / Aris U15		
2023–24	–		
2024–25	–		
2025–26	–		

== Best Greek Player playing Abroad Award ==
=== Men ===
Season	Player(s)	Club(s)	Source(s)
2016–17	Sokratis Papastathopoulos	(Germany) Borussia Dortmund	
2017–18	Kostas Manolas	(Italy) Roma	
2018–19	Sokratis Papastathopoulos (2)	(England) Arsenal	
2019–20	Anastasios Bakasetas; Taxiarchis Fountas	(Turkey) Alanyaspor (Austria) Rapid Wien	
2020–21	Giorgos Giakoumakis	(Netherlands) VVV-Venlo	
2021–22	Anastasios Bakasetas (2)	(Turkey) Trabzonspor	
2022–23	Anastasios Douvikas	(Netherlands) Utrecht	
2023–24	Vangelis Pavlidis	(Netherlands) AZ Alkmaar	
2024–25	Vangelis Pavlidis (2)	(Portugal) Benfica	
2025–26	Christos Tzolis	(Belgium) Club Brugge	

=== Women ===
Season	Player(s)	Club(s)	Source(s)
2021–22	Veatriki Sarri	(England) Birmingham City	
2022–23	Veatriki Sarri (2)	(England) Brighton & Hove Albion	
2023–24	Veatriki Sarri (3)	(England) Brighton & Hove Albion	
2024–25	Veatriki Sarri (4)	(England) Everton	
2025–26	Veatriki Sarri (5)	(England) Birmingham City	

== See also ==
- Super League Greece
- Football records and statistics in Greece
