= Themis Kefalas =

Greek footballer (born 2000)

Personal information
- Full name: Themistoklis Kefalas
- Date of birth: 28 May 2000 (age 26)
- Place of birth: Athens, Greece
- Height: 1.91 m (6 ft 3 in)
- Position: Defender

Team information
- Current team: Episkopi
- Number: 6

Youth career
- 2016–2018: Haringey Borough

Senior career*
Years	Team	Apps	(Gls)
2018–2022	Queens Park Rangers	0	(0)
2019–2020	→ Billericay Town (loan)	15	(1)
2021	→ Barnet (loan)	22	(2)
2022	Panserraikos	15	(0)
2022–24	Episkopi	23	(1)
2024–25	Marko	20	(0)
2025–	Ionikos	0	(0)
- * Club domestic league appearances and goals as of 16 June 2023

Themis Kefalas (Greek: Θέμης Κεφαλάς; born 28 May 2000) is a Greek professional footballer who plays as a defender for Gamma Ethniki club Ionikos.

== Career ==
At the age of 16, Kefalas joined the youth academy of English eighth tier side Haringey Borough. In 2018, he signed for QPR in the English second tier. In 2019, he was sent on loan to English sixth tier club Billericay Town. Before the second half of 2020–21, Kefalas was sent on loan to Barnet in the English fifth tier.

Before the second half of 2021–22, he signed for Greek team Panserraikos after receiving interest from France and Spain. On 2 February 2022, he debuted for Panserraikos during a 0–1 loss to Anagennisi Karditsa.
