= 2012–13 Football League 2 =

2012–13 Football League 2 may refer to:

- 2012–13 Football League 2 (Greece)
- 2012–13 Football League Two, England
