= 2013–14 Football League (Greece) =

Football League
- Season: 2013–14
- Dates: 29 September 2013 – 1 June 2014
- Champions: Niki Volos
- Promoted: Niki Volos; Kerkyra
- Relegated: Doxa Drama; Vataniakos; Kavala; Anagennisi Giannitsa; Asteras Magoula; Glyfada; Vyzas
- Matches: 273 at each group
- Top goalscorer: Mario Gurma (21 goals)

The 2013–14 Football League is the second division of the Greek professional football system and the fourth season under the name Football League after previously being known as Beta Ethniki. This is the first season after 1982–83 that the league has more than one groups. The groups are created based on geographical criteria.

== North Group ==
In the north group, as well as in the south group, the bottom three teams are relegated. None of the teams will be promoted directly. The top four teams of each group will qualify to a play-off round, to determine the three teams which will be promoted to Super League.

=== Teams ===
Location of teams in North Group of 2013–14 Football League

Team	Location	Stadium	Capacity	Last season	Ref
Aiginiakos	Aiginio	Municipal Stadium of Eginio	1,000	FL2 North, 4th	
Anagennisi Giannitsa	Giannitsa	Giannitsa Municipal Stadium	8,000	18th	
Anagennisi Karditsa	Karditsa	Karditsa Stadium	9,500	FL2 North, 2nd	
Apollon Kalamaria	Kalamaria	Kalamaria Stadium	6,500	FL2 North, 1st	
Doxa Drama	Drama	Doxa Drama Stadium	7,000	10th	
Ethnikos Gazoros	Serres	Serres Municipal Stadium	9,500	14th	
Iraklis	Thessaloniki	Kaftanzoglio Stadium	27,770	5th (PO)	
Kavala	Kavala	Anthi Karagianni Stadium	10,500	12th	
Kerkyra	Corfu	Kerkyra Stadium	2,776	Super League, 16th	
Niki Volos	Volos	Panthessaliko Stadium	22,700	7th (PO)	
Pierikos	Katerini	Katerini Municipal Stadium	4,956	16th	
Tyrnavos	Tyrnavos	Tyrnavos Stadium	2,000	FL2 North, 5th	
Vataniakos^{1}	Katerini	Vatan Municipal Stadium	800	FL2 North, 6th	
Zakynthos^{1}	Zakynthos	Zakynthians Olympic Champions Ground	2,000	FL2 North, 7th	

1. Since AEK Athens, Panserraikos, AEL were relegated to Football League 2 and Kerkyra with Kassiopi were merged, the teams became 24 and Vataniakos, Zakynthos, Paniliakos and Glyfada had to get promoted in order to fill the empty spots in Football League.

=== League table ===
Pos	Team	Pld	W	D	L	GF	GA	GD	Pts	Qualification or relegation
1	Kerkyra (Q)	26	19	2	5	45	18	+27	59	Qualification to Promotion Play-offs
2	Niki Volos (Q)	26	17	5	4	47	12	+35	56	Qualification to Promotion Play-offs
3	Aiginiakos (Q)	26	14	9	3	45	15	+30	51	Qualification to Promotion Play-offs
4	Iraklis (Q)	26	15	3	8	36	19	+17	48	Qualification to Promotion Play-offs
5	Anagennisi Karditsa	26	12	8	6	28	20	+8	44	
6	Tyrnavos	26	11	8	7	27	22	+5	41	
7	Apollon Kalamarias	26	11	4	11	33	32	+1	37	
8	Ethnikos Gazoros	26	9	8	9	23	22	+1	35	
9	Zakynthos	26	10	1	15	25	35	−10	31	
10	Doxa Drama (R)	26	8	6	12	22	30	−8	30	Relegation to Gamma Ethniki
11	Pierikos	26	8	5	13	20	34	−14	29	
12	Vataniakos (R)	26	5	5	16	20	45	−25	20	Relegation to Gamma Ethniki
13	Kavala (R)	26	4	5	17	18	49	−31	17	Relegation to Gamma Ethniki
14	Anagennisi Giannitsa (R)	26	3	3	20	15	51	−36	12	Relegation to Gamma Ethniki

Source: footballleaguenews.gr
Rules for classification: 1) points, 2) head-to-head points
(Q) Qualified for the phase indicated; (R) Relegated

=== Matches ===
Home \ Away	EGN	AGN	APO	DDR	GAZ	IRT	ZAK	KAV	KER	NVL	KRD	PIE	TYR	VAT
Aiginiakos		1–0	2–0	3–0	1–1	1–0	3–0	5–0	1–0	1–1	1–1	0–0	3–3	3–0
Anagennisi Giannitsa	0–3		0–1	1–2	1–1	0–1	2–0	1–0	1–4	0–5	1–3	0–3	0–2	0–1
Apollon Kalamarias	1–1	4–1		1–1	1–3	0–1	2–1	4–0	1–2	1–3	1–2	2–0	1–1	2–0
Doxa Drama	0–0	4–0	0–1		2–0	0–2	0–1	2–1	1–3	0–2	1–0	2–1	0–0	2–1
Ethnikos Gazoros	1–0	3–0	3–1	1–0		0–2	3–0	1–1	1–2	0–1	0–0	0–0	1–0	1–0
Iraklis	2–1	2–1	2–0	1–1	2–0		2–1	1–0	1–0	1–2	3–1	6–0	0–1	3–1
Zakynthos	0–3	2–0	3–0	3–0	2–1	0–0		1–0	1–2	2–0	0–1	2–1	3–0	2–0
Kavala	1–0	2–2	0–3	0–0	1–2	3–2	1–0		0–1	0–3	1–4	2–0	1–3	0–0
Kerkyra	1–3	1–0	2–0	2–0	1–0	0–1	1–0	4–1		1–0	3–0	1–0	2–0	4–3
Niki Volos	0–1	2–1	4–0	1–0	0–0	2–0	5–0	3–0	1–1		1–0	1–0	2–0	4–0
Anagennisi Karditsa	1–1	1–1	1–1	0–0	2–0	2–1	2–0	1–0	1–0	0–0		1–0	0–0	1–0
Pierikos	1–5	0–1	0–1	2–1	1–1	0–0	2–0	1–0	0–2	2–1	0–2		1–1	1–0
Tyrnavos	1–2	1–0	0–2	1–0	1–0	1–0	2–0	4–2	0–0	0–0	1–0	1–2		3–0
Vataniakos	0–0	2–1	0–2	2–3	0–0	1–0	2–1	1–1	1–5	1–3	3–1	1–2	0–0	

Legend: Blue = home team win; Yellow = draw; Red = away team win.

== South Group ==
The same rules to the North Group apply.

=== Teams ===
Location of teams in South Group of 2013–14 Football League

Team	Location	Stadium	Capacity	Last season	Ref
Acharnaikos	Menidi	Acharnes Stadium	4,450	FL2 South, 3rd	
Asteras Magoula	Magoula	Municipal Stadium of Elefsina	1,400	FL2 South, 5th	
Chania	Chania	Perivolia Municipal Stadium	2,800	FL2 South, 6th	
Episkopi	Rethimno	Episkopi Stadium	1,000	FL2 South, 4th	
Fokikos	Amfissa	Amfissa Municipal Stadium	2,000	17th	
Fostiras	Tavros	Tavros Stadium	4,000	FL2 South, 1st	
Glyfada^{1}	Glyfada	Elliniko Stadium	10,800	FL2 South, 9th	
Iraklis Psachna	Psachna	Psachna Municipal Stadium	5,500	11th	
Kallithea	Kallithea	Grigoris Lambrakis Stadium	4,250	13th	
Olympiacos Volos 1937	Volos	Volos Municipal Stadium	9,000	6th (PO)	
Panachaiki	Patras	Kostas Davourlis Stadium	11,321	15th	
Panegialios	Aigio	Aigio Stadium	4,500	FL2 South, 2nd	
Paniliakos^{1}	Pyrgos	Pirgos Municipal Stadium	6,750	FL2 South, 8th	
Vyzas	Megara	Megara Municipal Stadium	2,350	19th	

1. Since AEK Athens, Panserraikos, AEL were relegated to Football League 2 and Kerkyra with Kassiopi were merged, the teams became 24 and Vataniakos, Zakynthos, Paniliakos and Glyfada had to get promoted in order to fill the empty spots in Football League.

=== League table ===
Pos	Team	Pld	W	D	L	GF	GA	GD	Pts	Qualification or relegation
1	Olympiacos Volos (Q)	26	17	5	4	54	18	+36	56	Qualification to Promotion Play-offs
2	Chania (Q)	26	13	9	4	29	13	+16	48	Qualification to Promotion Play-offs
3	Fostiras (Q)	26	13	7	6	27	19	+8	46	Qualification to Promotion Play-offs
4	Iraklis Psachna (Q)	26	12	8	6	32	14	+18	44	Qualification to Promotion Play-offs
5	Panegialios	26	12	8	6	27	19	+8	44	
6	Panachaiki	26	11	7	8	28	21	+7	40	
7	Kallithea	26	9	12	5	32	21	+11	39	
8	Acharnaikos	26	10	7	9	26	22	+4	37	
9	Fokikos	26	11	3	12	33	31	+2	36	
10	Paniliakos	26	10	5	11	30	28	+2	35	
11	Episkopi	26	10	4	12	30	28	+2	34	
12	Asteras Magoula (R)	26	7	6	13	26	36	−10	27	Relegation to Gamma Ethniki
13	Glyfada (R)	26	2	3	21	16	62	−46	9	Relegation to Gamma Ethniki
14	Vyzas (R)	26	2	2	22	17	75	−58	8	Relegation to Gamma Ethniki

Source: footballleaguenews.gr
Rules for classification: 1) points, 2) head-to-head points
(Q) Qualified for the phase indicated; (R) Relegated

=== Matches ===
Home \ Away	ACH	PNL	MGL	CHA	EPI	FOK	FOS	IPS	KLT	GLY	OVL	PCK	PEG	VYZ
Acharnaikos		3–1	1–0	1–1	0–1	1–0	0–1	1–3	0–2	2–1	0–0	2–0	0–1	3–0
Paniliakos	2–1		1–0	1–1	1–2	3–1	0–2	1–0	1–0	1–0	1–0	1–0	1–1	1–1
Asteras Magoula	0–0	0–2		0–1	3–2	3–2	0–1	1–1	1–1	1–1	0–3	0–2	1–2	3–2
Chania	2–1	1–1	1–0		1–0	1–0	0–1	0–0	2–0	2–0	2–1	0–0	1–1	5–1
Episkopi	0–0	1–0	0–3	0–0		0–1	3–0	2–2	0–1	5–1	0–2	1–2	2–0	2–0
Fokikos	0–2	2–1	0–2	1–0	2–1		1–0	1–0	2–2	2–1	2–2	2–1	0–1	4–0
Fostiras	1–1	2–1	3–0	0–2	3–0	1–0		1–0	0–0	1–1	1–0	0–0	0–0	2–0
Iraklis Psachna	0–0	0–0	4–0	2–1	2–0	1–0	2–1		1–1	4–0	0–0	0–1	1–0	4–0
Kallithea	0–1	2–0	2–2	0–0	1–0	2–1	1–1	0–0		5–0	0–2	0–0	1–3	2–1
Glyfada	0–1	0–7	0–3	0–1	0–2	0–2	0–0	1–2	1–4		0–4	0–1	0–2	3–1
Olympiacos Volos 1937	3–1	2–1	3–2	2–1	2–1	1–0	5–1	2–0	1–1	4–1		1–1	0–1	4–1
Panachaiki	3–1	2–1	1–1	0–0	0–1	3–0	0–1	0–1	0–0	2–1	0–1		2–0	3–0
Panegialios	0–0	1–0	1–0	0–1	1–1	1–1	1–0	0–3	1–1	2–1	0–1	4–0		2–0
Vyzas	0–3	3–0	0–1	0–2	0–3	1–6	1–3	1–0	0–3	1–3	0–8	2–4	1–1	

Legend: Blue = home team win; Yellow = draw; Red = away team win.

== Promotion Play-offs ==
Pos	Team	Pld	W	D	L	GF	GA	GD	Pts	Promotion or qualification
1	Niki Volos (C, P)	14	8	3	3	18	9	+9	29	Promotion to Super League
2	Kerkyra (P)	14	6	4	4	13	10	+3	28	Promotion to Super League
3	Olympiacos Volos (Q)	14	4	7	3	10	5	+5	25	Qualification to the Promotion Play-Off Match
4	Chania	14	6	3	5	14	9	+5	22	
5	Iraklis Psachna	14	4	7	3	13	11	+2	19	
6	Aiginiakos	14	4	4	6	12	18	−6	16	
7	Iraklis Thessaloniki	14	3	6	5	9	16	−7	15	
8	Fostiras	14	2	4	8	6	18	−12	10	

Source: Football League
Rules for classification: 1) points; 2) goal difference; 3) number of goals scored.
(C) Champions; (P) Promoted; (Q) Qualified for the phase indicated

=== Matches ===
Home \ Away	EGN	CHA	FOS	KER	NVL	OVL	IPS	IRT
Aiginiakos		0–2	1–0	1–0	0–1	0–0	1–1	2–2
Chania	2–0		1–0	2–0	0–1	0–0	0–1	3–0
Fostiras	1–4	2–1		0–1	1–1	1–0	0–0	0–1
Kerkyra	2–0	2–0	0–0		2–1	1–2	2–1	1–0
Niki Volos	2–3	2–1	2–0	1–0		0–0	0–0	4–0
Olympiacos Volos 1937	2–0	0–0	4–0	0–0	0–1		0–0	1–1
Iraklis Psachna	2–0	1–2	1–1	1–1	1–2	1–0		2–1
Iraklis	0–0	0–0	1–0	1–1	1–0	0–1	1–1	

Legend: Blue = home team win; Yellow = draw; Red = away team win.

== Season statistics ==
=== Top scorers ===
Rank	Player	Club	Goals
1	(Albania) Mario Gurma	Olympiacos Volos	21
2	(Spain) Añete	Niki Volos	20
3	(Greece) Christos Tzioras	Niki Volos	18
4	(North Macedonia) Zoran Baldovaliev	Olympiacos Volos	14
6	(Greece) Michalis Fragos	Fokikos	13
6	(Greece) Konstantinos Neofytos	Acharnaikos	13
7	(Greece) Stelios Kritikos	Iraklis Psachna	11
9	(Greece) Dimitrios Diamantopoulos	Doxa Drama	10
9	(Cameroon) Olivier Boumal	Iraklis Psachna	10
