= Manolis Kalogerakis =

Greek footballer

Personal information
- Full name: Emmanouil Kalogerakis
- Date of birth: 12 March 1992 (age 34)
- Place of birth: Chania, Crete, Greece
- Height: 1.85 m (6 ft 1 in)
- Position: Goalkeeper

Team information
- Current team: Kalamata
- Number: 31

Youth career
- AO Chania

Senior career*
Years	Team	Apps	(Gls)
2009–2012	AO Chania		
2012–2013	Doxa Drama	0	(0)
2013–2014	Episkopi	23	(0)
2014	Aris	0	(0)
2014–2015	Panionios	0	(0)
2016	Krousonas		
2016–2018	Apollon Pontus	8	(0)
2018–2020	Ergotelis	20	(0)
2020–2023	Episkopi	37	(0)
2023–2025	Chania	56	(0)
2025–	Kalamata	2	(0)
- * Club domestic league appearances and goals as of 25 January 2026

Manolis Kalogerakis (Greek: Μανώλης Καλογεράκης; born 12 March 1992) is a Greek professional footballer who plays as a goalkeeper for Super League 2 club Kalamata.
