= Alexis Seliniotakis =

Greek footballer

Personal information
- Full name: Alexandros Seliniotakis
- Date of birth: 10 July 1989 (age 37)
- Place of birth: Chania, Crete, Greece
- Height: 1.89 m (6 ft 2 in)
- Position: Defensive midfielder

Youth career
- 1996–2003: AO Chania

Senior career*
Years	Team	Apps	(Gls)
2003–2005	AO Chania	16	(0)
2005–2007	Platanias	51	(1)
2007–2012	AO Chania	112	(7)
2012–2014	Episkopi	38	(4)
2014–2017	AO Chania	73	(2)
2017–2020	Chania	53	(0)
2020–2021	Diagoras	16	(0)
2021	Panachaiki		
2022	Episkopi	0	(0)
2022–2026	Aris Souda		
- * Club domestic league appearances and goals as of 21 April 2021

Alexis Seliniotakis (Greek: Αλέξης Σελινιωτάκης; born 10 July 1989) is a Greek former professional footballer who played as a defensive midfielder.

== Honours ==
Platanias

- Chania FCA Cup: 2005–06

AO Chania

- Chania FCA Cup: 2007–08, 2009–10
- Delta Ethniki: 2009–10

Chania

- Gamma Ethniki: 2014–15
