= Božidar Tadić =

Serbian footballer

Personal information
- Date of birth: 14 July 1983 (age 43)
- Place of birth: Loznica, SFR Yugoslavia
- Height: 1.78 m (5 ft 10 in)
- Position: Left winger

Youth career
- 1998–1999: FK Loznica
- 1999–2003: Mladi Obilić

Senior career*
Years	Team	Apps	(Gls)
2003–2006	Obilić	40	(2)
2006–2010	Panserraikos	98	(7)
2011	OFI	10	(0)
2011	Veria	12	(1)
2012	Panserraikos	16	(4)
2012–2013	Niki Volos	25	(1)
2013	Episkopi	11	(0)
2014–2015	Panserraikos		
2015	Sparti		
2016	Aiginiakos		
2016–2017	Rodos		
2017	Elpis Skoutari		
2017–2018	Doxa Vyronas		
2018	Serres 1800		
2019–2021	Serbian White Eagles	11	(4)
- * Club domestic league appearances and goals as of 9 September 2019

Božidar Tadić (Serbian Cyrillic: Божидар Taдић, born 14 July 1983) is a Serbian former footballer who played as a midfielder.

== Club career ==
=== Serbia ===
Tadić played in his country's top-tier league, the First League of Serbia and Montenegro, initially in 2003 with Obilić.

=== Greece ===
In 2006, he played abroad in the Beta Ethniki with Panserraikos. In the 2007-08 season, he assisted the team in securing promotion to the Super League Greece after winning the league. After a season in the top flight, Panserraikos were relegated but returned in the 2010-11 season. Tadić would appear in 19 matches and record 2 goals in his debut season in the top division. Meanwhile, when Panserraikos were relegated from the top tier, he extended his contract for another three years. In his return to the first division, he made 10 appearances.

After a four-year stint with Panserraikos, he returned to the Beta Ethniki initially with OFI, and later with Veria For the remainder of the 2011-12 season, he returned to his former club Panserraikos. In the summer of 2012, he was linked to a possible move to Kazakhstan but ultimately rejected the offer. His contract with Panserraikos was also not renewed for another season. Instead, he played the 2012-13 season with Niki Volos after securing a one-year deal.

In 2013, he played a single season with Episkopi in the second division. Following his single stint with Episkopi, he was released and returned to his former club, Panserraikos, in 2014. In 2015, he played in the Gamma Ethniki with A.E. Sparti. Following a dispute over wages, he departed from Sparti in the winter of 2016. He would ultimately land a contract with Aiginiakos in March 2016. His tenure with Aiginiakos was short-lived as he would shortly after sign with Rodos.

He would play the remainder of his stint in Greece with Elpis Skoutari, Doxa Vyronas, and Serres 1800.

=== Canada ===
After over a decade in Greece, he pursued his career further abroad in the Southern Ontario-based Canadian Soccer League in 2019 with the Serbian White Eagles FC. In his debut season with the Serbs, he helped the club secure a playoff berth by finishing fifth in the First Division. Tadić would contribute a goal in the opening round of the postseason against SC Waterloo Region, where the White Eagles were eliminated from the competition after a penalty shootout. He would re-sign with the White Eagles for the following season. For the second consecutive season, the Serbs qualified for the postseason by finishing fourth in the standings. The western Toronto side was eliminated in the preliminary round of the playoffs by FC Vorkuta.

Tadić returned for his third and final season in 2021. The Serbs qualified for the playoffs for the third consecutive season, where the club was defeated in the semifinal round by Scarborough SC.

== Honours ==
Panserraikos F.C.

- Beta Ethniki: 2007–08

== External sources ==
- Božidar Tadić at Soccerway (archived)
- Božidar Tadić at Dekisa.Tripod
