= Jesse Darko =

Austrian footballer

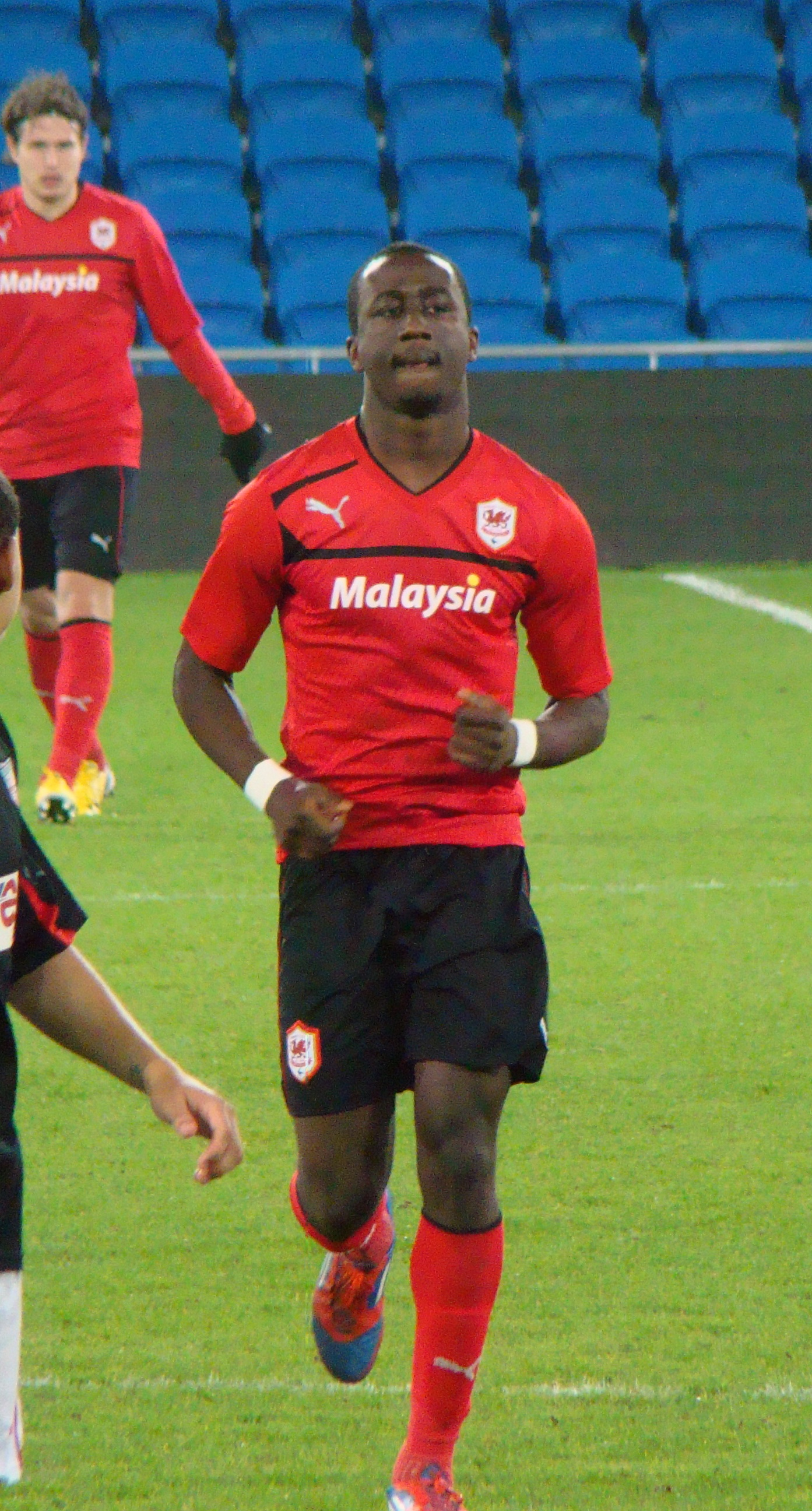
- Darko playing for Cardiff City in 2013.

Personal information
- Full name: Jesse Asieddu Darko
- Date of birth: 29 November 1993 (age 32)
- Place of birth: Austria
- Height: 1.88 m (6 ft 2 in)
- Position: Striker

Team information
- Current team: Chatham Town

Youth career
- 2007–2010: Bromley
- 2010–2012: Cardiff City

Senior career*
Years	Team	Apps	(Gls)
2012–2013	Cardiff City	0	(0)
2013	→ AFC Wimbledon (loan)	12	(0)
2013–2014	Episkopi	4	(1)
2014–2015	Kingstonian	22	(5)
2015–2017	Greenwich Borough		
2017	Glebe		
2017–	Chatham Town		
- * Club domestic league appearances and goals as of 18:45, 21 May 2015 (UTC)

Jesse Asieddu Darko (born 29 November 1993) is an Austrian footballer who plays as a striker for Chatham Town.

== Career ==
=== Early years ===
Born in Austria, Darko moved to England at the age of 10. His goal scoring exploits for Bromley's youth teams attracted the interest of Cardiff City, aged 16. His parents are originally from Ghana.

=== Cardiff City ===
Having failed to make an appearance for the first team, Darko was loaned out to League Two side AFC Wimbledon on 21 February 2013 on an initial one-month deal. Reunited with former teammates Jonathan Meades and Kevin Sainte-Luce, the trio developed at the South Wales club under the guidance of Neal Ardley.

On 23 February 2013, Darko made his professional debut for AFC Wimbledon in a 1–0 win over Dagenham & Redbridge, coming on as a second-half substitute for Gary Alexander. After helping Wimbledon secure their Football League status, Darko returned to Cardiff, where he was released.

=== Episkopi ===
On 25 July 2013, Darko joined Greek Football League South Group side Episkopi on a three-year contract. He made his debut on 30 September 2013, coming off the bench in a 3–0 win against Fostiras. Darko went on to make a further three appearances, scoring in his final game for the club on 20 October 2013. He later cancelled his contract with the Greek club for personal reasons.

=== Kingstonian ===
Darko returned to England ahead of the 2014–15 season, and enjoyed a trial at Chesterfield in November 2014. Despite having his initial trial extended, a contract was not offered to the striker. In December 2014, he joined Kingstonian. He made his debut in a 2–0 win at Walton Casuals in the Isthmian League Cup, scoring the opener just 35 minutes into his K's career. He finished the 2014-15 campaign with five goals in 22 appearances, having been deployed as an impact substitute by manager Tommy Williams for much of the season.

=== Greenwich Borough ===
Darko joined Greenwich Borough shortly after his departure from Kingstonian, and scored on his debut in a 2-1 cup victory over Phoenix Sports. With his side finishing as champions of the Southern Counties East League and earning promotion to the Isthmian Division One South, he managed just eight appearances during the season. Managing six wins and two draws during his involvement, Darko suffered two horrific injuries and faced a prolonged spell on the sidelines.

On 29 August 2015, while playing in an FA Cup match at Beckenham Town, Darko collided with the opposing goalkeeper and suffered a broken fibula. Making his return in late February, he suffered a second leg break a week later against Lordswood on 27 February 2016.

In September 2017 he joined Glebe of the Southern Counties East League Premier Division. Shortly after he transferred to league rivals Chatham Town.
