= Stefanos Souloukos =

Greek association football player (born 2001)

Personal information
- Date of birth: 4 January 2001 (age 25)
- Place of birth: Larissa, Greece
- Height: 1.92 m (6 ft 3 1/2 in)
- Position: Goalkeeper

Team information
- Current team: Panserraikos
- Number: 1

Youth career
- 2008–2017: AEL

Senior career*
Years	Team	Apps	(Gls)
2017–2025	AEL	63	(0)
2025–2026	Iraklis	0	(0)
2026–	Panserraikos	0	(0)

International career^{‡}
2018	Greece U19	1	(0)
- * Club domestic league appearances and goals as of 18 August 2025 ‡ National team caps and goals as of 19 December 2018

Stefanos Souloukos (Greek: Στέφανος Σουλούκος; born 4 January 2001) is a Greek professional association football player who plays as a goalkeeper for Super League 2 club Panserraikos.

== Career ==
Souloukos comes from the youth ranks of Larisa.

== Career stats ==
As of 18 June 2025

Club	Season	League			Cup		Continental		Other		Total	
Club	Season	Division	Apps	Goals	Apps	Goals	Apps	Goals	Apps	Goals	Apps	Goals
Larisa	2020–21	Super League Greece 2	1	0	0	0	—		—		1	0
Larisa	2021–22	Super League Greece 2	5	0	2	0	—		—		7	0
Larisa	2022–23	Super League Greece 2	16	0	0	0	—		—		16	0
Larisa	2023–24	Super League Greece 2	28	0	3	0	—		—		31	0
Larisa	2024–25	Super League Greece 2	14	0	1	0	—		—		15	0
Larisa	Total		65	0	6	0	0	0	0	0	71	0
Career total			65	0	6	0	0	0	0	0	71	0
