= 2012–13 Football League 2 (Greece) =

Football League 2
- Season: 2012–13
- Champions: Fostiras (South); Apollon Kalamarias (North)
- Promoted: Fostiras; Acharnaikos; Episkopi; Chania; Paniliakos; Glyfada; Apollon Kalamarias; Kassiopi; Aiginiakos; Tyrnavos; Vataniakos; Zakynthos
- Relegated: None

The 2012–13 Football League 2 was the 30th season since the official establishment of the third tier of Greek football in 1983. It is scheduled to start on 21 October 2012. 25 teams are separated into two groups, 13 in Group 1 (South) and 12 in Group 2 (North) according to geographical criteria.

== Southern Group ==
=== Teams ===
Location of teams in South Group of 2012–13 Football League 2

Team	Location	Last season
Fostiras	Athens	D Group 8, 1st
Asteras Magoula	Magoula	8th
Chania	Chania	7th
Glyfada	Athens	4th
Panegialios	Aigio	D Group 6, 1st
Kalamata	Kalamata	5th
Paniliakos	Pyrgos	3rd
Proodeftiki	Athens	9th
Korinthos	Korinthos	D Group 7, 1st
Rouvas	Gergeri	6th
Ethnikos Asteras	Athens	FL, 17th
Episkopi	Episkopi	D Group 10, 1st
Acharnaikos	Athens	D Group 9, 1st

=== Standings ===
Pos	Team	Pld	W	D	L	GF	GA	GD	Pts	Promotion
1	Fostiras (C, P)	24	12	7	5	28	13	+15	43	Promotion to Football League
2	Panegialios (P)	24	12	6	6	37	21	+16	42	Promotion to Football League
3	Acharnaikos (P)	24	12	5	7	34	21	+13	41	Promotion to Football League
4	Episkopi (P)	24	11	6	7	36	26	+10	39 (Note: AST 2-1 EPI; EPI 2-0 AST)	Promotion to Football League
5	Asteras Magoula (P)	24	11	6	7	32	26	+6	39	Promotion to Football League
6	Chania (P)	24	11	5	8	31	24	+7	38	Promotion to Football League
7	Paniliakos (P)	24	8	10	6	30	24	+6	34 (Note: PAN 4-1 GLI; GLI 1-0 PAN)	Promotion to Football League
8	Glyfada (P)	24	8	10	6	33	33	0	34	Promotion to Football League
9	Proodeftiki (Note: Proodeftiki was docked 2 points.)	24	10	6	8	34	26	+8	34	
10	Rouvas	24	8	6	10	27	27	0	30	
10	Korinthos	24	5	11	8	24	28	−4	26	
12	Kalamata	24	5	8	11	18	23	−5	23	
13	Ethnikos Asteras (Note: Championship organizer cancelled matches of Ethnikos Asteras against Korinthos (0-3) and Panegialios (0-3) and was docked 2 points after HFF decision because of debt to football players. Ethnikos Asteras forfeited from the league.)	24	0	0	24	0	72	−72	−2	

Source: Football League 2 standings (in Greek)
Rules for classification: 1st points; 2nd head-to-head points; 3rd head-to-head goal difference
(C) Champions; (P) Promoted

=== Results ===
Home \ Away	ACH	MGL	CHA	EPI	EAS	FOS	GLY	KAL	KOR	PEG	PNL	PRO	ROU
Acharnaikos		2–1	2–0	2–1	3–0	0–1	3–0	1–1	2–1	1–1	3–1	1–0	1–0
Asteras Magoula	2–1		0–0	2–1	3–0	2–1	2–2	1–0	0–0	0–2	2–1	2–3	2–2
Chania	1–0	0–2		3–6	3–0	2–1	2–0	1–1	1–0	0–1	0–0	1–1	3–2
Episkopi	2–1	2–0	0–3		3–0	0–2	2–2	3–1	4–1	1–0	1–1	1–0	1–0
Ethnikos Asteras	0–3	0–3	0–3	0–3		0–3	0–3	0–3	0–3	0–3	0–3	0–3	0–3
Fostiras	1–1	2–0	1–0	2–0	3–0		2–1	2–0	1–0	1–0	0–0	1–0	0–0
Glyfada	1–0	3–3	1–0	1–1	3–0	2–2		0–0	1–1	1–3	1–0	3–1	2–1
Kalamata	0–1	2–0	1–1	0–1	3–0	1–0	1–1		0–0	1–2	1–1	0–1	1–0
Korinthos	1–1	0–2	1–3	0–0	3–0	1–1	2–0	1–0		1–1	2–2	2–2	1–0
Panegialios	2–2	1–1	1–0	2–1	3–0	1–0	1–2	1–0	3–0		2–2	4–1	0–1
Paniliakos	1–0	1–0	0–1	1–1	3–0	0–0	4–1	1–1	2–1	1–0		1–1	1–2
Proodeftiki	2–1	0–1	2–1	1–0	3–0	1–1	0–0	3–0	1–1	2–1	2–3		0–1
Rouvas	1–2	0–1	1–2	1–1	3–0	1–0	2–2	1–0	1–1	2–2	2–0	0–4	

Legend: Blue = home team win; Yellow = draw; Red = away team win.

=== Top scorers ===
Rank	Player	Club	Goals
1	(Greece) Anastasios Triantafyllou	Episkopi	7
2	(Greece) Spiros Dorovinis	Fostiras	4
2	(Greece) Vasilis Bounas	Panegialios	4
2	(Greece) Giannis Lazanas	Panegialios	4
5	(Greece) Andreas Nomikos	Paniliakos	3
5	(Greece) Giorgos Panagiotopoulos	Proodeftiki	3
5	(Greece) Alexis Seliniotakis	Episkopi	3
5	(Greece) Nikos Lekkas	Proodeftiki	3
5	(Greece) Kostas Neofytos	Acharnaikos	3
5	(Greece) Giannis Chrysafis	Asteras Magoula	3

Updated to games played on 6 January 2013.

== Northern Group ==
=== Teams ===
Location of teams in North Group of 2012–13 Football League 2

Team	Location	Last season
Apollon Kalamarias	Thessaloniki	4th
Zakynthos	Zakynthos	2nd
Odysseas Kordeliou	Thessaloniki	D Group 2, 1st
Doxa Kranoula	Kranoula (Ioannina)	9th
Ethnikos Sidirokastro	Sidirokastro	D Group 1, 1st
Oikonomos	Tsaritsani	3rd
Vataniakos	Katerini	8th
Anagennisi Karditsa	Karditsa	D Group 4, 1st
Tilikratis	Lefkada	6th
Kassiopi	Kassiopi	D Group 5, 1st
Tyrnavos 2005	Tyrnavos	7th
Aiginiakos	Aiginio	Eps Pierias A, 1st

=== Standings ===
Pos	Team	Pld	W	D	L	GF	GA	GD	Pts	Promotion
1	Apollon Kalamarias (P)	22	14	6	2	33	12	+21	48	Promotion to Football League
2	Anagennisi Karditsa (P)	22	14	5	3	42	19	+23	47	Promotion to Football League
3	Kassiopi (P)	22	14	3	5	35	13	+22	45	Promotion to Football League
4	Aiginiakos (P)	22	9	10	3	34	21	+13	37	Promotion to Football League
5	Tyrnavos (P)	22	11	2	9	28	26	+2	35	Promotion to Football League
6	Vataniakos (Note: Vataniakos were promoted due to the bankruptcy of AEK Athens.) (P)	22	9	4	9	27	30	−3	31	Promotion to Football League
7	Zakynthos (P)	22	8	5	9	22	25	−3	29 (Note: ZAK 2-1 ODK; ODK 0-1 ZAK)	Promotion to Football League
8	Odysseas Kordeliou	22	9	2	11	35	28	+7	29	
9	Ethnikos Sidirokastro	22	7	6	9	23	24	−1	27	
10	Doxa Kranoula	22	4	6	12	23	35	−12	18	
11	Tilikratis	22	3	6	13	17	37	−20	15	
12	Oikonomos (Note: Oikonomos forfeited from the league.)	22	1	3	18	6	55	−49	6	

Source: Football League 2 standings (in Greek)
Rules for classification: 1) points; 2) head-to-head points; 3) head-to-head goal difference
(P) Promoted

=== Results ===
Home \ Away	EGN	KRD	APK	DXK	ESI	KAS	ODY	OIK	TIL	TYR	VAT	ZAK
Aiginiakos		2–1	1–1	0–1	1–0	2–3	2–2	3–0	1–0	2–1	3–0	5–1
Anagennisi Karditsa	2–2		1–1	2–1	1–0	1–0	2–0	2–1	6–1	3–1	2–0	2–0
Apollon Kalamarias	1–1	0–0		6–2	1–0	0–0	1–0	3–0	2–0	1–0	1–2	1–0
Doxa Kranoula	0–0	3–4	1–2		0–0	0–1	2–4	3–0	2–1	0–2	2–2	1–1
Ethnikos Sidirokastro	2–2	2–0	1–1	2–1		2–0	0–3	0–0	2–2	2–1	2–0	3–0
Kassiopi	0–0	3–0	0–1	1–0	1–0		3–1	5–0	3–0	2–1	2–0	1–0
Odysseas Kordeliou	3–4	0–1	0–1	4–0	4–1	2–1		0–1	3–0	0–1	3–2	0–1
Oikonomos	0–0	0–3	1–2	0–3	0–3	0–3	0–3		0–3	2–2	0–3	0–3
Tilikratis	0–1	1–1	0–2	1–0	1–1	0–3	1–1	2–1		1–2	0–0	0–0
Tyrnavos	1–0	0–3	2–1	1–0	1–0	1–1	0–1	3–0	2–1		3–1	1–0
Vataniakos	2–2	0–4	0–1	1–1	1–0	0–1	2–0	3–0	2–1	3–1		1–0
Zakynthos	0–0	1–1	0–3	0–0	3–0	2–1	2–1	3–0	2–1	2–1	1–2	

Legend: Blue = home team win; Yellow = draw; Red = away team win.

=== Top scorers ===
Rank	Player	Club	Goals
1	(Greece) Christos Athanasiadis	Anagennisi Karditsa	7
1	(Greece) Ilias Manikas	Vataniakos	7
3	(Greece) Christos Karagiannis	Kassiopi	6
4	(Greece) Konstantinos Exarchos	Aiginiakos	4
4	(Greece) Matthaios Platakis	Aiginiakos	4
6	(Greece) Giorgos Kakavitsis	Tyrnavos 2005	3
6	(Greece) Pavlos Leptokaridis	Apollon Kalamarias	3
6	(Greece) Vasilis Sachinidis	Tilikratis	3
6	(Albania) Gentian Kiptiou	Tyrnavos 2005	3
6	(Greece) Fotis Kiskabanis	Apollon Kalamarias	3

Updated to games played on 6 January 2013.
