= Mario Gurma =

Albanian footballer

Personal information
- Date of birth: 14 April 1982 (age 44)
- Place of birth: Sarandë, Albania
- Height: 1.86 m (6 ft 1 in)
- Position: Striker

Senior career*
Years	Team	Apps	(Gls)
2005–2006	Levadiakos	27	(3)
2006–2007	Proodeftiki	15	(3)
2007–2008	Diagoras	6	(1)
2008–2009	Panachaiki	42	(20)
2009–2011	Panetolikos	42	(11)
2011–2012	Reggiana	26	(6)
2012–2013	Gavorrano	30	(8)
2013–2014	Olympiacos Volos	44	(24)
2014–2015	Lamia	20	(6)
2015–2016	Paganese	17	(2)
2016	Racing Roma	5	(2)
2016	Nuova Monterosi	12	(2)
2016–2017	Albalonga Calcio	16	(5)
2017	Campobasso	10	(1)
2018	Luftëtari	0	(0)
	Butrinti		(17)
- * Club domestic league appearances and goals as of 10 June 2021

Mario Gurma (born 14 April 1982) is an Albanian former professional footballer.

== Club career ==
Gurma previously played for Levadiakos in the Super League Greece and for Panetolikos in the Beta Ethniki. He also played in Italy for Reggiana and for U.S. Gavorrano and Tricase calcio. In summer 2013 he moved to Olympiacos Volos In January 2021, Gurma got out of retirement to help his hometown club Butrinti Sarandë get promoted to Albanian First League after 5 years, scoring the winning goal in the promotion/relegation play-off against Oriku.
