= Panserraikos F.C. =

Men's association football team in Greece

Panserraikos
- Full name: Panserraikos Football Club
- Nicknames: Liontaria (Lions); Kokkinoi (Reds); To Liontari (The Lion); Akanedes (Akanés)
- Founded: 1964; 62 years ago
- Ground: Serres Municipal Stadium
- Capacity: 9,500
- Owner: Tasos Kazias
- Chairman: Tasos Kazias
- Head coach: Konstantinos Georgiadis
- League: Super League Greece 2
- 2025–26: Super League Greece, 14th of 14 (relegated)
- Website: panserraikosfc.gr
Home colours	Away colours

Panserraikos Football Club (Greek: ΠΑΕ Πανσερραϊκός), the All-Serres Football Club, is a Greek football club based in Serres, Greece. Panserraikos is one of the most important and well-supported clubs in northern Greece and had a near-continuous presence in the First Division in the 1960s and 70s.

== History ==
Panserraikos was formed on 1964 in Serres, when two local clubs, Apollon and Iraklis, merged. Evangelos Chatziathanasiadis was the first president of Panserraikos, with Angelos Angelousis as honorary president and Theodoros Athanasiadis as vice president. The colors of the club were red and white, which symbolized the great power that came from this historic merger. Leo of Amphipolis was chosen as the brand that showed the strength and warlike virtues of the people of Serrai. Panserraikos participated in the national championships for the first time in the 1964–65 season. Then, they played in the Beta Ethniki, since both Apollon and Iraklis were playing in this category last season. The dynamics of the newly formed club was huge and so Panserraikos immediately won its promotion to the Alpha Ethniki, finishing first with a difference of 11 points from the second MENT.

Since their last relegation in 1992 the club had been struggling in the Beta Ethniki, and were even relegated to the Third Division twice, in 1993 and 1996, yet promptly returning to the second tier on both occasions. The club did come close to promotion a few times, missing out on 5 points in 1998 and on just one point in 2000.

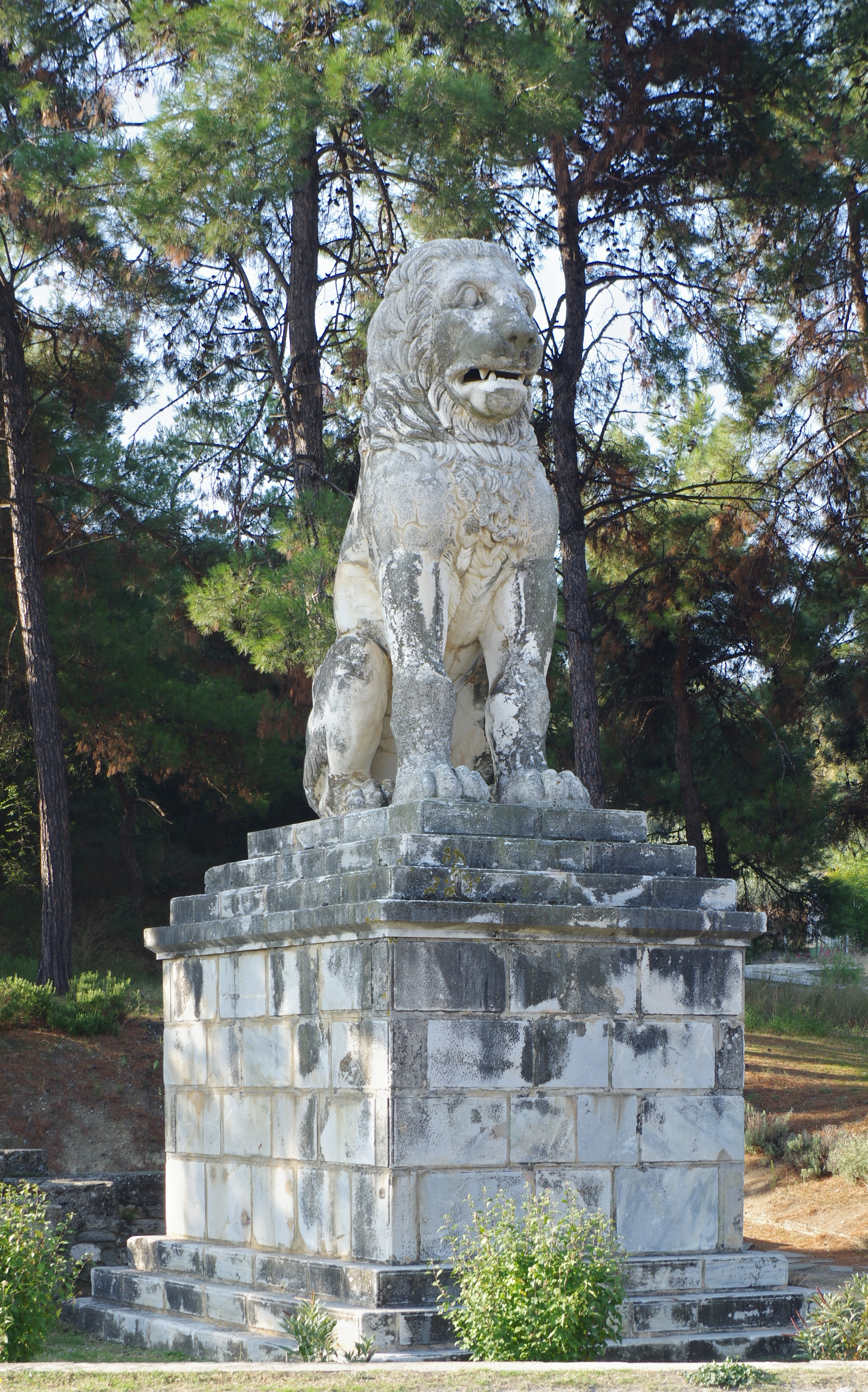
The Lion of Amphipolis

In 2008, Panserraikos managed to end a 16-year wait, gaining promotion to the Greek Super League. Managed by Giannis Papakostas, the club had been leading the Second Division table for the most part of the season, even securing a top-three spot with two games to spare – though they had narrowly escaped another relegation in the previous two seasons.

On 4 March 2009, Panserraikos won a historic match against Panathinaikos in the Olympic Stadium in Athens for the Greek Cup quarter finals with a score of 3–2 after being up 3–0 for 71 minutes. The first match leg ended at a 0–0 score. This result landed Panserraikos a spot in the final 4 of the Greek Cup where they played against AEK Athens for a spot in the finals. What made this result so special was that many starters for the team were either injured, or suspended. This was Panserraikos' first time in the semifinals of the Greek Cup. However, Panserraikos was relegated and played once again in the 2009–10 Beta Ethniki. After an indifferent start to their Beta Ethniki campaign, their season has now sparked into life after a surprise 3–1 win over giants Olympiakos in the Fourth Round of 2009–10 Greek Cup making it one of their bigger wins in recent history.

Panserraikos finished 5th in 2009–10 Beta Ethniki, but took the 1st place in the play-offs and gained the promotion to the 2010–11 Super League. For one more season in Super League Panserraikos didn't escape the relegation to 2011–12 Football League. After a disappointing season, Panserraikos finished 7th in 2011–12 Football League, and played in Football League for the second consecutive season. Panserraikos finished 8th in 2012–13 Football League, but was relegated to the new amateur 3rd Greek Division due to financial problems, after the death of its chairman Petros Theodoridis and a controversial and unsuccessful attempt by his son Lazaros Theodoridis to sell the club to Russian investor Mr. Konstantin Vostrikov, a self-declared business tycoon who was claiming to construct a 10,000-seat stadium. Mr. Vostrikov's faults as president and CEO together with the amateur handlings of his associate Dimitris Troshkov (member of the board) are considered to be the main and only causes of the club's relegation to the amateur 3rd Greek Division.

== Crest and colours ==
Panserraikos' previous crest

The club adopted the Lion of Amphipolis as their emblem. The typical kit of the team is that of a shirt with red and white vertical stripes, and red shorts and socks. The shirt has taken different forms during the history of the club, for example with thin or wider stripes. The second most common kit is the all-red one or the all-white one.

== Stadium ==
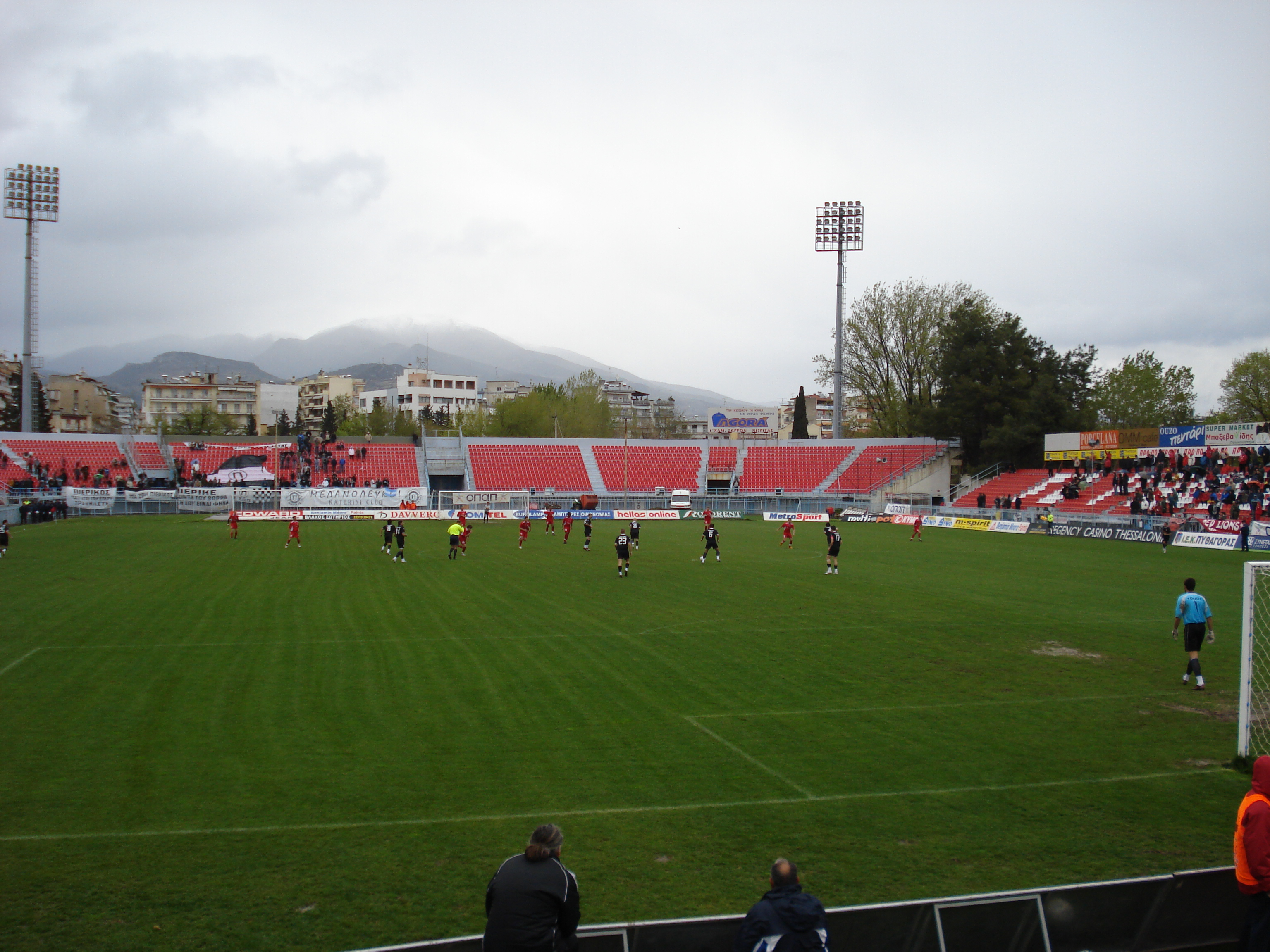
Serres Municipal Stadium

The headquarters of Panserraikos are the Serres Municipal Stadium. As its name implies, it belongs to the Municipality of Serres and has been assigned to the group for its needs. It is one of the oldest courts. It was originally built in 1926 and had a dirt terrain, while there was only one ramp on the west side. The capacity at that time did not exceed the 3,000 standing viewers. After 1964 when Panserraikos was basically founded, the team's need for a better pitch became more imperative. It was preceded in 1972 when the Municipal Stadium of Serres had a record audience of 14,200 in a match of Panserraikos with AEL. That year our team competed in the Football League and claimed the rise with the Thessalian team. That game had ended with a 1–1 draw, but Panserraikos was the one who eventually became champion. In 1976, the stadium took its current form in the stands. This year, work was done to build a turf. The stadium of Serres at that time contained 15,000 upright spectators. The facelift continued in an attempt to hide his age in 2005. It was then that 9,500 plastic seats were placed in all the stands. This brought down its capacity as it was natural. Finally, after years of waiting, headlights were installed.

== Players ==
=== Current squad ===
As of 15 September 2026

Note: Flags indicate national team as defined under FIFA eligibility rules; some limited exceptions apply. Players may hold more than one non-FIFA nationality.

No.	Pos.	Nation	Player
1	GK	GRE	Stefanos Souloukos
2	DF	GRE	Stathis Tachatos
4	DF	GRE	Aristotelis Karasalidis
5	DF	GRE	Theocharis Iliadis
7	MF	GRE	Alexandros Maskanakis
8	MF	GRE	Angelos Ikonomou
10	FW	BRA	Alex Teixeira
13	GK	GRE	Viktoras Sakalidis
14	DF	GRE	Marios Tsaousis
17	MF	GBS	Jorginho
19	MF	GRE	Giannis Pasas
21	MF	AUS	Christopher Bitzios
22	DF	GRE	Epaminondas Pantelakis
23	DF	GRE	Charalampos Georgiadis
26	MF	GRE	Paschalis Staikos
27	MF	GRE	Theodoros Vernardos
31	DF	FRA	Yoël Armougom
33	DF	GRE	Manolis Aliatidis
34	DF	GRE	Stavros Vasilakos

No.	Pos.	Nation	Player
38	MF	GRE	Ilias Tselios
40	GK	GRE	Thomas-Paisios Arabatzis
44	DF	GRE	Stavros Momtsios
45	MF	GRE	Stergios Koutrovelis
46	DF	GRE	Stefanos Ouliaris
47	MF	GRE	Ilias Moysidis (on loan from Iraklis)
55	GK	GRE	Michalis Pourliotopoulos
62	DF	GRE	Stathis Stefanidis
63	MF	GRE	Viktor Rumyantsev
69	DF	URU	Maximiliano Moreira
70	DF	GRE	Stelios Kitsiou
72	DF	GRE	Manolis Sbokos
73	MF	GRE	Vasilios Varsamis
77	GK	URU	Francisco Tinaglini
78	FW	GRE	Giannis Tsilingiris
79	MF	GRE	Alexandros Adam
93	MF	GRE	Grigorios Politakis
97	FW	GRE	Konstantinos Kotsopoulos

=== Out on loan ===
Note: Flags indicate national team as defined under FIFA eligibility rules; some limited exceptions apply. Players may hold more than one non-FIFA nationality.

No.	Pos.	Nation	Player
—	MF	GRE	Georgios Marinos (at Apollon Kalamarias until 30 June 2027)
—	MF	GRE	Alexandros Salvanos (at Apollon Paralimnio until 30 June 2027)

=== Records and statistics ===
Information correct as of the match played on 1 July 2026. Bold denotes an active player for the club.
The tables refer to Panserraikos' players in Super League Greece, Greek Football Cup, Second Division Greece, Third Division Greece and Delta Ethniki.

==== Top 10 Most Capped Players ====
Rank	Player	Years	App
1	(Greece) Dimitris Aivazidis	1979–1992	378
2	(Greece) Giorgos Georgiadis	2007–2011, 2019–2021	165
3	(Greece) Giannis Voskopoulos	2007–2011, 2015–2018	153
4	(Greece) Antonis Kyrou (Serbia) Božidar Tadić	1999–2006; 2006–2010, 2012, 2014–2015	148
5	(Greece) Giorgos Siakkas	2004–2009, 2012–2013, 2014–2018	145
6	(Greece) Dimitris Anakoglou	2008–2013, 2021–2024	139
7	(Greece) Nikos Arabatzis	2000–2005	113
8	(Greece) Christos Melissis	2001–2006	112
9	(Greece) Christos Routsis	2005–2010, 2014–2018	110
10	(Greece) Vangelis Mitsopoulos	2003–2007	108

==== Top 10 Goalscorers ====
Rank	Player	Years	Goals
1	(Greece) Thanasis Gogas	2004–2007, 2014–2015	34
2	(Greece) Giorgos Georgiadis	2007–2011, 2019–2021	30
3	(Serbia) Dušan Jovanović	1997–1998, 2002–2004	29
4	(Morocco) Hicham Kanis (Guinea) Sambégou Bangoura (Greece) Dimitris Gourtsas	2021–2023; 2009–2013; 2008–2009, 2011–2012, 2017–2018, 2019–2021	26
5	(Spain) Jefté Betancor	2024–2025	25
6	(Bulgaria) Nikolay Petrunov	1990–1992	23
7	(Greece) Giorgos Tsifoutis	1987–1990, 1999–2002	18
8	(Brazil) Leozinho (Serbia) Božidar Tadić	2009–2011; 2006–2010, 2012, 2014–2015	17
9	(Greece) Giorgos Gougoulias (Greece) Giorgos Panagiotidis	2007–2008, 2012–2013; 1999–2003	16
10	(Cape Verde) Furtado	2015–2016	13

== Honours ==
=== Greek League ===
- Second Division
  - Champions (5): 1964–65, 1971–72, 1979–80, 2007–08, 2022–23
- Third Division
  - Champions (2): 1993–94, 2014–15
- Fourth Division
  - Champions (1): 2019–20

=== League history ===
- 1964–1965: Division 2
- 1965–1971: Division 1
- 1971–1972: Division 2
- 1972–1979: Division 1
- 1979–1980: Division 2
- 1980–1984: Division 1
- 1984–1985: Division 2
- 1985–1986: Division 1
- 1986–1987: Division 2
- 1987–1988: Division 1
- 1988–1989: Division 2
- 1989–1992: Division 1
- 1992–1993: Division 2
- 1993–1994: Division 3
- 1994–1995: Division 2
- 1995–1996: Division 3
- 1996–2008: Division 2
- 2008–2009: Division 1
- 2009–2010: Division 2
- 2010–2011: Division 1
- 2011–2013: Division 2
- 2013–2015: Division 3
- 2015–2018: Division 2
- 2018–2019: Division 3
- 2019–2020: Division 4
- 2020–2021: Division 3
- 2021–2023: Division 2
- 2023–2026: Division 1
- 2026–present: Division 2

== Club records ==
- Record Attendance: 14,200 vs Larissa, Beta Ethniki, 25 June 1972
- Record League Home Victory: 6–1 vs AEL Limassol, Alpha Ethniki, 1969
- Record League Away Victory: 9–4 vs Levadiakos, Beta Ethniki, 29 March 1998
- Highest League Position: 8th in Alpha Ethniki, seasons 1969–1970 and 1980–1981
- Lowest League Position: 18th in Alpha Ethniki, season 1979–1980

== Notable managers ==
- (Romania) Ilie Oană 1969-1971
- (Czech Republic) Vladimír Táborský
- (Greece) Ioannis Gounaris
- (Greece) Christos Archontidis
- (Greece) Nikos Anastopoulos 1999-2000
- (Greece) Makis Katsavakis
- (Greece) Konstantinos Iosifidis
- (Serbia) Dušan Mitošević
- (Hungary) Lajos Détári 2005
- (Greece) Giannis Papakostas
- (Belgium) Hugo Broos 2008-2009
- (Spain) Ángel Pedraza
- (Argentina) Guillermo Ángel Hoyos 2009-2010
- (Serbia) Dragan Kokotović
- (Serbia) Momčilo Vukotić
- (Spain) Josu Uribe
- (Greece) Kostas Vasilakakis
- (Brazil) Paulo Campos
- (Greece) Pavlos Dermitzakis
- (Uruguay) Pablo García
