= Episkopi F.C. =

Episkopi
- Full name: Αθλητικός Όμιλος Επισκοπής; Athlitikós Ómilos Episkopís (Athletic Club of Episkopi)
- Founded: 1962; 64 years ago
- Ground: Gallos Stadium
- Capacity: 1,500
- Chairman: Michalis Nikolidakis
- Manager: Tomás Tengarrinha
- League: Gamma Ethniki
- 2025–26: Rethymno FCA First Division, 2nd (promoted)
- Website: https://episkopifc.gr/
Home colours	Away colours

ΑΟ Episkopi Football Club, short for Athlitikos Omilos Episkopis (Greek: Αθλητικός Όμιλος Επισκοπής), is a Greek football club based in Episkopi, Rethymno. It was founded in 1962.

== History ==
Episkopi made 11 appearances in the Delta Ethniki, where they have been playing continuously since 2003. In 2012, they were promoted to the Football League 2 for the first time in their history as champions of Delta Ethniki's 10th Group.

=== Crest and colours ===
Episkopi Logo until 2014

2014−current

== Honours ==
- Fourth Division
  - Winners (2): 2011–12, 2019–20
- Rethymno FCA Championship
  - Winners (4): 1989–90, 1993–94, 2000–01, 2017–18
- Rethymno FCA Cup
  - Winners (7): 2003–04, 2007–08, 2010–11, 2015–16, 2016–17, 2018–19, 2023–24
- Rethymno FCA Super Cup
  - Winners (8): 1994, 2000, 2001, 2008, 2011, 2016, 2017, 2018
