= 2016–17 AEL Kalloni F.C. season =

AEL Kalloni
2016–17 season
- Owner: (Greece) Nikos Michalakis
- Chairman: (Greece) Nikos Michalakis
- Head coach: (Greece) Giorgos Vazakas (7 July − 11 December 2016) (Greece) Dimitris Gavalas (12 December 2016 – 23 May 2017)
- Ground: Mytilene Municipal Stadium
- Football League: 17th (relegated)
- Greek Cup: Group stage
- Top goalscorer: League: Kyriakos Evaggelidakis; Michalis Frangos †; Aris Lambrakis (3); All: Michalis Frangos † (5)
Home colours	Away colours	Third colours

The 2016–17 season was AEL Kalloni's first season in the Football League following their relegation from the Super League Greece last season. Along with the Football League, the club also competed in the Greek Cup. The club was expelled from the league on 24 May 2017, due to unpaid debts to its former footballers Kostas Dafkos and Alexandros Chintaseli, and relegated to Gamma Ethniki.

== Club ==
=== Other information ===
Chairman	(Greece) Nikos Michalakis
Ground (capacity and dimensions)	Mytilene Municipal Stadium (3,000 / 102×65 metres)

Last updated: 1 July 2016
Source: AEL Kalloni F.C.

== Pre-season friendlies ==
Win Draw Loss Postponed

Date	Opponents	H / A	Result F – A	Scorers
9 August 2016	(Cyprus) Karmiotissa Pano Polemidion	A	0 – 1	
12 August 2016	(Cyprus) AEL Limassol	A	0 – 1	
3 September 2016	(Greece) OFI	A	0 – 2	
11 September 2016	(Greece) Kallithea	H	3 – 3	Stefanović (2) 47', 70', Lambrakis 88'
14 September 2016	(Greece) Panserraikos	H	1 – 0	Paraíba 45+'
17 September 2016	(Greece) Kallithea	A	3 – 1	Keri 46', Frangos 60', Stefanović 75'

Last updated: 17 September 2016
Source: AEL Kalloni F.C.

== Competitions ==
=== Overall ===
Competition	Started round	Current position / round	Final position / round	First match	Last match
Football League	—	17th	—	30 October 2016	21 May 2017^{1}
Greek Cup	Group stage	—	Group stage	25 October 2016	15 December 2016

Last updated: 24 May 2017
Source: Competitions

^{1}On 24 May 2017, the club was expelled from the league.

=== Overview ===
Competition	Record							
Competition	G	W	D	L	GF	GA	GD	Win %
Football League	34	4	7	23	21	75	−54	11.76
Greek Cup	3	0	0	3	3	8	−5	0.00
Total	37	4	7	26	24	83	−59	10.81

Updated to match played 24 May 2017
Source: Competitions

=== Football League ===
==== League table ====
Pos	Team	Pld	W	D	L	GF	GA	GD	Pts	Promotion or relegation
14	Kallithea	34	9	6	19	42	49	−7	33	
15	Panelefsiniakos (R)	34	6	10	18	21	56	−35	28	Relegation to FCA Championships (Note: Panelefsiniakos, AEL Kalloni, Chania and Panthrakikos were all relegated to Gamma Ethniki initially, but decided to withdraw before the league started because of financial problems, ultimately starting next season in the respective local FCA Championships.)
16	AEL Kalloni (Note: Kalloni were expelled from the league at 24 May 2017 and they were deducted 12 points.) (R)	34	4	7	23	21	75	−54	7	Relegation to FCA Championships
17	AO Chania (Note: AO Chania deducted 33 points from Hellenic Football Federation because playing games without a certificate of participation. At the end of the season, Chania merged with Kissamikos and formed AO Chania — Kissamikos, continuing in the same division.)	34	11	5	18	37	60	−23	5	
18	Panthrakikos (Note: Panthrakikos withdrew from the league at 26 January 2017 and they were deducted 18 points.) (R)	34	3	3	28	7	81	−74	−6	Relegation to FCA Championships

Source: Football League and footballleaguenews.gr
Rules for classification: 1) Points; 2) Head-to-head points; 3) Head-to-head goal difference; 4) Goals scored; 5) Goals against; 6) Play-offs (neutral ground, only used if needed to decide teams for promotion or relegation).
(R) Relegated

==== Results summary ====
Overall								Home						Away					
Pld	W	D	L	GF	GA	GD	Pts	W	D	L	GF	GA	GD	W	D	L	GF	GA	GD
34	4	7	23	21	75	−54	4	3	4	10	11	27	−16	1	3	13	10	48	−38

Last updated: 24 May 2017.
Source: Football League

==== Results by matchday ====
Round	1	2	3	4	5	6	7	8	9	10	11	12	13	14	15	16	17	18	19	20	21	22	23	24	25	26	27	28	29	30	31	32	33	34
Ground	A	A	H	A	H	A	H	A	H	H	A	H	A	H	A	H	A	H	H	A	H	—	H	A	H	A	A	H	A	H	A	—	—	—
Result	L	D	L	L	D	D	D	D	D	L	L	L	L	W	L	W	L	W	L	L	L	W	D	L	L	L	L	L	L	L	L	L	L	L
Position	18	17	17	17	17	17	16	17	17	17	18	18	18	16	16	16	16	15	15	16	16	16	15	16	16	16	17	17	17	17	17	17	17	17

Source: Superleague Greece
A = Away; H = Home; W = Win; D = Draw; L = Loss; = Relegation to 2017–18 Gamma Ethniki

==== Matches ====
The fixtures were announced on 5 September.

Win Draw Loss Postponed

30 October 2016 1	Acharnaikos	3–0	AEL Kalloni	Acharnes
15:00 (UTC+2)	Psianos 21'; Dunga 56'; Sotirakos 90'	Report		Stadium: Acharnes Municipal Stadium; Attendance: – Referee: Konstantinos Perrakis (Athens)

6 November 2016 2	OFI	2–2	AEL Kalloni	Heraklion
16:00 (UTC+2)	Ostojić 38'; Ogboe 68'	Report	60' Frangos; 88' Lambrakis	Stadium: Theodoros Vardinogiannis Stadium; Attendance: n/a Referee: Vasilios Panagiotopoulos (Aetolia-Acarnania)

26 November 2016 3	AEL Kalloni	0–2	Lamia	Mytilene
15:00 (UTC+2)		Report	12' Blažić; 17' Vasilogiannis	Stadium: Mytilene Municipal Stadium; Attendance: n/a Referee: Aggelos Zaravinos (Athens)

5 December 2016 4	Aris	5–0	AEL Kalloni	Thessaloniki
15:00 (UTC+2)	Ilić 12'; Tatos 75' 87'; Kapnidis 76'; Bargan 80'	Report	(red card) 86' Repetsas	Stadium: Kleanthis Vikelidis Stadium; Attendance: n/a Referee: Apostolos Simaiakis (Chalkidiki)

11 December 2016 5	AEL Kalloni	1–1	Panthrakikos	Mytilene
13:30 (UTC+2)	Burdujan 6'	Report	18' Plegas	Stadium: Mytilene Municipal Stadium; Attendance: n/a Referee: Konstantinos Antoniou (Athens)

18 December 2016 6	Sparti	1–1	AEL Kalloni	Sparta
15:00 (UTC+2)	Anastasakos 31'	Report	41' Frangos	Stadium: Sparta Municipal Stadium; Attendance: n/a Referee: Marios Lambropoulos (Elis)

23 December 2016 7	AEL Kalloni	0–0	Anagennisi Karditsa	Mytilene
15:00 (UTC+2)		Report		Stadium: Mytilene Municipal Stadium; Attendance: n/a Referee: Angelos Evangelou (Athens)

4 January 2017 8	Aiginiakos	0–0	AEL Kalloni	Aiginio
14:00 (UTC+2)		Report		Stadium: Giannis Paralykidis Stadium; Attendance: n/a Referee: Nikolaos Theodoropoulos (Florina)

8 January 2017 9	AEL Kalloni	1–1	Kissamikos	Mytilene
15:00 (UTC+2)	Sofianis 87'	Report	63' Mantzis	Stadium: Mytilene Municipal Stadium; Attendance: n/a Referee: Stavros Dimitropoulos (West Attica)

15 January 2017 10	AEL Kalloni	1–4	Apollon Smyrni	Mytilene
15:00 (UTC+2)	Frangos 87' (pen.)	Report	13' Petropoulos; 31', 55' Almpanis; 52' Siatravanis	Stadium: Mytilene Municipal Stadium; Attendance: n/a Referee: Panagiotis Kakridis (Corinthia)

18 January 2017 11	Panelefsiniakos	3–1	AEL Kalloni	Eleusis
13:30 (UTC+2)	Angeloudis 2'; Printemps 71'; Stamatakis 76'	Report	55' Evaggelidakis	Stadium: Eleusis Municipal Stadium; Attendance: n/a Referee: Georgios Papadopoulos (Achaea)

22 January 2017 12	AEL Kalloni	0–2	Trikala	Mytilene
15:00 (UTC+2)		Report	7' Golias; 31' Stevanović	Stadium: Mytilene Municipal Stadium; Attendance: n/a Referee: Evangelos Kordolaimis (East Attica)

29 January 2017 13	Chania	4–0	AEL Kalloni	Eleusis
15:00 (UTC+2)	Stamatis 9'; Varouchas 22'; Fourlanos 42'; Apostolopoulos 45+1'	Report		Stadium: Eleusis Municipal Stadium; Attendance: n/a Referee: Spyridon Michelis (Piraeus)

5 February 2017 14	AEL Kalloni	2–0	Kallithea	Mytilene
15:00 (UTC+2)	Gioukaris 35'; Lambrakis 60' (pen.)	Report		Stadium: Mytilene Municipal Stadium; Attendance: n/a Referee: Ioannis Kakridis (Corinthia)

12 February 2017 15	Panegialios	2–0	AEL Kalloni	Aigio
13:30 (UTC+2)	Kritikos 65'; Skartsilas 86'	Report		Stadium: Aigio Municipal Stadium; Attendance: n/a Referee: Marios Viskadouros (Heraklion)

19 February 2017 16	AEL Kalloni	1–0	Agrotikos Asteras	Mytilene
15:00 (UTC+2)	Repetsas 54'	Report		Stadium: Mytilene Municipal Stadium; Attendance: n/a Referee: Andreas Gamaris (Athens)

22 February 2017 17	Panserraikos	3–1	AEL Kalloni	Serres
15:00 (UTC+2)	Gkourtsas 30'; Routsis 45', 77'	Report	66' Cissé	Stadium: Serres Municipal Stadium; Attendance: n/a Referee: Evangelos Kiotzenis (Xanthi)

26 February 2017 18	AEL Kalloni	2–1	Acharnaikos	Mytilene
15:00 (UTC+2)	Cissé 45+'; Sofianis 55'	Report	53' Mezini	Stadium: Mytilene Municipal Stadium; Attendance: n/a Referee: Alexandros Tsamouris (Piraeus)

5 March 2017 19	AEL Kalloni	1–2	OFI	Mytilene
15:00 (UTC+2)	Evaggelidakis 24'	Report	37' Kotsios; 85' Ogboe	Stadium: Mytilene Municipal Stadium; Attendance: n/a Referee: Vasilios Fotias (Pella)

12 March 2017 20	Lamia	4–0	AEL Kalloni	Lamia
15:00 (UTC+2)	Durmishaj 12'; Matsoukas 22', 29'; Čović 90+'	Report		Stadium: Lamia Municipal Stadium; Attendance: n/a Referee: Alexandros Katsikogiannis (Epirus)

19 March 2017 21	AEL Kalloni	0–1	Aris	Mytilene
15:00 (UTC+2)		Report	90+5' Ilić	Stadium: Mytilene Municipal Stadium; Attendance: n/a Referee: Spyridon Michelis (Piraeus)

– 22	Panthrakikos	0–3 (w/o)^{a}	AEL Kalloni	–
–				Stadium: – Attendance: – Referee: –

26 March 2017 23	AEL Kalloni	0–0	Sparti	Mytilene
15:00 (UTC+3)		Report		Stadium: Mytilene Municipal Stadium; Attendance: n/a Referee: Aggelos Aggelakis (Macedonia)

2 April 2017 24	Anagennisi Karditsa	1–0	AEL Kalloni	Karditsa
13:00 (UTC+3)	Vukomanovic 87'	Report		Stadium: Karditsa Municipal Stadium; Attendance: n/a Referee: Georgios Meltzanidis (Imathia)

9 April 2017 25	AEL Kalloni	1–3	Aiginiakos	Mytilene
16:00 (UTC+3)	Zouliotis 10'	Report	2' Zguri; 4' Tsolakidis; 87' Burdujan	Stadium: Mytilene Municipal Stadium; Attendance: n/a Referee: Ioannis Neofytiadis (Corinthia)

12 April 2017 26	Kissamikos	4–1	AEL Kalloni	Mournies
14:30 (UTC+3)	Martínez 21', 87'; Kike 36'; Stojanov 80'	Report	55' (pen.) Lambrakis	Stadium: Perivolia Municipal Stadium; Attendance: n/a Referee: Konstantinos Antoniou (Athens)

23 April 2017 27	Apollon Smyrni	4–0	AEL Kalloni	Rizoupoli
16:00 (UTC+3)	Petropoulos 23', 52'; Siatravanis 37'; Kallergis 90+2'	Report		Stadium: Georgios Kamaras Stadium; Attendance: n/a Referee: Petros Tsagkarakis (Chania)

1 May 2017 28	AEL Kalloni	1–3	Panelefsiniakos	Mytilene
16:00 (UTC+3)	Zouliotis 43'	Report	44', 49' Konstantinidis; 64' Kasneci	Stadium: Mytilene Municipal Stadium; Attendance: n/a Referee: Aggelos Zaravinos (Athens)

7 May 2017 29	Trikala	5–0	AEL Kalloni	Trikala
17:00 (UTC+3)	Kouskounas 14', 55'; Sandravelis 35'; Baykara 39'; Giannitsanis 81'	Report		Stadium: Trikala Municipal Stadium; Attendance: n/a Referee: Nikolaos Roussos-Bekertzis (Preveza)

12 May 2017 30	AEL Kalloni	0–1	Chania	Mytilene
17:00 (UTC+3)		Report	86' Apostolopoulos	Stadium: Mytilene Municipal Stadium; Attendance: n/a Referee: Evangelos Kordolaimis (East Attica)

21 May 2017 31	Kallithea	4–1	AEL Kalloni	Kallithea
17:00 (UTC+3)	Patas 9'; Stamopoulos 48'; Stamatakos 51'; Krevvatas 73'		85' Evaggelidakis	Stadium: Grigoris Lambrakis Stadium; Referee: Dimitrios Psychoulas (Boeotia)

– 32	AEL Kalloni	0–3 (w/o)^{b}	Panegialios	–
–				Stadium: – Referee: –

– 33	Agrotikos Asteras	3–0 (w/o)^{b}	AEL Kalloni	–
–				Stadium: – Referee: –

– 34	AEL Kalloni	0–3 (w/o)^{b}	Panserraikos	–
–				Stadium: – Referee: –

a. Panthrakikos retired from the league.
b. AEL Kalloni were expelled from the league.

Last updated: 24 May 2017
Source: Football League

=== Greek Cup ===
==== Second round ====
Pos	Team	Pld	W	D	L	GF	GA	GD	Pts	Qualification
1	PAS Giannina	3	3	0	0	5	1	+4	9	Round of 16
2	Xanthi	3	1	1	1	4	3	+1	4	Round of 16
3	Agrotikos Asteras	3	1	1	1	3	3	0	4	
4	Kalloni	3	0	0	3	3	8	−5	0	

Source: epo.gr

Win Draw Loss Postponed

25 October 2016 1	AEL Kalloni	1–2	Agrotikos Asteras	Mytilene
15:00 (UTC+3)	Frangos 18'	Report	54' Tegousis; 86' Taianan	Stadium: Mytilene Municipal Stadium; Attendance: n/a Referee: Angelos Zaravinos (Athens)

1 December 2016 2	Xanthi	3–1	AEL Kalloni	Xanthi
15:00 (UTC+2)	Ranos 3'; Lazić 23'; Nieto 47'	Report	70' Frangos	Stadium: Xanthi FC Arena; Attendance: n/a Referee: Ananias Fotiadis (Serres)

15 December 2016 3	AEL Kalloni	1–3	PAS Giannina	Mytilene
17:00 (UTC+2)	Triantafyllou 83'	Report	5' Giakos; 42' Garoufalias; 62' Skondras	Stadium: Mytilene Municipal Stadium; Attendance: n/a Referee: Spyridon Michelis (Piraeus)

Last updated: 15 December 2016
Source: HFF

== Players ==
=== Squad statistics ===
==== Appearances and goals ====
Key

**No.** = Squad number

**Pos.** = Playing position

**Apps** = Appearances

**GK** = Goalkeeper

**DF** = Defender

**MF** = Midfielder

**FW** = Forward

Numbers in parentheses denote appearances as substitute. Players with number struck through and marked † left the club during the playing season.

As of 24 May 2017

No.	Pos.	Name	Football League		Greek Cup		Total	
No.	Pos.	Name	Apps	Goals	Apps	Goals	Apps	Goals
2	MF	(Greece) Dimitris Zouliotis (c)	28	2	2	0	30	2
5	MF	(Greece) Lazaros Tzelidis	7 (3)	0	2	0	9 (3)	0
7	FW	(Greece) Zisis Naoum	2 (3)	0	0	0	2 (3)	0
9	FW	(Greece) Giorgos-Rafail Eleftheriadis	1 (3)	0	0	0	1 (3)	0
10	MF	(Serbia) Milan Svojić	6 (4)	0	0	0	6 (4)	0
11	FW	(Niger) (Mali) Mahamane Cissé	12 (1)	2	0	0	12 (1)	2
12	FW	(Greece) Aris Lambrakis	17 (10)	3	2 (1)	0	19 (11)	3
16	DF	(Greece) Kyriakos Evaggelidakis	25 (1)	3	1	0	26 (1)	3
17	GK	(Greece) Fotis Papazoglou	1	0	0	0	1	0
19	FW	(Greece) Giorgos Sofianis	17 (8)	2	1 (1)	0	18 (9)	2
20	DF	(Greece) Antonis Karageorgis	3	0	0	0	3	0
21	MF	(Greece) Giorgos Agrimakis	5 (11)	0	0	0	5 (11)	0
22	MF	(Greece) Giannis Giorgou	14 (6)	0	2 (1)	0	16 (7)	0
23	DF	(Cyprus) Giannis Savva	25 (2)	0	1 (2)	0	26 (4)	0
24	FW	(Greece) Giorgos Dikaiopoulos	0 (5)	0	0	0	0 (5)	0
25	DF	(Greece) Thanasis Repetsas	23	1	2	0	25	1
26	MF	(Greece) Rafail Gioukaris	21 (3)	1	1 (1)	0	22 (4)	1
27	MF	(Greece) Patroklos Krotsidas	1 (1)	0	0	0	1 (1)	0
32	FW	(Greece) Dimitris Litainas	23	0	0 (1)	0	23 (1)	0
33	DF	(Greece) Giorgos Mexis	1 (6)	0	0	0	1 (6)	0
37	MF	(Greece) Lambros Triantafyllou	4 (5)	0	0 (1)	1	4 (6)	1
40	GK	(Greece) Nikos Mallis	0 (2)	0	0	0	0 (2)	0
44	GK	(Greece) Panagiotis Papadopoulos	7 (1)	0	0	0	7 (1)	0
77	DF	(Egypt) Amir Azmy	6 (2)	0	0	0	6 (2)	0
87	GK	(Greece) Kostas Maniatis	16 (1)	0	3	0	19 (1)	0
—	GK	(Greece) Dimitris Tairis †	6 (1)	0	0	0	6 (1)	0
—	DF	(Greece) Spyros Apostolou †	16 (5)	0	3	0	19 (5)	0
—	DF	(Greece) Panagiotis Arnaoutoglou †	1	0	0	0	1	0
—	DF	(Greece) Stelios Pozatzidis †	6 (1)	0	3	0	9 (1)	0
—	MF	(Greece) Alexis Dallas †	5	0	2	0	7	0
—	MF	(Greece) Andreas Dambos †	0	0	0	0	0	0
—	MF	(Serbia) Stefan Stefanović †	0	0	0	0	0	0
—	FW	(Romania) Lucian Burdujan †	5 (1)	1	2	0	7 (1)	1
—	FW	(Greece) Alexandros Chintaseli †	0	0	1	0	1	0
—	FW	(Greece) Michalis Frangos †	13	3	2	2	15	5
—	FW	(Greece) Efthimis Gkamagkas †	0	0	0 (1)	0	0 (1)	0
—	FW	(Albania) (Greece) Florenc Keri †	3 (3)	0	2	0	5 (3)	0
—	FW	(Brazil) Anderson Paraíba †	8 (1)	0	1	0	9 (1)	0
—	–	Own goals	–	0	–	0	–	0

Source: AEL Kalloni

==== Top scorers ====
As of 24 May 2017

Place	Position	Nationality	Number	Name	Football League	Greek Cup	Total
1	FW	(Greece)	—	Michalis Frangos †	3	2	5
2	FW	(Greece)	12	Aris Lambrakis	3	0	3
2	DF	(Greece)	16	Kyriakos Evaggelidakis	3	0	3
3	MF	(Greece)	2	Dimitris Zouliotis	2	0	2
3	FW	(Niger) (Mali)	11	Mahamane Cissé	2	0	2
3	FW	(Greece)	19	Giorgos Sofianis	2	0	2
4	DF	(Greece)	25	Thanasis Repetsas	1	0	1
4	MF	(Greece)	26	Rafail Gioukaris	1	0	1
4	MF	(Greece)	37	Lambros Triantafyllou	0	1	1
4	FW	(Romania)	—	Lucian Burdujan †	1	0	1
**TOTALS**					**18**	**3**	21

Source: Superleague Greece

==== Suspended players ====
Date	Pos.	Name	Reason	Out for	Return date
5 December 2016	DF	(Greece) Thanasis Repetsas	(red card) vs. Aris (MD 4)	1 match	18 December 2016
22 December 2016	DF	(Greece) Thanasis Repetsas	Insult against referee vs. Sparti (MD 6)	4 matches	18 January 2017
22 January 2017	MF	(Greece) Rafail Gioukaris	Four yellow cards	1 match	29 January 2017
22 February 2017	DF	(Greece) Spyros Apostolou	Four yellow cards	1 match	26 February 2017
12 March 2017	MF	(Greece) Dimitris Zouliotis	Four yellow cards	1 match	19 March 2017
19 March 2017	DF	(Egypt) Amir Azmy	(red card) vs. Lamia (MD 20)	1 match	26 March 2017
12 April 2017	MF	(Serbia) Milan Svojić	Four yellow cards	1 match	23 April 2017
7 May 2017	DF	(Greece) Thanasis Repetsas	Four yellow cards	1 match	12 May 2017
7 May 2017	MF	(Greece) Rafail Gioukaris	Four yellow cards	1 match	21 May 2017

Source: AEL Kalloni F.C.

==== Injuries ====
Players in bold are still out from their injuries.
Players listed will/have miss(ed) at least one competitive game (missing from whole matchday squad).

Date	Pos.	Name	Recovery time	Return date*
24 October 2016	MF	(Greece) Lazaros Tzelidis	14 days	6 November 2016
25 October 2016	FW	(Romania) Lucian Burdujan	12 days	6 November 2016
25 November 2016	DF	(Greece) Stelios Pozatzidis	5 days	1 December 2016
20 December 2016	DF	(Greece) Stelios Pozatzidis	approx. 10 days	4 January 2017
3 January 2017	FW	(Romania) Lucian Burdujan	–	–
3 January 2017	FW	(Greece) Aris Lambrakis	3 days	8 January 2017
14 January 2017	DF	(Greece) Spyros Apostolou	2 days	18 January 2017
17 January 2017	DF	(Greece) Stelios Pozatzidis	–	–
4 February 2017	MF	(Greece) Lazaros Tzelidis	1.5-month	19 March 2017
4 February 2017	FW	(Greece) Giorgos Dikaiopoulos	1.5-month	19 March 2017
22 February 2017	GK	(Greece) Kostas Maniatis	1.5-month	9 April 2017
4 March 2017	MF	(Greece) Giannis Giorgou	35 days	9 April 2017
1 April 2017	MF	(Greece) Dimitris Zouliotis	1 week	9 April 2017
1 April 2017	DF	(Greece) Spyros Apostolou	1 week	9 April 2017
9 April 2017	GK	(Greece) Panagiotis Papadopoulos	–	–

- 'Return date' is date that player returned to matchday squad.
  Source: Kalloni F.C.

=== Transfers ===
==== Summer ====
===== In =====
Date	Pos.	Name	From	Fee
24 July 2016	GK	(Greece) Dimitris Tairis	(Greece) Apollon Smyrni	Unknown
24 July 2016	DF	(Greece) Spyros Apostolou	(Greece) Zakynthos	Unknown
24 July 2016	DF	(Greece) Thanasis Repetsas	(Greece) Acharnaikos	Unknown
24 July 2016	MF	(Greece) Dimitris Zouliotis	(Greece) Lamia	Unknown
24 July 2016	FW	(Greece) Dimitris Litainas	(Greece) Tyrnavos 2005	Unknown
26 July 2016	FW	(Greece) Michalis Frangos	(Greece) Kallithea	Unknown
26 July 2016	FW	(Albania) (Greece) Florenc Keri	(Greece) Aiolikos	Free
6 August 2016	DF	(Greece) Panagiotis Arnaoutoglou	(Greece) Apollon Smyrni	Unknown
7 August 2016	FW	(Brazil) Anderson Paraíba	(Brazil) Salgueiro	Unknown
8 August 2016	MF	(Greece) Lazaros Tzelidis	Youth system	Free
19 August 2016	DF	(Cyprus) Giannis Savva	(Cyprus) Pafos FC	Unknown
19 August 2016	FW	(Romania) Lucian Burdujan	(Gibraltar) Europa	Unknown
23 August 2016	GK	(Greece) Kostas Maniatis	(Greece) Panelefsiniakos	Unknown
23 August 2016	MF	(Greece) Alexis Dallas	(Greece) Fostiras	Unknown
26 August 2016	MF	(Greece) Lambros Triantafyllou	Youth system	Free
26 August 2016	MF	(Greece) Giorgos Agrimakis	Youth system	Free
27 August 2016	MF	(Greece) Andreas Dambos	(Greece) Kanaris Nenita	Free
30 August 2016	DF	(Greece) Stelios Pozatzidis	(Greece) Panionios	Unknown
30 August 2016	GK	(Greece) Fotis Papazoglou	Youth system	Free
6 September 2016	MF	(Greece) Patroklos Krotsidas	Youth system	Free
9 September 2016	MF	(Serbia) Stefan Stefanović	(Montenegro) Sutjeska Nikšić	Free

===== Loaned in =====
Date	Pos.	Name	From	Duration
19 July 2016	DF	(Greece) Antonis Karageorgis	(Greece) Olympiacos	1 year

===== Out =====
Date	Pos.	Name	To	Fee
23 May 2016	MF	(Greece) Savvas Tsabouris	(Cyprus) Nea Salamis Famagusta	Free
27 May 2016	GK	(Greece) Kostas Dafkos	(Greece) OFI	Free
8 June 2016	FW	(Greece) Giorgos Manousos	(Greece) Platanias	Free
17 June 2016	GK	(Greece) Kiriakos Stratilatis	(Cyprus) Alki Oroklini	Unknown
30 June 2016	DF	(Greece) Vasilis Golias	(Greece) Trikala	Free
30 June 2016	DF	(Greece) Stratis Vallios	(Greece) Lamia	Free
30 June 2016	FW	(Greece) Dimitris Bourous	(Greece) Aiolikos	Free
30 June 2016	MF	(Greece) Aggelos Giazitzoglou	Unattached (Released)	
30 June 2016	FW	(Serbia) Miroslav Marković	(Czech Republic) Slovan Liberec	Free
30 June 2016	FW	(Spain) Braulio Nóbrega	(Spain) Caudal Deportivo	Free
6 July 2016	MF	(Greece) Fotis Georgiou	(Greece) PAE Kerkyra	Free
9 July 2016	DF	(Nigeria) Ugo Ukah	(Malaysia) Selangor	Free
19 July 2016	DF	(Greece) Antonis Karageorgis	(Greece) Olympiacos	Unknown
20 July 2016	DF	(Greece) Anestis Anastasiadis	(Greece) Lamia	Free
20 July 2016	DF	(Greece) Panagiotis Spyropoulos	(Greece) Lamia	Free
21 July 2015	DF	(Greece) Dimitris Oungialidis	(Greece) Agrotikos Asteras	Free
26 July 2016	MF	(Greece) Nikos Kaltsas	(Greece) Levadiakos	Unknown
28 July 2016	MF	(Serbia) Marko Blažić	(Greece) Lamia	Unknown
30 July 2016	MF	(Greece) (Sweden) Alexander Fioretos	(Denmark) Helsingør	Free
2 August 2016	DF	(Serbia) Nikola Mikić	(Greece) OFI	Unknown
18 August 2016	MF	(Kenya) Paul Were	(Greece) Acharnaikos	Unknown
19 August 2016	MF	(Greece) Michalis Chatzidimitriou	(Greece) Panserraikos	Unknown
7 September 2016	DF	(Spain) Raúl Llorente	(Greece) Platanias	Free

==== Winter ====
===== In =====
Date	Pos.	Name	From	Fee
31 January 2017	DF	(Egypt) Amir Azmy	Free agent	Free
31 January 2017	MF	(Serbia) Milan Svojić	(Serbia) Novi Pazar	Unknown
31 January 2017	FW	(Greece) Zisis Naoum	(Greece) Panelefsiniakos	Free
31 January 2017	FW	(Greece) Giorgos-Rafail Eleftheriadis	(Greece) Sparti	Free
31 January 2017	FW	(Greece) Giorgos Dikaiopoulos	Free agent	Free
31 January 2017	MF	(Greece) Giorgos Mexis	(Greece) Panelefsiniakos	Free
31 January 2017	MF	(Niger) (Mali) Mahamane Cissé	Free agent	Free
10 February 2017	GK	(Greece) Panagiotis Papadopoulos	(Greece) Trikala	Free

===== Out =====
Date	Pos.	Name	To	Fee
2 January 2017	DF	(Greece) Panagiotis Arnaoutoglou	(Greece) Panelefsiniakos	Free
2 January 2017	MF	(Greece) Alexis Dallas	(Greece) Proodeftiki	Free
2 January 2017	MF	(Greece) Andreas Dambos	(Greece) Aiolikos	Free
2 January 2017	FW	(Albania) (Greece) Florenc Keri	(Greece) Olympiacos Volou 1937	Free
5 January 2017	FW	(Romania) Lucian Burdujan	(Greece) Aiginiakos	Free
12 January 2017	FW	(Greece) Alexandros Chintaseli	(Greece) AO Kardia	Free
19 January 2017	GK	(Greece) Dimitris Tairis	(Greece) Apollon Smyrni	Free
19 January 2017	FW	(Brazil) Anderson Paraíba	(Brazil) EC Passo Fundo	Free
20 January 2017	DF	(Greece) Stelios Pozatzidis	(Greece) Lamia	Free
24 January 2017	FW	(Greece) Efthimis Gkamagkas	(Greece) PAE Kerkyra	Free
25 January 2017	MF	(Serbia) Stefan Stefanović	(Greece) Kallithea	Free
31 January 2017	FW	(Greece) Michalis Frangos	(Greece) Sparti	Free
8 May 2017	DF	(Greece) Spyros Apostolou	Unattached (Released)	
