= 2015–16 AEL Kalloni F.C. season =

AEL Kalloni
2015–16 season
- Owner: Nikos Michalakis
- Chairman: Nikos Michalakis
- Head coach: Nikos Karageorgiou
- Ground: Mytilene Municipal Stadium
- Super League Greece: 16th (relegated)
- Greek Cup: Round of 16
- Top goalscorer: League: Georgios Manousos (6); All: Georgios Manousos (7)
- Highest home attendance: (Super League Greece only); 2,159 (vs. Olmypiacos 19 December 2015)
- Lowest home attendance: (Super League Greece only); 256 (vs. Levadiakos 24 October 2015)
- Average home league attendance: (Super League Greece only); 921
Home colours	Away colours	Third colours

The 2015–16 season was AEL Kalloni's third season in the Super League Greece, the first tier of Greek football. They relegated to the Football League, while they reached the Round of 16 in the Greek Cup.

== Club ==
=== Coaching staff ===
Position	Staff
Head coach	(Greece) Nikos Karageorgiou
Assistant manager	(Greece) Giannis Ispirlidis
Goalkeepers' coach	(Greece) Panagiotis Nasis
Fitness trainer	(Turkey) Mert İsbilir
Club doctor	(Greece) Dimitris Varvagiannis
Physiotherapist	(Greece) Thanos Karavasilis

Last updated: 27 December 2015
Source: AEL Kalloni F.C.

=== Other information ===
Chairman	Nikos Michalakis
Ground (capacity and dimensions)	Mytilene Municipal Stadium (3,000 / 102×65 metres)

Last updated: 10 May 2015
Source: AEL Kalloni F.C.

== Pre-season friendlies ==
The basic stadium of the preparation took place from 19 to 31 July to Peio, Trentino, Italy.

Win Draw Loss Postponed

Date	Opponents	H / A	Result F – A	Scorers
18 July 2015	(Greece) Atromitos	A	1–3	Manousos 54'
21 July 2015	(Italy) GS Valpejo 1977	N	6–0	Xydas 14', Bourous (2) 27' (pen.), 65', Lambrakis (2) 53', 81', Tzelidis 60'
23 July 2015	(Italy) Sampdoria	N	0–3	
26 July 2015	(Italy) Palermo	N	0–2	
30 July 2015	(Italy) Vicenza	A	0–1	
5 September 2015	(Greece) Apollon Smyrni	H	1–0	Manousos 48' (pen.)

Last updated: 5 September 2015
Source: AEL Kalloni F.C.

== Competitions ==
=== Overall ===
Competition	Started round	Current position / round	Final position / round	First match	Last match
Super League Greece	—	—	16th	22 August 2015	17 April 2016
Greek Cup	Preliminary round	—	Round of 16	28 October 2015	14 January 2016

Last updated: 17 April 2016
Source: Competitions

=== Overview ===
Competition	Record							
Competition	G	W	D	L	GF	GA	GD	Win %
Super League Greece	30	3	7	20	19	53	−34	10.00
Greek Cup	5	3	0	2	6	10	−4	60.00
Total	35	6	7	22	25	63	−38	17.14

Updated to match played 17 April 2016
Source: Competitions

=== Super League Greece ===
==== League table ====
Pos	Team	Pld	W	D	L	GF	GA	GD	Pts	Qualification or relegation
12	Iraklis	30	8	11	11	24	32	−8	35 (Note: Head-to-head points: Panetolikos 4, Iraklis 1.)	
13	Skoda Xanthi	30	6	15	9	27	32	−5	33	
14	Veria	30	5	12	13	19	33	−14	27	
15	Panthrakikos (R)	30	3	8	19	18	58	−40	17	Relegation to the Football League
16	AEL Kalloni (R)	30	3	7	20	19	53	−34	16	Relegation to the Football League

Source: Superleague Greece, Soccerway
Rules for classification: 1) Points; 2) Head-to-head points; 3) Head-to-head goal difference; 4) Goals scored; 5) Goals against; 6) Play-offs (neutral ground); 7) Draw.
(Note: Criteria 6 is only used if needed to decide champion, teams for relegation or teams for UEFA competitions).
(R) Relegated

==== Results summary ====
Overall								Home						Away					
Pld	W	D	L	GF	GA	GD	Pts	W	D	L	GF	GA	GD	W	D	L	GF	GA	GD
30	3	7	20	19	53	−34	16	3	5	7	16	21	−5	0	2	13	3	32	−29

Last updated: 17 April 2016.
Source: Superleague Greece

==== Results by matchday ====
Round	1	2	3	4	5	6	7	8	9	10	11	12	13	14	15	16	17	18	19	20	21	22	23	24	25	26	27	28	29	30
Ground	H	A	H	A	H	H	A	H	A	H	A	H	A	A	H	A	H	A	H	A	A	H	A	H	A	H	A	H	H	A
Result	L	L	D	D	W	L	L	D	L	D	L	L	L	L	L	L	L	L	W	L	L	D	L	W	D	L	L	D	L	L
Position	12	16	14	14	13	14	15	15	15	15	15	15	15	16	16	16	16	16	16	16	16	16	16	15	16	16	16	16	16	16

Source: Superleague Greece
A = Away; H = Home; W = Win; D = Draw; L = Loss; = Relegation to 2016–17 Football League

==== Matches ====
The fixtures were announced on 14 July 2015.

Win Draw Loss Postponed

22 August 2015 1	AEL Kalloni	0–1	Iraklis	Mytilene
19:15 (UTC+3)	Marković (yellow card) 40'; Keita (yellow card) 47'	Report	7' Perrone; (yellow card) 39' Lazăr; (yellow card) 68' Romano	Stadium: Mytilene Municipal Stadium; Attendance: 1,151; Referee: Dimitrios Styliaras (Aetolia-Acarnania)

30 August 2015 2	Panathinaikos	4–0	AEL Kalloni	Athens
19:15 (UTC+3)	Karelis 8'; Berg 31'; Lagos (yellow card) 43'; Tavlaridis 57'; Petrić 80'; Zeca (yellow card) 90+4'	Report	(yellow card) 14' Kaltsas; (yellow card) 43' Ellacopulos; (yellow card) 81' Tsabouris	Stadium: Leoforos Alexandras Stadium; Attendance: 7,968; Referee: Spyridon Selimos (Laconia)

12 September 2015 3	AEL Kalloni	1–1	Asteras Tripoli	Mytilene
16:00 (UTC+3)	Keita (yellow card) 45' (yellow-red card) 78'; Ukah (yellow card) 73' (yellow-red card) 83'; Król (yellow card) 88'; Anastasiadis 90+5'	Report	(yellow card) 33' Goian; (yellow card) 53' Giannoulis; 84' (pen.), (yellow card) 88' Giannou	Stadium: Mytilene Municipal Stadium; Attendance: 788; Referee: Aristidis Vatsios (West Attica)

23 September 2015 4	Panthrakikos	0–0	AEL Kalloni	Komotini
18:15 (UTC+3)	Baykara (yellow card) 53'; Melissis (yellow card) 73'; Martins (yellow card) 76'	Report	(yellow card) 18' Bargan; (yellow card) 80' Kladrubský; (yellow card) 87' Hogg	Stadium: Komotini Municipal Stadium; Attendance: 993; Referee: Ananias Fotiadis (Serres)

26 September 2015 5	AEL Kalloni	5–1	Panetolikos	Mytilene
16:00 (UTC+3)	Ellacopulos 10'; Georgiou 22', 27', (yellow card) 27'; Adejo 34'; Manousos 62', (yellow card) 62'; Król (yellow card) 79'	Report	(yellow card) 48' Bejarano; 83' Paulo	Stadium: Mytilene Municipal Stadium; Attendance: 591; Referee: Ilias Spathas (Piraeus)

4 October 2015 6	AEL Kalloni	0–1	Veria	Mytilene
18:15 (UTC+3)	Kaltsas (yellow card) 12'; Ukah (yellow card) 73'; Bargan (yellow card) 90+3'	Report	(yellow card) 40' Marangos; 90+4' (pen.) Abdoun	Stadium: Mytilene Municipal Stadium; Attendance: 926; Referee: Evangelos Kiotzenis (Xanthi)

17 October 2015 7	Panionios	2–0	AEL Kalloni	Nea Smyrni
18:15 (UTC+3)	Bakasetas 11', 68'; Boumale (yellow card) 87'	Report	(yellow card) 32' Król; (yellow card) 60' Keita	Stadium: Nea Smyrni Stadium; Attendance: 898; Referee: Andreas Pappas (Athens)

24 October 2015 8	AEL Kalloni	0–0	Levadiakos	Mytilene
15:00 (UTC+3)	Bargan (yellow card) 7'; Kaltsas (yellow card) 38'; Saba (yellow card) 45'; Llorente (yellow card) 80'; Anastasiadis (yellow card) 90+2'	Report	(yellow card) 24' Tripotseris; (yellow card) 69' Nicolaou; (yellow card) 87' Machairas; (yellow card) 89' Romeu; (yellow card) 90' Navarro	Stadium: Mytilene Municipal Stadium; Attendance: 256; Referee: Ioannis Papadopoulos (Macedonia)

31 October 2015 9	Platanias	2–1	AEL Kalloni	Mournies
17:15 (UTC+2)	Angulo 17'; Vanderson (yellow card) 39'; Banana (yellow card) 47'; Giakoumakis 84'; Munafo (yellow card) 90+2'; Itoua (yellow card) 90+3'	Report	5' Bargan; (yellow card) 69' Manousos; (red card) 80' Hogg; (yellow card) 82' Dafkos	Stadium: Perivolia Municipal Stadium; Attendance: 1,453; Referee: Ilias Spathas (Piraeus)

7 November 2015 10	AEL Kalloni	2–2	Skoda Xanthi	Mytilene
17:15 (UTC+2)	Kladrubský (yellow card) 30'; Manousos 38', 90+4' (pen.), (yellow card) 55'; Ukah (yellow card) 44'; Keita (yellow card) 45+1'; Tsabouris (yellow card) 75'; Saba (yellow card) 84'	Report	6' Soltani; (yellow card) 18' Zaradoukas; (yellow card) 32' Farkaš; (yellow card) 44' Bertos; (yellow card) 55' Cennamo; (yellow card) 57' Papasterianos; (yellow card) 65' Baxevanidis; (yellow card) 81' Fliskas; 85' Herea	Stadium: Mytilene Municipal Stadium; Attendance: 625; Referee: Alexandros Aretopoulos (Trikala)

21 November 2015 11	PAS Giannina	2–1	AEL Kalloni	Ioannina
17:15 (UTC+2)	Manias 7', 79'; Nadales (yellow card) 29'; Michail (yellow card) 40'; Tzimopoulos (yellow card) 55'; Karanikas (yellow card) 80'	Report	(yellow card) 13' Keita; (yellow card) 26' (goal) 64' Bargan; (yellow card) 57' (yellow-red card) 83' Ukah; (yellow card) 80' Manousos	Stadium: Zosimades Stadium; Attendance: 1,370; Referee: Dimitrios Karantonis (Imathia)

30 November 2015 12	AEL Kalloni	1–3	PAOK	Mytilene
19:30 (UTC+2)	Manousos 41' (pen.); Keita (yellow card) 85' (yellow-red card) 90+3'; Tsabouris (yellow card) 90+1'	Report	7', 76', (yellow card) 26' Athanasiadis; (yellow card) 22' Leovac; (yellow card) 40' Skondras; (yellow card) 68' Golasa; 90' Mystakidis; (yellow card) 90+3' Konstantinidis; (yellow card) 90+3' Kaçe	Stadium: Mytilene Municipal Stadium; Attendance: 1,066; Referee: Ioannis Delfakis (Arcadia)

6 December 2015 13	AEK Athens	3–0	AEL Kalloni	Athens
17:15 (UTC+2)	Djebbour 5'; Aravidis 19', 62'; Johansson (yellow card) 38'	Report		Stadium: Athens Olympic Stadium "Spyridon Louis"; Attendance: 6,471; Referee: Athanasios Tzilos (Larissa)

13 December 2015 14	Atromitos	1–0	AEL Kalloni	Peristeri
17:15 (UTC+2)	Usero (yellow card) 74' (goal) 90+4'; Bíttolo (yellow card) 90+1'; Pitu (yellow card) 90+6'	Report	(yellow card) 53' (yellow-red card) 90+7' Keita; (yellow card) 67' Manousos; (yellow card) 75' (yellow-red card) 76' Ellacopulos; (yellow card) 78' Georgiou; (yellow card) 90+1' Tsabouris	Stadium: Peristeri Stadium; Attendance: 574; Referee: Ananias Fotiadis (Serres)

19 December 2015 15	AEL Kalloni	0–2	Olympiacos	Mytilene
19:30 (UTC+2)	Dafkos (red card) 33'; Król (yellow card) 60'	Report	9' (pen.), 38' (pen.) Fortounis; (yellow card) 30' Milivojević	Stadium: Mytilene Municipal Stadium; Attendance: 2,159; Referee: Stavros Mantalos (Kavala)

2 January 2016 16	Iraklis	3–0	AEL Kalloni	Thessaloniki
19:30 (UTC+2)	Vellios 15', 43' (pen.), 70'; Pourtoulidis (yellow card) 64'	Report	(yellow card) 18' Kaltsas; (yellow card) 30' Król	Stadium: Kaftanzoglio Stadium; Attendance: 1,276; Referee: Alexandros Aretopoulos (Trikala)

11 January 2016 17	AEL Kalloni	0–2	Panathinaikos	Mytilene
19:30 (UTC+2)	Tsabouris (yellow card) 42'	Report	47' Kaltsas; (yellow card) 65' Pranjić; 90' Boumale	Stadium: Mytilene Municipal Stadium; Attendance: 1,766; Referee: Athanasios Giachos (Chios)

17 January 2016 18	Asteras Tripoli	3–1	AEL Kalloni	Tripoli
17:15 (UTC+2)	Zisopoulos (yellow card) 41' (yellow-red card) 90+1'; Iglesias 52', 61'; Panteliadis (yellow card) 54'; Giannou 57'; Goian (yellow card) 59'	Report	41' (pen.) Manousos; (yellow card) 43' (yellow-red card) 63' Ellacopulos	Stadium: Theodoros Kolokotronis Stadium; Attendance: 961; Referee: Charalambos Kalogeropoulos (Athens)

23 January 2016 19	AEL Kalloni	2–0	Panthrakikos	Mytilene
15:00 (UTC+2)	Favalli 53'; Anastasiadis 85'	Report	(yellow card) 55' Petavrakis; (yellow card) 75' Potouridis	Stadium: Mytilene Municipal Stadium; Attendance: 364; Referee: Andreas Pappas (Athens)

30 January 2016 20	Panetolikos	1–0	AEL Kalloni	Agrinio
15:00 (UTC+2)	Kappel 17'; M. Paulo (yellow card) 28'; Vasiloudis (yellow card) 89'	Report	(yellow card) 19' Mikić; (yellow card) 28' Anastasiadis; (yellow card) 41' Ellacopulos; (yellow card) 49' Tsabouris; (yellow card) 61' Vallios	Stadium: Panetolikos Stadium; Attendance: 2,075; Referee: Anastasios Sidiropoulos (Dodecanese)

7 February 2016 21	Veria	2–0	AEL Kalloni	Veria
17:15 (UTC+2)	Poungouras (yellow card) 12'; Majewski 15'; Nazlidis (penalty missed) 33'; Siontis (yellow card) 40'; Kajkut (yellow card) 82'; Anakoglou 87'	Report	(yellow card) 32' Anastasiadis; (yellow card) 90+2' Ellacopulos	Stadium: Veria Stadium; Attendance: 714; Referee: Georgios Kyzas (Drama)

14 February 2016 22	AEL Kalloni	1–1	Panionios	Mytilene
17:15 (UTC+2)	Manousos (yellow card) 31'; Anastasiadis 45'	Report	(yellow card) 10' Ikonomou; (yellow card) 24' Katharios; 29' Ansarifard; (yellow card) 59' Bargan; (yellow card) 90+4' Korbos	Stadium: Mytilene Municipal Stadium; Attendance: 459; Referee: Michael Voskakis (Rethymno)

20 February 2016 23	Levadiakos	1–0	AEL Kalloni	Livadeia
15:00 (UTC+2)	Tsurikov (yellow card) 18'; Mantzios 72' (pen.); Mendy (yellow card) 75'; Ajagun (yellow card) 83'; Kapsaskis (yellow card) 87'	Report	(yellow card) 16' Blažić; (yellow card) 27' Kaltsas; (yellow card) 31' Favalli; (yellow card) 68' Anastasiadis; (yellow card) 86' Ellacopulos	Stadium: Levadia Municipal Stadium; Attendance: 621; Referee: Spyridon Selimos (Laconia)

27 February 2016 24	AEL Kalloni	2–1	Platanias	Mytilene
15:00 (UTC+2)	Marković 20'; Anastasiadis (yellow card) 34'; Favalli (yellow card) 41'; Ellacopulos 56'; Mikić (yellow card) 90+2'; Nóbrega (yellow card) 90+4'	Report	(yellow card) 26' Dinas; (yellow card) 55' Gnjatić; 71' Angulo	Stadium: Mytilene Municipal Stadium; Attendance: 412; Referee: Angelos Evangelou (Athens)

6 March 2016 25	Skoda Xanthi	0–0	AEL Kalloni	Xanthi
17:15 (UTC+2)	Vasilakakis (yellow card) 39'; Wallace (yellow card) 82'	Report	(yellow card) 33' Kaltsas; (yellow card) 47' Tsabouris; (yellow card) 62' Blažić	Stadium: Skoda Xanthi Arena; Attendance: 854; Referee: Athanasios Giachos (Chios)

12 March 2016 26	AEL Kalloni	0–2	PAS Giannina	Mytilene
17:15 (UTC+2)		Report	(yellow card) 25' (goal) 90' Manias; 43' Tzimopoulos; (yellow card) 54' Skondras; (yellow card) 57' Nadales; (yellow card) 88' Peristeridis	Stadium: Mytilene Municipal Stadium; Attendance: 534; Referee: Ananias Fotiadis (Serres)

20 March 2016 27	PAOK	3–0	AEL Kalloni	Thessaloniki
17:15 (UTC+2)	Mystakidis 28'; Charisis (yellow card) 46'; Athanasiadis 58'; Korovesis 76'	Report		Stadium: Toumba Stadium; Attendance: 7,725; Referee: Dimitrios Karantonis (Imathia)

3 April 2016 28	AEL Kalloni	0–0	AEK Athens	Mytilene
19:00 (UTC+3)	Favalli (yellow card) 60'; Kaltsas (yellow card) 76'	Report	(yellow card) 88' Simões; (yellow card) 90+3' Arzo	Stadium: Mytilene Municipal Stadium; Attendance: 2,062; Referee: Dimitrios Thanos (Grevena)

10 April 2016 29	AEL Kalloni	2–4	Atromitos	Mytilene
19:00 (UTC+3)	Ukah (yellow card) 39'; Manousos 52' (pen.); Anastasiadis 57'	Report	5' Matei; 6' Usero; (yellow card) 51' Keita; 60' Brito; (yellow card) 67' Chumbinho; 77' Le Tallec; (yellow card) 86' (yellow-red card) 90+2' Fytanidis	Stadium: Mytilene Municipal Stadium; Attendance: 652; Referee: Ioannis Papadopoulos (Macedonia)

17 April 2016 30	Olympiacos	5–0	AEL Kalloni	Piraeus
19:00 (UTC+3)	Fortounis 21'; Fuster 35' (yellow card) 53'; Kasami 61'; Elabdellaoui 77'; Ideye 84'	Report	(yellow card) 20' Anastasiadis; (yellow card) 37' Llorente	Stadium: Georgios Karaiskakis Stadium; Referee: Ananias Fotiadis (Serres)

Last updated: 17 April 2016
Source: Superleague Greece

=== Greek Cup ===
==== Second round ====
Group H

Pos	Team	Pld	W	D	L	GF	GA	GD	Pts	Qualification
1	Asteras Tripolis	3	3	0	0	8	1	+7	9	Round of 16
2	Kalloni	3	2	0	1	4	6	−2	6	Round of 16
3	Kissamikos	3	0	1	2	2	5	−3	1	
4	Panserraikos	3	0	1	2	1	3	−2	1	

Source: epo.gr
Rules for classification: 1. Points 2. Head-to-head points 3. Goals scored 4. Goals against 5. Play-offs (neutral ground).

Win Draw Loss Postponed

28 October 2015 1	Asteras Tripoli	4–0	AEL Kalloni	Tripoli
19:30 (UTC+2)	Lanzarote 21'; Shkurtaj 49', 72' (pen.); Fernández 87'	Report	Xydas (yellow card) 62'; Oungialidis (yellow card) 71'; Dafkos (yellow card) 87'	Stadium: Theodoros Kolokotronis Stadium; Attendance: n/a Referee: Marios Lambropoulos (Elis)

3 December 2015 2	AEL Kalloni	2–1	Panserraikos	Mytilene
15:00 (UTC+2)	Tsabouris (yellow card) 22'; Ellacopulos (yellow card) 28'; Anastasiadis (yellow card) 40'; Bargan 55'; Kladrubský (yellow card) 58'; Georgiou 85'	Report	15' Popovic; (yellow card) 47' Tsimikas; (yellow card) 82' Koukolis; (yellow card) 87' Kapsalis; (yellow card) 90+3' Qose	Stadium: Mytilene Municipal Stadium; Attendance: n/a Referee: Christos Gkranas (Thrace)

16 December 2015 3	Kissamikos	1–2	AEL Kalloni	Maleme
15:00 (UTC+2)	Posinkovic 35'; Tsikoudakis (yellow card) 90+1'	Report	(yellow card) 14' (goal) 90+2' (pen.) Manousos; 66' Marković; (yellow card) 75' Kaltsas	Stadium: Maleme Stadium; Attendance: n/a Referee: Michael Koukoulakis (Heraklion)

==== Round of 16 ====
6 January 2016 First leg	AEL Kalloni	2–1	PAOK	Mytilene
19:30 (UTC+2)	Anastasiadis 3'; Kaltsas (yellow card) 24'; Georgiou 79'	Report	(yellow card) 56' Charisis; 89' Mak	Stadium: Mytilene Municipal Stadium; Attendance: n/a Referee: Dimitrios Karantonis (Imathia)

14 January 2016 Second leg	PAOK	3–0	AEL Kalloni	Thessaloniki
17:15 (UTC+2)	Mak (yellow card) 22' (goal) 65'; Athanasiadis 58'; Berbatov 86'	Report	Mikić (yellow card) 10'	Stadium: Toumba Stadium; Attendance: n/a Referee: Georgios Kominis (Thesprotia)

PAOK won 4–2 on aggregate.

Last updated: 14 January 2016
Source: HFF

== Players ==
=== Squad statistics ===
==== Appearances and goals ====
Key

**No.** = Squad number

**Pos.** = Playing position

**Apps** = Appearances

**GK** = Goalkeeper

**DF** = Defender

**MF** = Midfielder

**FW** = Forward

Numbers in parentheses denote appearances as substitute. Players with number struck through and marked † left the club during the playing season.

As of 17 April 2016

No.	Pos.	Name	Super League Greece		Greek Cup		Total	
No.	Pos.	Name	Apps	Goals	Apps	Goals	Apps	Goals
1	GK	(Greece) Kostas Dafkos	16 (1)	0	4	0	20 (1)	0
3	DF	(Greece) Vasilis Golias	12	0	0	0	12	0
5	MF	(Sweden) Alexander Fioretos	0 (1)	0	0	0	0 (1)	0
6	DF	(Greece) Panagiotis Spyropoulos	6 (5)	0	3 (1)	0	9 (6)	0
7	FW	(Greece) Dimitris Bourous	0 (6)	0	1 (1)	0	1 (7)	0
9	FW	(Greece) Giorgos Manousos (c)	29	6	3	1	32	7
10	FW	(Serbia) Miroslav Marković	11 (3)	1	3	0	14 (3)	1
11	MF	(Greece) Fotis Georgiou	25 (3)	2	3	2	28 (3)	4
12	FW	(Greece) Aris Lambrakis	0	0	0	0	0	0
13	DF	(Greece) Dimitris Oungialidis	0	0	0 (2)	0	0 (2)	0
14	DF	(Greece) Anestis Anastasiadis (c)	27	4	3	1	30	5
16	DF	(Greece) Kyriakos Evaggelidakis	0 (3)	0	2	0	2 (3)	0
18	MF	(Argentina) Emiliano Ellacopulos	9 (6)	2	3	0	12 (6)	2
19	DF	(Nigeria) Ugo Ukah	16 (4)	0	2	0	18 (4)	0
20	DF	(Greece) Antonis Karageorgis	0	0	0 (1)	0	0 (1)	0
21	MF	(Greece) Michalis Chatzidimitriou	0 (3)	0	3	0	3 (3)	0
22	MF	(Greece) Giannis Giorgou	0	0	0	0	0	0
25	MF	(Argentina) Lucas Favalli	8	1	0	0	8	1
26	MF	(Greece) Rafail Gioukaris	3 (4)	0	3 (1)	0	6 (5)	0
27	MF	(Greece) Nikos Kaltsas (c)	25 (1)	0	3 (1)	0	28 (2)	0
28	FW	(Greece) Giorgos Xydas	3 (4)	0	2	0	5 (4)	0
29	MF	(Kenya) Paul Were	7 (3)	0	1 (1)	0	8 (4)	0
30	FW	(Greece) Efthimis Gkamagkas	0 (2)	0	0	0	0 (2)	0
31	MF	(Greece) Savvas Tsabouris	25	0	3 (1)	0	28 (1)	0
32	MF	(Serbia) Marko Blažić	9	0	0	0	9	0
33	DF	(Serbia) Nikola Mikić	11	0	1	0	12	0
40	GK	(Greece) Nikos Mallis	0 (1)	0	0	0	0 (1)	0
55	DF	(Greece) Stratis Vallios	8 (1)	0	3	0	11 (1)	0
69	DF	(Spain) Raúl Llorente	9 (5)	0	0	0	9 (5)	0
85	FW	(Spain) Braulio Nóbrega	0 (5)	0	0	0	0 (5)	0
86	GK	(Greece) Kiriakos Stratilatis	0	0	0	0	0	0
90	FW	(Greece) Alexandros Chintaseli	1 (1)	0	1 (2)	0	2 (3)	0
96	FW	(Greece) Giorgos Sofianis	0	0	0	0	0	0
—	GK	(Serbia) Branimir Aleksić †	0	0	0	0	0	0
—	GK	(Malta) Andrew Hogg †	14	0	1	0	15	0
—	DF	(Nigeria) Daniel Adejo †	9 (2)	1	1	0	10 (2)	1
—	DF	(Poland) Krzysztof Król †	10 (1)	0	2	0	12 (1)	0
—	DF	(Greece) Christos Pipinis †	0	0	0	0	0	0
—	MF	(Greece) Kenan Bargan†	7 (6)	2	2 (2)	1	9 (8)	3
—	MF	(Senegal) Paul Keita †	13	0	0 (1)	0	13 (1)	0
—	MF	(Czech Republic) Jiří Kladrubský †	4 (5)	0	1 (1)	0	5 (6)	0
—	MF	(Brazil) Vítor Saba †	10 (2)	0	0	0	10 (2)	0
—	FW	(Sweden) Sonny Karlsson †	2 (6)	0	1	0	3 (6)	0
—	–	Own goals	–	0	–	0	–	0

Source: Superleague Greece

==== Top scorers ====
As of 17 April 2016

Place	Position	Nationality	Number	Name	Super League	Greek Cup	Total
1	FW	(Greece)	9	Giorgos Manousos	6	1	7
2	DF	(Greece)	14	Anestis Anastasiadis	4	1	5
3	MF	(Greece)	11	Fotis Georgiou	2	2	4
4	FW	(Greece)	99	Kenan Bargan †	2	1	3
5	FW	(Serbia)	10	Miroslav Marković	1	1	2
5	MF	(Argentina)	18	Emiliano Ellacopulos	2	0	2
6	DF	(Nigeria)	4	Daniel Adejo †	1	0	1
6	MF	(Argentina)	25	Lucas Favalli	1	0	1
**TOTALS**					**19**	**6**	25

Source: Superleague Greece

==== Disciplinary record ====
As of 17 April 2016

**Number**	**Nationality**	**Position**	**Name**	**Super League**		**Greek Cup**		Total	
**Number**	**Nationality**	**Position**	**Name**	Booked	Sent off (straight red)	Booked	Sent off (straight red)	Booked	Sent off (straight red)
24	(Senegal)	MF	Paul Keita †	4	3*	0	0	4	3
18	(Argentina)	MF	Emiliano Ellacopulos	4	2*	1	0	5	2
19	(Nigeria)	DF	Ugo Ukah	3	2*	0	0	3	2
1	(Greece)	GK	Kostas Dafkos	1	1	1	0	2	1
17	(Malta)	GK	Andrew Hogg †	1	1	0	0	1	1
27	(Greece)	MF	Nikos Kaltsas	7	0	2	0	9	0
31	(Greece)	MF	Savvas Tsabouris	7	0	1	0	8	0
9	(Greece)	FW	Giorgos Manousos	6	0	1	0	7	0
14	(Greece)	DF	Anestis Anastasiadis	6	0	1	0	7	0
23	(Poland)	DF	Krzysztof Król †	4	0	0	0	4	0
99	(Greece)	MF	Kenan Bargan †	4	0	0	0	4	0
25	(Argentina)	MF	Lucas Favalli	3	0	0	0	3	0
33	(Czech Republic)	MF	Jiří Kladrubský †	2	0	1	0	3	0
33	(Serbia)	DF	Nikola Mikić	2	0	1	0	3	0
2	(Brazil)	MF	Vítor Saba †	2	0	0	0	2	0
11	(Greece)	MF	Fotis Georgiou	2	0	0	0	2	0
32	(Serbia)	MF	Marko Blažić	2	0	0	0	2	0
69	(Spain)	DF	Raúl Llorente	2	0	0	0	2	0
10	(Serbia)	FW	Miroslav Marković	1	0	0	0	1	0
13	(Greece)	DF	Dimitris Oungialidis	0	0	1	0	1	0
28	(Greece)	FW	Giorgos Xydas	0	0	1	0	1	0
55	(Greece)	DF	Stratis Vallios	1	0	0	0	1	0
85	(Spain)	FW	Braulio Nóbrega	1	0	0	0	1	0
			**TOTALS**	**65**	**9**	**11**	**0**	76	9

Last updated: 17 April 2016
Competitive matches only
* indicates a second yellow card ( (yellow card) (yellow-red card) )
Source: Superleague Greece

==== Suspended players ====
Date	Pos.	Name	Reason	Return date
12 September 2015	MF	(Senegal) Paul Keita	(red card) vs. Asteras Tripoli (MD 3)	26 September 2015
12 September 2015	DF	(Nigeria) Ugo Ukah	(red card) vs. Asteras Tripoli (MD 3)	26 September 2015
31 October 2015	GK	(Malta) Andrew Hogg	(red card) vs. Platanias (MD 9)	21 November 2015
21 November 2015	DF	(Nigeria) Ugo Ukah	(red card) vs. PAS Giannina (MD 11)	6 December 2015
30 November 2015	MF	(Senegal) Paul Keita	(red card) vs. PAOK (MD 12)	6 December 2015
13 December 2015	MF	(Argentina) Emiliano Ellacopulos	(red card) vs. Atromitos (MD 14)	19 December 2015
13 December 2015	MF	(Senegal) Paul Keita	(red card) vs. Atromitos (MD 14)	2 January 2016
13 December 2015	MF	(Senegal) Paul Keita	Booked	2 January 2016
13 December 2015	FW	(Greece) Giorgos Manousos	Booked	2 January 2016
13 December 2015	MF	(Greece) Savvas Tsabouris	Booked	2 January 2016
19 December 2015	GK	(Greece) Kostas Dafkos	(red card) vs. Olympiacos (MD 15)	14 January 2016
11 January 2016	MF	(Senegal) Paul Keita	Booked	—
17 January 2016	MF	(Argentina) Emiliano Ellacopulos	(red card) vs. Asteras Tripoli (MD 18)	30 January 2016
30 January 2016	MF	(Greece) Nikos Kaltsas	Booked	7 February 2016
6 March 2016	MF	(Argentina) Emiliano Ellacopulos	Booked	—
6 March 2016	MF	(Argentina) Lucas Favalli	Booked	12 March 2016
20 March 2016	MF	(Greece) Anestis Anastasiadis	Booked	3 April 2016
3 April 2016	MF	(Greece) Savvas Tsabouris	Booked	—
10 April 2016	MF	(Greece) Nikos Kaltsas	Booked	—

Source: AEL Kalloni F.C.

==== Injuries ====
Players in bold are still out from their injuries.
Players listed will/have miss(ed) at least one competitive game (missing from whole matchday squad).

Date	Pos.	Name	Recovery time	Return date*
29 August 2015	MF	Jiří Kladrubský	n/a	12 September 2015
10 September 2015	FW	Miroslav Marković	2.5 months	30 November 2015
20 September 2015	DF	Stratis Vallios	35 days	24 October 2015
27 September 2015	MF	Emiliano Ellacopulos	20 days	17 October 2015
23 October 2015	MF	Emiliano Ellacopulos	40 days	3 December 2015
23 October 2015	MF	Rafail Gioukaris	4 days	28 October 2015
5 November 2015	MF	Rafail Gioukaris	10 days	3 December 2015
5 November 2015	MF	Paul Were	1 week	19 December 2015
21 November 2015	MF	Savvas Tsabouris	2 days	30 November 2015
25 November 2015	MF	Paul Were	1 week	19 December 2015
29 November 2015	GK	Andrew Hogg	1 week	6 December 2015
5 December 2015	DF	Anestis Anastasiadis	2 days	13 December 2015
8 December 2015	DF	Stratis Vallios	10 days	6 January 2016
12 December 2015	GK	Kostas Dafkos	3 days	16 December 2015
13 December 2015	DF	Raúl Llorente	1.5 month	3 February 2016
16 December 2015	FW	Kenan Bargan	15 days	2 January 2016
14 January 2016	DF	Nikola Mikić	1 week	23 January 2016
2 February 2016	GK	Andrew Hogg	5 days	—
2 February 2016	DF	Panagiotis Spyropoulos	n/a	14 February 2016
3 February 2016	DF	Stratis Vallios	1 week	10 February 2016
12 February 2016	MF	Marko Blažić	3 days	15 February 2016
13 February 2016	GK	Kiriakos Stratilatis	25 days	—
15 February 2016	DF	Stratis Vallios	2.5 months	3 April 2016
24 February 2016	MF	Nikos Kaltsas	1 week	6 March 2016
25 February 2016	FW	Alexandros Chintaseli	n/a	—
25 February 2016	MF	Rafail Gioukaris	4 days	20 March 2016
26 February 2016	FW	Dimitris Bourous	25 days	—
1 March 2016	DF	Panagiotis Spyropoulos	1 week	20 March 2016
4 March 2016	MF	Emiliano Ellacopulos	n/a	—
4 March 2016	FW	Braulio Nóbrega	n/a	—
4 March 2016	MF	Rafail Gioukaris	5 days	20 March 2016
11 March 2016	FW	Giorgos Xydas	8 days	20 March 2016
7 April 2016	FW	Sonny Karlsson	5 days	—
10 April 2016	MF	Lucas Favalli	n/a	—
12 April 2016	DF	Stratis Vallios	n/a	—
12 April 2016	MF	Fotis Georgiou	n/a	—
12 April 2016	MF	Savvas Tsabouris	n/a	—

- 'Return date' is date that player returned to matchday squad.
  Source: Kalloni F.C.

=== Transfers ===
==== Summer ====
===== In =====
Date	Pos.	Name	From	Fee
24 June 2015	DF	(Poland) Krzysztof Król	(Canada) Montreal Impact	Unknown
25 June 2015	MF	(Czech Republic) Jiří Kladrubský	(Czech Republic) Dynamo České Budějovice	Unknown
26 June 2015	FW	(Serbia) Miroslav Marković	(Czech Republic) Zbrojovka Brno	Unknown
29 June 2015	DF	(Greece) Dimitris Oungialidis	(Greece) Zakynthos	Unknown
30 June 2015	MF	(Greece) Michalis Chatzidimitriou	(Greece) Serres F.C.	Unknown
2 July 2015	DF	(Nigeria) Ugo Ukah	(Serbia) Čukarički	Unknown
20 July 2015	MF	(Greece) Fotis Georgiou	(Greece) Atromitos	Free
23 July 2015	MF	(Greece) Giorgos Agrimakis	Youth system	–
4 August 2015	MF	(Brazil) Vítor Saba	(Italy) Crotone	Unknown
20 August 2015	FW	(Greece) Alexandros Chintaseli	(Greece) Aris	Unknown
20 August 2015	MF	(Kenya) Paul Were	(South Africa) AmaZulu	Unknown
20 August 2015	FW	(Greece) Aris Lambrakis	Youth system	–
2 September 2015	MF	(Greece) Kenan Bargan	(Greece) Veria	Free
10 September 2015	DF	(Greece) Panagiotis Spyropoulos	(Greece) Panathinaikos	Free

===== Loaned in =====
Date	Pos.	Name	From	Duration
26 July 2015	MF	(Argentina) Emiliano Ellacopulos	(Argentina) Tigre	Ended

===== Out =====
Date	Pos.	Name	To	Fee
11 May 2015	MF	(Greece) Giorgos Chorianopoulos	Retired	
12 May 2015	FW	(Greece) Antonis Petropoulos	(Italy) Bari	Free
22 May 2015	MF	(Algeria) Salim Arrache	Unattached (Released)	
25 May 2015	MF	(Serbia) Ljubomir Stevanović	(Greece) Panelefsiniakos	Free
25 June 2015	FW	(Spain) Juanma	(Scotland) Hearts	Unknown
30 June 2015	MF	(Spain) Jordi Vidal Martín Rojas	(Spain) Leioa	Free
30 June 2015	MF	(Brazil) Marcelo Goianira	Unattached (Released)	
30 June 2015	MF	(Spain) Ximo Navarro	(Greece) Levadiakos	Free
30 June 2015	MF	(Greece) Dimitris Vlastellis	Retired	
30 June 2015	FW	(Greece) Anestis Agritis	Retired	
10 July 2015	MF	(Greece) Christos Mingas	(Greece) Levadiakos	Free
24 July 2015	MF	(Greece) Michalis Kripintiris	(Greece) Aiolikos	Unknown
27 July 2015	MF	(Brazil) Leozinho	(Turkey) Denizlispor	Unknown

===== Loaned out =====
Date	Pos.	Name	To	Duration
6 August 2015	MF	(Greece) Giorgos Agrimakis	(Greece) Kanaris Nenita	Ended
6 August 2015	MF	(Greece) Patroklos Krotsidas	(Greece) Kanaris Nenita	Ended
6 August 2015	FW	(Greece) Efthimis Gkamagkas	(Greece) Kanaris Nenita	Ended

==== Winter ====
===== In =====
Date	Pos.	Name	From	Fee
4 January 2016	FW	(Spain) Braulio Nóbrega	(Spain) Recreativo	Unknown
4 January 2016	FW	(Sweden) Sonny Karlsson	(Sweden) Syrianska	Unknown
10 January 2016	DF	(Serbia) Nikola Mikić	(Serbia) OFK Beograd	Unknown
13 January 2016	DF	(Greece) Vasilis Golias	(Greece) Apollon Smyrni	Unknown
1 February 2016	MF	(Serbia) Marko Blažić	(Serbia) Radnički Niš	Unknown
11 February 2016	GK	(Greece) Kiriakos Stratilatis	(Greece) Olympiacos Volos	Free
12 February 2016	MF	(Sweden) Alexander Fioretos	(Sweden) Helsingborgs IF	Free
n/a	FW	(Greece) Giorgos Sofianis	Youth system	–

===== Out =====
Date	Pos.	Name	To	Fee
September 2015	DF	(Greece) Christos Pipinis	(Greece) Apollon Smyrni	Free
21 December 2015	DF	(Nigeria) Daniel Adejo	(Italy) Vicenza	Free
21 December 2015	MF	(Czech Republic) Jiří Kladrubský	(Italy) Pavia	Free
23 December 2015	MF	(Brazil) Vítor Saba	(Italy) Siena	Free
13 January 2016	MF	(Senegal) Paul Keita	(Greece) Atromitos	Free
21 January 2016	MF	(Greece) Kenan Bargan	(Greece) Panionios	Free
29 January 2016	FW	(Greece) Giorgos Xydas	(Greece) Olympiacos	Unknown
9 February 2016	GK	(Malta) Andrew Hogg	Unattached (Released)	
n/a	GK	(Serbia) Branimir Aleksić	Unattached (Released)	
n/a	DF	(Poland) Krzysztof Król	Unattached (Released)	
12 April 2016	FW	(Sweden) Sonny Karlsson	Unattached (Released)	

===== Loaned in =====
Date	Pos.	Name	From	Duration
22 January 2016	MF	(Argentina) Lucas Favalli	(Greece) Levadiakos	Ended
29 January 2016	FW	(Greece) Giorgos Xydas	(Greece) Olympiacos	Ended

== Infrastructure leagues ==
=== U20 ===
Win Draw Loss Postponed

Date	Opponents	H / A	Result F – A
30 August 2015	Iraklis	H	2–3
5 September 2015	Panathinaikos	A	0–1
12 September 2015	Asteras Tripoli	H	3–1
23 September 2015	Panthrakikos	A	0–0
27 September 2015	Panetolikos	H	0–0
3 October 2015	Veria	H	1–2
18 October 2015	Panionios	A	4–2
24 October 2015	Levadiakos	H	2–2
31 October 2015	Platanias	A	6–2
7 November 2015	Skoda Xanthi	H	1–4
21 November 2015	PAS Giannina	A	0–1
30 November 2015	PAOK	H	2–4
6 December 2015	AEK Athens	A	0–2
12 December 2015	Atromitos	A	0–3
19 December 2015	Olympiacos	H	0–5
9 January 2016	Panathinaikos	H	0–1
16 January 2016	Asteras Tripoli	A	3–1
30 January 2016	Panetolikos	A	1–4
7 February 2016	Veria	A	1–4
15 February 2016	Panionios	H	0–3
21 February 2016	Levadiakos	A	0–1
27 February 2016	Platanias	H	5–0
6 March 2016	Skoda Xanthi	A	1–2
20 March 2016	PAOK	A	1–5
2 April 2016	AEK Athens	H	1–1
9 April 2016	Atromitos	H	0–1
17 April 2016	Olympiacos	A	2–8
25 April 2016	PAS Giannina	H	2–2
7 May 2016	Iraklis	A	1–2
14 May 2016	Panthrakikos	H	2–0

Pos	Club	Pld	Pts
13	PAS Giannina	29	25
14	AEL Kalloni	30	23
15	Levadiakos	30	15

Pos = Position; Pld = Matches played; Pts = Points

=== U17 ===
First Group

Win Draw Loss Postponed

Date	Opponents	H / A	Result F – A
3 October 2015	Atromitos	H	0–2
11 October 2015	Panionios	A	0–5
18 October 2015	Levadiakos	H	1–2
25 October 2015	Olympiacos	A	1–2
31 October 2015	Panathinaikos	H	0–2
8 November 2015	Asteras Tripoli	A	0–2
21 November 2015	AEK Athens	H	0–5
5 December 2015	Atromitos	A	0–4
20 December 2015	Levadiakos	A	0–1
10 January 2016	AEK Athens	A	0–3
16 January 2016	Olympiacos	H	0–6
23 January 2016	Panathinaikos	A	0–2
30 January 2016	Asteras Tripoli	H	1–1
15 February 2016	Panionios	H	0–5
21 February 2016	AEK Athens	A	0–5
27 February 2016	Platanias	H	0–1
5 March 2016	Atromitos	H	0–7
13 March 2016	Panionios	A	2–4
19 March 2016	Levadiakos	H	6–1
26 March 2016	Platanias	A	1–2
6 April 2016	Olympiacos	A	1–3
10 April 2016	Panathinaikos	H	1–2
17 April 2016	Asteras Tripoli	A	0–5
—	Platanias	H	

Pos	Club	Pld	Pts
7	Platanias	23	23
8	Levadiakos	24	20
9	AEL Kalloni	23	4

Pos = Position; Pld = Matches played; Pts = Points
