= 2012–13 Panathinaikos F.C. season =

Panathinaikos
2012–13 season
- Chairman: Giannis Alafouzos
- Manager: Giannis Vonortas
- Ground: Olympic Stadium
- Super League Greece: 6th
- Greek Cup: Round of 16
- Champions League: Play-off round
- Europa League: Group stage
- Top goalscorer: League: Toché (9); All: Toché (12)
- Highest home attendance: 27,719 (vs. Málaga, 28 August)
- Lowest home attendance: 1,730 (vs. Proodeftiki, 29 November)
- Average home league attendance: 9,571
Home colours	Away colours	Third colours

The 2012–13 season is Panathinaikos' 54th consecutive season in Super League Greece.

They also competed in the Greek Cup. They were eliminated from the UEFA Champions League and the UEFA Europa League.

== Players ==
=== First-team squad ===
Squad at end of season

Note: Flags indicate national team as defined under FIFA eligibility rules; some limited exceptions apply. Players may hold more than one non-FIFA nationality.

No.	Pos.	Nation	Player
2	DF	NED	Nicky Kuiper
3	FW	CIV	Ibrahim Sissoko
4	DF	FRA	Jean-Alain Boumsong
5	DF	POR	André Pinto
6	MF	ESP	Vitolo
7	DF	GRE	Charis Mavrias
9	FW	ESP	Toché
10	MF	GRE	Lazaros Christodoulopoulos
11	FW	ARG	Sebastián Leto
12	MF	ESP	Jokin Esparza
14	FW	URU	Bruno Fornaroli
16	DF	GRE	Giourkas Seitaridis (Captain)
17	MF	GRE	Zeca
18	DF	GRE	Panagiotis Spyropoulos
19	FW	ARG	Luciano Figueroa
20	MF	SEN	Pape Sow
21	FW	NZL	Kosta Barbarouses
22	DF	GRE	Stergos Marinos

No.	Pos.	Nation	Player
23	MF	GRE	Tasos Lagos
24	DF	GRE	Loukas Vyntra
25	GK	GRE	Stefanos Kotsolis
26	MF	GRE	Thanasis Dinas
27	GK	GRE	Orestis Karnezis
28	FW	GRE	Antonis Petropoulos
29	MF	GRE	Kostas Katsouranis
31	DF	GRE	Nikos Spiropoulos
33	GK	GRE	Alexandros Tabakis
34	MF	GRE	Spyros Fourlanos
40	GK	GRE	Stefanos Kapino
41	DF	GRE	Diamantis Chouchoumis
44	DF	VEN	José Manuel Velázquez
45	DF	GRE	Konstantinos Triantafyllopoulos
46	MF	GRE	Christos Donis
47	DF	GRE	Nikos Marinakis
49	MF	JPN	Yohei Kajiyama
61	MF	GHA	Quincy Owusu-Abeyie

== Transfers ==
=== In ===
Date	Pos.	Name	From	Fee
1 July 2012	FW	(New Zealand) Kosta Barbarouses	(Russia) Alania Vladikavkaz	Loan
6 July 2012	FW	(Ivory Coast) Ibrahim Sissoko	(Germany) VfL Wolfsburg	Loan
6 July 2012	MF	(Senegal) Pape Sow	(Portugal) Académica de Coimbra	Free
7 July 2012	DF	(Portugal) André Pinto	(Portugal) Porto	Free
8 July 2012	DF	(Venezuela) José Manuel Velázquez	(Spain) Villarreal B	Free
20 July 2012	FW	(Uruguay) Bruno Fornaroli	(Italy) Sampdoria	Free
14 August 2012	FW	(Ghana) Quincy Owusu-Abeyie	(Qatar) Al Sadd	Free
1 January 2013	MF	(Japan) Yohei Kajiyama	(Japan) FC Tokyo	Loan
31 January 2013	DF	(Greece) Panagiotis Spyropoulos	(Greece) Panionios	Free
31 January 2013	FW	(Greece) Thanasis Dinas	(Greece) Panachaiki	Free
31 January 2013	DF	(Netherlands) Nicky Kuiper	(Netherlands) Twente	Loan
31 January 2013	MF	(Spain) Jokin Arcaya	(Spain) Huesca	Free
11 February 2013	FW	(Argentina) Luciano Figueroa	(Ecuador) Emelec	Free

=== Out ===
Date	Pos.	Name	To	Fee
1 July 2012	FW	(Hungary) Gergely Rudolf	(Italy) Genoa	End of loan
1 July 2012	MF	(Brazil) Cleyton	(Turkey) Kayserispor	Free
1 July 2012	MF	(Greece) Sotiris Ninis	(Italy) Parma	Free
1 July 2012	MF	(Mozambique) Simão Mate Junior	(China) Shandong Luneng Taishan	Free
1 July 2012	MF	(France) Damien Plessis	(France) Arles-Avignon	Free
1 July 2012	MF	(Greece) Sotiris Leontiou	(Greece) Apollon Smyrnis	Free
1 July 2012	MF	(Greece) Giorgos Karagounis	(England) Fulham	Free
1 July 2012	DF	(Greece) Christos Melissis	(Greece) Panthrakikos	Free
1 July 2012	DF	(Mali) Cédric Kanté	(France) Sochaux	Free
1 July 2012	DF	(Sweden) Mattias Bjärsmyr	(Sweden) IFK Göteborg	Free
1 July 2012	DF	(Spain) Josu Sarriegi		Free
30 August 2012	DF	(Greece) Giorgos Ioannidis	(Greece) OFI	Free
1 October 2012	MF	(Greece) Kostas Katsouranis	(Greece) PAOK	Free
1 January 2013	FW	(Greece) Antonis Petropoulos	(Greece) AEK Athens	Free
21 January 2013	FW	(Argentina) Sebastián Leto	(Italy) Catania	Free
29 January 2013	FW	(Greece) Lazaros Christodoulopoulos	(Italy) Bologna	Free
29 January 2013	DF	(Greece) Nikos Spyropoulos	(Italy) Chievo	Free
30 January 2013	DF	(Greece) Loukas Vyntra	(Spain) Levante	Free

== Competitions ==
=== Super League Greece ===
==== Regular season ====
===== League table =====
Pos	Team	Pld	W	D	L	GF	GA	GD	Pts	Qualification or relegation
4	Atromitos	30	11	13	6	26	22	+4	46	Qualification for the Play-offs
5	PAS Giannina	30	12	8	10	28	24	+4	44	Qualification for the Play-offs
6	Panathinaikos (Note: Panathinaikos started the league season with minus 2 points because of severe crowd violence during their home match against Olympiacos last year.)	30	10	12	8	32	30	+2	40 (Note: 6th place play-off: Panathinaikos–Skoda Xanthi 3–0.)	
7	Skoda Xanthi	30	10	10	10	28	26	+2	40	Qualification for the Europa League second qualifying round
8	Panionios	30	11	3	16	35	42	−7	36 (Note: Head-to-head points: Panionios 9, Platanias 7, Panthrakikos 1.)	

Source: Super League Greece
Rules for classification: 1) Points; 2) Head-to-head points; 3) Head-to-head goal difference.
If in current league table there are tied teams after applying criteria 1 to 3, they are considered to share places and listed in Greek language alphabetic order.
If in final league table there are still tied teams after applying criteria 1 to 3, a decision match (or matches if they are more than two) are to be played but only in three cases: to determine the champion, to fill spots in the play-off or to determine the teams to be relegated. In any other case, the final standings of tied teams are determined with a public draw

===== Matches =====
25 August 2012 1	Levadiakos	0–1	Panathinaikos	Livadeia
21:30	Korbos (yellow card) 31'; Martins (yellow card) 33'; Zahui (yellow card) 86'	Summary	Vyntra 34'; Christodoulopoulos (yellow card) 35'; Marinos (yellow card) 49'; Petropoulos (yellow card) 53'; Seitaridis (yellow card) 67'	Stadium: Levadia Municipal Stadium; Attendance: 2,503; Referee: Georgios Kominis

31 August 2012 2	Panathinaikos	1–1	PAS Giannina	Athens
21:30	Velázquez 28'; Seitaridis (yellow card) 49'; Katsouranis (yellow card) 52' (red card) 52'; Vitolo (yellow card) 66'; Fornaroli (yellow card) 75'	Summary	Lila (yellow card) 27'; De Vincenti 45+1', (yellow card) 71'; Patsatzoglou (yellow card) 90+2'	Stadium: Stadium Spyros Louis; Attendance: 7,427; Referee: Anastasios Sidiropoulos

15 September 2012 3	Panthrakikos	1–0	Panathinaikos	Komotini
17:15	Makrydimitris (yellow card) 26'; Stathis (yellow card) 45'; Sarakatsanos (yellow card) 51'; Papadopoulos 83'	Summary	Christodoulopoulos (yellow card) 25'; Owusu-Abeyie (yellow card) 66'; Spyropoulos (yellow card) 79'; Vitolo (yellow card) 90'	Stadium: OPAP-Municipal Komotini Stadium; Attendance: 3,052; Referee: Alexander Aretopoulos

24 September 2012 4	Panathinaikos	1–1	Atromitos	Livadeia
20:30	Toché (yellow card) 12', (goal) 40' (pen.); Spyropoulos (yellow card) 42'; Zeca (yellow card) 85'	Summary	Chumbinho (yellow card) 38'; Giannoulis (yellow card) 39'; Iglesias (yellow card) 68', (goal) 76'	Stadium: Levadia Municipal Stadium; Attendance: 3,531; Referee: Ilias Spathas

30 September 2012 5	Panathinaikos	0–0	Asteras Tripolis	Athens
18:15		Summary	Bartolini (yellow card) 36'; Sankaré (yellow card) 54'; Tsabouris (yellow card) 67' (yellow-red card) 80'	Stadium: Olympic Stadium; Attendance: 8,145; Referee: Michael Koukoulakis

7 October 2012 6	Skoda Xanthi	1–2	Panathinaikos	Xanthi
18:15	Markovski 7'; Baxevanidis (yellow card) 10'; Bertos (yellow card) 56'	Summary	Christodoulopoulos 26', 29'; Spyropoulos (yellow card) 68'; Marinos (yellow card) 90'; Seitaridis (yellow card) 90+1'; Karnezis (yellow card) 90+3'	Stadium: Skoda Xanthi Arena; Attendance: 1,944; Referee: Praxitelis Zachariadis

21 October 2012 7	Panathinaikos	1–1	Aris	Athens
20:30	Seitaridis (yellow card) 27'; Vitolo (yellow card) 36'; Christodoulopoulos 76' (pen.)	Summary	Psychogios (yellow card) 33'; Coelho (yellow card) 39'; Aganzo (yellow card) 55'; Kasnaferis (yellow card) 65'; Papazaharias (red card) 75'; Gianniotas 88'; Sounas (yellow card) 90+2'	Stadium: Olympic Stadium; Attendance: 8,243; Referee: Haris Kalogeropoulos

29 October 2012 8	OFI	2–2	Panathinaikos	Heraklion
17:15	Koutsianikoulis 27'; Zacharakis (yellow card) 38'; Papazoglou 72'; Moniakis (yellow card) 76'; Banousis (yellow card) 90+3'	Summary	Toché 8', (yellow card) 60'; Chouchoumis (yellow card) 14'; Mavrias 29'; Vitolo (yellow card) 65'	Stadium: Theodoros Vardinogiannis Stadium; Attendance: 3,015; Referee: Stavros Tritsonis

4 November 2012 9	Panathinaikos	1–0	AEK Athens	Athens
19:30	Toché 24'; Fourlanos (yellow card) 51'; Seitaridis (yellow card) 83'; Chouchoumis (yellow card) 85'	Summary	Kondoes (yellow card) 41'; Vlachos (yellow card) 59'; Cordero (yellow card) 60'; Fountas (yellow card) 64'	Stadium: Olympic Stadium; Attendance: 12,528; Referee: Tasos Kakkos

12 November 2012 10	Kerkyra	0–0	Panathinaikos	Kerkyra
19:30	Boukouvalas (yellow card) 51'; Iliadis (yellow card) 66'; Karalis (yellow card) 87'; Tsokanis (yellow card) 90+1'; Anastasopoulos (yellow card) 90+3'	Summary	Petropoulos (yellow card) 63'	Stadium: Kerkyra Stadium; Attendance: 1,251; Referee: Georgios Daskalopoulos

18 November 2012 11	Panathinaikos	2–0	PAOK	Athens
19:30	Vyntra (yellow card) 23'; Zeca 51'; Vitolo 84' (pen.)	Summary	Katsikas (yellow card) 81'; Giannou (yellow card) 83'; Jacobo (yellow card) 85' (red card) 85'	Stadium: Olympic Stadium; Attendance: 13,511; Referee: Stavros Tritsonis

25 November 2012 12	Platanias	2–1	Panathinaikos	Platanias
17:15	Ucar 38'; Anastasakos 59' (pen.), (yellow card) 90+4'; Tzanis (yellow card) 70'; Aguilera (yellow card) 79'; Potouridis (yellow card) 90+1'; Maragoudakis (yellow card) 90+3'	Summary	Toché (yellow card) 22', (goal) 70' (pen.); Vyntra (yellow card) 58'; Zeca (yellow card) 68' (yellow-red card) 85'; Petropoulos (yellow card) 90'	Stadium: Perivolia Municipal Stadium; Attendance: 3,078; Referee: Alexander Aretopoulos

2 December 2012 13	Panionios	1–2	Panathinaikos	Athens
19:30	Avlonitis (yellow card) 56'; Dounis 78'; Kampantais (yellow card) 86'	Summary	Triantafyllopoulos (yellow card) 20'; Petropoulos 24'; Vyntra 28'; Vitolo (yellow card) 52'	Stadium: Nea Smyrni Stadium; Attendance: 2,981; Referee: Praxitelis Zachariadis

9 December 2012 14	Panathinaikos	2–2	Olympiacos	Athens
19:30	Mavrias 17'; Toché 67'	Summary	Djebbour 22', 34'; Maniatis (yellow card) 55'	Stadium: Olympic Stadium; Attendance: 27,673; Referee: Stavros Mantalos

16 December 2012 15	Veria	3–0	Panathinaikos	Veria
19:30	Ioannou 14', 44'; Bargan 55', (yellow card) 90'; N. Georgiadis (yellow card) 79'; Georgeas (yellow card) 81'; Olaitan (yellow card) 84'	Summary	Marinos (yellow card) 24'; Sissoko (yellow card) 81'	Stadium: Veria Stadium; Attendance: 2,331; Referee: Dimitris Thanos

5 January 2013 16	Panathinaikos	1–2	Levadiakos	Athens
19:30	Toché 12'; Owusu-Abeyie (yellow card) 79'	Summary	Vasileiou 38', 75', (yellow card) 65'; Mendy (yellow card) 68'; Koutsopoulos (yellow card) 70'; Machairas (yellow card) 79'	Stadium: Olympic Stadium; Attendance: 5,478; Referee: Dimitris Styliaras

13 January 2013 17	PAS Giannina	0–0	Panathinaikos	Ioannina
15:00	Keita (yellow card) 31'; Korovesis (yellow card) 53'	Summary	Sissoko (yellow card) 14'; Sow (yellow card) 28'; Toché (yellow card) 50'; Quincy (yellow card) 55'; Pinto (yellow card) 83'	Stadium: Zosimades Stadium; Attendance: 4,019; Referee: Marios Lampropoulos

19 January 2013 18	Panathinaikos	1–1	Panthrakikos	Athens
17:15	Boumsong (yellow card) 40'; Toché 74'; Zeca (yellow card) 90+2'	Summary	Papadopoulos (yellow card) 26', (goal) 85'; Baykara (yellow card) 88'; Lucero (yellow card) 90'	Stadium: Olympic Stadium; Attendance: 3,076; Referee: Giannis Delfakis

27 January 2013 19	Atromitos	1–2	Panathinaikos	Athens
19:30	Karamanos 90'	Summary	Zeca 59'; Boumsong 78'	Stadium: Peristeri Stadium; Attendance: 3,456; Referee: Dimitris Thanos

2 February 2013 20	Asteras Tripolis	2–2	Panathinaikos	Tripoli
19:30	De Blasis (yellow card) 16'; Rayo 26'; Perrone 90+6' (pen.)	Summary	Sissoko 6', 72'; Velázquez (yellow card) 16'; Vitolo (yellow card) 42'; Sow (yellow card) 87'; Boumsong (yellow card) 90+5'	Stadium: Gipedo Astera Tripolis; Attendance: 3,940; Referee: Athanasios Giachos

10 February 2013 21	Panathinaikos	0–1	Skoda Xanthi	Athens
19:30	Marinos (yellow card) 35'; Sow (yellow card) 39'	Summary	Onwuachi (yellow card) 23'; Dié 40', (yellow card) 58'; Komesidis (yellow card) 70'; Vasilakakis (yellow card) 89'	Stadium: Olympic Stadium; Attendance: 2,074; Referee: Tasos Kakkos

17 February 2013 22	Aris	1–0	Panathinaikos	Thessaloniki
19:30	Kasnaferis (yellow card) 9'; Zaradoukas (yellow card) 27'; Psychogios (yellow card) 41'; Papazaharias (yellow card) 79'; Coelho 89'; Tatos (yellow card) 90+2'; Aganzo (yellow card) 90+5'	Summary	Vitolo (yellow card) 10'; Pinto (yellow card) 35'; Toché (yellow card) 90+2'	Stadium: Kleanthis Vikelidis Stadium; Attendance: 7,618; Referee: Dimitris Styliaras

23 February 2013 23	Panathinaikos	3–1	OFI	Athens
19:30	Marinos 29'; Toché 39', 75'; Sow (yellow card) 44'	Summary	Koutsianikoulis 31'; Kiziridis (yellow card) 41'; Papazoglou (yellow card) 56' (yellow-red card) 90+5'; Kapouranis (yellow card) 90+3'	Stadium: Olympic Stadium; Attendance: 3,279; Referee: Georgios Liachoudis

3 March 2013 24	AEK Athens	0–2	Panathinaikos	Athens
19:30	Tsoukalas (yellow card) 27'; Bougaidis (yellow card) 69'; Guerreiro (yellow card) 72'	Summary	Marinos (yellow card) 54'; Vitolo 55', (yellow card) 63'; Zeca (yellow card) 60'; Sow 70'; Boumsong (yellow card) 77'	Stadium: Olympic Stadium; Attendance: 16,919; Referee: Ioannis Spathas

9 March 2013 25	Panathinaikos	1–0	Kerkyra	Athens
17:15	Boumsong (yellow card) 17'; Pinto (yellow card) 55'; Figueroa (yellow card) 72', (goal) 78' (pen.)	Summary	Agritis (yellow card) 18'; Athanasiou (yellow card) 45+3'; Venetis (yellow card) 73'; Éder (yellow card) 78'; Vasilogiannis (yellow card) 83'	Stadium: Olympic Stadium; Attendance: 10,019; Referee: Michael Koukoulakis

17 March 2013 26	PAOK	2–0	Panathinaikos	Thessaloniki
19:30	Camara 58'; Vukić 81'		Sow (yellow card) 1' (yellow-red card) 39'; Zeca (yellow card) 83'; Kajiyama (yellow card) 83'	Stadium: Toumba Stadium; Attendance: 19,856; Referee: Dimitris Styliaras

30 March 2013 27	Panathinaikos	0–1	Platanias	Athens
19:30	Marinos (yellow card) 38'; Zeca (yellow card) 88'	Summary	Nazlidis 4'; Kanakoudis (yellow card) 65'; Maragoudakis (yellow card) 75'	Stadium: Olympic Stadium; Attendance: 6,088; Referee: Stavros Tritsonis

7 April 2013 28	Panathinaikos	0–0	Panionios	Athens
19:30	Pinto (yellow card) 22'	Summary	Toskas (yellow card) 74'; Okoye (yellow card) 90+1'	Stadium: Olympic Stadium; Attendance: 5,246; Referee: Georgios Kominis

14 April 2013 29	Olympiacos	1–1	Panathinaikos	Piraeus
19:00	Greco (yellow card) 35'; Mitroglou 87'	Summary	Toché (yellow card) 20'; Sow (yellow card) 51'; Figueroa 73'; Karnezis (yellow card) 85'; Vitolo (yellow card) 89'; Triantafyllopoulos (yellow card) 90+1'	Stadium: Karaiskakis Stadium; Attendance: 32,018; Referee: Andreas Pappas

21 April 2013 30	Panathinaikos	3–2	Veria	Athens
19:00	Vitolo 6' (pen.), 77', (yellow card) 47' (yellow-red card) 90+2'; Sow 32'; P. Spyropoulos (red card) 56'	Summary	N. Georgiadis (red card) 5'; Guille (yellow card) 28'; Costly 57' (pen.), 67'; Kalogeris (yellow card) 47'; Orestes (yellow card) 72'; Georgeas (yellow card) 81' (yellow-red card) 90+3'	Stadium: Olympic Stadium; Attendance: 4,356; Referee: Praxitelis Zachariadis

==== Sixth place play-off ====
9 May 2013	Panathinaikos	3–0	Skoda Xanthi	Nea Smyrni
20:00	Zeca 27', 61'; Seitaridis (yellow card) 38'; Figueroa 76'; Marinos (yellow card) 82'	Summary	Dié (red card) 40'	Stadium: Nea Smyrni Stadium; Attendance: 1,061; Referee: Dimitris Thanos

=== Greek Cup ===
==== Third round ====
29 November 2012 First leg	Panathinaikos	4–0	Proodeftiki	Athens
18:30	Fornaroli 44', 62'; Christodoulopoulos 45+1'; Sow 84'	Summary	Vasilakos (yellow card) 41'	Stadium: Olympic Stadium; Attendance: TBA; Referee: Christos Mitsios

19 December 2012 Second leg	Proodeftiki	1–2 (1–6 agg.)	Panathinaikos	Nikaia, Piraeus
14:00	Panagiotopoulos 7'; Kousouris (yellow card) 33'	Summary	Sow (yellow card) 21'; Petropoulos 59'; Lagos (yellow card) 81'; Mavrias 83'	Stadium: Nikaia Municipal Gymnasium; Attendance: TBA; Referee: Giorgos Chatzis

==== Fourth round ====
9 January 2013 First leg	Panathinaikos	2–1	Platanias	Athens
20:00	Sow 16'; Sissoko (yellow card) 49'; Toché 65'; Pinto (yellow card) 81'	Summary	Maragoudakis (yellow card) 29'; Doe (yellow card) 58'; Nazlidis (yellow card) 74', (goal) 82' (pen.)	Stadium: Olympic Stadium; Attendance: TBA; Referee: Georgios Daskalopoulos

23 January 2013 Second leg	Platanias	1–0 (2–2a agg.)	Panathinaikos	Platanias
17:00	Kanakoudis (yellow card) 59'; Anastasakos 87', (yellow card) 88'	Summary	Sow (yellow card) 23'; Seitaridis (yellow card) 35'; Mavrias (yellow card) 78'	Stadium: Perivolia Municipal Stadium; Attendance: TBA; Referee: Stavros Mantalos

=== UEFA Champions League ===
==== Qualifying phase ====
===== Third qualifying round =====
31 July 2012 First leg	Motherwell (Scotland)	0–2	(Greece) Panathinaikos	Motherwell, Scotland
21:45 (19:45 local)			Christodoulopoulos 14'; Zeca (yellow card) 74'; Mavrias 76'	Stadium: Fir Park Stadium; Attendance: 9,035; Referee: Pol van Boekel (Netherlands)

8 August 2012 Second leg	Panathinaikos (Greece)	3–0 (5–0 agg.)	(Scotland) Motherwell	Athens, Greece
21:45	Christodoulopoulos 51'; Mavrias 75'; Sissoko 83'			Stadium: Olympic Stadium; Attendance: 27,000; Referee: Stephan Studer (Switzerland)

===== Play-off round =====
22 August 2012 First leg	Málaga (Spain)	2–0	(Greece) Panathinaikos	Málaga, Spain
21:45 (20:45 local)	Gámez (yellow card) 9'; Demichelis 17'; Eliseu 34'; Isco (yellow card) 47'; Duda (yellow card) 90+4'		Zeca (yellow card) 19'; Vyntra (yellow card) 72'	Stadium: La Rosaleda; Attendance: 24,605; Referee: Tony Chapron (France)

28 August 2012 Second leg	Panathinaikos (Greece)	0–0 (0–2 agg.)	(Spain) Málaga	Athens, Greece
21:45	Katsouranis (yellow card) 10'; Vitolo (yellow card) 63'	Report	Weligton (yellow card) 31'; Caballero (yellow card) 66'	Stadium: Olympic Stadium; Attendance: 27,719; Referee: Tom Harald Hagen (Norway)

=== UEFA Europa League ===
==== Group J ====
Pos	Team	Pld	W	D	L	GF	GA	GD	Pts	Qualification	LAZ	TOT	PAN	MRB
1	(Italy) Lazio	6	3	3	0	9	2	+7	12	Advance to knockout phase	—	0–0	3–0	1–0
2	(England) Tottenham Hotspur	6	2	4	0	8	4	+4	10	Advance to knockout phase	0–0	—	3–1	3–1
3	(Greece) Panathinaikos	6	1	2	3	4	11	−7	5		1–1	1–1	—	1–0
4	(Slovenia) Maribor	6	1	1	4	6	10	−4	4		1–4	1–1	3–0	—

Source: Soccerway

20 September 2012 1	Maribor (Slovenia)	3–0	(Greece) Panathinaikos	Maribor, Slovenia
22:05 (21:05 local)	Berić 25', (yellow card) 90'; Ibraimi 62', (yellow card) 63'; Tavares 88' (pen.)	Summary	Vitolo (yellow card) 75'; Spyropoulos (yellow card) 85' (yellow-red card) 90+4'; Velázquez (yellow card) 87'	Stadium: Ljudski vrt Attendance: 11,500; Referee: Alan Kelly (Republic of Ireland)

4 October 2012 2	Panathinaikos (Greece)	1–1	(England) Tottenham Hotspur	Athens, Greece
20:00	Vyntra (yellow card) 76'; Toché 77'	Report	Dawson 35'; Bale (yellow card) 40'; Townsend (yellow card) 90'	Stadium: Olympic Stadium; Attendance: 17,361; Referee: Florian Meyer (Germany)

25 October 2012 3	Panathinaikos (Greece)	1–1	(Italy) Lazio	Athens, Greece
20:00	Toché 90'	Report	Seitaridis 25' (o.g.); Cavanda (yellow card) 89'; Cana (yellow card) 89'	Stadium: Olympic Stadium; Attendance: 13,008; Referee: Carlos Clos Gómez (Spain)

8 November 2012 4	Lazio (Italy)	3–0	(Greece) Panathinaikos	Rome, Italy
22:05 (21:05 local)	Kozák 23', 40'; Floccari 59'; Cana (yellow card) 72'	Report	Seitaridis (yellow card) 24'; Vitolo (yellow card) 32'; Velázquez (yellow card) 42'	Stadium: Stadio Olimpico; Attendance: 9,068; Referee: Robert Schörgenhofer (Austria)

22 November 2012 5	Panathinaikos (Greece)	1–0	(Slovenia) Maribor	Athens, Greece
20:00	Vitolo 67' (pen.)	Report	Mejač (yellow card) 42' (yellow-red card) 45+1'; Mertelj (yellow card) 52'; Arghus (yellow card) 54'	Stadium: Olympic Stadium; Attendance: 12,000; Referee: Pierre Duhamel (France)

6 December 2012 6	Tottenham Hotspur (England)	3–1	(Greece) Panathinaikos	London, England
22:05 (20:05 local)	Adebayor 29'; Naughton (yellow card) 66'; Karnezis 76' (o.g.); Defoe 83'	Report	Zeca 54'; Spyropoulos (yellow card) 68'	Stadium: White Hart Lane; Attendance: 26,008; Referee: Paweł Gil (Poland)
