= Maniatis =

Maniatis can refer to:

== Surname ==
- Giannis Maniatis, Greek international football (soccer) player
- Kostas Maniatis, professional football (soccer) goalkeeper
- Tom Maniatis, professor of molecular and cellular biology
- Peter Maniatis, TV host and boxing promoter

== Place name ==
- Maniatis, a village in the community of Dafni, Arcadia, Greece
