= Arnaoutoglou =

Arnaoutoglou is a surname of Greek origin.

== People with the surname ==
- Grigoris Arnaoutoglou (born 1973), Greek television presenter
- Panagiotis Arnaoutoglou (born 1996), Greek former professional footballer
- Sakis Arnaoutoglou (born 1969), Greek television presenter and politician

== See also ==
- Anaqut
