= 2013–14 Panetolikos F.C. season =

Panetolikos
2013–14 season
- Chairman: (Greece) Fotis Kostoulas
- Manager: (Greece) Makis Chavos
- Stadium: Panetolikos Stadium
- Super League Greece: 8th
- Greek Cup: Round of 16
- Top goalscorer: League: Henri Camara (7 goals); All: Henri Camara (7 goals)
Home colours	Away colours	Third colours

In the 2013–14 season, Greek football club Panetolikos F.C. played in the Greek Super League after being relegated to second-tier Football League for a season.

For the first time in its history, Panetolikos secured a comfortable position allowing the team to stay in Greece's top league. At the end of the season, the club finished eighth.

== Players ==
No.	Name	Nationality	Position (s)	Date of Birth (Age)	Signed from	Notes
Goalkeepers
1	Rafael	(Brazil)	GK	5 May 1981 (32)	(Portugal) Porto	
Defenders
2	Dimitris Koutromanos	(Greece)	RB	25 February 1987 (26)	(Greece) Anagennisi Karditsa F.C.	
3	Vasilis Golias	(Greece)	LB	4 June 1985 (28)	(Greece) Asteras Tripolis	
Midfielders
Forwards

== Competitions ==
=== Super League Greece ===
==== League table ====
Pos	Team	Pld	W	D	L	GF	GA	GD	Pts
6	OFI	34	11	11	12	30	39	−9	44 (Note: Head-to-head points: OFI 4, Ergotelis 1.)
7	Ergotelis	34	11	11	12	39	40	−1	44
8	Panetolikos	34	11	9	14	32	33	−1	42 (Note: Head-to-head points (goal difference): Levadiakos 3 (0), Panetolikos 3 (0).)
9	Levadiakos	34	13	3	18	42	61	−19	42
10	Panthrakikos	34	11	8	15	39	52	−13	41 (Note: Head-to-head points: Panthrakikos 4, PAS Giannina 1.)

Source: Super League Greece
Rules for classification: 1) Points; 2) Head-to-head points; 3) Head-to-head goal difference; 4) Goals scored; 5) Goals against; 6) Play-offs (neutral ground).
(Note: Criteria 6 is only used if needed to decide champion, teams for relegation or teams for UEFA competitions).
If in final league table there are still tied teams after applying criteria 1 to 5, a decision match (or matches if they are more than two) are to be played but only in three cases: to determine the champion, to fill spots in the play-off or to determine the teams to be relegated. In any other case, the final standings of tied teams are determined with a public draw.
