= Charalampos Mavrias =

Greek footballer

Charis Mavrias
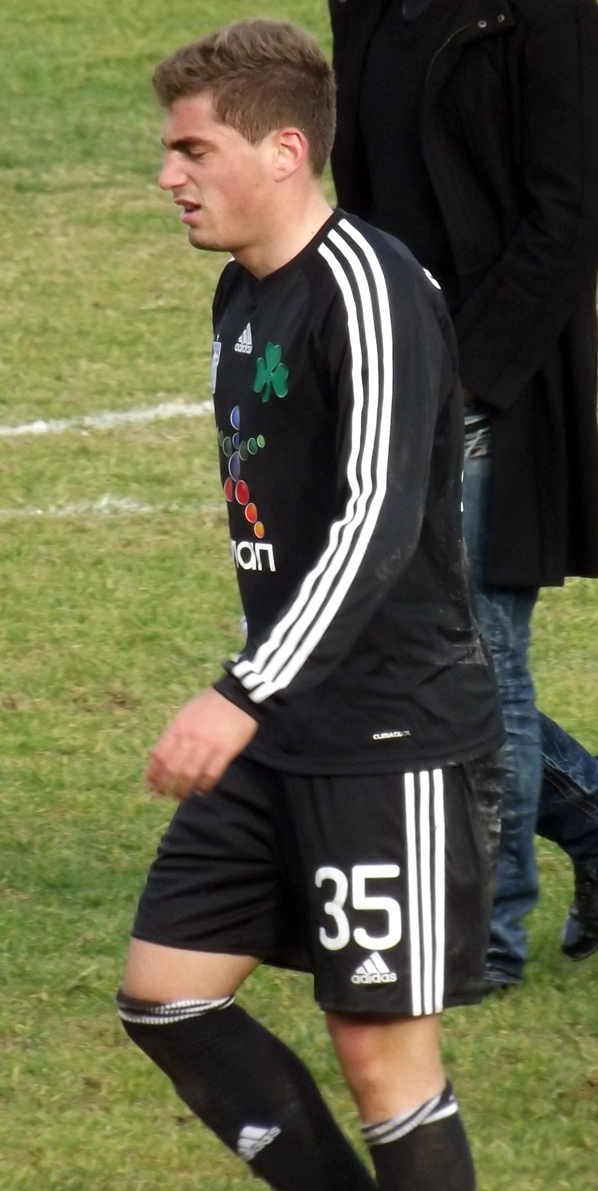
- Mavrias playing for Panathinaikos in 2011

Personal information
- Full name: Charalampos Mavrias
- Date of birth: 21 February 1994 (age 32)
- Place of birth: Zakynthos, Greece
- Height: 1.77 m (5 ft 10 in)
- Positions: Right back; right midfielder

Team information
- Current team: Panetolikos
- Number: 35

Youth career
- 2007–2010: Panathinaikos

Senior career*
Years	Team	Apps	(Gls)
2010–2013	Panathinaikos	54	(3)
2013–2016	Sunderland	4	(0)
2015	→ Panathinaikos (loan)	9	(1)
2016	→ Fortuna Düsseldorf (loan)	15	(1)
2016–2017	Karlsruher SC	22	(0)
2017–2018	Rijeka	6	(0)
2018–2019	Hibernian	2	(0)
2019–2021	Omonia	45	(3)
2021–2023	Apollon Limassol	47	(1)
2023–	Panetolikos	86	(4)

International career^{‡}
2009–2011	Greece U17	7	(0)
2011–2012	Greece U19	14	(3)
2011–2016	Greece U21	23	(5)
2012–2021	Greece	13	(0)
Medal record
Men's football
Representing Greece
UEFA European Under-19 Championship
Runner-up	2012 Estonia
- * Club domestic league appearances and goals as of 20 October 2026 ‡ National team caps and goals as of 25 May 2023

Charalampos Mavrias (Greek: Χαράλαμπος Μαυρίας; born 21 February 1994) is a Greek professional footballer who plays as a right back or a right midfielder for Super League club Panetolikos.

== Club career ==
=== Panathinaikos ===
Mavrias joined Panathinaikos' youth academy in 2007, aged 13, and was promoted to the first-team squad in 2010, after signing a professional contract in the previous year. On 20 October 2010 he made his first-team – and UEFA Champions League – debut, playing the last 12 minutes of a 0–0 home draw against Rubin Kazan, thus becoming the youngest Greek ever to appear in the competition, and the second youngest overall (only behind Celestine Babayaro, being surpassed later by Alen Halilović, Youri Tielemans and Rayan Cherki). Four days later he made his league debut, again as a substitute in a 0–1 loss at AEK.

Mavrias scored his first professional goal on 18 February 2012, netting his side's last of a 2–0 success at Ergotellis; he scored his first European goal on 31 July 2012, again netted the last of a 2–0 win at Motherwell in the first leg of the third qualifying round of the Champions League, one minute after coming onto the pitch as a substitute.

=== Sunderland ===
On 22 August 2013, Mavrias joined English Premier League side Sunderland on a four-year contract, for an undisclosed fee, rumoured to be £2-3 million. However, he was left out of the squad to play Southampton due to lack of match fitness.

Mavrias made his debut five days later, coming on as a second-half substitute in a 4–2 home success over Milton Keynes Dons, for the campaign's Football League Cup. He scored his first goal on 25 January of the following year, netting the winner against Kidderminster Harriers in the fourth round of the FA Cup.

On 2 February 2015, it was confirmed Mavrias had joined his former club Panathinaikos on loan until the end of the 2014–15 season.

Mavrias returned to Sunderland where he has been training and playing for the Black Cats Under-21s – and is understood to have impressed the club's coaching staff with his attitude and contribution. But Mavrias has not come close to being included in the first-team squad, however is not bitter over seeing his career stall on Wearside. “I took the decision to leave Panathinaikos and go to Sunderland, and I think anyone in my position would take this decision,” he told the Greek press. On 9 January 2016, almost two years after his last match with the first team, Mavrias entered the game in second half as a substitute in a 3–1 away loss against Arsenal for FA Cup.

=== Fortuna Düsseldorf ===
He was loaned to Fortuna Düsseldorf on 27 January 2016. Mavrias - who has 18 months remaining on his Sunderland contract - now has a chance to play regular first-team football after joining Düsseldorf until the end of the campaign, with a view to a permanent switch next summer. On 6 February 2016, he made his debut with a club, in a 0–1 home loss against Heidenheim.

Mavrias performance in Düsseldorf was satisfying, leading the club to set an offer for the Greek international winger. Unfortunately on 24 June 2016, Sunderland reject Fortuna Düsseldorf's lower bid than the £400,000 clause to convert the loan into a permanent switch.

=== Karlsruher SC ===
On 6 September 2016, after three seasons spent playing for Sunderland, only 7 official caps overall collected as a Black Cats man, plus 2 experiences as a loanee (at Fortuna Düsseldorf and Panathinaikos), he joined 2. Bundesliga side Karlsruher SC for a three-years contract. On 10 September 2016, he made his debut with the club in a 4–0 away loss against Union Berlin. Unfortunately, KSC harboured hopes of promotion back to the Bundesliga this summer, after finishing seventh last term had erupted during the year as the club relegated to Germany's third tier.

=== Rijeka ===
On 24 August 2017, Mavrias joined Rijeka in the Croatian First Football League on a one-year contract with a three-year extension option.

=== Hibernian ===
Mavrias signed with Scottish Premiership club Hibernian in October 2018 on a short-term contract, following a trial period. He made two first-team appearances for Hibernian, but then suffered a hamstring injury and was released at the end of his contract.

=== Omonia ===
On 29 December 2018, Omonia officially announced the signing of Mavrias on a 2,5 year contract. He made his debut for the team on 13 January 2019, on a match against Apollon Limassol for the Cypriot First Division, replacing Saša Živec on the 41st minute. On February 10, he scored his first goal on a match against Doxa Katokopias.

=== Apollon Limassol ===
On 11 June 2021, Apollon Limassol announced him, with a contract lasting until 2023.

=== Panetolikos ===
On 6 September 2023, Panetolikos announced him, with a contract lasting until 2025.

== International career ==
On 19 March 2019, Greece head coach Angelos Anastasiadis announced the call up of Mavrias for the match against Liechtenstein and Bosnia and Herzegovina for UEFA Euro 2020. Mavrias's talent is undoubted and has added versatility to his game, demonstrating he is able to operate as a right back if need be. His form in Cyprus has been patchy which again makes his selection fascinating. Anastasiadis may see him as a ‘wildcard’ option to throw on off the bench as his speed could add another dimension to a team severely lacking such a trait. He has already featured for the Greece national team on five occasions, but his last appearance came in 2014 as the Greece lost to Serbia in a friendly.

== Career statistics ==
As of 15 May 2026

Club	Season	League			National Cup		League Cup		Continental		Total	
Club	Season	Division	Apps	Goals	Apps	Goals	Apps	Goals	Apps	Goals	Apps	Goals
Panathinaikos	2010–11	Super League Greece	5	0	1	0	–		1	0	7	0
Panathinaikos	2011–12	Super League Greece	23	1	1	0	–		–		24	1
Panathinaikos	2012–13	Super League Greece	26	2	3	1	–		10	2	39	5
Panathinaikos	Total		54	3	5	1	–		11	2	70	6
Sunderland	2013–14	Premier League	4	0	1	1	1	0	–		6	1
Sunderland	2014–15	Premier League	–		–		–		–		–	
Sunderland	2015–16	Premier League	–		1	0	–		–		1	0
Sunderland	Total		4	0	2	1	1	0	–		7	1
Panathinaikos	2014–15	Super League Greece	9	1	—		—		—		9	1
Fortuna Düsseldorf	2015–16	2. Bundesliga	15	1	–		–		–		15	1
Karlsruher SC	2016–17	2. Bundesliga	22	0	–		–		–		22	0
Rijeka	2017–18	Croatian First Football League	6	0	3	0	–		1	0	10	0
Hibernian	2018–19	Scottish Premiership	2	0	–		–		–		2	0
Omonia	2018–19	Cypriot First Division	17	2	1	0	–		–		18	2
Omonia	2019–20	Cypriot First Division	21	1	2	0	–		–		23	1
Omonia	2020–21	Cypriot First Division	7	0	1	0	–		3	0	11	0
Omonia	Total		45	3	4	0	–		3	0	52	3
Apollon Limassol	2021–22	Cypriot First Division	25	1	2	0	–		1	0	28	1
Apollon Limassol	2022–23	Cypriot First Division	22	0	0	0	–		1	0	23	0
Apollon Limassol	Total		47	1	2	0	–		2	0	51	1
Panetolikos	2023–24	Super League Greece	24	2	5	1	–		–		29	3
Panetolikos	2024–25	Super League Greece	31	0	1	0	–		–		32	0
Panetolikos	2025–26	Super League Greece	23	1	2	0	–		–		25	1
Panetolikos	Total		78	3	8	0	–		–		86	4
Career total			282	12	24	3	1	0	17	2	323	17

== Honours ==
=== Club ===
Rijeka

- Atlantic Cup: 2017

Omonia

- Cypriot First Division: 2020–21

Apollon Limassol

- Cypriot First Division: 2021–22

=== International ===
Greece U19

- UEFA European Under-19 Championship runner-up: 2012
