= Emiliano Ellacopulos =

Greek-Argentine footballer

Personal information
- Full name: Emiliano Nahuel Ellacopulos
- Date of birth: 14 January 1992 (age 34)
- Place of birth: Tigre, Buenos Aires, Argentina
- Height: 1.75 m (5 ft 9 in)
- Position: Winger

Team information
- Current team: Ferro Carril Oeste

Senior career*
Years	Team	Apps	(Gls)
2010–2017	Tigre	28	(2)
2015	→ Unión Santa Fe (loan)	5	(1)
2015–2016	→ AEL Kalloni (loan)	15	(1)
2016–2017	Tigre	14	(1)
2017–2018	Aldosivi	16	(3)
2018–2019	Instituto	15	(1)
2019–2021	Temperley	25	(1)
2021–	Ferro Carril Oeste	38	(5)
- * Club domestic league appearances and goals as of 19:13, 17 July 2022 (UTC)

Emiliano Ellacopulos (born January 14, 1992) is a Greek-Argentine footballer who plays for Ferro Carril Oeste in the Primera B Nacional.

== Club career ==
Ellacopulos started his career in Club Atlético Tigre academy and he jumped to the first team after spending some years there. During 2015–16 season, Ellacopulos played for the Greek side AEL Kalloni on loan from Tigre.

== Personal life ==
His father is of Greek descent, his mother of Argentine descent and he was born in Tigre.
