= Jiří Kladrubský =

Czech footballer

Personal information
- Full name: Jiří Kladrubský
- Date of birth: 19 November 1985 (age 40)
- Place of birth: České Budějovice, Czechoslovakia
- Height: 1.87 m (6 ft 2 in)
- Position: Defensive midfielder

Youth career
- 1990–2003: České Budějovice

Senior career*
Years	Team	Apps	(Gls)
2003–2007	České Budějovice	31	(0)
2007–2011	Sparta Prague	82	(7)
2011–2014	Slovan Bratislava	66	(3)
2014–2015	České Budějovice	13	(2)
2015–2016	AEL Kalloni	9	(0)
2016	Pavia	4	(0)
2016–2021	České Budějovice	89	(12)

International career
2006–2007	Czech Republic U-21	8	(0)
2007–2008	Czech Republic	2	(0)

Managerial career
- 2021–2022: České Budějovice B (assistant)
- 2022: České Budějovice (assistant)
- 2023–2024: České Budějovice (caretaker)
- 2024: České Budějovice (assistant)
- 2025: České Budějovice (assistant)
- * Club domestic league appearances and goals as of 31 January 2021

Jiří Kladrubský (born 19 November 1985) is a former Czech footballer who last played for České Budějovice.

== Career ==
His primary position was as a defensive midfielder, although he can also play in any position along the back line, and has appeared regularly at left back, despite being naturally right footed.

On 17 November 2007 he was called up to the Czech Republic national football team for a Euro 2008 qualifier against Slovakia and made his debut on 21 November 2007 against Albania in a 6–1 victory.
