= Giannis Tsolakidis =

Greek footballer

Personal information
- Full name: Ioannis Tsolakidis
- Date of birth: 26 January 1996 (age 30)
- Place of birth: Giannitsa, Greece
- Height: 1.70 m (5 ft 7 in)
- Position: Right winger

Team information
- Current team: PAOK Dytiko

Youth career
- –2014: PAOK

Senior career*
Years	Team	Apps	(Gls)
2014–2017	PAOK	0	(0)
2015–2016	→ Panelefsiniakos (loan)	27	(1)
2016	→ Karmiotissa (loan)	2	(0)
2017	→ Aiginiakos (loan)	17	(3)
2017–2019	Aiginiakos		
2019–2020	Edessaikos		
2021	Thyella Sarakinon		
2021–2022	Iraklis Ampelokipi		
2022	Thyella Sarakinon		
2022–2023	Apollon Evropos		
2023–	PAOK Dytiko		

International career^{‡}
2014	Greece U18	3	(0)
2014	Greece U19	7	(0)
- * Club domestic league appearances and goals as of 17 July 2017 ‡ National team caps and goals as of 4 February 2017

Giannis Tsolakidis (Greek: Γιάννης Τσολακίδης, born 26 January 1996) is a Greek professional footballer who plays as a right winger for PAOK Dytiko.

== Club career ==
On 2 January 2017, it was announced that Tsolakidis signed a six-month loan deal with Aiginiakos. He left the club in the summer 2019. On 24 September 2019, Tsolakidis signed with Edessaikos.
