= Miroslav Marković =

Serbian footballer

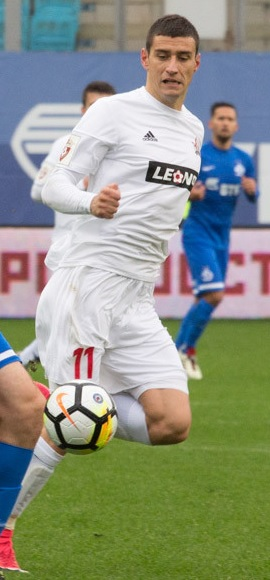
- Marković with SKA-Khabarovsk in 2017

Personal information
- Date of birth: 4 November 1989 (age 36)
- Place of birth: Aranđelovac, SFR Yugoslavia
- Height: 1.84 m (6 ft 1/2 in)
- Position: Forward

Youth career
- 2000–2005: Partizan

Senior career*
Years	Team	Apps	(Gls)
2007–2008	Krka	13	(0)
2008–2011	Baník Ostrava	5	(0)
2009–2010	→ Zenit Čáslav (loan)	16	(4)
2010	→ Vlašim (loan)	12	(2)
2010–2011	→ Viktoria Žižkov (loan)	26	(17)
2011–2012	Dukla Prague	14	(2)
2012	→ Ružomberok (loan)	7	(0)
2012	→ České Budějovice (loan)	15	(3)
2013–2015	Zbrojovka Brno	44	(10)
2015–2016	Kalloni	14	(1)
2016	Slovan Liberec	7	(0)
2017	Bohemians 1905	9	(2)
2017–2018	SKA Khabarovsk	24	(4)
2018–2019	Hassania Agadir	13	(1)
2020	Inđija	9	(1)
2020–2021	Baltika Kaliningrad	35	(5)
2022	Surkhon Termez	9	(2)
2022	Rad	11	(3)
2023	Dordoi Bishkek	9	(2)
2024	Tekstilac Odžaci	15	(3)
- * Club domestic league appearances and goals as of 13 February 2024

Miroslav Marković (Serbian Cyrillic: Мирослав Марковић, pronounced [mîroslaʋ mǎːrkoʋitɕ, mǐ-, - mǎ-]; born 4 November 1989) is a Serbian footballer who most recently played as forward for Tekstilac Odžaci.

== Club career ==
He signed a three-year contract with Dukla Prague in June 2011 after scoring 17 goals in the 2010–11 Czech 2. Liga while on loan at Viktoria Žižkov.

In July 2012, Marković headed to Dynamo České Budějovice on a loan deal. In January 2013, he finished his loan and moved to Zbrojovka Brno, where he signed a two-and-a-half-year contract.

On 5 August 2017, he signed with the Russian Premier League club SKA Khabarovsk.

On 16 July 2018 he signed with Moroccan side Hassania Agadir and become first Serbian player ever in Botola.

In March 2023, Marković signed for Kyrgyz Premier League club Dordoi Bishkek.

In February 2024, Marković signed for Prva liga Srbije club Tekstilac Odžaci.

== Career statistics ==
As of 5 August 2020

Club	Season	League			Cup		Continental		Total	
Club	Season	Division	Apps	Goals	Apps	Goals	Apps	Goals	Apps	Goals
Krka	2007–08	2. SNL	13	0	0	0	–		13	0
Baník Ostrava	2008–09	Czech First League	5	0	0	0	0	0	5	0
Čáslav	2009–10	2. liga	16	4	0	0	–		16	4
Vlašim	2009–10	2. liga	12	2	0	0	–		12	2
Viktoria Žižkov	2010–11	2. liga	26	17	0	0	–		26	17
Dukla Prague	2011–12	Czech First League	14	2	0	0	–		14	2
Ružomberok	2011–12	Slovak Super Liga	7	0	0	0	–		7	0
Dynamo České Budějovice	2012–13	Czech First League	15	3	0	0	–		15	3
Zbrojovka Brno	2012–13	Czech First League	8	0	0	0	–		8	0
Zbrojovka Brno	2013–14	Czech First League	24	6	0	0	–		24	6
Zbrojovka Brno	2014–15	Czech First League	12	4	0	0	–		12	4
Kalloni	2015–16	Super League Greece	15	1	3	1	–		18	2
Slovan Liberec	2016–17	Czech First League	7	0	1	2	2	0	10	2
Bohemians 1905	2016–17	Czech First League	9	2	0	0	–		9	2
SKA-Khabarovsk	2017–18	Premier Liga	17	4	1	1	–		18	5
Hassania Agadir	2018–19	Botola	15	1	0	0	9	1	22	2
Career total			215	46	5	4	11	1	229	51
