= Mahamane Cissé =

Nigerien footballer

Personal information
- Full name: Mahamane Cissé
- Date of birth: 27 December 1993 (age 32)
- Place of birth: Ansongo, Mali
- Height: 1.80 m (5 ft 11 in)
- Position: Forward

Team information
- Current team: AS Otohô

Senior career*
Years	Team	Apps	(Gls)
2011–2013	Djoliba AC		
2014–2016	AC Léopards		
2016	Ifeanyi Ubah		
2017	AEL Kalloni	14	(2)
2017	Aiginiakos	1	(0)
2018–2019	AS Otohô		
2019–2021	FC Nouadhibou		
2021–	AS Otohô		

International career^{‡}
2013	Mali U20		
2013–	Niger	38	(5)
- * Club domestic league appearances and goals ‡ National team caps and goals as of 19:09, 30 December 2019 (UTC)

Mahamane Cissé (born 27 December 1993) is a professional footballer who plays for AS Otohô. Born in Mali, he plays for the Niger national team.

== International ==
Cissé was born in Mali to a Malian father and Nigerien mother. He represented his country of birth at the 2013 African U-20 Championship in Algeria. However, later that year he opted to represent Niger internationally and made his debut for the Ménas on 7 September in a 2014 FIFA World Cup qualifier against Congo, scoring a goal in the 2–2 draw. After the match, Congo filed a complaint with FIFA with regards to Cissé's eligibility to play for Niger. However, FIFA confirmed that it had accepted a request for a change of association by the player, making him eligible to represent Niger internationally and rejected Congo's appeal.

=== International goals ===
Scores and results list Niger's goal tally first.

Goal	Date	Venue	Opponent	Score	Result	Competition
1.	7 September 2013	Stade Général Seyni Kountché, Niamey, Niger	Congo	1–0	2–2	2014 FIFA World Cup qualification
2.	10 September 2014	Estádio do Zimpeto, Maputo, Mozambique	Mozambique	1–1	1–1	2015 Africa Cup of Nations qualification
3.	13 October 2015	Stade Général Seyni Kountché, Niamey, Niger	Somalia	1–0	4–0	2018 FIFA World Cup qualification
4.	13 October 2015	Stade Général Seyni Kountché, Niamey, Niger	Somalia	4–0	4–0	2018 FIFA World Cup qualification
5.	27 May 2018	Stade Général Seyni Kountché, Niamey, Niger	Central African Republic	1–0	3–3	Friendly
