= Dimitrios Zouliotis =

Greek footballer

Personal information
- Full name: Dimitrios Zouliotis
- Date of birth: 12 June 1984 (age 42)
- Place of birth: Kalyvia, Agrinio, Greece
- Height: 1.77 m (5 ft 10 in)
- Position: Midfielder

Youth career
- 2002–2003: OFI

Senior career*
Years	Team	Apps	(Gls)
2001–2002	Panetolikos	23	(0)
2002–2003	OFI		
2003–2006	Panetolikos	47	(1)
2006–2007	Ethnikos Asteras	15	(0)
2007–2008	Aiolikos	28	(5)
2008–2010	Korinthos	46	(1)
2010–2013	Iraklis Psachna	68	(4)
2013–2014	Niki Volos	36	(1)
2014–2016	Lamia	40	(0)
2016–2017	AEL Kalloni	28	(2)
2017–2018	Sparti	28	(1)
2018–2021	Iraklis Psachna		
2021–2022	Chalkida		
2022–2023	Nea Artaki		
2023–2024	Amarynthiakos		
- * Club domestic league appearances and goals as of 8 July 2018

Dimitrios Zouliotis (Greek: Δημήτριος Ζουλιώτης; born 12 June 1984) is a Greek former footballer who played as a midfielder.

== Career ==
Born in Kalyvia, Agrinio, Zouliotis began his professional career with local side Panetolikos in July 2001.
