= Dimitrios Tairis =

Greek footballer

Personal information
- Date of birth: 3 December 1989 (age 36)
- Place of birth: Thessaloniki, Greece
- Height: 1.84 m (6 ft 1/2 in)
- Position: Goalkeeper

Youth career
- 2009–2010: Panthrakikos

Senior career*
Years	Team	Apps	(Gls)
2007–2008	Megas Alexandros Irakleia		
2008–2009	Visaltiakos		
2009–2012	Panthrakikos	6	(0)
2012–2013	Tilikratis		
2013–2015	Niki Volos	4	(0)
2015–2016	Apollon Smyrnis	17	(0)
2016–2017	AEL Kalloni	7	(0)
2017–2018	Apollon Smyrnis	4	(0)
2018–2019	Trikala	28	(0)
2019–2020	Ayia Napa	18	(0)
2020–2023	Kalamata	64	(0)
- * Club domestic league appearances and goals as of 16 June 2023

Dimitrios Tairis (Greek: Δημήτριος Ταΐρης; born 3 December 1989) is a Greek professional footballer who plays as a goalkeeper.

== Career ==
Tairis' professional career began in 2009 at 19 when he signed a contract with Panthrakikos. In the 2009–10 season, he was a member of the Panthrakikos U21 and simultaneously played with Panthrakikos' first squad.

== Career statistics ==
Last update: 28 June 2010

season	club	league	Championship		Nation cup		Europe cup		Total	
season	club	league	appear	goals	appear	goals	appear	goals	appear	goals
2007–08	Megas Alexandros Irakleia	Regional								
2008–09	Visaltiakos	Delta Ethniki								
2009–10	Panthrakikos	Super League	5	0	0	0	0	0	5	0
2010–11	Panthrakikos	Football League	0	0	0	0	0	0	0	0
2011–12	Panthrakikos	Football League	1	0	0	0	0	0	1	0
career total			6	0	0	0	0	0	6	0
