= Stathis Vasiloudis =

Greek footballer (born 1996)

Personal information
- Full name: Efstathios Vasiloudis
- Date of birth: 23 February 1996 (age 30)
- Place of birth: Thessaloniki, Greece
- Height: 1.77 m (5 ft 10 in)
- Position: Midfielder

Team information
- Current team: Panachaiki

Youth career
- –2014: Aris Thessaloniki
- 2014–2016: Panetolikos

Senior career*
Years	Team	Apps	(Gls)
2013–2014	Aris U19	2	(0)
2014–2016	Panetolikos U19	22	(1)
2016–2019	Panetolikos	33	(0)
2019–2020	Kerkyra	11	(0)
2020–2021	Olympiacos Volos	20	(1)
2021–2023	Athens Kallithea	44	(0)
2023–2025	Ilioupolis	48	(2)
2025–2026	Apollon Kalamarias	7	(3)
2026–	Panachaiki	0	(0)

International career
2016–2018	Greece U21	4	(0)
- * Club domestic league appearances and goals as of 1 July 2025

Stathis Vasiloudis (Greek: Στάθης Βασιλούδης; born 23 February 1996) is a Greek professional footballer who plays as a central midfielder.

== Club career ==
Born in Thessaloniki, Vasiloudis turned professional with Super League 1 club Panetolikos, making 26 total appearances in the top flight in four seasons with the club, while earning four caps with the Greece Under-21 national team.

He would later move on to Kerkyra and Olympiacos Volos, and then join Athens Kallithea FC in September 2021. Vasiloudis has played in both full-back positions and in midfield for AKFC.

Signed a contract with Panachaiki on 20 July 2026.

== International career ==
He made his first appearance with Greece U-21 on 11 November 2016 in a friendly game against Cyprus.
