= Sonny Karlsson =

Swedish footballer

Personal information
- Date of birth: 14 June 1988 (age 38)
- Place of birth: Sweden
- Height: 1.92 m (6 ft 4 in)
- Position: Forward

Team information
- Current team: Oskarshamns AIK
- Number: 11

Senior career*
Years	Team	Apps	(Gls)
2008	Assyriska BK	–	(–)
2009	Grimsås IF	–	(–)
2010	Jonsereds IF	–	(–)
2011	Utsiktens BK	19	(17)
2012	Landskrona BoIS	7	(0)
2012	Ljungskile SK	12	(0)
2013	Etar 1924	7	(1)
2013	Utsiktens BK	11	(5)
2014	Lärje-Angereds IF	14	(7)
2014	IS Halmia	11	(3)
2015	Syrianska FC	25	(6)
2016	AEL Kalloni	8	(0)
2016–2017	Al-Rustaq	–	(–)
2017	Assyriska BK	10	(6)
2017	IK Oddevold	7	(1)
2018–	Oskarshamns AIK	53	(13)
- * Club domestic league appearances and goals as of 23:19, 19 February 2020 (UTC)

Sonny Karlsson (born 14 June 1988) is a Swedish footballer who plays as a forward for Oskarshamns AIK.
