= Lucas Favalli =

Italian Argentine football midfielder

Personal information
- Full name: Lucas Gabriel Favalli
- Date of birth: July 16, 1985 (age 41)
- Place of birth: Córdoba, Argentina
- Height: 1.71 m (5 ft 7 in)
- Position: Midfielder

Senior career*
Years	Team	Apps	(Gls)
2002–2003	Racing de Córdoba		
2003–2006	Talleres		
2006–2008	Apollon Kalamarias	48	(4)
2008–2011	Atromitos	74	(6)
2011–2012	Levadiakos	23	(1)
2012–2013	Panetolikos	42	(2)
2013–2014	Instituto de Córdoba	36	(9)
2014–2015	Huracán	7	(0)
2015–2016	Levadiakos	9	(0)
2016	AEL Kalloni	8	(1)
2016–2017	Villa Dálmine	24	(2)
2017–2018	Ialysos	1	(0)
- * Club domestic league appearances and goals as of 2 October 2017

Lucas Favalli (born 16 July 1985) is an Italian Argentine football midfielder.

== Career ==
=== Early career ===
Favalli started his career at 3rd division (Interior) side Racing de Córdoba. He later joined Talleres de Córdoba in the Primera Division Argentina in 2002.

=== Greece ===
In 2006 Favalli was spotted by scouts from Apollon Kalamarias, and was signed by the club during the summer 2006 transfer window.

From 2006 till 2013 he played for various Greek clubs both in the Greek Super League and the Football League. His last club was Panetolikos of the Football League where he signed a one-year contract.

=== Return to Argentina ===
On 21 June 2013, after seven years in Greece, Favalli signed a one-year contract with Argentinian Primera B Nacional club Instituto de Córdoba for an undisclosed fee. In his first season, he completed 36 games and scored 9 goals. As a result of his excellent performance, he signed with Huracán, helping the club to promote to the Argentinian Primera Division after the play-offs.

=== Return to Greece ===
On 26 August 2015, Favalli signed a two-year contract with his former club Levadiakos for an undisclosed fee. On 21 January 2016, he signed a six months' contract with Super League rivals AEL Kalloni on loan from Levadiakos. Two days later, he scored on his debut, a 2–0 home win against Panthrakikos.

== Honours ==
Atromitos

- Football League: 1 : 2010
