= Pape Habib Sow =

Senegalese footballer

Pape Sow
Personal information
- Full name: Pape Habib Sow
- Date of birth: December 2, 1985 (age 40)
- Place of birth: Dakar, Senegal
- Height: 1.80 m (5 ft 11 in)
- Position: Defensive midfielder

Youth career
- 2003–2005: Strasbourg B

Senior career*
Years	Team	Apps	(Gls)
2005–2006	Sochaux	1	(0)
2006–2008	Entente SSG	38	(5)
2008–2009	LB Châteauroux	12	(0)
2009–2010	União de Leiria	0	(0)
2010–2012	Académica	34	(0)
2012–2013	Panathinaikos	16	(2)
2013–2014	Elazığspor	14	(1)
2015	Rio Ave F.C.	6	(0)
2016	Inter Turku	5	(0)
- * Club domestic league appearances and goals as of 1 January 2017

Pape Habib Sow (born December 2, 1985, in Dakar) is a Senegalese former footballer who played as a defensive midfielder.

== Career ==
After making an impact as a defensive midfielder to Portugal with Académica, Sow attracted attention from many clubs and most notably from the Greek club, Panathinaikos leading to the signing of a 3-year contract with the Greens, which will keep him to the club until 2015. He scored his first goal for his new club in a Greek Cup match against Proodeftiki and his first League goal in a derby against AEK Athens. After leaving Rio Ave, he signed for Veikkausliiga side Inter.

== Honours ==
Académica

- Portuguese Cup: 2011–12
