= Michalis Kallergis =

Greek footballer

Personal information
- Full name: Michail Kallergis
- Date of birth: 26 September 1996 (age 30)
- Height: 1.73 m (5 ft 8 in)
- Position: Midfielder

Team information
- Current team: Aris Petroupolis

Youth career
- –2013: Olympiacos
- 2013–2014: Apollon Smyrnis

Senior career*
Years	Team	Apps	(Gls)
2014	Apollon Smyrnis		
2014	Kozani		
2015–2018	Apollon Smyrnis	7	(1)
2018–2020	Ionikos	15	(2)
2020	Egaleo	5	(0)
2020–2021	Asteras Vlachioti	14	(0)
2021–2023	P.A.O. Rouf	13	(0)
2023 - 2025	GS Marko	11	
2025-	Aris Petroupolis	5	
- * Club domestic league appearances and goals as of 15:10, 21 December 2020 (UTC)

Michalis Kallergis (Greek: Μιχάλης Καλλέργης; born 26 August 1996) is a Greek professional footballer who plays as an attacking midfielder for Gamma Ethniki side Aris Petroupolis.

== Career ==
=== Club career ===
He played seven times for Apollon Smyrnis in Super League 1 and Football League Greece between 2015 and 2018.

In August 2020, Kallergis moved to Asteras Vlachioti.

In August 2021, Kallergis moved to PAO Rouf where he played for the following two seasons.

In July 2023, Kallergis moved to GS Marko.

In January 2025, Kallergis moved to Aris Petroupolis where he plays to this day.

He has previously played for Football League Greece side P.A.O. Rouf between 2021 and 2023.
