= Milan Svojić =

Serbian footballer

Personal information
- Full name: Milan Svojić
- Date of birth: 9 October 1985 (age 41)
- Place of birth: Užice, SFR Yugoslavia
- Height: 1.80 m (5 ft 11 in)
- Position: Midfielder

Senior career*
| Years | Team | Apps | (Gls) |
| 2003–2005 | Sloboda Užice | 40 | (5) |
| 2005–2007 | Sevojno | 19 | (1) |
| 2007–2010 | Mladi Radnik | 81 | (3) |
| 2010–2012 | Metalac Gornji Milanovac | 40 | (4) |
| 2012–2013 | Radnički 1923 | 23 | (0) |
| 2013–2014 | Horizont Turnovo | 24 | (2) |
| 2014–2015 | Ermionida | 19 | (0) |
| 2015–2016 | EN Paralimni | 9 | (1) |
| 2016–2017 | Novi Pazar | 6 | (0) |
| 2017 | AEL Kalloni | 10 | (0) |
| 2017–2018 | Metalac Gornji Milanovac | 12 | (3) |
| 2018 | Shan United | 5 | (0) |
| 2019 | Víkingur Gøta | 5 | (0) |
| 2019 | → ÍF (loan) | 9 | (0) |
| Total | | 302 | (19) |
- * Club domestic league appearances and goals as of 01:18, 7 July 2019 (UTC)

Milan Svojić (Serbian Cyrillic: Милан Својић; born 9 October 1985) is a Serbian retired footballer.

Svojić joined Faroes side Víkingur Gøta in 2019, alongside compatriot Vukašin Tomić. Svojić was then loaned out to ÍF Fuglafjarðar in the summer.
