= Kyriakos Stratilatis =

Greek footballer (born 1988)

Personal information
- Date of birth: 5 January 1988 (age 38)
- Place of birth: Kavala, Greece
- Height: 1.86 m (6 ft 1 in)
- Position: Goalkeeper

Team information
- Current team: ASIL Lysi
- Number: 86

Senior career*
Years	Team	Apps	(Gls)
2006–2008	Aris	0	(0)
2008–2012	Levadiakos	22	(0)
2012–2013	Kerkyra	4	(0)
2013–2015	Levadiakos	22	(0)
2015–2016	Olympiacos Volos	13	(0)
2016	AEL Kalloni	0	(0)
2016–2018	Alki Oroklini	34	(0)
2018–2019	Onisilos Sotira 2014	19	(0)
2019–2021	Ethnikos Achna	9	(0)
2021–2022	Agrotikos Asteras	5	(0)
2022–2023	Olympias Lympion	19	(0)
2024–	ASIL Lysi	53	(0)

International career
2008	Greece U19	11	(0)
2009	Greece U21	3	(0)
- * Club domestic league appearances and goals as of 3 May 2026

Kyriakos Stratilatis (Greek: Κυριάκος Στρατηλάτης; born 5 January 1988) is a Greek professional footballer who plays as a goalkeeper for Cypriot club ASIL Lysi.

He has played also for Greece U21.

== International career ==
He was a starter in four games of the Greek team that reached the final during the 2007 UEFA European Under-19 Football Championship.
