= Anestis Anastasiadis =

Greek footballer

Personal information
- Full name: Anestis Anastasiadis
- Date of birth: 21 January 1983 (age 43)
- Place of birth: Ptolemaida, Greece
- Height: 1.86 m (6 ft 1 in)
- Position: Center back

Team information
- Current team: Giouchtas (manager)

Youth career
- Iraklis Ptolemaida

Senior career*
| Years | Team | Apps | (Gls) |
| 2001–2002 | Barcelona B | 2 | (0) |
| 2002–2006 | OFI | 47 | (0) |
| 2006–2007 | Kerkyra | 13 | (0) |
| 2007–2008 | Ethnikos Asteras | 26 | (0) |
| 2008–2009 | Ionikos | 27 | (0) |
| 2009–2012 | Panetolikos | 71 | (1) |
| 2012–2016 | AEL Kalloni | 110 | (7) |
| 2016–2019 | Lamia | 64 | (2) |
| 2019–2020 | AO Damasta | | |
| 2020–2021 | Atsalenios | | |

Managerial career
- 2021–2022: Atsalenios
- 2022–2023: Apollon Smyrnis (assistant)
- 2024–2026: Atsalenios
- 2026–: Giouchtas
- * Club domestic league appearances and goals as of 22:05, 6 May 2019 (UTC)

Anestis Anastasiadis (Greek: Ανέστης Αναστασιάδης; born 21 January 1983) is a Greek football manager and former professional footballer who played as a defender. He currently manages Giouchtas.

== Career ==
=== AO Damasta ===
On 19 September 2019 it was confirmed, that 36-year-old Anastasiadis had joined AO Damasta.
