= Panagiotis Arnaoutoglou =

Greek footballer (born 1996)

Personal information
- Full name: Panagiotis Arnaoutoglou
- Date of birth: 30 May 1996 (age 30)
- Place of birth: Athens, Greece
- Height: 1.83 m (6 ft 0 in)
- Position: Left-back

Youth career
- –2014: Panathinaikos
- 2014–2015: Karlsruher SC

Senior career*
Years	Team	Apps	(Gls)
2015	Karlsruher SC II	2	(0)
2015–2016	Apollon Smyrnis	4	(0)
2016–2017	AEL Kalloni	1	(0)
2017	Panelefsiniakos	20	(0)
2017–2019	AO Chania Kissamikos	25	(0)
2019–2020	Kavala	12	(0)
2020–2021	Ierapetra	16	(0)
2021–2022	Irodotos	12	(1)
2022–2023	Panelefsiniakos		
2023	Aiolikos	3	(0)

International career^{‡}
2012–2013	Greece U17	5	(0)
2014	Greece U19	4	(0)
- * Club domestic league appearances and goals as of 31 January 2023 ‡ National team caps and goals as of 15 November 2014

Panagiotis Arnaoutoglou (Greek: Παναγιώτης Αρναούτογλου; born 30 May 1996) is a Greek former professional footballer who played as a left-back.
