= Kostas Maniatis =

Greek footballer

Personal information
- Full name: Konstantinos Maniatis
- Date of birth: 13 May 1983 (age 43)
- Place of birth: Keratsini, Greece
- Position: Goalkeeper

Senior career*
| Years | Team | Apps | (Gls) |
| 2003–2004 | Panargiakos | 24 | (0) |
| 2005–2008 | Kalamata | 2 | (0) |
| 2008–2009 | Korinthos | 27 | (0) |
| 2009–2010 | Panetolikos | 10 | (0) |
| 2010–2012 | Kallithea | 11 | (0) |
| 2012–2013 | Fokikos | 2 | (0) |
| 2013–2014 | Paniliakos | 3 | (0) |
| 2014–2015 | Iraklis Psachna F.C. | 15 | (0) |
| 2015–2016 | Panelefsiniakos F.C. | 26 | (0) |
| 2016–2017 | AEL Kalloni | 17 | (0) |
- * Club domestic league appearances and goals

Kostas Maniatis (Greek: Κώστας Μανιάτης; born 13 May 1983) is a Greek retired footballer who played for AEL Kalloni in the Football League as a goalkeeper.
