= Panagiotis Spyropoulos =

Greek footballer

Personal information
- Date of birth: 21 August 1992 (age 34)
- Place of birth: Athens, Greece
- Height: 1.79 m (5 ft 10 in)
- Position: Right back

Youth career
- –2010: Aittitos Spata
- 2010–2011: Panionios

Senior career*
| Years | Team | Apps | (Gls) |
| 2011–2013 | Panionios | 15 | (0) |
| 2011 | → Niki Volos (loan) | 0 | (0) |
| 2013–2015 | Panathinaikos | 14 | (1) |
| 2015–2016 | AEL Kalloni | 11 | (0) |
| 2016–2017 | Lamia | 26 | (0) |
| 2017–2018 | Doxa Drama | 16 | (0) |
| 2018–2019 | Aittitos Spata | 21 | (1) |
| 2019–2020 | Egaleo | 21 | (0) |
| 2020–2021 | Doxa Drama | 11 | (0) |
| 2021–2025 | Mykonos | | |
| 2025–2026 | Malesina | | |

International career
| 2012 | Greece U21 | 2 | (0) |
- * Club domestic league appearances and goals as of 7 March 2021

Panagiotis Spyropoulos (Greek: Παναγιώτης Σπυρόπουλος, born 21 August 1992) is a Greek professional footballer who plays for as a right back.

He has previously played for Panathinaikos, Panionios, Niki Volos on loan and Kalloni.

== Club career ==
Spyropoulos started his career at Delta Ethniki side Aittitos Spata, from where Panionios snatched him in July 2010 and placed him in the club's under-20 team. In 2011, he joined Football League 2 side Niki Volos on loan from Panionios. On 27 August 2012, Spyropoulos made his Super League debut for Panionios in a victorious season opener against Aris, a match where both teams used only Greek players in the starting lineups for the first time in a First Division match since 1990.

On 4 January 2013, Panathinaikos announced the signing of Spyropoulos in a 4-year deal, but his contract would be valid on 1 June 2013, when the young defender's contract with Panionios was due to expire. Finally, on 31 January 2013, Spyropoulos signed with Panathinaikos. He spent three seasons with the "Greens" in which he made a total of just 20 appearances across all competitions. In September 2015, he moved to fellow Super League side AEL Kalloni.

In July 2016, Spyropoulos dropped to the second level and signed a contract with Lamia, with whom he celebrated promotion at the end of the season. He made a contribution to the club's feat with 26 appearances, all of which as a starter. He then moved clubs again, signing with fellow Football League Doxa Drama in September 2017. On 10 September 2018, he signed a contract with newly promoted side Aittitos Spata on a free transfer. On 27 October 2018, he scored in a 2–1 away loss against Platanias.

== Personal life ==
Panagiotis shares the same last name as another full back who starred at Panionios, Greek international Nikos Spyropoulos.

== Honours ==
Panathinaikos

- Greek Cup: 2014
