= Vasilios Golias =

Greek footballer

Personal information
- Full name: Vasilios Golias
- Date of birth: 4 June 1985 (age 41)
- Place of birth: Ioannina, Greece
- Height: 1.78 m (5 ft 10 in)
- Position: Left back

Team information
- Current team: Nafpaktiakos Asteras

Youth career
- PAS Giannina

Senior career*
Years	Team	Apps	(Gls)
2004–2007	Asteras Tripolis		
2007–2008	→ Panetolikos (loan)	33	(0)
2008–2014	Panetolikos	123	(1)
2014–2016	Apollon Smyrnis	32	(0)
2016	AEL Kalloni	12	(0)
2016–2019	Trikala	58	(1)
2019–	Nafpaktiakos Asteras		
- * Club domestic league appearances and goals as of 1 December 2018 (UTC)

Vasilios Golias (Greek: Βασίλειος Γκόλιας; born 4 June 1985) is a professional footballer who currently plays for Nafpaktiakos Asteras as a left back.

== Career ==
On 29 January 2019 it was announced, that Golias had joined Nafpaktiakos Asteras.
