= Savvas Tsampouris =

Greek footballer

Personal information
- Date of birth: 16 July 1986 (age 40)
- Place of birth: Athens, Greece
- Height: 1.80 m (5 ft 11 in)
- Position: Right-back

Team information
- Current team: OFI (head of football operations)

Senior career*
Years	Team	Apps	(Gls)
2006–2008	Chaidari	53	(15)
2008–2009	Ilisiakos	32	(3)
2009–2010	Egaleo	26	(1)
2010–2014	Asteras Tripolis	84	(2)
2014–2016	AEL Kalloni	44	(1)
2016–2017	Nea Salamina	30	(2)
2017–2019	Levadiakos	57	(1)
2019	Nea Salamina	9	(0)
2020–2021	Apollon Smyrnis	29	(2)

Managerial career
- 2021–2022: Apollon Smyrnis (team manager)
- 2022–: OFI (head of football operations)
- * Club domestic league appearances and goals as of 15 May 2021

Savvas Tsampouris (Greek: Σάββας Τσαμπούρης; born 16 July 1986) is a Greek former professional footballer who played as a right-back.

== Career ==
Tsampouris previously played for Egaleo, Ilisiakos, Chaidari and Asteras Tripolis. In the summer of 2014 he was transferred to AEL Kalloni. On 20 May 2016, he signed a contract with Cypriot club Nea Salamina for an undisclosed fee.

On 30 June 2021, Apollon Smyrnis announced his retirement as a professional footballer, but not his retirement from an involvement in football, naming him in the same announcement as the new team manager of the club.

== Career statistics ==
As of 1 June 2021

Club	Season	League			Cup		Continental		Other		Total	
Club	Season	Division	Apps	Goals	Apps	Goals	Apps	Goals	Apps	Goals	Apps	Goals
Chaidari	2006–07	Super League Greece 2	29	6	3	2	—		—		32	8
Chaidari	2007–08	Super League Greece 2	24	9	0	0	—		—		24	9
Chaidari	Total		53	15	3	2	—		—		56	17
Ilisiakos	2008–09	Super League Greece 2	32	3	2	0	—		—		34	3
Egaleo	2009–10	Super League Greece 2	26	1	2	1	—		—		28	2
Asteras Tripolis	2010–11	Super League Greece	6	0	0	0	—		—		6	0
Asteras Tripolis	2011–12	Super League Greece	26	1	4	1	—		—		30	2
Asteras Tripolis	2012–13	Super League Greece	32	1	7	0	4	0	—		43	1
Asteras Tripolis	2013–14	Super League Greece	20	0	1	0	2	0	—		23	0
Asteras Tripolis	Total		84	2	12	1	6	0	—		102	3
AEL Kalloni	2014–15	Super League Greece	19	1	2	0	—		—		21	1
AEL Kalloni	2015–16	Super League Greece	25	0	4	0	—		—		29	0
AEL Kalloni	Total		44	1	6	0	—		—		50	1
Nea Salamina	2016–17	Cypriot First Division	30	2	1	0	—		—		31	2
Levadiakos	2017–18	Super League Greece	28	0	1	0	—		—		29	0
Levadiakos	2018–19	Super League Greece	29	1	1	0	—		—		30	1
Levadiakos	Total		57	1	2	0	—		—		59	1
Nea Salamina	2019–20	Cypriot First Division	9	0	0	0	—		—		9	0
Apollon Smyrnis	2019–20	Super League Greece 2	9	0	—		—		—		9	0
Apollon Smyrnis	2020–21	Super League Greece	20	2	2	0	—		—		22	2
Apollon Smyrnis	Total		29	2	2	0	—		—		31	2
Career total			354	27	31	4	6	0	0	0	391	31

== Honours ==
Asteras Tripolis

- Greek Cup runner-up: 2012–13
