= 2011–12 AEL Kalloni F.C. season =

AEL Kalloni
2011–12 season
- President: Nikos Michalakis
- Head coaches: Luciano de Souza, Ioannis Matzourakis
- Stadium: Municipal Stadium of Mytilene
- Football League: 5th after Promotion play-offs
- Greek Cup: Fourth Round
- Top goalscorer: League: Leozinho (13 goals); All: Leozinho (14 goals)
- Highest home attendance: n/a
- Lowest home attendance: n/a
- Average home league attendance: n/a
Home colours	Away colours	Third colours

The 2011–12 season was AEL Kalloni's first season in the Football League, the second tier of the Greek football league system.

== Club ==
=== Coaching staff ===
Position	Staff
Head coach	(Greece) Ioannis Matzourakis
Assistant coach	(Brazil) Luciano de Souza
Goalkeeping coach	(Serbia) Jovan Mihajlovic
Fitness coach	(Greece) Pantelis Pantelopoulos
Physiotherapist	(Greece) Panagiotis Psouchlos

Last updated: 5 March 2012
Source: AEL Kalloni F.C.

=== Kit ===
Supplier: Erreà

Home	Home (alt)	Away	Third

Last updated: 4 January 2012.
Source: AEL Kalloni F.C.

=== Other information ===
President & Owner	(Greece) Nikos Michalakis
Vice President I	(Greece) Kostas Papadopoulos
Vice President II	(Greece) Stelios Sfakianakis
Technical Director	(Greece) Prokopis Kartalis
General Manager	(Greece) Michalis Karavasilis
Ground (capacity and dimensions)	Municipal Stadium of Mytilene (2,850 / 102x65 metres)

Last updated: 1 October 2011
Source: AEL Kalloni F.C.

== Competitions ==
=== Overall ===
Competition	Started round	Current position / round	Final position / round	First match	Last match
Football League	—	—	6	31 October	23 May
Promotion play-offs	—	—	3	13 June	30 June
Cup	2nd round	—	4th round	23 November	20 December

Last updated: 30 June 2012

=== Football League ===
==== Classification ====
Pos	Team	Pld	W	D	L	GF	GA	GD	Pts	Promotion or relegation
4	Panachaiki (Note: On 24 October 2011, Panachaiki was docked 5 points for bribing during the 2010–11 Football League 2 season.)	34	20	6	8	55	33	+22	61	Qualification for promotion play-offs
5	Platanias (O, P)	34	17	9	8	41	20	+21	60	Qualification for promotion play-offs
6	AEL Kalloni	34	15	12	7	46	29	+17	57	Qualification for promotion play-offs
7	Panserraikos	34	16	9	9	39	22	+17	57	
8	Pierikos	34	16	7	11	41	30	+11	55	

Source: Football League standings (in Greek)
Rules for classification: 1) points; 2) goal difference; 3) number of goals scored.
(O) Play-off winners; (P) Promoted

==== Results summary ====
Overall								Home						Away					
Pld	W	D	L	GF	GA	GD	Pts	W	D	L	GF	GA	GD	W	D	L	GF	GA	GD
34	15	12	7	46	29	+17	57	10	6	2	27	12	+15	5	6	5	19	17	+2

Last updated: 23 May 2012.
Source: Football League

==== Results by round ====
Round	1	2	3	4	5	6	7	8	9	10	11	12	13	14	15	16	17	18	19	20	21	22	23	24	25	26	27	28	29	30	31	32	33	34
Ground	A	H	A	H	A	H	A	A	H	A	H	A	H	A	H	H	A	H	A	H	A	H	A	H	H	A	H	A	H	A	H	A	A	H
Result	L	D	W	D	D	D	W	D	L	D	W	D	W	L	W	L	L	D	W	D	W	W	L	W	W	L	W	D	W	W	D	W	D	W
Position	14	10	5	7	9	11	9	9	11	11	9	9	7	9	6	11	11	11	9	9	8	7	8	8	8	8	8	7	7	7	7	7	7	6

Source: Football League
A = Away; H = Home; W = Win; D = Draw; L = Loss

=== Promotion play-offs ===
==== Classification^{1} ====
Pos	Team	Pld	W	D	L	GF	GA	GD	Pts	Promotion or relegation
1	Platanias (O, P)	6	3	1	2	7	5	+2	11	Promotion to Super League
2	Kallithea	6	2	2	2	5	6	−1	10	
3	AEL Kalloni	6	2	2	2	5	4	+1	8	
4	Panachaiki	6	2	1	3	7	11	−4	8	

Rules for classification: 1) points; 2) goal difference; 3) number of goals scored.
(O) Play-off winners; (P) Promoted

==== Results summary ====
Overall								Home						Away					
Pld	W	D	L	GF	GA	GD	Pts	W	D	L	GF	GA	GD	W	D	L	GF	GA	GD
6	2	2	2	5	4	+1	8	2	1	0	5	0	+5	0	1	2	0	4	−4

Last updated: 30 June 2012.
Source: Football League

==== Results by round ====
Round	1	2	3	4	5	6
Ground	A	H	A	H	A	H
Result	D	D	L	W	L	W
Position	4	3	4	3	4	3

Source: Football League
A = Away; H = Home; W = Win; D = Draw; L = Loss

== Matches ==
=== Pre-season and friendlies ===
The preparation started on August 3 to AEL Kalloni. The team left on August 11 to Xanthi and one day later to Pravets, Bulgaria, where the basic pre-season preparation took place. They stayed at Pravets until August 22 and continued the preparation in Macedonia and Thrace, giving at the same time friendlies against clubs based there, before they return to Lesbos.

In the interval between the end of summer and the beginning of the championship (31 October 2011), they gave some more friendlies against clubs with long presence in the professional levels of Greek football.

Date	Opponents	H / A	Result F – A	Scorers
14 August 2011	(Bulgaria) V AFG Spartak Pleven	N	3 – 3	Vladimir 2', Manousos (2) 5', 47'
18 August 2011	(Bulgaria) B PFG Slivnishki Geroi	N	2 – 0	dos Santos 45', Triantafyllou 71'
21 August 2011	(Bulgaria) A PFG Minyor Pernik	A	4 – 1	dos Santos (2) 20', 35', Manousos 37' (pen.), Mateo 51'
25 August 2011	(Greece) FL Veria	A	0 – 1	
27 August 2011	(Greece) FL Panthrakikos	A	1 – 1	Triantafyllou 11'
11 September 2011	(Greece) FL Ethnikos Asteras	H	0 – 0	
17 September 2011	(Greece) FL AEL	A	0 – 1	
24 September 2011	(Greece) FL Panserraikos	H	1 – 0	Manousos 83'
8 October 2011	(Greece) FL2 Apollon Kalamarias	H	1 – 1	dos Santos 18'
16 October 2011	(Greece) FL2 Apollon Athens	H	2 – 1	Bibiris (o.g.) 12', dos Santos 57'
22 October 2011	(Greece) SL Panetolikos	A	0 – 1	

=== Football League ===
The fixtures for the 2011–12 season were announced on 3 October.

The championship would start on 15 October, but because of pending court decisions, about last season's match-fixing, in the relevant disciplinary bodies, it was postponed to October 29/30 weekend.

On 30 January to 15 February, the Championship Committee and the Greek Professional Footballers Association decided to go on strike due to the exclusion of the league and the lockout of the players.

31 October 2011 1	Panthrakikos	1 – 0	AEL Kalloni	Komotini
19:00 (UTC+2)	Mingas 49'	Report		Stadium: Komotini Municipal Stadium; Attendance: n/a Referee: Georgios Liachoudis (Macedonia)

6 November 2011 2	AEL Kalloni	2 – 2	Kallithea	Mytilene
15:00 (UTC+2)	Leozinho 57' (pen.); Karakostas 68'	Report	19' Katsikis; 64' (pen.) Kaltsas	Stadium: Municipal Stadium of Mytilene; Attendance: n/a Referee: Aristeidis Vatsios (West Attica)

13 November 2011 3	Thrasyvoulos	0 – 1	AEL Kalloni	Fyli
14:00 (UTC+2)		Report	75' Tarachulski	Stadium: Fyli Stadium; Attendance: n/a Referee: Georgios Kyzas (Drama)

20 November 2011 4	AEL Kalloni	0 – 0	Agrotikos Asteras	Mytilene
14:30 (UTC+2)		Report		Stadium: Municipal Stadium of Mytilene; Attendance: n/a Referee: Efthalia Mitsi (Piraeus)

27 November 2011 5	Fokikos	0 – 0	AEL Kalloni	Amfissa
14:30 (UTC+2)		Report		Stadium: Amfissa Municipal Stadium; Attendance: n/a Referee: Nikolaos Ratsiatos (Argolis)

4 December 2011 6	AEL Kalloni	0 – 0	Iraklis Psachna	Mytilene
15:00 (UTC+2)		Report		Stadium: Municipal Stadium of Mytilene; Attendance: n/a Referee: Georgios Blanas (Messenia)

10 December 2011 7	Panserraikos	2 – 3	AEL Kalloni	Serres
15:00 (UTC+2)	Stefanidis 70' (pen.), 80'	Report	21' Manousakis; 30' Manousos; 37' (pen.) Leozinho	Stadium: Serres Municipal Stadium; Attendance: n/a Referee: Konstantinos Galatsios (Macedonia)

17 December 2011 8	Vyzas	1 – 1	AEL Kalloni	Megara
14:00 (UTC+2)	Iliopoulos 61'	Report	75' Vlastellis	Stadium: Megara Stadium; Attendance: n/a Referee: Iosif Sfakianakis (Athens)

4 January 2012 9	AEL Kalloni	0 – 1	Veria	Mytilene
15:00 (UTC+2)		Report	73' Kadi	Stadium: Municipal Stadium of Mytilene; Attendance: n/a Referee: Athanasios Tzilos (Larissa)

8 January 2012 10	Pierikos	1 – 1	AEL Kalloni	Katerini
15:00 (UTC+2)	Intzoglou 8'	Report	34' Tarachulski	Stadium: Athletic Center I of OACA of Municipality of Katerini; Attendance: n/a Referee: Athanasios Sezos (Kilkis)

14 January 2012 11	AEL Kalloni	1 – 0	AEL	Mytilene
15:00 (UTC+2)	Leozinho 33' (pen.)	Report		Stadium: Municipal Stadium of Mytilene; Attendance: n/a Referee: Apostolos Ambarkiolis (Macedonia)

22 January 2012 12	Ethnikos Asteras	0 – 0	AEL Kalloni	Kaisariani
14:00 (UTC+2)		Report		Stadium: Michalis Kritikopoulos Stadium; Attendance: n/a Referee: Ioannis Mourtzakis (Heraklion)

25 January 2012 13	AEL Kalloni	1 – 0	Anagennisi Epanomi	Mytilene
15:00 (UTC+2)	Marcelo 42'	Report		Stadium: Municipal Stadium of Mytilene; Attendance: n/a Referee: Aristomenis Koutsiaftis (Arta)

29 January 2012 14	Anagennisi Giannitsa	2 – 1	AEL Kalloni	Giannitsa
15:00 (UTC+2)	Spatharas 42'; Seretis 81'	Report	90+1' (pen.) Leozinho	Stadium: Giannitsa Stadium; Attendance: n/a Referee: Georgios Giannoulakis (Chania)

– 15	AEL Kalloni	3 – 0 (w/o)^{1}	Diagoras	–
–		Report		Stadium: – Attendance: – Referee: –

26 February 2012 16	AEL Kalloni	0 – 1	Panachaiki	Mytilene
15:00 (UTC+2)		Report	11' Atmatzidis	Stadium: Municipal Stadium of Mytilene; Attendance: n/a Referee: Chrisovalantis Vrakas (Euboea)

2 March 2012 17	Platanias	3 – 0	AEL Kalloni	Maleme
17:00 (UTC+2)	Mirčeta 2' (pen.); Nazlidis 33'; Maragkoudakis 63'	Report		Stadium: Maleme Stadium; Attendance: n/a Referee: Stavros Mantalos (Athens)

9 March 2012 18	AEL Kalloni	1 – 1	Panthrakikos	Mytilene
17:00 (UTC+2)	Leozinho 43' (pen.)	Report	78' (pen.) Kontogoulidis	Stadium: Municipal Stadium of Mytilene; Attendance: n/a Referee: Aristeidis Vatsios (West Attica)

14 March 2012 19	Kallithea	0 – 3	AEL Kalloni	Kallithea
14:30 (UTC+2)		Report	54' Zouroudis; 71' Manousos; 90' (pen.) Leozinho	Stadium: Grigoris Lambrakis Stadium; Attendance: n/a Referee: Emmanouil Skoulas (Thessaly)

18 March 2012 20	AEL Kalloni	2 – 2	Thrasyvoulos	Mytilene
15:00 (UTC+2)	dos Santos 2'; Manousos 45'	Report	21' Vlachos; 46' D'Acol	Stadium: Municipal Stadium of Mytilene; Attendance: n/a Referee: Angelos Evangelou (Athens)

23 March 2012 21	Agrotikos Asteras	1 – 3	AEL Kalloni	Evosmos
15:00 (UTC+2)	Adjeman-Pamboe 76'	Report	41' Zouroudis; 72' Marcelo; 90+3' Manousos	Stadium: Agrotikos Asteras Ground; Attendance: n/a Referee: Triantafyllos Tikas (Karditsa)

28 March 2012 22	AEL Kalloni	1 – 0	Fokikos	Mytilene
16:00 (UTC+3)	dos Santos 44'	Report		Stadium: Municipal Stadium of Mytilene; Attendance: n/a Referee: Ioannis Kambaxis (Euboea)

1 April 2012 23	Iraklis Psachna	1 – 0	AEL Kalloni	Psachna
14:00 (UTC+3)	Segos 68'	Report		Stadium: Local Stadium of Psachna; Attendance: n/a Referee: Georgios Giannoulakis (Chania)

4 April 2012 24	AEL Kalloni	1 – 0	Panserraikos	Mytilene
15:00 (UTC+3)	Leozinho 42'	Report		Stadium: Municipal Stadium of Mytilene; Attendance: n/a Referee: Iosif Sfakianakis (Athens)

8 April 2012 25	AEL Kalloni	2 – 1	Vyzas	Mytilene
17:00 (UTC+3)	Tarachulski 32'; Marcelo 90+1'	Report	90+2' Petrou	Stadium: Municipal Stadium of Mytilene; Attendance: n/a Referee: Simeon Kosikidis (Athens)

21 April 2012 26	Veria	2 – 0	AEL Kalloni	Veria
19:00 (UTC+3)	Samaras 36'; Kadi 45'	Report		Stadium: Veria Stadium; Attendance: n/a Referee: Evaggelos Kiotzenis (Kavala)

25 April 2012 27	AEL Kalloni	3 – 1	Pierikos	Mytilene
15:30 (UTC+3)	Chorianopoulos 37'; Manousos 44'; Leozinho 66'	Report	80' Eleftheriadis	Stadium: Municipal Stadium of Mytilene; Attendance: n/a Referee: Alexandros Katsikogiannis (Epirus)

29 April 2012 28	AEL	1 – 1	AEL Kalloni	Larissa
16:00 (UTC+3)	Papageorgiou 70'	Report	33' Manousakis	Stadium: AEL FC Arena; Attendance: –^{2} Referee: Georgios Chatzis (West Attica)

– 29	AEL Kalloni	3 – 0 (w/o)^{3}	Ethnikos Asteras	–
–				Stadium: – Attendance: – Referee: –

9 May 2012 30	Anagennisi Epanomi	1 – 4	AEL Kalloni	Epanomi
17:00 (UTC+3)	Kourdakis 66'	Report	28' (pen.), 83' Leozinho; 41' Manousos; 43' dos Santos	Stadium: Nikos Sarafis Stadium; Attendance: n/a Referee: Stavros Mantalos (Athens)

13 May 2012 31	AEL Kalloni	3 – 3	Anagennisi Giannitsa	Mytilene
17:00 (UTC+3)	Manousos 29', 65'; Leozinho 58'	Report	21' Tsiknidis; 27' Baxevanos; 63' (pen.) Iordanidis	Stadium: Municipal Stadium of Mytilene; Attendance: n/a Referee: Efthalia Mitsi (Piraeus)

– 32	Diagoras	0 – 3 (w/o)^{1}	AEL Kalloni	–
–				Stadium: – Attendance: – Referee: –

20 May 2012 33	Panachaiki	1 – 1	AEL Kalloni	Patras
17:00 (UTC+3)	Furtado 79'	Report	45' dos Santos	Stadium: Kostas Davourlis Stadium; Attendance: n/a Referee: Aristomenis Koutsiaftis (Arta)

23 May 2012 34	AEL Kalloni	1 – 0	Platanias	Mytilene
17:00 (UTC+3)	Leozinho 38' (pen.)	Report		Stadium: Municipal Stadium of Mytilene; Attendance: n/a Referee: Apostolos Ambarkiolis (Macedonia)

1. Diagoras have been expelled from the championship, after the Professional Sports Commission's decision of February 16 to revoke the certificate of their participation to 2011–12 Football League.
2. On 20 April 2012, AEL were punished to give one match without spectators in their home because of incidents during the match against Panserraikos on 14 March 2012.
3. Ethnikos Asteras have retired from the league, after they did not play in three matches.

=== Promotion play-offs ===
The tournament began on 13 June.

13 June 2012 1	Kallithea	0 – 0	AEL Kalloni	Kallithea
18:00 (UTC+3)		Report		Stadium: Grigoris Lambrakis Stadium; Attendance: n/a Referee: Georgios Liachoudis (Macedonia)

18 June 2012 2	AEL Kalloni	0 – 0	Platanias	Mytilene
18:00 (UTC+3)		Report		Stadium: Municipal Stadium of Mytilene; Attendance: n/a Referee: Stefanos Mantakis (Imathia)

21 June 2012 3	Panachaiki	1 – 0	AEL Kalloni	Patras
18:00 (UTC+3)	Furtado 27'	Report		Stadium: Kostas Davourlis Stadium; Attendance: n/a Referee: Stavros Mantalos (Athens)

24 June 2012 4	AEL Kalloni	1 – 0	Kallithea	Mytilene
19:00 (UTC+3)	Tarachulski 33'	Report		Stadium: Municipal Stadium of Mytilene; Attendance: n/a Referee: Antonios Valiotis (Larissa)

27 June 2012 5	Platanias	3 – 0	AEL Kalloni	Maleme
20:00 (UTC+3)	Dimitris 20'; Mitsis 47' (o.g.); Martsakis 63'	Report		Stadium: Maleme Stadium; Attendance: n/a Referee: Konstantinos Ioannidis (Argolis)

30 June 2012 6	AEL Kalloni	4 – 0	Panachaiki	Mytilene
19:00 (UTC+3)	Leozinho 3' dos Santos 17'; Vallios 45'; Marcelo 60'	Report		Stadium: Municipal Stadium of Mytilene; Attendance: n/a Referee: Georgios Liachoudis (Macedonia)

=== Cup ===
As second-level team, AEL Kalloni started their route to Cup from the Second Round.

23 November 2011 R2	Glyfada	2 – 2 (a.e.t.) (4 – 5 p)	AEL Kalloni	Ellinikon
14:00 (UTC+2)	Karachalios 49'; Tsamourlidis 115'	Report	74' Kripintiris; 109' Leozinho	Stadium: Helliniko Stadium; Attendance: n/a Referee: Evaggelos Kordolaimis (Piraeus)
	Penalties
	Tsoutsis (penalty missed); Kolotouros (penalty scored); Kazantzis (penalty scored); Tsamourlidis (penalty scored); Petropoulos (penalty missed) ? (penalty scored); Pararas (penalty missed)		(penalty scored) Leozinho; (penalty missed) Manousos; (penalty scored) Kripintiris; (penalty scored) Marcelo; (penalty missed) Manousakis; (penalty scored) Chatzopoulos; (penalty scored) Karakostas

20 December 2011 R4	AEL Kalloni	2 – 3 (a.e.t.)	Panionios	Mytilene
15:00 (UTC+2)	Tziortziopoulos 6'; Manousos 42'	Report	16' Siovas; 51' Schembri; 105' (pen.) Cocalić	Stadium: Municipal Stadium of Mytilene; Attendance: n/a Referee: Ioannis Papadopoulos (Macedonia)

== Players ==
=== Squad statistics ===
No.	Pos.	Name	League			Cup			Total			Discipline	
No.	Pos.	Name	Apps	Goals	Start	Apps	Goals	Start	Apps	Goals	Start	Yellow card	Red card
2	DF	(Greece) Giorgos Sembekos	0	0	0	0	0	0	0	0	0	0	0
4	MF	(Brazil) Bruno Paes	2	0	1	1	0	1	3	0	2	1	0
5	DF	(Mali) Mamary Traoré	20	0	15	1	0	1	21	0	16	8	2
6	MF	(Greece) Michalis Kripintiris (c)	32	0	32	2	1	2	34	1	34	9	0
7	MF	(Greece) Nikos Galas	14	0	8	1	0	1	15	0	9	4	1
9	FW	(Greece) Giorgos Manousos	34	8	33	2	1	1	36	9	34	7	0
10	MF	(Greece) Dimitris Vlastellis	25	1	2	1	0	0	26	1	2	7	0
11	DF	(Greece) Christos Mitsis	24	1	23	0	0	0	24	1	23	4	1
12	MF	(Greece) Giorgos Chorianopoulos	24	1	24	0	0	0	24	1	24	1	0
13	DF	(Greece) Giorgos Chalaris	0	0	0	0	0	0	0	0	0	0	0
14	FW	(Greece) Anthimos Sambanis	4	0	0	0	0	0	4	0	0	0	0
16	FW	(Greece) Anastasios Triantafyllou	10	0	4	2	0	1	12	0	5	0	0
17	FW	(Brazil) Marko dos Santos	28	5	21	2	0	2	30	5	23	3	1
18	MF	(Greece) Charalambos Siligardakis	8	0	5	0	0	0	8	0	5	5	1
19	FW	(Greece) Nikos Makridis	1	0	0	1	0	1	2	0	1	0	0
20	FW	(Poland) Bartosz Tarachulski	25	4	15	0	0	0	25	4	15	3	1
21	FW	(Greece) Giorgos Theos	1	0	0	0	0	0	1	0	0	0	0
22	DF	(Greece) Stathis Provatidis	7	0	0	1	0	0	8	0	0	2	0
23	FW	(Greece) Dimitris Bourous	2	0	0	0	0	0	2	0	0	0	0
24	DF	(Greece) Stavros Tziortziopoulos	13	0	9	1	1	1	14	1	10	2	0
25	DF	(Brazil) Marcelo	37	4	37	2	0	2	39	4	39	6	0
26	MF	(Brazil) Leozinho	35	13	33	2	1	2	37	14	35	5	0
27	DF	(Greece) Serafeim Thymiopoulos	8	0	6	0	0	0	8	0	6	0	0
28	DF	(Greece) Giorgos Karakostas	28	1	28	2	0	2	30	1	30	12	1
29	GK	(Greece) Lefteris Mappas	14	0	14	0	0	0	14	0	14	4	1
30	GK	(Greece) Giorgos Souloganis	24	0	23	1	0	1	25	0	24	3	0
31	MF	(Greece) Nikos Chatzopoulos	26	0	25	2	0	2	28	0	27	13	1
33	FW	(Greece) Dimosthenis Manousakis	35	2	28	2	0	1	37	2	29	5	1
37	MF	(Argentina) Lucas Scaglia	7	0	7	1	0	0	8	0	7	2	0
55	DF	(Greece) Stratis Vallios	4	1	3	0	0	0	4	1	3	0	0
70	DF	(Cape Verde) Konstantinos Lima	1	0	1	0	0	0	1	0	1	0	0
75	GK	(Greece) Christos Pouris	0	0	0	1	0	1	1	0	1	0	0
77	FW	(Greece) Andreas Dambos	1	0	1	0	0	0	1	0	1	0	0
79	FW	(Greece) Petros Zouroudis	19	2	11	0	0	0	19	2	11	2	0
91	GK	(England) Daniel Lloyd-Weston	0	0	0	0	0	0	0	0	0	0	0
92	GK	(Greece) Petros Gomos	0	0	0	0	0	0	0	0	0	0	0
—	—	Own goals	—	1	—	—	0	—	—	1	—	—	—

Statistics accurate as of match played 30 June 2012

=== Transfers ===
==== Summer ====
===== In =====
Pos.	Name	From	Fee
GK	(Greece) Petros Gomos	(Greece) LC Liontarakia Mytilene	Free
GK	(Greece) Christos Pouris	(Greece) FL Trikala	Free
GK	(Greece) Giorgos Souloganis	(Greece) FL Doxa Drama	Free
GK	(England) Daniel Lloyd-Weston	(England) L2 Cheltenham Town	Free
DF	(Greece) Giorgos Karakostas	(Greece) FL Doxa Drama	Free
DF	(Brazil) Marcelo	(Greece) SL Asteras Tripolis	Undisclosed
DF	(Greece) Stathis Provatidis	(Greece) FL Diagoras	Free
DF	(Mali) Mamary Traoré	(Greece) FL Ethnikos Asteras	Undisclosed
DF	(Greece) Stavros Tziortziopoulos	(Greece) DE Fostiras	Free
MF	(Greece) Nikos Chatzopoulos	(Greece) FL Diagoras	Free
MF	(Brazil) Leozinho	(Greece) FL Panserraikos	Free
MF	(Brazil) Bruno Paes	(Brazil) P3 Grêmio Osasco	Free
MF	(Argentina) Lucas Scaglia	(Greece) FL Trikala	Free
FW	(Greece) Andreas Dambos	(Greece) DE Loukisia	Free
FW	(Brazil) Marko dos Santos	(Albania) SL Besa Kavajë	Undisclosed
FW	(Greece) Dimosthenis Manousakis	(Cyprus) 1D Nea Salamis	Free
FW	(Greece) Giorgos Manousos	(Greece) FL OFI	Unknown
FW	(Poland) Bartosz Tarachulski	(Greece) FL Diagoras	Unknown
FW	(Greece) Giorgos Theos	(Greece) FL2 Aias Salamina	Unknown

===== Out =====
Pos.	Name	To	Fee
GK	(Greece) Alexandros Kalaitzidis	(Greece) DE Aiolikos	Free
GK	(Greece) Grigoris Kosmidis	(Greece) FL2 Apollon Kalamaria	Free
DF	(Greece) Giorgos Agiakatsikas	(Greece) DE Aiolikos	Undisclosed
DF	(Greece) Kostas Apostolidis	(Greece) DE Aiolikos	Free
MF	(Greece) Paraskevas Bakalis	(Greece) FL Diagoras	Free
MF	(Greece) Kostas Chatzikyriakos	(Greece) DE Aiolikos	Free
MF	(Greece) Panagiotis Chronis	(Greece) LC Achilleas Petra	Free
MF	(Greece) Vasilis Dakoulas	(Greece) LC Filoktitis Melivoia	Free
MF	(Greece) Giannis Kalogeropoulos	(Greece) DE Kymi	Free
MF	(Greece) Aristeidis Lottas	(Greece) FL2 Paniliakos	Free
MF	(Greece) Nikos Petrouzellis	(Greece) FL2 Kalamata	Free
FW	(Brazil) Luciano de Souza	Unattached	Retired
FW	(Greece) Prokopis Kartalis	Unattached	Retired

==== Winter ====
===== In =====
Date	No.	Pos.	Name	From	Fee
3 January 2012	23	FW	(Greece) Dimitris Bourous	Youth system	Free
3 January 2012	70	DF	(Cape Verde) Konstantinos Lima	Youth system	Free
9 January 2012	12	MF	(Greece) Giorgos Chorianopoulos	(Greece) FL Ethnikos Asteras	Undisclosed
15 January 2012	18	MF	(Greece) Charalambos Siligardakis	(Greece) FL Veria	Undisclosed
18 January 2012	79	FW	(Greece) Petros Zouroudis	(Greece) SL Levadiakos	Free

===== Out =====
Date	No.	Pos.	Name	To	Fee
5 December 2011	75	GK	(Greece) Christos Pouris	(Greece) FL Panachaiki	Free
3 January 2012	21	FW	(Greece) Giorgos Theos	(Greece) FL2 Proodeftiki	Free
3 January 2012	37	MF	(Argentina) Lucas Scaglia	(Bolivia) LFPB Club Bolívar	Free
17 January 2012	13	DF	(Greece) Giorgos Chalaris	(Greece) FL Vyzas	Free
26 January 2012	16	FW	(Greece) Anastasios Triantafyllou	(Greece) FL2 Niki Volos	Free

===== Loaned out =====
Date	No.	Pos.	Name	To	Until
10 January 2012	2	DF	(Greece) Giorgos Sembekos	(Greece) FL Thrasyvoulos	End of season
11 January 2012	19	FW	(Greece) Nikos Makridis	(Greece) FL2 Paniliakos	End of season
