= 2012–13 AEL Kalloni F.C. season =

AEL Kalloni
2012–13 season
- President: (Greece) Nikos Michalakis
- Head coach: (Greece) Babis Tennes
- Stadium: Mytilene Municipal Stadium
- Football League: 3rd (promoted to 2013–14 Super League Greece)
- Greek Cup: 2nd round
- Top goalscorer: League: Giorgos Manousos (14); All: Giorgos Manousos (14)
Home colours	Away colours	Third colours

The 2012–13 season was AEL Kalloni's second season in the Football League, the second tier of the Greek football league system. They promoted to 2013–14 Super League Greece.

== Club ==
=== Coaching staff ===
Position	Staff
Head coach	Babis Tennes
Assistant coach	Giorgos Koltsis
Goalkeeping coach	Vaggelis Filippis
Fitness coach	Pantelis Pantelopoulos

Last updated: 28 January 2013
Source: AEL Kalloni F.C.

=== Kit ===
Supplier:

Home	Away	Third

Last updated: 29 September 2012.
Source: AEL Kalloni F.C.

=== Other information ===
President & Owner	Nikos Michalakis
Vice President I	Kostas Papadopoulos
Vice President II	Stelios Sfakianakis
General Director	Prokopis Kartalis
General Manager	Dimitris Aggelonias
Ground (capacity and dimensions)	Mytilene Municipal Stadium (2,850 / 102x65 metres)

Last updated: 23 April 2013
Source: AEL Kalloni F.C.

== Competitions ==
=== Overall ===
Competition	Started round	Current position / round	Final position / round	First match	Last match
Football League	—	—	3	29 September	26 May
Greek Football Cup	1st round	—	2nd round	24 October	31 October

Last updated: 26 May 2013

=== Football League ===
==== Classification ====
Pos	Team	Pld	W	D	L	GF	GA	GD	Pts	Promotion or relegation
1	Apollon Smyrnis (C, P)	40	22	9	9	50	29	+21	75	Promotion to Super League
2	Ergotelis (P)	40	21	11	8	42	25	+17	74	Promotion to Super League
3	AEL Kalloni (P)	40	20	13	7	48	22	+26	73 (Note: Head-to-head record: AEL Kalloni: 8 pts, Panetolikos: 4 pts, Olympiacos Volos: 3 pts.)	Promotion to Super League
4	Panetolikos (P)	40	20	13	7	55	23	+32	73	Qualification for promotion play-offs
5	Olympiacos Volos	40	19	16	5	49	23	+26	73	Qualification for promotion play-offs

Source: Football League standings
Rules for classification: 1st points; 2nd head-to-head points; 3rd head-to-head goal difference
(C) Champions; (P) Promoted

==== Results summary ====
Overall								Home						Away					
Pld	W	D	L	GF	GA	GD	Pts	W	D	L	GF	GA	GD	W	D	L	GF	GA	GD
40	20	13	7	48	22	+26	73	14	4	2	35	13	+22	6	9	5	13	9	+4

Last updated: 26 May 2013.
Source: Football League

==== Results by round ====
Round	1	2	3	4	5	6	7	8	9	10	11	12	13	14	15	16	17	18	19	20	21	22	23	24	25	26	27	28	29	30	31	32	33	34	35	36	37	38	39	40	41	42
Ground	A	A	H	A	H	—	H	A	H	A	H	H	A	H	A	H	A	H	A	H	A	H	H	A	H	A	—	A	H	A	H	A	A	H	A	H	A	H	A	H	A	H
Result	W	D	W	W	L	—	D	L	L	D	D	W	L	W	D	W	L	W	L	W	D	W	D	D	W	D	—	D	W	D	W	W	L	W	D	W	W	W	W	W	W	D
Position	6	6	2	1	4	6	7	11	13	14	13	10	12	10	10	7	8	7	9	8	9	7	8	9	6	8	9	11	10	10	8	6	7	6	7	7	5	5	5	4	4	3

Source: Football League
A = Away; H = Home; W = Win; D = Draw; L = Loss

== Matches ==
=== Pre-season and friendlies ===
The preparation started on July 23 to Mytilene. The basic pre-season preparation took place to Karpenisi.

Date	Opponents	H / A	Result F – A	Scorers
12 August 2012	Niki Volos	N	0 – 2	
29 August 2012	Panetolikos	H	0 – 0	
1 September 2012	Pierikos	A	0 – 1	
5 September 2012	Anagennisi Epanomi	A	2 – 3	Kotsios 53', Kazakis 72'
12 September 2012	Vyzas	H	5 – 0	Manousos (2) 5', 53' (pen.), González 16', Kazakis 68', Leozinho 86' (pen.)
22 September 2012	Ergotelis	H	1 – 0	González 20'

=== Football League ===
The fixtures for the 2012–13 season were announced on 24 September.

29 September 2012 1	Panetolikos	0–1	AEL Kalloni	Agrinio
17:00 (UTC+3)		Report	85' Manousos	Stadium: Panetolikos Stadium; Attendance: n/a Referee: Anastasios Papapetrou (Athens)

3 October 2012 2	Ethnikos Gazoros	0–0	AEL Kalloni	Serres
16:45 (UTC+3)		Report		Stadium: Serres Municipal Stadium; Attendance: n/a Referee: Alexandros Katsikogiannis (Epirus)

7 October 2012 3	AEL Kalloni	2–0	Panachaiki	Mytilene
16:45 (UTC+3)	Kotsios 64', 81'	Report		Stadium: Mytilene Municipal Stadium; Attendance: n/a Referee: Nikolaos Roussos-Bekertzis (Preveza)

11 October 2012 4	Thrasyvoulos	0–1	AEL Kalloni	Fyli
16:00 (UTC+3)		Report	14' González	Stadium: Fyli Stadium; Attendance: n/a Referee: Nikolaos Anousos (Laconia)

15 October 2012 5	AEL Kalloni	0–2	Niki Volos	Mytilene
16:30 (UTC+3)		Report	30' Fligos; 87' Iacob	Stadium: Mytilene Municipal Stadium; Attendance: n/a Referee: Nikolaos Tevekelis (Macedonia)

5 November 2012 7	AEL Kalloni	0–0	Ergotelis	Mytilene
16:00 (UTC+2)		Report		Stadium: Mytilene Municipal Stadium; Attendance: n/a Referee: Anastasios Papapetrou (Athens)

11 November 2012 8	Iraklis Psachna	1–0	AEL Kalloni	Psachna
15:00 (UTC+2)	Chaikalis 23'	Report		Stadium: Psachna Stadium; Attendance: n/a Referee: Ioannis Mourtzakis (Heraklion)

18 November 2012 9	AEL Kalloni	0–2	Apollon Smyrnis	Mytilene
15:00 (UTC+2)		Report	52' Katsikis; 85' Manias	Stadium: Mytilene Municipal Stadium; Attendance: n/a Referee: Evaggelos Kordolaimis (Piraeus)

21 November 2012 10	Pierikos	1–1	AEL Kalloni	Katerini
15:00 (UTC+2)	Fabinho 42'	Report	38' Leozinho	Stadium: Athletic Center I of OACA of Municipality of Katerini; Attendance: n/a Referee: Dionysios Zougras (Kozani)

25 November 2012 11	AEL Kalloni	1–1	Iraklis	Mytilene
15:00 (UTC+2)	Manousos 39'	Report	23' Stefanidis	Stadium: Mytilene Municipal Stadium; Attendance: n/a Referee: Christos Gkranas (Xanthi)

2 December 2012 12	AEL Kalloni	1–0	Doxa Drama	Mytilene
15:00 (UTC+2)	Manousos 90+2'	Report		Stadium: Mytilene Municipal Stadium; Attendance: n/a Referee: Nikolaos Papageorgiou (Athens)

9 December 2012 13	Kavala	1–0	AEL Kalloni	Kavala
15:00 (UTC+2)	Mokaké 21'	Report		Stadium: Anthi Karagianni Stadium; Attendance: n/a Referee: Isaak Tsakalidis (Chalkidiki)

16 December 2012 14	AEL Kalloni	3–1	Vyzas	Mytilene
15:00 (UTC+2)	Anastasiadis 28'; Manousos 40'; Leozinho 60'	Report	58' Veletis	Stadium: Mytilene Municipal Stadium; Attendance: n/a Referee: Georgios Mastakas (Macedonia)

6 January 2013 15	Fokikos	0–0	AEL Kalloni	Amfissa
15:00 (UTC+2)		Report		Stadium: Amfissa Municipal Stadium; Attendance: n/a Referee: Georgios Blanas (Messenia)

13 January 2013 16	AEL Kalloni	1–0	AEL	Mytilene
15:00 (UTC+2)	Giondis 45'	Report		Stadium: Mytilene Municipal Stadium; Attendance: n/a Referee: Aggelos Aggelakis (Macedonia)

20 January 2013 17	Kallithea	1–0	AEL Kalloni	Kallithea
14:30 (UTC+2)	Piccolo 45+2'	Report		Stadium: Grigoris Lambrakis Stadium; Attendance: n/a Referee: Ioannis Blounas (Phthiotis)

27 January 2013 18	AEL Kalloni	1–0	Panserraikos	Mytilene
15:00 (UTC+2)	Manousos 16'	Report		Stadium: Mytilene Municipal Stadium; Attendance: n/a Referee: Panagiotis Simeonidis (Pieria)

3 February 2013 19	Anagennisi Epanomi	2–1	AEL Kalloni	Epanomi
14:00 (UTC+2)	Silva 29'; Lambropoulos 40' (o.g.)	Report	63' (o.g.) Moysidis	Stadium: Nikos Sarafis Stadium; Attendance: n/a Referee: Panagiotis Koemtzidis (Kozani)

6 February 2013 20	AEL Kalloni	2–0	Anagennisi Giannitsa	Mytilene
15:00 (UTC+2)	Manousos 36'; Dimbala 62'	Report		Stadium: Mytilene Municipal Stadium; Attendance: n/a Referee: Ioannis Kambaxis (Euboea)

10 February 2013 21	Olympiacos Volos	1–1	AEL Kalloni	Volos
15:00 (UTC+2)	Pindonis 50'	Report	90+4' Kandji	Stadium: Panthessaliko Stadium; Attendance: n/a Referee: Georgios Giannoulakis (Chania)

17 February 2013 22	AEL Kalloni	2–0	Panetolikos	Mytilene
15:00 (UTC+2)	Leozinho 16', 31'	Report		Stadium: Mytilene Municipal Stadium; Attendance: n/a Referee: Dimitrios Karantonis (Imathia)

20 February 2013 23	AEL Kalloni	0–0	Ethnikos Gazoros	Mytilene
15:00 (UTC+2)		Report		Stadium: Mytilene Municipal Stadium; Attendance: n/a Referee: Christos Andronikidis (Piraeus)

24 February 2013 24	Panachaiki	0–0	AEL Kalloni	Pyrgos
15:00 (UTC+2)		Report		Stadium: Pyrgos Municipal Stadium; Attendance: n/a Referee: Vasilios Panagiotopoulos (Aetolia-Acarnania)

3 March 2013 25	AEL Kalloni	3–0	Thrasyvoulos	Mytilene
15:00 (UTC+2)	Anastasiadis 26'; Marcelo 48'; Manousos 65'	Report		Stadium: Mytilene Municipal Stadium; Attendance: n/a Referee: Konstantinos Kariofyllis (Piraeus)

10 March 2013 26	Niki Volos	0–0	AEL Kalloni	Volos
15:00 (UTC+2)		Report		Stadium: Panthessaliko Stadium; Attendance: n/a Referee: Nikolaos Papageorgiou (Athens)

17 March 2013 28	Ergotelis	0–0	AEL Kalloni	Heraklion
15:00 (UTC+2)		Report		Stadium: Pankritio Stadium; Attendance: n/a Referee: Spyridon Selimos (Laconia)

24 March 2013 29	AEL Kalloni	2–1	Iraklis Psachna	Mytilene
16:00 (UTC+2)	Kandji 46'; Manousos 69'	Report	90' Barrancos	Stadium: Mytilene Municipal Stadium; Attendance: n/a Referee: Anastasios Papapetrou (Athens)

27 March 2013 30	Apollon Smyrnis	0–0	AEL Kalloni	Rizoupoli
15:00 (UTC+2)		Report		Stadium: Georgios Kamaras Stadium; Attendance: n/a Referee: Alexandros Katsikogiannis (Epirus)

31 March 2013 31	AEL Kalloni	5–2	Pierikos	Mytilene
16:00 (UTC+3)	Vlastellis 14'; Manousakis 23', 78'; Manousos 34' (pen.); Mara 83'	Report	37' Katharios; 61' Iordanidis	Stadium: Mytilene Municipal Stadium; Attendance: n/a Referee: Dimitrios Maloutas (Imathia)

7 April 2013 32	Iraklis	0–1	AEL Kalloni	Thessaloniki
16:00 (UTC+3)		Report	33' Manousos	Stadium: Kaftanzoglio Stadium; Attendance: n/a Referee: Georgios Kyriazidis (Evros)

10 April 2013 33	Doxa Drama	1–0	AEL Kalloni	Drama
16:00 (UTC+3)	Kappel 76'	Report		Stadium: Doxa Drama Stadium; Attendance: n/a Referee: Emmanouil Skoulas (Thessaly)

14 April 2013 34	AEL Kalloni	2–1	Kavala	Mytilene
16:00 (UTC+3)	Manousos 50', 71'	Report	79' Dosis	Stadium: Mytilene Municipal Stadium; Attendance: n/a Referee: Ioannis Sosonis (Phthiotis)

21 April 2013 35	Vyzas	0–0	AEL Kalloni	Megara
15:00 (UTC+3)		Report		Stadium: Megara Stadium; Attendance: n/a Referee: Georgios Foukakis (Heraklion)

24 April 2013 36	AEL Kalloni	3–0	Fokikos	Mytilene
16:00 (UTC+3)	Manousos 3'; Govas 10'; Leozinho 28'	Report		Stadium: Mytilene Municipal Stadium; Attendance: n/a Referee: Symeon Kosikidis (Athens)

28 April 2013 37	AEL	0–1	AEL Kalloni	Larissa
17:00 (UTC+3)		Report	32' Manousos	Stadium: AEL FC Arena; Attendance: n/a Referee: Iosif Sfakianakis (Athens)

11 May 2013 38	AEL Kalloni	2–0	Kallithea	Mytilene
17:00 (UTC+3)	Kandji 74'; Dimbala 89'	Report		Stadium: Mytilene Municipal Stadium; Attendance: n/a Referee: Konstantinos Konstantakis (Achaea)

15 May 2013 39	Panserraikos	1–3	AEL Kalloni	Serres
17:00 (UTC+3)	Kontos 49'	Report	14', 43' Kandji; 75' Galas	Stadium: Serres Municipal Stadium; Attendance: n/a Referee: Anastasios Papapetrou (Athens)

19 May 2013 40	AEL Kalloni	3–1	Anagennisi Epanomi	Mytilene
18:00 (UTC+3)	Kandji 28'; Leozinho 31', 47'	Report	80' Topouzis	Stadium: Mytilene Municipal Stadium; Attendance: n/a Referee: Triantafyllos Tikas (Evrytania)

22 May 2013 41	Anagennisi Giannitsa	0–3	AEL Kalloni	Giannitsa
18:00 (UTC+3)		Report	19' Anastasiadis; 30' Vlastellis; 40' (pen.) Leozinho	Stadium: Giannitsa Stadium; Attendance: n/a Referee: Konstantinos Kariofyllis (Piraeus)

26 May 2013 42	AEL Kalloni	2–2	Olympiacos Volos	Mytilene
18:00 (UTC+3)	Marcelo 42'; Kotsios 83'		31' Pindonis; 67' Stoyanov	Stadium: Mytilene Municipal Stadium; Attendance: n/a Referee: Ioannis Topouzis (Thrace)

=== Cup ===
The fixtures were announced on 13 October.

24 October 2012 First round	Ethnikos Asteras	1–1 (a.e.t.) (1–4 p)	AEL Kalloni	Kaisariani
15:00 UTC+2	Theologou 90'	Report	Leozinho 55'	Stadium: Michalis Kritikopoulos Stadium; Referee: Christos Andronikidis (Piraeus)
	Penalties
	Samios (penalty scored); Kampouris (penalty missed); Nikoletos (penalty missed)		(penalty scored) Marcelo; (penalty scored) Chorianopoulos; (penalty scored) Leozinho; (penalty scored) Manousos

31 October 2012 Second round	Olympiacos Volos	1–1 (a.e.t.) (5–3 p)	AEL Kalloni	Volos
18:00 (UTC+2)	Gogolos 53'	Report	Leozinho 23'	Stadium: Panthessaliko Stadium; Referee: Angelos Evangelou (Athens)
	Penalties
	Oyarbide (penalty scored); Añete (penalty scored); Bolatti (penalty scored); Stoyanov (penalty scored); Yenga (penalty scored)		(penalty scored) Kripintiris; (penalty missed) Marcelo; (penalty scored) Leozinho; (penalty scored) Chorianopoulos

== Players ==
=== Squad statistics ===
No.	Pos.	Name	League			Cup			Total			Discipline	
No.	Pos.	Name	Apps	Goals	Start	Apps	Goals	Start	Apps	Goals	Start	Yellow card	Red card
4	DF	(Greece) Ilias Kotsios	32	3	30	1	0	1	33	3	31	8	1
5	DF	(Mali) Mamary Traoré	1	0	0	0	0	0	1	0	0	0	0
5	DF	(Spain) Nacho Neira	1	0	1	0	0	0	1	0	1	0	0
6	MF	(Greece) Michalis Kripintiris	29	0	16	1	0	1	30	0	17	6	0
7	MF	(Greece) Nikos Galas	27	1	11	1	0	0	28	1	11	1	0
9	FW	(Greece) Giorgos Manousos (c)	37	14	36	2	0	2	39	14	38	7	0
10	MF	(Spain) Toni González	14	1	11	0	0	0	14	1	11	2	1
11	FW	(Greece) Dimosthenis Manousakis	19	2	6	1	0	1	20	2	7	2	0
12	MF	(Greece) Giorgos Chorianopoulos	33	0	32	2	0	2	35	0	34	12	0
14	DF	(Greece) Anestis Anastasiadis	37	3	37	2	0	1	39	3	38	3	0
16	FW	(Belarus) Vyacheslav Hleb	3	0	0	0	0	0	3	0	0	0	0
19	DF	(Croatia) Ivica Majstorović	12	0	12	2	0	2	14	0	14	2	0
20	DF	(Algeria) Walid Cherfa	23	0	19	2	0	2	25	0	21	4	0
21	MF	(Greece) Dimitris Vlastellis	13	2	3	0	0	0	13	2	3	1	0
22	MF	(Greece) Charalambos Siligardakis	33	0	29	2	0	2	35	0	31	12	2
23	FW	(Spain) Mara	9	1	3	0	0	0	9	1	3	0	0
24	GK	(Austria) Helge Payer	3	0	3	1	0	1	4	0	4	0	0
25	MF	(Brazil) Marcelo	37	2	36	2	0	2	39	2	38	5	0
26	MF	(Brazil) Leozinho	37	8	36	2	2	2	39	10	38	8	0
29	GK	(Greece) Lefteris Mappas	19	0	19	1	0	1	20	0	20	3	0
30	FW	(Greece) Andreas Govas	19	1	8	2	0	1	21	1	9	1	0
31	DF	(Greece) Nikos Chatzopoulos	1	0	0	0	0	0	1	0	0	0	0
33	FW	(Greece) Antonis Giondis	12	1	4	1	0	0	13	1	4	2	0
34	FW	(Greece) Vlasis Kazakis	9	0	9	2	0	2	11	0	11	4	1
39	FW	(Democratic Republic of the Congo) Patrick Dimbala	24	2	21	0	0	0	24	2	21	1	0
55	DF	(Greece) Stratis Vallios	9	0	4	0	0	0	9	0	4	0	0
77	MF	(Greece) Andreas Dambos	3	0	0	0	0	0	3	0	0	1	0
81	DF	(Greece) Iosif Lambropoulos	22	(1)	21	1	0	1	23	(1)	22	0	0
87	GK	(Greece) Giannis Siderakis	18	0	18	0	0	0	18	0	18	0	0
92	GK	(Greece) Petros Gomos	0	0	0	0	0	0	0	0	0	0	0
99	FW	(Senegal) Macoumba Kandji	19	6	17	0	0	0	19	6	17	5	0
—	—	Own goals	—	1	—	—	0	—	—	1	—	—	—

Statistics accurate as of match played 26 May 2013

=== Transfers ===
==== Summer ====
===== In =====
Date	Pos.	Name	From	Fee
17 July 2012	FW	(Greece) Antonis Giondis	Anagennisi Giannitsa	Free
1 August 2012	DF	(Greece) Ilias Kotsios	PAS Giannina	Free
1 August 2012	MF	(Spain) Toni González	AEL	Free
9 August 2012	DF	(Algeria) Walid Cherfa	MC Alger	Free
15 August 2012	FW	(Greece) Vlasis Kazakis	Skoda Xanthi	Free
22 August 2012	DF	(Greece) Iosif Lambropoulos	Niki Volos	Unknown
22 August 2012	DF	(Greece) Anestis Anastasiadis	Panetolikos	Free
24 August 2012	GK	(Austria) Helge Payer	Rapid Wien	Free
7 September 2012	FW	(Belarus) Vyacheslav Hleb	Gomel	Free
16 September 2012	MF	(Greece) Andreas Govas	Troyes	Free
9 October 2012	DF	(Croatia) Ivica Majstorović	Kerkyra	Free

===== Out =====
Date	Pos.	Name	To	Fee
1 July 2012	MF	(Brazil) Bruno Paes	Unattached (Released)	
1 July 2012	FW	(Greece) Nikos Makridis	Ermionida Kranidi	Free
1 July 2012	FW	(Poland) Bartosz Tarachulski	Retired	
1 July 2012	DF	(Greece) Stavros Tziortziopoulos	Thrasyvoulos	Free
1 July 2012	FW	(Greece) Petros Zouroudis	AEL	Free
4 July 2012	GK	(England) Daniel Lloyd-Weston	Leek Town	Free
4 July 2012	DF	(Greece) Giorgos Sembekos	Kallithea	Free
6 July 2012	DF	(Greece) Giorgos Karakostas	Panserraikos	Free
24 July 2012	DF	(Greece) Christos Mitsis	Niki Volos	Unknown
25 July 2012	FW	(Greece) Anthimos Sambanis	Korinthos	Unknown
28 July 2012	DF	(Greece) Stathis Provatidis	Thrasyvoulos	Free
30 July 2012	GK	(Greece) Giorgos Souloganis	Kavala	Free
5 August 2012	FW	(Brazil) Marko dos Santos	Kavala	Free
5 August 2012	DF	(Greece) Serafeim Thymiopoulos	Odysseas Kordelio	Free

==== Winter ====
===== In =====
Date	Pos.	Name	From	Fee
8 January 2013	FW	(Democratic Republic of the Congo) Patrick Dimbala	Panetolikos	Free
28 January 2013	FW	(Senegal) Macoumba Kandji	Houston Dynamo	Unknown
31 January 2013	FW	(Spain) Mara	Orihuela	Unknown
31 January 2013	DF	(Spain) Nacho Neira	Gimnástica Torrelavega	Unknown
12 February 2013	GK	(Greece) Giannis Siderakis	Panionios	Unknown

===== Loaned in =====
Date	Pos.	Name	From	Duration
21 January 2013	GK	(Greece) Fotis Karagiolidis	Atromitos	Ended

===== Out =====
Date	Pos.	Name	To	Fee
9 January 2013	DF	(Mali) Mamary Traoré	Unattached (Released)	
22 January 2013	DF	(Greece) Nikos Chatzopoulos	Kallithea	Free
25 January 2013	FW	(Belarus) Vyacheslav Hleb	Torpedo-BelAZ Zhodino	Free
28 January 2013	DF	(Croatia) Ivica Majstorović	Mattersburg	Unknown
31 January 2013	GK	(Austria) Helge Payer	Unattached (Released)	
