= 2011–12 Football League (Greece) =

Football League
- Season: 2011–12
- Dates: 29 October 2011 – 23 May 2012
- Champions: Panthrakikos
- Promoted: Panthrakikos; Veria; Platanias
- Relegated: Agrotikos Asteras; Ethnikos Asteras; Diagoras Rodos
- Matches: 306
- Goals: 652 (2.13 per match)
- Biggest home win: Anagennisi Epanomi 6–0 Diagoras Rodos
- Biggest away win: Anagennisi Epanomi 0–5 Kallithea
- Highest scoring: Anagennisi Epanomi 6-1 Panachaiki; Kallithea 5–2 Panachaiki; AEL 5–2 Anagennisi Epanomi; Thrasyvoulos 4-3 Fokikos

The Football League is the second division of the professional football system of Greece. The 2011–12 Football League was held for the second year under the name Football League after previously being known as Beta Ethniki.

The regular season began late, on 29 October, due to the Koriopolis scandal and the relegation of five teams for various offences. Promotion play-offs are scheduled to take place immediately afterwards, while the relegation play-outs were abolished by decision of 8 December 2011.

== Teams ==
A total of three teams gained promotion to the 2011–12 Super League after the 2010–11 Football League season. Champions Panetolikos and runners-up PAS Giannina were directly promoted, and the remaining spot was taken by promotion play-off group winners OFI. The teams that replaced the three promoted teams were initially Iraklis, after it was found guilty of forgery during the winter transfer window, AEL and Panserraikos. Later however, Iraklis got stripped from its professional licence and got relegated to the Delta Ethniki. Also, Levadiakos and Doxa Drama gained promotion to the 2011–12 Super League to take the place of Olympiacos Volos and Kavala which were relegated due to Koriopolis scandal. For the same scandal Panachaiki were docked five points on 24 October 2011.

On the bottom end of the table, Ethnikos Piraeus, Ionikos, Anagennisi Karditsa and Trikala were demoted to the 2011–12 Delta Ethniki after having been found guilty of forgery during the winter transfer window. Ilioupoli was found guilty of match-fixing, so it was automatically put at the end of the league table and demoted to the Football League 2. The relegated teams were replaced by 2010–11 Football League 2 South champions Panachaiki, North champions Anagennisi Epanomi, South runner-up Vyzas, North runner-up AEL Kalloni, Iraklis Psachna, Fokikos, Platanias and Anagennisi Giannitsa.

Location of teams in 2011–12 Football League

| Team | Location | Last season |
|---|---|---|
| AEL | Larissa | SL, 14th |
| AEL Kalloni | Kalloni | FL2 North, 2nd |
| Agrotikos Asteras | Thessaloniki | 10th |
| Anagennisi Epanomi | Epanomi | FL2 North, 1st |
| Anagennisi Giannitsa | Giannitsa | FL2 North, 4th |
| Diagoras | Rhodes | 6th |
| Ethnikos Asteras | Athens | 11th |
| Fokikos | Amfissa | FL2 North, 3rd |
| Iraklis Psachna | Psachna | FL2 South, 3rd |
| Kallithea | Kallithea | 13th |
| Panachaiki | Patras | FL2 South, 1st |
| Panserraikos | Serres | SL, 15th |
| Panthrakikos | Komotini | 7th |
| Pierikos | Katerini | 9th |
| Platanias | Platanias | FL2 South, 5th |
| Thrasyvoulos | Fyli | 12th |
| Veria | Veria | 8th |
| Vyzas | Megara | FL2 South, 2nd |

== League table ==
| Pos | Team | Pld | W | D | L | GF | GA | GD | Pts | Promotion or relegation |
|---|---|---|---|---|---|---|---|---|---|---|
| 1 | Panthrakikos (C, P) | 34 | 22 | 7 | 5 | 49 | 16 | +33 | 73 | Promotion to Super League |
| 2 | Veria (P) | 34 | 22 | 6 | 6 | 56 | 19 | +37 | 72 | Promotion to Super League |
| 3 | Kallithea | 34 | 19 | 7 | 8 | 58 | 32 | +26 | 64 | Qualification for promotion play-offs |
| 4 | Panachaiki (Note: On 24 October 2011, Panachaiki was docked 5 points for bribing during the 2010–11 Football League 2 season.) | 34 | 20 | 6 | 8 | 55 | 33 | +22 | 61 | Qualification for promotion play-offs |
| 5 | Platanias (O, P) | 34 | 17 | 9 | 8 | 41 | 20 | +21 | 60 | Qualification for promotion play-offs |
| 6 | AEL Kalloni | 34 | 15 | 12 | 7 | 46 | 29 | +17 | 57 | Qualification for promotion play-offs |
| 7 | Panserraikos | 34 | 16 | 9 | 9 | 39 | 22 | +17 | 57 | |
| 8 | Pierikos | 34 | 16 | 7 | 11 | 41 | 30 | +11 | 55 | |
| 9 | Anagennisi Epanomi | 34 | 13 | 5 | 16 | 42 | 46 | −4 | 44 | |
| 10 | AEL | 34 | 11 | 10 | 13 | 38 | 29 | +9 | 43 | |
| 11 | Iraklis Psachna | 34 | 10 | 12 | 12 | 29 | 23 | +6 | 42 | |
| 12 | Thrasyvoulos | 34 | 11 | 9 | 14 | 37 | 40 | −3 | 42 | |
| 13 | Anagennisi Giannitsa | 34 | 10 | 9 | 15 | 29 | 44 | −15 | 39 | |
| 14 | Fokikos | 34 | 8 | 11 | 15 | 27 | 38 | −11 | 35 | |
| 15 | Vyzas | 34 | 9 | 7 | 18 | 24 | 42 | −18 | 34 | |
| 16 | Agrotikos Asteras (R) | 34 | 9 | 7 | 18 | 24 | 41 | −17 | 34 | Relegation to Delta Ethniki |
| 17 | Ethnikos Asteras (Note: On 29 December 2011, Ethnikos Asteras was docked 3 points because of the suspension of the Greek Cup match against PAOK with fault of their fans on 21 December.) (R) | 34 | 5 | 9 | 20 | 14 | 62 | −48 | 21 | Relegation to Football League 2 |
| 18 | Diagoras (Note: Diagoras Rodos was docked 2 points.) (R) | 34 | 1 | 2 | 31 | 3 | 86 | −83 | 3 | Relegation to Delta Ethniki (Note: On 16 February 2012, Diagoras was expelled from the championship by the Greek Professional Sports Committee.) |

Source: Football League standings (in Greek)
Rules for classification: 1) points; 2) goal difference; 3) number of goals scored.
(C) Champions; (O) Play-off winners; (P) Promoted; (R) Relegated

== Results ==
| Home \ Away | AEL | AGR | ANE | AGN | DIA | ETA | FOK | IPS | KLT | KAL | PCK | PSE | PTH | PIE | PLA | THR | VER | VYZ |
|---|---|---|---|---|---|---|---|---|---|---|---|---|---|---|---|---|---|---|
| AEL | | 4–1 | 5–2 | 4–1 | 1–0 | 2–0 | 0–0 | 0–0 | 0–1 | 1–1 | 2–1 | 0–1 | 3–2 | 0–0 | 0–1 | 2–1 | 2–2 | 0–0 |
| Agrotikos Asteras | 1–0 | | 1–2 | 1–1 | 1–0 | 3–0 | 1–1 | 2–0 | 1–0 | 1–3 | 1–2 | 1–0 | 0–0 | 0–2 | 0–1 | 0–0 | 1–2 | 1–2 |
| Anagennisi Epanomi | 1–0 | 1–0 | | 1–2 | 6–0 | 0–0 | 1–1 | 1–0 | 0–5 | 1–4 | 6–1 | 0–1 | 0–2 | 2–0 | 0–0 | 3–1 | 0–2 | 3–1 |
| Anagennisi Giannitsa | 0–3 | 1–0 | 0–1 | | 3–0 | 3–0 | 0–1 | 0–0 | 2–3 | 2–1 | 0–0 | 1–1 | 2–2 | 0–3 | 2–1 | 0–0 | 0–2 | 0–1 |
| Diagoras | 0–3 | 0–3 | 0–3 | 0–0 | | 0–3 | 2–2 | 0–3 | 0–3 | 0–3 | 0–4 | 0–3 | 0–3 | 0–2 | 0–3 | 1–0 | 0–3 | 0–1 |
| Ethnikos Asteras | 0–0 | 0–0 | 0–3 | 0–0 | 0–0 | | 2–0 | 0–2 | 0–3 | 0–0 | 1–1 | 0–1 | 0–2 | 0–3 | 0–3 | 0–3 | 2–1 | 0–3 |
| Fokikos | 2–0 | 0–1 | 0–0 | 0–1 | 3–0 | 1–1 | | 2–0 | 2–0 | 0–0 | 0–2 | 1–0 | 0–1 | 0–2 | 1–1 | 2–0 | 1–2 | 1–0 |
| Iraklis Psachna | 0–0 | 1–0 | 1–0 | 1–2 | 2–0 | 0–0 | 3–0 | | 2–2 | 1–0 | 1–3 | 0–0 | 0–0 | 4–0 | 0–0 | 3–1 | 0–1 | 3–0 |
| Kallithea | 1–0 | 4–0 | 4–1 | 1–0 | 1–0 | 2–0 | 3–0 | 2–1 | | 0–3 | 5–2 | 1–0 | 3–0 | 0–0 | 1–1 | 2–1 | 1–1 | 3–0 |
| AEL Kalloni | 1–0 | 0–0 | 1–0 | 3–3 | 3–0 | 3–0 | 1–0 | 0–0 | 2–2 | | 0–1 | 1–0 | 1–1 | 3–1 | 1–0 | 2–2 | 0–1 | 2–1 |
| Panachaiki | 2–0 | 2–1 | 3–0 | 2–0 | 3–0 | 3–0 | 3–1 | 1–0 | 2–1 | 1–1 | | 1–1 | 2–1 | 0–0 | 0–1 | 4–1 | 0–0 | 1–0 |
| Panserraikos | 2–1 | 3–0 | 3–1 | 1–0 | 1–0 | 4–0 | 2–0 | 1–0 | 1–1 | 2–3 | 3–1 | | 0–0 | 1–2 | 1–0 | 1–2 | 1–0 | 1–1 |
| Panthrakikos | 1–0 | 2–0 | 2–0 | 4–1 | 3–0 | 3–0 | 1–0 | 1–0 | 3–0 | 1–0 | 1–0 | 1–0 | | 2–1 | 1–0 | 3–1 | 0–0 | 4–0 |
| Pierikos | 2–1 | 2–0 | 1–2 | 1–0 | 3–0 | 0–0 | 2–2 | 1–0 | 1–0 | 1–1 | 2–0 | 0–0 | 0–1 | | 0–2 | 1–2 | 1–3 | 2–0 |
| Platanias | 0–0 | 0–0 | 1–0 | 3–0 | 3–0 | 3–0 | 2–0 | 0–0 | 1–2 | 3–0 | 0–2 | 1–1 | 1–0 | 1–0 | | 2–0 | 1–0 | 3–0 |
| Thrasyvoulos | 1–1 | 0–1 | 2–1 | 0–1 | 3–0 | 5–0 | 4–3 | 0–0 | 0–0 | 0–1 | 1–3 | 1–0 | 0–0 | 2–1 | 1–1 | | 1–0 | 1–0 |
| Veria | 0–3 | 3–0 | 2–0 | 3–0 | 2–0 | 5–0 | 0–0 | 2–0 | 3–0 | 2–0 | 2–1 | 1–1 | 1–0 | 0–2 | 5–0 | 1–0 | | 1–0 |
| Vyzas | 1–0 | 2–1 | 0–0 | 0–1 | 3–0 | 0–2 | 0–0 | 1–1 | 2–1 | 1–1 | 0–1 | 0–1 | 0–1 | 1–2 | 2–1 | 0–0 | 1–3 | |

Source: Football League matchdays (in Greek)
Legend: Blue = home team win; Yellow = draw; Red = away team win.

== Promotion play-offs ==
The promotion play-offs will comprise the teams ranked 3rd through 6th during the regular season, and they are scheduled to take place immediately after the conclusion of the regular season.

| Pos | Team | Pld | W | D | L | GF | GA | GD | Pts | Promotion or relegation | PLA | KLT | KAL | PCK |
|---|---|---|---|---|---|---|---|---|---|---|---|---|---|---|
| 1 | Platanias (O, P) | 6 | 3 | 1 | 2 | 7 | 5 | +2 | 11 | Promotion to Super League | | 0–1 | 3–0 | 1–0 |
| 2 | Kallithea | 6 | 2 | 2 | 2 | 5 | 6 | −1 | 10 | | 2–0 | | 0–0 | 2–2 |
| 3 | AEL Kalloni | 6 | 2 | 2 | 2 | 5 | 4 | +1 | 8 | | 0–0 | 1–0 | | 4–0 |
| 4 | Panachaiki | 6 | 2 | 1 | 3 | 7 | 11 | −4 | 8 | | 2–3 | 2–1 | 1–0 | |

Legend: Blue = home team win; Yellow = draw; Red = away team win.
Rules for classification: 1) points; 2) goal difference; 3) number of goals scored.
(O) Play-off winners; (P) Promoted

== Top scorers ==
| Rank | Player | Club | Goals |
|---|---|---|---|
| 1 | (Cape Verde) Furtado | Panachaiki | 22 |
| 2 | (South Africa) Calvin Kadi | Veria | 19 |
| 3 | (Greece) Christos Koutsospyros | Pierikos | 12 |
| 3 | (Brazil) Leozinho | AEL Kalloni | 12 |
| 5 | (Brazil) Alexandre D'Acol | Kallithea / Thrasyvoulos | 11 |
| 6 | (Guinea) Sambégou Bangoura | Panserraikos | 10 |
| 6 | (Greece) Giannis Katsaros | Kallithea | 10 |
| 6 | (Greece) Markos Maragoudakis | Platanias | 10 |
| 9 | (Greece) Giannis Gesios | Anagennisi Epanomi | 8 |
| 9 | (Greece) Giorgos Manousos | AEL Kalloni | 8 |

Updated to games played on 16 May 2012.
