= Petros Dhalambekis =

Greek football player

Petros Ntalambekis
Personal information
- Full name: Petros Ntalambekis
- Date of birth: 25 August 1979 (age 47)
- Place of birth: Mytilene, Greece
- Height: 1.94 m (6 ft 4 in)
- Position: Striker

Team information
- Current team: Aiolikos
- Number: 19

Senior career*
Years	Team	Apps	(Gls)
n/a–n/a	Pallesviakos	n/a (n/a)	
n/a–n/a	Ermis Pamfila	n/a (n/a)	
n/a–n/a	Atromitos Aghia Marina	n/a (n/a)	
n/a–n/a	A.E.L. Kalloni	n/a (n/a)	
n/a–n/a	Aiolikos	n/a (n/a)	
n/a–n/a	Rouf	n/a (n/a)	
2007–2008	Aiolikos	22	(3)
- * Club domestic league appearances and goals

Petros Ntalambekis (born 25 August 1979) is a Greek football player who plays for Aiolikos.

Ntalabekis played for Aiolikos during their last spell in the Gamma Ethniki.
