= Marcelo Goianira =

Brazilian footballer

Personal information
- Full name: Marcelo Rodrigues Alves
- Date of birth: August 6, 1980 (age 46)
- Place of birth: Goiânia, Brazil
- Height: 1.72 m (5 ft 7 1/2 in)
- Position: Defensive midfielder

Team information
- Current team: AEL Kalloni
- Number: 18

Youth career
- Goiatuba

Senior career*
Years	Team	Apps	(Gls)
2003–2004	Goiatuba	12	(1)
2004–2005	Palmas	22	(2)
2005–2006	Rioverdense	18	(0)
2006–2007	Esportiva Gama	21	(2)
2007	Grêmio	14	(3)
2007–2009	Amadora	34	(1)
2009–2011	Panthrakikos	36	(1)
2011	Asteras Tripolis	5	(0)
2011–2014	AEL Kalloni	99	(10)
2015–	AEL Kalloni	5	(0)
- * Club domestic league appearances and goals as of November 26, 2011

Marcelo Rodrigues Alves, known as Marcelo Goianira (born August 6, 1980) is a Brazilian footballer who plays as a defensive midfielder in AEL Kalloni of Super League Greece.

== Career ==
season	club	league	Championship		Nation cup		Europe cup		Total	
season	club	league	appear	goals	appear	goals	appear	goals	appear	goals
2003	Goiatuba	Goiano								
2004	Palmas	Tocantinense								
2005	Rioverdense									
2006	Esportiva Gama	Brasileiro C								
2007	Grêmio									
2007–08	Amadora	Liga A	9	0					9	0
2008–09	Amadora	Liga A	25	1					25	1
2009–10	Panthrakikos	Super League Greece	25	0	0	0	0	0	25	0
2010–11	Panthrakikos	Beta Ethniki	16	1	1	0			17	1
2010–11	Asteras Tripolis	Super League Greece	4	0	0	0	0	0	4	0
2011-12	AEL Kalloni	Beta Ethniki	36	3	1	0			37	0
career total			79	2	1	0	0	0	80	2

Last update: 26 Nov 2010
