= Michalis Kripintiris =

Greek footballer

Personal information
- Full name: Michail Kripintiris
- Date of birth: 8 March 1981 (age 45)
- Place of birth: Mytilene, Greece
- Height: 1.80 m (5 ft 11 in)
- Position: Midfielder

Senior career*
Years	Team	Apps	(Gls)
1998–1999	Aiolikos		
2004–2005	Keratsini		
2005–2007	Chaidari	16	(0)
2007–2009	Atromitos	29	(1)
2009–2011	Ethnikos Asteras	43	(2)
2011–2018	AEL Kalloni	61	(0)
2020–2023	Aetos Loutron	0	(0)
- * Club domestic league appearances and goals

Michalis Kripintiris (Greek: Μιχάλης Κριπιντίρης; born 8 March 1981) is a Greek footballer. He plays for Diagoras Agia Paraskevi F.C.

== Career ==
Kripintiris previously played for Chaidari, Atromitos and Ethnikos Asteras in the Super League Greece.
