= Giorgos Manousos =

Greek footballer

Personal information
- Full name: Georgios Manousos
- Date of birth: 3 December 1987 (age 38)
- Place of birth: Mytilene, Greece
- Height: 1.78 m (5 ft 10 in)
- Positions: Forward; winger

Team information
- Current team: Diagoras Agia Paraskevi (manager)

Senior career*
Years	Team	Apps	(Gls)
2001–2003	Pallesviakos	50	(11)
2003–2004	Dafni Mesagrou	29	(18)
2004–2005	Atromitos Agia Marina	30	(7)
2005–2008	Aiolikos	65	(16)
2008–2011	OFI	37	(6)
2011–2016	AEL Kalloni	158	(36)
2016–2017	Platanias	30	(9)
2017–2021	Atromitos	97	(32)
2021–2023	Lamia	59	(9)
2023–2024	Aiolikos	12	(2)
2024–2025	Aetos Loutra		

Managerial career
- 2024–2025: Aetos Loutra (player-coach)
- 2025–: Diagoras Agia Paraskevi
- * Club domestic league appearances and goals as of 13 May 2023

Giorgos Manousos (Greek: Γιώργος Μανούσος; born 3 December 1987) is a Greek former professional footballer who played as a forward and football manager who is currently the manager of Gamma Ethniki club Diagoras Agia Paraskevi.

== Career ==
Born in Mytilene, Manousos began playing football with local side Aiolikos in the Football League 2. In the summer of 2008 he joined OFI and he made his debut in the Super League Greece on 4 October 2008 against AEL. On 30 October 2011 he made his debut for AEL Kalloni After five years with the club, Manousos attracts the interest of Atromitos which are interested in signing 28-year-old striker after his announcement that is intended to leave his current club at the end of season.

In April 2016, Manousos announced his intention to leave AEL Kalloni, which suffered relegation to Football League, at the end of the current season and two Super League Greece's clubs are already monitoring his case. Asteras Tripolis and Platanias are interested in signing the 28-year-old striker, who has scored 14 times in 101 Super League Greece career appearances and was the first scorer of AEL Kalloni in this season's Super League (6 goals in 28 performances). He left the club having 169 appearances (40 goals, 9 assists) in all competitions. Eventually on 8 June 2016, Manousos signed with Platanias a two-year contract for an undisclosed fee, returning to Crete after 5 years. On 3 May 2017, Giorgos Manousos will be released from Platanias immediately, after his controversial interview. The 30-year-old player stated that nothing happened in the locker rooms of Karaiskaki Stadium during the halftime of recent Super League Greece game against Olympiacos, in spite of his teammates' (such as Alexis Apostolopoulos) official statements about violent behavior from the Reds, so the president of Cretan club Manolis Mathioudakis told him during 1 May training that he should be ashamed of yourself for that interview.

=== Atromitos ===
On 27 May 2017, Atromitos announced the signing of Manousos on a two-year deal. On 4 November 2017 Atromitos faced Panionios and the striker was the recipient of a nasty knee injury. This injury was grossly underestimated by both the player and club alike as the plan was to return to playing action as soon as possible, but the pains did not disappear. This led to Manousos undergoing knee surgery in February 2018 and missing the remainder of the 2017–18 season.

On the beginning of the 2018–19 season, has a positive impact in his club's effort in qualifying in the UEFA Europa League third round, but besides his goals both abroad and home did not succeed to help his club to overpass Dynamo Brest. On 3 February 2019, Manousos who returned to the side after a lengthy spell out injured since 1 December, scored with a superb left-footed shot which left AEL's goalkeeper Ögmundur Kristinsson no chance in the 89th minute, sealing a vital 1–0 away win. It was his first goal with the club for the 2018–19 season.

On 14 April 2019, he scored with a powerful header, after an assist from Efthymis Koulouris helping his club achieve a fourth-placed finish in the 2018–19 Super League season with an impressive 2–0 away win over rivals Aris at the Kleanthis Vikelidis Stadium.

On the beginning of the 2019–20 season, he helped his club to escape with a 2–1 away win against Dunajska Streda as he scored the second goal.

The same scenario took place in the second match as Manousos with a penalty kick in the UEFA Europa League third qualifying round scored helping his club to acquire a thrilling 3–2 home win over Dunajska Streda at the Peristeri Stadium which gave the Athens club a 5–3 aggregate success. At the beginning of the season, the experienced striker who has been plagued by injuries himself, stepped up when his team needed him most. On 28 September 2019, he scored a brace in the 2–0 home win over rock-bottom Panetolikos to help his club acquiring his first win for the season. He has scored nine goals over the past two seasons and seven of those goals came in victories, while the other two came in UEFA Europa League qualifying. On 4 January 2020, Manousos slotted home a 90th-minute penalty to seal a tightly contested 2–1 home win for Atromitos over strugglers Asteras Tripolis game. The penalty was Manousos' second goal in the match, with the Greek striker having also put Atromitos ahead in the 76th minute. It was named Man of the match. He has already surpassed his best goal-scoring tally of the season (his previous best was eight goals with Platanias in the 2016–17 season). On 4 June 2021, after fours years with Atromitos, the 33-year-old striker's contract expired, but was not renewed, and the club released him with a farewell video with some of his goals. Manousos made 97 appearances (32 goals, 4 assists) with the club in all competitions.

=== Lamia ===
On 15 June 2021, Lamia announced him as a new signing, with a two-year contract. On 29 January 2022, he scored a brace sealing a vital 2–1 home win game against OFI

== Career statistics ==
As of 30 June 2022

Club	Season	League			Cup		Continental		Other		Total	
Club	Season	Division	Apps	Goals	Apps	Goals	Apps	Goals	Apps	Goals	Apps	Goals
OFI	2008–09	Super League Greece	14	0	0	0	—		—		14	0
OFI	2009–10	Super League Greece 2	12	2	2	2	—		—		14	4
OFI	2010–11	Super League Greece	8	2	1	0	—		—		9	2
OFI	Total		34	4	3	2	—		—		37	6
AEL Kalloni	2011–12	Gamma Ethniki	34	8	2	1	—		—		36	9
AEL Kalloni	2012–13	Football League	37	14	1	0	—		—		38	14
AEL Kalloni	2013–14	Super League Greece	30	5	2	1	—		—		32	6
AEL Kalloni	2014–15	Super League Greece	28	3	3	1	—		—		31	4
AEL Kalloni	2015–16	Super League Greece	29	6	3	1	—		—		32	7
AEL Kalloni	Total		158	36	11	4	—		—		169	40
Platanias	2016–17	Super League Greece	26	8	4	1	—		—		30	9
Atromitos	2017–18	Super League Greece	9	2	2	1	—		—		11	3
Atromitos	2018–19	Super League Greece	15	2	3	1	2	2	—		20	5
Atromitos	2019–20	Super League Greece	31	14	2	0	4	2	—		37	16
Atromitos	2020–21	Super League Greece	28	8	1	0	—		—		29	8
Atromitos	Total		83	26	8	2	6	4	—		97	32
Lamia	2021–22	Super League Greece	22	6	2	0	—		2	1	26	7
Career total			323	80	28	9	6	4	2	1	359	94
