= Kyriakos Evangelidakis =

Greek footballer

Personal information
- Date of birth: 2 January 1994 (age 32)
- Place of birth: Lemnos, Greece
- Height: 1.75 m (5 ft 9 in)
- Position: Right-back

Youth career
- AEL Kalloni

Senior career*
Years	Team	Apps	(Gls)
2014–2017	AEL Kalloni	29	(3)
2014–2015	→ Fokikos (loan)	22	(0)
2017–2020	Diagoras	17	(0)
- * Club domestic league appearances and goals as of 1 July 2020

Kyriakos Evangelidakis (Greek: Κυριάκος Ευαγγελιδάκης; born 2 January 1994) is a Greek professional footballer who plays as a right-back.
