= Christos Mitsis =

Greek footballer

Personal information
- Full name: Christos Mitsis
- Date of birth: 10 July 1980 (age 46)
- Place of birth: Maroussi, Greece
- Height: 1.81 m (5 ft 11 1/2 in)
- Position: Left back

Youth career
- Kerkyra

Senior career*
Years	Team	Apps	(Gls)
1999–2001	Kerkyra		
2001–2003	Fostiras	43	(3)
2003–2004	Egaleo	0	(0)
2004–2006	Ethnikos Asteras	54	(9)
2006	PAS Giannina	11	(1)
2007	Levadiakos	19	(1)
2008	Panetolikos	10	(0)
2008–2009	Kavala	11	(1)
2009–2010	Aias Salamina	21	(0)
2010–2012	AEL Kalloni	43	(2)
2012–2013	Niki Volos	13	(2)
2013	Iraklis Psachna	19	(1)
2013–2014	AEL	22	(3)
2014–	Acheron Kanalaki		
- * Club domestic league appearances and goals

Christos Mitsis (born 10 July 1980, in Maroussi) is a Greek professional football defender currently playing for AEL in Gamma Ethniki.
