= Nikos Galas =

Greek footballer

Personal information
- Full name: Nikolaos Galas
- Date of birth: 7 March 1986 (age 40)
- Place of birth: Mytilene, Greece
- Height: 1.80 m (5 ft 11 in)
- Position: Midfielder

Senior career*
Years	Team	Apps	(Gls)
n/a–2004	AEL Kalloni		
2005–2006	Aiolikos		
2007–2008	Aiolikos	29	(6)
2008–2010	Ionikos	37	(1)
2010–2014	AEL Kalloni	37	(0)
- * Club domestic league appearances and goals

Nikos Galas (Greek: Νίκος Γάλας; born 7 March 1986) is a Greek football player who plays as a midfielder.

== Club career ==
He has played in AEL Kalloni, in 2002. In 2004 Nikos Galas moved to Panionios in 2004 for two years. In 2006, Galas was on trial at Macclesfield Town, training under Brian Horton, then at Stoke City under Tony Pulis. Galas was also on trial at Dunfermline under Jim Leishman who recommended Galas to Blackpool FC. On 6 September 2006 Galas played for the Sidesiders under reserves manager Steve Thompson, against a strong and previously unbeaten Manchester City reserves in a stunning 4–0 win. It was reported at the time that Simon Grayson, the Caretaker Manager at Blackpool looked to bring Galas to Blackpool but restricted finances couldn't enable the move. In the season 2007-2008 Galas went to Mytilene and Aiolikos who played 29 games and he scored 6 times, transferring to Nikaia. In August 2008 he went to Ionikos. Galas has also represented Greece International teams at U17 & U19 age groups. In August 2010 he quit Ionikos having agreed a new contract but the club allegedly could not meet the financial obligations of the agreement.

In August 2010 Galas on trial at Cheltenham Town in League Two of the English Football League. Galas played with Cheltenham Town reserve team squad for a reserves game against Bristol Rovers which Cheltenham lost 1-0 and he sustained an injury to his right foot. In August 2010 Galas signed terms for one season with AEL Kalloni of the Greek Football League two and in the opening game of the season scored in a 2–1 win against ZAKYNTHOS APS.
