= Michalis Karavasilis =

Greek footballer

Personal information
- Full name: Michail Karavasilis
- Date of birth: 14 November 1975 (age 50)
- Place of birth: Mytilene, Lesbos, Greece
- Height: 1.90 m (6 ft 3 in)
- Position: Goalkeeper

Senior career*
Years	Team	Apps	(Gls)
1998–2008	Aiolikos	19 (–)	
- * Club domestic league appearances and goals

Michalis Karavasilis (born 14 November 1975 in Mytilene, Lesbos) is a retired Greek footballer. As a goalkeeper, he played 17 seasons for Aiolikos including their last spell in the Gamma Ethniki.
