= Dimosthenis Manousakis =

Greek footballer

Personal information
- Full name: Dimosthenis Manousakis
- Date of birth: 19 January 1981 (age 45)
- Place of birth: Lemnos, Greece
- Height: 1.85 m (6 ft 1 in)
- Positions: Attacking midfielder; winger

Youth career
- 1989–1995: A.O Myrina
- 1995–1997: Iraklis Atsikis Limnou
- 1997–1998: A.E Limnos

Senior career*
Years	Team	Apps	(Gls)
1998–2001	Skoda Xanthi	0	(0)
1999	→ Nafpaktiakos Asteras (loan)	11	(2)
1999–2001	→ Egaleo (loan)	52	(5)
2001–2002	Egaleo	14	(0)
2002–2004	Chalkidona	48	(10)
2004–2008	Egaleo	59	(4)
2008	Ionikos	14	(1)
2008–2009	Ethnikos Achna	25	(4)
2009–2011	Trikala	51	(12)
2011–2013	AEL Kalloni	54	(4)
2013–2014	Niki Volos	34	(3)
2014	Acharnaikos	10	(0)
2015–2017	Aiolikos	0	(0)
2017–2018	Paleochora		

International career
1997–1998	Greece U17	3	(1)
1998–2000	Greece U19	1	(0)
2000–2002	Greece U21	4	(0)
2004	Greece Olympic	0	(0)
- * Club domestic league appearances and goals as of 1 June 2014

Dimosthenis "Dimos" Manousakis (Greek: Δημοσθένης "Δήμος" Μανουσάκης; born 19 January 1981) is a Greek former professional footballer.

== Club career ==
Manousakis began his professional career by signing with Skoda Xanthi in July 1998. He never appeared for the club in a league match, instead he went on loan to Nafpaktiakos Asteras F.C. and Egaleo F.C. He also played for Cypriot side Ethnikos Achna FC. He was only the second Lemnian footballer who played in the Super League Greece, after Vertsonis who had played in Apollon Smyrnis in the late '60s.

== International career ==
Manousakis first called at national Greek football team U-17 at 1997, which competed in an international tournament in Portugal in February and in France. Indeed, on 03/27/97 scored his first goal in a match at Gabon. Also in 1998 he was a member of the Greece U19 that played in the knockout stage of the European Championship in Scotland. Also was a member of the Greek Olympic Football team in 2004.

=== Honours & Statistics ===
Egaleo

- Beta Ethniki: 2000–01

Chalkidona

- Beta Ethniki: 2002–03

AEL Kalloni

- Beta Ethniki: 2012–13

Niki Volos

- Beta Ethniki: 2013–14

Appearances in Greece (up to July 2014): 381

- Super League Greece: 92
- Football League: 221
- Football League 2: 10
- Delta Ethniki: 11
- Greek Football Cup: 42
- UEFA Europa League: 5

Goals in Greece (up to July 2014): 54

- Super League: 7
- Football League: 33
- Football League 2: 1
- Delta Ethniki: 2
- Greek Football Cup: 11
