= Mamary Traoré =

Malian footballer (born 1980)

Personal information
- Full name: Mamary Traoré
- Date of birth: 29 April 1980 (age 46)
- Place of birth: Paris, France
- Height: 1.80 m (5 ft 11 in)
- Position: Defender

Senior career*
Years	Team	Apps	(Gls)
1998–2001	Montpellier B	25	(0)
2001–2003	Naval	15	(0)
2003–2005	Grenoble	3	(0)
2005–2006	Proodeftiki	22	(0)
2006–2007	Kallithea	14	(0)
2007–2009	Bamako	22	(1)
2009–2011	Ethnikos Asteras	63	(1)
2011–2013	AEL Kalloni	17	(0)

International career^{‡}
2003–2004	Mali	6	(0)
- * Club domestic league appearances and goals as of 30 March 2013 ‡ National team caps and goals as of 11 January 2010

Mamary Traoré (born 29 April 1980) is a Malian football defender. He last played for AEL Kalloni in the Greek Beta Ethniki.

== Career ==
Traoré previously played for Grenoble Foot 38 in the French Ligue 2 and Kallithea F.C. in the Greek Beta Ethniki.

== International career ==
He was a member of the Malian national squad at the 2004 African Cup of Nations.
