= Babis Tennes =

Greek coach and retired association football player (born 1953)

Personal information
- Full name: Charalampos Tennes
- Date of birth: 17 November 1953 (age 72)
- Place of birth: Athens, Greece
- Position: Midfielder

Youth career
- Apollon Smyrnis
- –1972: Patisia

Senior career*
Years	Team	Apps	(Gls)
1972–1977	Rouf		
1977–1980	Kallithea		
1980–1981	Olympiakos Nea Liosia		
1981–1982	Chalkida		

Managerial career
- 1992–1993: Kallithea
- 1993–1994: Ialysos
- 1994–1996: Athinaikos
- 1996–1997: Apollon Smyrnis
- 1997–1998: Kalamata
- 1998–1999: Panelefsiniakos
- 1999–2000: Paniliakos
- 2000–2001: Aris
- 2002–2003: Kerkyra
- 2003: Kallithea
- 2004–2005: Akratitos Ano Liosia
- 2005–2008: Kerkyra
- 2008: Levadiakos
- 2008: Ethnikos Asteras
- 2009: Panachaiki
- 2009–2010: Kerkyra
- 2011–2012: Panetolikos
- 2012–2013: AEL Kalloni
- 2013: Apollon Smyrnis
- 2014–2015: Lamia
- 2015–2016: Apollon Smyrnis
- 2016–2018: Lamia
- 2018–2019: Apollon Smyrnis
- 2020: Apollon Smyrnis
- 2020: Lamia
- 2021: Xanthi
- 2022: Apollon Smyrnis
- 2025: Iraklis
- * Club domestic league appearances and goals as of September 15, 2025

Babis Tennes (Greek: Μπάμπης Τεννές; born 17 November 1953) is a Greek association football coach and retired association football player who played as midfielder.

== Managerial career ==
Babis Tennes began his professional coaching career with Kallithea in 1993 in Gamma Ethniki. After that he built up his career with Super League clubs like Athinaikos, Panelefsiniakos and Kerkyra. Tennes returned to manage Kallithea in 2003. For the season 2015–16 he was the head coach of Apollon Smyrnis, leading them to the 4th place of the Football League.

== Managerial statistics ==
As of 15 September 2025

Team	From	To	Record				
Team	From	To	G	W	D	L	Win %
Kallithea	1 July 1992	30 June 1993	36	18	11	7	50.00
Ialysos	1 July 1993	30 June 1994	36	20	9	7	55.56
Athinaikos	12 December 1994	7 June 1996	72	29	16	27	40.28
Apollon Smyrnis	7 June 1996	6 December 1997	49	18	8	23	36.73
Kalamata	10 December 1997	18 March 1998	13	3	4	6	23.08
Panelefsiniakos	1 July 1998	12 January 1999	15	2	7	6	13.33
Paniliakos	20 January 1999	28 February 2000	44	16	7	21	36.36
Aris	1 July 2000	30 June 2001	39	18	7	14	46.15
Kerkyra	1 July 2002	7 January 2003	17	7	6	4	41.18
Kallithea	15 January 2003	7 December 2003	31	4	11	16	12.90
Akratitos Ano Liosia	20 January 2004	30 June 2005	47	20	13	14	42.55
Kerkyra	1 July 2005	12 February 2008	80	30	23	27	37.50
Levadiakos	5 March 2008	27 May 2008	7	4	0	3	57.14
Ethnikos Asteras	1 July 2008	8 December 2008	15	3	3	9	20.00
Panachaiki	13 May 2009	7 June 2009	0	0	0	0	—
Kerkyra	27 July 2009	29 November 2010	48	22	13	13	45.83
Panetolikos	10 January 2011	9 February 2012	38	16	10	12	42.11
AEL Kalloni	21 December 2012	30 June 2013	27	15	9	3	55.56
Apollon Smyrnis	11 October 2013	11 November 2013	5	1	2	2	20.00
Lamia	19 June 2014	25 January 2015	15	9	3	3	60.00
Apollon Smyrnis	3 November 2015	29 March 2016	21	13	3	5	61.90
Lamia	16 June 2016	5 September 2018	78	35	20	23	44.87
Apollon Smyrnis	26 November 2018	9 March 2019	15	2	3	10	13.33
Apollon Smyrnis	8 January 2020	2 September 2020	11	9	1	1	81.82
Lamia	8 October 2020	13 December 2020	6	0	2	4	0.00
Xanthi	1 March 2021	30 June 2021	19	11	6	2	57.89
Apollon Smyrnis	26 February 2022	30 June 2022	9	2	3	4	22.22
Iraklis	16 May 2025	14 September 2025	2	1	1	0	50.00
Total			795	328	201	266	41.26
