= Argyris Samios =

Greek footballer

Personal information
- Full name: Anargyros Samios
- Date of birth: 2 January 1990 (age 36)
- Place of birth: Athens, Greece
- Position: Midfielder

Youth career
- 2004–2008: Panathinaikos

Senior career*
Years	Team	Apps	(Gls)
2008–2010	Panathinaikos	0	(0)
2009	→ Ilisiakos (loan)	2	(0)
2009	→ Egaleo (loan)	1	(0)
2010	→ Olympiakos Chersonissos (loan)	12	(3)
2010–2011	Apollon Smyrnis	4	(0)
2011–2012	Proodeftiki	17	(0)
2012	Ethnikos Asteras	0	(0)
2012-2013	Ethnikos Piraeus	59	(27)
2014-2015	Atromitos Piraeus		
2015-2016	A.O.T. Alimos F.C.		
2016	Ionikos		
2016-2017	A.E. Kifisia		
2017-2018	Palliniakos		
2019	Fostiras		
2019-2020	Asteras Varis		
2021-2022	Ilioupoli		
2022-2023	Asteras Kaisarianis		
- * Club domestic league appearances and goals

Argyris Samios (Greek: Αργύρης Σάμιος; born 2 January 1990) is a Greek footballer who plays as an attacking midfielder.

== Career ==
Born in Athens, Samios began playing football for local side Panathinaikos F.C. He has played on loan for Egaleo F.C. in the Beta Ethniki and Olympiakos Chersonissos F.C. and Apollon Smyrnis in the Gamma Ethniki.
