= Helge Payer =

Austrian footballer

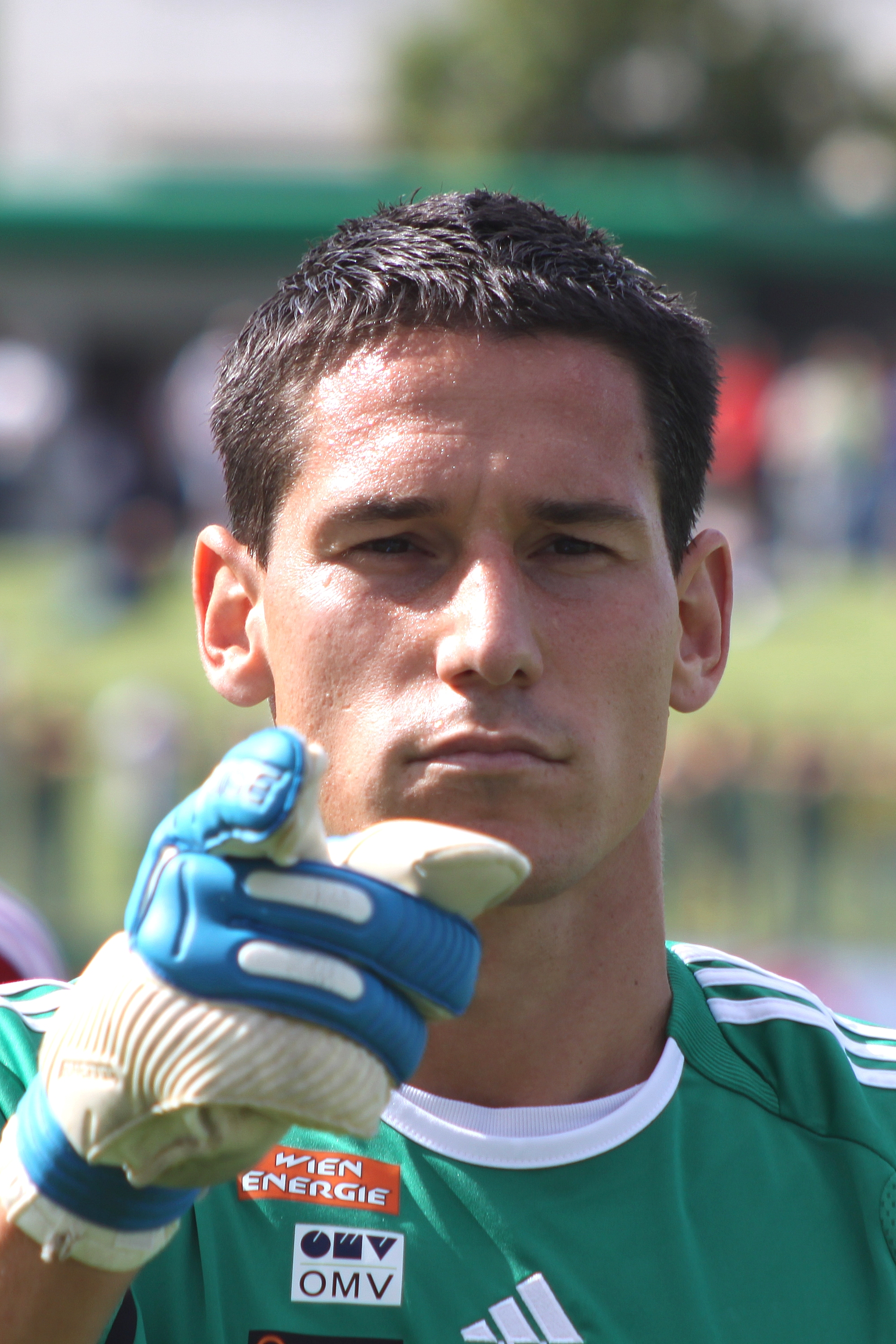
- Payer with Rapid Vienna

Personal information
- Date of birth: 9 August 1979 (age 47)
- Place of birth: Wels, Austria
- Height: 1.84 m (6 ft 0 in)
- Position: Goalkeeper

Youth career
- 1985–1991: Eintracht Wels
- 1991–2001: Rapid Vienna

Senior career*
Years	Team	Apps	(Gls)
2000–2001	→ Kottingbrunn (loan)	26	(0)
2001–2012	Rapid Vienna	242	(0)
2012–2013	AEL Kalloni	3	(0)
Total		271	(0)

International career
	Austria U16	11	(0)
	Austria U17	6	(0)
	Austria U18	10	(0)
	Austria U21	13	(0)
2003–2009	Austria	20	(0)
- * Club domestic league appearances and goals

Helge Payer (born 9 August 1979) is an Austrian former professional footballer who played as a goalkeeper. He played for the Austria national team.

== Club career ==
Payer came through the youth ranks at Rapid Wien to make his professional debut in the 2001–02 season, taking over the first-choice spot from Czech veteran Ladislav Maier. In 2006, he was also named team captain. With Rapid, he won two league titles, also appearing five times in the 2005–06 UEFA Champions League group stage.

On 27 August 2009, he saved an Ashley Young penalty at Villa Park in the UEFA Europa League as Rapid Wien lost to Aston Villa 2–1. Rapid did, however, proceed to the next round via the away goals rule.

== International career ==
Payer made his debut for Austria in a Euro 2004 qualifier in June 2003, against Belarus, coming on as a late substitute for Thomas Mandl.

After becoming a regular starter for the Nationalmannschaft, Payer was included in the 23-man squad for in Euro 2008, but was forced to pull out due to an intestinal thrombosis.

== Career statistics ==
Appearances and goals by national team and year
National team	Year	Apps	Goals
Austria	2003	2	0
Austria	2004	1	0
Austria	2005	4	0
Austria	2006	4	0
Austria	2007	3	0
Austria	2008	1	0
Austria	2009	5	0
Total		20	0

== Honours ==
Rapid Wien

- Austrian Bundesliga: 2004-05, 2007-08
