= Vlasis Kazakis =

Greek footballer

Personal information
- Date of birth: 17 June 1983 (age 43)
- Place of birth: Komotini, Greece
- Height: 1.87 m (6 ft 2 in)
- Position: Forward

Senior career*
Years	Team	Apps	(Gls)
2002–2008	Skoda Xanthi	87	(7)
2008–2009	Ethnikos Piraeus	36	(9)
2009	Atromitos	16	(1)
2009–2011	Panthrakikos	40	(1)
2011–2012	Skoda Xanthi	30	(3)
2012–2014	AEL Kalloni	34	(1)
2014–2015	Aiginiakos	9	(1)
2015–2016	Kavala		
- * Club domestic league appearances and goals

Vlasis Kazakis (Greek: Βλάσης Καζάκης; born 17 June 1983) is a Greek former professional footballer who played as a forward.

== Career ==
Kazakis began his career as a professional footballer in Skoda Xanthi in 2002. Until 2008 he competed in Super League Greece with Skoda Xanthi. He competed for Ethnikos Piraeus and Atromitos in the 2008–09 Beta Ethniki. He competed again in the 2009–10 Super League Greece with Panthrakikos. In 2011, he joined again Skoda Xanthi, but did not spend much time there. On 15 August 2012, AEL Kalloni announced his transfer to the team of Lesbos island, which participates in the Football League (Greece).

== Career statistics ==
Appearances and goals by club, season and competition
Club	Season	League			National cup		Europe cup		Total	
Club	Season	Division	Apps	Goals	Apps	Goals	Apps	Goals	Apps	Goals
Skoda Xanthi	2002–03	Super League	11	0	0	0	0	0	11	0
Skoda Xanthi	2003–04	Super League	17	1	0	0	0	0	17	1
Skoda Xanthi	2004–05	Super League	16	2	0	0	0	0	16	2
Skoda Xanthi	2005–06	Super League	22	2	0	0	2	0	24	2
Skoda Xanthi	2006–07	Super League	16	2	0	0	2	1	18	3
Skoda Xanthi	2007–08	Super League	4	0	0	0	0	0	4	0
Ethnikos	2008	Beta Ethniki	13	3	0	0	0	0	13	3
Atromitos	2009	Beta Ethniki	16	1	0	0	0	0	16	1
Panthrakikos	2009–10	Super League	28	1	1	0	0	0	29	1
Panthrakikos	2010–11	Beta Ethniki	12	0	1	1	0	0	13	1
Skoda Xanthi	2011–12	Super League Greece	20	3						
AEL Kalloni	2012–13	Beta Ethniki	0	0	0	0	0	0	0	0
Career total										

Date of last update: 15 Aug 2012
