= Walid Cherfa =

French footballer (born 1986)

Personal information
- Full name: Walid Cherfa
- Date of birth: 19 February 1986 (age 40)
- Place of birth: Toulouse, France
- Height: 1.85 m (6 ft 1 in)
- Position: Left back

Team information
- Current team: Toulouse Rodéo

Youth career
- 2002–2006: Toulouse

Senior career*
Years	Team	Apps	(Gls)
2006–2008	Toulouse	4	(0)
2007–2008	→ Tours (loan)	27	(1)
2008–2010	Gimnàstic	30	(1)
2010	Girona	0	(0)
2011	Albacete	9	(0)
2011–2012	MC Alger	4	(0)
2012–2013	AEL Kalloni	23	(0)
2013–2014	Toulouse Fontaines	10	(1)
2014–2017	Toulouse Rodéo	66	(7)
2017–2019	Balma	37	(1)
2019–	Toulouse Rodéo		
- * Club domestic league appearances and goals

Walid Cherfa (Arabic: وليد شرفة; born 19 February 1986) is a French professional footballer who plays as a left-back for French club Toulouse Rodéo.

== Career ==
Cherfa was born in Toulouse, France. He holds both French and Algerian nationalities.

A Toulouse FC youth graduate, he appeared sparingly for the first team during the 2006–07 season in Ligue 1, subsequently serving a stint with third division club Tours FC.

On 26 June 2008, Cherfa moved to Spain and joined Gimnàstic de Tarragona in the second level on a two-year contract. On 23 June 2010, having been sparingly used during his tenure, he signed a 1+1 deal with another side in that country and category, Girona FC.

In late December 2010, without having appeared in any competitive matches for Girona, Cherfa terminated his link with the Catalans and signed for Albacete Balompié, also in the Spanish division two. On 16 August of the following year, he agreed to a two-year deal with Algerian Ligue Professionnelle 1 side MC Alger.

On 1 January 2012, Cherfa was released by the club. In August 2012 he joined AEL Kalloni in the Greek second tier, and subsequently competed in the French lower or amateur leagues.

== Personal life ==
Cherfa's older brother, Sofyane, was also a footballer and a defender. He too played most of his career in France.
