= Kostas Chatzikyriakos =

Greek footballer (born 1979)

Personal information
- Full name: Konstantinos Chatzikyriakos
- Date of birth: 14 May 1979 (age 47)
- Place of birth: Mytilene, Greece
- Height: 1.75 m (5 ft 9 in)
- Position: Defender

Team information
- Current team: A.E.L. Kalloni

Senior career*
Years	Team	Apps	(Gls)
n/a–n/a	Aiolikos	n/a (n/a)	
n/a–n/a	Aigeas Plomari	n/a (n/a)	
2007–2008	Aiolikos	13 (–)	
2008–present	A.E.L. Kalloni	n/a (n/a)	
- * Club domestic league appearances and goals

Kostas Chatzikyriakos (Greek: Κώστας Χατζηκυριάκος; born 14 May 1979) is a Greek football player who plays for Aiolikos F.C. .

He previously played for A.E.L.K in the Gamma Ethniki.
