= Luciano de Souza =

Greek-Brazilian football manager and former player

- Luciano in 2010 playing for Panachaiki

Personal information
- Date of birth: 21 August 1972 (age 54)
- Place of birth: Volta Redonda, Brazil
- Height: 1.68 m (5 ft 6 in)
- Position: Midfielder

Team information
- Current team: Panetolikos (youth coach)

Youth career
- 1990–1991: São José
- 1992: Corinthians
- 1992: Internacional
- 1993: Portuguesa

Senior career*
Years	Team	Apps	(Gls)
1994–1995	Santos	0	(0)
1995–1998	Skoda Xanthi	64	(19)
1996	→ Kastoria (loan)	14	(5)
1998–2001	Olympiacos	57	(13)
2001–2002	PAOK	9	(0)
2002–2004	AEL Limassol	31	(9)
2004	Portuguesa	0	(0)
2004–2006	Skoda Xanthi	34	(20)
2006	Panionios	14	(10)
2006–2008	Atromitos	49	(9)
2008–2009	PAS Giannina	27	(6)
2009–2010	Skoda Xanthi	15	(1)
2010–2011	Panachaiki	9	(6)
2011	AEL Kalloni	0	(0)
Total		323	(78)

Managerial career
- 2011–2012: AEL Kalloni
- 2012: AEL Kalloni (assistant)
- 2011–2012: Egaleo
- 2013–2014: Glyfada
- 2014: Niki Volos
- 2014: Panargiakos
- 2015–2016: Ilisiakos
- 2016–2018: Xanthi (assistant)
- 2018–2019: Panetolikos (youth)
- 2019–2020: Panetolikos (assistant)
- 2020–: Panetolikos (youth)
- 2020: Panetolikos (caretaker)
- * Club domestic league appearances and goals

Luciano de Souza (Brazilian Portuguese pronunciation: [luˈsjɐ̃nu dʒi ˈsowzɐ]; born 21 August 1972), sometimes known mononymously as Luciano, is a Brazilian-Greek former professional footballer and current football manager. His main strengths were his technique and free kick ability, along with long distance shots.

After beginning in Brazil with Santos FC, de Souza spent his entire playing career in Greece (save for two seasons in neighbours Cyprus), at one point playing for Olympiacos from 1998 to 2001, where he won three Greek League titles and one Greek Cup.

He also represented Skoda Xanthi, Kastoria, PAOK, AEL Limassol, Panionios, Atromitos F.C., PAS Giannina F.C., Panachaiki F.C. and AEL Kalloni, where he ended his career in order to be their head coach.

== Honours ==
Olympiacos

- Alpha Ethniki: 1998–99, 1999–2000, 2000–01
- Greek Cup: 1998–99
