= Bruno Paes (footballer) =

Brazilian footballer (born 1982)

Personal information
- Full name: Bruno de Oliveira Godoy Paes
- Date of birth: May 3, 1982 (age 44)
- Place of birth: Campinas, Brazil
- Height: 1.76 m (5 ft 9 in)
- Position: Defender

Senior career*
Years	Team	Apps	(Gls)
2007-2008	Aris	17	(0)
2008–2011	Sandanski	8	(0)
2011–2012	AEL Kalloni	6	(0)
- * Club domestic league appearances and goals as of 22:20, 22 August 2011 (UTC)

Bruno de Oliveira Godoy Paes (born May 3, 1982) is a Brazilian former football player.
