= Petros Zouroudis =

Greek footballer

Personal information
- Full name: Petros Zouroudis
- Date of birth: 6 March 1979 (age 47)
- Place of birth: Rodos, Greece
- Height: 1.82 m (6 ft 0 in)
- Position: Striker

Team information
- Current team: Olympiacos Agios Stefanos

Senior career*
Years	Team	Apps	(Gls)
1997–1998	Skoda Xanthi	0	(0)
1998	Atromitos	0	(0)
1998–2000	Chalkida	0	(0)
2000–2001	Panelefsiniakos	14	(4)
2001–2004	Thrasyvoulos	59	(11)
2004–2005	Panetolikos	31	(17)
2005–2007	Kastoria	52	(15)
2007	PAS Giannina	1	(0)
2008–2010	Panetolikos	82	(22)
2010	Diagoras	17	(2)
2010–2012	Levadiakos	28	(10)
2012	AEL Kalloni	17	(2)
2012–2013	AEL	10	(0)
2013	Aiginiakos	8	(0)
2013–2015	Diagoras		
2015–2016	Iraklis Lardou		
2017–	Olympiakos Agiou Stefanou		
- * Club domestic league appearances and goals

Petros Zouroudis (born 6 March 1979 in Rodos, Greece) is a professional football striker, currently playing for Olympiacos Agios Stefanos.

== Career ==
Zouroudis was honored as the top goalscorer for the North group of the Gamma Ethniki with 17 goals in the 2004–05 season. He was also awarded the player of the year award for the Greek third division by the PSAP (association of professional Greek footballers) for the 2004–05 season, as he was instrumental in Panetolikos' battle against relegation that season. His performance that year earned him a transfer to Kastoria in the summer of 2005, where he stayed for two years. In 2007, Zouroudis transferred to PAS Giannina, but appeared in only one game. After six months, he transferred to Panetolikos, during the winter transfer season of the period 2007–08. He spent two and a half years in Agrinio, helping Panetolikos return to Beta Ethniki. After spending half of the 2010–11 season playing for Diagoras, he signed with Levadiakos during the winter transfer window. In January 2012 he was transferred to AEL Kalloni, a Greek football club based in Lesbos, where he played until the end of the 2011–12 season. On 27 July 2012, it was officially announced from AEL that he had signed a one-year contract.
