= Nikos Chatzopoulos =

Greek footballer (born 1985)

Personal information
- Date of birth: 3 January 1985 (age 41)
- Place of birth: Athens, Greece
- Height: 1.84 m (6 ft 1/2 in)
- Position: Defender

Team information
- Current team: AEL Kalloni
- Number: 31

Senior career*
Years	Team	Apps	(Gls)
2005–2009	Asteras Tripolis	31	(1)
2008–2009	→ Pierikos (loan)	19	(0)
2009–2010	Panargiakos	27	(2)
2010–2011	Diagoras	26	(0)
2011–2014	AEL Kalloni		
2015–	Panarkadikos F.C.		
- * Club domestic league appearances and goals as of 1 July 2011

Nikos Chatzopoulos (Greek: Νίκος Χατζόπουλος; born 11 Ιουνίου 1961) is a professional footballer who plays as a defender for AEL Kalloni in the Football League.

== Career ==
Born in Athens, Chatzopoulos began playing football with local side Asteras Tripolis in the Gamma Ethniki. He helped the club to successive promotions, eventually making three appearances in the Alpha Ethniki, before going on loan to Pierikos in 2008. His father Paul (Polyvios) is a former international player who was playing with AEK Athens F.C. Since 2015 he plays for the local side Panarkadikos F.C. in the Gamma Ethniki
