= Marko dos Santos =

Brazilian footballer

Personal information
- Full name: Marcos Paulo dos Santos
- Date of birth: 18 May 1981 (age 45)
- Place of birth: Brazil
- Position: Winger

Youth career
- –2003: Sparta (MG)

Senior career*
Years	Team	Apps	(Gls)
2003–2005	Apolonia Fier	40	(23)
2006–2010	Gramozi Ersekë	57	(29)
2010–2011	Besa Kavajë	32	(3)
2011–2012	AEL Kalloni	28	(5)
2012–2013	Kavala	27	(0)
2013–2014	AEL Kalloni	3	(0)
2014	Acharnaikos	9	(2)
2014–2015	Ayia Napa	10	(5)
2015–2017	Doxa Drama	50	(15)
- * Club domestic league appearances and goals as of 1 July 2014

Marcos Paulo dos Santos or simply known as Marko dos Santos (born 18 May 1981) is a Albanian-Brazilian footballer who plays as a winger.

He came to Albania on 24 January 2003 when he signed for Apollonia coming from Sparta Futebol Clube from Minas Gerais.

== Besa Kavajë ==
Dos Santos made his debut for Besa against Olympiacos F.C. in Tirana in the UEFA Europa League. He played as a striker having very good performance, although his team lost 5-0.
