= Leozinho (footballer, born 1985) =

Brazilian footballer

Personal information
- Full name: Leandro Sales de Santana
- Date of birth: 12 December 1985 (age 40)
- Place of birth: São Luís, Brazil
- Height: 1.71 m (5 ft 7 in)
- Position: Attacking midfielder

Youth career
- –2005: Sport Recife

Senior career*
Years	Team	Apps	(Gls)
2005–2006	Vasco da Gama	2	(0)
2006	Sport Recife	11	(0)
2006–2007	Treze	9	(4)
2007–2008	Olympiacos	0	(0)
2007–2008	→ Eintracht Braunschweig (loan)	12	(2)
2008	→ OFI (loan)	20	(6)
2008–2009	Apollon Kalamarias	26	(5)
2009–2011	Panserraikos	61	(17)
2011–2015	AEL Kalloni	134	(35)
2015–2016	Denizlispor	13	(0)
2016–2017	Iraklis	37	(6)
2017–2019	AEL	29	(1)
2019–2020	Chania	7	(1)
2021	Vitória-PE	3	(1)

International career
2004	Brazil U-20		
- * Club domestic league appearances and goals as of 17 January 2020

Leandro Sales de Santana, better known as Leozinho (born 12 December 1985 in São Luís), is a retired Brazilian footballer who plays as midfielder.

== Career ==
An attacking midfielder in a creative role, who can also play wider, Leozinho started his professional career with Brazilian club Vasco da Gama but failed to make an impact. He continued his career by returning to his youth club Sport Recife. After joining Treze, interest in him also came from Europe. In 2007, he joined Greek champions Olympiacos, though failing to make an appearance for the team, and was mostly sent away on loan. Since then he has played for seven different clubs, including German side Braunschweig, Greek clubs OFI, Apollon Kalamarias, Panserraikos, AEL Kalloni, Iraklis, and Turkish side Denizlispor.

On 27 May 2017, Leozinho signed a two-year contract with AEL. On 26 November 2017 he scored his first goal in a 3-1 away loss against Panetolikos. On 21 December 2017 he sealed a 3-0 home win against Xanthi for the first leg of the round of 16 of the Greek Cup.
