= Bartosz Tarachulski =

Polish footballer and manager

Personal information
- Full name: Bartosz Tarachulski
- Date of birth: 14 May 1975 (age 51)
- Place of birth: Gliwice, Poland
- Height: 1.90 m (6 ft 3 in)
- Position: Striker

Youth career
- 1989–1990: Piast Gliwice
- 1990–1994: Górnik Zabrze

Senior career*
Years	Team	Apps	(Gls)
1994–1996	Górnik Zabrze	8	(3)
1996–1999	Polonia Warsaw	65	(15)
1999–2000	Beveren	25	(3)
2000	Ruch Chorzów	10	(1)
2001	Widzew Łódź	13	(4)
2001–2002	Polonia Warsaw	26	(4)
2002–2003	Hapoel Be'er Sheva	29	(5)
2003–2004	Polonia Warsaw	22	(3)
2004–2005	Yeovil Town	41	(10)
2005–2006	Dunfermline Athletic	27	(0)
2006–2007	Veria	32	(11)
2007–2009	Kavala	63	(17)
2009–2011	Diagoras	53	(17)
2011–2012	AEL Kalloni	25	(4)
2013–2015	Pogoń Siedlce	30	(5)
2016	Pogoń Siedlce	0	(0)
Total		469	(102)

Managerial career
- 2014–2015: Pogoń Siedlce (interim player-manager)
- 2015: Pogoń Siedlce (playing caretaker)
- 2016: Pogoń Siedlce (caretaker)
- 2017: Pogoń Siedlce (caretaker)
- 2018: Legionovia Legionowo
- 2019–2021: Pogoń Siedlce
- 2022–2023: KKS 1925 Kalisz
- 2023–2024: Stomil Olsztyn
- * Club domestic league appearances and goals

Bartosz Tarachulski (born 14 May 1975) is a Polish professional football manager and former player who was most recently in charge of II liga club Stomil Olsztyn.

== Career ==
Tarachulski has enjoyed spells in Poland, Israel and Belgium. From Beveren in Belgium, he signed for English side Yeovil Town, helping them to gain promotion scoring ten league goals. He quickly became a firm favourite amongst the fans and was known for a brilliant first touch. He left the Glovers after they won promotion to League One to sign for Dunfermline Athletic in the Scottish Premier League. At Dunfermline, he played in the 2006 Scottish League Cup Final against Celtic. He was released after just one season and signed for Greek side Veria. In 2007, he signed for Kavala.

== Honours ==
Yeovil Town

- Football League Two: 2004–05
