= Mytilene Municipal Stadium =

Football stadium in Mytilene, Greece

Coordinates: 39°5′52.15″N 26°33′15.36″E

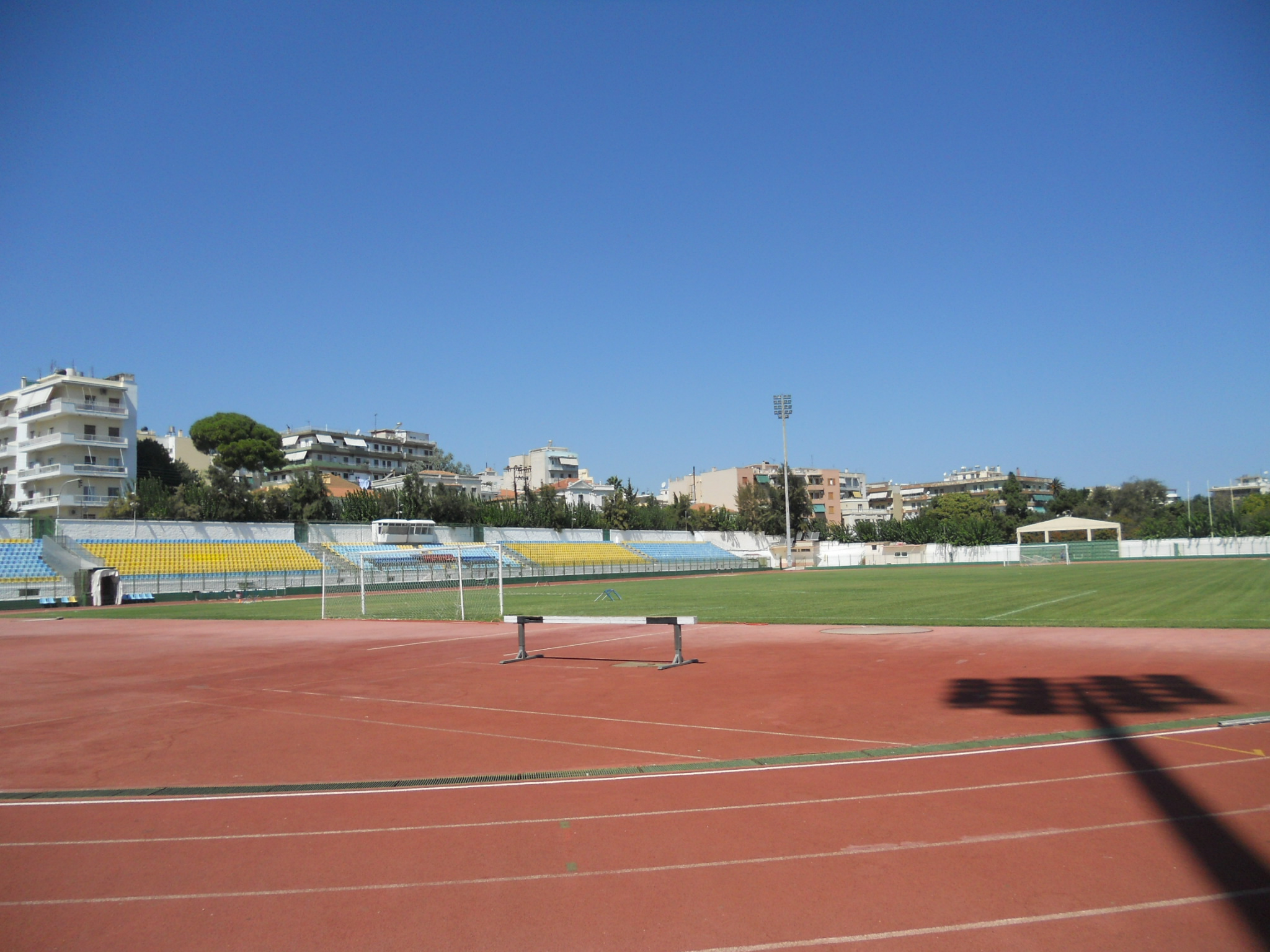
- Tarlas
- Interactive map of Mytilene Municipal Stadium
- Former names: Mytilene National Stadium
- Location: Mytilene, Lesbos, Greece
- Owner: Municipality of Lesbos
- Operator: Municipality of Lesbos
- Capacity: 3,300
- Surface: Grass
- Field size: 102 m × 65 m (335 ft × 213 ft)

Construction
- Opened: 1960s
- Renovated: 2014
- Cost: 1,500,000 € (2014 renovation)

Tenants
- Aiolikos (1975–2025); AEL Kalloni (2011–2017); AIO Mytilini (2025–)

Mytilene Municipal Stadium (Greek: Δημοτικό Στάδιο Μυτιλήνης) is a multi-use stadium in Mytilene, Greece. It is currently used mostly for football matches and is the home stadium of AIO Mytilini. The stadium holds 3,300 people, all-seated.

== Nickname ==
Stadium's nickname is Tarlas (Greek: Ταρλάς), which is inspired by the old name of the settlement where the stadium is built. The word is originated from a Turkish word, which means tract or field.

== Information ==
The stadium has five gates. It has also one big stand and track. The stand is separated in five sections, while there are 100 seats for VIP. In 2001 were put projectors and seats have been placed on all the stand. Until then, only a little section of the stand had seats. On the occasion of 2004 Olympic Games, have been more important projects to changing rooms and other rooms below the stand. The stadium radically reconstructed in 2014, in the occasion of promotion of AEL Kalloni to Superleague Greece.

== Other events ==
Concerts are often held here. Famous singers such as Anna Vissi, Sakis Rouvas, Antonis Remos and Michalis Hatzigiannis have played the venue over the years.
