= 2010–11 Football League (Greece) =

Football League
- Season: 2010–11
- Dates: 12 September 2010 – 15 May 2011
- Champions: Panetolikos
- Promoted: Panetolikos; PAS Giannina; OFI; Levadiakos; Doxa Drama
- Relegated: Ethnikos Piraeus; Ionikos; Anagennisi Karditsa; Ilioupoli; Trikala
- Matches: 306
- Goals: 653 (2.13 per match)
- Biggest home win: PAS Giannina 5–0 Veria; PAS Giannina 5–0 Diagoras
- Biggest away win: Agrotikos Asteras 1–4 Kallithea
- Highest scoring: Ethikos Asteras 4–3 Diagoras; Ethnikos 4–3 Kallithea

The 2010–11 Football League is the second division of the Greek professional football system and the first season under the name Football League after previously being known as Beta Ethniki. Its regular season began on 12 September 2010 and ended on 15 May 2011; the promotion play-offs, originally scheduled to take place immediately afterwards, were postponed to late July 2011 in wake of the Koriopolis scandal.

== Teams ==
A total of three teams gained promotion to the 2010–11 Super League after the 2009–10 Beta Ethniki season. Champions Olympiacos Volos and runners-up Kerkyra were directly promoted, while the remaining spot was taken by promotion play-off group winners Panserraikos. The three promoted teams were replaced by Levadiakos, PAS Giannina and Panthrakikos, who finished in the bottom three places of the 2009–10 Super League.

On the bottom end of the table, Rodos, Kalamata and Egaleo were relegated to the 2010–11 Football League 2, the former Gamma Ethniki. Kalamata and Egaleo were directly relegated after finishing in the bottom two places of the table, while Rodos finished bottom in the relegation play-off group. The relegated teams were replaced by 2009–10 Gamma Ethniki South champions Kallithea, North champions Veria and promotion play-off match winners Trikala.

Location of teams in 2010–11 Football League

Team	Location	Last season
Agrotikos Asteras	Thessaloniki	10th
Anagennisi Karditsa	Karditsa	12th
Diagoras	Rhodes	8th
Doxa Drama	Drama	14th
Ethnikos Asteras	Athens	11th
Ethnikos Piraeus	Piraeus	4th
Ilioupoli	Athens	9th
Ionikos	Piraeus	15th
Kallithea	Kallithea	GE South, 1st
Levadiakos	Livadeia	SL, 14th
OFI	Heraklion	3rd
Panetolikos	Agrinio	7th
Panthrakikos	Komotini	SL, 16th
PAS Giannina	Ioannina	SL, 15th
Pierikos	Katerini	6th
Thrasyvoulos	Athens	13th
Trikala	Trikala	GE North, 2nd
Veria	Veria	GE North, 1st

== League table ==
Pos	Team	Pld	W	D	L	GF	GA	GD	Pts	Promotion or relegation
1	Panetolikos (C, P)	34	23	6	5	47	19	+28	75	Promotion to Super League
2	PAS Giannina (P)	34	22	8	4	55	17	+38	74	Promotion to Super League
3	OFI (P)	34	21	6	7	42	20	+22	69	Qualification for promotion play-offs
4	Levadiakos (P)	34	17	9	8	48	33	+15	60	Qualification for promotion play-offs
5	Doxa Drama (P)	34	16	8	10	51	28	+23	56	Qualification for promotion play-offs
6	Diagoras	34	15	7	12	36	36	0	52	Qualification for promotion play-offs
7	Panthrakikos	34	13	8	13	36	38	−2	47	
8	Veria	34	12	8	14	37	42	−5	44	
9	Pierikos	34	11	10	13	39	43	−4	43	
10	Agrotikos Asteras	34	11	7	16	34	41	−7	40	
11	Ethnikos Asteras	34	9	11	14	27	38	−11	38	
12	Thrasyvoulos	34	9	9	16	33	36	−3	36	
13	Kallithea	34	3	10	21	27	54	−27	19	
14	Ethnikos Piraeus (Note: On 26 September 2011, the Professional Sports Committee stripped Ionikos, Ethnikos Piraeus, Ilioupoli and Trikala of their professional licence.) (R)	33	8	8	17	28	48	−20	32	Relegation to Delta Ethniki (Note: Anagennisi Karditsa, Ionikos and Ethnikos Piraeus were automatically placed in the last three positions of the table and demoted to the Football League 2 after having been found guilty of forgery during the winter transfer window,)
15	Ionikos (R)	35	9	9	17	25	51	−26	36	Relegation to Delta Ethniki
16	Anagennisi Karditsa (Note: On 26 September 2011, the Professional Sports Committee stripped Anagennisi Karditsa of their professional licence. Anagennisi also had 16 points deducted.) (R)	34	9	6	19	20	43	−23	17	Relegation to Delta Ethniki
17	Ilioupoli (R)	34	10	6	18	29	50	−21	36	Relegation to Delta Ethniki (Note: On 3 August 2011, Ilioupoli was found guilty of match-fixing. Therefore, they were automatically put at the end of the league table and demoted to the Football League 2. Their appeal was unsuccessful.)
18	Trikala (R)	34	18	6	10	42	23	+19	60	Relegation to Delta Ethniki (Note: Trikala were expelled from the league after the conclusion of the season as they were found guilty of forgery. Therefore, they were automatically put at the end of the league table and demoted to the Football League 2. Though a final decision hasn't been made yet.)

Source: Football League, Soccerway
Rules for classification: 1) points; 2) head-to-head points; 3) head-to-head goal difference; 4) head-to-head goals scored; 5) goal difference; 6) number of goals scored.
(C) Champions; (P) Promoted; (R) Relegated

== Results ==
Home \ Away	AGR	KRD	DIA	DDR	ETA	ETH	ILI	ION	KLT	LEV	OFI	PNT	PTH	PAS	PIE	THR	TRI	VER
Agrotikos Asteras		3–1	3–0	1–3	1–0	0–1	1–0	2–1	1–4	0–1	2–0	0–1	2–0	0–0	2–0	0–0	0–0	3–2
Anagennisi Karditsa	2–0		0–3	2–1 (Note: Anagennisi Karditsa won the match 2–1, but was later penalized for forgery and lost the match with 0–3.)	1–0	0–1	1–0	0–0	1–0	0–0	2–1	0–1	2–1	1–1	2–0	0–3	0–1	2–3
Diagoras	2–2	1–0		1–0	1–0	0–0	1–2	2–1	2–0	1–1	0–1	2–0	2–0	0–0	3–0	0–0	0–1	1–0
Doxa Drama	4–0	4–0	2–0		0–0	4–0	2–0	5–1	2–0	2–1	0–2	0–1	2–2	2–0	0–0	2–0	0–1	2–2
Ethnikos Asteras	2–1	2–1	4–3	0–0		2–1	1–2	0–0	1–1	1–1	0–0	0–1	1–1	0–1	1–0	1–1	1–0	3–1
Ethnikos Piraeus	0–3 (Note: Ethnikos Piraeus won the match 2–0, but was later penalized for forgery and lost the match with 0–3.)	0–0	2–4	2–2	0–2		0–1	1–2	4–3	1–1	1–0	0–1	1–2	1–3	2–1	0–0	1–2	2–1
Ilioupoli	1–0	1–0	1–2	0–2	2–2	0–0		0–2	2–0	2–4	1–2	2–3	0–0	1–1	2–1	1–0	2–0	1–0
Ionikos	1–0	0–3 (Note: Ionikos won the match 1–0, but was later penalized for forgery and lost the match with 0–3.)	2–1	0–0	0–0	1–0	3–0		0–0	0–3	1–2	0–2	0–1	0–0	2–1	2–1	0–2	0–0
Kallithea	1–2	2–1	0–1	0–1	1–0	1–2	1–1	2–2		1–2	0–1	0–1	1–1	0–3	1–1	1–2	0–2	2–4
Levadiakos	1–0	2–0	0–1	2–0	4–0	2–1	1–0	2–1	3–0		1–1	0–0	1–0	1–0	3–1	2–2	3–1	2–2
OFI	1–0	2–0	2–0	2–1	1–0	1–0	4–1	3–1	0–0	1–0		1–0	2–1	4–1	0–0	1–0	1–1	2–0
Panetolikos	4–0	3–1	3–0	1–1	2–0	1–2	2–0	4–0	0–0	2–0	2–1		1–0	1–1	2–1	2–0	1–0	1–0
Panthrakikos	3–2	2–0	0–0	0–1	1–2	1–0	3–1	1–0	2–0	3–1	1–0	1–1		0–2	3–0	1–0	0–0	1–0
PAS Giannina	1–0	1–0	5–0	1–0	3–0	3–1	3–0	0–0	3–1	2–0	1–0	3–0	2–1		3–1	1–0	2–0	5–0
Pierikos	1–0	1–0	0–0	1–0	1–1	1–1	2–1	3–0 (Note: Ionikos drew the match 0–0, but was later penalized for unpaid debts and lost the match with 0–3.)	2–2	2–2	1–1	0–1	4–1	1–1		3–1	2–0	3–2
Thrasyvoulos	2–2	0–0	0–2	4–1	2–0	0–0	1–1	4–1	3–2	0–1	0–1	0–1	3–2	0–1	1–2		2–0	1–0
Trikala	1–1	0–0	1–0	2–0	1–0	1–0	4–0	4–0	1–0	4–0	0–1	2–0	4–0	1–0	1–2	1–0		2–2
Veria	0–0	2–0	1–2	1–3	2–0	2–0	1–0	2–1	0–0	1–0	1–0	1–1	0–0	0–1	1–0	1–0	2–1	

Source: Soccerway
Legend: Blue = home team win; Yellow = draw; Red = away team win.

== Play-offs ==
A number of teams were scheduled to take part in two different double round-robin tournaments after the conclusion of the regular season, with four teams to compete for the third available promotion spot and four teams to avoid relegation. However, the relegation play-offs were cancelled after several teams were demoted because of financial irregularities.

Each play-off participant was assigned a number of bonus points in relation to their result of the regular season. The worst-placed team of each group started the play-off with 0 points. The number of points earned during the regular season by these teams was then subtracted from the points of each other team of the respective group; the result was divided by four and rounded to the nearest whole number of points, if necessary.

=== Promotion play-offs ===
The promotion play-offs initially comprised the teams ranked 3rd through 6th during the regular season, OFI, Trikala, Levadiakos and Doxa Drama and were scheduled to take place in late May, immediately after the conclusion of the regular season. However, the round was postponed due to the investigations in the Koriopolis scandal. Trikala were eventually found guilty of forgery and demoted to the amateur leagues; their spot in the promotion play-off was taken by 7th-placed Diagoras.

As outlined above, Diagoras' earned total of 52 points during the regular season were taken as a base for the calculation of bonus points for the other play-off participants. OFI had collected 69 points, 17 more than Diagoras Rodos, and hence were assigned a four-point bonus. Similarly, Levadiakos (60 points) were awarded two bonus points and Doxa Drama (56 points) were given a one-point bonus. OFI won the play-off and were promoted to 2011–12 Super League Greece. Levadiakos and Doxa Drama were also promoted because Olympiacos Volos and Kavala were relegated because of Koriopolis.

Pos	Team	Pld	W	D	L	GF	GA	GD	Pts	Promotion or relegation	OFI	LEV	DDR	DIA
1	OFI (O, P)	6	4	2	0	12	5	+7	18	Promotion to Super League (Note: Levadiakos and Doxa Drama could be promoted, as Olympiacos Volos and Kavala were not granted a Super League License for 2011–12 Super League, if AEL and Panserraikos were relegated.)		1–1	3–0 (Note: w.o. (The matches were awarded by a score of 3–0 as Doxa Drama had not enough players to field a full side.))	3–0
2	Levadiakos (P)	6	4	1	1	12	2	+10	15	Promotion to Super League	0–1		3–0	4–0
3	Doxa Drama (P)	6	1	2	3	5	13	−8	6	Promotion to Super League	3–3	0–3		1–1
4	Diagoras	6	0	1	5	2	12	−10	1		1–2	0–1	0–1	

Source: Soccerway
Legend: Blue = home team win; Yellow = draw; Red = away team win.
Rules for classification: 1) points; 2) goal difference; 3) number of goals scored.
(O) Play-off winners; (P) Promoted

=== Relegation play-offs ===
The relegation play-offs initially comprised the teams ranked 13th through 16th during the regular season, Ionikos, Ilioupoli, Thrasyvoulos and Ethnikos Piraeus and were scheduled to take place in late May, immediately after the conclusion of the regular season. However, the round was eventually cancelled after Trikala, Anagennisi Karditsa, Ionikos and Asteras Piraeus were all found guilty of forgery and demoted from the league.

== Top scorers ==
Source: Soccerway

Rank	Player	Club	Goals
1	(Ivory Coast) Ibrahima Bakayoko	PAS Giannina	19
2	(Serbia) Marko Markovski	Doxa Drama	18
3	(Greece) Giorgos Zacharopoulos	Thrasyvoulos	15
4	(Greece) Anestis Agritis	OFI	11
4	(Greece) Georgios Barkoglou	Levadiakos	11
4	(Greece) Georgios Saitiotis	Veria	11
4	(Greece) Dimitrios Sialmas	PAS Giannina	11
8	(Greece) Giorgos Theodoridis	Panetolikos	10
9	(Greece) Georgios Gougoulias	Pierikos	9
9	(Greece) Evangelos Kontogoulidis	Trikala	9
9	(Poland) Bartosz Tarachulski	Diagoras	9
