= Aiolikos F.C. =

Disbanded association football club in Greece

Aiolikos FC
- Full name: Aiolikos Football Club
- Nickname: Aio
- Founded: 17 August 1975; 51 years ago
- Dissolved: 17 June 2025; 16 months ago
- Ground: Mytilene Municipal Stadium
- Capacity: 3,000

Aiolikos Football Club (Greek: Α.E.Π.Σ. Αιολικός Μυτιλήνης) were a Greek professional association football club, based in Mytilene.

== History ==
The club was established in 1975 after a merger of two local teams – Atlantas and Apollon. The name Aiolikos was inspired by the Aeolians, the name by which the Greek inhabitants of Lesbos and nearby Aeolis, Anatolia, have been known since antiquity.

Incidentally, there was also a Greek football club called Aiolikos that was based in Smyrna (İzmir), around 1890, which would often play matches against teams of visiting British sailors. With the Greco-Turkish War (1919–1922), many of the Greek inhabitants of the region emigrated to Lesbos, taking their sporting traditions and clubs with them.

In 1976, Aiolikos participated for first time in Lesbos Football Clubs Association Championship. Ιn 1978, was promoted in National Amateur Division (today Football League 2) and in 1982, they participated in Beta Ethniki. In 1985, Aiolikos contested the promotion to Alpha Ethniki, but finally did not accomplish.

Until 1991, Aiolikos participated alternately in Gamma and Delta Ethniki. From 1991 to 1999, Aiolikos played unfailingly in Gamma Ethniki championship. Certain problems, mainly economic, led in 2000 the team again to the Lesbos Football Clubs Associations Championship for one season.

In 2001, Aiolikos was promoted in Delta Ethniki. The 2001–02 season was not good for Aiolikos, but they won on 25 May 2002, the Amateur Cup, afterwards the victory against Almopos Aridaia, final score 4–2.

In 2005, Aiolikos promoted again in Gamma Ethniki. They participated in that division until 29 December 2008, when they withdrew from 2008–09 season championship, due to unsolvable economic problems, and relegated to Delta Ethniki.

In 2023, Aiolikos participated in the promotion play-offs of Gamma Ethniki, after winning their respective group, and won promotion to Super League Greece 2.

In August 2024, Aiolikos formalized a partnership with Apollon Vounaraki, which led to Aiolikos competing in the Lesvos FCA Second Division during the 2024–25 season, winning the league title. On 17 June 2025, it was decided to dissolve the football department of Aiolikos, due to outstanding debts and establish a new club under the name A.E.P.S. "AIO" Mytilini (derived from the nickname of the club).

== Stadium ==
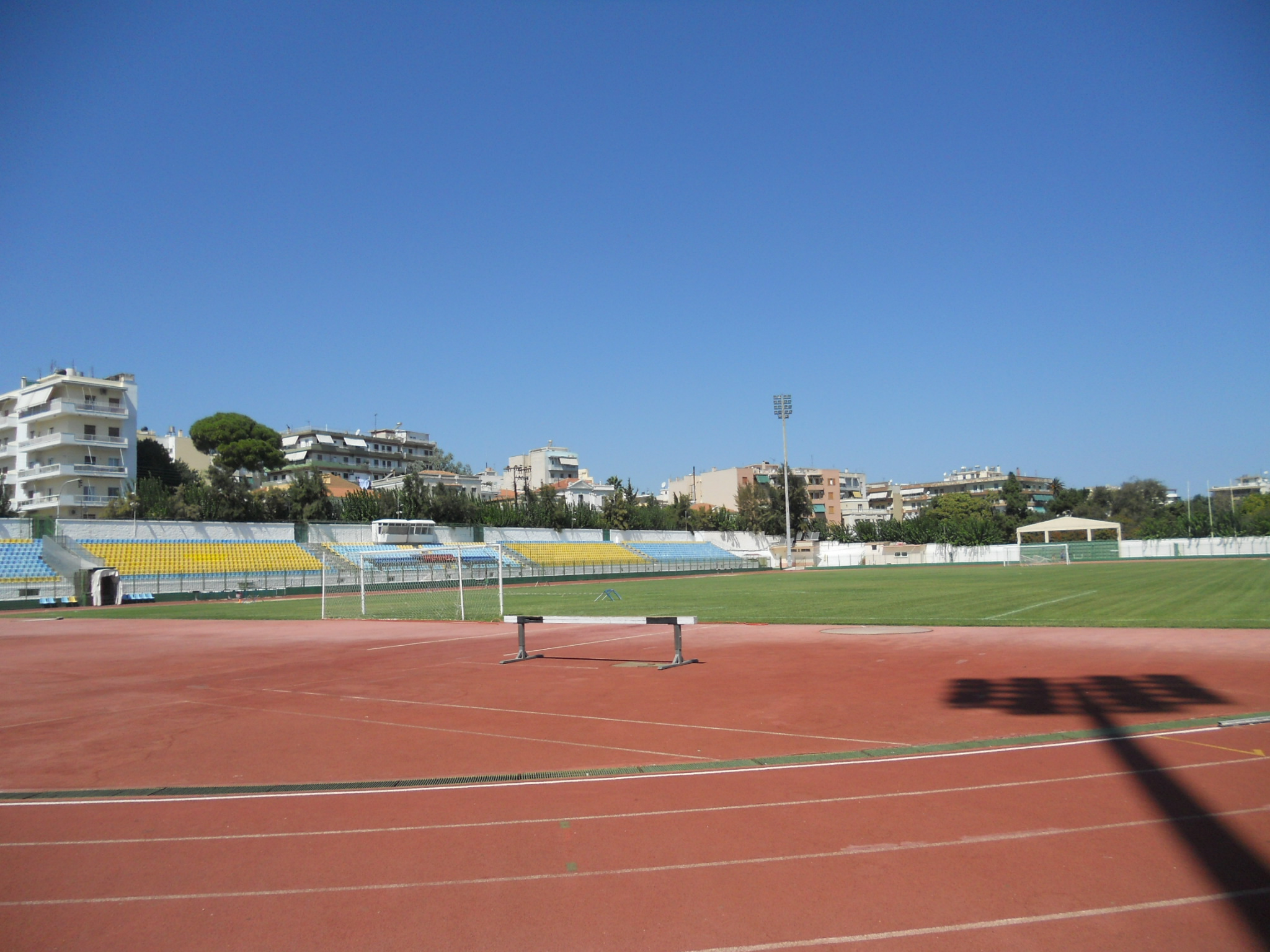
Mytilene Municipal Stadium

Mytilene Municipal Stadium is a multi-use stadium in Mytilene, Greece. It is currently used mostly for football matches and is the home stadium of Aiolikos. The stadium holds 2,850 people, all-seated.

Stadium's nickname is Tarlas (Greek: Ταρλάς), which is inspired by the old name of the settlement where stadium is built. The word is originated from another Turkish word, which means tract or field.

The stadium has four gates. It has also one big stand and track. The stand is separated in 5 sections, while there are 100 seats for VIP. In 2001 was put projectors and seats have been placed on all the stand. Until then, only a little section of the stand had seats. On the occasion of 2004 Olympic Games, have been more important projects to changing rooms and other rooms below the stand. In 2005, the placement of a shelter was decided, and in 2014, with the renovation of the stadium, it got constructed.

== Honours ==
- Third Division: 2
  - 1983–84, 2022–23
- Fourth Division: 3
  - 1981–82, 1991–92, 2004–05
- Lesbos FCA Championship: 6
  - 1963–64, 1975–76, 1976–77, 1978–79, 2000–01, 2013–14
- Amateur Cup: 2
  - 1981–82, 2001–02
- Lesbos FCA Cup: 17
  - 1975–76, 1976–77, 1979–80, 1980–81, 1981–82, 1990–91, 2000–01, 2001–02, 2002–03, 2003–04, 2004–05, 2010–11, 2011–12, 2012–13, 2013–14, 2015–16, 2017–18

== Former coaches ==
- (Greece) Fotis Kokinellis
- (Greece) Thanasis Dimitriadis
- (Greece) Charis Ghrammos
- (Greece) Michalis Grigoriou
- (Greece) Spiros Livathinos
- (Greece) Konstantinos Psyropoulos
- (Greece) Yiannis Manousos
- (Greece) Markos Mavrommatis
- (Greece) Petros Michos
- (Greece) Theodhoros Papalopoulos
- (Greece) Manolis Papamattheakis
- (Greece) Theodoros Giakalis
- (Greece) Dimitris Papaspyrou
- (Greece) Apostolos Charalampidis
- (Serbia) Slobodan Krčmarević
