= Ethnikos Asteras F.C. =

Ethnikos Asteras
- Full name: Ethnikos Asteras Kaisariani 1927
- Founded: 1927; 99 years ago
- Ground: Michalis Kritikopoulos Stadium
- Capacity: 3,205
- Chairman: Akis Kikidakis
- Manager: Georgios Tsamopoulos
- League: Gamma Ethniki
- 2025–26: Gamma Ethniki (Group 5), 5th
Home colours	Away colours	Third colours

Ethnikos Asteras F.C. (Greek: Εθνικός Aστέρας Καισαριανής 1927, the National Star) is a football club based in Kaisariani, Athens, Greece.

== History ==
The club, originally named Ethnikos Astir, was founded in 1927 from the merger of Ethnikos and Asteras Kaisariani. They participated in the Greek first division from 1998 until 2002. Ethnikos Asteras was also known as Asteras FC a name related to the Warriors, Kaisariani's ultra supporters club.

The club's colors are red and white.

== Honours ==
=== Domestic ===
- Third Division: 1
  - 1996–97
- Fourth Division: 1
  - 1991–92
- Athens FCA First Division Champions: 2
  - 1974–75, 2023–24
- Athens FCA Cup: 1
  - 2022–23

== Former players ==
- (Greece) Petros Marinakis
- (Nigeria) Ganiyu Owolabi

== Notable managers ==
- (Greece) Nikos Alefantos
- (Greece) Spyros Livathinos
- (Greece) Armandos Leimanis
