= AEL Kalloni F.C. =

AEL Kalloni
- Full name: Αθλητική Ένωση Λεκανοπεδίου Καλλονής (Athletic Union of Kalloni Basin)
- Nickname: Sardéles (Sardines)
- Short name: AELK
- Founded: 15 May 1994; 31 years ago
- Dissolved: 2017; 9 years ago
- Ground: Mytilene Municipal Stadium
- Capacity: 3,000
- 2016-17: Football League, 16th (relegated)
Home colours	Away colours	Third colours

Akadimia Podosfairou Lekanopediou Kallonis, commonly referred to Kalloni, was a Greek association football club based in Kalloni, Lesbos. They competed in the Super League Greece from 2013 to 2016.

== History ==
The club was established in 1994 after a merger of Arisvaios Kalloni (est. 1954) and Apollon Dafia (est. 1969), two clubs that had been based in villages in the wider area of Kalloni, the club's original seat.

=== 2002–03 season ===
In 2002 they promoted in Delta Ethniki but they relegated to local championship of Lesbos. Being one of the weakest club of their group and without having any professional contract, they only achieved four wins.

=== 2007–08 season ===
The advent of Prokopis Kartalis who had played at Alpha Ethniki as a player of Skoda Xanthi marks the beginning of the glorious course of the club. Kartalis emerged team's top scorer and AEL Kalloni easily won Lesbos local championship and the promotion to Delta Ethniki.

=== 2008–09 season ===
In 2008–09 season, they promoted in Delta Ethniki and, even though outsider, they came close to take the first place. They were placed in a group that also competed Athenian clubs and finished 5th.

=== 2009–10 season ===
During the 2009–2010 season AEL Kalloni, making an amazing second round and having the best defense and the second best goals for record in their group won the first place and, for the first time ever, promotion to Football League 2.

=== 2010–11 season ===
In the club's first season in a professional league, in the North Group of Football League 2, they placed 2nd, a place that led them to a mini league (play-offs) against Vyzas, the 2nd-place team of South Group, and the third-placed teams of each group, Fokikos and Iraklis Psachna. The winner of the league would be promoted in Football League. However, due to the relegation of five clubs by the previous version Football League, play-offs were not carried out, so Kalloni promoted directly with all clubs that would have competed in play-offs, Anagennisi Giannitsa and Platanias to 2011–12 Football League.

=== Kalloni seasons ===
Season	Division	Tier	Position
1994–95	Lesbos FCA Championship	V	4th
1995–96	Lesbos FCA Championship	V	1st ↑
1996–97	Delta Ethniki	IV	13th ↓
1997–98	Lesbos FCA Championship	V	2nd
1998–99	Lesbos FCA Championship	V	2nd
1999–2000	Lesbos FCA Championship	V	1st
2000–01	Lesbos FCA Championship	V	4th
2001–02	Lesbos FCA Championship	V	1st ↑
2002–03	Delta Ethniki	IV	15th ↓
2003–04	Lesbos FCA Championship	V	4th
2004–05	Lesbos FCA Championship	V	5th
2005–06	Lesbos FCA Championship	V	2nd
2006–07	Lesbos FCA Championship	V	2nd
2007–08	Lesbos FCA Championship	V	1st ↑
2008–09	Delta Ethniki	IV	5th
2009–10	Delta Ethniki	IV	1st ↑
2010–11	Football League 2	III	2nd ↑
2011–12	Football League	II	5th
2012–13	Football League	II	3rd ↑
2013–14	Super League Greece	I	12th
2014–15	Super League Greece	I	10th
2015–16	Super League Greece	I	16th ↓
2016–17	Football League	II	16th ↓

- Delta Ethniki was abolished in 2013, as it was merged with Football League 2, the third tier of the Greek football league system.

↑ Promoted	↓ Relegated

=== Greek Cup appearances ===
Season	Round	Date	Home	Away	Result
2010–11	First	4 September 2010	AEL Kalloni	Aetos Skydra	0–1
2011–12	Second	23 November 2011	Glyfada	AEL Kalloni	2–2 aet (4–5 pen)
2011–12	Fourth	20 December 2011	AEL Kalloni	Panionios	2–3 aet
2012–13	First	24 October 2012	Ethnikos Asteras	AEL Kalloni	1–1 aet (1–4 pen)
2012–13	Second	31 October 2012	Olympiacos Volos	AEL Kalloni	1–1 aet (5–3 pen)
2013–14	Second	26 September 2013	Pierikos	AEL Kalloni	1–2
2013–14	Second	31 October 2013	AEL Kalloni	Pierikos	2–2 (4–3 agg)
2013–14	Round of 16	4 December 2013	OFI	AEL Kalloni	0–1
2013–14	Round of 16	16 January 2015	AEL Kalloni	OFI	0–2 aet (1–2 agg)
2014–15	Second (group stage) (eliminated)	24 September 2014	AEL Kalloni	Tyrnavos 2005	1–1
2014–15	Second (group stage) (eliminated)	29 October 2014	Asteras Tripolis	AEL Kalloni	2–1
2014–15	Second (group stage) (eliminated)	7 January 2015	AEL Kalloni	Aiginiakos	5–0
2015–16	Second (group stage) (qualified)	28 October 2015	Asteras Tripolis	AEL Kalloni	4–0
2015–16	Second (group stage) (qualified)	3 December 2015	AEL Kalloni	Panserraikos	2–1
2015–16	Second (group stage) (qualified)	16 December 2015	Kissamikos	AEL Kalloni	1–2
2015–16	Round of 16	6 January 2016	AEL Kalloni	PAOK	2–1
2015–16	Round of 16	14 January 2016	PAOK	AEL Kalloni	3–0
2016–17	Second (group stage) (eliminated)	25 October 2016	AEL Kalloni	Agrotikos Asteras	1–2
2016–17	Second (group stage) (eliminated)	1 December 2016	Xanthi	AEL Kalloni	3–1
2016–17	Second (group stage) (eliminated)	15 December 2016	AEL Kalloni	PAS Giannina	1–3

== Crest and colours ==
=== Apollon and Arisvaios' crests ===
Apollon Dafia's crest depicted the ancient god Apollo. The club's colours were blue and white. The crest of Arisvaios Kalloni had vertical strips in green and white colour, in the center of which were shown two runners. Up and down of strips, the name of the club appeared.

=== Kalloni's original crest ===
Initially, it had been decided the colours of the new club to be green and white. After a malfunction of a printer, the green colours were printed in crimson. The executives of the club felt that this change would bring luck, so this variation was finally maintained.

There were two other variations, the one in blue and white and the other in yellow and blue.

=== New logo ===
A new crest was created in 2011 summer. It is a circle that in its interior has crimson and white vertical stripes and in its center there is a blue shield with two handshaking hands in laurel leaves at the bottom of which is written the establishment year, much like the original logo. In the exterior of the circle, the club's full name is indicated with white letters in blue background.

== Ground ==
Kalloni used the Mytilene Municipal Stadium. Until then, they used Kostas Kenteris stadium, situated in Kalloni. The stadium was built in 2002. It had one tier in its west, with a capacity about 900, all-seated. In 2010, when Kalloni promoted to Football League 2, some necessary repairs were made in order to make it appropriate for the proper conduct of matches. In 2009 a secondary field was constructed for training the first team and its academies. From 2011–12 season, the Mytilene Municipal Stadium has been made the club's home, because of the unsuitability of their physical home.

== Honours ==
=== League ===
- Football League 2 (III)

Runners-up: 2010–11

- Delta Ethniki (IV)

Winners: 2009–10

- Championship of Lesbos Football Clubs Association (V)

Winners (4): 1995–96, 1999–2000, 2001–02, 2007–08
Runners-up (4): 1997–98, 1998–99, 2005–06, 2006–07

=== Cup ===
- Cup of Lesbos Football Clubs Association

Winners (3): 1995–96, 2005–06, 2008–09
Runners-up: 2009–10

== Players ==
=== Retired numbers ===
Note: Flags indicate national team as defined under FIFA eligibility rules; some limited exceptions apply. Players may hold more than one non-FIFA nationality.

No.	Pos.	Nation	Player
8	MF	BRA	Luciano de Souza
33	MF	CZE	Jiří Kladrubský

== Club officials ==
- Owner & Chairman: (Greece) Nikos Michalakis

AEL Kalloni Football Club

- Chief executive Officer: (Greece) Prokopis Kartalis
- General manager: (Greece) Dimitris Aggelonias

Coaching and medical staff

- Head coach: (Greece) Dimitris Gavalas
- Assistant manager: TBA
- Goalkeepers' coach: (Greece) Giannis Georgiadis
- Fitness trainer: (Greece) Panagiotis Konomaras
- Club doctor: (Greece) Dimitris Varvagiannis

== Managerial history ==
- (Greece) Paraschos Laskaris (1994–96)
- (Greece) Giorgos Spartalis (1997)
- unknown (1997–98)
- (Greece) Panagiotis Pittos (1998)
- (Greece) Petros Kalogirou (1999–2000)
- (Greece) Simeon Vamvarapis (2000–01)
- unknown (2001–02)
- (Greece) Giorgos Spartalis (2002–03)
- unknown (2003–06)
- (Greece) Fotis Kokkinellis (2006)
- (Greece) Giorgos Spartalis (2007)
- (Greece) Prokopis Kartalis (2008)
- (Greece) Sotiris Antoniou (2008–10)
- (Greece) Michalis Kasapis (2010–11)
- (Greece) Sotiris Antoniou (2011)
- (Greece) Prokopis Kartalis (2011)
- (Brazil) Luciano de Souza (2011–12)
- (Greece) Giannis Matzourakis (2012)
- (Greece) Timos Kavakas (2012)
- (Greece) Loukas Karadimos (2012)
- (Greece) Babis Tennes (2012–13)
- (Greece) Giannis Matzourakis (2013–15)
- (Greece) Vangelis Vlachos (2015)
- (Greece) Thalis Theodoridis (2015)
- (Greece) Nikos Karageorgiou (2015–16)
- (Greece) Giorgos Vazakas (2016)
- (Greece) Dimitris Gavalas (2016–2017)
