= 2011–12 AE Larissa F.C. season =

AEL
2011–12 season
- Chairman: (Greece) Konstantinos Piladakis
- Manager: (Serbia) Bozidar Bandovic
- Football League: 8th
- Greek Cup: Round of 32
- Top goalscorer: League: Joël Tshibamba (7); All: Joël Tshibamba (7)
Home colours	Away colours

The 2011–12 season will be AEL's first season back in the Football League following relegation from the Super League in 2011. It is Chris Coleman's first season in charge at the club. Coleman left Larissa on 9 January 2012 citing financial problems as the reason. "Over the last two or three months I've had to compromise myself because of the financial situation and it's made me unhappy"

== Season review ==
See also 2011–12 Football League

== Transfers ==
=== Transfers in ===
First team
Date	Pos.	No.	Player	From club	Transfer fee
	MF	11	(Portugal) Luís Boa Morte	(England) West Ham United	Free
	MF	8	(Spain) Antonio González Rodríguez	(Greece) Doxa Drama	Free
	FW	9	(Democratic Republic of the Congo) Joël Tshibamba	(Poland) Lech Poznań	Undisclosed
	DF	12	(France) Cyril Kali	(Greece) Veria F.C.	Free
	FW	24	(Portugal) Zequinha	(Portugal) Olhanense	Loan
	FW	30	(Brazil) Césinha	(Romania) Rapid București	Free
3 January 2012	MF	14	(Albania) Blendi Moutsa	(Greece) Oikonomos	
22 December 2011	MF	18	(Argentina) Fabricio Poci	(Greece) Platanias	
	DF	27	(Greece) Alexandros Galitsios	(Greece) Youth Team	
January 2012	DF		(Greece) Manolis Psomas	(Greece) Levadiakos	
January 2012	FW		(Greece) Vaggelis Kaounos	(Greece) Ethnikos Asteras	
January 2012	MF		(Spain) Jorge Pina Roldán	(Spain) Andorra	
January 2012	GK		(Greece) Panagiotis Vosniadis		

=== Transfers out ===
First team
Date	Pos.	No.	Player	To club	Transfer fee
	MF		(Greece) Vasilios Rentzas	(Greece) Ergotelis F.C.	Free
	MF	11	(Turkey) Tümer Metin	(Greece) Kerkyra	End of loan
January 2012	MF	11	(Portugal) Luís Boa Morte		Free
January 2012	DF	2	(Senegal) Ibrahim Tall		Free
January 2012	MF	30	(Brazil) Césinha		Free
January 2012	MF	42	(Argentina) Walter Iglesias		Free
January 2012	GK	75	(Greece) Chrisostomos Michailidis		Free
February 2012	FW	9	(Democratic Republic of the Congo) Joël Tshibamba	Krylia Sovetov	Loan

== Squad ==
=== Current squad ===
Updated 23 February 2012 Note: Flags indicate national team as defined under FIFA eligibility rules; some limited exceptions apply. Players may hold more than one non-FIFA nationality.

No.	Pos.	Nation	Player
1	GK	GRE	Dimitris Sotiriou
3	DF	GRE	Stelios Venetidis (captain)
4	DF	GRE	Nikos Arabatzis
5	MF	GRE	Kostas Chatzis
6	MF	GRE	Kostas Nebegleras (2nd captain)
7	MF	GRE	Dimitris Pliagas
8	MF	ESP	Toni González
10	FW	FRA	Yohann Lasimant
11	MF	ESP	Jorge Pina
13	DF	BEL	Naim Aarab
14	MF	ALB	Bledi Muca
15	GK	ALB	Dimitri-Erind Prifti
17	FW	GRE	Antonis Vouzas
18	MF	ARG	Fabricio Poci
19	FW	BEL	Roddy Kambala

No.	Pos.	Nation	Player
20	DF	GRE	Nikos Karanikas
22	FW	GRE	Dimitris Hasomeris
23	DF	GRE	Lazaros Fotias
24	FW	POR	Zequinha
26	DF	GRE	Dimitris Kolovetsios
27	DF	GRE	Alexandros Galitsios
29	DF	POR	Bruno Pereira (4th-captain)
30	GK	GRE	Panagiotis Vosniadis
33	DF	GRE	Thanassis Papageorgiou
44	FW	SRB	Nikola Grubješić
55	DF	GRE	Manolis Psomas
77	DF	GRE	Panagiotis Katsiaros (3rd captain)
79	FW	GRE	Vangelis Kaounos
88	MF	GRE	Antonis Tsiaras
92	MF	GRE	Savas Siatravanis

==== Out on loan ====
Note: Flags indicate national team as defined under FIFA eligibility rules; some limited exceptions apply. Players may hold more than one non-FIFA nationality.

No.	Pos.	Nation	Player
71	GK	GRE	Christos Batavanis (to (Greece) A.S. Pyrgetos)
9	FW	COD	Joël Tshibamba (to (Russia) FC Krylia Sovetov Samara)

== Competitions ==
=== Football League ===
See also 2011–12 Football League

==== Results summary ====
Overall								Home						Away					
Pld	W	D	L	GF	GA	GD	Pts	W	D	L	GF	GA	GD	W	D	L	GF	GA	GD
34	10	11	13	38	31	+7	41	7	8	3	27	17	+10	3	3	10	11	14	−3

Last updated: 24 April 2012.
Source: Soccerway

==== Results by round ====
Round	1	2	3	4	5	6	7	8	9	10	11	12	13	14	15	16	17	18	19	20	21	22	23	24	25	26	27	28	29	30	31	32	33	34
Ground	H	A	H	H	H	A	A	H	A	H	A	H	A	A	H	A	H	A	H	A	A	A	H	A	H	H	A	H	A	H	H	A	H	A
Result	D	W	D	D	W	D	L	W	W	W	L	L	L	L	W	L	D	D	L	L	L	L	W	L	D	W	W	D	D	W	L	D	W	L
Position	10	10	10	9	7	8	8	5	4	4	4	5	5	7	5	7	8	8	12	12	12	12	10	10	10	10	10	10	10	10	10	10	9	10

Source: Soccerway
A = Away; H = Home; W = Win; D = Draw; L = Loss

==== Fixtures & results ====
12 November 2011 1	AEL	0–0	Vyzas	AEL FC Arena
		Summary	Stratakis (yellow card) 22' (yellow-red card) 39'

20 November 2011 2	Veria	0–3	AEL	Veria Stadium
		Summary	Kolovetsios 23'; Tshibamba 30'; Césinha 69'

27 November 2011 3	AEL	0–0	Pierikos	AEL FC Arena
		Summary

30 November 2011 4	AEL	0–0	Iraklis Psachna	AEL FC Arena
		Summary

4 December 2011 5	AEL	2–1	Panachaiki	AEL FC Arena
	Zequinha 10'; Césinha 41'; Arabatzis (yellow card) 27' (yellow-red card) 60'	Summary	Kyvelidis 86'

11 December 2011 6	Ethnikos Asteras	0–0	AEL	Michalis Kritikopoulos Stadium
		Summary

14 December 2011 7	Panserraikos	2–1	AEL	Serres Municipal Stadium
	Gomez 40'; Tsaousis 85'	Summary	Tshibamba 54'

18 December 2011 8	AEL	5–2	Anagennisi Epanomi	AEL FC Arena
	Tshibamba 28', 64', 68'; Saitiotis 86', 90'	Summary	Gesios 45'; Dinopapas 61'

3 January 2012 9	Anagennisi Giannitsa	0–3	AEL	Giannitsa Stadium
		Summary	Tshibamba 26', 83'; Chatzis 45'; Chatzis (yellow card) 58' (yellow-red card) 78'

8 January 2012 10	AEL	1–0	Diagoras	AEL FC Arena
	Hasomeris 23'	Summary

14 January 2012 11	AEL Kalloni	1–0	AEL	Kostas Kenteris Stadium
	Leozinho 32' (pen.)	Summary

22 January 2012 12	AEL	0–1	Platanias	AEL FC Arena
	Aarab (red card) 66'	Summary	Maragoudakis 55'

25 January 2012 13	Panthrakikos	1–0	AEL	OPAP-Municipal Komotini Stadium
	Goniadis 86'	Summary

29 January 2012 14	Kallithea	1–0	AEL	Gregoris Lambrakis Stadium
	Maroukakis 15'	Summary

19 February 2012 15	AEL	2–1	Thrasyvoulos	AEL FC Arena
	Kaounos 45'; Nebegleras 90'	Summary	Fillip 51'

26 February 2012 16	Agrotikos Asteras	1–0	AEL	Agrotikos Asteras Ground
	Karakatsanis 77'	Summary

3 March 2012 17	AEL	0–0	Fokikos	AEL FC Arena
		Summary

10 March 2012 18	Iraklis Psachna	0–0	AEL	Local Stadium of Psachna
		Summary

14 March 2012 19	AEL	0–1	Panserraikos	AEL FC Arena
	Grubješić (red card) 71'	Summary	Diogo 74'

19 March 2012 20	Vyzas	1–0	AEL	Megara Stadium
	El Ela 90'	Summary

28 March 2012 21	Pierikos	2–1	AEL	Municipal Stadium of Katerini
	Konteon 50'; Koutsospiros 80'; Koutsospiros (red card) 81'	Summary	Zequinha 19'

1 April 2012 22	Panachaiki	2–0	AEL	Kostas Davourlis Stadium
	M'Pia 44'; Furtado 50'	Summary

4 April 2012 23	AEL	2–0	Ethnikos Asteras	AEL FC Arena
	Zequinha 3' (pen.); Blendi 62'	Summary

8 April 2012 24	Anagennisi Epanomi	1–0	AEL	Nikos Sarafis Stadium
	Georgiou 75'	Summary

11 April 2012 25	AEL	2–2	Veria	AEL FC Arena
	Kaounos 13'; Zequinha 68' (pen.)	Summary	Kadi 42', 53'

22 April 2012 26	AEL	4–1	Anagennisi Giannitsa	AEL FC Arena
15:00	Zequinha 2' (pen.), 35' (yellow card) 83'; Kaounos 25'; Kolovetsios 83'	Summary	Giannis Seretis (yellow card) 6'; Konstantinos Tsiknidis (yellow card) 30'; Rovinson Beka 77'

24 April 2012 27	Diagoras	0–3 ((w/o))^{1}	AEL	Diagoras Stadium
		Summary

29 April 2012 28	AEL	1–1	AEL Kalloni	AEL FC Arena
	Papageorgiou 33'	Summary	Manousakis 33'

2 May 2012 29	Platanias	0–0	AEL	Maleme Stadium
		Summary

9 May 2012 30	AEL	3–2	Panthrakikos	AEL FC Arena
	Nebegleras 12' (pen.); Kaounos 27', 48'	Summary	Mingas 31'; Soultanidis 66'

13 May 2012 31	AEL	0–1	Kallithea	AEL FC Arena
	Katsiaros (red card) 90+2'	Summary	Farinola 63'

15 May 2012 32	Thrasyvoulos	1–1	AEL	Fyli Stadium
	D'Akol 22'	Summary	Tsiaras 70'; Psomas (red card) 79'

19 May 2012 33	AEL	4–1	Agrotikos Asteras	AEL FC Arena
	Grubješić 70'; Venetidis 74'; Pliagas 87'; Papageorgiou 89'	Summary	Karakatsanis 44'

23 May 2012 34	Fokikos	2–0	AEL	Dimotiko Stadio
	Kallergis 57'; Diamantopoulos 75' (pen.)	Summary

==== League table ====
Pos	Team	Pld	W	D	L	GF	GA	GD	Pts
8	Pierikos	34	16	7	11	41	30	+11	55
9	Anagennisi Epanomi	34	13	5	16	42	46	−4	44
10	AEL	34	11	10	13	38	29	+9	43
11	Iraklis Psachna	34	10	12	12	29	23	+6	42
12	Thrasyvoulos	34	11	9	14	37	40	−3	42

Source: Football League standings (in Greek)
Rules for classification: 1) points; 2) goal difference; 3) number of goals scored.

=== Greek Cup ===
See also 2011–12 Greek Cup

23 November 2011 Second round	Rouvas	0–1	AEL	Heraklion
15:00		[ Report]	Pliagas 28'	Stadium: Theodoros Vardinogiannis Stadium

21 December 2011 Round of 32	AEL	0–0 (a.e.t.) (9–10 p)	Panetolikos	Larissa
		Summary		Stadium: AEL FC Arena
	Penalties
	Zequinha (penalty scored); Saitiotis (penalty scored); Aarab (penalty scored); Hasomeris (penalty scored); Tshibamba (penalty missed); Chatzis (penalty scored); Césinha (penalty scored); Tall (penalty scored); Katsiaros (penalty scored); Arabatzis (penalty scored); Sotiriou (penalty missed)		(penalty scored) Theodoridis; (penalty scored) Charisteas; (penalty missed) Edjenguélé; (penalty scored) Rocha; (penalty scored) Mitropoulos; (penalty scored) Camara; (penalty scored) Karamalikis; (penalty scored) Kousas; (penalty scored) Paleologos; (penalty scored) Anastasiadis; (penalty scored) Cennamo

== Squad statistics ==
=== Appearances and goals ===
As of 21 May 2012

No.	Pos	Nat	Player	Total		Football League		Greek Cup	
No.	Pos	Nat	Player	Apps	Goals	Apps	Goals	Apps	Goals
1	GK	(Greece) GRE	Dimitrios Sotiriou	27	0	25+1	0	1+0	0
3	DF	(Greece) GRE	Stylianos Venetidis	13	1	10+3	1	0+0	0
4	DF	(Greece) GRE	Nikos Arabatzis	11	0	9+1	0	1+0	0
5	MF	(Greece) GRE	Konstantinos Chatzis	26	1	20+5	1	1+0	0
6	MF	(Greece) GRE	Konstantinos Nebegleras	23	2	23+0	2	0+0	0
7	MF	(Greece) GRE	Dimitris Pliagas	17	3	8+8	2	1+0	1
8	MF	(Spain) ESP	Antonio González Rodríguez	15	0	12+3	0	0+0	0
10	FW	(France) FRA	Yohann Lasimant	8	0	2+6	0	0+0	0
11	MF	(Spain) ESP	Jorge Pina Roldán	7	0	3+4	0	0+0	0
13	DF	(Belgium) BEL	Naim Aarab	13	0	10+2	0	1+0	0
14	MF	(Albania) ALB	Blendi Moutsa	7	1	7+0	1	0+0	0
17	FW	(Greece) GRE	Antonios Vouzas	14	0	7+6	0	1+0	0
18	MF	(Argentina) ARG	Fabricio Poci	12	0	11+1	0	0+0	0
20	DF	(Greece) GRE	Nikos Karanikas	15	0	11+4	0	0+0	0
22	FW	(Greece) GRE	Dimitris Chasomeris	20	1	11+8	1	0+1	0
23	DF	(Greece) GRE	Lazaros Fotias	3	0	0+3	0	0+0	0
24	FW	(Portugal) POR	Zequinha	21	6	12+8	6	1+0	0
26	DF	(Greece) GRE	Dimitrios Kolovetsios	25	3	25+0	3	0+0	0
27	DF	(Greece) GRE	Alexandros Galitsios	2	0	0+2	0	0+0	0
30	GK	(Greece) GRE	Panagiotis Vosniadis	3	0	3+0	0	0+0	0
33	DF	(Greece) GRE	Athanasios Papageorgiou	20	1	19+1	1	0+0	0
44	FW	(Serbia) SRB	Nikola Grubješić	11	1	7+4	1	0+0	0
55	FW	(Greece) GRE	Manolis Psomas	17	0	17+0	0	0+0	0
71	FW	(Greece) GRE	Alexandros Karachalios	1	0	0+1	0	0+0	0
77	DF	(Greece) GRE	Panagiotis Katsiaros	17	0	16+0	0	1+0	0
79	FW	(Greece) GRE	Vaggelis Kaounos	13	5	9+4	5	0+0	0
88	MF	(Greece) GRE	Antonis Tsiaras	1	1	0+1	1	0+0	0
92	MF	(Greece) GRE	Savas Siatravanis	13	0	8+5	0	0+0	0
99	FW	(Greece) GRE	Georgios Saitiotis	13	2	8+4	2	0+1	0
Players who left Larissa on loan during the season:
9	FW	(Democratic Republic of the Congo) COD	Joël Tshibamba	14	7	9+4	7	1+0	0
Players who appeared for Larissa no longer at the club:
2	DF	(Senegal) SEN	Ibrahim Tall	7	0	6+0	0	1+0	0
11	FW	(Portugal) POR	Luís Boa Morte	8	0	7+0	0	1+0	0
12	DF	(France) FRA	Cyril Kali	5	0	5+0	0	0+0	0
30	MF	(Brazil) BRA	Césinha	8	2	7+0	2	0+1	0
75	GK	(Greece) GRE	Chrisostomos Michailidis	2	0	2+0	0	0+0	0

=== Top scorers ===
As of 15 May 2012

Place	Position	Nation	Number	Name	Football League	Greek Cup	Super Cup	Total
1	FW	(Democratic Republic of the Congo)	9	Joël Tshibamba	7	0	0	7
2	MF	(Portugal)	24	Zequinha	6	0	0	6
3	FW	(Greece)	79	Vaggelis Kaounos	5	0	0	5
4	DF	(Greece)	26	Dimitrios Kolovetsios	3	0	0	3
5	MF	(Brazil)	30	Césinha	2	0	0	2
=	FW	(Greece)	99	Georgios Saitiotis	2	0	0	2
=	MF	(Greece)	6	Konstantinos Nebegleras	2	0	0	2
=	MF	(Greece)	7	Dimitris Pliagas	1	1	0	2
9	DF	(Greece)	5	Konstantinos Chatzis	1	0	0	1
=	FW	(Greece)	22	Dimitris Hasomeris	1	0	0	1
=	MF	(Albania)	14	Blendi Moutsa	1	0	0	1
=	DF	(Greece)	33	Athanasios Papageorgiou	1	0	0	1
=	DF	(Greece)	3	Stelios Venetidis	1	0	0	1
=	FW	(Serbia)	44	Nikola Grubješić	1	0	0	1
=	MF	(Greece)	88	Antonis Tsiaras	1	0	0	1
=				Awarded Goals	3	0	0	3
				TOTALS	38	1	0	39

=== Disciplinary record ===
As of 15 May 2012

Number	Nation	Position	Name	Football League		Greek Cup		Total	
Number	Nation	Position	Name	Yellow card	Red card	Yellow card	Red card	Yellow card	Red card
1	(Greece)	GK	Dimitrios Sotiriou	2	0	0	0	2	0
3	(Greece)	DF	Stylianos Venetidis	1	0	0	0	1	0
4	(Greece)	MF	Nikos Arabatzis	2	1	0	0	2	1
5	(Greece)	MF	Konstantinos Chatzis	5	1	1	0	6	1
6	(Greece)	MF	Konstantinos Nebegleras	5	0	0	0	5	0
7	(Greece)	DF	Dimitris Pliagas	2	0	0	0	2	0
8	(Spain)	MF	Antonio González Rodríguez	4	0	0	0	4	0
9	(Democratic Republic of the Congo)	FW	Joël Tshibamba	4	0	1	0	5	0
11	(Portugal)	MF	Luís Boa Morte	2	0	0	0	2	0
12	(France)	DF	Cyril Kali	2	0	0	0	2	0
13	(Belgium)	DF	Naim Aarab	3	0	0	0	3	0
17	(Greece)	FW	Antonios Vouzas	2	0	0	0	2	0
18	(Argentina)	MF	Fabricio Poci	4	0	0	0	4	0
20	(Greece)	DF	Nikos Karanikas	4	0	0	0	4	0
24	(Portugal)	FW	Zequinha	6	0	0	0	6	0
26	(Greece)	DF	Dimitrios Kolovetsios	5	0	0	0	5	0
27	(Greece)	DF	Alexandros Galitsios	1	0	0	0	1	0
30	(Brazil)	MF	Césinha	1	0	1	0	2	0
33	(Greece)	MF	Athanasios Papageorgiou	2	0	0	0	2	0
44	(Serbia)	FW	Nikola Grubješić	1	1	0	0	1	1
55	(Greece)	MF	Manolis Psomas	4	1	0	0	4	1
75	(Greece)	GK	Chrisostomos Michailidis	1	0	0	0	1	0
77	(Greece)	DF	Panagiotis Katsiaros	4	1	0	0	4	1
92	(Greece)	MF	Savas Siatravanis	1	0	0	0	1	0
			TOTALS	68	5	3	0	71	5

Last updated: 9 January 2012
Source: Match reports in Results

== Sponsor ==
- OPAP
