= 2011–12 Greek Football Cup =

2011–12 Greek Cup
Tournament details
- Country: Greece
- Teams: 57

Final positions
- Champions: Olympiacos (25th title)
- Runners-up: Atromitos

Tournament statistics
- Matches played: 56
- Goals scored: 110 (1.96 per match)
- Top goal scorer(s): Marko Pantelić (6 goals)

The 2011–12 Greek Football Cup was the 70th edition of the Greek Football Cup. A total of 57 clubs, ten less than in the last edition, were accepted to enter. The competition commenced on 9 November 2011 with the first round and concluded in April 2012 with the final between Olympiacos and Atromitos, with Olympiacos winning 2–1 in extra time. The delay of the start of the tournament was due to judicial decisions after the Koriopolis scandal.

== Teams ==
Round	Clubs remaining	Clubs involved	Winners from previous round	New entries	Leagues entering
First round	57	10	none	10	Football League 2
Second round	52	36	5	31	Football League
Additional round	34	4	4	none	none
Round of 32	32	32	14 from second round & 2 from additional round	16	Super League
Round of 16	16	16	16	none	none
Quarter-finals	8	8	8	none	none
Semi-finals	4	4	4	none	none
Final	2	2	2	none	none

== Calendar ==
Round	Date(s)	Fixtures	Clubs	New entries
First round	9, 13 November 2011	5	57 → 52	10
Second round	22–24 November 2011	18	52 → 34	31
Additional round	7 December 2011	2	34 → 32	none
Round of 32	20–22 December 2011	16	32 → 16	16
Round of 16	11–12, 17–19 January 2012	8	16 → 8	none
Quarter-finals	25 January, 22 February 2012	4	8 → 4	none
Semi-finals	21 March, 4 April 2012	2	4 → 2	none
Final	25 April 2012	1	2 → 1	none

== Participating clubs ==
The following 57 teams competed in the first round:

2011–12 Super League	2011–12 Football League	2011–12 Football League 2
AEK Athens; Aris; Asteras Tripolis; Atromitos; Doxa Drama; Ergotelis; Kerkyra; Levadiakos; OFI; Olympiacos; Panathinaikos; Panetolikos; Panionios; PAOK; PAS Giannina; Skoda Xanthi	AEL; AEL Kalloni; Agrotikos Asteras; Anagennisi Epanomi; Anagennisi Giannitsa; Diagoras; Ethnikos Asteras; Fokikos; Iraklis Psachna; Kallithea; Panachaiki; Panserraikos; Panthrakikos; Platanias; Pierikos; Thrasyvoulos; Veria; Vyzas Megara	Aetos Skydra; Apollon Kalamarias; Apollon Athens; Asteras Magoula; Chania; Doxa Kranoula; Ethnikos Gazoros; Glyfada; Ilisiakos; Kalamata; Megas Alexandros Irakleia; Niki Volos; Odysseas Anagennisi; Oikonomos Tsaritsani; Paniliakos; Pontioi Katerini; Proodeftiki; PAO Rouf; Rouvas; Tilikratis; Tyrnavos 2005; Vataniakos; Zakynthos

== Knockout phase ==
Each tie in the knockout phase, apart from the quarter-finals and the semi-finals, was played as a single match. If the score was level at the end of normal time, extra time was played, followed by a penalty shoot-out if the score was still level. The quarter-finals and the semi-finals were played over two legs, with each team playing one leg at home. The team that scored more goals on aggregate over the two legs advanced to the next round. If the aggregate score was level, the away goals rule was applied, i.e. the team that scored more goals away from home over the two legs advanced. If away goals were also equal, then extra time was played. The away goals rule was again applied after extra time, i.e. if there were goals scored during extra time and the aggregate score was still level, the visiting team advanced by virtue of more away goals scored. If no goals were scored during extra time, the winners were decided by a penalty shoot-out. In the round of 16, if the score was level at the end of normal time the two-legged rule was applied.
The mechanism of the draws for each round is as follows:

- In the draw for the second round, the teams from the second division are seeded and the winners from the first round were unseeded. The seeded teams are drawn against the unseeded teams.
- In the draw for the Round of 32, the teams from the first division are seeded and the winners from the second round were unseeded. The seeded teams are drawn against the unseeded teams.
- In the draws for the Round of 16 onwards, there are no seedings and teams from the different group can be drawn against each other.

== First round ==
The draw for this round took place on 2 November 2011.

=== Summary ===
Team 1	Score	Team 2
9 November 2011
PAO Rouf	1–0	Chania
Oikonomos Tsaritsani	2–2 (5–4 p)	Tilikratis
Apollon Athens	4–2	Paniliakos
Asteras Magoula	1–0	Ilisiakos
13 November 2011
Ethnikos Gazoros	0–1	Aetos Skydra
N/A
Apollon Kalamarias	bye	
Doxa Kranoula	bye	
Glyfada	bye	
Kalamata	bye	
Megas Alexandros Irakleia	bye	
Niki Volos	bye	
Odysseas Anagennisi	bye	
Pontioi Katerini	bye	
Proodeutiki	bye	
Rouvas	bye	
Tyrnavos 2005	bye	
Vataniakos	bye	
Zakynthos	bye	

=== Matches ===
9 November 2011
14:15 EET

PAO Rouf	1–0	Chania
Manias 29'	Report

Rouf Municipal Stadium, Rouf
Referee: Georgios Tzovaras (Phthiotis)

9 November 2011
14:15 EET

Oikonomos Tsaritsani	2–2 (a.e.t.)	Tilikratis
Floros 82'; Nikoulis 121' (pen.)	Report	Albanis 86'; Gogas 118' (pen.)
Penalties
Banousis (penalty scored); Oikonomou (penalty scored); Kerry (penalty scored); Floros (penalty scored); Nikoulis (penalty missed); Poutas (penalty scored)	5–4	(penalty missed) Ntoutsaridis; (penalty scored) Roussis; (penalty scored) Iasonidis; (penalty scored) Poutachidis; (penalty scored) Gogas; (penalty missed) Myroforidis

Georgios Mitsibonas Stadium, Tsaritsani
Referee: Isaak Tsakalidis (Chalkidiki)

9 November 2011
17:00 EET

Apollon Athens	4–2	Paniliakos
Diamantis 37', 89'; Kiskabanis 55'; Korovesis 70'	Report	Krystallis 34'; Kyriakidis 76'

Georgios Kamaras Stadium, Rizoupoli
Referee: Dimitrios Stathopoulos (West Attica)

9 November 2011
17:30 EET

Asteras Magoula	1–0	Ilisiakos
Serepas 86'	Report

Eleusina Municipal Stadium, Eleusina
Referee: Konstantinos Karyofillis (Piraeus)

13 November 2011
14:15 EET

Ethnikos Gazoros	0–1	Aetos Skydra
	Report	Karagiannis 12'

Serres Municipal Stadium, Serres
Referee: Agisilaos Boumarsopoulos (Larissa)

== Second round ==
The draw for took place on 10 November 2011.

=== Summary ===
Team 1	Score	Team 2
22 November 2011
Apollon Kalamarias	1–2	Anagennisi Epanomi
Oikonomos Tsaritsani	1–1 (4–5 p)	Panserraikos
Proodeftiki	1–0	Anagennisi Giannitsa
23 November 2011
Apollon Athens	0–2	Panthrakikos
Asteras Magoula	2–4 (a.e.t.)	Kallithea
Vataniakos	0–1	Agrotikos Asteras
Doxa Kranoula	2–2 (3–4 p)	Panachaiki
Zakynthos	0–1	Pierikos
Kalamata	0–0 (3–0 p)	Fokikos
Glyfada	2–2 (4–5 p)	Kalloni
Megas Alexandros Irakleia	0–2	Ethnikos Asteras
Niki Volos	0–1	Thrasyvoulos
Pontioi Katerini	1–0	Vyzas
Rouvas	0–1	AEL
Tyrnavos 2005	0–2	Veria
Aetos Skydra	1–0	Iraklis Psachna
24 November 2011
Odysseas Anagennisi	0–0 (3–4 p)	Platanias
PAO Rouf	0–0 (2–4 p)	Diagoras

=== Matches ===
22 November 2011
19:00 EET

Apollon Kalamarias	1–2	Anagennisi Epanomi
Sullivan 50'	Report	Gesios 16'; Tássio 85'

Kalamaria Stadium, Thessaloniki
Referee: Dimitrios Maloutas (Imathia)

22 November 2011
14:00 EET

Oikonomos Tsaritsani	1–1 (a.e.t.)	Panserraikos
Moutsa 17'	Report	Gourtsas 22' (pen.)
Penalties
Banousis (penalty scored); Oikonomou (penalty scored); Floros (penalty missed); Karabelas (penalty scored); Nikoulis (penalty scored)	4–5	(penalty scored) Milenković; (penalty scored) Gomez; (penalty scored) Soares; (penalty scored) Diogo; (penalty scored) Stefanidis

Georgios Mitsibonas Stadium, Tsaritsani
Referee: Dinoysios Zougras (Kozani)

22 November 2011
14:00 EET

Proodeftiki	1–0	Anagennisi Giannitsa
Samios 60'	Report

Nikaia Municipal Gymnasium, Nikaia
Referee: Symeon Kosikidis (Athens)

23 November 2011
17:00 EET

Apollon Athens	0–2	Panthrakikos
	Report	Soultanidis 12', 51'

Georgios Kamaras Stadium, Rizoupoli
Referee: Aristeidis Vatsios (West Attica)

23 November 2011
17:00 EET

Asteras Magoula	2–4 (a.e.t.)	Kallithea
Tsoupros 30', 90+5'	Report	Maroukakis 1'; Kaltsas 77'; Stavrou 115'; Platellas 120'

Eleusina Municipal Stadium, Eleusina
Referee: Nikolaos Ratsiatos (Argolida)

23 November 2011
14:00 EET

Vataniakos	0–1	Agrotikos Asteras
	Report	Stefanidis 73'

Vataniakos Μunicipal Stadium, Katerini
Referee: Manolis Skoulas (Thessaly)

23 November 2011
14:00 EET

Doxa Kranoula	2–2 (a.e.t.)	Panachaiki
Gaidartzis 10'; Kokkinis 40' (o.g.)	Report	Kyvelidis 9'; Dinas 75'
Penalties
Papavasiliou (penalty scored); Krol (penalty missed); Gaidartzis (penalty scored); Kotsinas (penalty scored); Giakos (penalty missed)	3–4	(penalty scored) Ioannou; (penalty scored) Kokkinis; (penalty scored) Atmatsidis; (penalty scored) Koiliaras

Kranoula Stadium, Ioannina
Referee: Vasilios Panagiotopoulos (Aetoloacarnania)

23 November 2011
14:00 EET

Zakynthos	0–1	Pierikos
	Report	Konteon 64'

Zakynthians Olympic Champions Ground, Zakynthos
Referee: Georgios Blanas (Messinia)

23 November 2011
14:00 EET

Kalamata	0–0 (a.e.t.)	Fokikos
	Report
Penalties
Daskalakis (penalty scored); Athanasopoulos (penalty scored); Tsagarakis (penalty scored)	3–0	(penalty missed) Nikoltsis; (penalty missed) Kostopoulos; (penalty missed) Dimitris

Messiniakos Stadium, Kalamata
Referee: Nikolaos Anousos (Laconia)

23 November 2011
14:00 EET

Glyfada	2–2 (a.e.t.)	Kalloni
Karachalios 49'; Tsamourlidis 115'	Report	Kripintiris 74'; Leozinho 109'
Penalties
Tsoutsis (penalty missed); Kolotouros (penalty scored); Kazantzis (penalty scored); Tsamourlidis (penalty scored); Petropoulos (penalty missed); ? (penalty scored); Pararas (penalty missed)	4–5	(penalty scored) Leozinho; (penalty missed) Manousos; (penalty scored) Kripintiris; (penalty scored) Marcelo; (penalty missed) Manousakis; (penalty scored) Chatzopoulos; (penalty scored) Karakostas

Helliniko Stadium, Ellinikon
Referee: Evaggelos Kordolaimis (Piraeus)

23 November 2011
14:00 EET

Megas Alexandros Irakleia	0–2	Ethnikos Asteras
	Report	Chorianopoulos 50'; Chaikalis 90+1'

Irakleia Municipal Stadium, Irakleia
Referee: Panagiotis Simeonidis (Pieria)

23 November 2011
14:00 EET

Niki Volos	0–1	Thrasyvoulos
	Report	Karlopoulos 70'

Pantelis Magoulas Stadium, Volos
Referee: Chrysovalantis Vrakas (Euboea)

23 November 2011
17:00 EET

Pontioi Katerini	1–0	Vyzas
Mouratidis 21'	Report

Athletic Center of Municipality of Katerini, Katerini
Referee: Athanasios Tzilos (Larissa)

23 November 2011
15:00 EET

Rouvas	0–1	AEL
	Report	Pliagas 28'

Theodoros Vardinogiannis Stadium, Heraklion
Referee: Georgios Chatzis (West Attica)

23 November 2011
14:00 EET

Tyrnavos 2005	0–2	Veria
	Report	Tadić 52'; Kaltsas 66'

Tyrnavos Municipal Stadium, Tyrnavos
Referee: Ioannis Sosonis (Phthiotis)

23 November 2011
14:00 EET

Aetos Skydra	1–0	Iraklis Psachna
Iordanidis 84'	Report

Skydra Municipal Stadium, Skydra
Referee: Konstantinos Galatsos (Macedonia)

24 November 2011
14:00 EET

Odysseas Anagennisi	0–0 (a.e.t.)	Platanias
	Report
Penalties
Maganas (penalty scored); Kosmas (penalty missed); Drouzas (penalty scored); Gagas (penalty scored); Blatseris (penalty missed)	3–4	(penalty scored) Mirčeta; (penalty scored) Gonzalez; (penalty scored) Kourtetsiotis; (penalty scored) Nazlidis; (penalty missed) Maragoudakis

Anagennisi Municipal Gymnasium, Anagennisi
Referee: Aggelos Aggelakis (Macedonia)

24 November 2011
14:00 EET

PAO Rouf	0–0 (a.e.t.)	Diagoras
	Report
Penalties
Kokkolakis (penalty scored); Kafes (penalty scored); Spyridakis (penalty missed); Liolios (penalty missed)	2–4	(penalty missed) Vukajlović; (penalty scored) Fabinho; (penalty scored) Poulopoulos; (penalty scored) Roussos; (penalty scored) Moustafidis

Rouf Municipal Stadium, Rouf
Referee: Athanasios Bortzaris (Achaea)

== Additional round ==
The draw took place on 10 November 2011.

=== Summary ===
Team 1	Score	Team 2
7 December 2011
Aetos Skydra	0–1	Pierikos
Kallithea	1–0	Veria

=== Matches ===
7 December 2011
14:00 EET

Aetos Skydra	0–1	Pierikos
	Report	Pourtoulidis 25'

Skydra Municipal Stadium, Skydra
Referee: Georgios Papageorgiou (Arta)

7 December 2011
16:00 EET

Kallithea	1–0	Veria
Platellas 90+4'	Report

Grigoris Lambrakis Stadium, Kallithea
Referee: Konstantinos Ioannidis (Argolida)

== Bracket ==
Round of 32
Ethnikos Asteras	0
PAOK (w/o)	3
Kalamata	0
AEK Athens	1
Anagennisi Epanomi	2
Atromitos	3
Panthrakikos	1
Aris	2
Diagoras	0
PAS Giannina	1
Proodeftiki	0
Asteras Tripolis	5
Platanias	0
Kerkyra	3
Kallithea	0
Doxa Drama	1
Pierikos	1
Olympiacos	3
Thrasyvoulos (p)	1(4)
Levadiakos	1(2)
Kalloni	2
Panionios (a.e.t.)	3
Agrotikos Asteras	0
Panathinaikos	1
AEL	0 (9)
Panetolikos (p)	0(10)
Panachaiki	0
OFI (a.e.t.)	1
Pontioi Katerini	0
Skoda Xanthi	2
Panserraikos (a.e.t.)	1
Ergotelis	0

Round of 16
PAOK	2
AEK Athens	0
Atromitos	2
Aris	1
PAS Giannina	1
Asteras Tripolis	4
Kerkyra	2
Doxa Drama	0
Olympiacos	3
Thrasyvoulos	0
Panionios (p)	0(4)
Panathinaikos	0(3)
Panetolikos	1
OFI	3
Skoda Xanthi	1
Panserraikos	2

Quarter-finals
PAOK	1
Atromitos (a.e.t.)	2
Asteras Tripolis	1
Kerkyra	0
Olympiacos	4
Panionios	0
OFI	3
Panserraikos	0

Semi-finals
Atromitos (a)	0	2	2
Asteras Tripolis	0	2	2
Olympiacos	1	0	1
OFI	0	0	0

Final
Atromitos	1
Olympiacos (a.e.t.)	2

== Round of 32 ==
The draw took place on 10 November 2011.

=== Summary ===
Team 1	Score	Team 2
Anagennisi Epanomi	2–3	Atromitos
Panthrakikos	1–2	Aris
Agrotikos Asteras	0–1	Panathinaikos
Panachaiki	0–1 (a.e.t.)	OFI
Kalamata	0–1	AEK Athens
Kalloni	2–3 (a.e.t.)	Panionios
Ethnikos Asteras	0–3 (w/o)	PAOK
Thrasyvoulos	1–1 (4–2 p)	Levadiakos
Platanias	0–3	Kerkyra
Panserraikos	1–0 (a.e.t.)	Ergotelis
Pontioi Katerini	0–2	Skoda Xanthi
Proodeftiki	0–5	Asteras Tripolis
AEL	0–0 (9–10 p)	Panetolikos
Diagoras	0–1	PAS Giannina
Pierikos	1–3	Olympiacos
Kallithea	0–1	Doxa Drama

=== Matches ===
21 December 2011
14:00 EET

Anagennisi Epanomi	2–3	Atromitos
Gesios 9'; Georgiou 79'	Report	Karagounis 20', 40'; Brito 78'

Nikos Sarafis Stadium, Thessaloniki
Referee: Georgios Kominis (Thesprotia)

22 December 2011
19:00 EET

Panthrakikos	1–2	Aris
Balú 32'	Report	Soltani 49'; Michel 74'

Komotini Municipal Stadium, Komotini
Referee: Andreas Pappas (Athens)

20 December 2011
14:00 EET

Agrotikos Asteras	0–1	Panathinaikos
	Report	Vyntra 21'

Agrotikos Asteras Ground, Evosmos
Referee: Ioannis Delfakis (Arcadia)

22 December 2011
16:00 EET

Panachaiki	0–1 (a.e.t.)	OFI
	Report	Souza 117'

Kostas Davourlis Stadium, Patras
Referee: Anastasios Kakos (Corfu)

22 December 2011
15:00 EET

Kalamata	0–1	AEK Athens
	Report	Beleck 47'

Kalamata Metropolitan Stadium, Kalamata
Attendance: 4,000
Referee: Georgios Daskalopoulos (Corinthia)

20 December 2011
15:00 EET

Kalloni	2–3 (a.e.t.)	Panionios
Tziortziopoulos 6'; Manousos 41'	Report	Siovas 15'; Schembri 50'; Cocalić 105' (pen.)

Municipal Stadium of Mytilene, Mytilene
Referee: Ioannis Papadopoulos (Macedonia)

21 December 2011
16:00 EET

Ethnikos Asteras	0–3 (Awarded)	PAOK
	Report

Michalis Kritikopoulos Stadium, Kaisariani
Referee: Michael Voskakis (Rethymno)

The match had been suspended in the 15th minute after an assistant referee had been hit by a seat thrown from the stands of Ethnikos Asteras' fans, while the score was at 0–0. With 29 December 2011 decision, the match was awarded to PAOK.

20 December 2011
18:00 EET

Thrasyvoulos	1–1 (a.e.t.)	Levadiakos
Vlachos 68'	Report	Korbos 87'
Penalties
Vasiliou (penalty missed); Psianos (penalty scored); Skondras (penalty scored); Kakaras (penalty scored); Syros (penalty scored)	4–2	(penalty scored) Begoña; (penalty missed) Grbić; (penalty scored) Vasiliou; (penalty missed) Viana

Fyli Stadium, Fyli
Referee: Gerasimos Ditsos (Preveza)

21 December 2011
16:00 EET

Platanias	0–3	Kerkyra
	Report	Giantsis 32'; Barkoglou 36' (pen.), 52'

Municipal Stadium of Maleme, Chania
Referee: Charalambos Kalogeropoulos (Athens)

21 December 2011
15:30 EET

Panserraikos	1–0 (a.e.t.)	Ergotelis
da Costa 109'	Report

Serres Municipal Stadium, Serres
Referee: Stavros Tritsonis (Athens)

20 December 2011
17:00 EET

Pontioi Katerini	0–2	Skoda Xanthi
	Report	Kazakis 40'; Vasilakakis 72'

Athletic Center of Municipality of Katerini, Katerini
Referee: Dimitrios Kalopoulos (Macedonia)

21 December 2011
14:00 EET

Proodeftiki	0–5	Asteras Tripolis
	Report	Solakis 67', 75'; Breška 73'; Rayo 77'; Arsenijević 88' (pen.)

Nikaia Municipal Gymnasium, Nikaia
Referee: Efthalia Mitsi (Piraeus)

21 December 2011
18:00 EET

AEL	0–0 (a.e.t.)	Panetolikos
	Report
Penalties
Zequinha (penalty scored); Saitiotis (penalty scored); Aarab (penalty scored); Chasomeris (penalty scored); Tshibamba (penalty missed); Chatzis (penalty scored); Césinha (penalty scored); Tall (penalty scored); Katsiaros (penalty scored); Arabatzis (penalty scored); Sotiriou (penalty missed)	9–10	(penalty scored) Theodoridis; (penalty scored) Charisteas; (penalty missed) Edjenguélé; (penalty scored) Rocha; (penalty scored) Mitropoulos; (penalty scored) Camara; (penalty scored) Karamalikis; (penalty scored) Kousas; (penalty scored) Paleologos; (penalty scored) Anastasiadis; (penalty scored) Cennamo

AEL FC Arena, Larissa
Referee: Petros Konstantineas (Messinia)

22 December 2011
14:00 EET

Diagoras	0–1	PAS Giannina
	Report	Cuevas 5'

Diagoras Stadium, Rhodes
Referee: Georgios Liachoudis (Macedonia)

21 December 2011
17:00 EET

Pierikos	1–3	Olympiacos
Eleftheriadis 36'	Report	Pantelić 31' (pen.), 45+1'; Abdoun 70'

Athletic Center I of OACA of Municipality of Katerini, Katerini
Referee: Aristomenis Koutsiaftis (Arta)

21 December 2011
16:00 EET

Kallithea	0–1	Doxa Drama
	Report	Arkoudas 83' (o.g.)

Grigoris Lambrakis Stadium, Kallithea
Referee: Christos Mitsios (Epirus)

== Round of 16 ==
The draw for this round took place on 23 December 2011.

=== Summary ===
Team 1	Score	Team 2
Panionios	0–0 (4–3 p)	Panathinaikos
Olympiacos	3–0	Thrasyvoulos
Atromitos	2–1	Aris
Kerkyra	2–0	Doxa Drama
Skoda Xanthi	1–2	Panserraikos
PAOK	2–0	AEK Athens
Panetolikos	1–3	OFI
PAS Giannina	1–4	Asteras Tripolis

=== Matches ===
11 January 2012
21:00 EET

Panionios	0–0 (a.e.t.)	Panathinaikos
	Report
Penalties
Samaris (penalty missed); Cocalić (penalty scored); Schembri (penalty missed); Goundoulakis (penalty scored); Siovas (penalty scored); Omo (penalty scored)	4–3	(penalty missed) Karagounis; (penalty scored) Quincy; (penalty scored) Rudolf; (penalty scored) Katsouranis; (penalty missed) Leto; (penalty missed) Bjärsmyr

Nea Smyrni Stadium, Nea Smyrni
Referee: Anastasios Kakos (Corfu)

11 January 2012
19:00 EET

Olympiacos	3–0	Thrasyvoulos
Pantelić 10', 55'; Fuster 21'	Report

Karaiskakis Stadium, Piraeus
Referee: Georgios Kominis (Thesprotia)

12 January 2012
20:00 EET

Atromitos	2–1	Aris
Fytanidis 79'; Mitroglou 90'	Report	Castillo 46'

Peristeri Stadium, Peristeri
Referee: Anastasios Sidiropoulos (Dodecanese)

11 January 2012
14:00 EET

Kerkyra	2–0	Doxa Drama
Veronesi 24'; Tsigas 28'	Report

Kerkyra Stadium, Corfu
Referee: Stavros Tritsonis (Athens)

17 January 2012
18:00 EET

Skoda Xanthi	1–2	Panserraikos
Marcelinho 25'	Report	da Costa 45', 62'

Skoda Xanthi Arena, Xanthi
Referee: Dimitrios Kyrkos (Epirus)

18 January 2012
20:00 EET

PAOK	2–0	AEK Athens
Lino 33' (pen.); Athanasiadis 54'	Report

Toumba Stadium, Thessaloniki
Attendance: 15,095
Referee: Thanasis Giachos (Chios)

19 January 2012
18:00 EET

Panetolikos	1–3	OFI
Rocha 35'	Report	Šišić 42'; Bourbos 58'; Mantzios 90+7'

Panetolikos Stadium, Agrinio
Referee: Ilias Spathas (Piraeus)

11 January 2012
16:00 EET

PAS Giannina	1–4	Asteras Tripolis
Georgiou 74'	Report	Tsabouris 63'; Rayo 66', 90'; Juli 79'

Zosimades Stadium, Ioannina
Referee: Petros Konstantineas (Messinia)

== Quarter-finals ==
The draw took place on 18 January 2012.

=== Summary ===
Team 1	Score	Team 2
PAOK	1–2 (a.e.t.)	Atromitos
OFI	3–0	Panserraikos
Asteras Tripolis	1–0	Kerkyra
Olympiacos	4–0	Panionios

=== Matches ===
25 January 2012
17:00 EET

PAOK	1–2 (a.e.t.)	Atromitos
Lino 29' (pen.)	Report	Fytanidis 90'; Brito 91'

Toumba Stadium, Thessaloniki
Referee: Georgios Kominis (Thesprotia)

22 February 2012
16:00 EET

OFI	3–0	Panserraikos
Tavlaridis 15'; Papoulis 45+2'; Zorbas 89'	Report

Theodoros Vardinogiannis Stadium, Heraklion
Referee: Giannis Delfakis (Arcadia)

22 February 2012
19:00 EET

Asteras Tripolis	1–0	Kerkyra
Solakis 44'	Report

Asteras Tripolis Stadium, Tripoli
Referee: Giorgos Daskalopoulos (Corinthia)

25 January 2012
20:00 EET

Olympiacos	4–0	Panionios
Pantelić 11', 66'; Diogo 78'; Abdoun 88'	Report

Karaiskakis Stadium, Piraeus
Referee: Alexandros Aretopoulos (Trikala)

== Semi-finals ==
The draw took place on 18 January 2012, after the quarter-final draw.

=== Summary ===
Team 1	Agg.	Team 2	1st leg	2nd leg
Atromitos	(a) 2–2	Asteras Tripolis	0–0	2–2
Olympiacos	1–0	OFI	1–0	0–0

=== Matches ===
21 March 2012
16:30 EET

Atromitos	0–0	Asteras Tripolis
	Report

Peristeri Stadium, Peristeri
Referee: Michael Koukoulakis (Heraklion)
4 April 2012
16:30 EEST

Asteras Tripolis	2–2	Atromitos
Rogério 21' (pen.); Ximo Navarro 46'	Report	Tatos 15'; Mitroglou 72'

Asteras Tripolis Stadium, Tripoli
Referee: Anastasios Kakos (Corfu)

Atromitos won on away goals.

21 March 2012
19:00 EET

Olympiacos	1–0	OFI
Mellberg 81'	Report

Karaiskakis Stadium, Piraeus
Referee: Athanasios Giachos (Chios)
4 April 2012
19:00 EEST

OFI	0–0	Olympiacos
	Report

Theodoros Vardinogiannis Stadium, Heraklion
Referee: Ilias Spathas (Piraeus)

Olympiacos won 1–0 on aggregate.

== Final ==
28 April 2012
20:30 EEST

Atromitos	1–2 (a.e.t.)	Olympiacos
Iglesias 76'	Report	Djebbour 29'; Fuster 119'

Olympic Stadium, Marousi
Attendance: 41,500
Referee: Ilias Spathas (Piraeus)

== Top scorers ==
Rank	Player	Club	Goals
1	(Serbia) Marko Pantelić	Olympiacos	6
2	(Portugal) Filipe da Costa	Panserraikos	3
2	(Spain) Rubén Rayos	Asteras Tripolis	3
2	(Greece) Ilias Solakis	Asteras Tripolis	3
5	(Greece) Nikos Soultanidis	Panthrakikos	2
5	(Greece) Giorgos Barkoglou	Kerkyra	2
5	(Greece) Vangelis Platellas	Kallithea	2
5	(Greece) Kostas Tsoupros	Asteras Magoula	2
5	(Greece) Giannis Gesios	Anagennisi Epanomi	2
5	(Greece) Dimitris Diamantis	Apollon Athens	2
5	(Brazil) Lino	PAOK	2
5	(Greece) Thanasis Karagounis	Atromitos	2
5	(Greece) Kostas Mitroglou	Atromitos	2
5	(Brazil) Brito	Atromitos	2
5	(Greece) Sokratis Fytanidis	Atromitos	2
5	(Algeria) Djamel Abdoun	Olympiacos	2
5	(Spain) David Fuster	Olympiacos	2
