= 2012–13 Greek Football Cup =

2012–13 Greek Cup

Tournament details
- Country: Greece
- Teams: 62

Final positions
- Champions: Olympiacos (26th title)
- Runners-up: Asteras Tripolis

Tournament statistics
- Matches played: 91
- Goals scored: 210 (2.31 per match)
- Top goal scorer(s): Alexandre D'Acol; Stefanos Athanasiadis; Kostas Mitroglou (5 goals each)

The 2012–13 Greek Football Cup was the 71st season of the Greek Football Cup. A total of 62 clubs, five more than the previous edition, were accepted to enter. The competition commenced on 24 October 2012 with the First Round and concluded on 11 May 2013 with the Final, held at Olympic Stadium. The final was contested by Asteras Tripolis and Olympiacos, with Olympiacos winning by 3–1 after extra time.

== Teams ==
Round	Clubs remaining	Clubs involved	Winners from previous round	New entries	Leagues entering
First Round	62	46	none	46	Football League, Football League 2
Second Round	39	14	14	none	none
Round of 32	32	32	9 from First Round & 7 from Second Round	16	Super League
Round of 16	16	16	16	none	none
Quarter-finals	8	8	8	none	none
Semi-finals	4	4	4	none	none
Final	2	2	2	none	none

== Calendar ==
Round	Date(s)	Fixtures	Clubs	New entries
First Round	24 & 25 October 2012	23	62 → 39	46
Second Round	30, 31 October, 1 November 2012	7	39 → 32	none
Round of 32	28, 29 November, 12, 13 & 19, 20, 22, 23 December 2012	16	32 → 16	16
Round of 16	9, 10, 16, 17, 23, 24, 30, 31 January 2013	8	16 → 8	none
Quarter-finals	27, 28 February & 6, 13, 14 March 2013	4	8 → 4	none
Semi-finals	17, 18, 27, 28 April 2013	2	4 → 2	none
Final	11 May 2013	1	2 → 1	none

== Participating clubs ==
The following 62 teams competed in First Round:

2012–13 Super League	2012–13 Football League	2012–13 Football League 2
AEK Athens; Aris; Asteras Tripolis; Atromitos; Kerkyra; Levadiakos; OFI; Olympiacos; Panathinaikos; Panionios; Panthrakikos; PAOK; PAS Giannina; Platanias; Skoda Xanthi; Veria	AEL; AEL Kalloni; Anagennisi Epanomi; Anagennisi Giannitsa; Apollon Smyrnis; Doxa Drama; Ergotelis; Ethnikos Gazoros; Fokikos; Iraklis Psachna; Iraklis; Kallithea; Kavala; Niki Volos; Olympiacos Volos; Panachaiki; Panetolikos; Panserraikos; Pierikos; Thrasyvoulos; Vyzas Megara	Acharnaikos; Aiginiakos; Anagennisi Karditsa; Apollon Kalamarias; Asteras Magoula; Chania; Doxa Kranoula; Episkopi; Ethnikos Asteras; Ethnikos Sidirokastro; Fostiras; Glyfada; Kalamata; Kassiopi; Korinthos; Odysseas Kordelio; Oikonomos Tsaritsani; Panegialios; Paniliakos; Proodeftiki; Rouvas; Tilikratis; Tyrnavos; Vataniakos; Zakynthos

== Knockout phase ==
Each tie in the knockout phase, apart from the first two rounds and the final, was played over two legs, with each team playing one leg at home. The team that scored more goals on aggregate over the two legs advanced to the next round. If the aggregate score was level, the away goals rule was applied, i.e. the team that scored more goals away from home over the two legs advanced. If away goals were also equal, then extra time was played. The away goals rule was again applied after extra time, i.e. if there were goals scored during extra time and the aggregate score was still level, the visiting team advanced by virtue of more away goals scored. If no goals were scored during extra time, the winners were decided by a penalty shoot-out. In the first two rounds and the final, which were played as a single match, if the score was level at the end of normal time, extra time was played, followed by a penalty shoot-out if the score was still level.
The mechanism of the draws for each round is as follows:

- In the draw for the Round of 32, the teams from the first division are seeded and the winners from the previous rounds were unseeded. The seeded teams are drawn against the unseeded teams.
- In the draws for the Round of 16 onwards, there are no seedings and teams from the different group can be drawn against each other.

== First round ==
=== Summary ===
Team 1	Score	Team 2
24 October 2012
Odysseas Kordelio	1–0	Doxa Drama
Kassiopi	2–2 (1–3 p)	Anagennisi Giannitsa
Anagennisi Karditsa	4–1	Iraklis Psachna
Chania	2–1	Fokikos
Kalamata	1–1 (3–4 p)	Thrasyvoulos
Episkopi	0–1	Vyzas
Tilikratis	0–0 (3–5 p)	Kavala
Vataniakos	0–0 (1–4 p)	Niki Volos
Aiginiakos	1–1 (6–5 p)	Ergotelis
Ethnikos Sidirokastro	2–1	Anagennisi Epanomi
Doxa Kranoula	0–0 (1–3 p)	Pierikos
Asteras Magoula	1–2	Olympiacos Volos
Fostiras	4–0	Zakynthos
Proodeftiki	1–0	Iraklis
Ethnikos Asteras	1–1 (1–4 p)	AEL Kalloni
Panegialios	3–1	Panetolikos
Paniliakos	0–0 (3–4 p)	Panachaiki
25 October 2012
Rouvas	1–3	Ethnikos Gazoros
Acharnaikos	0–1	AEL
Tyrnavos	2–0	Oikonomos Tsaritsani
Glyfada	1–2 (a.e.t.)	Panserraikos
Korinthos	1–1 (3–4 p)	Apollon Smyrnis
Apollon Kalamarias	0–1	Kallithea

=== Matches ===
24 October 2012
14:30 EEST

Odysseas Kordelio	1–0	Doxa Drama
Efthimiadis 61'	Report

Kordelio Municipal Stadium, Thessaloniki
Referee: Charalambos Selemidis (Pella)

24 October 2012
14:30 EEST

Kassiopi	2–2 (a.e.t.)	Anagennisi Giannitsa
Petrogiannis 66'; Patiniotis 83'	Report	Fábio 75'; Stefanidis 78'
Penalties
Tsouklis (penalty scored); Gyftokostas (penalty missed); Petrogiannis (penalty missed); Karagiannis (penalty missed)	1–3	(penalty scored) de Paula; (penalty scored) Datidis; (penalty scored) Fábio

Aharavi Stadium, Aharavi
Referee: Alexandros Katsikogiannis (Epirus)

24 October 2012
14:30 EEST

Anagennisi Karditsa	4–1	Iraklis Psachna
Chatzirizos 24', 76'; Bountouris 58'; Yfantis 88'	Report	Jesic 64' (pen.)

Karditsa Municipal Stadium, Karditsa
Referee: Ioannis Blounas (Phthiotis)

24 October 2012
14:30 EEST

Chania	2–1	Fokikos
Goniotakis 11'; Doumanis 50'	Report	Tabakis 23'

Perivolia Municipal Stadium, Chania
Referee: Giorgos Foukakis (Heraklion)

24 October 2012
14:30 EEST

Kalamata	1–1 (a.e.t.)	Thrasyvoulos
Tsimiklis 32'	Report	Vasiliou 11'
Penalties
Tsaggarakis (penalty scored); Andreopoulos (penalty missed); Tsimiklis (penalty scored); Skarlatos (penalty missed); Psychogiopoulos (penalty scored)	3–4	(penalty missed) Bekas; (penalty scored) Serepas; (penalty scored) Syros; (penalty scored) Bakalis; (penalty scored) Tziortziopoulos

Kalamata Municipal Stadium, Kalamata
Referee: Vassilis Panagiotopoulos (Aetoloacarnania)

24 October 2012
14:30 EEST

Episkopi	0–1	Vyzas
	Report	Tabakis 81'

Episkopi Municipal Stadium, Rethymno
Referee: Ioannis Mourtzakis (Heraklion)

24 October 2012
14:30 EEST

Tilikratis	0–0 (a.e.t.)	Kavala
	Report
Penalties
G. Katagis (penalty scored); Sachinidis (penalty missed); Kepetos (penalty scored); Smiltos (penalty scored)	3–5	(penalty scored) Pliagas; (penalty scored) Anastasopoulos; (penalty scored) Nsaliwa; (penalty scored) Bracjani; (penalty scored) Tripotseris

Preveza Municipal Stadium, Preveza
Referee: Konstantinos Balatsoukas (Epirus)

24 October 2012
14:30 EEST

Vataniakos	0–0 (a.e.t.)	Niki Volos
	Report
Penalties
	1–4

Vataniakos Ground, Katerini
Referee: Giorgos Mastakas (Macedonia)

24 October 2012
14:30 EEST

Aiginiakos	1–1 (a.e.t.)	Ergotelis
Platakis 10'	Report	Domatas 81'
Penalties
Apostolidis (penalty scored); Mitrakas (penalty scored); Savvidis (penalty missed); Exarchos (penalty scored); Provatidis (penalty scored); Giaoutzis (penalty scored); Achalinopoulos (penalty scored)	6–5	(penalty scored) Georgiou; (penalty scored) Chanti; (penalty missed) Sarris; (penalty scored) Tzanakakis; (penalty scored) Lambin; (penalty scored) Domatas; (penalty missed) Wellington

Aiginio Municipal Stadium, Aiginio
Referee: Apostolos Simeakis (Chalkidiki)

24 October 2012
14:30 EEST

Ethnikos Sidirokastro	2–1	Anagennisi Epanomi
Gaidartzis 16'; Bouzouras 90'	Report	Nastoski 82'

Sidirokastro Municipal Stadium, Serres
Referee: Evangelos Kiotzenis (Kavala)

24 October 2012
14:30 EEST

Doxa Kranoula	0–0 (a.e.t.)	Pierikos
	Report
Penalties
	1–3

Kranoula Ground, Ioannina
Referee: Nikos Poulimas (Corfu)

24 October 2012
14:30 EEST

Asteras Magoula	1–2	Olympiacos Volos
Stratomitros 44'	Report	Palaiologos 52'; Bakayoko 67'

Eleusis Municipal Stadium, Eleusis
Referee: Iossif Sfakianakis (Athens)

24 October 2012
14:30 EEST

Fostiras	4–0	Zakynthos
Tsonis 12', 42'; Vavatsikos 81'; Dorovinis 90+3'	Report

Tavros Stadium, Tavros
Referee: Alexandros Tsamouris (Piraeus)

24 October 2012
15:00 EEST

Proodeftiki	1–0	Iraklis
Grivas 88'	Report

Proodeftiki Stadium, Nikaia
Referee: Giorgos Chatzis (West Attica)

24 October 2012
15:00 EEST

Ethnikos Asteras	1–1 (a.e.t.)	AEL Kalloni
Theologou 90'	Report	Leozinho 55'
Penalties
Samios (penalty scored); Kampouris (penalty missed); Nikoletos (penalty missed)	1–4	(penalty scored) Marcelo; (penalty scored) Chorianopoulos; (penalty scored) Leozinho; (penalty scored) Manousos

Michalis Kritikopoulos Stadium, Kaisariani
Referee: Christos Andronikidis (Piraeus)

24 October 2012
15:30 EEST

Panegialios	3–1	Panetolikos
Lazanas 43', 90'; Bounas 72'	Report	Kousas 40'

Aigio Municipal Stadium, Aigio
Referee: Giorgos Blanas (Messinia)

24 October 2012
18:00 EEST

Paniliakos	0–0 (a.e.t.)	Panachaiki
	Report
Penalties
Salapatas (penalty missed); Frangos (penalty scored); Vlachopoulos (penalty missed); Petrou (penalty scored); Saramantas (penalty scored); Kolovos (penalty missed)	3–4	(penalty scored) Fatjon; (penalty missed) Hurtado; (penalty scored) Oliseh; (penalty scored) Gourtsas; (penalty missed) Kiliaras; (penalty scored) Karamanlis

Pyrgos Municipal Stadium, Elis
Referee: Nikos Ratsiatos (Argolida)

25 October 2012
14:30 EEST

Rouvas	1–3	Ethnikos Gazoros
Kordonouris 6' (pen.)	Report	Nalbantis 76'; Charitidis 81'; Kosmidis 90'

Gergeri Municipal Stadium, Gergeri
Referee: Ioannis Binichakis (Lasithi)

25 October 2012
14:30 EEST

Acharnaikos	0–1	AEL
	Report	Joël Tshibamba 87'

Acharnes Municipal Stadium, Acharnes
Referee: Nikos Papageorgiou (Athens)

25 October 2012
14:30 EEST

Tyrnavos	2–0	Oikonomos Tsaritsani
Athanasiadis 20'; Bousinakis 70'	Report

Tyrnavos Municipal Stadium, Tyrnavos
Referee: Lambros Papargyriou (Pieria)

25 October 2012
15:30 EEST

Glyfada	1–2 (a.e.t.)	Panserraikos
Moustogiannis 18'	Report	Ranić 16'; Kiassos 98'

Helliniko Stadium, Elliniko
Referee: Ioannis Kampaxis (Euboea)

25 October 2012
16:00 EEST

Korinthos	1–1 (a.e.t.)	Apollon Smyrnis
Da Silva 119'	Report	Diamantis 108'
Penalties
	3–4

Sinikismos Ground, Corinth
Referee: Chrissovalantis Vrakas (Euboea)

25 October 2012
18:15 EEST

Apollon Kalamarias	0–1 (a.e.t.)	Kallithea
	Report	D'Acol 118'

Kalamaria Stadium, Thessaloniki
Referee: Dimitris Karantonis (Imathia)

== Second round ==
The draw for this round took place on 13 October 2012.

=== Summary ===
Team 1	Score	Team 2
30 October 2012
Panserraikos	2–1	Odysseas Kordelio
Anagennisi Giannitsa	0–1	Niki Volos
31 October 2012
Ethnikos Sidirokastro	1–4	Tyrnavos
Thrasyvoulos	1–0	Vyzas
Olympiacos Volos	1–1 (5–3 p)	AEL Kalloni
1 November 2012
Fostiras	0–0 (5–4 p)	Chania
Kavala	2–0	Panegialios
N/A
Ethnikos Gazoros	bye	
AEL	bye	
Proodeftiki	bye	
Apollon Smyrnis	bye	
Anagennisi Karditsa	bye	
Panachaiki	bye	
Aiginiakos	bye	
Pierikos	bye	
Kallithea	bye	

=== Matches ===
30 October 2012
14:00 EET

Panserraikos	2–1	Odysseas Kordelio
Todorov 51'; Gougoulias 88'	Report	Achalinopoulos 1'

Serres Municipal Stadium, Serres
Referee: Fotis Fotiadis (Kastoria)

30 October 2012
14:00 EET

Anagennisi Giannitsa	0–1	Niki Volos
	Report	Tadić 68'

Neos Mylotopos Ground, Neos Mylotopos
Referee: Andreas Karaliolios (Grevena)

31 October 2012
16:00 EET

Ethnikos Sidirokastro	1–4	Tyrnavos
Gaidartzis 69'	Report	Kiptiou 44'; Sidiropoulos 47'; Tsoukalos 57'; Bousinakis 72'

Sidirokastro Municipal Stadium, Serres
Referee: Giorgos Kounalakis (Xanthi)

31 October 2012
16:00 EET

Thrasyvoulos	1–0	Vyzas
Kalamiotis 89'	Report

Fyli Municipal Stadium, Fyli
Referee: Panagiotis Vouranis (Lesbos)

31 October 2012
18:00 EET

Olympiacos Volos	1–1 (a.e.t.)	AEL Kalloni
Gogolos 53'	Report	Leozinho 23'
Penalties
Oyarbide (penalty scored); Añete (penalty scored); Bolatti (penalty scored); Stoyanov (penalty scored); Yenga (penalty scored)	5–3	(penalty scored) Kripintiris; (penalty missed) Marcelo; (penalty scored) Leozinho; (penalty scored) Chorianopoulos

Panthessaliko Stadium, Volos
Referee: Angelos Evangelou (Athens)

1 November 2012
14:00 EET

Fostiras	0–0 (a.e.t.)	Chania
	Report
Penalties
	5–4

Tavros Stadium, Tavros
Referee: Christos Manouras (Trikala)

1 November 2012
18:45 EET

Kavala	2–0	Panegialios
Nsaliwa 6' (pen.); Pliagas 80'	Report

Anthi Karagianni Stadium, Kavala
Referee: Ioannis Topouzis (Thrace)

== Bracket ==
Round of 32
PAS Giannina	1	2	3
Panserraikos	0	0	0
Fostiras (a)	1	1	2
Panionios	0	2	2
Olympiacos (w/o)	2	3	5
Panachaiki	0	0	0
Kavala	0	1	1
AEK Athens	0	0	0
Veria	0	2	2
Thrasyvoulos	0	0	0
Ethnikos Gazoros	1	1	2(4)
Skoda Xanthi (p)	1	1	2(5)
OFI	1	0	1
Apollon Smyrnis (a.e.t.)	0	2	2
Panthrakikos	2	1	3
Niki Volos	0	1	1
Kallithea	3	1	4
Aris	1	2	3
Aiginiakos	1	1	2
PAOK	3	2	5
Levadiakos	2	5	7
Pierikos	0	0	0
Tyrnavos	0	0	0
Kerkyra	2	0	2
Panathinaikos	4	2	6
Proodeftiki	0	1	1
Platanias	3	1	4
Anagennisi Karditsa	1	0	1
Olympiacos Volos (a)	1	2	3
Atromitos	1	2	3
AEL	0	1	1
Asteras Tripolis	0	4	4

Round of 16
PAS Giannina	2	3	5
Fostiras	0	2	2
Olympiacos	2	1	3
Kavala	0	0	0
Veria	2	2	4
Skoda Xanthi	1	0	1
Apollon Smyrnis	1	1	2
Panthrakikos	1	4	5
Kallithea	2	0	2
PAOK	0	6	6
Levadiakos	2	1	3
Kerkyra	1	0	1
Panathinaikos	2	0	2
Platanias (a)	1	1	2
Olympiacos Volos	1	0	1
Asteras Tripolis	1	2	3

Quarter-finals
PAS Giannina	0	0	0
Olympiacos	1	2	3
Veria	0	0	0
Panthrakikos	1	1	2
PAOK	2	0	2
Levadiakos	0	0	0
Platanias	1	1	2
Asteras Tripolis	2	3	5

Semi-finals
Olympiacos	6	2	8
Panthrakikos	2	1	3
PAOK	2	0	2
Asteras Tripolis	1	2	3

Final
Olympiacos (a.e.t.)	3
Asteras Tripolis	1

== Round of 32 ==
The draw for this round took place on 13 October 2012.

=== Summary ===
Team 1	Agg.	Team 2	1st leg	2nd leg
Panthrakikos	3–1	Niki Volos	2–0	1–1
Kavala	1–0	AEK Athens	0–0	1–0
Ethnikos Gazoros	2–2 (4–5 p)	Skoda Xanthi	1–1	1–1 (a.e.t.)
Fostiras	(a) 2–2	Panionios	1–0	1–2
Veria	2–0	Thrasyvoulos	0–0	2–0
Tyrnavos	0–2	Kerkyra	0–2	0–0
PAS Giannina	3–0	Panserraikos	1–0	2–0
Olympiacos	5–0	Panachaiki	2–0	3–0 (w/o)
Levadiakos	7–0	Pierikos	2–0	5–0
Aiginiakos	2–5	PAOK	1–3	1–2
Olympiacos Volos	(a) 3–3	Atromitos	1–1	2–2
OFI	1–2	Apollon Smyrnis	1–0	0–2 (a.e.t.)
Kallithea	4–3	Aris	3–1	1–2
Platanias	4–1	Anagennisi Karditsa	3–1	1–0
AEL	1–4	Asteras Tripolis	0–0	1–4
Panathinaikos	6–1	Proodeftiki	4–0	2–1

=== Matches ===
29 November 2012
18:30 EET

Panthrakikos	2–0	Niki Volos
Baykara 8'; Kyvelidis 53'	Report

Komotini Municipal Stadium, Komotini
Referee: Apostolos Abarkiolis (Macedonia)
19 December 2012
17:00 EET

Niki Volos	1–1	Panthrakikos
Kyriakos 60'	Report	Vahirua 57'

Panthessaliko Stadium, Volos
Referee: Aristomenis Koutsiaftis (Arta)

Panthrakikos won 3–1 on aggregate.

13 December 2012
18:30 EET

Kavala	0–0	AEK Athens
	Report

Anthi Karagianni Stadium, Kavala
Referee: Stefanos Mantakis (Imathia)
20 December 2012
20:00 EET

AEK Athens	0–1	Kavala
	Report	Nsaliwa 53'

Olympic Stadium, Marousi
Attendance: 300
Referee: Michalis Voskakis (Rethymno)

Kavala won 1–0 on aggregate.

13 December 2012
20:30 EET

Ethnikos Gazoros	1–1	Skoda Xanthi
Aleksandrowicz 48'	Report	Markovski 70'

Serres Municipal Stadium, Serres
Referee: Giannis Papadopoulos (Macedonia)
23 December 2012
17:00 EET

Skoda Xanthi	1–1 (a.e.t.)	Ethnikos Gazoros
Onwuachi 61'	Report	Goutas 23' (o.g.)
Penalties
Mantalos (penalty scored); Marcelinho (penalty scored); Baxevanidis (penalty scored); Vasilakakis (penalty scored); Nakas (penalty missed); Dani (penalty missed); Vallas (penalty scored)	5–4	(penalty scored) Konstantinidis; (penalty scored) Gogas; (penalty scored) Kapias; (penalty scored) Aleksandrowicz; (penalty missed) Nalbantis; (penalty missed) Savvidis; (penalty missed) Georgiadis

Skoda Xanthi Arena, Xanthi
Referee: Giorgos Kyzas (Drama)

Skoda Xanthi won 5–4 on penalties.

28 November 2012
14:30 EET

Fostiras	1–0	Panionios
Kampas 34'	Report

Tavros Stadium, Tavros
Referee: Anastasios Papapetrou (Athens)
19 December 2012
20:00 EET

Panionios	2–1	Fostiras
Dounis 10', 22'	Report	Kampas

Nea Smyrni Stadium, Nea Smyrni
Referee: Georgios Giannoulakis (Chania)

Fostiras won on away goals.

12 December 2012
18:30 EET

Veria	0–0	Thrasyvoulos
	Report

Veria Stadium, Veria
Referee: Gerasimos Ditsos (Preveza)
20 December 2012
17:00 EET

Thrasyvoulos	0–2	Veria
	Report	Guille 35'; Costly 84'

Fyli Municipal Stadium, Fyli
Referee: Mitsios Christos (Epirus)

Veria won 2–0 on aggregate.

29 November 2012
14:30 EET

Tyrnavos	0–2	Kerkyra
	Report	Diamantopoulos 26' (pen.); Simosis 79'

Tyrnavos Municipal Stadium, Tyrnavos
Referee: Alexandros Dimitropoulos (Phthiotis)
20 December 2012
17:00 EET

Kerkyra	0–0	Tyrnavos
	Report

Kerkyra Stadium, Corfu
Referee: Nikolaos Roussos-Bekertzis (Preveza)

Kerkyra won 2–0 on aggregate.

29 November 2012
20:30 EET

PAS Giannina	1–0	Panserraikos
Giakos 22'	Report

Zosimades Stadium, Ioannina
Referee: Marios Lambropoulos (Elis)
23 December 2012
20:00 EET

Panserraikos	0–2	PAS Giannina
	Report	Niklitsiotis 35'; Ilić 57'

Serres Municipal Stadium, Serres
Referee: Apostolos Abarkiolis (Macedonia)

PAS Giannina won 3–0 on aggregate.

28 November 2012
20:30 EET

Olympiacos	2–0	Panachaiki
Djebbour 47'; Mitroglou 71'	Report

Karaiskakis Stadium, Piraeus
Referee: Dimitris Thanos (Grevena)
19 December 2012
20:00 EET

Panachaiki	0–3 (Awarded)	Olympiacos
Gourtsas 4'	Report	Fetfatzidis 57'

Kostas Davourlis Stadium, Patras
Referee: Alexandros Dimitropoulos (Phthiotis)

Match suspended at 87th minute while the score was 1–1.

Olympiacos won 5–0 on aggregate.

28 November 2012
18:30 EET

Levadiakos	2–0	Pierikos
Poy 34'; Rogério 88'	Report

Levadia Municipal Stadium, Levadia
Referee: Stavros Mantalos (Athens)
20 December 2012
20:00 EET

Pierikos	0–5	Levadiakos
	Report	Vasiliou 3', 32', 51'; Dimou 59' (o.g.); Lisgaras 88'

Katerini Municipal Stadium, Katerini
Referee: Evangelos Kiotzenis (Kavala)

Levadiakos won 7–0 on aggregate.

13 December 2012
20:30 EET

Aiginiakos	1–3	PAOK
Exarchos 18'	Report	Giannou 11'; Salpingidis 28'; Fotakis 62'

Katerini Municipal Stadium, Katerini
Referee: Giannis Topouzis (Thrace)
22 December 2012
20:00 EET

PAOK	2–1	Aiginiakos
Giannou 36'; Stafylidis 65'	Report	Giakoumis 77' (o.g.)

Toumba Stadium, Thessaloniki
Attendance: 2,223
Referee: Christos Granas (Xanthi)

PAOK won 5–2 on aggregate.

12 December 2012
20:30 EET

Olympiacos Volos	1–1	Atromitos
Gotovos 24'	Report	Karamanos 77'

Panthessaliko Stadium, Volos
Referee: Giorgos Liachoudis (Macedonia)
22 December 2012
20:00 EET

Atromitos	2–2	Olympiacos Volos
Epstein 1'; Lazaridis 73'	Report	Pindonis 49'; Añete 90'

Peristeri Stadium, Peristeri
Referee: Anastasios Sidiropoulos (Dodecanese)

Olympiacos Volos won on away goals.

28 November 2012
18:30 EET

OFI	1–0	Apollon Smyrnis
Papazoglou 60' (pen.)	Report

Theodoros Vardinogiannis Stadium, Heraklion
Referee: Giorgos Kyzas (Drama)
22 December 2012
17:00 EET

Apollon Smyrnis	2–0 (a.e.t.)	OFI
Manias 2', 108'	Report

Georgios Kamaras Stadium, Rizoupoli
Referee: Athanasios Giachos (Chios)

Apollon Smyrnis won 2–1 on aggregate.

12 December 2012
18:30 EET

Kallithea	3–1	Aris
D'Acol 18', 57'; Da Silva 76'	Report	Gianniotas 79'

Grigoris Lambrakis Stadium, Kallithea
Referee: Spiros Selimos (Laconia)
23 December 2012
20:00 EET

Aris	2–1	Kallithea
Sounas 29'; Pulido 82'	Report	D'Acol 57'

Kleanthis Vikelidis Stadium, Thessaloniki
Referee: Gerasimos Ditsos (Preveza)

Kallithea won 4–3 on aggregate.

13 December 2012
16:30 EET

Platanias	3–1	Anagennisi Karditsa
Arocha 6', 34'; Maragoudakis 54'	Report	Athanasiadis 12'

Perivolia Municipal Stadium, Chania
Referee: Angelos Evangelou (Athens)
23 December 2012
17:00 EET

Anagennisi Karditsa	0–1	Platanias
	Report	Anastasakos 36' (pen.)

Karditsa Municipal Stadium, Karditsa
Referee: Ioannis Kampaxis (Euboea)

Platanias won 4–1 on aggregate.

12 December 2012
20:30 EET

AEL	0–0	Asteras Tripolis
	Report

AEL FC Arena, Larissa
Referee: Marios Lambropoulos (Elis)
22 December 2012
17:00 EET

Asteras Tripolis	4–1	AEL
Navarro 13'; Papageorgiou 45' (o.g.); Rayos 50'; Kalantzis 75'	Report	Francou 85'

Asteras Tripolis Stadium, Tripoli
Referee: Charalampos Kalogeropoulos (Athens)

Asteras Tripolis won 4–1 on aggregate.

29 November 2012
18:30 EET

Panathinaikos	4–0	Proodeftiki
Fornaroli 44', 62'; Christodoulopoulos 45+1'; Sow 83'	Report

Olympic Stadium, Marousi
Referee: Christos Mitsios (Epirus)
19 December 2012
14:00 EET

Proodeftiki	1–2	Panathinaikos
Panagiotopoulos 7'	Report	Petropoulos 59'; Mavrias 83'

Proodeftiki Stadium, Nikaia
Referee: Georgios Chatzis (West Attica)

Panathinaikos won 6–1 on aggregate.

== Round of 16 ==
The draw for this round took place on 13 October 2012, after the Round of 32 draw.

=== Summary ===
Team 1	Agg.	Team 2	1st leg	2nd leg
Kallithea	2–6	PAOK	2–0	0–6
Levadiakos	3–1	Kerkyra	2–1	1–0
Olympiacos	3–0	Kavala	2–0	1–0
Panathinaikos	2–2 (a)	Platanias	2–1	0–1
Veria	4–1	Skoda Xanthi	2–1	2–0
Apollon Smyrnis	2–5	Panthrakikos	1–1	1–4
PAS Giannina	5–2	Fostiras	2–0	3–2
Olympiacos Volos	1–3	Asteras Tripolis	1–1	0–2

=== Matches ===
10 January 2013
20:00 EET

Kallithea	2–0	PAOK
D'Acol 79' (pen.); Maroukakis 83'	Report

Grigoris Lambrakis Stadium, Kallithea
Attendance: 1,150
Referee: Marios Lambropoulos (Elis)
24 January 2013
20:00 EET

PAOK	6–0	Kallithea
Athanasiadis 6', 41', 56'; Lazăr 12'; Lawrence 39' (pen.); Katsouranis 42'	Report

Toumba Stadium, Thessaloniki
Attendance: 10,035
Referee: Christos Mitsios (Epirus)

PAOK won 6–2 on aggregate.

17 January 2013
17:00 EET

Levadiakos	2–1	Kerkyra
Vasiliou 10'; Romeu 88'	Report	Simosis 30'

Levadia Municipal Stadium, Levadia
Referee: Giorgos Foukakis (Heraklion)
31 January 2013
14:00 EET

Kerkyra	0–1	Levadiakos
	Report	Rogério 32'

Kerkyra Stadium, Corfu
Referee: Giannis Topouzis (Thrace)

Levadiakos won 3–1 on aggregate.

16 January 2013
20:00 EET

Olympiacos	2–0	Kavala
Papazoglou 60'; Fejsa 82'	Report

Karaiskakis Stadium, Piraeus
Referee: Anastasios Papapetrou (Athens)
30 January 2013
20:00 EET

Kavala	0–1	Olympiacos
	Report	Siovas 12'

Anthi Karagianni Stadium, Kavala
Referee: Antonis Foukakis (Heraklion)

Olympiacos won 3–0 on aggregate.

9 January 2013
20:00 EET

Panathinaikos	2–1	Platanias
Sow 16'; Toché 65'	Report	Nazlidis 82' (pen.)

Athens Olympic Stadium, Marousi
Referee: Georgios Daskalopoulos (Corinthia)
23 January 2013
17:00 EET

Platanias	1–0	Panathinaikos
Anastasakos 87'	Report

Perivolia Municipal Stadium, Chania
Referee: Stavros Mantalos (Athens)

Platanias won on away goals.

17 January 2013
20:00 EET

Veria	2–1	Skoda Xanthi
Costly 5', 52'	Report	Mantalos 67' (pen.)

Veria Stadium, Veria
Referee: Aristomenis Koutsiaftis (Arta)
30 January 2013
17:00 EET

Skoda Xanthi	0–2	Veria
	Report	Kalogeris 37'; Olaitan 78'

Skoda Xanthi Arena, Xanthi
Referee: Anastasios Papapetrou (Athens)

Veria won 4–1 on aggregate.

16 January 2013
17:00 EET

Apollon Smyrnis	1–1	Panthrakikos
Tsiliggiris 77'	Report	Kontogoulidis 90'

Georgios Kamaras Stadium, Rizoupoli
Referee: Gerasimos Ditsos (Preveza)
31 January 2013
20:00 EET

Panthrakikos	4–1	Apollon Smyrnis
Tzanis 5'; Cherfa 35'; Vahirua 79'; Lucero 86'	Report	Katsikis 65' (pen.)

Komotini Municipal Stadium, Komotini
Referee: Giannis Papadopoulos (Macedonia)

Panthrakikos won 5–2 on aggregate.

10 January 2013
17:00 EET

PAS Giannina	2–0	Fostiras
Tsoukalas 41'; De Vincenti 48'	Report

Zosimades Stadium, Ioannina
Referee: Ioannis Delfakis (Arcadia)
24 January 2013
17:00 EET

Fostiras	2–3	PAS Giannina
Boubas 4'; Vlachos 89'	Report	Giakos 8'; Lila 34'; Vila 50'

Tavros Stadium, Tavros
Referee: Giannis Papadopoulos (Macedonia)

PAS Giannina won 5–2 on aggregate.

9 January 2013
17:00 EET

Olympiacos Volos	1–1	Asteras Tripolis
Yenga 15' (pen.)	Report	Kalantzis 70'

Panthessaliko Stadium, Volos
Referee: Stefanos Mantakis (Imathia)
23 January 2013
20:00 EET

Asteras Tripolis	2–0	Olympiacos Volos
De Blasis 62'; Formica 76'	Report

Asteras Tripolis Stadium, Tripoli
Referee: Alexandros Aretopoulos (Trikala)

Asteras Tripolis won 3–1 on aggregate.

== Quarter-finals ==
The draw for this round took place on 4 February 2013.

=== Summary ===
Team 1	Agg.	Team 2	1st leg	2nd leg
PAS Giannina	0–3	Olympiacos	0–1	0–2
Platanias	2–5	Asteras Tripolis	1–2	1–3
PAOK	2–0	Levadiakos	2–0	0–0
Veria	0–2	Panthrakikos	0–1	0–1

=== Matches ===
27 February 2013
20:00 EET

PAS Giannina	0–1	Olympiacos
	Report	Abdoun 54'

Zosimades Stadium, Ioannina
Referee: Giannis Topouzis (Thrace)
13 March 2013
18:00 EET

Olympiacos	2–0	PAS Giannina
Maniatis 63'; Abdoun 90+3'	Report

Karaiskakis Stadium, Piraeus
Referee: Konsantinos Ioannidis (Argolida)

Olympiacos won 3–0 on aggregate.

27 February 2013
16:00 EET

Platanias	1–2	Asteras Tripolis
Mirčeta 16'	Report	Bartolini 31'; Navarro 89'

Perivolia Municipal Stadium, Chania
Referee: Giorgos Kominis (Thesprotia)
14 March 2013
15:00 EET

Asteras Tripolis	3–1	Platanias
Usero 38'; De Blasis 65'; Kalantzis 88'	Report	Mirčeta 41'

Asteras Tripolis Stadium, Tripoli
Referee: Stefanos Mantakis (Imathia)

Asteras Tripolis won 5–2 on aggregate.

28 February 2013
18:00 EET

PAOK	2–0	Levadiakos
Athanasiadis 58'; Salpingidis 61'	Report

Toumba Stadium, Thessaloniki
Attendance: 11,548
Referee: Athanasios Giachos (Chios)
6 March 2013
18:00 EET

Levadiakos	0–0	PAOK
	Report

Levadia Municipal Stadium, Levadia
Referee: Stavros Mantalos (Athens)

PAOK won 2–0 on aggregate.

27 February 2013
18:00 EET

Veria	0–1	Panthrakikos
	Report	Mingas 23'

Veria Stadium, Veria
Referee: Anastasios Papapetrou (Athens)
13 March 2013
15:00 EET

Panthrakikos	1–0	Veria
Sarakatsanos 39'	Report

Komotini Municipal Stadium, Komotini
Referee: Christos Mitsios (Epirus)

Panthrakikos won 2–0 on aggregate.

== Semi-finals ==
The draw for this round took place on 4 February 2013, after the quarter-final draw.

=== Summary ===
Team 1	Agg.	Team 2	1st leg	2nd leg
PAOK	2–3	Asteras Tripolis	2–1	0–2
Olympiacos	8–3	Panthrakikos	6–2	2–1

=== Matches ===
17 April 2013
20:00 EEST

PAOK	2–1	Asteras Tripolis
Athanasiadis 23'; Salpingidis 89'	Report	Navarro 64'

Toumba Stadium, Thessaloniki
Attendance: 26,901
Referee: Stavros Mantalos (Athens)
27 April 2013
20:00 EEST

Asteras Tripolis	2–0	PAOK
Usero 61', 86'	Report

Asteras Tripolis Stadium, Tripoli
Referee: Ilias Spathas (Piraeus)

Asteras Tripolis won 3–2 on aggregate.

18 April 2013
20:00 EEST

Olympiacos	6–2	Panthrakikos
Melissis 4' (o.g.); Ibagaza 11'; Mitroglou 48', 53'; Fetfatzidis 51'; Fuster 55'	Report	Tzanis 19'; Lucero 32'

Karaiskakis Stadium, Piraeus
Referee: Charalambos Kalogeropoulos (Athens)
28 April 2013
20:00 EEST

Panthrakikos	1–2	Olympiacos
Papadopoulos 83' (pen.)	Report	Mitroglou 27', 40'

Komotini Municipal Stadium, Komotini
Referee: Alexandros Aretopoulos (Trikala)

Olympiacos won 8–3 on aggregate.

== Final ==
11 May 2013
20:30 EEST

Asteras Tripolis	1–3 (a.e.t.)	Olympiacos
Rayo 14'	Report	Fuster 42'; Djebbour 98'; Abdoun 119' (pen.)

Olympic Stadium, Marousi
Attendance: 28,980
Referee: Athanasios Giachos (Chios)

== Top scorers ==
Rank	Player	Club	Goals
1	(Brazil) Alexandre D'Acol	Kallithea	5
1	(Greece) Stefanos Athanasiadis	PAOK	5
1	(Greece) Kostas Mitroglou	Olympiacos	5
4	(Greece) Christos Kalantzis	Asteras Tripolis	4
4	(Greece) Stelios Vasiliou	Levadiakos	4
6	(Algeria) Djamel Abdoun	Olympiacos	3
6	(Spain) Fernando Usero	Asteras Tripolis	3
6	(Spain) David Fuster	Olympiacos	3
6	(Greece) Dimitris Salpingidis	PAOK	3
6	(Spain) Ximo Navarro	Asteras Tripolis	3
