= Vouzas =

Vouzas is a Greek surname. Notable people with the surname include:

- Antonis Vouzas (born 1993), Greek footballer
- Argyrios Vouzas (c. 1857–?), Greek revolutionary
- Vasilios Vouzas (born 1966), Greek footballer and manager
