= Christos Kalantzis =

Greek footballer (born 1982)

Personal information
- Date of birth: 1 December 1982 (age 43)
- Place of birth: Kalamata, Greece
- Height: 1.80 m (5 ft 11 in)
- Position: Centre forward

Senior career*
Years	Team	Apps	(Gls)
1999–2005	Kalamata	127	(26)
2005–2008	AEL	66	(6)
2008–2010	Atromitos	51	(9)
2010–2012	Kerkyra	55	(7)
2012–2013	Asteras Tripolis	23	(2)
2013–2017	Kalamata	48	(18)
Total		348	(60)
- * Club domestic league appearances and goals as of 10 February 2016, 21:00 (UTC)

Christos Kalantzis (Greek: Χρήστος Καλαντζής; born 1 December 1982) is a Greek retired professional footballer who played as a striker.

== Honours ==
AEL

- Greek Cup: 2006–07

Asteras Tripolis

- Greek Cup runner-up: 2012–13
