= Kliment Nastoski =

Macedonian footballer (born 1987)

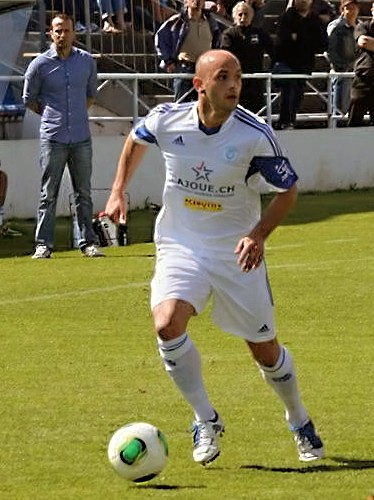

Personal information
- Date of birth: 20 April 1987 (age 39)
- Place of birth: Ohrid, SFR Yugoslavia
- Height: 1.85 m (6 ft 1 in)
- Position: Attacking midfielder

Team information
- Current team: Grenchen
- Number: 4

Youth career
- 1993–2001: FK Ohrid
- 2002–2006: Partizan Belgrade

Senior career*
Years	Team	Apps	(Gls)
2006–2007	Dinamo Vranje	17	(1)
2007–2009	Pobeda	39	(1)
2009	Olimpik Sarajevo	5	(0)
2010	Krško	13	(0)
2011	Metalurg Skopje	8	(1)
2011	Pogradeci	10	(1)
2012	Shkumbini	4	(0)
2012–2013	Anagennisi Epanomi	12	(0)
2013–2014	Grenchen	24	(0)
2014–2015	Old Boys	7	(0)
2015–2017	FC Solothurn		
2017–	Grenchen		
Total		139	(4)
- * Club domestic league appearances and goals as of 7 September 2014

Kliment Nastoski (Macedonian: Kлимент Настоски, born 20 April 1987) is a footballer from Macedonia. He is a versatile player capable of playing both as a defensive and attacking central midfielder. He plays for Grenchen in the Swiss Solothurner Kantonal-Fussballverband.

== Club career ==
Nastoski was born in Ohrid. After playing in the youth teams of FK Partizan, he begin his senior career playing with another Serbian club FK Dinamo Vranje. In 2007, he returned to Macedonia and signed with Macedonian First League club FK Pobeda where he stayed two seasons. In summer 2009 he moved to FK Olimpik Sarajevo playing in the Premier League of Bosnia and Herzegovina, but next winter he moved to Slovenia, to NK Krško. Since January 2011 he will play with FK Metalurg Skopje in the Macedonian First League. In summer 2011 he moved to Albania, where he represented two clubs during the 2011–12 Albanian Superliga season, KS Pogradeci and Shkumbini Peqin. In summer 2012 he moved to Greece and joined Football League side Anagennisi Epanomi F.C. He play now in 3 Swiss league for Old Boys.

== International career ==
Nastoski regularly represented the youth teams of Macedonia, but has not made a senior team debut.

== Honours ==
Metalurg Skopje

- Macedonian Cup: 2011
