= Fabricio Poci =

Argentine footballer

Personal information
- Full name: Fabricio Leonel Poci
- Date of birth: April 10, 1986 (age 40)
- Place of birth: Buenos Aires, Argentina
- Height: 1.82 m (5 ft 11 1/2 in)
- Position: Defensive midfielder

Senior career*
Years	Team	Apps	(Gls)
2008–2009	Asteras Rethimno	21	(1)
2009–2011	Platanias	46	(1)
2012–2013	AEL	15	(0)
2013–2014	Chania	28	(0)
2014–2015	Ayia Napa	6	(0)
2015	Panargiakos	0	(0)
2015–2016	Kissamikos	20	(0)
2016–2017	Olympiacos Volos	17	(0)
2017–2018	Rodos	18	(0)
2018–2019	Ierapetra	22	(0)
2019–2020	Paleochora	22	(0)
2020–2021	Almyros		
2021	Iraklis Larissa	0	(0)
- * Club domestic league appearances and goals as of 1 January 2021

Fabricio Leonel Poci (born 10 April 1986 in Buenos Aires), is an Argentinian former footballer who last played as a midfielder for Iraklis Larissa. He came in Greece in 2008 and played for 3rd division team Asteras Rethimno. A year later he joined another Cretan football team, Platanias, where he managed to play 2.5 years. On 22 December 2011, he signed a 1.5 years contract with Greek Football League club AEL, but managed to play only 15 games for 1,5 season because of a serious injury (rupture of the medial cruciate ligament) that kept him off pitch for almost 4 months. In June 2013, he returned to Crete, this time for Chania, who had just been promoted to the second division.
