= Jorge Pina (footballer) =

Spanish footballer

Personal information
- Full name: Jorge Pina Roldán
- Date of birth: 28 February 1983 (age 43)
- Place of birth: Zaragoza, Spain
- Height: 1.74 m (5 ft 9 in)
- Position: Winger

Youth career
- Zaragoza

Senior career*
Years	Team	Apps	(Gls)
2001–2004	Zaragoza B	76	(2)
2004–2005	Racing Ferrol	32	(1)
2005–2006	Málaga B	29	(3)
2005	Málaga	2	(0)
2006–2007	Salamanca	34	(1)
2007–2008	Sporting Gijón	15	(0)
2008–2010	Levante	51	(5)
2010–2011	Albacete	10	(0)
2011	Andorra	10	(0)
2012	AEL	9	(0)
2013	Villanovense	11	(0)
2013–2014	Birkebeineren	12	(2)
2014	Sariñena	10	(0)
2015	Ebro		
2015–2016	Arroyo	34	(2)
2016–2017	Loja	34	(2)
2017–2018	Europa	21	(0)
2018–2020	El Palo	56	(2)
Total		446	(20)

International career
2000	Spain U16	4	(2)
2001	Spain U17	4	(2)
2001–2002	Spain U19	10	(0)
2003	Spain U20	7	(1)
2004	Spain U21	1	(0)
- * Club domestic league appearances and goals

Jorge Pina Roldán (born 28 February 1983 in Zaragoza, Aragon) is a Spanish former professional footballer who played as a left winger.

== Honours ==
Spain U19

- UEFA European Under-19 Championship: 2002

Spain U20

- FIFA U-20 World Cup runner-up: 2003
