= Matías Iglesias =

Argentine footballer

Personal information
- Full name: Matías Walter Iglesias
- Date of birth: 18 April 1985 (age 41)
- Place of birth: Mendoza, Argentina
- Height: 1.90 m (6 ft 3 in)
- Position: Defensive midfielder

Youth career
- 2002–2003: Andes Talleres Sport Club
- 2004–2007: Atlético Madrid

Senior career*
Years	Team	Apps	(Gls)
2005–2007	Atlético Madrid B	12	(0)
2005–2006	→ Toledo (loan)	5	(0)
2007–2011	AEL	80	(2)
2011–2014	Atromitos	62	(10)
2014–2015	Changchun Yatai	15	(2)
2015–2023	Asteras Tripolis	188	(14)
2023–2024	Ionikos	4	(0)
Total		366	(18)
- * Club domestic league appearances and goals as of 3 December 2023

Matías Walter Iglesias (Spanish pronunciation: [maˈti.as ˈwalteɾ iˈɣlesjas]; born 18 April 1985) is an Argentine professional footballer who last played as a defensive midfielder for Greek Super League 2 club Ionikos.

== Career ==
Born in Mendoza (Argentina), Iglesias started his football career in Argentina with Andes Talleres Sport Club. Iglesias was transferred to Atlético Madrid being a part of the U21 team. He played three years in Spain. In August 2007, AEL signs Iglesias by buying 50% of his playing rights from Atlético Madrid. In January 2012, he signed with Athens club Atromitos as a free agent, where he would meet again his former AEL coach, Georgios Donis. During the 2 1/2 seasons he managed to play 73 games (11 goals, 3 assists) both in local competitions and UEFA Europa League.

On 25 February 2014, after a good season at Atromitos, Iglesias was signed for Changchun Yatai, who had beaten AEK and Spanish club Levante by higher price (€450,000). His contract will be for one (plus one) year. On 8 March 2014, he made his debut for Yatai in a 1–0 away defeat against Beijing Guoan. On 23 April 2014, he scored his first goal for the club in a 3–1 away win against defending champions Guangzhou Evergrande. He made only 15 appearances for Yatai in the 2014 season due to injuries and scored 2 goals.

On 19 January 2015, Iglesias signed a one-and-a-half-year contract with Super League Greece club Asteras Tripolis for an undisclosed fee.

On 24 June 2018, the experienced Argentine midfielder extended his contract until the summer of 2020.

On 3 March 2019, Iglesias scored his first goal for the 2018–19 season in a home game against Panetolikos, which ended as a 3–0 win. On 5 May 2019, in the last matchday of the season, he scored in a 3–0 home win against Panionios, which secured his team's spot in the top division.

On 20 July 2020, Iglesias signed a new contract, running until the summer of 2021.

== Career statistics ==
=== Club ===
Appearances and goals by club, season and competition
Club	Season	League			Cup		Continental		Other		Total	
Club	Season	Division	Apps	Goals	Apps	Goals	Apps	Goals	Apps	Goals	Apps	Goals
AEL	2007–08	Super League Greece	15	0	3	0	—		1	0	19	0
AEL	2008–09	Super League Greece	27	1	2	0	—		—		29	1
AEL	2009–10	Super League Greece	18	0	1	0	1	0	—		20	0
AEL	2010–11	Super League Greece	20	1	2	0	—		—		22	1
AEL	Total		80	2	8	0	1	0	1	0	90	2
Atromitos	2011–12	Super League Greece	13	1	2	1	—		—		15	1
Atromitos	2012–13	Super League Greece	30	3	2	0	2	0	—		34	3
Atromitos	2013–14	Super League Greece	19	6	4	1	1	0	—		24	7
Atromitos	Total		62	10	8	1	3	0	—		73	11
Changchun Yatai	2014	Chinese Super League	15	2	0	0	—		—		15	2
Asteras Tripolis	2014–15	Super League Greece	18	2	0	0	—		—		18	2
Asteras Tripolis	2015–16	Super League Greece	21	3	2	1	6	0	—		29	4
Asteras Tripolis	2016–17	Super League Greece	19	0	5	1	—		—		24	1
Asteras Tripolis	2017–18	Super League Greece	25	4	4	0	—		—		29	4
Asteras Tripolis	2018–19	Super League Greece	20	2	3	0	2	0	—		25	2
Asteras Tripolis	2019–20	Super League Greece	17	2	4	2	—		—		21	4
Asteras Tripolis	2020–21	Super League Greece	24	0	1	0	—		—		25	0
Asteras Tripolis	2021–22	Super League Greece	23	1	1	0	—		—		24	1
Asteras Tripolis	2022–23	Super League Greece	21	0	0	0	—		—		21	0
Asteras Tripolis	Total		188	14	20	4	8	0	—		216	18
Ionikos	2023–24	Super League Greece 2	4	0	0	0	—		—		4	0
Career total			349	28	36	6	12	0	1	0	398	34

== Honours ==
Atromitos

- Greek Cup runner-up: 2011–12
