= Yannick Yenga =

Congolese footballer (born 1985)

Personal information
- Full name: Yannick Yenga Risasi
- Date of birth: 10 April 1985 (age 41)
- Place of birth: Kinshasa, Zaire
- Height: 1.81 m (5 ft 11 1/2 in)
- Position: Striker

Team information
- Current team: AS Le Mans Villaret

Senior career*
Years	Team	Apps	(Gls)
2001–2005	Le Mans Union Club 72	1	(0)
2005–2006	SO Châtellerault	36	(11)
2006–2008	Dijon FCO	44	(8)
2008–2009	Paris FC	35	(11)
2009–2011	FC Tours	28	(2)
2011	RC Strasbourg	17	(2)
2011–2012	Paris FC	12	(5)
2012–2014	Olympiacos Volos	40	(6)
2014–2015	Lamia	19	(3)
2015–2016	Ermis Aradippou	19	(1)
2017–	Le Mans Villaret		

International career
2007	Congo DR	3	(0)

Managerial career
- 2020–: Le Mans Villaret (player-coach)
- * Club domestic league appearances and goals as of 21:11, 5 January 2024 (UTC)

Yannick Yenga Risasi (born 10 April 1985) is a Congolese footballer who plays as a striker for French side Le Mans Villaret.

== Career ==
Yenga started his career with Le Mans Union Club 72 but made only two first-team appearances for the club before joining SO Châtellerault in 2005. After scoring 11 goals in the Championnat National, he was signed by Ligue 2 side Dijon FCO. Yenga spent two seasons with Dijon but failed to properly break into the first team, making just 15 league starts for the club. He subsequently returned to the National with Paris FC and scored 11 times during the 2008–09 season. This led to a move back to Ligue 2 when he signed for FC Tours on 16 June 2009.

However, Yenga again failed to make an impact at the higher level, scoring only two goals in 28 league appearances. In the transfer window of January 2011, he transferred to RC Strasbourg until the end of the 2010–11 season. He left the club in the summer of the same year following their demotion by the DNCG to the Championnat de France amateur 2, the fifth tier of French football. Yenga then returned to Paris FC for the start of the 2011–12 campaign, and scored the first hat-trick of his senior career in the side's 6–0 win against SAS Épinal on 12 October 2011.

In summer 2012 he moved to Olympiacos Volos He scored his first goal against Kavala in a 2–0 home win. His next goal came against Anagennisi Epanomi F.C. in a 2–0 home win. He also scored against Apollon Smyrnis in a 3–0 home win. Later, he managed to score against Iraklis in a 1–0 away win with a powerful shot. His last goal for the 2012–13 season came against Panetolikos in a 1–2 home loss.

He started the 2013–14 season by scoring against Glyfada F.C. in a 4–1 home win. His next goal came against Paniliakos with a header after an assist from Sergio Daniel Ponce.

== Managerial career ==
In November 2020, he was appointed player-coach of amateurs AS Le Mans Villaret.
