= Panagiotis Vosniadis =

Greek footballer

Personal information
- Date of birth: 27 July 1989 (age 37)
- Place of birth: Thessaloniki, Greece
- Height: 1.90 m (6 ft 3 in)
- Position: Goalkeeper

Team information
- Current team: Athens Kallithea FC
- Number: 13

Youth career
- 2007: Achilleas Triandrias, Odysseas Kordeliou

Senior career*
Years	Team	Apps	(Gls)
2009–2010	Pyrsos Grevena	0	(0)
2010–2011	Makedonikos Neapolis	0	(0)
2011–2012	Anagennisi Giannitsa	12	(0)
2011–2012	AEL	3	(0)
2012–2013	Iraklis	0	(0)
2013–2014	Aiginiakos	0	(0)
2014–2016	Agrotikos Asteras	38	(0)
2016–2017	Panionios	0	(0)
2017–2019	Iraklis	14	(0)
2019–2021	Veria	21	(0)
2021–	Athens Kallithea	13	(0)
- * Club domestic league appearances and goals as of 16 June 2023

Panagiotis Vosniadis (Greek: Παναγιώτης Βοσνιάδης; born 27 July 1989) is a Greek professional footballer who plays as a goalkeeper for Super League 2 club Athens Kallithea.

== Career ==
Born in Thessaloniki, Vosniadis spent the majority of his career with Iraklis, Agrotikos Asteras, and Veria.

In August 2016, he signed a one-year contract with Panionios, having the opportunity to play in Super League 1 for the first time., before returning to Iraklis for his second spell with the club.

In September 2021, Vosniadis joined Athens Kallithea FC.
