= Nikos Gyftokostas =

Greek footballer

Personal information
- Full name: Nikolaos Gyftokostas
- Date of birth: 1 July 1992 (age 34)
- Place of birth: Arta, Greece
- Height: 1.70 m (5 ft 7 in)
- Position: Winger

Senior career*
| Years | Team | Apps | (Gls) |
| 2012–2013 | Kassiopi | 15 | (0) |
| 2013–2014 | Kerkyra | 16 | (1) |
| 2014–2015 | Ermionida | 1 | (0) |
| 2015– | Karaiskakis | 45 | (0) |
- * Club domestic league appearances and goals as of 7 April 2021

Nikos Gyftokostas (Greek: Νίκος Γυφτοκώστας; born 1 July 1992) is a Greek professional footballer who plays as a winger.
