= Manolis Psomas =

Greek footballer

Personal information
- Date of birth: 11 November 1978 (age 47)
- Place of birth: Rethymno, Greece
- Height: 1.82 m (6 ft 0 in)
- Positions: Center back; left wing back

Team information
- Current team: Episkopi F.C.

Youth career
- Asteras Rethymno

Senior career*
Years	Team	Apps	(Gls)
1997–2001	Panelefsiniakos		
2001–2007	Egaleo	138	(6)
2007–2009	Asteras Tripolis	33	(0)
2009–2010	Kavala	16	(0)
2010–2011	OFI	16	(0)
2011	Levadiakos	10	(0)
2012	AEL	18	(0)
2012–2013	Episkopi		(-)
- * Club domestic league appearances and goals as of 29 July 2012 ‡ National team caps and goals as of 29 July 2012

Manolis Psomas (Greek: Μανώλης Ψωμάς; born 11 November 1978) is a football player who plays for Cretan club based in Rethymno, Episkopi.

== Career ==
=== Panelefsiniakos ===
Psomas began his career with Panelefsiniakos and made 15 Alpha Ethniki appearances for the club.

=== Egaleo ===
In 2001, Psomas signed with Egaleo. He stayed in Egaleo for 6 years, making 138 league appearances and scoring 6 goals for the club. Psomas is loved like few by Egaleo fans, for his offer and success to the team from 2001 to 2007. He also appointed as captain.

=== Asteras Tripolis ===
Manolis joined Asteras Tripolis in 2007. He stayed there until 2009, making 33 league performances, without scoring any goals. His appearances with Asteras, were result to the people talk about him. Many Greek teams were interesting to sign Psomas, for his very good defending and aerial ability and the passion he was showing.

=== Kavala ===
In 2009–2010 season, Psomas played with Kavala's jersey, appearing in 16 league matches, scoring any goals. It was Kavala's second consecutive season in Greek Super League, and the team was playing very well, with Psomas help.

=== OFI ===
In 2010, Psomas joined OFI, appearing in 16 league matches.

=== Levadiakos ===
In 2011, Psomas joined Levadiakos, as a free transfer and played 10 matches.

=== AEL ===
In January 2012, Psomas made a new step to his career signing with Greek Football League team AEL. He played till the end of the season 2012, appearing in 18 league matches.
