= Edison Gómez =

Uruguayan footballer (born 1990)

Personal information
- Full name: Edison Francisco Gómez Bentancour
- Date of birth: 14 November 1990 (age 35)
- Place of birth: Mercedes, Uruguay
- Height: 1.86 m (6 ft 1 in)
- Position: Forward

Senior career*
| Years | Team | Apps | (Gls) |
| 2009–2010 | Villa Teresa | ? | (?) |
| 2010–2011 | Agrotikos Asteras | 13 | (0) |
| 2011–? | Panserraikos | | |
- * Club domestic league appearances and goals as of 23 January 2012

Edison Francisco Gómez Bentancour (born 14 November 1990) is a Uruguayan professional footballer who plays as a forward.
