= Panagiotis Katsiaros =

Greek footballer

Personal information
- Date of birth: 8 May 1978 (age 48)
- Place of birth: Thessaloniki, Greece
- Height: 1.72 m (5 ft 7 1/2 in)
- Positions: Left full back; wingback

Youth career
- 1994–1995: Orestis Orestiada

Senior career*
Years	Team	Apps	(Gls)
1997–2004	Aris	122	(0)
2004	Panionios	6	(0)
2004–2005	Kerkyra	0	(0)
2005–2012	AEL	143	(1)
2012–2014	Olympiacos Volos	70	(2)
2014–2015	Apollon Kalamarias	13	(0)
Total		354	(3)

International career^{‡}
1997–1999	Greece U21	9	(0)
Medal record
Gold medal – first place	Greek Cup	2007
- * Club domestic league appearances and goals as of 04:00, 8 November 2015 (UTC) ‡ National team caps and goals as of 04:00, 8 November 2015 (UTC)

Panagiotis Katsiaros (Greek: Παναγιώτης Κατσιαρός; born 8 May 1978) is a Greek former professional footballer who played as a left back. He now works as a manager in the youth academies of amateur Thessaloniki based football club Ethnikos Pylaia.

== Career ==
He played for AEL in the Super League Greece, where he was the oldest member of the squad, playing from January 2005 to May 2012.

Katsiaros has also previously played in the Super League for Aris, Panionios and Kerkyra.
