= Igor Mirčeta =

Serbian footballer

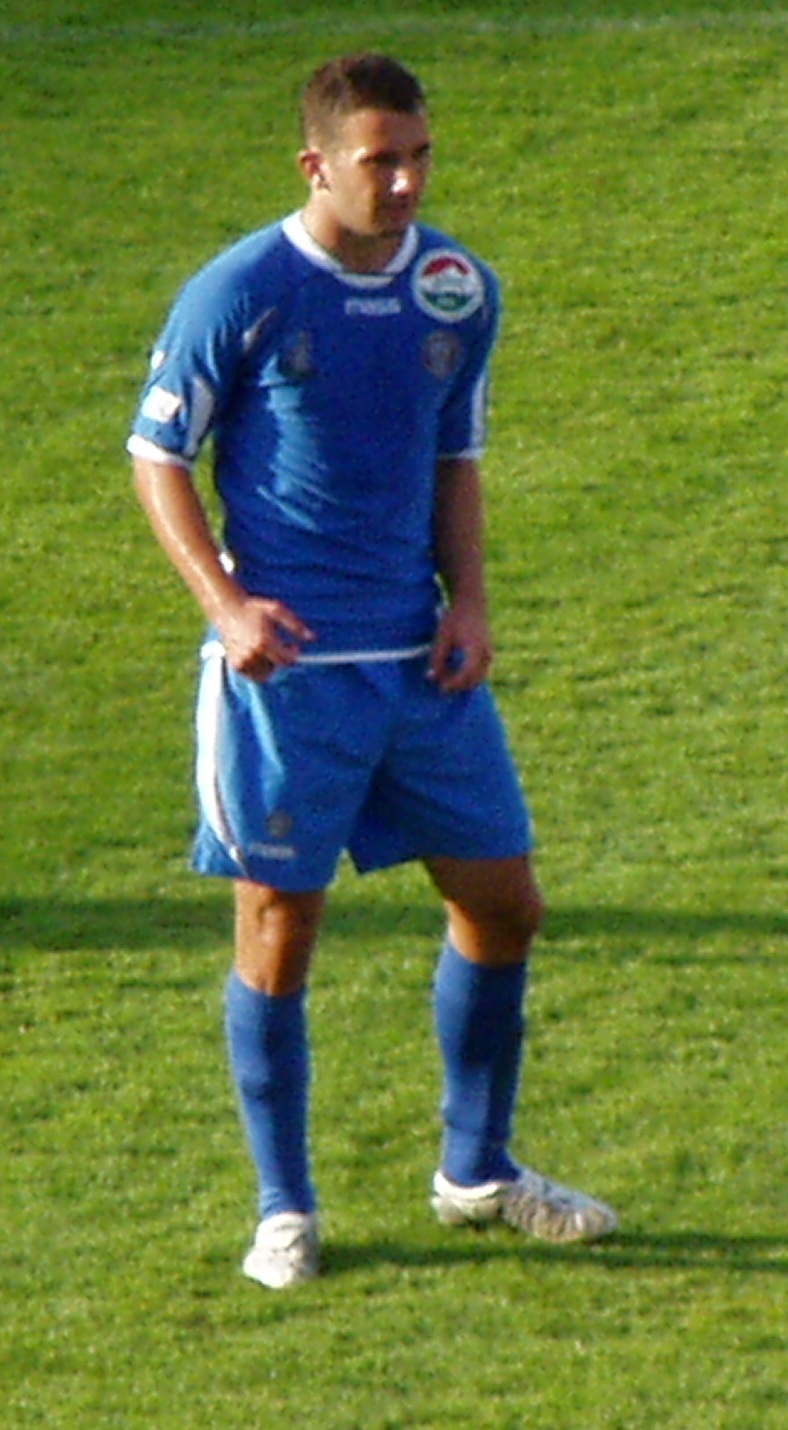

Personal information
- Date of birth: 12 December 1986 (age 39)
- Place of birth: Šibenik, SFR Yugoslavia
- Height: 1.82 m (5 ft 11 1/2 in)
- Position: Midfielder

Youth career
- Rad

Senior career*
Years	Team	Apps	(Gls)
- Rad
- BSK Borča
2005–2006	Favoritner AC	12	(1)
2006–2007	Obilić	18	(0)
2007	Radnički Pirot	13	(0)
2008	Žepče	8	(1)
2008–2009	Zalaegerszeg II	12	(3)
2009–2011	Kastoria	3	(1)
2011–2013	Platanias	55	(7)
2013–2014	Acharnaikos	12	(1)
2014	Strømmen	25	(3)
- * Club domestic league appearances and goals as of 17:13, 31 March 2015 (UTC)

Igor Mirčeta (Serbian Cyrillic: Игор Мирчета, born 12 December 1986) is a Serbian footballer who last played for Strømmen in the Norwegian First Division as a midfielder.

Born in Šibenik, SR Croatia, back then part of SFR Yugoslavia, Mirčeta played with Serbian clubs FK Rad, FK Obilić and FK Radnički Pirot. He also had a spell with FK BSK Borča after playing with Rad. In the season 2005–06 he played with Austrian side Favoritner AC. He joined Zalaegerszegi TE in 2008, where he played with the reserve team in the NB II.

He moved to Kalamata F.C. in the Greek Beta Ethniki in January 2009. He joined Kastoria F.C. in the Gamma Ethniki for the 2009–10 season. He scored his first league goal for Kastoria on 7 October 2009.
