= Antonis Vouzas =

Greek footballer

Personal information
- Full name: Antonios Vouzas
- Date of birth: 3 February 1993 (age 33)
- Place of birth: Larissa, Greece
- Height: 1.78 m (5 ft 10 in)
- Positions: Centre forward; left winger

Team information
- Current team: Fostiras F.C.
- Number: 17

Youth career
- 2008–2010: AEL U21

Senior career*
Years	Team	Apps	(Gls)
2010–2013	AEL	18	(0)
2013–	Fostiras F.C.	13	(0)

International career
2011–	Greece U-17		
- * Club domestic league appearances and goals

Antonis Vouzas (Greek: Αντώνης Βούζας; born 3 February 1993) is a Greek footballer who plays for Fostiras F.C. in the Football League (Greece), as forward.

== Club career ==
He started his career from the AEL youth teams until 18 June 2010 when he signed a five-year professional contract and moved to the first squad.
