= Dimitrios Sotiriou =

Greek footballer

Personal information
- Full name: Dimitrios Sotiriou
- Date of birth: 13 September 1987 (age 39)
- Place of birth: Martino, Phthiotis, Greece
- Height: 1.85 m (6 ft 1 in)
- Position: Goalkeeper

Team information
- Current team: OFI
- Number: 32

Youth career
- 2003–2005: Panionios

Senior career*
Years	Team	Apps	(Gls)
2006–2009	Fostiras	51	(0)
2009–2012	AEL	31	(0)
2011	→ Ethnikos Piraeus (loan)	9	(0)
2012–2013	Ermis Aradippou	27	(0)
2013–2015	PAS Giannina	7	(0)
2015–2017	Platanias	48	(0)
2017–2018	Levadiakos	5	(0)
2018–	OFI	55	(0)
- * Club domestic league appearances and goals as of 28 January 2024

Dimitrios Sotiriou (Greek: Δημήτριος Σωτηρίου; born 13 September 1987) is a Greek professional footballer who plays as a goalkeeper for Super League club OFI.

== Career ==
Born in Martino, Boeotia, Sotiriou began playing football with local side Fostiras. He was the club's first choice goalkeeper from January 2006 to the end of 2008–09 season, making 53 appearances.

On 18 June 2009 he was officially announced as a AEL player. In July 2012 he didn't follow the team's preparation due to a financial dispute and was eventually released. On 10 June 2018 he joined OFI on a free transfer. On 27 May 2019, he extended his contract until the summer of 2021.
