= Zequinha (footballer, born 1987) =

Portuguese footballer

Personal information
- Full name: José Egas dos Santos Branco
- Date of birth: 7 January 1987 (age 39)
- Place of birth: Setúbal, Portugal
- Height: 1.83 m (6 ft 0 in)
- Positions: Forward; winger

Team information
- Current team: São João de Ver
- Number: 87

Youth career
- 1994–2004: Vitória Setúbal
- 2004–2005: Porto

Senior career*
Years	Team	Apps	(Gls)
2005–2009	Porto B	3	(0)
2006–2007	→ Tourizense (loan)	18	(5)
2007	→ Penafiel (loan)	3	(0)
2008	→ Gondomar (loan)	12	(3)
2008–2009	→ Gil Vicente (loan)	26	(4)
2009–2011	Olhanense	17	(1)
2011	→ Fátima (loan)	11	(1)
2011–2013	AEL	48	(10)
2013–2014	Panthrakikos	15	(2)
2014–2015	Vitória Setúbal	42	(6)
2015–2017	Arouca	32	(2)
2017	Nacional	12	(1)
2017–2018	ATK	13	(2)
2018–2024	Vitória Setúbal	135	(44)
2024	Belenenses	12	(1)
2024–2026	Comércio Indústria	38	(13)
2026–	São João de Ver	5	(1)

International career
2002–2003	Portugal U16	10	(2)
2003–2004	Portugal U17	2	(0)
2004	Portugal U18	2	(0)
2005–2006	Portugal U19	6	(0)
2006–2007	Portugal U20	13	(4)
- * Club domestic league appearances and goals as of 13 September 2026

José Egas dos Santos Branco (born 7 January 1987), known as Zequinha, is a Portuguese professional footballer who plays as a forward or winger for Liga 3 club São João de Ver.

== Club career ==
Born in Setúbal, Zequinha was an unsuccessful youth graduate at FC Porto. He went on to serve consecutive loans in the following three years after having appeared for their reserves – and only three times – in both the country's second and third divisions (G.D. Tourizense, F.C. Penafiel, Gondomar S.C. and Gil Vicente FC).

In the summer of 2009, Zequinha was released and joined Primeira Liga newcomers S.C. Olhanense on a free transfer, penning a three-year contract. He made his debut in the competition on 16 August, playing 72 minutes in a 0–0 away draw against Associação Naval 1º de Maio.

Zequinha moved abroad in July 2011, signing for two years with Athlitiki Enosi Larissa F.C. in Greece. After two seasons in division two he signed with Panthrakikos F.C. in the Super League where he stayed until 7 January 2014, signing with his boyhood club Vitória F.C. three days later and renewing his contract for three years in December 2014.

On 11 August 2017, Zequinha joined Indian Super League franchise ATK from C.D. Nacional. He returned to Portugal and its top flight in July 2018, on a two-year deal at Vitória de Setúbal. In the 2022–23 season he scored 15 goals, but his team was relegated to the fourth tier; they had already met that fate in 2019–20 – from the main division – due to financial irregularities.

Zequinha totalled 154 appearances and 46 goals in all competitions during his second spell at the Estádio do Bonfim. On 22 January 2024, the 37-year-old free agent returned to division two by signing a one-year contract with C.F. Os Belenenses.

== International career ==
Zequinha represented Portugal at the 2007 FIFA U-20 World Cup in Canada, playing and starting all four matches for the team, albeit without scoring. In the round-of-16 defeat against Chile (1–0), he stripped referee Subkhiddin Mohd Salleh of his red card as the official was going to send his teammate Mano off; subsequently he received his marching orders as well, and both players were suspended from international football, Zequinha for one year.

== Career statistics ==
As of match played on 3 April 2018

Appearances and goals by club, season and competition
Club	Season	League			Cup		Other		Total	
Club	Season	Division	Apps	Goals	Apps	Goals	Apps	Goals	Apps	Goals
Porto B	2004–05	Segunda Divisão	1	0	—		—		1	0
Porto B	2005–06	Segunda Divisão	2	0	—		—		2	0
Porto B	Total		3	0	—		—		3	0
Tourizense (loan)	2006–07	Segunda Divisão	18	5	1	0	—		19	5
Penafiel (loan)	2007–08	Segunda Liga	3	0	3	0	—		6	0
Gondomar (loan)	2007–08	Segunda Liga	12	2	0	0	—		12	2
Gil Vicente (loan)	2008–09	Segunda Liga	26	4	5	1	—		31	5
Olhanense	2009–10	Primeira Liga	17	1	2	0	—		19	1
Fátima (loan)	2010–11	Segunda Liga	11	1	0	0	—		11	1
AEL	2011–12	Football League	19	6	1	0	—		20	6
AEL	2012–13	Football League	29	4	2	0	—		31	4
AEL	Total		48	10	3	0	—		51	10
Panthrakikos	2013–14	Super League Greece	15	2	1	0	—		16	2
Vitória Setúbal	2013–14	Primeira Liga	10	2	1	0	—		11	2
Vitória Setúbal	2014–15	Primeira Liga	31	4	6	0	—		37	4
Vitória Setúbal	2015–16	Primeira Liga	1	0	0	0	—		1	0
Vitória Setúbal	Total		42	6	7	0	—		49	6
Arouca	2015–16	Primeira Liga	25	1	6	0	—		31	1
Arouca	2016–17	Primeira Liga	7	1	3	0	3 (Note: Appearances in UEFA Europa League)	0	13	1
Arouca	Total		32	2	9	0	3	0	44	2
Nacional	2016–17	Primeira Liga	12	1	0	0	—		12	1
ATK	2017–18	Indian Super League	13	2	1	0	—		14	2
Career total			250	35	32	1	3	0	285	36
