= Dimitris Diamantis =

Greek professional footballer

Personal information
- Full name: Dimitrios Diamantis
- Date of birth: 11 September 1979 (age 47)
- Place of birth: Filiates, Greece
- Height: 1.81 m (5 ft 11 1/2 in)
- Position: Midfielder

Senior career*
Years	Team	Apps	(Gls)
2002–2005	Chaidari	31	(16)
2005–2006	Kallithea	15	(1)
2006–2007	AEL Limassol	13	(0)
2007–2008	Levadiakos	13	(0)
2008–2011	Ethnikos Asteras	94	(24)
2011–2014	Apollon Smyrnis	77	(14)
- * Club domestic league appearances and goals as of 1 July 2011

Dimitris Diamantis (Greek: Δημήτρης Διαμάντης; born 11 September 1979) is a Greek former professional footballer who played as a midfielder.

== Career ==
Born in Filiates, Diamantis began playing professional football with Chaidari F.C. in the Gamma Ethniki in 2004, after helping the club promote from the regionalized state championship. He scored 16 league goals for Chaidari, drawing attention from Kallithea F.C. who signed him to play in the next Alpha Ethniki season.

After a brief stint in Cyprus with AEL Limassol, Diamantis returned to Greece to sign with Ethnikos Asteras F.C. in July 2008.
