= Dimitrios Chasomeris =

Greek footballer (born 1989)

Personal information
- Full name: Dimitrios Chasomeris
- Date of birth: 23 June 1989 (age 37)
- Place of birth: Komotini, Greece
- Height: 1.85 m (6 ft 1 in)
- Positions: Right winger; centre forward

Youth career
- Skoda Xanthi

Senior career*
Years	Team	Apps	(Gls)
2006–2008	Skoda Xanthi	3	(0)
2008–2009	Atsalenios	31	(3)
2009–2010	Makedonikos	24	(3)
2010–2011	Anagennisi Epanomi	31	(6)
2011–2013	AEL	53	(7)
2013–2016	Panthrakikos	68	(3)
2016–2017	Trikala	1	(0)
2017–2018	Apollon Pontus	31	(9)
2018–2019	Iraklis	11	(1)
2019–2020	Apollon Pontus	24	(0)
2020	Rodos	6	(1)
2020–2021	Anagennisi Karditsa	4	(1)
2021–2022	Iraklis Larissa		
2022–2024	AE Kileler		
2024–2025	Anthoupoli		
- * Club domestic league appearances and goals as of 12 August 2021

Dimitrios Chasomeris (Greek: Δημήτριος Χασομέρης; born 23 June 1989) is a Greek former professional footballer who played as a forward.

== Career ==
=== Iraklis ===
On 8 August 2018, Chasomeris signed a contract with Iraklis, newly promoted from the 2017–18 Gamma Ethniki, on a free transfer. On 31 October, he scored his first goal for the club in an embarrassing 6–1 home win against Atromitos in the Greek Cup. On 25 November 2018, he scored his first league goal in a 3–0 home win against Sparti.
