= Jordão Diogo =

Portuguese-born São Toméan footballer

Personal information
- Full name: Jordão da Encarnação Tackey Diogo
- Date of birth: 12 November 1985 (age 40)
- Place of birth: Lisbon, Portugal
- Height: 1.84 m (6 ft 1/2 in)
- Positions: Left-back; midfielder

Youth career
- 1997–1998: Benfica
- 1998–1999: Olivais Sul
- 1999–2003: Casa Pia
- 2003–2004: Alverca

Senior career*
Years	Team	Apps	(Gls)
2004–2005	Alverca	0	(0)
2004–2005	→ Carregado (loan)		
2005–2006	Chelmsford City	10	(0)
2006–2007	Lewes		
2007–2008	Aveley		
2008–2012	KR Reykjavík	46	(0)
2010–2012	→ Panserraikos (loan)	41	(1)
2012–2013	Panachaiki	9	(0)
2013–2014	Panthrakikos	33	(0)
2014–2015	Vitória Setúbal	0	(0)
2014–2015	→ Kerkyra (loan)	22	(1)
2015–2017	Kerkyra	39	(1)
2018–2019	Levadiakos	23	(0)
2019–2020	Needham Market	13	(0)
Total		236+	(3+)

International career
2015–2019	São Tomé and Príncipe	8	(0)
- * Club domestic league appearances and goals

Jordão da Encarnação Tackey Diogo (born 12 November 1985) is a São Toméan former professional footballer who played as a left-back or a left midfielder.

== Club career ==
Born in Lisbon of São Tomé and Príncipe descent, Diogo made his senior debut in 2004 with A.D. Carregado in the fourth division, on loan from F.C. Alverca. He moved to England after one season, going on to play semi-professional football in the country with Chelmsford City, Lewes and Aveley.

Diogo had his first top-flight experience in 2008, joining Iceland's Knattspyrnufélag Reykjavíkur. He was part of the squad that won the national championship in 2011 but only appeared in two league games, also spending two years on loan to Greek club Panserraikos F.C. where he was sidelined for two months with a knee injury contracted in early November 2010.

On 23 August 2012, already as a free agent, Diogo signed for three seasons with Panachaiki F.C. in the Greek second division. He competed mostly in the country's Super League the following years after a fleeting spell at Vitória F.C. in Portugal, representing in the competition Panthrakikos FC, PAE Kerkyra and Levadiakos FC.

== International career ==
In October 2015, Diogo was called up by São Tomé and Príncipe for a 2018 FIFA World Cup qualifier against Ethiopia. He made his debut on the 8th, playing the full 90 minutes in a 1–0 home win.
