= Cesinha (footballer, born 1980) =

Brazilian footballer (born 1980)

Personal information
- Full name: Carlos César dos Santos
- Date of birth: 12 March 1980 (age 46)
- Place of birth: São Paulo, Brazil
- Height: 1.83 m (6 ft 0 in)
- Position: Winger

Senior career*
| Years | Team | Apps | (Gls) |
| 2000 | Atlético Paranaense | | |
| 2001 | Londrina | | |
| 2002 | Santa Cruz | 9 | (0) |
| 2003 | Juventude | 20 | (7) |
| 2004 | Santa Cruz | | |
| 2004–2007 | Braga | 67 | (7) |
| 2007–2011 | Rapid București | 99 | (14) |
| 2011 | AEL | 7 | (2) |
| 2012 | Moreirense | 5 | (1) |
| 2012 | Petrolul Ploiești | 2 | (0) |
| 2013–2014 | Ermis | 26 | (4) |
| 2014 | Brasiliense | 5 | (0) |
| 2015–2016 | Amarante | 40 | (11) |
| 2016–2017 | Tirsense | 28 | (6) |
| 2017–2018 | Rebordosa | 21 | (4) |
| 2018 | Cartaxo | 10 | (0) |
| 2019 | Ninense | 14 | (0) |
| Total | | 353 | (56) |
- * Club domestic league appearances and goals

Carlos César dos Santos (born 12 March 1980), known as Cesinha, is a Brazilian former footballer who played as a left winger.

== Club career ==
Born in São Paulo, Cesinha represented Esporte Clube Juventude in his country's Série A. He moved abroad in 2004, joining S.C. Braga in Portugal and making his Primeira Liga debut on 30 August by coming on as a second-half substitute in a 2–2 away draw against Académica de Coimbra; in his first season he scored in both league matches with S.C. Beira-Mar, helping to a 4–1 away win and a 1–1 home draw respectively.

In the summer of 2007, Cesinha was sold to Romanian side FC Rapid București for €600,000. He netted five goals in his debut campaign, helping his team rank third in Liga I.

Released by Rapid in 2011 at the age of 31, Césinha went on to represent several clubs in quick succession before returning to his country after signing with lowly Brasiliense Futebol Clube.

== Honours ==
Rapid București

- Supercupa României: 2007
