= Konstantinos Chatzis =

Greek footballer (born 1985)

Personal information
- Full name: Konstantinos Chatzis
- Date of birth: 22 March 1985 (age 41)
- Place of birth: Larissa, Greece
- Height: 1.81 m (5 ft 11 1/2 in)
- Position: Defensive midfielder

Youth career
- –2005: Olympiacos

Senior career*
Years	Team	Apps	(Gls)
2005–2007	Kastoria	44	(0)
2007–2008	Kalamata	29	(0)
2008–2009	Ionikos	27	(2)
2009–2010	Diagoras	12	(0)
2010–2011	Pierikos	27	(3)
2011–2014	AEL	26	(1)
2014–2015	Apollon Smyrnis	19	(1)
2015–2016	Panachaiki	10	(1)
2016–2017	Agrotikos Asteras	25	(1)
2017–2023	Apollon Larissa	116	(16)
2023	Iraklis Larissa	15	(2)
2023–2024	Ethnikos Neo Keramidi		
- * Club domestic league appearances and goals as of 17 June 2023

Konstantinos Chatzis (Greek: Κωνσταντίνος Χατζής, born 22 March 1985) is a Greek former professional footballer who played as a defensive midfielder.

== Career ==
He started his career from Olympiacos youth academies, where he stayed almost 4 years (2 as a professional player) and then tried his luck in clubs of lower leagues. In July 2011 he signed a 1+3 years contract with his hometown club AEL after having a successful season with Football League (Greece) team Agrotikos Asteras.
