= Bledi Muca =

Greek footballer (born 1988)

Personal information
- Date of birth: 6 January 1988 (age 38)
- Place of birth: Larissa, Greece
- Height: 1.81 m (5 ft 11 in)
- Positions: Left winger; attacking midfielder

Team information
- Current team: Kissavos

Youth career
- AO Pinios
- Pyrgetos
- Ampeloniakos

Senior career*
Years	Team	Apps	(Gls)
2011–2012	Oikonomos Tsaritsani	6	(2)
2012–2015	AEL	79	(13)
2015	Serres	9	(1)
2015–2017	Anagennisi Karditsa	55	(3)
2017–2019	Ierapetra		
2019	Luftëtari		
2020–2022	Diagoras Stefanovikeio		
2022–2024	Anthoupoli Larissa		
2024–	Kissavos		
- * Club domestic league appearances and goals as of 22:44, 9 June 2015 (UTC)

Bledi Muca is a Greek professional footballer who plays for Kissavos as an attacking midfielder.

== Career ==
He was born in Albania on 6 January 1988 to ethnic Albanian parents. He migrated with his family to Greece in the early 1990s. He started his career as an amateur playing in local Larissa's region teams such as Pinios, Pirgetos and Ampeloniakos. In 2011, he became professional and played in the third national division (Gamma Ethniki) with Oikonomos FC, gaining the attention of major Greek teams. Finally, on 3 January 2012, he signed a 3.5 years contract with AEL. On 1 February 2015, he solved his contract with AEL and signed with Serres
