= Joël Tshibamba =

Dutch-Congolese footballer

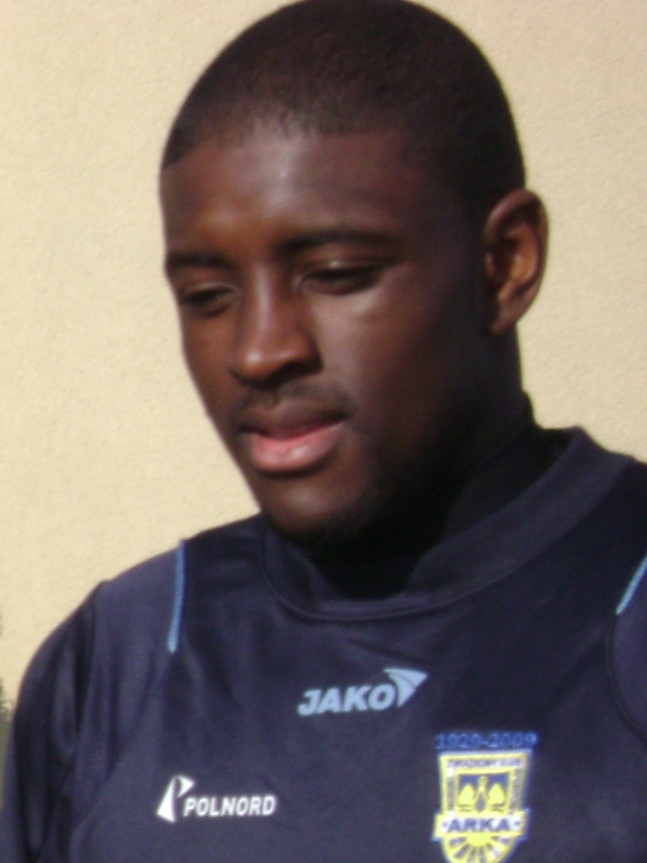
- Tshibamba with Arka Gdynia

Personal information
- Full name: Joël Omari Tshibamba
- Date of birth: 22 September 1988 (age 38)
- Place of birth: Kinshasa, Zaire
- Height: 1.88 m (6 ft 2 in)
- Position: Forward

Team information
- Current team: RKVV Rood Wit

Youth career
- SC St. Hubert
- Blauw-Wit
- Quick 1888
- NEC

Senior career*
Years	Team	Apps	(Gls)
2008–2010	NEC	10	(3)
2009	→ Oss (loan)	14	(5)
2010	Arka Gdynia	12	(5)
2010–2011	Lech Poznań	11	(0)
2011	→ AEL (loan)	12	(3)
2011–2013	AEL	24	(11)
2012	→ Krylia Sovetov (loan)	5	(0)
2013	Henan Jianye	11	(4)
2013–2015	FC Vestsjælland	11	(1)
2015	AEL	0	(0)
2015	Ulisses	0	(0)
2015	Botev Plovdiv	5	(0)
2016	Koper	1	(0)
2016	DVE-Trajanus		
2017	Doğan Türk Birliği		
2017	Warriors FC	8	(4)
2018	VW Hamme		
2019	Nocerina	4	(1)
2020–2021	Napoli United		
2021–2023	Achilles '29		
2024–	RKVV Rood Wit		
- * Club domestic league appearances and goals as of 12:29, 22 September 2024 (UTC)

Joël Omari Tshibamba (born 22 September 1988) is a Congolese professional footballer who plays as a forward for Dutch club RKVV Rood Wit.

== Club career ==
=== NEC ===
Tshibamba played for NEC's youth team before making his senior debut for the club in a 2007–08 Eredivisie playoff-match against FC Groningen. For the 2009–10 season, he was sent on loan at the affiliate club FC Oss.

On 1 December 2009, Tshibamba was sent back to NEC, after it had come clear that he had been struggling with disciplinary problems.

=== Arka Gdynia ===
On 5 January 2010, Tshibamba was given a free transfer by NEC, and about a month later he signed with Arka Gdynia of the Polish Ekstraklasa. Tshibamba started his Polish adventure well by scoring two times in the first four matches. He helped Arka to win that season against both Cracovia and Wisła Kraków.

=== Lech Poznań ===
On 17 July 2010, Tshibamba signed a contract with the current Polish champions, Lech Poznań. He made his debut for Lech Poznań in the club's 1–0 away loss at Sparta Prague in the 2010–11 UEFA Champions League third qualifying round. In October 2010, he scored his first goal for the club in a 3–1 away loss to Manchester City in the 2010–11 UEFA Europa League.

=== AEL ===
On 16 January 2011, he scored his first goal with the Greek side, in a 2–1 home victory against Iraklis. On 15 June, after a good season with Larissa, he signed a 4-year contract. Although he had shown signs of disciplinary misconduct, the fans attributed that to him needing time to adapt to his new city. He scored his first goal in the 2011–12 campaign in an impressive away 3–0 win against Veria F.C. On 18 December 2011, Tshibamba scored a hat-trick against Anagennisi Epanomi in a 5–2 win. He scored two more goals against Anagennisi Giannitswn. On 23 February 2012, he was given on loan to Krylia Sovetov till the end of the season. In September 2012 Tshibamba returned to AEL. In December 2012, he took permission for absence over Christmas but refused to return. He later claimed that he took this decision due to financial issues about his contract.

=== Henan Jianye ===
On 25 February 2013, Tshibamba was signed by China League One side Henan Jianye.

=== FC Vestsjælland ===
On 13 August 2013 Tshibamba signed a two-year deal with the Danish Superliga side FC Vestsjælland.

=== AEL ===
On 15 July 2015, Tshibamba returned and signed a two-year deal with the Greek Football League side AEL. Despite that, he never made an official appearance with the club and solve his contract on 24 August 2015.

=== Botev Plovdiv ===
After a short trial Tshibamba signed a contract with Botev Plovdiv on 11 September 2015. On 18 January 2016 Tshibamba was released from Botev Plovdiv after playing in seven games without scoring any goals.

=== Koper ===
In June 2016 he signed for FC Koper in Slovenia. He received a red card in his first official match against Rudar Velenje on 30 July 2016 after just two minutes of playing, and his contract was terminated after the match.

=== Doğan Türk Birliği ===
After a short period at Dutch amateur club DVE-Trajanus, Tshibamba joined Cypriot club Doğan Türk Birliği on 23 January 2017.

=== Warriors FC ===
Tshibamba signed for S.League side Warriors FC in March 2017, filling the club's final foreign signing slot. He signed for the club after the club scouted him using the online footballing database application, InStat, and invited him to Singapore. Tshibamba signed after being convinced that the club would be challenging for silverwares, something that Tshibamba has not been able to achieve with his past eleven clubs.

He made his debut for the Warriors in a 1–1 draw against Geylang International in match day 2 of the S.League season. Tshibamba almost scored on his debut as his header came off the post in the 35th minute. He got his first goals for the club on 8 April 2017 in a 4–3 win over Garena Young Lions, scoring a brace to help his club claw back from 3–1 down in the last ten minutes.

He was released at the mid-season transfer window due to poor performances.

=== VW Hamme ===
On 16 November 2018, Tshibamba joined Belgian club VW Hamme. After less than two months, he left the club.

=== Nocerina ===
On 29 July 2019, it was announced, that Tshibamba had joined Italian Serie D club A.S.D. Nocerina 1910. In September 2019, during an away game against AC Nardò, Tshibamba became the target of racist chants by supporters of the home club. Nardò received an official warning and a fine of €1000 from the Italian Football Federation.

After having played four games, the club announced on 18 October 2019, that the players' contract had been terminated for disciplinary reasons.
