= Dimitrios Pliagas =

Greek footballer

Personal information
- Full name: Dimitrios Pliagas
- Date of birth: 26 March 1985 (age 41)
- Place of birth: Karditsa, Greece
- Height: 1.73 m (5 ft 8 in)
- Positions: Right winger; attacking midfielder

Senior career*
Years	Team	Apps	(Gls)
2002-07	Panathinaikos		
2002–2004	→ Marko		
2004–2005	→ Proodeftiki	17	(1)
2005–2006	→ Thrasyvoulos (Loan)	25	(2)
2006-07	→ Levadiakos (Loan)	26	(2)
2007–2008	OFI	9	(0)
2008–2009	Ionikos	7	(0)
2009–2011	Olympiacos Volos	29	(3)
2011–2012	AEL	19	(1)
2012–2013	Kavala	35	(3)
2013–14	AEL	24	(2)
2014–2015	Panserraikos		
2014–2015	Dotieas Agias		
2015–2016	Achilleas Farsalon		
2016–2017	Kissavos Sykouriou		
2018–2019	Marko	2	(0)
2019–2020	Olympiakos Ampelias		
2021–2022	Achilleas Farsalon		
2022–2023	Kissavos Sykouriou		

International career
2003	Greece U17	3	(0)
2005	Greece U21	14	(4)
- * Club domestic league appearances and goals as of 24 August 2025

Dimitrios Pliagas (Greek: Δημήτριος Πλιάγκας; born 26 March 1985) is a retired Greek wide midfielder.

== Career ==
Pliagas started his professional career from Panathinaikos, but was given on loan and played in several Greek teams mostly in the Second Division, such as Thrasivoulos, Levadiakos, OFI, and Olympiacos Volos.

He made his European Competitions debut playing for OFI against FC Tobol from Kazakhstan during 2007–2008 UEFA Intertoto Cup qualifiers.
