= 2014–15 AEL Kalloni F.C. season =

AEL Kalloni
2014–15 season
- Chairman: Nikos Michalakis
- Head coach: Vangelis Vlachos
- Ground: Mytilene Municipal Stadium
- Super League Greece: 10th
- Greek Cup: Second round
- Top goalscorer: League: Juanma (7); All: Juanma (7)
Home colours	Away colours	Third colours

The 2014–15 season was AEL Kalloni's second season in the Super League Greece, the top flight of Greek football. They also participated in the Greek Cup, where they were eliminated in the second round.

== Club ==
=== Coaching staff ===
Position	Staff
Head coach	(Greece) Vangelis Vlachos
Assistant manager	(Greece) Thalis Theodoridis
Goalkeepers' coach	(Greece) Panagiotis Nasis
Fitness trainer	(Turkey) Mert İsbilir
Club doctor	(Greece) Dimitris Varvagiannis
Physiotherapist	(Greece) Thanos Karavasilis

Last updated: 16 January 2015
Source: AEL Kalloni F.C.

=== Other information ===
Chairman	Nikos Michalakis
Ground (capacity and dimensions)	Mytilene Municipal Stadium (2,850 / 102×65 metres)

Last updated: 8 August 2014
Source: AEL Kalloni F.C.

== Competitions ==
=== Overall ===
Competition	Started round	Current position / round	Final position / round	First match	Last match
Super League Greece	—	—	10th	24 August 2014	10 May 2015
Greek Cup	Second round	—	Second round	24 September 2014	7 January 2015

Last updated: 12 August 2015
Source: Competitions

=== Pre-season and friendlies ===
The preparation began on 28 June. The basic stadium of the preparation took place from 17 to 31 July to Lodrone, Trentino, Italy.

Win Draw Loss Postponed

Date	Opponents	H / A	Result F – A	Scorers
19 July 2014	(Italy) Fiorentina	N	0–3	
23 July 2014	(Italy) Val Rendena	N	7–0	Vlastellis (2) 8', 38', Agritis (3) 17', 22', 54', Bourous 31', Pelekanos 90'
24 July 2014	(England) Coventry City	N	0–0	
27 July 2014	(Cyprus) Apollon Limassol	N	1–1	Navarro 34' (pen.)
28 July 2014	(Italy) Napoli	N	1–3	Adejo 82'
30 July 2014	(Qatar) Al-Khor	N	3–0	Kripintiris 24', Navarro 47', Kyprou 60'
13 August 2014	(Italy) Udinese	H	2–2	Manousos 2', Leozinho 48' (pen.)
17 August 2014	(Turkey) Balıkesirspor	A	1–2	Adejo 5'
11 October 2014	(Turkey) Akhisar Belediyespor	H	2–2	Adejo 16', Leozinho 18'

Last updated: 11 October 2014
Source: AEL Kalloni F.C.

=== Super League Greece ===
==== League table ====
Pos	Team	Pld	W	D	L	GF	GA	GD	Pts
8	Skoda Xanthi	34	12	11	11	44	41	+3	47
9	Platanias	34	12	8	14	32	30	+2	44 (Note: Head-to-head points: Platanias 4, Kalloni 1.)
10	AEL Kalloni	34	11	11	12	34	39	−5	44
11	Panthrakikos	34	11	10	13	35	44	−9	43 (Note: Head-to-head points: Panthrakikos 11, Panionios 10, Veria 8, Levadiakos 4.)
12	Panionios	34	11	10	13	43	42	+1	43

Source: Super League Greece
Rules for classification: 1) Points; 2) Head-to-head goal difference; 3) Head-to-head points; 4) Goals scored; 5) Play-offs (neutral ground).
(Note: Criteria 5 is only used if needed to decide champion, teams for relegation or teams for UEFA competitions). In any other case, the final standings of tied teams are determined with a public draw.

==== Results summary ====
Overall								Home						Away					
Pld	W	D	L	GF	GA	GD	Pts	W	D	L	GF	GA	GD	W	D	L	GF	GA	GD
34	11	11	12	34	39	−5	44	10	5	2	23	11	+12	1	6	10	11	28	−17

Last updated: 10 May 2015.
Source: Superleague Greece

==== Results by matchday ====
Round	1	2	3	4	5	7	8	9	10	12	6	13	14	15	16	17	11	18	19	20	21	22	23	24	25	26	27	28	29	30	31	32	33	34
Ground	A	H	H	A	H	H	A	H	A	H	A	A	H	A	H	A	A	H	A	A	H	A	H	A	H	H	H	A	A	—	A	—	A	H
Result	D	W	W	L	W	W	D	D	W	D	L	L	D	D	L	D	D	L	D	L	W	L	D	L	W	W	W	L	L	W	L	W	L	D
Position	8	4	3	5	3	4	4	4	3	3	5	6	7	10	10	10	10	10	10	11	10	10	10	11	11	11	10	10	10	10	9	9	11	11

Source: Superleague Greece
A = Away; H = Home; W = Win; D = Draw; L = Loss; = Qualification to Super League Play-Offs

==== Matches ====
Win Draw Loss Postponed

24 August 2014 1	PAOK	1–1	AEL Kalloni	Thessaloniki
19:15 (UTC+3)	Spyropoulos (yellow card) 24'; M. Vítor (yellow card) 66'; Pereyra 74' (red card) 87'	Report	(yellow card) 60' (yellow-red card) 90+4' Barrera; 63' Camara; (yellow card) 82' Keita; (yellow card) 88' Leozinho	Stadium: Toumba Stadium; Attendance: –^{1} Referee: Georgios Kominis (Thesprotia)

30 August 2014 2	AEL Kalloni	2–0	Ergotelis	Mytilene
19:15 (UTC+3)	Kaltsas 43'; Llorente 89'	Report	(yellow card) 35' Fideleff; (yellow card) 56' Kozoronis; (yellow card) 67' (yellow-red card) 78' Melli	Stadium: Mytilene Municipal Stadium; Attendance: 1,856; Referee: Praxitelis Zachariadis (Macedonia)

14 September 2014 3	AEL Kalloni	1–0	Panathinaikos	Mytilene
20:30 (UTC+3)	Llorente (yellow card) 34'; Leozinho 35' (yellow card) 63'; Manousos (yellow card) 81' (yellow-red card) 86'; Hogg (yellow card) 90+1'; Chorianopoulos (yellow card) 90+3'	Report	(yellow card) 19' Bouy; (yellow card) 63' Bajrami; (yellow card) 78' Lagos; (yellow card) 80' Bourbos; (yellow card) 90+2' Klonaridis	Stadium: Mytilene Municipal Stadium; Attendance: 2,419; Referee: Stavros Tritsonis (Athens)

21 September 2014 4	Asteras Tripoli	1–0	AEL Kalloni	Tripoli
16:00 (UTC+3)	Mazza 3'; Gianniotas (yellow card) 89'; F. Parra (yellow card) 90+3'	Report	(yellow card) 61' Llorente	Stadium: Theodoros Kolokotronis Stadium; Attendance: 1,942; Referee: Anastasios Papapetrou (Athens)

29 September 2014 5	AEL Kalloni	2–0	Panthrakikos	Mytilene
19:30 (UTC+3)	Keita (yellow card) 31'; Anastasiadis 37'; Juanma (yellow card) 39'; Manousos 65'; Llorente (yellow card) 77'	Report	(yellow card) 24' Potouridis; (yellow card) 33' Tzanis; (yellow card) 45+1' Baykara	Stadium: Mytilene Municipal Stadium; Attendance: 1,098; Referee: Anastasios Sidiropoulos (Dodecanese)

19 October 2014 7	AEL Kalloni	1–0	Kerkyra	Mytilene
18:15 (UTC+3)	Kaltsas (yellow card) 42' (yellow-red card) 52'; Adejo 66'; Juanma (yellow card) 72'	Report	(yellow card) 38' Cardozo; (yellow card) 40' Venetis; (yellow card) 90+1' Gomes	Stadium: Mytilene Municipal Stadium; Attendance: 1,020; Referee: Stefanos Mantakis (Imathia)

25 October 2014 8	PAS Giannina	0–0	AEL Kalloni	Ioannina
15:00 (UTC+3)	Lila (yellow card) 21' (yellow-red card) 51'	Report		Stadium: Zosimades Stadium; Attendance: 1,414; Referee: Stavros Mantalos (Kavala)

3 November 2014 9	AEL Kalloni	0–0	Levadiakos	Mytilene
19:30 (UTC+2)	Pipinis (yellow card) 10'; Leozinho (yellow card) 26'; Kaltsas (yellow card) 32'; Anastasiadis (yellow card) 44'; Manousos (yellow card) 63'	Report	(yellow card) 3' Machairas; (yellow card) 14' Ortega; (yellow card) 66' Sánchez; (yellow card) 87' Vukčević	Stadium: Mytilene Municipal Stadium; Attendance: 941; Referee: Georgios Daskalopoulos (Corinthia)

9 November 2014 10	Panionios	0–2	AEL Kalloni	Nea Smyrni
17:15 (UTC+2)	Siopis (yellow card) 12'; Ikonomou (yellow card) 48'; Tasoulis (yellow card) 58'; Mitropoulos (yellow card) 60'	Report	(yellow card) 9' Stevanović; (penalty missed) 28' (yellow card) 31' Leozinho; (yellow card) 57' Pipinis; 66' Keita; (yellow card) 76' Navarro; 81' Juanma	Stadium: Nea Smyrni Stadium; Attendance: 1,172; Referee: Michalis Voskakis (Rethymno)

29 November 2014 12	AEL Kalloni	0–0	Platanias	Mytilene
15:00 (UTC+2)	Juanma (yellow card) 31'; Pipinis (yellow card) 37'; Keita (yellow card) 77'	Report	(yellow card) 32' Aguilera; (yellow card) 79' Tetteh	Stadium: Mytilene Municipal Stadium; Attendance: 671; Referee: Ioannis Delfakis (Arcadia)

3 December 2014 6^{2}	Skoda Xanthi	2–1	AEL Kalloni	Xanthi
17:15 (UTC+2)	Soltani 13' (yellow card) 30'; Cleyton 21' (pen.); Rudy (yellow card) 69'	Report	(yellow card) 14' (yellow-red card) 20' Pipinis; (yellow card) 39' Adejo; 52' Vallios; (yellow card) 86' Keita	Stadium: Skoda Xanthi Arena; Attendance: 884; Referee: Praxitelis Zachariadis (Macedonia)

7 December 2014 13	Niki Volos	2–0	AEL Kalloni	Volos
17:15 (UTC+2)	Karassalidis (yellow card) 39'; Shkurti 46', 77'; Tzioras (yellow card) 85'	Report	(yellow card) 14' Vallios	Stadium: Panthessaliko Stadium; Attendance: 351; Referee: Alexandros Aretopoulos (Trikala)

13 December 2014 14	AEL Kalloni	0–0	Panetolikos	Mytilene
17:15 (UTC+2)	Stevanović (yellow card) 34'	Report	(yellow card) 14' Fotakis; (yellow card) 27' Kousas; (yellow card) 75' Edjenguélé	Stadium: Mytilene Municipal Stadium; Attendance: 837; Referee: Anastasios Papapetrou (Athens)

17 December 2014 15	OFI	1–1	AEL Kalloni	Heraklion
17:15 (UTC+2)	Merebashvili (yellow card) 13'; Banousis (yellow card) 60'; Milhazes (yellow card) 63'; Tripotseris (yellow card) 69' (yellow-red card) 82'; Makris 72'	Report	(yellow card) 27' Llorente; (yellow card) 38' Kaltsas; (yellow card) 45' (goal) 70' (pen.) Juanma; (yellow card) 90+1' Keita	Stadium: Theodoros Vardinogiannis Stadium; Attendance: 3,291; Referee: Ioannis Delfakis (Arcadia)

20 December 2014 16	AEL Kalloni	0–5	Olympiacos	Mytilene
19:30 (UTC+2)	Pipinis (yellow card) 33'	Report	11' Maniatis; 63' (pen.) Domínguez; 65', 73' Benítez; 78' Bouchalakis	Stadium: Mytilene Municipal Stadium; Attendance: 2,357; Referee: Christos Mitsios (Epirus)

4 January 2015 17	Atromitos	0–0	AEL Kalloni	Peristeri
17:15 (UTC+2)	Pitu (yellow card) 66'; Dimoutsos (yellow card) 68'; Kivrakidis (yellow card) 72'	Report	(yellow card) 54' Chorianopoulos; (yellow card) 63' Juanma; (yellow card) 88' Hogg	Stadium: Peristeri Stadium; Attendance: 867; Referee: Georgios Liachoudis (Macedonia)

10 January 2015 11^{3}	Veria	1–1	AEL Kalloni	Veria
15:00 (UTC+2)	Kaltsas 8'; Battión (yellow card) 18'; Vertzos (yellow card) 90'	Report	16' Juanma; (yellow card) 23' Kaltsas	Stadium: Veria Stadium; Attendance: 777; Referee: Praxitelis Zachariadis (Macedonia)

14 January 2015 18	AEL Kalloni	1–2	PAOK	Mytilene
19:30 (UTC+2)	Kaltsas 7'; Manousos (penalty missed) 82'; Juanma (yellow card) 84'	Report	(yellow card) 35' M. Vítor; (red card) 37' Kaçe; (yellow card) 42' Papadopoulos; 50', 58' Pereyra; (yellow card) 54' Tzandaris; (yellow card) 68' Athanasiadis; (yellow card) 70' Salpingidis; (yellow card) 81' Konstantinidis	Stadium: Mytilene Municipal Stadium; Attendance: 1,183; Referee: Christos Mitsios (Epirus)

19 January 2015 19	Ergotelis	3–3	AEL Kalloni	Heraklion
19:30 (UTC+2)	Kaznaferis (yellow card) 19'; Chanti 67', 73'; Louvion (yellow card) 90'; Kozoronis 90+3'	Report	20' (pen.) Leozinho; (yellow card) 21' (yellow-red card) 90+6' Keita; (yellow card) 28' (yellow-red card) 45' Llorente; (yellow card) 29' (goal) 39' Juanma; (yellow card) 31' Kaltsas; 85' Mingas	Stadium: Pankritio Stadium; Attendance: 1,148; Referee: Konstantinos Ioannidis (Argolis)

25 January 2015 20	Panathinaikos	1–0	AEL Kalloni	Athens
19:30 (UTC+2)	Chouchoumis (yellow card) 67'; Bourbos (yellow card) 69'; Lagos (yellow card) 73'; Berg 78'; Tavlaridis (yellow card) 90'; Petrić (yellow card) 90+3'	Report	(yellow card) 45+2' Hogg; (yellow card) 75' M. Goianira; (yellow card) 82' Manousos	Stadium: Leoforos Alexandras Stadium; Attendance: 4,906; Referee: Athanasios Giachos (Chios)

31 January 2015 21	AEL Kalloni	1–0	Asteras Tripoli	Mytilene
17:15 (UTC+2)	Juanma (yellow card) 44'; Tsabouris 74'; Leozinho (yellow card) 79'; Keita (yellow card) 90+6'	Report	(yellow card) 14' Sankaré; (yellow card) 85' Iglesias; (yellow card) 90+5' Goian	Stadium: Mytilene Municipal Stadium; Attendance: 329; Referee: Andreas Pappas (Athens)

5 February 2015 22	Panthrakikos	3–2	AEL Kalloni	Komotini
19:30 (UTC+2)	M'Bow 14'; Igor 44' (pen.); Tsabouris 49' (o.g.); Iliadis (red card) 73'	Report	20', 74' (pen.) Manousos; (yellow card) 43' Pipinis; (yellow card) 81' Llorente	Stadium: Komotini Municipal Stadium; Attendance: 1,266; Referee: Georgios Kyzas (Drama)

9 February 2015 23	AEL Kalloni	2–2	Skoda Xanthi	Mytilene
19:30 (UTC+2)	Petropoulos (yellow card) 62'; Juanma 68', 72'; Chorianopoulos (yellow card) 85'	Report	(yellow card) 23' Lisgaras; 32' Soltani; (yellow card) 58' Papasterianos; 78' Lucero; (yellow card) 83' Papazoglou; (yellow card) 90' Bertos; (yellow card) 90+2' Vasilakakis	Stadium: Mytilene Municipal Stadium; Attendance: 291; Referee: Praxitelis Zachariadis (Macedonia)

15 February 2015 24	Kerkyra	2–0	AEL Kalloni	Corfu
17:15 (UTC+2)	Kajkut (yellow card) 22' (goal) 55' (pen.); Diogo 77'; Andreopoulos (yellow card) 90'	Report	(yellow card) 19' (yellow-red card) 33' Adejo; (yellow card) 23' Manousos; (yellow card) 33' Pipinis	Stadium: Kerkyra Stadium; Attendance: 789; Referee: Georgios Daskalopoulos (Corinthia)

21 February 2015 25	AEL Kalloni	1–0	PAS Giannina	Mytilene
17:15 (UTC+2)	Petropoulos 3'; Keita (yellow card) 18'; Jordi Vidal (yellow card) 42'; Tsabouris (yellow card) 90'; Juanma (yellow card) 90+2'	Report	(yellow card) 57' (yellow-red card) 90+2' Berios	Stadium: Mytilene Municipal Stadium; Attendance: 444; Referee: Charalambos Kalogeropoulos (Athens)

8 March 2015 27	AEL Kalloni	1–0	Panionios	Mytilene
15:00 (UTC+2)	Stevanović (yellow card) 57'; Kripintiris (yellow card) 66'; Petropoulos 78'	Report	(yellow card) 15' Fountas; (yellow card) 33' Risvanis	Stadium: Mytilene Municipal Stadium; Attendance: –^{4} Referee: Alexandros Aretopoulos (Trikala)

15 March 2015 28	AEL Kalloni	4–1	Veria	Mytilene
17:15 (UTC+2)	Juanma 12' (penalty missed) 19' (yellow card) 25'; Leozinho 17', 71'; Manousos (yellow card) 87'; Adejo 90+3'	Report	16' Kaltsas; (yellow card) 27' Vertzos	Stadium: Mytilene Municipal Stadium; Attendance: –^{4} Referee: Ilias Spathas (Piraeus)

18 March 2015 26^{5}	Levadiakos	3–0	AEL Kalloni	Livadeia
17:15 (UTC+2)	Bustamante 17'; Kotsios 29'; Petropoulos 45+1' (o.g.)	Report	(yellow card) 40' Kaltsas; (yellow card) 42' Leozinho; (yellow card) 90' Keita	Stadium: Levadia Municipal Stadium; Attendance: 549; Referee: Konstantinos Ioannidis (Argolis)

23 March 2015 29	Platanias	1–0	AEL Kalloni	Mournies
19:30 (UTC+2)	Itoua (yellow card) 29'; Torres 47'; Olimpa (yellow card) 75'; Apostolopoulos (yellow card) 89'	Report	(yellow card) 8' Manousos; (yellow card) 12' Anastasiadis; (yellow card) 21' Kaltsas; (yellow card) 31' Leozinho; (yellow card) 88' Xydas	Stadium: Perivolia Municipal Stadium; Attendance: 1,191; Referee: Stavros Mantalos (Kavala)

– 30	AEL Kalloni	3–0 (w/o)^{6}	Niki Volos	–
–				Stadium: – Attendance: – Referee: –

18 April 2015 31	Panetolikos	2–0	AEL Kalloni	Agrinio
15:00 (UTC+3)	Martínez 16'; André Alves (yellow card) 30'; Villafáñez (yellow card) 71'; Godoy (yellow card) 89'; Tsabouris 90+1' (o.g.)	Report	(yellow card) 30' Kaltsas	Stadium: Panetolikos Stadium; Attendance: 2,182; Referee: Ioannis Delfakis (Arcadia)

– 32	AEL Kalloni	3–0 (w/o)^{6}	OFI	–
–				Stadium: – Attendance: – Referee: –

3 May 2015 33	Olympiacos	5–0	AEL Kalloni	Piraeus
19:00 (UTC+3)	Benítez 13'; Fortounis 39'; Domínguez 57'; Mitroglou 80', 85' (pen.); Durmaz (yellow card) 87'	Report	(yellow card) 12' Stevanović; (yellow card) 72' M. Goianira	Stadium: Karaiskakis Stadium; Attendance: 31,343; Referee: Georgios Kyzas (Drama)

10 May 2015 34	AEL Kalloni	1–1	Atromitos	Mytilene
19:00 (UTC+3)	Keita (yellow card) 13'; Mingas 23'	Report	(yellow card) 73' Umbides; 83' Papazoglou	Stadium: Mytilene Municipal Stadium; Attendance: 1,059; Referee: Georgios Daskalopoulos (Corinthia)

1.PAOK were punished to give two matches without spectators in their home because of riots during the match against Olympiacos on 16 April 2014 for the Greek Cup.
2.Matchday 6 had been suspended after the decision of the Deputy Minister of Culture and Sport, Giannis Andrianos, in memory of Kostas Katsoulis, that was killed in the riots during the match between Irodotos and Ethnikos Piraeus on 14 September 2014 for the Football League 2. See Football hooliganism#Greece for more information.
3.Matchday 11 had been suspended after the decision of the Hellenic Football Federation president, Giorgos Sarris, not to put referees in matches, because of the attack that was made against referee Christoforos Zografos.
4.After the decision of the Deputy Minister of Sports, Stavros Kondonis, all matches of Matchdays 27 and 28 were held without spectators.
5.Matchday 26 was suspended after the decision of the Deputy Minister of Sports, Stavros Kondonis, in order to be made resolutions on combating violence in Greek football.
6.Niki Volos and OFI retired from the league on January and March 2015 respectively.

Last updated: 10 May 2015
Source: Superleague Greece

=== Greek Cup ===
==== Second round ====
Pos	Team	Pld	W	D	L	GF	GA	GD	Pts	Qualification	AST	TYR	KAL	AIG
1	Asteras Tripolis	3	2	1	0	7	3	+4	7	Round of 16		—	2–1	—
2	Tyrnavos	3	1	2	0	4	3	+1	5	Round of 16	1–1		—	2–1
3	Kalloni	3	1	1	1	7	3	+4	4		—	1–1		5–0
4	Aiginiakos	3	0	0	3	2	11	−9	0		1–4	—	—	

Source: epo.gr

Win Draw Loss Postponed

24 September 2014 1	AEL Kalloni	1–1	Tyrnavos	Mytilene
16:30 (UTC+3)	Manousos 19' (pen.); Chorianopoulos (yellow card) 80'	Report	43' Milutinović; (red card) 74' Stergianos-Michailidis	Stadium: Mytilene Municipal Stadium; Attendance: n/a Referee: Konstantinos Kotsanis (Drama)

29 October 2014 2	Asteras Tripoli	2–1	AEL Kalloni	Tripoli
17:15 (UTC+2)	Kyriakopoulos (yellow card) 65'; Fernández 69', 77'	Report	(yellow card) 22' Chorianopoulos; 40' (pen.) Agritis; (yellow card) 48' Vallios; (yellow card) 51' Pipinis; (yellow card) 61' Kaltsas	Stadium: Theodoros Kolokotronis Stadium; Attendance: n/a Referee: Alexandros Aretopoulos (Trikala)

7 January 2015 3	AEL Kalloni	5–0	Aiginiakos	Mytilene
15:00 (UTC+2)	Camara 1', 75'; Vlastellis 36'; Agritis 53'; Xydas 90+1'	Report		Stadium: Mytilene Municipal Stadium; Attendance: n/a Referee: Stavros Mantalos (Kavala)

Last updated: 7 January 2015
Source: HFF

== Players ==
=== Squad statistics ===
==== Appearances and goals ====
Key

**No.** = Squad number

**Pos.** = Playing position

**Apps** = Appearances

**GK** = Goalkeeper

**DF** = Defender

**MF** = Midfielder

**FW** = Forward

Numbers in parentheses denote appearances as substitute. Players with number struck through and marked † left the club during the playing season.

As of 10 May 2015

No.	Pos.	Name	Super League Greece		Greek Cup		Total	
No.	Pos.	Name	Apps	Goals	Apps	Goals	Apps	Goals
1	GK	(Greece) Kostas Dafkos	0	0	1	0	1	0
3	DF	(Greece) Christos Pipinis	14 (7)	0	3	0	17 (7)	0
4	DF	(Nigeria) Daniel Adejo	31	2	2	0	33	2
6	MF	(Greece) Michalis Kripintiris	4 (1)	0	1	0	5 (1)	0
7	MF	(Algeria) Salim Arrache	0 (5)	0	0	0	0 (5)	0
9	FW	(Greece) Giorgos Manousos (c)	27 (1)	3	2 (1)	1	29 (2)	4
10	MF	(Brazil) Leozinho	25 (4)	4	0	0	25 (4)	4
11	MF	(Greece) Dimitris Vlastellis (c)	0	0	2	1	2	1
12	MF	(Greece) Giorgos Chorianopoulos (c)	4 (4)	0	2	0	6 (4)	0
13	FW	(Greece) Anestis Agritis	0 (4)	0	2 (1)	2	2 (5)	2
14	DF	(Greece) Anestis Anastasiadis	29	1	0	0	29	1
16	MF	(Serbia) Ljubomir Stevanović	6 (7)	0	3	0	9 (7)	0
17	GK	(Malta) Andrew Hogg	29	0	0	0	29	0
18	MF	(Brazil) Marcelo Goianira	5 (5)	0	0	0	5 (5)	0
19	FW	(Spain) Juanma	24 (2)	7	0	0	24 (2)	7
20	MF	(Spain) Jordi Vidal Martín Rojas	1	0	0	0	1	0
21	DF	(Spain) Raúl Llorente	23 (3)	1	1	0	24 (3)	1
22	MF	(Greece) Giannis Giorgou	0 (2)	0	0 (1)	0	0 (3)	0
23	FW	(Greece) Dimitris Bourous	0	0	0 (2)	0	0 (2)	0
24	MF	(Senegal) Paul Keita	26 (2)	1	0 (1)	0	26 (3)	1
25	MF	(Spain) Ximo Navarro	13 (10)	0	1	0	14 (10)	0
26	MF	(Greece) Rafail Gioukaris	0	0	0 (1)	0	0 (1)	0
27	MF	(Greece) Nikos Kaltsas	26 (2)	2	1	0	27 (2)	2
28	FW	(Greece) Giorgos Xydas	0 (2)	0	0 (1)	1	0 (3)	1
31	MF	(Greece) Savvas Tsabouris	18 (1)	1 (2)	2	0	20 (1)	1 (2)
32	MF	(Ghana) Abdul Razak	0 (1)	0	0	0	0 (1)	0
33	MF	(Greece) Christos Mingas	11 (9)	2	2	0	13 (9)	2
40	GK	(Greece) Nikos Mallis	0	0	0	0	0	0
55	DF	(Greece) Stratis Vallios	16	1	1	0	17	1
71	GK	(Serbia) Branimir Aleksić	3	0	2	0	5	0
95	MF	(Greece) Aggelos Giazitzoglou	0	0	0	0	0	0
99	FW	(Greece) Antonis Petropoulos	8 (3)	2 (1)	0	0	8 (3)	2 (1)
—	DF	(Greece) Kyriakos Evaggelidakis	0	0	0	0	0	0
—	DF	(Argentina) Marcos Barrera †	3 (7)	0	2	0	5 (7)	0
—	FW	(Senegal) Henri Camara †	6 (7)	1	2	2	8 (7)	3
—	FW	(Cyprus) Theodosis Kyprou †	0 (7)	0	1 (1)	0	1 (8)	0
—	–	Own goals	–	3	–	0	–	3

Source: Superleague Greece

==== Top scorers ====
As of 10 May 2015

Place	Position	Nationality	Number	Name	Super League	Greek Cup	Total
1	FW	(Spain)	19	Juanma	7	0	7
2	MF	(Brazil)	10	Leozinho	4	0	4
2	FW	(Greece)	9	Giorgos Manousos	3	1	4
3	FW	(Senegal)	7	Henri Camara	1	2	3
4	DF	(Nigeria)	4	Daniel Adejo	2	0	2
4	FW	(Greece)	13	Anestis Agritis	0	2	2
4	MF	(Greece)	27	Nikos Kaltsas	2	0	2
4	MF	(Greece)	33	Christos Mingas	2	0	2
4	FW	(Greece)	99	Antonis Petropoulos	2	0	2
5
5	DF	(Greece)	14	Anestis Anastasiadis	1	0	1
5	MF	(Senegal)	24	Paul Keita	1	0	1
5	DF	(Spain)	21	Raúl Llorente	1	0	1
5	MF	(Greece)	31	Savvas Tsabouris	1	0	1
5	DF	(Greece)	55	Stratis Vallios	1	0	1
5	MF	(Greece)	11	Dimitris Vlastellis	0	1	1
5	FW	(Greece)	28	Giorgos Xydas	0	1	1
**TOTALS**					**28**	**7**	35

Source: Superleague Greece

===== Own goals =====
MD	Opponent	H / A	Player	Score	Result
22	Panthrakikos	A	(Greece) Savvas Tsabouris	1–**3**	2–3
26	Levadiakos	A	(Greece) Antonis Petropoulos	0–**3**	0–3
31	Panetolikos	A	(Greece) Savvas Tsabouris	0–**2**	0–2

Source: Superleague Greece

==== Disciplinary record ====
As of 10 May 2015

**Number**	**Nationality**	**Position**	**Name**	**Super League**		**Greek Cup**		Total	
**Number**	**Nationality**	**Position**	**Name**	Yellow card	Red card	Yellow card	Red card	Yellow card	Red card
24	(Senegal)	MF	Paul Keita	9	1*	0	0	9	1
27	(Greece)	MF	Nikos Kaltsas	7	1*	1	0	8	1
3	(Greece)	DF	Christos Pipinis	6	1*	1	0	7	1
21	(Spain)	DF	Raúl Llorente	5	1*	0	0	5	1
9	(Greece)	FW	Giorgos Manousos	5	1*	0	0	5	1
4	(Nigeria)	DF	Daniel Adejo	1	1*	0	0	1	1
2	(Argentina)	DF	Marcos Barrera	0	1*	0	0	0	1
19	(Spain)	FW	Juanma	10	0	0	0	10	0
10	(Brazil)	MF	Leozinho	7	0	0	0	7	0
12	(Greece)	MF	Giorgos Chorianopoulos	3	0	2	0	5	0
16	(Serbia)	MF	Ljubomir Stevanović	4	0	0	0	4	0
17	(Malta)	GK	Andrew Hogg	3	0	0	0	3	0
14	(Greece)	DF	Anestis Anastasiadis	2	0	0	0	2	0
18	(Brazil)	MF	Marcelo Goianira	2	0	0	0	2	0
55	(Greece)	DF	Stratis Vallios	1	0	1	0	2	0
20	(Spain)	MF	Jordi Vidal Martín Rojas	1	0	0	0	1	0
6	(Greece)	DF	Michalis Kripintiris	1	0	0	0	1	0
25	(Spain)	MF	Ximo Navarro	1	0	0	0	1	0
99	(Greece)	FW	Antonis Petropoulos	1	0	0	0	1	0
31	(Greece)	MF	Savvas Tsabouris	1	0	0	0	1	0
28	(Greece)	FW	Giorgos Xydas	1	0	0	0	1	0
			**TOTALS**	**71**	**7**	**5**	**0**	76	7

Last updated: 10 May 2015
Competitive matches only
* indicates a second yellow card ( (yellow card) (yellow-red card) )
Source: Superleague Greece

==== Suspended players ====
Date	Pos.	Name	Reason	Return date
23 August 2014	FW	(Spain) Juanma	Suspended from last season	30 August 2014
23 August 2014	MF	(Greece) Christos Mingas	Suspended from last season	30 August 2014
30 August 2014	DF	(Argentina) Marcos Barrera	Suspended on Matchday 1 vs. PAOK	14 September 2014
21 September 2014	FW	(Greece) Giorgos Manousos	Suspended on Matchday 3 vs. Panathinaikos	24 September 2014
25 October 2014	MF	(Greece) Nikos Kaltsas	Suspended on Matchday 7 vs. AOK	29 October 2014
7 December 2014	DF	(Greece) Christos Pipinis	Suspended on Matchday 6 vs. Skoda Xanthi	13 December 2014
20 December 2014	FW	(Spain) Juanma	Yellow cards	4 January 2015
20 December 2014	MF	(Senegal) Paul Keita	Yellow cards	4 January 2015
4 January 2015	DF	(Spain) Raúl Llorente	Yellow cards	7 January 2015
10 January 2015	MF	(Brazil) Leozinho	Yellow cards	14 January 2015
19 January 2015	DF	(Greece) Christos Pipinis	Yellow cards	24 January 2015
24 January 2015	DF	(Spain) Raúl Llorente	Suspended on Matchday 19 vs. Ergotelis	31 January 2015
24 January 2015	MF	(Senegal) Paul Keita	Suspended on Matchday 19 vs. Ergotelis	31 January 2015
24 January 2015	FW	(Spain) Juanma	Yellow cards	31 January 2015
5 February 2015	FW	(Spain) Juanma	Yellow cards	9 February 2015
9 February 2015	MF	(Greece) Nikos Kaltsas	Yellow cards	15 February 2015
21 February 2015	DF	(Nigeria) Daniel Adejo	Suspended on Matchday 24 vs. AOK	8 March 2015
8 March 2015	MF	(Senegal) Paul Keita	Yellow cards	15 March 2015
23 March 2015	MF	(Senegal) Paul Keita	Yellow cards	18 April 2015
18 April 2015	FW	(Spain) Juanma	Yellow cards	3 May 2015
3 May 2015	MF	(Greece) Nikos Kaltsas	Yellow cards	10 May 2015
10 May 2015	MF	(Serbia) Ljubomir Stevanović	Yellow cards	—

Source: AEL Kalloni F.C.

==== Injuries ====
Players in bold are still out from their injuries.
Players listed will/have miss(ed) at least one competitive game (missing from the whole matchday squad).

Date	Pos.	Name	Recovery time	Return date*
23 August 2014	MF	(Spain) Ximo Navarro	1 week	30 August 2014
23 August 2014	DF	(Greece) Christos Pipinis	1 week	30 August 2014
23 August 2014	MF	(Serbia) Ljubomir Stevanović	4 weeks	21 September 2014
30 August 2014	FW	(Senegal) Henri Camara	2 weeks	14 September 2014
29 September 2014	FW	(Senegal) Henri Camara	6 weeks	9 November 2014
29 September 2014	FW	(Greece) Anestis Agritis	3 weeks	19 October 2014
25 October 2014	MF	(Greece) Dimitris Vlastellis	2 weeks	9 November 2014
3 November 2014	DF	(Spain) Raúl Llorente	3 weeks	29 November 2014
9 November 2014	FW	(Greece) Giorgos Manousos	3 days	29 November 2014
12 November 2014	DF	(Nigeria) Daniel Adejo	12 days	29 November 2014
21 November 2014	MF	(Greece) Giannis Giorgou	5 days	29 November 2014
21 November 2014	FW	(Cyprus) Theodosis Kyprou	1 week	7 December 2014
12 December 2014	FW	(Greece) Dimitris Bourous	3 months	8 March 2015
19 December 2014	FW	(Senegal) Henri Camara	2 weeks	4 January 2015
19 December 2014	MF	(Greece) Savvas Tsabouris	2 weeks	4 January 2015
19 December 2014	DF	(Greece) Stratis Vallios	18 days	5 January 2015
20 December 2014	MF	(Serbia) Ljubomir Stevanović	18 days	5 January 2015
3 January 2015	MF	(Brazil) Leozinho	1 week	14 January 2015
18 January 2015	DF	(Greece) Stratis Vallios	50 days	8 March 2015
14 February 2015	FW	(Greece) Anestis Agritis	1 week	21 February 2015
8 March 2015	DF	(Greece) Anestis Anastasiadis	1 week	15 March 2015
8 March 2015	DF	(Greece) Christos Pipinis	1 week	15 March 2015
8 March 2015	MF	(Spain) Jordi Vidal Martín Rojas	1 week	15 March 2015
16 April 2015	GK	(Greece) Kostas Dafkos		
16 April 2015	GK	(Malta) Andrew Hogg	5–6 weeks	
16 April 2015	DF	(Greece) Michalis Kripintiris		
16 April 2015	DF	(Greece) Stratis Vallios		

- 'Return date' is date that player returned to matchday squad.

As of 10 May 2015

Source: AEL Kalloni F.C.

==== Best Goal and MVP awards and nominees ====
MD	Opponent	H / A	Name	Pos.	for	Status
2	Ergotelis	H	(Greece) Nikos Kaltsas	MF	Best Goal	Won
3	Panathinaikos	H	(Brazil) Leozinho	MF	MVP	Won
10	Panionios	A	(Malta) Andrew Hogg	GK	MVP	Won
28	Veria	H	(Brazil) Leozinho	MF	Best Goal	Nominated
27	Panionios	H	(Greece) Antonis Petropoulos	FW	MVP	Nominated

Source: AEL Kalloni F.C.

=== Transfers ===
==== Summer ====
===== In =====
Date	Pos.	Name	From	Fee
12 May 2014	FW	(Senegal) Henri Camara	(Greece) Panetolikos	Free
19 June 2014	GK	(Greece) Kostas Dafkos	(Greece) Doxa Drama	Unknown
19 June 2014	DF	(Greece) Christos Pipinis	(Cyprus) APOEL	Free
19 June 2014	MF	(Greece) Christos Mingas	(Greece) Apollon Smyrni	Free
19 June 2014	FW	(Spain) Juanma	(Greece) Asteras Tripoli	Free
20 June 2014	MF	(Serbia) Ljubomir Stevanović	(North Macedonia) Metalurg Skopje	Unknown
27 June 2014	DF	(Argentina) Marcos Barrera	(Bolivia) The Strongest	Unknown
1 July 2014	MF	(Spain) Ximo Navarro	(Greece) Asteras Tripoli	Unknown
17 July 2014	DF	(Nigeria) Daniel Adejo	(Italy) Reggina	Unknown
21 July 2014	GK	(Serbia) Branimir Aleksić	(Serbia) Spartak Subotica	Unknown
21 August 2014	MF	(Greece) Giannis Giorgou	Youth system	–
29 August 2014	MF	(Ghana) Abdul Razak	(Greece) Syros	Unknown
31 August 2014	MF	(Greece) Savvas Tsabouris	(Greece) Asteras Tripoli	Unknown

===== Out =====
Date	Pos.	Name	To	Fee
n/a	MF	(Brazil) Marcelo Goianira	Unattached (Released)	
n/a	MF	(Greece) Nikos Kalfas	Unattached (Released)	
n/a	MF	(Albania) Xhonatan Muça	(Greece) Vataniakos	Free
n/a	MF	(Greece) Zisis–Aggelos Naoum	Unattached (Released)	
5 May 2014	DF	(France) Maxime Josse	Unattached (Released)	
5 May 2014	FW	(France) Guy Gnabouyou	(Malta) Sliema Wanderers	Free
19 May 2014	MF	(Spain) Jonan García	Unattached (Released)	
21 May 2014	MF	(Portugal) Hugo Faria	(Malta) Valletta	Free
28 June 2014	GK	(Greece) Lefteris Mappas	(Greece) Aiolikos	Free
28 June 2014	MF	(Greece) Nikos Galas	(Greece) Aiolikos	Free
2 July 2014	GK	(Greece) Giannis Siderakis	(Cyprus) Doxa Katokopias	Free
2 July 2014	MF	(Greece) Charalambos Siligardakis	(Greece) Chania	Free
2 July 2014	FW	(Greece) Vlasis Kazakis	(Greece) Aiginiakos	Free
3 July 2014	FW	(Greece) Andreas Dambos	(Greece) Fokikos	Free
3 July 2014	FW	(Argentina) Emanuel Perrone	(Greece) Iraklis Thessaloniki	Free

===== Loaned out =====
Date	Pos.	Name	To	Duration
21 August 2014	DF	(Greece) Kyriakos Evangelidakis	(Greece) Fokikos	Ended

==== Winter ====
===== In =====
Date	Pos.	Name	From	Fee
2 January 2015	FW	(Greece) Giorgos Xydas	Youth system	–
8 January 2015	MF	(Brazil) Marcelo Goianira	Free agent	
21 January 2015	FW	(Greece) Antonis Petropoulos	OFI	Free
30 January 2015	MF	(Spain) Jordi Vidal Martín Rojas	Kallithea	Unknown
12 February 2015	MF	(Algeria) Salim Arrache	Free agent	
21 April 2015	GK	(Greece) Nikos Mallis	Youth system	–

===== Out =====
Date	Pos.	Name	To	Fee
30 December 2014	FW	(Cyprus) Theodosis Kyprou	Unattached (Released)	
15 January 2015	DF	(Argentina) Marcos Barrera	(Peru) Deportivo Municipal	Unknown
1 February 2015	FW	(Senegal) Henri Camara	(Greece) Lamia	Free

===== Loaned out =====
Date	Pos.	Name	To	Duration
January 2015	MF	(Ghana) Abdul Razak	(Greece) Anagennisi Gera	Ended

== Infrastructure leagues ==
=== U20 ===
Win Draw Loss Postponed

Date	Opponents	H / A	Result F – A
30 August 2014	Ergotelis	H	1–0
13 September 2014	Panathinaikos	H	1–5
21 September 2014	Asteras Tripoli	A	0–1
28 September 2014	Panthrakikos	H	3–3
25 October 2014	PAS Giannina	A	1–2
28 October 2014	PAOK	A	1–5
1 November 2014	Levadiakos	H	1–0
30 November 2014	Platanias	H	0–2
3 December 2014	Skoda Xanthi	A	1–1
7 December 2014	Niki Volos	A	1–3
14 December 2014	Panetolikos	H	1–3
17 December 2014	OFI	A	0–2
20 December 2014	Olympiacos	H	1–1
4 January 2015	Atromitos	A	1–5
10 January 2015	Veria	A	2–4
17 January 2015	Ergotelis	A	0–2
24 January 2015	Panathinaikos	A	1–1
31 January 2015	Asteras Tripoli	H	1–0
4 February 2015	Panionios	A	1–2
9 February 2015	Skoda Xanthi	H	1–1
14 February 2015	AOK	A	0–1
22 February 2015	PAS Giannina	H	5–1
28 February 2015	Levadiakos	A	1–3
7 March 2015	Panionios	H	1–3
14 March 2015	Veria	H	0–1
23 March 2015	Platanias	A	0–1
29 March 2015	AOK	H	1–0
–	Niki Volos	H	3–0 (w/o)*
8 April 2015	PAOK	H	1–5
18 April 2015	Panetolikos	A	1–2
26 April 2015	OFI	H	1–0
2 May 2015	Olympiacos	A	0–3
10 May 2015	Atromitos	H	3–3
17 May 2015	Panthrakikos	A	1–2

* Niki Volos retired from the league.

Pos	Club	Pld	Pts
14	Ergotelis	34	33
15	AEL Kalloni	34	27
16	Platanias	34	24

Pos = Position; Pld = Matches played; Pts = Points

=== U17 ===
Group A

Win Draw Loss Postponed

Date	Opponents	H / A	Result F – A
14 September 2014	Asteras Tripoli	A	0–1
21 September 2014	Atromitos	H	0–3
28 September 2014	Olympiacos	A	1–4
12 October 2014	Ergotelis	A	0–4
26 October 2014	Panathinaikos	A	0–7
9 November 2014	Levadiakos	A	0–2
15 November 2014	Panionios	H	0–2
29 November 2014	Atromitos	A	2–4
7 December 2014	Olympiacos	H	1–2
13 December 2014	Panionios	A	2–4
23 December 2014	OFI	H	3–0
3 January 2015	Ergotelis	H	1–0
5 January 2015	Platanias	H	0–1
11 January 2015	Platanias	A	3–4
18 January 2015	Panathinaikos	H	1–1
24 January 2015	OFI	A	2–0
1 February 2015	Levadiakos	H	1–1
7 February 2015	Asteras Tripoli	H	1–1
22 February 2015	OFI	H	0–1
1 March 2015	Panathinaikos	A	1–7
7 March 2015	Olympiacos	A	0–3
15 March 2015	Levadiakos	H	1–2
22 March 2015	Panionios	A	1–6
29 March 2015	Platanias	H	1–1
6 April 2015	Asteras Tripoli	A	0–1
19 April 2015	Atromitos	H	0–2
26 April 2015	Ergotelis	A	2–3

Pos	Club	Pld	Pts
8	Levadiakos	27	29
9	AEL Kalloni	27	13
10	OFI	27	13

Pos = Position; Pld = Matches played; Pts = Points

=== U15 ===
Group A

Win Draw Loss Postponed

Date	Opponents	H / A	Result F – A
18 October 2014	Asteras Tripoli	H	0–3
25 October 2014	OFI	A	1–3
8 November 2014	Atromitos	H	0–7
15 November 2014	Platanias	A	0–4
29 November 2014	Ergotelis	H	0–3
6 December 2014	Asteras Tripoli	A	0–4
21 December 2014	Olympiacos	H	0–9
23 December 2014	OFI	H	2–3
28 December 2014	Ergotelis	A	1–2
6 January 2015	Olympiacos	A	0–5
11 January 2015	Atromitos	A	1–6
18 January 2015	Platanias	H	2–4
26 January 2015	Panathinaikos	A	0–2
31 January 2015	Panathinaikos	H	3–5
8 February 2015	Atromitos	A	0–3
14 February 2015	Olympiacos	H	1–1
21 February 2015	Panathinaikos	A	0–3
1 March 2015	Asteras Tripoli	H	0–2
7 March 2015	Platanias	A	2–1
14 March 2015	OFI	A	2–0
21 March 2015	Ergotelis	H	0–3

Pos	Club	Pld	Pts
6	Platanias	21	17
7	OFI	21	10
8	AEL Kalloni	21	7

Pos = Position; Pld = Matches played; Pts = Points
