= 2013–14 AEL Kalloni F.C. season =

AEL Kalloni
2013–14 season
- Chairman: Nikos Michalakis
- Head coach: Giannis Matzourakis
- Stadium: Athens Olympic Stadium; Kleanthis Vikelidis Stadium; Nea Smyrni Stadium
- Super League Greece: 12th
- Greek Cup: Third round
- Top goalscorer: League: Leozinho (7); All: Leozinho (7)
- Highest home attendance: 10,177 (19 August vs Olympiacos, Super League Greece)
- Lowest home attendance: 66 (10 March vs Veria, Super League Greece)
- Average home league attendance: 1,059 (Super League Greece only)
Home colours	Away colours	Third colours

The 2013–14 season was AEL Kalloni's first season in the Super League Greece, the top flight of Greek football. They also participated in the Greek Cup.

== Club ==
=== Coaching staff ===
Position	Staff
Head coach	(Greece) Giannis Matzourakis
Assistant coach	(Greece) Thalis Theodoridis
Goalkeeping coach	(Greece) Panagiotis Nasis
Fitness coach	(Turkey) Mert İsbilir
Club doctor	(Greece) Dimitris Varvagiannis
Physiotherapist	(Greece) Thanos Karavasilis

Last updated: 12 September 2013
Source: AEL Kalloni F.C.

=== Kit ===
Supplier: Nike
Sponsor(s): Tzoker

Home	Home (alt)	Away	Third	Goalkeeper (1)	Goalkeeper (2)	Goalkeeper (3)	Goalkeeper (4)

Last updated: 28 October 2013.
Source: AEL Kalloni F.C.

=== Other information ===
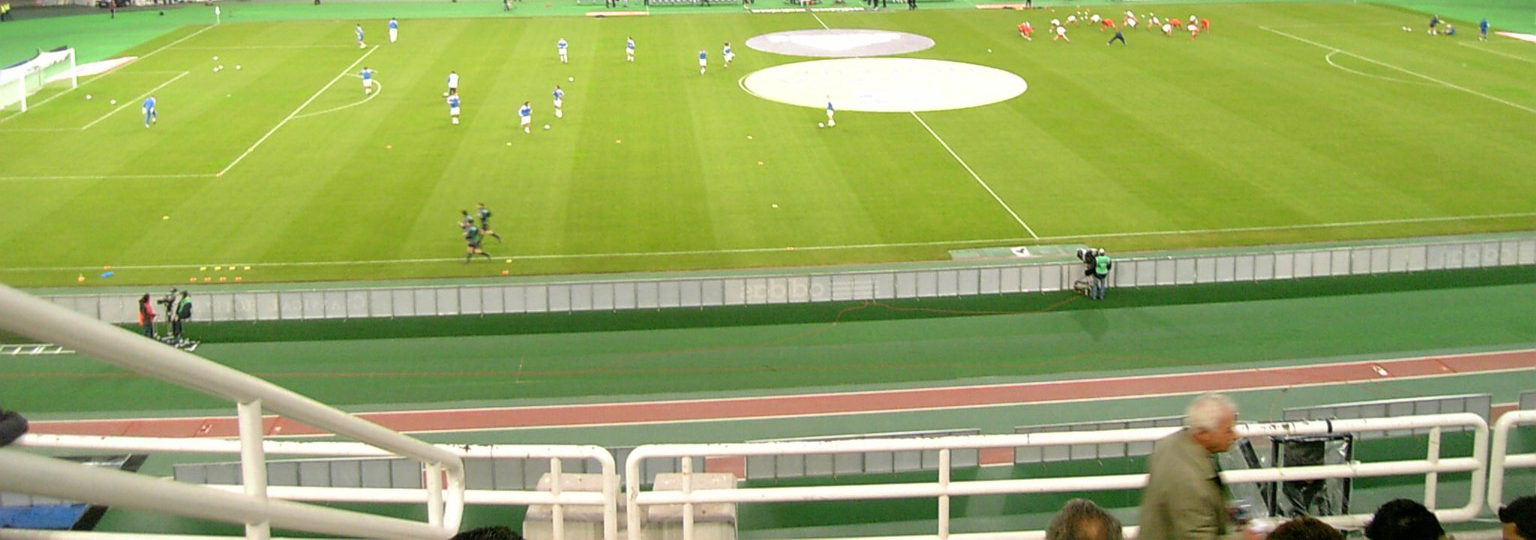
Because of the delay in completion of improvement works on Mytilene Municipal Stadium, AEL Kalloni had to play their home matches in neutral stadiums, mainly at Athens Olympic Stadium "Spyridon Louis".

Chairman	Nikos Michalakis
Ground (capacity and dimensions)	— (— / —)

Last updated: 27 July 2013
Source: AEL Kalloni F.C.

== Competitions ==
=== Overall ===
Competition	Started round	Current position / round	Final position / round	First match	Last match
Super League Greece	—	—	12th	19 August 2013	13 April 2014
Greek Cup	2nd round	—	3rd round	26 September 2013	16 January 2014

Last updated: 13 April 2014

=== Pre-season ===
The first phase of the preparation started on 1 July. From 17 to 29 July, the team went over to Pinzolo, Trentino, Italy, where the basic stadium of the preparation took place.

Date	Opponents	H / A	Result F – A	Scorers
21 July 2013	(Italy) Calciochiese	N	7 – 0	Gioukaris 24', Vlastellis 30', García 37', Leozinho (2) 51', 61', Anastasiadis 72', Muça
22 July 2013	(Italy) Genova ISS	N	4 – 0	Kazakis 36', Manousos 50' (pen.), Leozinho 68', Podaný
24 July 2013	(Italy) Genoa	N	0 – 0	
26 July 2013	(Italy) Livorno	N	0 – 2	
27 July 2013	(Italy) Bologna	N	1 – 0	Leozinho 30' (pen.)
3 August 2013	(Turkey) Manisaspor	A	1 – 0	Manousos 68'
4 August 2013	(Turkey) Akhisar Belediyespor	A	0 – 2	
10 August 2013	(Greece) PAOK	A	3 – 1	Manousos (2) 32', 36', Leozinho 48'

=== Super League Greece ===
==== League table ====
Pos	Team	Pld	W	D	L	GF	GA	GD	Pts
10	Panthrakikos	34	11	8	15	39	52	−13	41 (Note: Head-to-head points: Panthrakikos 4, PAS Giannina 1.)
11	PAS Giannina	34	12	5	17	34	43	−9	41
12	AEL Kalloni	34	12	3	19	31	62	−31	39 (Note: Head-to-head points: AEL Kalloni 4, Panionios 1.)
13	Panionios	34	10	9	15	33	42	−9	39
14	Platanias	34	10	8	16	39	48	−9	38 (Note: Head-to-head points: Platanias 8, Veria 5, Skoda Xanthi 3.)

Source: Super League Greece
Rules for classification: 1) Points; 2) Head-to-head points; 3) Head-to-head goal difference; 4) Goals scored; 5) Goals against; 6) Play-offs (neutral ground).
(Note: Criteria 6 is only used if needed to decide champion, teams for relegation or teams for UEFA competitions).
If in final league table there are still tied teams after applying criteria 1 to 5, a decision match (or matches if they are more than two) are to be played but only in three cases: to determine the champion, to fill spots in the play-off or to determine the teams to be relegated. In any other case, the final standings of tied teams are determined with a public draw.

==== Results summary ====
Overall								Home						Away					
Pld	W	D	L	GF	GA	GD	Pts	W	D	L	GF	GA	GD	W	D	L	GF	GA	GD
34	12	3	19	31	62	−31	39	8	2	7	18	25	−7	4	1	12	13	37	−24

Last updated: 13 April 2014.
Source: Superleague Greece

==== Results by round ====
Round	1	2	3	4	5	6	7	8	9	10	11	12	13	14	15	16	17	18	19	20	21	22	23	24	25	26	27	28	29	30	31	32	33	34
Ground	H	A	H	A	A	H	A	H	A	H	A	H	A	H	H	A	H	A	H	A	H	H	A	H	A	H	A	H	A	H	A	A	H	A
Result	L	W	W	W	L	L	L	L	L	W	W	W	L	L	L	L	D	L	W	W	D	L	L	W	L	W	D	L	L	W	L	L	W	L
Position	16	9	3	3	4	9	11	12	12	11	9	6	7	10	12	13	13	13	11	10	9	9	12	11	12	9	10	11	13	9	12	13	12	12

Source: Superleague Greece
A = Away; H = Home; W = Win; D = Draw; L = Loss

==== Matches ====
19 August 2013 1	AEL Kalloni	0–1	Olympiacos	Athens^{1}
21:30 (UTC+3)	Anastasiadis (yellow card) 5'; García (yellow card) 50'; Podaný (yellow card) 73'	Report	61' Maniatis; (yellow card) 79' Fejsa	Stadium: Athens Olympic Stadium "Spyridon Louis"^{1} Attendance: 10,177; Referee: Konstantinos Ioannidis (Argolis)

25 August 2013 2	Aris	0–2	AEL Kalloni	Thessaloniki
19:15 (UTC+3)	Dioudis (yellow card) 11'; Tsoumanis (yellow card) 41'; Udoji (yellow card) 80'	Report	11' Anastasiadis; (yellow card) 48' Faria; (yellow card) 80' Leandro; (yellow card) 82' Chorianopoulos; 90+3' García	Stadium: Kleanthis Vikelidis Stadium; Attendance: 7,926; Referee: Dimitris Thanos (Grevena)

31 August 2013 3	AEL Kalloni	1–0	PAS Giannina	Athens^{1}
19:15 (UTC+3)	Leozinho 53'; Chorianopoulos (yellow card) 90+3'	Report	(yellow card) 50' Ilić; (yellow card) 84' Kolovetsios	Stadium: Athens Olympic Stadium "Spyridon Louis"^{1} Attendance: 878; Referee: Stefanos Mantakis (Imathia)

15 September 2013 4	Apollon Smyrni	1–3	AEL Kalloni	Rizoupoli
18:15 (UTC+3)	Panteliadis (yellow card) 22'; Argyropoulos (yellow card) 65'; Alvarez (yellow card) 70'; Petropoulos 90' (pen.)	Report	(yellow card) 22' (goal) 53' Manousos; (yellow card) 51' Leozinho; 66' Leandro; (yellow card) 70' Anastasiadis; 76' M. Goianira; (yellow card) 89' Siligardakis	Stadium: Georgios Kamaras Stadium; Attendance: 1,879; Referee: Georgios Liachoudis (Macedonia)

21 September 2013 5	Asteras Tripoli	2–0	AEL Kalloni	Tripoli
16:00 (UTC+3)	Goian (yellow card) 27'; Pipinis (yellow card) 42'; De Blasis 69'; Carrasco 90+1'	Report	(yellow card) 14' (yellow-red card) 24' Anastasiadis; (yellow card) 42' Siderakis; (yellow card) 55' Chorianopoulos; (yellow card) 67' Juanlu	Stadium: Theodoros Kolokotronis Stadium; Attendance: 2,107; Referee: Michael Koukoulakis (Heraklion)

30 September 2013 6	AEL Kalloni	0–1	Atromitos	Athens^{1}
19:30 (UTC+3)	Leandro (yellow card) 10'; Siderakis (yellow card) 61'; Perrone (yellow card) 83'; Chorianopoulos (yellow card) 86'	Report	(yellow card) 25' Umbides; 62' (pen.) Papadopoulos; (yellow card) 67' Tavlaridis	Stadium: Athens Olympic Stadium^{1} Attendance: 608; Referee: Anastasios Kakos (Corfu)

6 October 2013 7	Levadiakos	1–0	AEL Kalloni	Livadeia
18:15 (UTC+3)	Mantzios 75'; Busto (yellow card) 81'; Martínez (yellow card) 90+2'	Report	(yellow card) 12' Anastasiadis; (red card) 60' Perrone; (yellow card) 67' Gašić	Stadium: Levadia Municipal Stadium; Attendance: 690; Referee: Alexandros Dimitropoulos (Phthiotis)

20 October 2013 8	AEL Kalloni	1–5	Skoda Xanthi	Thessaloniki^{1}
18:15 (UTC+3)	Kazakis (yellow card) 13'; Anastasiadis (yellow card) 34'; M. Goianira 41' (yellow card) 73'	Report	24', 45', 90+2' Solari; 33', 54' Soltani; (yellow card) 60' Suárez	Stadium: Kleanthis Vikelidis Stadium^{1} Attendance: 174; Referee: Athanasios Giachos (Chios)

28 October 2013 9	Panetolikos	4–0	AEL Kalloni	Agrinio
19:30 (UTC+2)	Bojović 15', 61' (yellow card) 57'; Godoy (yellow card) 16'; Camara 33'; Kousas (yellow card) 34'; M. Silva Júnior 37'; Bakakis (yellow card) 43'; Theodoridis (yellow card) 77'	Report	(yellow card) 36' (yellow-red card) 55' Podaný; (yellow card) 42' Faria	Stadium: Panetolikos Stadium; Attendance: 2,995; Referee: Ilias Spathas (Piraeus)

3 November 2013 10	AEL Kalloni	3–2	Panionios	Thessaloniki^{1}
15:00 (UTC+2)	M. Goianira 23'; Leozinho 75'; García 79'	Report	13' Giannou; 57' Aravidis; (yellow card) 60' Pantidos; (yellow card) 72' Mendrinos	Stadium: Kleanthis Vikelidis Stadium^{1} Attendance: 95; Referee: Marios Lambropoulos (Elis)

10 November 2013 11	Veria	0–3	AEL Kalloni	Veria
17:15 (UTC+2)	Bargan (yellow card) 45+1'; Georgiadis (yellow card) 60'; Zézinho (yellow card) 75'	Report	6' García; 27' Podaný; (yellow card) 32' Anastasiadis; (yellow card) 53' Manousos; (yellow card) 60' Faria; (yellow card) 68' Hogg; 79' Leozinho	Stadium: Veria Stadium; Attendance: 1,310; Referee: Anastasios Papapetrou (Athens)

24 November 2013 12	AEL Kalloni	1–0	Platanias	Athens^{1}
17:15 (UTC+2)	Kazakis (yellow card) 18' (goal) 65'; Manousos (yellow card) 45+1'	Report	(yellow card) 40' Tetteh	Stadium: Athens Olympic Stadium "Spyridon Louis"^{1} Attendance: 108; Referee: Stavros Tritsonis (Athens)

1 December 2013 13	OFI	3–1	AEL Kalloni	Heraklion
17:15 (UTC+2)	Papazoglou 40', 53' (yellow card) 54'; Zoro (yellow card) 66'; Makukula 88'	Report	(yellow card) 22' Hogg; 32' Leozinho; (yellow card) 37' García; (yellow card) 77' Galas; (yellow card) 83' Anastasiadis	Stadium: Theodoros Vardinogiannis Stadium; Attendance: 4,268; Referee: Konstantinos Ioannidis (Argolis)

8 December 2013 14	AEL Kalloni	0–4	Panathinaikos	Athens^{1}
19:30 (UTC+2)	M. Goianira (yellow card) 16' (yellow-red card) 83'; Leandro (yellow card) 27'	Report	(yellow card) 19' Zeca; 29', 67' Pranjić; 43' Berg; 90+2' Abeid	Stadium: Athens Olympic Stadium "Spyridon Louis"^{1} Attendance: 2,195; Referee: Anastasios Sidiropoulos (Dodecanese)

15 December 2013 15	AEL Kalloni	2–5	PAOK	Nea Smyrni^{1}
17:15 (UTC+2)	Perrone 6' (pen.); Chorianopoulos (yellow card) 31'; Gioukaris (yellow card) 86'; Manousos 87'	Report	(yellow card) 5' Glikos; 14' Oliseh; 29', 54' Salpingidis; 56' (o.g.) Anastasiadis; 59' Vukić	Stadium: Nea Smyrni Stadium^{1} Attendance: 1,586; Referee: Michael Koukoulakis (Heraklion)

18 December 2013 16	Panthrakikos	2–0	AEL Kalloni	Komotini
17:15 (UTC+2)	Papageorgiou (yellow card) 22'; Ladakis (yellow card) 44'; Cases 54'; Josse (yellow card) 66'; Christou 76'	Report	(yellow card) 14' Leandro; (yellow card) 53' (yellow-red card) 70' Faria; (yellow card) 55' Perrone	Stadium: Komotini Municipal Stadium; Attendance: 1,164; Referee: Dimitrios Styliaras (Aetolia-Acarnania)

22 December 2013 17	AEL Kalloni	0–0	Ergotelis	Athens^{1}
17:15 (UTC+2)	Chorianopoulos (yellow card) 40'; Leozinho (yellow card) 43'; Kazakis (yellow card) 86'	Report	(yellow card) 60' Diamantakos; (yellow card) 80' Badibanga; (yellow card) 90+3' Pitsos	Stadium: Athens Olympic Stadium "Spyridon Louis"^{1} Attendance: 100; Referee: Christos Mitsios (Epirus)

4 January 2014 18	Olympiacos	4–0	AEL Kalloni	Piraeus
19:30 (UTC+2)	Saviola 13'; Domínguez 54'; Manolas 65'; Machado 75'	Report	(yellow card) 40' M. Goianira	Stadium: Karaiskakis Stadium; Attendance: 15,152; Referee: Anastasios Papapetrou (Athens)

13 January 2014 19	AEL Kalloni	3–1	Aris	Athens^{1}
19:30 (UTC+2)	Zakuani 34'; Manousos 49'; M. Goianira (yellow card) 86'; Leozinho 87'	Report	(yellow card) 5' Iraklis; 14' Manias; (yellow card) 35' Tatos; (yellow card) 85' Pulido	Stadium: Athens Olympic Stadium "Spyridon Louis"^{1} Attendance: 413; Referee: Ioannis Kambaxis (Euboea)

19 January 2014 20	PAS Giannina	1–2	AEL Kalloni	Ioannina
17:15 (UTC+2)	Acosta 10' (yellow card) 63'; Kyvelidis (yellow card) 11'; Lila (yellow card) 24'; Tsoukalas (yellow card) 70'	Report	(yellow card) 32' Zakuani; (yellow card) 43' Keita; 67' Leozinho; (yellow card) 73' Podaný; 78' (yellow card) 80' Perrone; (yellow card) 86' Faria	Stadium: Zosimades Stadium; Attendance: 1,518; Referee: Charalambos Kalogeropoulos (Athens)

25 January 2014 21	AEL Kalloni	0–0	Apollon Smyrni	Athens^{1}
15:00 (UTC+2)	Anastasiadis (yellow card) 24'; Leozinho (yellow card) 56'	Report	(red card) 13' Delizisis; (yellow card) 37' Argyropoulos; (yellow card) 57' Mingas; (yellow card) 67' Farinola	Stadium: Athens Olympic Stadium "Spyridon Louis"^{1} Attendance: 517; Referee: Ilias Spathas (Piraeus)

2 February 2014 22	AEL Kalloni	0–2	Asteras Tripoli	Athens^{1}
17:15 (UTC+2)	Manousos (yellow card) 88'	Report	35' Juanma; (yellow card) 51' Sankaré; 72' Carrasco	Stadium: Athens Olympic Stadium "Spyridon Louis"^{1} Attendance: 122; Referee: Ioannis Topouzis (Thrace)

5 February 2014 23	Atromitos	2–0	AEL Kalloni	Peristeri
17:15 (UTC+2)	Iglesias (yellow card) 14' (goal) 43' (penalty missed) 72'; Nastos (yellow card) 18'; Karamanos 67'	Report	(yellow card) 28' Zakuani; (yellow card) 40' (yellow-red card) 40' Fourlanos	Stadium: Peristeri Stadium; Attendance: 953; Referee: Stefanos Mantakis (Imathia)

9 February 2014 24	AEL Kalloni	1–0	Levadiakos	Athens^{1}
17:15 (UTC+2)	Moulopoulos 13' (o.g.); Chorianopoulos (yellow card) 58'; Anastasiadis (yellow card) 90+1'	Report	(yellow card) 26' Koné; (yellow card) 60' Milosavljev; (yellow card) 90+5' Kapo	Stadium: Athens Olympic Stadium "Spyridon Louis"^{1} Attendance: 157; Referee: Anastasios Kakos (Corfu)

15 February 2014 25	Skoda Xanthi	1–0	AEL Kalloni	Xanthi
15:00 (UTC+2)	Vallas (yellow card) 79'; Goutas 89'	Report	(yellow card) 20' Kaltsas; (yellow card) 54' Zakuani; (yellow card) 84' Manousos	Stadium: Skoda Xanthi Arena; Attendance: 1,039; Referee: Georgios Kominis (Thesprotia)

24 February 2014 26	AEL Kalloni	3–1	Panetolikos	Athens^{1}
19:30 (UTC+2)	Keita 11'; Manousos 41'; Zakuani (yellow card) 44'; M. Goianira 52' (yellow card) 81'; García (yellow card) 62'	Report	76' Dalmat; (yellow card) 81' Godoy	Stadium: Athens Olympic Stadium "Spyridon Louis"^{1} Attendance: 509; Referee: Praxitelis Zachariadis (Macedonia)

2 March 2014 27	Panionios	1–1	AEL Kalloni	Nea Smyrni
17:15 (UTC+2)	Kolovos 54'	Report	(yellow card) 26' Leozinho; (yellow card) 41' Llorente; 70' Anastasiadis	Stadium: Nea Smyrni Stadium; Attendance: 711; Referee: Anastasios Papapetrou (Athens)

10 March 2014 28	AEL Kalloni	0–3	Veria	Athens^{1}
19:30 (UTC+2)	M. Goianira (yellow card) 43'; Keita (yellow card) 60'; Fourlanos (yellow card) 78'; Llorente (yellow card) 87'	Report	(yellow card) 14' (yellow-red card) 51' Sissoko; 43', 85' (pen.), 86' Nabouhane; (yellow card) 46' Kaltsas; (yellow card) 90+3' Barbas	Stadium: Athens Olympic Stadium "Spyridon Louis"^{1} Attendance: 66; Referee: Stavros Tritsonis (Athens)

16 March 2014 29	Platanias	7–0	AEL Kalloni	Mournies
17:15 (UTC+2)	Vlachodimos 36', 49', 85'; Anastasiadis 44' (o.g.); Dimitris (yellow card) 54'; Katai 62'; Inkoom (yellow card) 64'; Tetteh 69'; Goundoulakis 73'	Report	(yellow card) 23' M. Goianira; (yellow card) 24' Llorente; (penalty missed) 54' Perrone; (red card) 68' Josse	Stadium: Perivolia Municipal Stadium; Attendance: 1,492; Referee: Dimitrios Styliaras (Aetolia-Acarnania)

23 March 2014 30	AEL Kalloni	1–0	OFI	Athens^{1}
17:15 (UTC+2)	Faria (yellow card) 44'; Leozinho 69'; Perrone (yellow card) 79'; M. Goianira (yellow card) 90+3'	Report	(yellow card) 50' Dudu; (yellow card) 80' Bareiro	Stadium: Athens Olympic Stadium "Spyridon Louis"^{1} Attendance: 166; Referee: Alexandros Dimitropoulos (Phthiotis)

26 March 2014 31	Panathinaikos	3–0	AEL Kalloni	Athens
19:30 (UTC+2)	Dinas 14'; Karelis 44'; Vallios 71' (o.g.)	Report	(yellow card) 51' Vallios; (yellow card) 63' Chorianopoulos; (yellow card) 82' Faria; (yellow card) 85' Hogg; (yellow card) 89' Siligardakis	Stadium: Leoforos Alexandras Stadium; Attendance: 6,233; Referee: Stavros Tritsonis (Athens)

30 March 2014 32	PAOK	2–1	AEL Kalloni	Thessaloniki
15:00 (UTC+3)	Vukić 73'; Koulouris 84' (yellow card) 85'; Giakoumis (yellow card) 89'	Report	36' Perrone; (yellow card) 44' Chorianopoulos; (yellow card) 54' Fourlanos; (yellow card) 67' Keita	Stadium: Toumba Stadium; Attendance: 8,458; Referee: Ioannis Topouzis (Thrace)

6 April 2014 33	AEL Kalloni	2–0	Panthrakikos	Athens^{1}
19:00 (UTC+3)	Manousos 2'; M. Goianira 82'	Report		Stadium: Athens Olympic Stadium "Spyridon Louis"^{1} Attendance: 131; Referee: Anastasios Kakos (Corfu)

13 April 2014 34	Ergotelis	3–0	AEL Kalloni	Heraklion
19:00 (UTC+3)	Bouchalakis 29'; Kubík 37' (yellow card) 66'; Jovanović (yellow card) 48'; Monachello (yellow card) 51'; Diamantakos 64'	Report		Stadium: Pankritio Stadium; Attendance: 1,202; Referee: Michael Voskakis (Rethymno)

1.Because of the delay in completion of improvement works on Mytilene Municipal Stadium, they had to play their home matches in neutral stadiums.

=== Greek Cup ===
==== Second round ====
26 September 2013 First leg	Pierikos	1–2	AEL Kalloni	Katerini
15:30 (UTC+3)	Nikou (yellow card) 19'; Katharios (yellow card) 23' (goal) 32'; Manikas (yellow card) 63'	Report	24' Gašić; (yellow card) 35' Faria; (penalty missed) 64' 90+3' Perrone; (yellow card) 72' Galas	Stadium: Municipal Athletic Center II of Katerini; Attendance: n/a Referee: Alexandros Katsikogiannis (Epirus)

31 October 2013 Second leg	AEL Kalloni	2–2	Pierikos	Kalloni
14:30 (UTC+2)	Manousos 18' (pen.); Siligardakis (yellow card) 25'; Kazakis 42' (yellow card) 83'	Report	48', 68' Brito; (yellow card) 64' Itsios	Stadium: Kostas Kenteris Stadium; Attendance: n/a Referee: Andreas Pappas (Athens)

AEL Kalloni won 4–3 on aggregate.

==== Third round ====
4 December 2013 First leg	OFI	0–1	AEL Kalloni	Heraklion
17:30 (UTC+2)	Tripotseris (yellow card) 16'; Koutsianikoulis (yellow card) 45+1'; Verón (yellow card) 45+1'; Bourbos (yellow card) 82'	Report	(yellow card) 27' (yellow-red card) 42' Perrone; (yellow card) 76' Juanlu; 83' Kazakis	Stadium: Theodoros Vardinogiannis Stadium; Attendance: n/a Referee: Athanasios Giachos (Chios)

16 January 2014 Second leg	AEL Kalloni	0–2 (a.e.t.)	OFI	Athens^{1}
17:00 (UTC+2)	Fourlanos (yellow card) 39'; Gioukaris (yellow card) 45'; Faria (yellow card) 77'	Report	80' Perogamvrakis; 107' Papazoglou; (yellow card) 115' Milhazes	Stadium: Athens Olympic Stadium "Spyridon Louis"^{1} Attendance: n/a Referee: Stavros Tritsonis (Athens)

OFI won 2–1 on aggregate.

1.Because of the delay in completion of improvement works on Mytilene Municipal Stadium, they had to play their home matches in neutral stadiums.

== Players ==
=== Squad statistics ===
No.	Pos.	Name	League		Cup		Total		Discipline	
No.	Pos.	Name	Apps	Goals	Apps	Goals	Apps	Goals	Yellow card	Red card
1	GK	(Greece) Giannis Siderakis	19	0	2	0	21	0	2	0
4	MF	(Greece) Spyros Fourlanos	3(5)	0	1	0	4(5)	0	3	1
6	MF	(Greece) Michalis Kripintiris (c)	1	0	2	0	3	0	0	0
7	MF	(Greece) Nikos Galas	3(8)	0	3(1)	0	6(9)	0	2	0
9	FW	(Greece) Giorgos Manousos (c)	30	5	2	1	32	6	5	0
10	MF	(Brazil) Leozinho	30	7	0	0	30	7	4	0
11	MF	(Greece) Andreas Dambos	0(5)	0	0(1)	0	0(6)	0	0	0
12	MF	(Greece) Giorgos Chorianopoulos	28(2)	0	1	0	29(2)	0	9	0
13	FW	(Greece) Vlasis Kazakis	13(12)	1	2(1)	2	15(13)	3	4	0
14	DF	(Greece) Anestis Anastasiadis	28	4	2	0	30	4	8	1
15	DF	(Spain) Raúl Llorente	8(1)	0	0	0	8(1)	0	3	0
16	MF	(Spain) Jonan García	18(2)	3	1	0	19(2)	3	3	0
17	GK	(Malta) Andrew Hogg	14	0	2	0	16	0	3	0
19	MF	(Albania) Emilio Kishta	0	0	0	0	0	0	0	0
20	FW	(Argentina) Emanuel Perrone (c)	17(5)	3	2	1	19(5)	4	4	2
21	MF	(Greece) Dimitris Vlastellis	0(4)	0	2	0	2(4)	0	0	0
22	MF	(Greece) Charalambos Siligardakis	2(10)	0	2	0	4(10)	0	3	0
24	MF	(Senegal) Paul Keita	11(1)	1	1	0	12(1)	1	3	0
25	MF	(Brazil) Marcelo Goianira (c)	26(1)	5	1(1)	0	27(2)	5	7	1
26	MF	(Greece) Rafail Gioukaris	4(2)	0	2	0	6(2)	0	2	0
27	MF	(Greece) Nikos Kaltsas	7(6)	0	0	0	7(6)	0	1	0
28	FW	(Cyprus) Theodosis Kyprou	1	0	0	0	1	0	0	0
29	GK	(Greece) Lefteris Mappas	1	0	0	0	1	0	0	0
32	MF	(Portugal) Hugo Faria	19(5)	0	3	0	22(5)	0	8	1
33	MF	(Czech Republic) Jakub Podaný	34	1	0(1)	0	34(1)	1	2	1
47	FW	(France) Guy Gnabouyou	4(7)	0	1	0	5(7)	0	0	0
50	DF	(Democratic Republic of the Congo) Gabriel Zakuani	15	1	1	0	16	1	4	0
55	DF	(Greece) Stratis Vallios	6(4)	1	2(1)	0	8(5)	1	1	0
70	MF	(Greece) Zisis–Aggelos Naoum	1(1)	0	0	0	1(1)	0	0	0
87	DF	(France) Maxime Josse	2(2)	0	0	0	2(2)	0	0	1
94	DF	(Greece) Kyriakos Evaggelidakis	0	0	0(1)	0	0(1)	0	0	0
95	MF	(Greece) Aggelos Giazitzoglou	0(1)	0	0	0	0(1)	0	0	0
99	FW	(Greece) Anestis Agritis	1(1)	0	0(1)	0	1(2)	0	0	0
—	GK	(Greece) Petros Gomos	0	0	0	0	0	0	0	0
—	DF	(Serbia) Danijel Gašić	2(7)	0	2	1	4(7)	1	1	0
—	DF	(Greece) Iosif Lambropoulos	1	0	1	0	2	0	0	0
—	DF	(Brazil) Leandro	18(1)	1	2	0	20(1)	1	4	0
—	DF	(Greece) Konstantinos Lima	0(1)	0	1(1)	0	1(2)	0	0	0
—	MF	(Spain) Juanlu	6(1)	0	3	0	9(1)	0	2	0
—	MF	(Greece) Nikos Kalfas	0(1)	0	0	0	0(1)	0	0	0
—	MF	(Albania) Xhonatan Muça	0	0	0	0	0	0	0	0
—	FW	(Greece) Dimitris Bourous	0(1)	0	0	0	0(1)	0	0	0
—	FW	(Brazil) Marko dos Santos	1(2)	0	1(1)	0	2(3)	0	0	0
—	–	Own goals	–	3	–	0	–	3	–	–

Statistics accurate as of 13 April 2014.

=== Transfers ===
==== Summer ====
===== In =====
Date	Pos.	Name	From	Fee
22 June 2013	GK	(Malta) Andrew Hogg	Enosis Neon Paralimni	Unknown
22 June 2013	MF	(Portugal) Hugo Faria	Enosis Neon Paralimni	Unknown
3 July 2013	FW	(Argentina) Emanuel Perrone	Asteras Tripoli	Free
5 July 2013	FW	(Brazil) Marko dos Santos	Kavala	Free
11 July 2013	MF	(Spain) Jonan García	Deportivo Alavés	Unknown
9 August 2013	DF	(Serbia) Danijel Gašić	OFK Beograd	Unknown
14 August 2013	MF	(Greece) Nikos Kalfas	Ermionida Enosis	Free
23 August 2013	FW	(Greece) Anestis Agritis	Kerkyra	Free
28 August 2013	MF	(Spain) Juanlu	Levante	Unknown

===== Loaned in =====
Date	Pos.	Name	From	Duration
2 July 2013	DF	(Brazil) Leandro	Olympiacos	Ended
3 July 2013	MF	(Czech Republic) Jakub Podaný	Sparta Praha	End of season

===== Out =====
Date	Pos.	Name	To	Fee
1 June 2013	MF	(Spain) Toni González	Unattached (Released)	
1 June 2013	DF	(Spain) Nacho Neira	Barakaldo	Free
12 June 2013	FW	(Senegal) Macoumba Kandji	Levadiakos	Unknown
16 June 2013	FW	(Greece) Dimosthenis Manousakis	Niki Volos	Free
30 June 2013	DF	(Algeria) Walid Cherfa	Unattached (Released)	
30 June 2013	DF	(Greece) Ilias Kotsios	Unattached (Released)	
30 June 2013	FW	(Democratic Republic of the Congo) Patrick Dimbala	Unattached (Released)	
30 June 2013	FW	(Greece) Antonis Giondis	Fostiras	Free
30 June 2013	FW	(Spain) Mara	Unattached (Released)	
11 July 2013	MF	(Greece) Andreas Govas	Unattached (Released)	

==== Winter ====
===== In =====
Date	Pos.	Name	From	Fee
13 December 2013	FW	(France) Guy Gnabouyou	Inter Turku	Unknown
30 December 2013	MF	(Senegal) Paul Keita	PAS Giannina	Free
2 January 2014	DF	(Democratic Republic of the Congo) Gabriel Zakuani	Peterborough United	Unknown
17 January 2014	MF	(Greece) Nikos Kaltsas	Panionios	Free
21 January 2014	DF	(Spain) Raúl Llorente	CD Tenerife	Free
28 January 2014	MF	(Greece) Zisis–Aggelos Naoum	Aris	Free
30 January 2014	FW	(Cyprus) Theodosis Kyprou	Chalkanoras Idaliou	Free
30 January 2014	DF	(Greece) Aggelos Giazitzoglou	AEL Kalloni U20	—
31 January 2014	DF	(France) Maxime Josse	Panthrakikos	Free

===== Loaned in =====
Date	Pos.	Name	From	Duration
31 December 2013	MF	(Greece) Spyros Fourlanos	Club Brugge	End of season

===== Out =====
Date	Pos.	Name	To	Fee
10 October 2013	GK	(Greece) Petros Gomos	Aiolikos	Free
19 December 2013	DF	(Greece) Iosif Lambropoulos	Paniliakos	Free
19 December 2013	DF	(Greece) Konstantinos Lima	Pannaxiakos	Free
27 December 2013	DF	(Serbia) Danijel Gašić	Sloga Kraljevo	Free
9 January 2014	FW	(Brazil) Marko dos Santos	Acharnaikos	Free
10 January 2014	MF	(Spain) Juanlu	Córdoba	Free

===== Loaned out =====
Date	Pos.	Name	To	Duration
24 January 2014	MF	(Albania) Xhonatan Muça	Vataniakos	End of season
1 February 2014	MF	(Greece) Nikos Kalfas	Kymi	End of season
1 February 2014	FW	(Greece) Dimitris Bourous	Kymi	End of season

== Infrastructure leagues ==
=== U20 ===
Date	Opponents	H / A	Result F – A	Scorers
24 August 2013	Aris	A	1–2	
2 September 2013	PAS Giannina	H	3–0	
15 September 2013	Apollon Smyrni	A	1–0	
22 September 2013	Asteras Tripoli	A	0–3	
29 September 2013	Atromitos	H	1–4	
6 October 2013	Levadiakos	A	1–2	
13 October 2013	Olympiacos	H	2–0	
20 October 2013	Skoda Xanthi	H	2–2	
27 October 2013	Panetolikos	A	1–0	
2 November 2013	Panionios	H	3–0	
10 November 2013	Veria	A	2–1	
23 November 2013	Platanias	H	4–0	
1 December 2013	OFI	A	3–1	
7 December 2013	Panathinaikos	H	2–2	
14 December 2013	PAOK	H	1–2	
22 December 2013	Ergotelis	H	4–2	
5 January 2014	Olympiacos	A	0–3	
11 January 2014	Aris	H	1–1	
19 January 2014	PAS Giannina	A	0–0	
26 January 2014	Apollon Smyrni	H	1–1	
1 February 2014	Asteras Tripoli	H	2–2	
8 February 2014	Levadiakos	H	1–1	
16 February 2014	Skoda Xanthi	A	0–1	
22 February 2014	Panetolikos	H	1–4	
8 March 2014	Veria	H	3–1	
15 March 2014	Platanias	A	0–2	
22 March 2014	OFI	H	1–0	
30 March 2014	PAOK	A	1–1	
6 April 2014	Panthrakikos	H	1–0	
13 April 2014	Ergotelis	A	1–4	
30 April 2014	Panionios	A	1–3	
4 May 2014	Atromitos	A	1–2	
11 May 2014	Panathinaikos	A	0–5	
17 May 2014	Panthrakikos	A	2–3	

Pos	Club	Pld	Pts
10	Panetolikos	34	44
11	AEL Kalloni	34	44
12	Veria	34	35

Pos = Position; Pld = Matches played; Pts = Points

=== U17 ===
==== First round ====
Date	Opponents	H / A	Result F – A	Scorers
15 September 2013	Platanias	A	1–1	
21 September 2013	Ergotelis	H	0–3	
29 September 2013	Levadiakos	A	0–2	
6 October 2013	Atromitos	H	1–5	
13 October 2013	Panionios	A	0–1	
27 October 2013	Asteras Tripoli	H	1–0	
3 November 2013	OFI	A	1–1	
10 November 2013	Apollon Smyrni	H	2–1	
17 November 2013	Panathinaikos	A	0–4	
24 November 2013	Olympiacos	H	1–3	
1 December 2013	Platanias	H	2–1	
8 December 2013	Ergotelis	A	1–1	
14 December 2013	Levadiakos	H	2–3	
22 December 2013	Atromitos	A	0–3	
12 January 2014	Panionios	H	0–4	
26 January 2014	Asteras Tripoli	A	1–0	
2 February 2014	OFI	H	4–2	
9 February 2014	Apollon Smyrni	A	0–2	
15 February 2014	Panathinaikos	H	1–6	
22 February 2014	Olympiacos	A	0–7	

Pos	Club	Pld	Pts
8	Asteras Tripoli	20	20
9	AEL Kalloni	20	18
10	Apollon Smyrni	20	14

Pos = Position; Pld = Matches played; Pts = Points

==== Second round ====
Date	Opponents	H / A	Result F – A	Scorers
9 March 2014	Apollon Smyrni	H	1–2	
16 March 2014	OFI	A	0–3	
23 March 2014	Asteras Tripoli	A	0–2	
30 March 2014	Asteras Tripoli	H	1–2	
6 April 2014	Apollon Smyrni	A	0–0	
24 April 2014	OFI	H	2–1	

Pos	Club	Pld	Pts
8	Asteras Tripoli	6	29
9	Apollon Smyrni	6	25
10	AEL Kalloni	6	22
11	OFI	6	22

Pos = Position; Pld = Matches played; Pts = Points
