= Eleftherios Venizelos, Crete =

Eleftherios Venizelos Ελευθέριος Βενιζέλος
- Municipal unit
- Location within the regional unit

- Location within Greece
- Coordinates: 35°29′N 24°02′E
- Country: Greece
- Administrative region: Crete
- Regional unit: Chania
- Municipality: Chania

Area
  - Municipal unit: 18.8 km^{2} (7.3 sq mi)

Population (2021)
  - Municipal unit: 13,018
  - Municipal unit density: 692/km^{2} (1,790/sq mi)
- Time zone: UTC+2 (EET)
  - Summer (DST): UTC+3 (EEST)
- Vehicle registration: ΧΝ

Eleftherios Venizelos (Greek: Ελευθέριος Βενιζέλος) is a former municipality in the Chania regional unit, Crete, Greece. Since the 2011 local government reform it is part of the municipality Chania, of which it is a municipal unit. The municipal unit has an area of 18.806 km^{2} (7.261 sq mi). It is centred on the town of Mournies, due south of the city of Chania. The municipality was named for the Greek statesman Eleftherios Venizelos, who was born in Mournies. Other settlements include the villages of Pasakaki, Nerokouros, Vandes and Agios Georgios. As of 2021, the population of the municipal unit was 13,018.
