= Nerokouros =

Nerokouros Νεροκούρος
- Community
- Location within Greece
- Coordinates: 35°28′33″N 24°02′18″E
- Country: Greece
- Administrative region: Crete
- Regional unit: Chania
- Municipality: Chania
- Municipal unit: Eleftherios Venizelos

Population (2021)
  - Community: 5,593
- Time zone: UTC+2 (EET)
  - Summer (DST): UTC+3 (EEST)

Nerokouros (Greek: Νεροκούρος) is a village in Crete, in the regional unit of Chania.
