= Gabriel Zakuani =

Congolese footballer (born 1986)

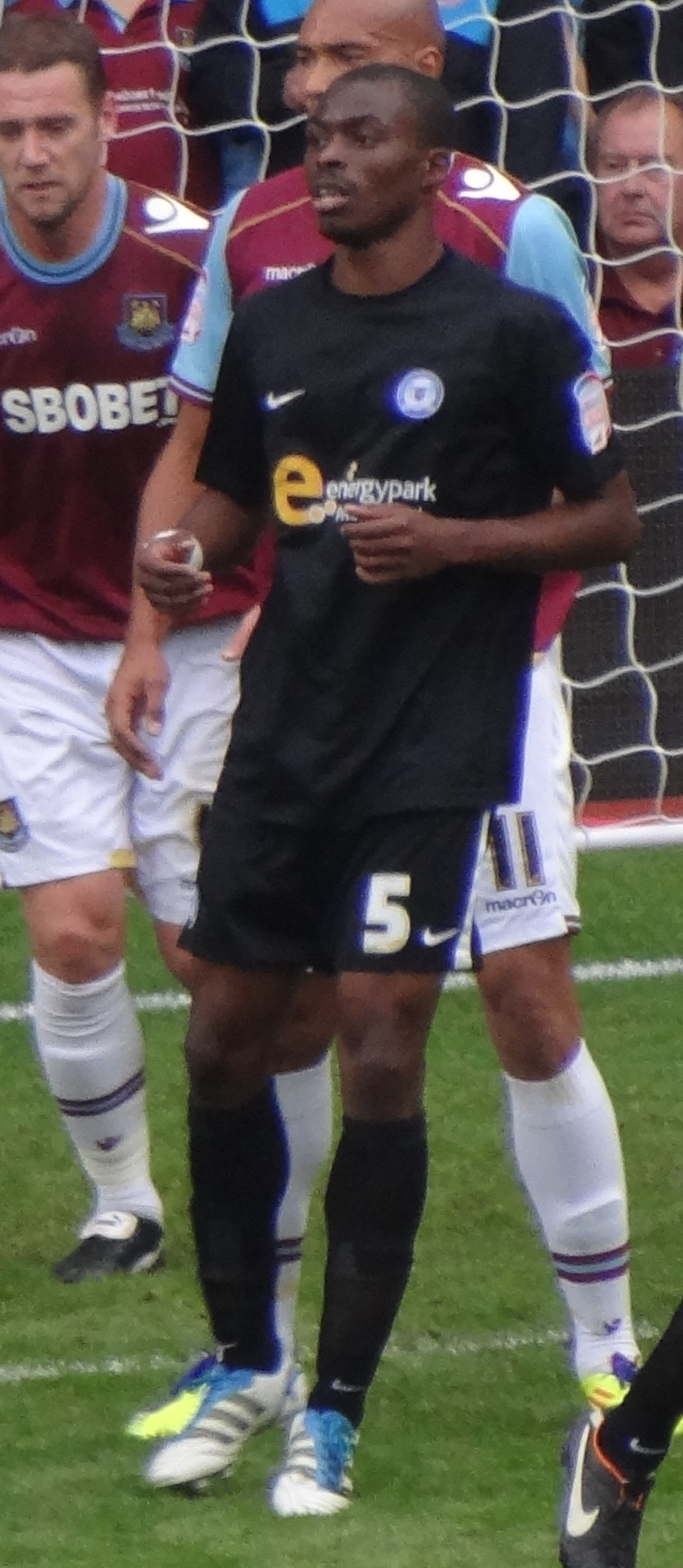
- Zakuani playing for Peterborough United in 2011

Personal information
- Full name: Gabriel Abdala Zakuani
- Date of birth: 31 May 1986 (age 40)
- Place of birth: Kinshasa, Zaire
- Height: 1.86 m (6 ft 1 in)
- Position: Defender

Youth career
- 2000–2003: Leyton Orient

Senior career*
Years	Team	Apps	(Gls)
2003–2006	Leyton Orient	87	(3)
2006–2009	Fulham	0	(0)
2007	→ Stoke City (loan)	9	(0)
2007–2008	→ Stoke City (loan)	19	(0)
2008–2009	→ Peterborough United (loan)	32	(1)
2009–2014	Peterborough United	148	(4)
2014	AEL Kalloni	15	(1)
2014–2016	Peterborough United	46	(4)
2016–2017	Northampton Town	21	(2)
2017–2019	Gillingham	69	(0)
2019–2020	Swindon Town	6	(0)
2020	Dagenham & Redbridge	1	(0)
Total		483	(15)

International career
2013–2017	DR Congo	29	(0)

Managerial career
- 2020–2021: Spalding United
- * Club domestic league appearances and goals

Gabriel Abdala Zakuani (born 31 May 1986) is a Congolese retired professional footballer who played as a defender. He is now a broadcaster and assistant manager of the DR Congo under-20 team.

Zakuani began his career with Leyton Orient, and was a vital member of the side which gained promotion in 2005–06 and also knocked Premier League side Fulham out of the FA Cup. He was signed by Fulham in August 2006, but failed to make an impact at Craven Cottage, spending half the 2006–07 season and the whole of the 2007–08 season on loan at Stoke City, with whom he helped gain promotion to the Premier League.

He signed for Peterborough United in 2008–09, initially on loan, before making the move permanent. With the "Posh" Zakuani gained promotion in 2008–09 but were then relegated in 2009–10. They gained an instant return by beating Huddersfield Town 3–0 in the 2011 League One play-off final. After spending two seasons in the Championship, Peterborough suffered relegation at the end of the 2012–13 season. In January 2014, Zakuani decided to join Super league Greece side AEL Kalloni. He returned, however, to Peterborough in June 2014.

== Club career ==
=== Leyton Orient ===
Born in Kinshasa, Zakuani moved to London as a young child. Leyton Orient spotted him playing in one of his school matches as a 14-year old and signed him. After two seasons in Orient's youth team, Zakuani was given his first-team debut against AFC Bournemouth in March 2003, aged 16. In the 2004–05 and 2005–06 seasons, he became a regular in Martin Ling's plans, making the central defence position his own and scoring three goals in almost 100 first team appearances for Orient.

In January 2006, Zakuani was part of the Leyton Orient side that defeated Premier League, Fulham 2–1 in the FA Cup third round. His performance attracted the attention of the West London side, who signed him in July that year for a fee of £1 million, rising to £1.5 million depending on appearances, on a four-year contract. The fee represented a club record for Leyton Orient.

=== Fulham ===
Zakuani only played twice for Fulham in his three-year spell with the club, in the League Cup against Wycombe Wanderers and in the FA Cup against Leicester City.

==== Loans to Stoke City ====
Zakuani signed for Stoke City on loan for the remainder of the 2006–07 season. Despite being a centre back, Zakuani also deputised as a right-back during his loan spell. He made his debut for Stoke in a 2–0 win away at Derby County in February 2007. He went on to make another eight appearances for Stoke during the 2006–07 season as City narrowly missed out on a play-off place.

On 31 August 2007, Zakuani re-signed for Stoke on loan for the rest of the 2007–08 season. This time he made 19 appearances as Stoke were promoted to the Premier League. Zakuani later admitted he would like to make a permanent move to Stoke: "The gaffer [Tony Pulis] said he'd like me here so I'll wait and see what happens in the summer. Obviously Stoke would be my first choice but you always think where you will be wanted the most." Despite this, a move never happened.

=== Peterborough United ===
Gabriel Zakuani was then sent to Peterborough United on a three-month loan. On 25 November 2008, it was confirmed that he would make his loan move permanent when the transfer window re-opened on 1 January 2009, for a fee in the region of £375,000.

On 8 July 2012, Zakuani was given captaincy of Peterborough United, where he would succeed Grant McCann. On 12 November 2012, he was transfer listed and fined following a breach of club discipline following a night out in Peterborough. Zakuani wrote on Twitter, explaining: "I went out on a weekend whether there's no midweek game, those that know me know I don't drink or smoke, I was up at 8am for church the next day." He was later taken off the transfer list and had his fine repealed. As a result of not being transfer list, Zakuani was available for the next match. Zakuani says the incident changed his attitude, and he vowed to stay behind more in training.

At the end of the 2012–13 season, which resulted in Peterborough United relegation, Zakuani was placed on the transfer list for the second time after rejecting a three-year contract with the club, due to his increasing international commitment.

=== AEL Kalloni ===
On 2 January 2014, Zakuani signed a contract with AEL Kalloni, who are competing in Super league Greece, the top flight of Greek football.

=== Return to Peterborough United ===
On 8 June 2014, Zakuani made a return to Peterborough, signing a two-year contract stating: "I missed the club and this feels like a homecoming. I feel like there is unfinished business here. I want to get this club back to the Championship."

=== Northampton Town ===
Zakuani signed for Northampton Town in June 2016. He scored his first goal for Northampton in a 4–2 win at Shrewsbury Town on 22 October 2016.

=== Gillingham ===
Zakuani signed for League One side Gillingham on a one-year deal on 7 June 2017, after rejecting a new contract offer from Northampton Town. He made his full debut in the 0–0 draw away to Doncaster Rovers on the opening day of the 2017–18 League One season.

He was offered a new contract by Gillingham at the end of the 2017–18 season. He left the club in September 2019 when his contract was terminated. At the time he had not played a game for seven months due to injury.

=== Swindon Town ===
On 4 October 2019, Zakuani signed a short-term contract with Swindon Town following a long-term injury to club captain Dion Conroy. He made his first appearance the following day in a 2–1 defeat at Bradford City. Zakuani was released in January 2020 after his short-term deal expired.

=== Dagenham & Redbridge ===
On 13 January 2020, Zakuani signed for National League club Dagenham & Redbridge on a six-month deal. He made one appearance for the Daggers before the season was cut short due to COVID-19 and subsequently retired from the game in September 2020.

== International career ==
Zakuani retired from international duty in September 2018, having made 29 appearances since making his debut in 2013.

== Coaching career ==
In October 2020 Zakuani was appointed joint caretaker manager of Spalding United alongside Neal Spafford and was later given the job on a permanent basis with Spafford as his assistant and Lomana LuaLua to be brought in as an attacking coach.

In November 2021 he stepped down from the role due to his increased business and media commitments.

== Personal life ==
His brother Steve is a former professional footballer who came through the Arsenal academy, before playing collegiate soccer with the Akron Zips and for the Cleveland Internationals of the USL Premier Development League. He then graduated to Major League Soccer and played for Seattle Sounders FC and Portland Timbers before retiring, citing injuries. In 2007, Zakuani appeared in Dizzee Rascal's music video for his single "Flex".

== Career statistics ==
=== Club ===
Appearances and goals by club, season and competition
Club	Season	League			National Cup		League Cup		Other		Total	
Club	Season	Division	Apps	Goals	Apps	Goals	Apps	Goals	Apps	Goals	Apps	Goals
Leyton Orient	2002–03	Third Division	1	0	0	0	0	0	0	0	1	0
Leyton Orient	2003–04	Third Division	10	2	1	0	0	0	0	0	11	2
Leyton Orient	2004–05	League Two	33	0	1	0	1	0	1 (Note: Appearances in the Football League Trophy)	0	36	0
Leyton Orient	2005–06	League Two	43	1	5	0	1	0	1	0	50	1
Leyton Orient	Total		87	3	7	0	2	0	2	0	98	3
Fulham	2006–07	Premier League	0	0	1	0	1	0	—		2	0
Stoke City (loan)	2006–07	Championship	9	0	—		—		—		9	0
Stoke City (loan)	2007–08	Championship	19	0	1	0	0	0	—		20	0
Stoke City (loan)	Total		28	0	1	0	0	0	0	0	29	0
Peterborough United	2008–09	League One	32	1	5	0	0	0	0	0	37	1
Peterborough United	2009–10	Championship	29	0	0	0	3	0	—		32	0
Peterborough United	2010–11	League One	30	2	3	0	1	0	4 (Note: One appearance in the Football League Trophy and two in the League One play-offs)	0	38	2
Peterborough United	2011–12	Championship	41	1	1	0	1	0	—		43	1
Peterborough United	2012–13	Championship	33	1	0	0	1	0	—		34	1
Peterborough United	2013–14	League One	15	0	0	0	2	1	1	0	18	1
Peterborough United	Total		180	5	9	0	8	1	5	0	202	6
AEL Kalloni	2013–14	Super league Greece	15	1	1	0	—		—		16	1
Peterborough United	2014–15	League One	22	1	1	0	0	0	0	0	23	1
Peterborough United	2015–16	League One	24	3	2	0	1	0	0	0	27	3
Peterborough United	Total		46	4	3	0	1	0	0	0	50	4
Northampton Town	2016–17	League One	21	2	2	0	2	0	0	0	25	2
Gillingham	2017–18	League One	40	0	2	0	0	0	0	0	42	0
Gillingham	2018–19	League One	29	0	5	0	0	0	0	0	34	0
Gillingham	Total		69	0	7	0	0	0	0	0	76	0
Swindon Town	2019–20	League Two	6	0	0	0	0	0	2	0	8	0
Dagenham & Redbridge	2019–20	National League	1	0	—		—		—		1	0
Career total			453	15	31	0	14	1	9	0	507	16

=== International ===
Appearances and goals by national team and year
National team	Year	Apps	Goals
DR Congo	2013	5	0
DR Congo	2014	2	0
DR Congo	2015	11	0
DR Congo	2016	8	0
DR Congo	2017	3	0
Total		29	0

== Honours ==
Leyton Orient

- Football League Two third-place promotion: 2005–06

Stoke City

- Football League Championship second-place promotion: 2007–08

Peterborough United

- Football League One second-place promotion: 2008–09
- Football League One play-offs: 2011
