= Marcos Barrera =

Argentine footballer

Personal information
- Full name: Marcos Israel Barrera Tabilo
- Date of birth: 2 March 1984 (age 42)
- Place of birth: Mendoza, Argentina
- Height: 1.84 m (6 ft 0 in)
- Position: Centre back

Team information
- Current team: Huracán Las Heras

Senior career*
Years	Team	Apps	(Gls)
2006–2008	Godoy Cruz	5	(0)
2008–2009	Club 2 de Mayo	10	(0)
2009–2010	Jorge Wilstermann	20	(0)
2010–2011	Deportes Iquique	1	(0)
2011–2012	Universitario de Sucre	37	(5)
2012–2014	The Strongest	68	(8)
2014–2015	AEL Kalloni	8	(0)
2015	Deportivo Municipal	28	(0)
2016	Huracán Las Heras	30	(0)
2017–2019	San José	112	(11)
2020	Always Ready	16	(1)
2021–	Huracán Las Heras	2	(0)
- * Club domestic league appearances and goals as of 16:44, 30 May 2021 (UTC)

Marcos Barrera (born 2 March 1984) is an Argentine footballer playing as a centre back for Huracán Las Heras.
