= Ximo Navarro (footballer, born 1988) =

Spanish footballer

Personal information
- Full name: Joaquín Navarro Armero
- Date of birth: 12 September 1988 (age 38)
- Place of birth: Valencia, Spain
- Height: 1.71 m (5 ft 7 in)
- Positions: Right-back; midfielder

Youth career
- 2004: Benimar
- 2005–2007: Valencia

Senior career*
Years	Team	Apps	(Gls)
2007–2011	Valencia B	54	(3)
2008–2010	Valencia	0	(0)
2009–2010	→ Elche (loan)	18	(0)
2011–2014	Asteras Tripolis	77	(10)
2014–2015	Kalloni	23	(0)
2015	Levadiakos	11	(0)
2016	Trikala	17	(3)
2016–2018	AEL	15	(0)
2018–2019	Torre Levante	30	(1)
2019	Saguntino	7	(0)
2019–2022	Acero	65	(1)
Total		317	(18)
- * Club domestic league appearances and goals

Joaquín 'Ximo' Navarro Armero (Valencian pronunciation: [ˈtʃimo naˈvaro]; born 12 September 1988) is a Spanish former professional footballer who played as a right-back or right midfielder.

== Club career ==
Born in Valencia, Navarro joined hometown Valencia CF's youth ranks in early 2005, then spent the following years with the reserves, helping them return to the Segunda División B in his first season. He started his career as a right-back.

Navarro made his first-team debut in late 2008, appearing in both legs against lowly Club Portugalete in the Copa del Rey's round of 32, a 7–1 aggregate win. For the 2009–10 campaign, he was loaned by coach Unai Emery to neighbouring Elche CF in the Segunda División.

After leaving the Mestalla Stadium on 30 June 2011, Navarro resumed his career in the Super League Greece, where he represented a host of clubs. On 4 January 2018, Athlitiki Enosi Larissa F.C. released the 29-year-old.
