= Leandro Pinto =

Brazilian footballer (born 1994)

Personal information
- Full name: Leandro Climaco Pinto
- Date of birth: 24 January 1994 (age 32)
- Place of birth: São Paulo, Brazil
- Height: 1.82 m (5 ft 11 1/2 in)
- Position: Centre back

Youth career
- 2007–2011: Olympiacos

Senior career*
Years	Team	Apps	(Gls)
2011–2015	Olympiacos	0	(0)
2011–2012	→ Doxa Drama (loan)	14	(0)
2013–2014	→ Kalloni (loan)	19	(1)
2014	→ PAS Giannina (loan)	2	(0)
2014–2015	→ Lamia (loan)	21	(0)
2015–2016	Lamia	19	(2)
2016–2017	Trikala	28	(2)
2017	Doxa Katokopias	11	(0)
2018	Trikala	8	(0)
2018	Olympiacos Volos	0	(0)
2019–2021	Proleter Novi Sad	67	(4)
2021–2022	TSC	15	(1)
2022	Radnik Surdulica	6	(0)
2023	Novi Sad 1921	15	(0)
2023	Kolubara	14	(0)
2024–2025	Javor Ivanjica	47	(0)
2026	Borac 1926	9	(0)
- * Club domestic league appearances and goals as of 14 June 2026

Leandro Climaco Pinto (born 24 January 1994) is a Brazilian professional footballer who plays as a centre back.

== Career ==
He started his professional career at Olympiacos. He spent the first season on loan to Doxa Drama, where he made 15 appearances. After consecutive loans to Kalloni, PAS Giannina, and Lamia he left Olympiacos as a free agent. On 9 September 2015 he joined Lamia. Despite his good performances he left the club in July 2016. Despite being linked with AEL he chose to join Trikala. On 22 December 2016 he scored his first goal in a 3–0 home win against Panthrakikos. He was good throughout the season but his team failed to win promotion to the Superleague. After a short spell with Doxa Katokopias, he returned to Trikala on 4 January 2018. At the end of the season, he was brought by same level side Olympiacos Volos, but got no chances to play, so in the following winter-break he was up to something new and different, he left Greece, and signed with newly promoted Serbian SuperLiga side Proleter Novi Sad where he grabbed a place as center-back and made 14 appearances already in his opening half-season in Serbia.
