= Ljubomir Stevanović =

Serbian footballer (born 1986)

Personal information
- Date of birth: 8 August 1986 (age 40)
- Place of birth: Zrenjanin, SFR Yugoslavia
- Height: 1.72 m (5 ft 8 in)
- Position: Midfielder

Senior career*
Years	Team	Apps	(Gls)
2003–2007	Mladost Apatin	64	(2)
2004	→ Proleter Zrenjanin (loan)	11	(0)
2007–2008	Vojvodina	0	(0)
2008	→ Banat Zrenjanin (loan)	11	(0)
2008–2011	Banat Zrenjanin	64	(10)
2011–2014	Metalurg Skopje	93	(14)
2014–2015	AEL Kalloni	13	(0)
2015–2017	Trikala	59	(5)
2017–2018	Aris	0	(0)
2018	Doxa Drama	6	(0)
2018	Rabotnički	13	(0)
2019–2020	Olympiacos Volos	9	(0)
2020–2021	Železničar Pančevo	11	(0)
2021–2022	OFK Kikinda		
2022–2024	Radnički Zrenjanin		
2024–2026	Naftagas Elemir		

International career
2004–2005	Serbia and Montenegro U19	6	(0)
2006	Serbia U21	1	(0)
- * Club domestic league appearances and goals as of 19 May 2021

Ljubomir Stevanović (Serbian Cyrillic: Љубомир Стевановић; born 8 August 1986) is a Serbian professional footballer who plays as an attacking midfielder.

== Club career ==
In his homeland, Stevanović played for Mladost Apatin, Proleter Zrenjanin, Vojvodina and Banat Zrenjanin. He was transferred to Macedonian club Metalurg Skopje in the summer of 2011. Stevanović spent the following three seasons with the club, making over 100 competitive appearances.

In June 2014, Stevanović signed a one-year contract with AEL Kalloni.

On 26 August 2015 he signed a contract with Trikala.

On 14 July 2021, he signed with OFK Kikinda.

== International career ==
Stevanović represented Serbia and Montenegro at the 2005 UEFA European Under-19 Championship. He made one appearance for the Serbian national under-21 team, coming on as a substitute in a friendly game against Portugal U21 on 14 November 2006.
