= Daniel Adejo =

Nigerian footballer (born 1989)

Personal information
- Full name: Daniel Adejo
- Date of birth: 7 August 1989 (age 37)
- Place of birth: Kachia, Nigeria
- Height: 1.85 m (6 ft 1 in)
- Position: Centre-back

Team information
- Current team: Reggina
- Number: 2

Youth career
- 2005–2007: Este
- 2007–2008: Reggina

Senior career*
Years	Team	Apps	(Gls)
2005–2006	Este	25	(2)
2008–2014	Reggina	161	(3)
2014–2016	Kalloni	42	(3)
2016–2017	Vicenza	48	(0)
2017	Salernitana	0	(0)
2018	Kerkyra	11	(0)
2018–2023	Lamia	150	(7)
2024–	Reggina	38	(1)
- * Club domestic league appearances and goals as of 8 march 2023

Daniel Adejo (born 7 August 1989) is a Nigerian professional footballer who plays as a defender for Italian Serie D club Reggina.

== Early life ==
Daniel Adejo was born on 7 August 1989 in Kachia, Kaduna State, Nigeria. He is right footed.

== Career ==
Adejo made his Serie A debut on 1 March 2009 in a match against Fiorentina.

On 17 June 2014 Adejo signed a two-year deal with AEL Kalloni. He was released after a season and went on trial with St Johnstone in Scotland, before cutting the trial short after interest from Serie B side Vicenza.

== Career statistics ==
=== Club ===
As of 29 January 2022

Club	Season	League			Cup		Continental		Other		Total	
Club	Season	Division	Apps	Goals	Apps	Goals	Apps	Goals	Apps	Goals	Apps	Goals
Reggina	2008–09	Serie A	8	0	1	0	—		—		9	0
Reggina	2009–10	Serie B	26	0	2	0	—		—		28	0
Reggina	2010–11	Serie B	38	0	1	0	—		—		39	0
Reggina	2011–12	Serie B	18	0	2	0	—		—		20	0
Reggina	2012–13	Serie B	39	2	2	0	—		—		41	2
Reggina	2013–14	Serie B	32	1	3	0	—		—		35	1
Reggina	Total		161	3	11	0	—		—		172	3
Kalloni	2014–15	Super League Greece	31	2	2	0	—		—		33	2
Kalloni	2015–16	Super League Greece	11	1	1	0	—		—		12	1
Kalloni	Total		42	3	3	0	—		—		45	3
Vicenza	2015–16	Serie B	12	0	—		—		—		12	0
Vicenza	2016–17	Serie B	36	0	0	0	—		—		36	0
Vicenza	Total		48	0	0	0	—		—		48	3
Salernitana	2017–18	Serie B	0	0	0	0	—		—		0	0
Kerkyra	2017–18	Super League Greece	11	0	—		—		—		11	0
Lamia	2018–19	Super League Greece	30	3	6	0	—		—		36	3
Lamia	2019–20	Super League Greece	31	1	1	1	—		—		32	2
Lamia	2020–21	Super League Greece	31	1	1	1	—		—		32	2
Lamia	2021–22	Super League Greece	27	0	3	0	—		—		30	0
Lamia	2022–23	Super League Greece	16	0	4	0	—		—		20	
Lamia	Total		135	5	15	2	0	0	0	0	150	7
Career total			397	11	29	2	0	0	0	0	425	13
