= Branimir Aleksić =

Serbian footballer (born 1990)

Personal information
- Date of birth: 24 December 1990 (age 35)
- Place of birth: Subotica, SR Serbia, SFR Yugoslavia
- Height: 1.97 m (6 ft 6 in)
- Position: Goalkeeper

Team information
- Current team: SV Hummetroth
- Number: 1

Youth career
- Spartak Subotica

Senior career*
| Years | Team | Apps | (Gls) |
| 2008–2014 | Spartak Subotica | 115 | (0) |
| 2014–2016 | Kalloni | 3 | (0) |
| 2016–2017 | Borac Čačak | 20 | (0) |
| 2017–2020 | Szeged | 40 | (0) |
| 2020–2021 | Mezőkövesd | 0 | (0) |
| 2022 | SF Friedrichsdorf | 6 | (0) |
| 2023- | SV Hummetroth | 17 | (0) |

International career^{‡}
| 2011–2012 | Serbia U21 | 9 | (0) |
| 2012 | Serbia | 1 | (0) |
- * Club domestic league appearances and goals as of 15 May 2020 ‡ National team caps and goals as of 5 August 2016

Branimir Aleksić (Serbian Cyrillic: Бранимир Алексић; born 24 December 1990) is a Serbian footballer who plays as a goalkeeper for SV Hummetroth. He made one appearance for the Serbia national team.

== Club career ==
Aleksić came through the youth system at his hometown club Spartak Subotica. He made his senior debut for the club during the 2008–09 season after the club already merged with Zlatibor Voda. Aleksić made his Serbian SuperLiga debut in the 2009–10 season. He became the first choice goalkeeper after the departure of Milan Jovanić from the club, missing only one league match during the 2010–11 season. Aleksić made exactly the same number of league games in the following two seasons.

== International career ==
After making his debut in early 2011, Aleksić played regularly for the Serbian national under-21 team during the qualifications for the 2013 UEFA Under-21 Championship. He made his debut for the senior side in a friendly match against Sweden on 5 June 2012.

== Career statistics ==
=== Club ===
As of 5 July 2017

Appearances and goals by club, season and competition
| Club | Season | League | | | Cup | | Continental | | Other | | Total | |
| Club | Season | Division | Apps | Goals | Apps | Goals | Apps | Goals | Apps | Goals | Apps | Goals |
|---|---|---|---|---|---|---|---|---|---|---|---|---|
| Spartak Subotica | 2009–10 | Serbian SuperLiga | 1 | 0 | 0 | 0 | — | | — | | 1 | 0 |
| Spartak Subotica | 2010–11 | Serbian SuperLiga | 29 | 0 | 2 | 0 | 0 | 0 | — | | 32 | 0 |
| Spartak Subotica | 2011–12 | Serbian SuperLiga | 29 | 0 | 3 | 0 | — | | — | | 32 | 0 |
| Spartak Subotica | 2012–13 | Serbian SuperLiga | 29 | 0 | 2 | 0 | — | | — | | 31 | 0 |
| Spartak Subotica | 2013–14 | Serbian SuperLiga | 25 | 0 | 2 | 0 | — | | — | | 27 | 0 |
| Spartak Subotica | Total | | 115 | 0 | 9 | 0 | 0 | 0 | 0 | 0 | 124 | 0 |
| AEL Kalloni | 2014–15 | Super League Greece | 3 | 0 | 2 | 0 | — | | — | | 5 | 0 |
| AEL Kalloni | 2015–16 | Super League Greece | 0 | 0 | 0 | 0 | — | | — | | 0 | 0 |
| AEL Kalloni | Total | | 3 | 0 | 2 | 0 | 0 | 0 | 0 | 0 | 5 | 0 |
| Borac Čačak | 2016–17 | Serbian SuperLiga | 20 | 0 | 3 | 0 | 0 | 0 | 0 | 0 | 23 | 0 |
| Career total | | | 138 | 0 | 14 | 0 | 0 | 0 | 0 | 0 | 152 | 0 |

=== International ===
Serbia national team
| Year | Apps | Goals |
|---|---|---|
| 2012 | 1 | 0 |
| Total | 1 | 0 |
