= Danijel Gašić =

Serbian footballer

Personal information
- Full name: Danijel Gašić
- Date of birth: January 19, 1987 (age 39)
- Place of birth: Aleksandrovac, SFR Yugoslavia
- Height: 1.96 m (6 ft 5 in)
- Position: Centre-back

Youth career
- Župa Aleksandrovac

Senior career*
Years	Team	Apps	(Gls)
2005–2007	Trayal Kruševac		
2007–2011	Napredak Kruševac	66	(5)
2011–2013	OFK Beograd	35	(0)
2013	AEL Kalloni	9	(0)
2014	Sloga Kraljevo	11	(0)
2014–2016	Jagodina	48	(2)
2016–2019	Dinamo Vranje	76	(3)
- * Club domestic league appearances and goals

Danijel Gašić (Serbian Cyrillic: Данијел Гашић; born 19 January 1987) is a Serbian retired footballer, who played as a defender.

== Club career ==
Gašić has started his career with Župa, and later, he moved to Kruševac, in Trayal. Gašić joined to Napredak in season 2007–08, but for that season, he played only 4 league matches. He did not start the 2008-09 season as a first choice, but later, he played constantly, and made 19 appearances. In the 2009–10 season, he was already in starting 11. He missed some matches, but he had 21 appearances and scored 2 goals, but not enough to stay in Serbian SuperLiga with Napredak. Also, he got a red card on last fixture, after 28 minutes, in loss of his team versus Vojvodina on the Karađorđe Stadium with result 7:0. He also stayed with Napredak in the 2010-11 season, and played in Serbian First League. Team has not the great results, but Gašić was one of better players. He played 22 matches and scored 3 goals. After he was scouted around a year long time, he arrived at OFK as a perspective player on a stopper place. In first season playing for OFK Beograd, he played 17 times in league, and 1 in cup matches. The first half of the 2012-13 season was not great, because team has bad results, he scored one own goal, and later, he has been injured. Second half of season was much better. Team had better results when he was playing. Gašić made 9 league, and 2 cup appearances for AEL Kalloni., scoring 1 goal. He joined to Sloga Kraljevo for second half of season 2013–14. After doubtful match versus Dolina Padina, and first home-lost in season, with result 1:2, direction of Sloga Kraljevo fired him and Bojan Šejić. As a member of FK Jagodina, Gašić played between 2014 and 2016, when he moved to Dinamo Vranje.

At the end of the 2018/19 season, Gašić decided to retire.

== Career statistics ==
=== Club ===
As of 31 May 2018

Club performance			League		Cup		Continental		Total	
Season	Club	League	Apps	Goals	Apps	Goals	Apps	Goals	Apps	Goals
Serbia			League		Serbian Cup		Europe		Total	
2007–08	Napredak	SuperLiga	4	0	0	0	0	0	4	0
2008–09	Napredak	SuperLiga	19	0	0	0	0	0	19	0
2009–10	Napredak	SuperLiga	21	2	0	0	0	0	21	2
2010–11	Napredak	First League	22	3	0	0	0	0	22	3
2011–12	OFK Beograd	SuperLiga	17	0	1	0	0	0	18	0
2012–13	OFK Beograd	SuperLiga	18	0	3	0	0	0	21	0
Greece			League		Greek Cup		Europe		Total	
2013–14	AEL Kalloni	Super League Greece	9	0	2	1	0	0	11	1
Serbia			League		Serbian Cup		Europe		Total	
2013–14	Sloga Kraljevo	First League	11	0	0	0	0	0	11	0
2014–15	Jagodina	SuperLiga	19	1	4	0	2	0	25	1
2015–16	Jagodina	SuperLiga	29	1	1	0	0	0	30	1
2016–17	Dinamo Vranje	First League	25	0	1	0	0	0	26	0
2017–18	Dinamo Vranje	First League	26	2	1	0	0	0	27	2
			League		Cup		Continental		Total	
Total	Serbia		211	9	11	0	2	0	224	9
Total	Greece		9	0	2	1	0	0	11	1
Career total			220	9	13	1	2	0	235	10
