= Jordi Martín (footballer, born 1991) =

Spanish footballer

Personal information
- Full name: Jordi Vidal Martín Rojas
- Date of birth: 7 February 1991 (age 35)
- Place of birth: Arrecife, Spain
- Height: 1.70 m (5 ft 7 in)
- Position: Midfielder

Team information
- Current team: San Bartolomé

Youth career
- 2002–2004: Teguise
- 2004–2010: Real Madrid

Senior career*
Years	Team	Apps	(Gls)
2010–2012	Real Madrid C	67	(8)
2013–2014	Las Palmas B	10	(0)
2014–2015	Kallithea	13	(1)
2015	Kalloni	1	(0)
2015–2016	Leioa	2	(0)
2016	Gimnástica	13	(0)
2016–2018	Oberlausitz Neugersdorf	40	(1)
2018–2019	Lanzarote	9	(1)
2019	Manchego	9	(0)
2019–2020	Víkingur Ólafsvík	2	(0)
2020–	San Bartolomé		
- * Club domestic league appearances and goals as of 22:46, 5 December 2019 (UTC)

Jordi Vidal Martín Rojas (born 7 February 1991) is a Spanish professional footballer who plays for San Bartolomé as a midfielder.

== Club career ==
Born in Arrecife, Province of Las Palmas, Vidal joined Real Madrid's youth system in 2004, at the age of 13. He made his debut as a senior with the third team, for which he appeared in two full Tercera División seasons.

In the 2013 summer, after an unsuccessful trial for AEL Limassol from the Cypriot First Division, Martín returned to his native Canary Islands and signed for UD Las Palmas Atlético. From January 2014 to June 2015 he competed in Greece, with Kallithea F.C. and AEL Kalloni FC; his debut in top flight football arrived whilst at the service of the latter club, as he started and played 74 minutes in a 1–0 home win against PAS Giannina F.C. for the Super League.

On 6 August 2015, Martín returned to Spain and its Segunda División B and joined SD Leioa.

Vidal joined CD Manchego Ciudad Real on 1 February 2019.
