= Charalampos Siligardakis =

Greek footballer

Personal information
- Date of birth: 17 March 1982 (age 44)
- Place of birth: Athens, Greece
- Height: 1.84 m (6 ft 1/2 in)
- Position: Midfielder

Senior career*
Years	Team	Apps	(Gls)
2000–2002	Aris	0	(0)
2001–2002	→ Marko (loan)	25	(1)
2003	Egaleo	4	(0)
2005–2006	AEK Larnaca	21	(3)
2006–2007	Nea Salamis	13	(0)
2007–2008	Digenis Akritas Morphou	22	(2)
2008–2011	Ethnikos Piraeus	94	(1)
2011–2012	Veria	3	(0)
2012–2014	AEL Kalloni	37	(0)
2014–2015	Chania	19	(0)
2015–2016	Lamia	26	(0)
2016–2017	Panelefsiniakos	28	(1)
2017	Diagoras Rodou		
2017–2018	Tamynaikos Aliveriou		
2018–2019	Panthiraikos		
2019	Chalkida		
2019-2020	Olympiakos Agiou Stefanou		
- * Club domestic league appearances and goals as of 24 August 2020

Charalampos Siligardakis (Greek: Χαράλαμπος Σιλιγαρδάκης, born 17 March 1982) is a Greek former professional footballer who played as a midfielder.

== Career ==
Born in Greece, Siligardakis began playing football with Aris Thessaloniki F.C. in the Super League (Alpha Ethniki). In 2001 Siligardakis joined Egaleo F.C. from Aris, and made four Super League appearances for the club. Since then he joined many Football clubs in Greece and Cyprus (Super League and Football league).

On 2 September 2017, Siligardakis joined Diagoras Rodou. He played there for less than two months, before he joined Tamynaikos Aliveriou on 30 October 2017.

After seven months at Panthiraikos, Siligardakis joined Chalkida on 31 January 2019.

== Biography ==
2000-2001 Aris FC Super League

2002-2003(1) Aris FC Super League

2002-2003(2) Egaleo FC Super League

2003-2004 Egaleo FC Super League

2005-2006 AEK FC Larnaca Cyprus A'

2006-2007 Nea Salamis FC Cyprus A'

2007-2008 Digenis Akritas Cyprus Β'

2008-2009 Ethnikos Piraeus Football League

2009-2010 Ethnikos Piraeus Football League

2010-2011 Ethnikos Piraeus Football League

2011-2012(1) Veria FC Football League

2011-2012(2) AEL Kallonis Football League

2012-2013(1) AEL Kallonis Super League
