= Paul Keita =

Senegalese footballer

Paul Fadiala Keita
Personal information
- Date of birth: 23 June 1992 (age 34)
- Place of birth: Dakar, Senegal
- Height: 1.94 m (6 ft 4 1/2 in)
- Position: Defensive midfielder

Team information
- Current team: URSL Visé

Youth career
- Douanes
- Benfica

Senior career*
Years	Team	Apps	(Gls)
2009–2014	PAS Giannina	68	(0)
2014–2016	AEL Kalloni	53	(2)
2016–2017	Atromitos	21	(0)
2017	Kerkyra	5	(0)
2017–2018	Mezőkövesd	14	(0)
2018–2020	Waasland-Beveren	22	(0)
2021	Akhisarspor	7	(0)
2021–	URSL Visé	0	(0)

International career
2006–2007	Senegal U17	5	(0)
2010–2011	Senegal U20	7	(0)
- * Club domestic league appearances and goals as of 25 April 2021

Paul Fadiala Keita (born 23 June 1992) is a Senegalese footballer who plays as a defensive midfielder for Belgian club URSL Visé.

== Club career ==
Keita began his professional career with Greek Football League side PAS Giannina in 2010, having previously played for the youth sides of Senegal Premier League side AS Douanes and Primeira Liga side S.L. Benfica. His professional début for PAS Giannina came in a 3–1 victory over Pierikos on 11 October 2010. He became a regular player for PAS Giannina that year, and went on to make a total of 29 appearances for the club as they were promoted to the Super League. However, his appearances became limited over the next three seasons; although he made 24 appearances during the 2012–13 season, only nine of these were starts. After making nine appearances during the 2013–14 season, Keita switched to Super League side AEL Kalloni, and made twelve appearances for his new club before the end of the season. On 16 January 2016, Keita signed a 2 1/2-year contract with Atromitos for an undisclosed fee.

Kaita signed for Kerkyra on 31 January 2017 but was released on 3 March 2017.

On 23 July 2021, he signed a two-year contract with the third-tier Belgian National Division 1 club URSL Visé.

== Career statistics ==
As of match played 9 December 2017

Club	Season	League			National Cup		League Cup		Continental		Total	
Club	Season	Division	Apps	Goals	Apps	Goals	Apps	Goals	Apps	Goals	Apps	Goals
PAS Giannina	2010–11	Greek Football League	29	0	2	0	—		—		31	0
PAS Giannina	2011–12	Super League Greece	6	0	1	0	—		—		7	0
PAS Giannina	2012–13	Super League Greece	24	0	5	0	—		—		29	0
PAS Giannina	2013–14	Super League Greece	9	0	2	0	—		—		11	0
PAS Giannina	Total		68	0	10	0	—		—		78	0
AEL Kalloni	2013–14	Super League Greece	12	1	1	0	—		–		13	1
AEL Kalloni	2014–15	Super League Greece	28	1	1	0	—		–		29	1
AEL Kalloni	2015–16	Super League Greece	13	0	1	0	–		–		14	0
AEL Kalloni	Total		53	2	3	0	–		–		56	2
Atromitos	2015–16	Super League Greece	9	0	3	0	–		–		12	0
Atromitos	2016–17	Super League Greece	12	0	3	0	–		–		15	0
Atromitos	Total		21	0	6	0	–		–		27	0
Kerkyra	2016–17	Super League Greece	5	0	0	0	–		–		5	0
Kerkyra	Total		5	0	0	0	–		–		5	0
Mezőkövesd	2017–18	Nemzeti Bajnokság I	14	0	2	0	–		–		16	0
Mezőkövesd	Total		14	0	2	0	–		–		16	0
Career total			161	2	21	0	–		–		182	2
