= Andrew Hogg =

Maltese footballer (born 1985)

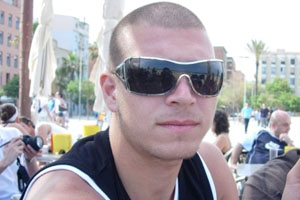
- Portrait of Andrew Hogg in 2009

Personal information
- Full name: Andrew James Hogg
- Date of birth: 2 March 1985 (age 41)
- Place of birth: Kingston upon Thames, England
- Height: 1.83 m (6 ft 0 in)
- Position: Goalkeeper

Team information
- Current team: Birkirkara
- Number: 1

Youth career
- 2001–2004: Pietà Hotspurs
- 2003–2004: → Bari (loan)

Senior career*
| Years | Team | Apps | (Gls) |
| 2001–2007 | Pietà Hotspurs | 63 | (0) |
| 2003–2004 | → Bari (loan) | 0 | (0) |
| 2007–2012 | Valletta | 120 | (0) |
| 2012–2013 | Enosis Neon Paralimni | 24 | (0) |
| 2013–2016 | Kalloni | 57 | (0) |
| 2016–2019 | Hibernians | 56 | (0) |
| 2019–2021 | Birkirkara | 28 | (0) |

International career^{‡}
| 2002–2003 | Malta U19 | 2 | (0) |
| 2006 | Malta U21 | 2 | (0) |
| 2006–2019 | Malta | 67 | (0) |
- * Club domestic league appearances and goals as of 18:55, 30 September 2020 (UTC) ‡ National team caps and goals as of 18:55, 6 October 2019 (UTC)

Andrew James Hogg (born 2 March 1985) is a former professional footballer who played as a goalkeeper for Maltese side Birkirkara. Born in England, he earned more than 60 caps for the Malta national team.

== International career ==
Hogg made his debut with Malta in a friendly against Lithuania in November 2006. He particularly stood out with his national team with a brilliant individual performance against England during a 2018 World Cup qualifier. At the end of 2019, he announced his retirement from the national team.

== Honours ==
Valletta

- Maltese Premier League: 2007-08, 2010–11, 2011–12
- Maltese FA Trophy runner-up: 2010–11
- Maltese Super Cup runner-up: 2010, 2011

Hibernians

- Maltese Premier League: 2016–17
