= Mournies =

Village in Crete, Greece

Mournies Μουρνιές
- Community
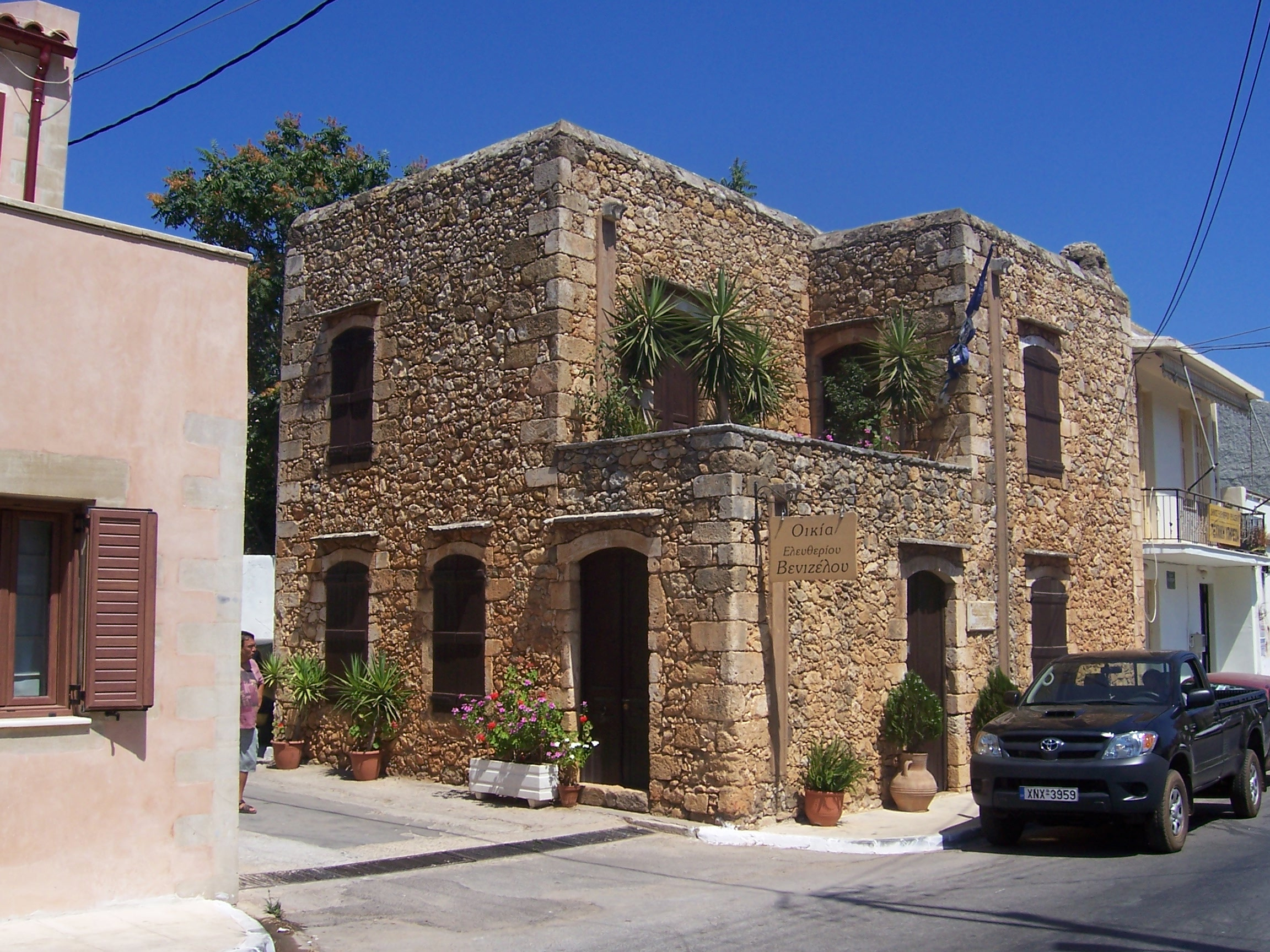
- The house in which Eleftherios Venizelos was born in Mournies

- Location within Greece
- Coordinates: 35°29′06″N 24°00′47″E
- Country: Greece
- Administrative region: Crete
- Regional unit: Chania
- Municipality: Chania
- Municipal unit: Eleftherios Venizelos

Population (2021)
  - Community: 7,425
- Time zone: UTC+2 (EET)
  - Summer (DST): UTC+3 (EEST)

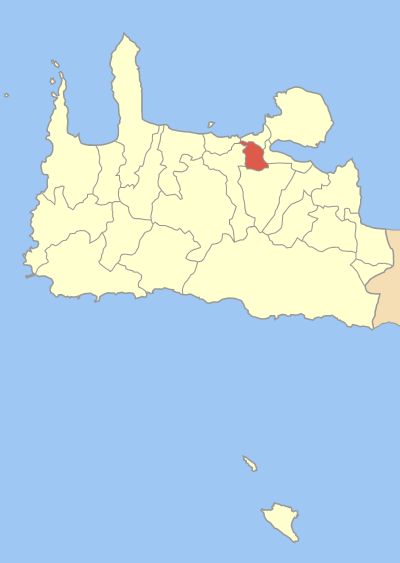
Locator map of Eleftherios Venizelos municipality (Δήμος Ελευθερίου Βενιζέλου) in Chania prefecture (Νομός Χανίων) on the island of Crete in Greece.

Mournies (Greek: Μουρνιές) is a village on the Greek island of Crete, in the regional unit of Chania. Between 1997 and 2010, it was the seat of the former municipality of Eleftherios Venizelos. Mournies is famous for being the place of birth of the statesman Eleftherios Venizelos.
