= Haravgi Larissa F.C. =

Haravgi Larissa
- Full name: Αθλητικός & Εκπολιτιστικός Σύλλογος Χαραυγή
- Founded: 1981 (refounded in 2005)
- Ground: Thessaliko Ground; Larissa, Greece
- League: Larissa FCA Third Division
- 2025–26: Larissa FCA Third Division (Group 2), 10th
Home colours	Away colours

Haravgi Larissa F.C. (Greek: Α.Ε.Σ. Χαραυγή), also known simply as Haravgi is a Greek football club, based in Larissa. The colours of the team are green and yellow.

== History ==
The club was founded in 1982 as Haravgi A.E. (Greek: Α.E. Χαραυγη), in the Haravgi (former Kali Kardia) district of Larissa town (Greek: Λάρισα) located in the Thessaly region of Greece. The club started from the lower divisions of the Larissa FCA, and in 1992 with chairman Stavros Pappas at the helm it eventually gained promotion to the top amateur division which was equivalent to the 5th overall division in the Greek football league system. Haravgi stayed there for 4 seasons only to be relegated in 1996. For the next four seasons the team made several attempts to win promotion but they ended in failure. Financial troubles led to the dissolution of the club in 2000. The most famous manager of the club was former goalkeeper Theologis Papadopoulos who had even been a member of the Greek national team, while the last chairman of the club was Kostas Voutiritsas, a former Haravgi player and brother of Theodoros Voutiritsas, another former Greek national team footballer.
The club used the Anthoupoli Ground, which is part of the Anthoupoli Athletic Center complex, located in the Anthoupoli district in Larissa for its home games and it developed an intense rivalry with Anthoupoli Larissa, another local team who Haravgi shared the ground with.

=== Haravgi players in Greek first division ===
Haravgi came into the spotlight in the mid 90s when two of its squads members were transferred to Alpha Ethniki teams, the highest division in the Greek football league system: Dimitris Pappas and Konstantinos Mangos. These two footballers are the most important players who came out of the youth ranks of the club.

Striker Dimitris Pappas who is currently the coach and board member of the successor club Haravgi A.E.S. took a massive step in his career by getting transferred to AEL in the summer of 1995 under new manager Giannis Mantzourakis.
The same year midfielder Kostas Mangos caught the eye of OFI's Dutch manager Eugène Gerards and was subsequently signed by the club from Heraklion. Maggos would later on return to his hometown to play for AEL in the Greek Beta Ethniki, after even being part of an OFI squad that played in the 1997-98 UEFA Cup against teams like Ferencváros and Auxerre. Dimitris Tsapatoris is also another former Haravgi footballer who played in the first division for 3 seasons (Panathinaikos, Olympiacos Volos, AEL) after being transferred to Apollon Larissa in the late 1980s.

Other players who featured in national divisions were Panagiotis Migas (AEL - Beta Ethniki and Apollon Larissa - Gamma Ethniki)), Sotiris Peritogiannis (Apollon Larissa - Gamma Ethniki), Kostas Pitsaris (AOK N.Karyes - Delta Ethniki), Thanasis Stamatis (Poseidon Neon Poron - Beta Ethniki and Pyrgetos - Delta Ethniki) and Nikos Kakagiannis (Iraklis Larissa, AED Nikaia - Delta Ethniki).

=== Record of youngest hat-trick scorer ===
Haravgi Larissa produced the youngest footballer ever to score a hat-trick. 14-year-old striker Ntinos Pontikas in his debut as a starter scored a hat-trick for Haravgi in an 4–3 away defeat by Ampelokipoi Larissa in 1996. In that game, future Greece international player Vangelis Moras was on the bench being a squad member of AO Ampelokipoi, the club he started his career from as a forward. Pontikas' feat still remains a record in football.

=== Notable players ===
- (Greece) Kostas Mangos
- (Greece) Dimitris Pappas
- (Greece) Giorgos Skafidas
- (Greece) Kostas Voutiritsas
- (Greece) Ilias Apostolaras

=== Notable managers ===
- (Greece) Theologis Papadopoulos
- (Greece) Ilias Selionis

=== Notable chairmen ===
- (Greece) Stavros Pappas
- (Greece) Giorgos Pappas
- (Greece) Kostas Voutiritsas

== Rivalries ==
The rivalry with Anthoupoli Larissa was one of the fiercest in the town and the Anthoupoli Ground was crowded even in the youth games between the rivals. The main reason for the rivalry was the vicinity of the two districts and the shared ground. Anthoupoli that produced players like Giannis Valaoras, Apostolos Tsianakas and Stelios Tsiantoulis had the upper hand in the matches between the two teams overall.

== Modern era ==
A new sports club was formed in the early 2000s under the name of Haravgi Larissa A.E.S, (Greek: Αθλητικός και Εκπολιτιστικός Σύλλογος Χαραυγή) using initially orange and grey as its colours and it is considered the continuation of the old club. The re-founded club started playing in the Thessaliko ground instead of the traditional Anthoupoli ground which Haravgi Larissa used to share with their arch rivals Anthoupoli Larissa. It later created a basketball and a handball department. Both Dimitris Pappas and Konstantinos Mangos have also played for the successor club Haravgi A.E.S. in the later stages of their career, alongside Giorgos Dodontsakis, a former first division player. Dimitris Pappas is the current coach of team that competes in the Larissa FCA B Division for the 2020–21 season. Giorgos Skafidas who was also squad member for the original club took over as president in 2020, while he joined the team as a player being one of the oldest in Greek football and the oldest in the Larissa Football Clubs Association.

== Sources ==
Koltsidas, Vangelis (2018). ΤΟ ΕΡΑΣΙΤΕΧΝΙΚΟ ΠΟΔΟΣΦΑΙΡΟ ΣΤΟ ΝΟΜΟ ΛΑΡΙΣΑΣ (PDF). p. 83. Archived from the original (PDF) on 2022-11-12.
