= Iraklis Halki =

Iraklis Chalkis
- Full name: Iraklis Chalkis
- Founded: 1954
- Ground: Halki Municipality Stadium, Larissa, Greece
- Chairman: Angelos Mitsi
- Manager: Spyros Moutsios
- League: Larissa FCA
Home colours	Away colours

Iraklis Chalkis (Greek: Ηρακλής Χάλκης) is a football and sports club based in Halki, Thessaly, Greece and currently competes in the Larissa FCA league. The colours of the club are blue and white. Vasilios Koutsianikoulis started his career from Iraklis before he was dubbed Greek Messi playing subsequently for Ergotelis.

== History ==
The club was founded officially in 1954 in Halki, Larissa. It was named after Greek mythology hero Heracles and influenced by first division club Iraklis Thessaloniki adopting Iraklis' colours and badge like many other clubs in Greece. Iraklis Halki started competing in the lowest division of the Larissa Football Clubs Association and it met great success in the 1980s and 1990s. During that time the club played in Delta Ethniki, the fourth tier of the Greek football pyramid competing against experienced teams such as Olympiacos Volos, Iraklis Ptolemaidos, Kozani, Kastoria, and other local rivals like Iraklis Larissa, Apollon Larissa, Toxotis Larissa and Achilleas Farsala. In 1987 it missed out on promotion to Gamma Ethniki for just 1 point to Anagennisi Kolindros. The following season the club were relegated on equal points to Toxotis Larissa, finishing just 8th on the table.After many successful runs in the Greek fourth division the club was relegated in 2007.Vasilios Koutsianikoulis' uncle, Thomas, is considered the club's most legendary player with great contribution and excellent leadership in the 1980s and 1990s.
Iraklis also has a basketball department.

== Honours ==
- Delta Ethniki:
  - Runners-up (1): 1986–87
- Larissa FCA Championship:

- Winners (7): 1967, 1968, 1982, 1989, 1995, 1997, 2001

- Larissa FCA Cup:

- Winners (5): 1985, 1995, 1998, 2006, 2007
  - Runners-up (7): 1973, 1981, 1984, 1989, 1996, 1999, 2002

- Larissa FCA Super Cup:

- Winners (1): 2006
  - Runners-up (1): 2007

=== Classification in Delta Ethniki ===
Season	Classification	Group
1983-84	3d	Group 4
1984-85	3d	Group 4
1985-86	8th	Group 5
1986-87	2nd	Group 5
1987-88	8th	Group 1
1989-90	17th	Group 3
1989-90	21st	Group 5
1995-96	10th	Group 5
1997-98	2nd	Group 5
1998-99	5th	Group 5
1999-00	11th	Group 5
2000-01	12th	Group 5
2002-03	7th	Group 4
2003-04	10th	Group 4
2004-05	6th	Group 4
2005-06	5th	Group 4
2006-07	12th	Group 4

== Notable players ==
- (Greece) Vasilios Koutsianikoulis
- (Greece) Thomas Koutsianikoulis
- (Greece) Vangelis Souliotis
- (Greece) Vagios Karaferis
- (Greece) Thanasis Papageorgiou
- (Greece) Giannis Saltas

== Notable coaches ==
- (Greece) Christos Gkatas
- (Greece) Nikos Andreou
