= Christos Papadopoulos (footballer) =

Greek footballer (born 2004)

Personal information
- Date of birth: 1 November 2004 (age 21)
- Place of birth: Larissa, Greece
- Height: 1.88 m (6 ft 2 in)
- Position: Midfielder

Team information
- Current team: Levadiakos
- Number: 74

Youth career
- –2021: Falaniakos
- 2021: Aetos Makrychori
- 2022: Iraklis Larissa
- 2022–2024: Genoa

Senior career*
Years	Team	Apps	(Gls)
2024–2026	Genoa	1	(0)
2024–2025	→ Juventus Next Gen (loan)	19	(1)
2024–2025	→ Juventus (loan)	0	(0)
2025–2026	→ Atalanta U23 (loan)	5	(0)
2026–	Levadiakos	6	(0)

International career^{‡}
2024–	Greece U21	2	(0)
- * Club domestic league appearances and goals as of 23 August 2026 ‡ National team caps and goals as of 10 October 2025

Christos Papadopoulos (Greek: Χρήστος Παπαδόπουλος; born 1 November 2004) is a Greek professional footballer who plays as a midfielder for Super League club Levadiakos.

== Club career ==
As a youth player, Papadopoulos joined the youth academy of Greek side Falaniakos. In 2021, he joined the youth academy of Greek side Aetos Makrychori before joining the youth academy of Greek side Iraklis Larissa in 2022. The same year, he joined the youth academy of Serie A side Genoa, where he started his senior career. On 5 May 2024, he debuted for the club during a 3–3 away draw with Milan in the league. Ahead of the 2024–25 season, he was sent on loan to Serie A side Juventus, where he also played for the club's reserve team.

On 30 August 2025, he was loaned to another Serie C reserve team, Atalanta U23.

On 28 January 2026, Papadopoulos signed for Super League Greece side Levadiakos.

== Style of play ==
Papadopolous plays as a midfielder and is left-footed. Italian newspaper Tuttosport wrote that "he has excellent physical strength that allows him to give substance to the... midfield".
