= Aris Larissa =

- Full name: Aris Larissa F.C.
- Founded: 1926
- Dissolved: 1964 (refounded 1984)
- Ground: Old Alcazar Stadium, Athletic Center of Neapolis (500)
- Capacity: 8.000
- Chairman: Dionysis Tomporis
- League: Larissa FCA
- 2013-14: B Division
Home colours	Away colours

Aris Larissa (Greek: Άρης Λάρισας), was a Greek football club based in the town of Larissa and it was named after Ares (Mars in Latin), the God of War, and one of the Twelve Olympians in Greek mythology. The club participated in Beta Ethniki in 1960-61 and was one of the 5 local Larissa clubs that formed AEL in 1964.

== History ==
=== Early years ===
Aris Larissa was founded in 1926 and it was one of the first football clubs to start operations in the town of Larissa among others such as Daphne Larissa, Ethnikos Larissa, Keravnos Larissa and Amilla Larissa. In the early 1930s the club would officially compete in the Larissa League under the umbrella of the Thessaly Football Clubs Association which was founded in 1929. The rival teams competed in the Larissa League at the team were Larisaikos F.C. and Iraklis Larissa. From 1933 until 1939 Aris was inactive resuming operations just one year before Greece was involved in the WW II.

=== 1940s: Name change ===
During the Axis occupation of Greece between 1941 and 1944, Aris changed its name to Black Eagle (Greek: Μαύρος Αετός) which was more of a reference to the glory history of Byzantium and it continued to play unofficial matches mainly in the open space in front of Saint Nicholas church in Larissa. Moreover, the club's name change could be considered as symbolic part of the ongoing Greek Resistance and the football activities gave an opportunity to its players to meet and exchange information without being suspicious by the German authorities.
After the end of the occupation, Black Eagle became Aris again and though it was financially weak resumed operations in 1945. Having lost their best footballers Antonoulis, Kremetis, Gloupos, Papageorgiou to much wealthier local rival Iraklis Larissa, they played in the B Division of the Thessaly Football League and the 4th Greek football league system. In 1947, Aris was just about to be dissolved after not being able to find any financial sources, but then it was when Giorgos Ziazias came, a fierce supporter who took over as a chairman to sponsor, to organise and save the club from its demise. And a year later, in 1948, Aris Larissa driven by its main man Kostas Aeris and young players like, Tasos Aprilis, Manikas, Makris, Kaiafas, Margaritis, Papadimitriou, Tsaltas, Dalanikas would win promotion to the A Division of the Thessaly Football Clubs Association, the equivalent of the third tier in Greek football.

=== 1950s: Victory over Panathinaikos ===
In the 1950s, Aris was established as one of the best teams in Larissa and one of the most competitive in the region of Thessaly among powerful teams like Olympiacos Volos, Niki Volos, and Iraklis Larissa. On 28 May 1950, Aris beat Greek champions Panathinaikos by 3–2 in a crowded Alcazar Stadium with forward Kostas Aeris scoring all three goals. And 6 years later, Aris would lose one of its greatest player to Iraklis Larissa once again when Aeris signed for the Blues for 20.000 drachmas a year, which made him one of the best paid Greek footballers at the time. Nevertheless, Aris remained in the A Division of the Thessaly Football League for 13 consecutive seasons from 1948 until 1960, when the Larissa Football Clubs Association was created.

=== 1960-1964: Beta Ethniki and merger ===
Aris Larissa were runners-up in the inaugural 1960-61 league and finished third in their last season in 1963–64 before they merged with Iraklis Larissa, Larisaikos F.C. and Toxotis Larissa. They played in Greek second division in 1961 but they were finished at the bottom of the table. In June 1964 Aris agreed to give its best players to the new club of the town AEL: Giorgos Voutsilas, Thodoris Passas, Spyros Mponitsis, Lakis Zafeiropoulos, Tasos Aprilis. After that Aris was merged with a rather lowly club AO Emporoipallilon Larissa (Football Club of Larissa Merchants) and they formed Doxa Emporoipallilon or simply known as Doxa Larissa.

== Classification in Greek Second division ==
Season	Classification	Group
1960-61	10th	Group Central

== Notable players ==
- (Greece) Kostas Aeris
- (Greece) Giorgos Voutsilas
- (Greece) Spyros Mponitsis
- (Greece) Thodoris Passas
- (Greece) Lakis Zafeiropoulos
- (Greece) Tasos Aprilis
- (Greece) Savvas Siatravanis
- (Greece) Vasilios Koutsianikoulis

== Notable chairmen ==
- (Greece) Giorgos Ziazias
- (Greece) Dionysis Tomporis

== The return of Aris Larissa in 1984 ==
A local club from the Exi Dromoi district of Larissa right next to Pineios River called Exidromiakos and founded in 1982 was renamed to Aris Larissa (Greek: Αθλητικος Ομιλος Αρης Λαρισας) just 2 years later, in 1984, giving life again to the historic club. It was exactly 20 years after its dissolution. Under the guidance of former AEL member of board of directors and owner of one of the first sport newspapers in Thessaly, chairman Dionysis Tomporis in the early 1990s, Aris Larissa had many decent runs in the Larissa Football League focusing on its youth academy and was considered one of the wealthiest amateur clubs. In May 1996, the club celberated its 70th anniversary inviting famous managers such as Juan Ramon Rocha, Horacio Morales, Takis Parafestas, Alketas Panagoulias, Jacek Gmoch and Makis Katsavakis to the celebratory event.
Aris used the pitches of Pirinas B for its football home matches until 2009, when the complex was demolished in order for the AEL FC Arena to be built on the location. Until the 1990s the club also had a basketball section.
Tomporis' death in December 2013, after more than 20 years as chairman, meant that the 2013-14 was the last one for the club. Since then Aris has played several unofficial games under one of its old names Doxa Emporoipallilon.

== Stadium ==
Aris used to play at the Alcazar Stadium in the city of Larissa until 1964. After its refounding and under Dionysis Tomporis presidency, the club played its home games at the Pirinas B complex in the Neapolis neighborhood until 2009, when the AEL FC Arena was built on the site. Then, the club moved to the Neapolis complex across the street.

== Basketball section ==
Aris founded a basketball department in 1954 playing its home games at an open court in the town's main high school. The club played games against arch rivals Iraklis Larissa, historic G.S. Larissa and other opponents and it probably lasted until the late 1950s. After the club's refounding in 1984, the basketball department was also revived in the 1990s competing in the Thessaly league.
