= Nikos Lougos =

Greek footballer

Personal information
- Full name: Nikolaos Lougos
- Date of birth: 27 July 1992 (age 34)
- Place of birth: Larissa, Greece
- Height: 1.79 m (5 ft 10 in)
- Position: Left-back

Youth career
- AEL

Senior career*
Years	Team	Apps	(Gls)
2011–2012	Tyrnavos		
2012	Pyrgetos		
2012–2013	Paniliakos	8	(1)
2013–2014	Dotieas Agia		
2014	Niki Volos		
2014–2015	PAEEK	13	(0)
2015–2016	Digenis Oroklinis		
2016	Chalkida		
2016–2017	Ethnikos Filippiada		
2017	Asteras Amaliadas		
2017–2018	Nea Salamis	0	(0)
2019	Karmiotissa	5	(0)
2019–2020	Aris Limassol	3	(0)
- * Club domestic league appearances and goals

Nikos Lougos (Greek: Νίκος Λούγκος; born 27 July 1992) is a Greek former professional footballer who played as a left-back.
