= Konstantinos Nebegleras =

Greek footballer

Personal information
- Date of birth: 14 April 1975 (age 51)
- Place of birth: Larissa, Greece
- Height: 1.81 m (5 ft 11 1/2 in)
- Position: Defensive midfielder

Team information
- Current team: Doxa Drama (manager)

Youth career
- –1993: AEL

Senior career*
Years	Team	Apps	(Gls)
1993–1997	AEL	89	(7)
1997–2001	Paniliakos	87	(5)
2001–2005	Iraklis	97	(4)
2005–2009	Aris	109	(4)
2009–2011	Atromitos	70	(3)
2011–2015	AEL	112	(9)
2015–2018	Achilleas Farsala	86	(12)
2018–2019	Dafni Glafki	3	(0)
2019	Atromitos Palamas	15	(2)
2019–2020	Iraklis Larissa	23	(0)
Total		691	(46)

International career
2004	Greece Olympic (O.P.)	3	(0)
2001	Greece	1	(0)

Managerial career
- 2018: Trikala (technical director)
- 2019–2020: Iraklis Larissa U16 (assistant)
- 2020–2022: Falaniakos
- 2022–2023: Achilleas Farsala
- 2023–2024: AEL U17
- 2024–2025: AEL U17 (technical director)
- 2025: Elassona
- 2025: Trikala
- 2025–2026: Anthoupoli Larissa
- 2026–: Doxa Drama
- * Club domestic league appearances and goals

Konstantinos Nebegleras (Greek: Κωνσταντίνος Νεμπεγλέρας; born 14 April 1975) is a Greek former professional footballer and manager. He is the current manager of Gamma Ethniki club Doxa Drama.

== Club career ==
Nebegleras was born in Larissa, and began his professional career in 1993 with his home team AEL, where he stayed for 4 years. In 1997, he continued his career at Paniliakos in the Alpha Ethniki. During the 2001 winter transfer period, he signed for Iraklis, following the recommendations of then coach, Ioannis Kyrastas. During the 2004–05 season, he fell into disfavor by the team's administration, thus not being considered anymore, resulting in Nebegleras signing with Aris in January 2005. During his time at Aris, the team participated in two cup finals in 2005 and 2008. In January 2009 he moved on to Atromitos. In 2011, he participated in another Cup final, once again ending up without the trophy. In the summer of 2011, and after 14 years, he returned to AEL. In 2015, at the age of 40, he decided to continue his career at lower league side Achilleas Farsala. In his 3 years with Farsala, the team managed to return to the Gamma Ethniki. In 2018, he joined sixth tier side Dafni Glafkis and thus continued playing football at the age of 44. Staying only until January 2019, Nebegleras joined fourth tier team Atromitos Palamas. At the end of the season, Palamas won the league and thus got promoted to the Gamma Ethniki, for the first time in 17 years. On August 4, 2019, aged 44, it was announced that Nebegleras will continue his career at Iraklis Larissa in the Gamma Ethniki. On 17 June 2020, Nebegleras announced his decision to retire from football, after the expiration of his contract, at the end of the season, wanting to focus on his managerial career.

== International career ==
In 2001, Nebegleras was called up to represent Greece, in a 2–2 friendly against Croatia, resulting in his only cap for the country. In 2004, Greek Olympic team head coach Stratos Apostolakis nominated Nebegleras, as one of three eligible over-aged players, into his squad for the 2004 Summer Olympics. Nebegleras played in all three games for his country, but couldn't help his team qualify for the next round.

== Managerial career ==
On 8 June 2018, Nebegleras was announced as technical director for Football League side Trikala. After only 6 months, Nebegleras and Trikala decided to part ways. On 20 August 2019, Iraklis Larissa announced that Nebegleras, besides playing for the club, will also function as U16 assistant manager. After ending his active playing career, he also left his position as U16 assistant manager. On 27 June 2020, Nebegleras was announced as new manager for fifth tier club Falaniakos. On 14 October 2022, he was announced as new Achilleas Farsala manager. On 4 April 2023, Nebegleras and Achilleas Farsala parted ways. On 2 August 2023, Nebegleras' youth club AEL announced his return to the team as the new U17 manager.

== Honours ==
=== Player ===
Aris

- Greek Cup runner-up: 2004–05, 2007–08

Atromitos

- Greek Cup runner-up: 2010–11

AEL

- Gamma Ethniki: 2013–14
- Gamma Ethniki Cup: 2013–14
- Amateurs' Super Cup: 2013–14

Achilleas Farsala

- Larissa FCA: 2016–17
- Larissa FCA Cup: 2016–17
- Larissa FCA Cup runner-up: 2015–16

Atromitos Palamas

- Karditsa FCA: 2018–19

Iraklis Larissa

- Larissa FCA Supercup: 2019
