= Bracamonte =

Bracamonte may refer to:

== People ==
- Bernardino Meneses y Bracamonte, Count of Peñalba, Spanish nobleman and military leader
- Cecilia Bracamonte (born 1949), Peruvian singer
- Gaspar de Bracamonte, 3rd Count of Peñaranda (1595–1676), Spanish diplomat and statesman
- Héctor Bracamonte (born 1978), Argentinean footballer
- Mariano Bracamonte (born 1999), Argentine footballer
- Walter Bracamonte (born 1997), Argentine footballer

== See also ==
- Bracamontes
- Peñaranda de Bracamonte
- Rubí de Bracamonte
