= Alexandros Galitsios =

Greek footballer

Personal information
- Date of birth: 20 April 1993 (age 33)
- Place of birth: Larissa, Greece
- Height: 1.91 m (6 ft 3 in)
- Position: Centre-back

Team information
- Current team: Iraklis Larissa

Youth career
- 2008–2012: AEL

Senior career*
Years	Team	Apps	(Gls)
2012–2013	AEL	6	(0)
2013–2014	Tyrnavos 2005	3	(0)
2014	Dotieas Agia	0	(0)
2014–2015	PAO Krousonas	0	(0)
2015–2017	Sparta	25	(1)
2017	Trikala	0	(0)
2017–2019	Volos	24	(3)
2019–2020	P.O. Xylotymbou	18	(1)
2020–2021	Kalamata	3	(0)
2021–	Iraklis Larissa	39	(1)

International career
2011	Greece U19	8	(0)
- * Club domestic league appearances and goals as of 17 June 2023

Alexandros Galitsios (Greek: Αλέξανδρος Γκαλίτσιος, born 20 April 1993) is a Greek professional footballer who plays as a centre-back for Super League 2 club Iraklis Larissa.

== Club career ==
Galitsios started playing with the team's youth squad, in June 2008. After having several successful appearances in the U-21 championship, he was promoted to the first team in January 2012, having signed a 4,5-years contract. He made his professional debut on 9 May 2012, against Panthrakikos, under manager Michalis Ziogas.

== International career ==
Galitsios is an active international player for Greece U-17 and U-19 teams. He made his international U-19 debut on 3 September 2011, on a friendly match against Sweden.

== Personal life ==
He is the youngest son of the team's former captain and all-time appearances record holder Giannis Galitsios, and brother of Giorgos Galitsios, who has also played in the team for several years and is now playing for Cypriot club Anorthosis.

== Honours ==
Sparta

- Gamma Ethniki: 2015–16

Volos

- Gamma Ethniki: 2017–18
- Football League: 2018–19
