= Ilias Selionis =

Greek footballer

Personal information
- Full name: Ilias Selionis
- Date of birth: 29 December 1958
- Place of birth: Larissa, Greece
- Date of death: 12 February 2024 (aged 65)
- Place of death: Larissa, Greece
- Height: 1.73 m (5 ft 8 in)
- Position: Defender

Youth career
- 1973–1974: Kissavos Sykourion
- 1974–1976: AEL Amateur

Senior career*
Years	Team	Apps	(Gls)
1976–1981	AEL	80	(1)
1981–1984	OFI		
1984–1985	AO Trikala		
1985–1989	Toxotis Larissa		

International career
1977–1978	Greece U19		
1978–1980	Greece U21		

Managerial career
- 1992–1995: Haravgi
- 1995–1996: Ikaros Neapolis
- 1996–1997: Olympos Larissa
- 2010s–2013: Larissa FCA
- 2013–2017: AEL (team manager & scout)
- * Club domestic league appearances and goals

Ilias Selionis (Greek: Ηλίας Σελιώνης; born 29 December 1958 – 12 February 2024), was a Greek former professional football player who played as a defender.

== Club career ==
Selionis started his career from Kissavos Sykourion before he joined the youth section of AEL in 1974 under Argentinian coach Horacio Moráles. He debuted for AEL's first team on 6 March 1976 against FAS Naoussa in the Greek second division. He moved to OFI in 1981 where he remained until 1984 and subsequently signed for AO Trikala. Selionis then played for Toxotis Larissa in Delta Ethniki and other local Larissa FCA clubs with Omonoia being his last in the early 1990s.
He overall played in Greek first division for 6 years (1978-1984).

== International career ==
Selionis played for Greece U-19 and Greece U-21 a total 15 times in the late 1970s. He was also called up by coach Kostas Polychroniou to feature in the qualification stages of the 1978 UEFA Amateur Cup, alongside Takis Persias, Kostas Maloumidis and others.

== Coaching career ==
After his retirement he coached various local clubs such as Haravgi and Ikaros Neapolis and later he became the longest serving arch-coach and also secretary of the Larissa FCA. He led the Larissa FCA squad to the 2010 PanHellenic final losing out to the 2011 UEFA Regions' Cup representation of Greece after a 4-1 defeat at the Leoforos Alexandras Stadium . In 2013 he took the role of the team manager and youth scout for AEL remaining at his post until 2017.
Selionis was responsible for various OFI's signings of young talents from the Larissa area throughout the years (Ilias Kotsios, Konstantinos Mangos, Pavlos Adamos, Vasilios Koutsianikoulis).

== Death ==
Selionis, known for his pleasant personality, died in Larissa due to illness caused by cancer, at the age of 65.

== Honors ==
- Greek second division: 1978
- Larissa FCA Cup: 1975
