= Ikaros Neapolis =

- Full name: A.O. Ikaros Neapolis
- Founded: 1979
- Location: Neapoli Larissa, Thessaly, Greece
- Colors
- Chairman: (Greece) Giorgos Maltzaris

Ikaros Neapolis (Greek: Α.Ο. Ίκαρος Νεάπολης Λάρισας) is an amateur sports club founded in 1979 in the Neapolis district of Larissa, Thessaly, Greece. The club initially founded only the football department, but in 2013 the basketball department was also established. Greek footballer Ilias Kotsios started his career from the club's youth ranks.

== Football Department ==
Ikaros Neapolis
- Full name: A.O. Ikaros Neapolis
- Founded: 1979
- Dissolved: 2014 (merged)
- Ground: Athletic Center Neapoli Larissa; Larissa, Greece
- Capacity: 500
- League: Larissa FCA
Home colours	Away colours

The club was founded in 1979 and participated in the local championships of Larissa FCA and played their home games at the Athletic Center of Neapoli of a 500 all seated capacity. In 2012, chairman Giorgos Maltzaris agreed Ikaros Neapolis to absorb another local club Olympos Larissa that was in financial turbulence.
In 2014, after of 35 years of continuous presence in the leagues of Larissa Football Clubs Association the football department of Ikaros was merged with Voukefalas Larissa, another team in the district to form A.O. Neapolis, a club that previously existed from 1971 to 1981. Chairman Giorgos Maltzaris had been at the helm of the club since 1994. The first coach of the newly formed club was Dimitris Boukouvalas.

=== Notable football players ===
Greek defender Ilias Kotsios is the most important footballer ever to start his career from Ikaros Neapolis. Kotsios went on to play for Iraklis Larissa, Panathinaikos and OFI Crete F.C.

- (Greece) Ilias Kotsios

=== Notable coaches ===
- (Greece) Kostas Koutsopagos
- (Greece) Ilias Selionis
- (Greece) Antonis Bouchlariotis

== Basketball Department ==
A.O. Ikaros Neapolis
- League: A2 ESKATH League
- Founded: 2013; 13 years ago
- Arena: Agios Thomas Indoor Arena, Neapoli, Larissa
- Capacity: 300
- Location: Larissa, Greece
- Head coach: (North Macedonia) Mirza Kurtovic
- Website: https://www.facebook.com/ikarosneapolisbc/
Home	Away

Ikaros Neapolis basketball department was founded in 2013. It currently participates in ESKATH Leagues, the 5th tier of the Greek basketball pyramid, in Thessaly, Greece maintaining academies for boys and girls.
The club uses the Agios Thomas Indoor Gymnasium in Larissa for its home games. In 2014-15 Ikaros won the ESKATH third tier division title and since the 2015-16 it competes in the A2 ESKATH League.
Ikaros will play in the 2nd Group of A2 ESKATH Thessaly League for the 2020–21 season.

=== Coaches ===
- (North Macedonia) Mirza Kurtovic
- (Greece) Nikos Tsirindanis
- (Greece) Vangelis Koutsokeras

=== Honors ===
- B' ESKATH Thessaly League:
- Winners (1): 2013-2014
