= Konstantinos Kourtesiotis =

Greek footballer

Personal information
- Full name: Konstantinos Kourtesiotis
- Date of birth: 5 June 1984 (age 42)
- Place of birth: Karditsa, Greece
- Height: 1.83 m (6 ft 0 in)
- Position: Left-back

Youth career
- 2003: Anagennisi Karditsa

Senior career*
Years	Team	Apps	(Gls)
2004–2007	Anagennisi Karditsa	42	(3)
2007–2008	Ilisiakos	11	(0)
2008–2011	Anagennisi Karditsa	78	(0)
2011–2013	Platanias	45	(0)
2013–2014	Tyrnavos 2005	20	(3)
2014–2015	AEL	8	(0)
2016	Kissamikos	13	(0)
2016–2017	Doxa Drama	0	(0)
2017–2021	Apollon Larissa	71	(1)
2021	Atromitos Palamas		
2021–2022	Falaniakos		
2022–2024	Achilleas Farsala		
- * Club domestic league appearances and goals

Konstantinos Kourtesiotis (Greek: Κωνσταντίνος Κουρτεσιώτης; born 5 June 1984) is a Greek former professional footballer who played as a left-back.

== Career ==
Kourtesiotis was born in Karditsa, and has previously played for his hometown team Anagennisi. He has also played for Ilisiakos, Tyrnavos 2005, and for the Cretan Super League club Platanias. He signed for AEL on 17 July 2014.
