= Giannis Mangos =

Greek footballer (born 1982)

Personal information
- Date of birth: 26 July 1982 (age 44)
- Place of birth: Karditsa, Greece
- Position: Midfielder

Senior career*
Years	Team	Apps	(Gls)
2001–2005	Proodeftiki		
2005–2007	Anagennisi Karditsa	34	(0)

Managerial career
- 2015–2016: Dotieas Agia
- 2016–2017: Anagennisi Karditsa
- 2017–2019: Ierapetra
- 2020: PO Triglia
- 2020: Apollon Larissa
- 2021: Karaiskakis
- 2022: Fostiras
- 2022: Proodeftiki
- 2023: Fostiras
- 2024–2025: Atromitos Palama
- 2025: Anthoupoli Larissa
- 2025: Sarakinos Volos
- * Club domestic league appearances and goals

Giannis Mangos (Greek: Γιάννης Μάγγος; born 26 July 1982) is a Greek professional football manager and former player.
