= Apostolos Koulpas =

Greek footballer

Personal information
- Date of birth: 23 February 1996 (age 30)
- Place of birth: Greece
- Position: Centre-back

Team information
- Current team: Iraklis Larissa

Senior career*
Years	Team	Apps	(Gls)
2013–2014	Achilleas Domokos	8	(1)
2014–2015	Kypseli		
2015–2016	Paschalitsa Karditsa		
2016–2017	Doxa Argyropouli		
2017–2018	Achilleas Farsala	23	(0)
2018–2019	Trikala	9	(0)
2019–2020	Apollon Larissa	1	(0)
2020–2021	AO Sellana		
2021–	Iraklis Larissa	0	(0)
- * Club domestic league appearances and goals as of 28 July 2021

Apostolos Koulpas (Greek: Απόστολος Κούλπας; born 23 February 1996) is a Greek professional footballer who plays as a centre-back for Gamma Ethniki club Iraklis Larissa.
