= Konstantinos Mangos =

Greek footballer (born in 1976)

Personal information
- Date of birth: 18 November 1976 (age 49)
- Place of birth: Larissa, Greece

Youth career
- 1990–1995: Haravgi Larissa

Senior career*
Years	Team	Apps	(Gls)
1995–1999	OFI		
1999–2000	Ialysos		
2000–2002	AEL		
2002–2004	Proodeftiki		
2004–2005	Ionikos		
2005–2006	PAS Giannina		
2007	Vyzas		
2008	Olympiacos Volos		
2008–2009	Pierikos		
2009–2011	Tyrnavos		
2011–2012	Pyrgetos		
2013–2014	Haravgi Larissa		

Managerial career
- 2012–2013: Dotieas Agias
- * Club domestic league appearances and goals

Konstantinos Mangos (Greek: Κωνσταντίνος Μάγγος; born 18 November 1976) is a retired Greek football midfielder.

== Career ==
Mangos started his career from Haravgi Larissa under coach Ilias Selionis. In 1995 he was signed by top-flight Greek club OFI, Selionis' former team. He stayed with OFI coach by Eugène Gerards for four seasons and also played in the UEFA Cup in 1997-98. In 2000 Mangos returned to his hometown Larissa playing for 1988 Greek champion AEL and taking legendary jersey no.10 (worn by Vassilis Karapialis in the past). After a two-year stint with AEL in the second division he played for Piraeus rivals Proodeftiki and Ionikos, In 2013 he joined his first club Haravgi Larissa to end his career.
