= Manolis Bertos =

Greek professional footballer

Personal information
- Full name: Emmanouil Bertos
- Date of birth: 13 May 1989 (age 37)
- Place of birth: Xanthi, Greece
- Height: 1.82 m (5 ft 11 1/2 in)
- Position: Right-back

Team information
- Current team: Atromitos Palamas

Senior career*
Years	Team	Apps	(Gls)
2008–2015	Xanthi	115	(1)
2015–2018	Olympiacos	0	(0)
2015–2016	→ Xanthi (loan)	23	(0)
2016–2018	→ Asteras Tripolis (loan)	31	(1)
2018–2022	AEL	84	(2)
2022–2023	Pyli Kos	7	(0)
2026–	Atromitos Palamas		
- * Club domestic league appearances and goals as of 22:00, 25 May 2022 (UTC)

Manolis Bertos (Greek: Μανώλης Μπέρτος; born 13 May 1989) is a Greek professional footballer who plays as a right-back for Atromitos Palamas.

== Career ==
Manolis Bertos played all his professional career in Skoda Xanthi. During the seven years he had 131 appearances in all competitions. He was among the starting XI in the final of the 2014–15 Greek Football Cup where his club lost 3–1 from Olympiacos.

On 8 August 2015, he signed a three years' contract with Greek giants Olympiacos. It remains to be seen whether Bertos will join Olympiacos for the 2015–16 season, or if he will stay on loan for another year in his former club Skoda Xanthi. The first scenario would probably activated if Omar Elabdellaoui will sign to Benfica. Eventually he did not manage to earn the confidence of Olympiacos coach, he signed a two years' contract with Asteras Tripolis, leaving the champions without earning a single appearance.

On 7 September 2018, he joined AEL, on a two-year contract.

On 27 June 2020, Bertos signed a two-year contract renewal.

== Career statistics ==
=== Club ===
As of 6 October 2021

Club	Season	League			Cup		Continental		Other		Total	
Club	Season	Division	Apps	Goals	Apps	Goals	Apps	Goals	Apps	Goals	Apps	Goals
Skoda Xanthi	2007–08	Super League Greece	2	0	0	0	—		—		2	0
Skoda Xanthi	2008–09	Super League Greece	2	0	0	0	—		—		2	0
Skoda Xanthi	2009–10	Super League Greece	6	1	1	0	—		—		7	1
Skoda Xanthi	2010–11	Super League Greece	21	0	0	0	—		—		21	0
Skoda Xanthi	2011–12	Super League Greece	26	0	2	0	—		—		28	0
Skoda Xanthi	2012–13	Super League Greece	17	0	3	0	—		—		20	0
Skoda Xanthi	2013–14	Super League Greece	21	0	1	0	2	0	—		24	0
Skoda Xanthi	2014–15	Super League Greece	20	0	7	0	—		—		27	0
Skoda Xanthi	Total		115	1	14	0	2	0	—		131	1
Skoda Xanthi (loan)	2015–16	Super League Greece	23	0	1	0	—		—		24	0
Asteras Tripolis	2016–17	Super League Greece	21	1	4	0	—		—		25	1
Asteras Tripolis	2017–18	Super League Greece	10	0	2	0	—		—		12	0
Asteras Tripolis	Total		31	1	6	0	—		—		37	1
AEL	2018–19	Super League Greece	8	1	1	0	—		—		9	1
AEL	2019–20	Super League Greece	23	1	1	0	—		—		24	1
AEL	2020–21	Super League Greece	27	0	1	0	—		—		28	0
AEL	2021–22	Super League Greece 2	17	0	3	0	—		—		20	0
AEL	Total		75	2	6	0	—		—		63	2
Career total			243	4	27	0	2	0	0	0	273	4
