= Machitis Terpsithea F.C. =

Machitis Terpsithea
- Full name: Athlitikos Omilos Machitis Terpsithea
- Founded: 1971
- Ground: Terpsithea Ground, Larissa, Greece
- Chairman: Makis Alexoudis
- Manager: Vangelis Gagos
- League: Larissa FCA Second Division
- 2025–26: Larissa FCA Second Division (Group 1), 4th
Home colours	Away colours

Machitis Terpsithea F.C. is a Greek football club, based in Terpsithea, Larissa.

== History ==
The club was officially founded in 1971. However it has existed since 1952.
In 1980-81 it gained its first promotion and in 2012 the club won the annual Koukoulitsios-Mousiaris tournament for first time. In 2013 Machitis won promotion to the Greek third tier through the play-off round. Under coach Stavrotheodoros Nikos the club played in Football League 2 for the first time in the 2013-14, finishing 9th in the Group 3 and relegated. During that season the club used the Iraklis Larissa's Neapolis Stadium for its home matches.
Machitis is known for its professional standards after renovating the Terpithea Ground in 2021, signing experienced players and releasing every year illustrated sticker albums with its players, staff and the club's season schedule. Vangelis Gagos was elected chairman in 2021 for a second stint.

Several former AE Larissa players with seasons in the Greek Beta Ethniki and Gamma Ethniki have played for Machitis, such as Alexandros Kakazoukis, Theodoros Molas, Vasilis Floros, Vasilis Tachtintis, Ilir Lilolari, Alexis Nikoulis, Giorgos Kaffes (Greek champion with Panathinaikos), Antonis Perifanos and others.

=== Notable players ===
- (Greece) Georgios Kaffes
- (Greece) Alexandros Kakazoukis
- (Greece) Theodoros Molas
- (Greece) Tolis Tartaboukas
- (Greece) Vasilis Floros
- (Greece) Vasilis Tachtintis

=== Notable coaches ===
- (Greece) Stavrotheodoros Nikolaos
- (Greece) Vangelis Birsimis
- (Greece) Emanouil Theodoros

=== Chairmen ===
- (Greece) Pararsenos Achilleas
- (Greece) Kyritsakos Vaios
- (Greece) Vangelis Gagos

== Honours ==
- Larissa FCA Championship:

- Winners (1): 2012-13

- Larissa Super Cup

- Winners (1): 2013

- Koukoulitsios-Mousiaris Tournament

- Winners (1): 2012

- Larissa FCA Championship B Division:

- Winners (1): 1999-00, 2010-11 (as A1)

- Larissa FCA Championship C Division:

- Winners (1): 2021-22

== Sources ==
- Club history
