= AEL FC =

AEL FC may refer to:

- Athlitiki Enosi Larissa F.C., Greek football club
  - AEL FC Arena
- AEK Larnaca FC, Cypriot football club
- AEL Limassol, Cypriot football club
- AEL Kalloni F.C., Greek football club
