= Haido =

Haido may refer to:

- Haito, a 9th-century Christian monk and Bishop of Basel
- Haido, a township in Xiapu County, Ningde, Fujian, People's Republic of China
- Haido, a character in the anime film Naruto the Movie: Legend of the Stone of Gelel

== People with the given name ==
- Haido Alexouli (born 1991), Greek long jumper
