= Walter Bracamonte =

Argentine footballer

Personal information
- Full name: Walter Germán Bracamonte
- Date of birth: 22 July 1997 (age 29)
- Place of birth: Villa Allende, Argentina
- Height: 1.75 m (5 ft 9 in)
- Position: Winger

Team information
- Current team: Juventud Antoniana

Youth career
- Unión-SF

Senior career*
Years	Team	Apps	(Gls)
2016–2021	Unión-SF	11	(0)
2019–2020	→ Alvarado (loan)	7	(1)
2021	Asteras Vlachioti	16	(1)
2021	Aetos Makrychori	3	(1)
2022	Iraklis Larissa	6	(0)
2022	Las Parejas	12	(0)
2023–	Juventud Antoniana	3	(0)
- * Club domestic league appearances and goals as of 15:53, 4 June 2023 (UTC)

Walter Germán Bracamonte (born 22 July 1997) is an Argentine footballer who plays as a winger for Juventud Antoniana.

== Career ==
=== Club career ===
After spells at Unión Santa Fe and Alvarado in Argentina, Bracamonte joined Greek club Asteras Vlachioti on 15 January 2021. In October 2021, Bracamonte moved to Gamma Ethniki club Aetos Makrychori. In January 2022, he joined fellow league club Iraklis Larissa.
