= Konstantinos Theodoropoulos =

Greek footballer

Personal information
- Date of birth: 27 March 1990 (age 36)
- Place of birth: Larissa, Greece
- Height: 1.98 m (6 ft 6 in)
- Position: Goalkeeper

Team information
- Current team: Anagennisi Karditsa
- Number: 21

Youth career
- –2009: Toxotis Larissa

Senior career*
Years	Team	Apps	(Gls)
2009–2011	Ionikos	25	(0)
2011–2012	Doxa Drama	0	(0)
2012–2013	Oikonomos Tsaritsani	6	(0)
2013–2014	Chania	25	(0)
2014–2016	Asteras Tripolis	16	(0)
2016–2017	Panionios	0	(0)
2017–2018	AEL	12	(0)
2018–2019	Apollon Pontus	20	(0)
2019–2021	Lamia	21	(0)
2021–2024	AEL	41	(0)
2024–	Anagennisi Karditsa	2	(0)
- * Club domestic league appearances and goals as of 21:00, 28 September 2025 (UTC)

Konstantinos Theodoropoulos (Greek: Κωνσταντίνος Θεοδωρόπουλος; born 27 March 1990) is a Greek professional footballer who plays as a goalkeeper for Super League 2 club Anagennisi Karditsa.

== Career ==
=== Early years ===
He started his career from the youth section of Toxotis Larissa until 2009.

=== Ionikos and Doxa Dramas ===
His first big career step was with Piraeus club Ionikos and later with Doxa Dramas. In 2017 he signed for AEL.

=== Return to AEL ===
On 1 July 2021, AEL announced his return to the club.

== Career statistics ==
As of 30 April 2017

Club	Season	League	League		Cup		Continental (Note: Includes UEFA Europa League qualifying rounds)		Other (Note: Includes Football League playoffs and Super League play-offs)		Total	
Club	Season	League	Apps	Goals	Apps	Goals	Apps	Goals	Apps	Goals	Apps	Goals
Ionikos	2009–10	Beta Ethniki	1	0	0	0	–		–		1	0
Ionikos	2010–11	Football League	24	0	0	0	–		–		24	0
Ionikos	Total		25	0	0	0	–		–		25	0
Doxa Drama	2011–12	Super League Greece	0	0	0	0	–		–		0	0
Doxa Drama	Total		0	0	0	0	–		–		0	0
Oikonomos	2012–13	Football League 2	6	0	1	0	–		–		7	0
Oikonomos	Total		6	0	1	0	–		–		7	0
Chania	2013–14	Football League	25	0	3	0	–		10	0	38	0
Chania	Total		25	0	3	0	–		10	0	38	0
Asteras Tripolis	2014–15	Super League Greece	13	0	4	0	5	0	5	0	27	0
Asteras Tripolis	2015–16	Super League Greece	3	0	7	0	5	0	–		15	0
Asteras Tripolis	Total		16	0	11	0	10	0	5	0	42	0
Panionios	2016–17	Super League Greece	0	0	1	0	–		–		1	0
Panionios	Total		0	0	1	0	–		–		1	0
AEL	2016–17	Super League Greece	9	0	0	0	–		–		9	0
AEL	Total		9	0	0	0	–		–		9	0
Career Total			81	0	16	0	10	0	15	0	122	0
