= Christos Veletanis =

Greek footballer

Personal information
- Full name: Christos Vasilios Veletanis
- Date of birth: 12 June 1976 (age 50)
- Place of birth: Larissa, Greece
- Height: 1.75 m (5 ft 9 in)
- Position: Midfielder

Senior career*
Years	Team	Apps	(Gls)
1995–1997	AEL		
1997	Tyrnavos		
1997–2000	Apollon Larissa		
2000–2005	Olympiacos Volos		
2005	Levadiakos		
2006	Olympiacos Volos		
2006–2007	Ayia Napa		
2007–2008	Eordaikos		
2008–2010	Pyrgetos		
2010–2011	Pierikos		
2011	St Mirren		
2012	Megas Alexandros Irakleia		
2012–2013	Orfeas		
2013–2014	FC PoPa		
2016	Oikonomos Tsaritsani		
- * Club domestic league appearances and goals

Christos Veletanis (Greek: Χρήστος Βελετάνης; born 12 June 1976) is a retired Greek football midfielder.
