= Thanasis Papageorgiou =

Greek footballer

Personal information
- Full name: Athanasios Papageorgiou
- Date of birth: 9 May 1987 (age 39)
- Place of birth: Larissa, Greece
- Height: 1.83 m (6 ft 0 in)
- Positions: Right back; centre back

Team information
- Current team: Anagennisi Karditsa
- Number: 22

Youth career
- 2004–2006: Iraklis Halki

Senior career*
Years	Team	Apps	(Gls)
2006–2011	Atromitos	1	(0)
2007	→ Ethnikos Piraeus (loan)	12	(0)
2007–2008	→ Rodos (loan)	31	(0)
2009–2010	→ Panargiakos (loan)	22	(4)
2010–2011	→ Pierikos (loan)	29	(1)
2011–2013	AEL	63	(2)
2013–2016	Panthrakikos	59	(1)
2016–2017	Xanthi	5	(0)
2017–2020	Panionios	67	(1)
2020–2021	Kalamata	0	(0)
2021	Ionikos	20	(0)
2021–2026	AEL	103	(2)
2026–	Anagennisi Karditsa	0	(0)

International career
2005	Greece U19	1	(0)
- * Club domestic league appearances and goals as of 14 June 2026

Thanasis Papageorgiou (Greek: Θανάσης Παπαγεωργίου; born 9 May 1987) is a Greek professional footballer who plays as a right back for Super League 2 club Anagennisi Karditsa.
