= Ampeloniakos F.C. =

Greek football club

Ampeloniakos
- Full name: Athlitikos Omilos Ampeloniakos
- Founded: 1953; 73 years ago
- Ground: Ampelonas Stadium; Ampelonas, Larissa, Greece
- Chairman: Christos Bakoulas
- Manager: Andreas Chatziliontas
- League: Larissa FCA Second Division
- 2025–26: Larissa FCA Third Division (Group 1), 1st (promoted)
Home colours	Away colours

Athlitikos Omilos Ampeloniakos (Greek: Αθλητικός Όμιλος Αμπελωνιακός) is a Greek football club, based in Ampelonas, Larissa.

== History ==
AO Ampeloniakos was founded in 1953 in Ampelonas, Larissa, through the merger of two unofficial local teams, Olympos and Ampeloniakos. In 1981–82 they won promotion to Delta Ethniki, an achievement repeated in 1992–93 and 2010–11. Ampeloniakos played in the third-tier Gamma Ethniki in 2013–14 and returned there after one season. The club currently competes in the Larissa FCA in the 2026–27 season.
Greece former international Giannis Goumas is the most successful player the club ever produced.

== Honours ==
- Larissa FCA Championship:

- Winners (2): 2010–11, 2014–15
- Runners-up (2): 1978–79, 1981–82

- Larissa FCA Cup

- Winners (2): 2013, 2015
- Runners-up (2): 1994, 2008

- Larissa FCA Super Cup

- Winners (1): 2011

== Notable players ==
- (Greece) Giannis Goumas
- (Greece) Giannis Gkampetas
- (Greece) (Albania) Bledi Muca
- (Greece) Vangelis Kousieras
- (Greece) Andreas Chatziliontas
- (Greece) (Serbia) Sasha Jelovac
- (Greece) Giannis Kokkinos
- (Greece) (United States) Christopher Mankini
- (Greece) Thanasis Palaskas

== Notable coaches ==
- (Greece) Dimitrios Kapetanopoulos
- (Greece) Takis Parafestas
- (Greece) Giannis Alexoulis
- (Greece) Giannis Gkampetas
- (Greece) Nikos Kakanoulias
