= Anthoupoli Larissa F.C. =

Greek football club

Anthoupoli Larissa
- Full name: Αθλητικός Όμιλος Ανθούπολη (Athletic Club of Anthoupoli)
- Founded: 1969; 57 years ago
- Ground: Municipal Stadium Neapoli; Larissa, Greece
- Capacity: 400
- Chairman: Christos Priftis
- Manager: Giannis Tsakmakidis
- League: Gamma Ethniki
- 2025–26: Gamma Ethniki (Group 3), 10th
- Website: Official website
Home colours	Away colours

Anthoupoli Larissa F.C. (Greek: Αθλητικός Όμιλος Ανθουπόλεως), is a Greek football club, based in Larissa. The colours of the team are burgundy and white. Anthoupoli was the first team from the Larissa Football Clubs Association to play in the Greek Football Amateur Cup final in 1977 and it is the team where former Greece striker Giannis Valaoras started his career from.

== History ==
Anthoupoli was founded in 1969 starting from the B Division of the Larissa FCA and they finished as champions of the second group winning promotion to B Division in 1970. They soon won another promotion to the A Division and they won the Larissa League in 1975, which at the time was the fourth tier of the Greek football pyramid. In 1977 and 1978 Anthoupoli, under the guidance of coach Pavlos Grigoriadis reached the Larissa Cup final against experienced Achilleas Farsala winning the trophy on the first occasion.

In that season 1976–77, Anthoupoli Larissa had an amazing run: they won the Larissa League, the Cup and they also reached the Greek Football Amateur Cup but they did not manage to complete a treble as they were defeated by A.O. Karditsa in Volos Municipal Stadium. The next summer in 1978, their top scorer Giannis Valaoras would sign for AEL where he spent 14 years with the club winning the 1985 Greek Cup and the 1988 Greek Championship.

Two years later, Anthoupoli would be Larissa FCA champions once again, a success they repeated in 1994 under their long-serving chairman Vassilis Adamopoulos, winning promotion to Delta Ethniki, the fourth national division, where they stayed for just one year. They maintained a powerful side in the late 1990s fighting for their promotion to Delta Ethniki and developed a strong relationship with one of the professional football clubs of the Larissa town, AEL which had as result in a few young players of Anthoupoli joining the latter, such as Stelios Tsiantoulis, Apostolos Tsianakas, Christos Gkikoudis and Vasilis Tahtintis. Since the turn of the century the club has struggled in the lower divisions of Larissa FCA.

In July 2022, local businessman Christos Priftis was elected to replace long-servingpresident Vassilis Adamopoulos with an aim to bring Anthoupoli back to the national divisions. As a result Michalis Ziogas who had coached second division club AEL in the 2021–22 season signed for the club replacing Vaios Karaferis, a surprise move followed by the arrival of experienced midfielder Bledi Muca.

In 2023, Anthoupoli won the Larissa FCA Second Division championship, earning promotion back to the Larissa FCA First Division after several years. In 2024, the club also won the Larissa FCA First Division championship, qualifying for the promotion play-offs for the Gamma Ethniki.

=== Notable players ===
- (Greece) Giannis Valaoras
- (Greece) Apostolos Tsianakas
- (Greece) Giannis Vasiliou
- (Greece) Stelios Tsiantoulis
- (Greece) Christos Gkikoudis
- (Greece) Vassilis Tahtintis
- (Albania) (Greece) Bledi Muca
- (Greece) Giannis Golantas
- (Greece) Alekos Kouvelas

=== Notable managers ===
- (Greece) Giorgos Kamakas
- (Greece) Pavlos Grigoriadis
- (Greece) Lakis Pagarliotas
- (Greece) Vaios Karaferis
- (Greece) Michalis Ziogas
- (Greece) Christos Chatziliadis
- (Greece) Zisis Ziagas
- (Greece) Konstantinos Nebegleras

=== Notable chairmen ===
- (Greece) Vassilis Adamopoulos
- (Greece) Christos Priftis

== Ground ==
Anthoupoli Larissa use the Anthoupoli ground which is located in the Anthoupoli district in Larissa for their home games. The ground did not have grass in its first years and until 2000. The football pitch is part of the Anthoupoli training complex, that includes basketball and tennis courts and it belongs to the municipality of Larissa.

== Rivalries ==
Anthoupoli used to share their ground with another local team Haravgi Larissa who they developed a great rivalry with in the 1980s and 1990s. Though the two clubs mostly competed in different divisions on the several occasions they would meet, due to the vicinity of the two districts the matches would consider as local derbies attracting the local fans in.

In recent years a rivalry between Anthoupoli and Larissa '88 has been established ever since Larissa '88 moved to the Anthoupoli ground.

== Honours ==
- Larissa FCA Championship:

- Winners (5): 1974–75, 1976–77, 1979–80, 1993–94, 2023–24

- Larissa FCA Cup

- Winners (2): 1973–74, 1976–77
- Runners-up (1): 1977–78

- Greek Football Amateur Cup

- Runners-up (1): 1977

=== Classification in Delta Ethniki ===
Season	Classification	Group
1994–95	18th	Group 6
