= Bernice Wilson =

British sprinter (born 1984)

Personal information
- Nationality: British
- Born: 21 April 1984 (age 42)

Sport
- Sport: Women's Athletics
- Event(s): 60 metres, 100 metres, 200 metres
- Club: Birchfield Harriers

Achievements and titles
- Personal best(s): 60m 7.25 (Sheffield 2011); 100 m 11.57 (Bedford 2011); 200 m 23.77 (Eton 2010)

Bernice Wilson (born 21 April 1984) is a former British sprinter who represented her country at the 2011 European Athletics Indoor Championships and served two bans from track and field athletics for anti-doping violations.

== Biography ==
An English Schools 200 metres finalist in 1997, Wilson went on to reach numerous finals at age group, regional and national level before making her big senior break-through by coming second in the 60 metres at the 2010 British Indoor Athletics Championships.

Wilson set a new personal best time of 7.25secs when she finished runner-up to Jodie Williams in the 60 metres at the 2011 British Indoor Athletics Championships in Sheffield on 12 February 2011 leading to her selection for the following month's European Athletics Indoor Championships in Paris, France. There she made it through the heats but finished fifth in her semi-final running a time of 7.28 and therefore missing out on a place in the final.

In July 2011 it was announced Wilson had been provisionally suspended from competition having failed an anti-doping test after the banned substances anabolic steroid testosterone and Clenbuterol were found in a urine sample she provided at the Bedford International Games on June 12. The athlete blamed a contaminated sample but she was subsequently given a four-year ban from athletics.

While still banned in February 2015, she failed an out-of-competition test for another banned substance, the fertility drug clomiphene, but due to the substantial assistance she provided to UK Anti-Doping (UKAD) and a prompt admission of guilt, her second suspension was reduced from 40 months to 10 months. It was later revealed that Wilson's coach and then boyfriend, George Skafidas, had been giving her the clomiphene without her knowledge by replacing her vitamin tablets with the drugs. In 2016 Skafidas was given a lifetime ban from athletics after admitting nine anti-doping rule violations.

Wilson is now part of the UKAD Athlete Commission seeking to help others avoid the pitfalls into which she fell.

== See also ==
- List of doping cases in sport
- List of doping cases in athletics
