= Michalis Ziogas =

Greek footballer

Personal information
- Full name: Michail Ziogas
- Date of birth: 27 June 1962 (age 64)
- Place of birth: Larissa, Greece
- Height: 1.80 m (5 ft 11 in)
- Position: Centre forward

Senior career*
Years	Team	Apps	(Gls)
1982–1989	AEL	271	(92)
1989–1990	Levadiakos	32	(18)
1990–1992	Aris	38	(8)
1992–1993	Ionikos	19	(5)
1993–1994	Olympiacos Volos	?	(?)
1994–1995	AO Velissarios FC	?	(?)
1995–1996	AE Tyrnavos	?	(?)
Total		360	(123)

International career
1986–1988	Greece	3	(0)

Managerial career
- 1997–1998: Kalamata (assistant)
- 2001: Apollon Larissa
- 2004–2006: Olympiacos Volos
- 2008–2011: Tyrnavos 2005
- 2012–2013: AEL
- 2014: Pierikos
- 2015–2016: Apollon Larissa
- 2016–2017: Pierikos
- 2017: Olympiacos Volos
- 2017–2018: Karitsa
- 2018: Pierikos
- 2018–2019: Diagoras Stefanovikeio
- 2019–2020: Karitsa
- 2020: Apollon Makrychori
- 2020–2021: Anagennisi Karditsa
- 2021: AEL (caretaker)
- 2021: AEL (assistant)
- 2022: AEL (caretaker)
- 2022: Anthoupoli
- 2024: Anthoupoli
- 2025: Atromitos Palama
- * Club domestic league appearances and goals

Michalis Ziogas (Greek: Μιχάλης Ζιώγας; born 27 June 1962) is a Greek former professional footballer who played as a centre forward. He played for AEL from 1982 to 1989 being one of the greatest players the club ever had. He was the team's head coach from 20 March 2012, until his dismissal on 8 January 2013.

== International career ==
Ziogas appeared in three matches for the senior Greece national football team from 1986 to 1988.

== Honours ==
AEL

- Greek Championship: 1987–88
- Greek Cup: 1984―85
