= Takis Parafestas =

Greek footballer

Personal information
- Full name: Dimitrios Parafestas
- Date of birth: 16 August 1953 (age 73)
- Place of birth: Larissa, Greece
- Height: 1.78 m (5 ft 10 in)
- Position: Defender

Senior career*
Years	Team	Apps	(Gls)
1968–1978	Falaniakos		
1978–1987	AEL	246	(4)
1987–1988	Trikala		

International career
1984	Greece	1	(0)

Managerial career
- 2000: AEL
- 2003–2004: AEL
- 2004–2005: Apollon Larissa
- 2006–2007: Iraklis Sofades
- 2008: Rigas Feraios
- 2010–2012: Ampeloniakos
- 2012–2014: Falaniakos
- 2014: Iraklis Larissa
- 2014–2015: Ampeloniakos
- 2015–2017: Achilleas Farsala
- 2017: Tyrnavos 2005
- 2017–2018: Achilleas Farsala
- 2019–2021: Atromitos Palamas
- 2021: AEL (team manager)
- 2022–2024: Falaniakos
- * Club domestic league appearances and goals

Dimitrios "Takis" Parafestas (Greek: Δημήτριος "Τάκης" Παραφέστας; born 16 August 1953) is a Greek former football defender. He started his career with Falaniakos and spent the majority of it with AEL in the Super League Greece.

== International career ==
Parafestas appeared in one match for the senior Greece national football team, a friendly against East Germany on 15 February 1984. In 2003, when Larissa were playing in Third Division and were in the relegation zone, Parafestas was appointed manager of the club. He managed to save the club from relegation in the last match of the season after taking a point at Chania in a 3–3 draw against the local club AE Chania. The following season, he managed to promote the club to Football League (Greece) and then he resigned.
