= George Skafidas =

Greek sports coach

- Born: 7 March 1971 (age 54) (Larissa, Greece)
- Occupations: Former middle-distance runner, sports Coach
- Years active: 1991-present (coach)

George Skafidas (born Georgios Skafidas, (Greek: Γεώργιος Σκαφιδάς; 7 March 1971) is a former middle-distance runner and currently an athletics and multi-sport coach.

== Career ==
=== Early years and 2004 Summer Olympics ===
Skafidas started his athletics career as a middle-distance runner from club Pelasgos in the early 1980s, while also being a football player for Haravgi Larissa. After becoming an athletics coach in 1991 he continued competing as a middle-distance runner for several years. During the 1990s and early 2000s he was hired by the Hellenic Athletics Federation and trained athletes in preparation for the 2004 Athens Olympics and also cooperated with many Greek basketball, volleyball, and football players. With Greece winning a country-record of 16 medals, Skafidas accepted the British Athletics Federation's offer to become a chief trainer and moved to the United Kingdom in 2004.

=== UK Anti-Doping ban ===
On 12 June 2011, GB sprinter Bernice Wilson, whom Skafidas was coaching tested positive following an in-competition test at the Bedford International Games. Skafidas was accused by Wilson that he had administered testosterone and other prohibited substances to her. As a result Bernice Wilson was banned from all sport for four years, on 13 September 2011.

On 28 August 2013, the British federation banned him from holding any UKA license for five years after former GB sprinter Bernice Wilson who he was coaching was banned for a drugs offence violating the anti-doping rule. Two years later, on 23 November 2015, Skafidas was provisionally suspended by Britain's governing body in a decision issued by UK Anti-Doping (UKAD) and in accordance with IAAF Anti-Doping Rules.

On 16 March 2016, he eventually received a lifetime ban from all sport following nine Anti-Doping Rule Violations, all related to his conduct with international sprinter Bernice Wilson, as it was confirmed by UK Anti-Doping.

=== Recent years ===
In the summer of 2016 he was hired as a trainer by revived Greek basketball club Gymnastikos, Vassilis Spanoulis' first ever team. He had coached Olympic-Nees Karyes FC the previous season.
In 2020 he joined ambitious fourth-tier football club Pyrros as a trainer while his efforts to reactivate his former football club Haravgi Larissa were met with success. He was elected club president in 2021 and also joined the team as a player and coaching supervisor.
Skafidas also helped the 1970s founded Federation of International Subbuteo Associations come back to life and become part of the FISTF (Federation of International Sports Table Football) a couple years ago, being one of its leading members. His field of expertise is biomechanics, physiology and sports periodization and he also works as a physical education school teacher and University sports lecturer. He is also one of the oldest active players in Greek football and was considered one of the best Greek performance coaches of the 1990s and 2000s.
