= Fotis Gouziotis =

Greek footballer

Personal information
- Date of birth: 11 November 1974 (age 51)
- Place of birth: Larissa, Greece
- Position: Defender

Senior career*
Years	Team	Apps	(Gls)
–1995	Toxotis Larissa		
1995–2000	AEL		
2000–2003	Panachaiki		
2003–2004	Poseidon Neon Poron		
2004–2005	Paniliakos		
2005	PAS Giannina		
2006	Trikala		
2006–2007	Panargiakos		
2007–2008	AER Afantou		
2008–2098	Alimos		
2009–2010	Patouchas		
- * Club domestic league appearances and goals

Fotis Gouziotis (Greek: Φώτης Γκουζιώτης; born 11 November 1974) is a retired Greek football defender.

== Career ==
Gouziotis started his career his Toxotis Larissa before signing for former Greek champions, AEL, in Alpha Ethniki in 1995. In 2000, he moved to Panachaiki where he stayed for 3 seasons. In 2003, ambitious club Poseidon Neon Poron followed in 2003 and then he became a journeyman for various Greek teams until hanging up his boots in 2010.
