= Larisaikos F.C. =

- Full name: Larisaikos Football Club
- Founded: 1930; 96 years ago as Larisaikos A.F.C.
- Dissolved: 1964 (refounded 1969/officially in 1976 as Larisaikos F.C.)
- Ground: Viologiko Ground, Nea Smirni, Larissa, Thessaly, Greece
- Chairman: Christos Gatos
- Manager: Theodoros Georgoulas
- League: Larissa FCA Second Division
- 2025–26: Larissa FCA Second Division (Group 1), 3rd
Home colours	Away colours

Larisaikos F.C. (Greek: Ο Λαρισαϊκός ή Αθλητικός Ποδοσφαιρικός Όμιλος Λάρισας "Λαρισαϊκός") is football club from the Greek town of Larissa, and it was founded in 1930. Larisaikos was one of the first football clubs of Thessaly to participate in the first competitions organised by Thessaly Football Clubs Association. The foundation of Larissa Football Clubs Association in 1960 saw the club participation in the new football league which at the time was equivalent to the third tier of the Greek football federation. In 1964 Larisaikos was merged with Iraklis Larissa, Toxotis Larissa and Aris Larissa to form the new club AEL.

== History ==
Larisaikos F.C. was founded in 1930, by Achilles Karanasios. in the Larissa district of Souflaria (today knows as Agioi Saranta). The precursor club which was replaced by Larisaikos was called Athina. Larisaikos' first official matches took place during the 1932–33 season in the Cup of the Cities under the umbrella of Thessaly Football Clubs Association. The club was inactive from 1933 until 1938 returning to action just two years before Greece entered the WW II. After the World War II the club resumed its operations once more and started participating again in the Thessaly Football Clubs Association leagues.

The Greens were the last champion of the Larissa League in 1959–60, before the creation of the Larissa Football Clubs Association at the end of that season. They also qualified to the Beta Ethniki in the 1959–60, which was the second tier of Greek football finishing in the penultimate position of the table against more experienced teams like Niki Volos and Fostiras. Larisaikos finished 8th the next season in Beta Ethniki with local rivals Niki Volos winning the group.
In 1961-62 Larisaikos won the Larissa Football League and secure promotion to Beta Ethniki who was restructured, missing out on promotion to Greek first division in the play-off games at the end of the season. In that year Pierikos was the team that eventually won promotion to Alpha Ethniki.Next season the team had a satisfactory run in a difficult group and finish six points behind almighty group winner Edessaikos.
In 1964, Larisaikos was finally relegated from Beta Ethniki and subsequently was merged, ceasing operations after 34 years. The last chairman of the club was Thanassis Kourtis.

=== Classification in Beta Ethniki ===
1959-60	7th (Group Central)
1960-61	8th (Group Central)
1961-62	1st (Group 5) and then 5th (Final Group)
1962-63	7th (Group 4)
1963-64	13d (Group 4)

=== Larisaikos as part of the new club: AEL ===
In May/June 1964 Larisaikos participated in the new club AEL Larissa F.C with a plenty of its players. These were the following: Lakis Delizonas, Giorgos Kyriakos, Vassilis Kyriakos, Dimitris Zampas, Mihalis Karelias (new club's captain 1964–70), Hatzidis, Papakonstantinou, Kyriakidis, Giatsios, Gialamas, all footballers who had played in the Greek second division. After that it was merged with another local club called Pelasgikos Nea Smirni (founded in 1958) to re-activate A.O. Pelasgiotis, a club existing until today with its football, basketball and volleyball departments.

=== 1969: Larisaikos was refounded ===
In the late 60's a new club was founded again under the name A.O. Larisaikos and subsequently won promotion just 6 years after its dissolution. However, as it states in its emblem the official year of the "re-establishment" is 1976, and the new club is considered the continuation of the original club. In 1984 Larisaikos won the first division of Larissa Football Clubs Association after beating old rivals Toxotis Larissa in the play-off final and won promotion in Delta Ethniki the following season.

=== Classification in Delta Ethniki ===
Season	Classification	Group
1984-85	16th	Group 5

== Stadium ==
Larisaikos used Alcazar Stadium, the biggest stadium of the town of Larissa for its home games for almost 30 years until its initial dissolution. After the 1969 re-establishment the club played its home games at the Larisaikos' ground in the Nea Smyrni district. Currently they play their home games in Viologiko Ground, nearby their previous home and still located in the historic district of Nea Smirni.

== Honours ==
- Larissa FCA Championship:

- Winners (3): 1960-61, 1961-62, 1983-84

- Beta Ethniki:

- Group Winners (1): 1961-62

== Notable players ==
- (Greece) Dimitris Zampas
- (Greece) Mihalis Karelias
- (Greece) Georgios Plitsis
- (Greece) Nikos Plitsis
- (Greece) Giorgos Liapis

== Notable coaches ==
- (Greece) Christos Andreoudis
- (Greece) Feraios Giannakos

== Notable chairmen ==
- (Greece) Thodoris Kourtis

== Sources ==
Koltsidas, Vangelis (2018). ΤΟ ΕΡΑΣΙΤΕΧΝΙΚΟ ΠΟΔΟΣΦΑΙΡΟ ΣΤΟ ΝΟΜΟ ΛΑΡΙΣΑΣ (PDF) (in Greek). p. 82. Archived from the original (PDF) on 2022-11-12.
