= Ilias Kotsios =

Greek footballer

Personal information
- Date of birth: 25 April 1977 (age 49)
- Place of birth: Larissa, Greece
- Height: 1.84 m (6 ft 1/2 in)
- Position: Defender

Youth career
- 1992-1995: Ikaros Neapolis
- 1995–1996: Iraklis Larissa

Senior career*
Years	Team	Apps	(Gls)
1996–2004	OFI	112	(10)
2004–2007	Panathinaikos	39	(2)
2007–2009	AEL	43	(1)
2009–2012	PAS Giannina	81	(6)
2012–2013	AEL Kalloni	32	(3)
2014–2015	Levadiakos	40	(5)
2015–2017	OFI	33	(3)

Managerial career
- 2017: OFI (technical director)
- 2019: Kentavros Vrilissia
- 2020: Lamia (assistant)
- 2021: AEL (technical director)
- 2022: Karaiskakis (assistant)
- 2023: Levadiakos (assistant)
- 2024: Orestis Orestiada
- 2024–2026: Ergotelis
- 2026: Ethnikos Piraeus
- * Club domestic league appearances and goals

Ilias Kotsios (Greek: Ηλίας Κώτσιος; born 25 April 1977) is a Greek professional football manager and former footballer, who played as defender. He has also played for Levadiakos, Panathinaikos, AEL, PAS Giannina and AEL Kalloni.

== Career ==
Kotsios started his career from the youth department of Ikaros Neapolis, a clb based in Larissa. After two years he moved to Iraklis Larissa and he was recommended to OFI by his Ikaros Neapolis coach Ilias Selionis, also an ex-player of the Cretan club. He first worked with renowned Dutch coach Eugene Gerrard and stayed with OFI for 8 seasons before signing for Panathinaikos.
Kotsios stayed with Panathinaikos for 3 years and in 2007 he returned to his hometown club Larissa playing in the UEFA Cup. In 2015 he signed for OFI again to finish his career in 2017.

On 2 November 2005 Panathinaikos were defeated by Barcelona with 5–0 in the UEFA Champions League in Lionel Messi. After the end of the game Kotsios swapped jerseys with the 18-year old then Lionel Messi who scored his first ever goal in Europe.

== Honours ==
=== Panathinaikos ===
- Greek Cup: Runner-up 2006–07
