= Vasilios Koutsianikoulis =

Greek footballer (born 1988)

Vasilis Koutsianikoulis
Personal information
- Full name: Vasilios Koutsianikoulis
- Date of birth: 9 August 1988 (age 38)
- Place of birth: Larissa, Greece
- Height: 1.68 m (5 ft 6 in)
- Positions: Left winger; attacking midfielder

Youth career
- Aris Larissa
- –2005: Iraklis Halki

Senior career*
Years	Team	Apps	(Gls)
2005–2007	Iraklis Halki		
2007–2009	Ergotelis	39	(4)
2009–2011	PAOK	37	(3)
2011–2012	Ergotelis	27	(1)
2012–2015	OFI	75	(8)
2015–2017	AEL	31	(1)
2017–2019	OFI	45	(10)
2019–2020	Olympiacos Volos	21	(2)
2020–2021	Doxa Dramas	20	(0)
2021–2022	Anagennisi Karditsas	12	(1)
2022–2023	Trikala		
2023	Kavala		
2023–2024	AER Afantou		
2024–2025	Atromitos Palama		
2025	AO Karystou		

International career^{‡}
2007–2008	Greece U19	2	(0)
2008–2012	Greece U21	13	(4)
- * Club domestic league appearances and goals as of 30 May 2022 ‡ National team caps and goals as of 2 July 2017

Vasilios Koutsianikoulis (Greek: Βασίλειος Κουτσιανικούλης; born 9 August 1988) is a Greek former professional footballer who played as a left winger or an attacking midfielder.

== Club career ==
=== Early years ===
Koutsianikoulis began his football career at Aris Larissa youth section and later moved to local club Iraklis Halki, where his uncle Makis Kputsianikoulis played until the 1990s. Iraklis Halki, at the time we're playing in the Delta Ethniki, the fourth tier of the Greek football league system. His performances drew the attention of Greece U19 coach Nikos Nioplias, who arranged for his first international call-up as well as sending him on a trial period at his former club OFI in April 2007. Koutsianikoulis played a single pre-season friendly game with OFI against local rival Ergotelis. As the manager of OFI at the time Reiner Maurer had second thoughts on signing Koutsianikoulis on his outfit, Ergotelis, who were impressed with his performance during that friendly approached the player and signed him instead.

=== Ergotelis ===
Koutsianikoulis debuted for Ergotelis during the 2007–08 Super League season, where he played in a total of 12 matches, 10 of which he came in as a substitute. In total, Koutsianikoulis played 126 minutes, and did not score any goals.

His breakout season came the next year, when he became a regular starter. Due to his short stature and agility, Koutsianikoulis demonstrated an impressive ability to evade opposing tackles and beat the defensive line on attacking runs, while his finishing and precise passing to create scoring opportunities for his teammates led the Greek media to dub him "the Greek Messi" or "Messi for the poor", often drawing comparisons between his and the Argentinian super-star's playing style, though Koutsianikoulis himself requested these nicknames and comparisons to be dropped. He impressed with his performance in an uncommon 3−0 club home win against Aris in September 2008, where he assisted his club's second goal and posed a continuous threat to the opposing defense. He followed up this performance with 2 goals and one assist in his club's 2−3 away win vs. Panathinaikos, considered at the time one of the biggest upsets in the "Greens"' history. After scoring one more goal, and consistently performing well vs. reigning champions Olympiacos, Koutsianikoulis was called up for the Greece national team by coach Otto Rehhagel, an uncommon call-up for a player not playing in one of the traditional giants of Greek football, and a first for an Ergotelis player. Despite eventually not making any international caps, Koutsianikoulis' league performances with Ergotelis (he finished the season with 4 goals and 6 assists in 27 games) and rising popularity among Greek fans and press made him a target for all major clubs in Greece.

=== PAOK ===
During the summer transfer window of 2009, Ergotelis reportedly received, and declined transfer offers from Olympiacos and Panathinaikos, eventually reaching an agreement with PAOK on May 22, 2009. Koutsianikoulis became the most expensive transfer in Ergotelis history, earning his club a transfer fee of a reported €1,2M, as well as a friendly match between the two teams of which all ticket sales' income would be paid to Ergotelis. He signed a 4-year contract with PAOK on 25 May 2009.

Despite high hopes placed on Koutsianikoulis' development, and a dream debut in the 2009–10 Super League opening match vs. Levadiakos, where he scored one goal and delivered two assists in an easy 3−0 home win for his club, his eventual performances did not manage to impress PAOK coach Fernando Santos, who benched him for the majority of games in the 2009–10 season, while fans were frustrated and left to expect more from the "Greek Messi". His second year with the club was even more unremarkable, as he played in only 11 matches across all competitions. As PAOK sought to rid themselves of Koutsianikoulis' contract, Ergotelis' officials, who were still owed money from Koutsianikoulis' transfer fee and believed in his talent, reached out to PAOK and arranged for his return to Crete.

=== Return to Ergotelis ===
In July 2007, Ergotelis announced the return of Koutsianikoulis in a transfer deal involving a 50% co-ownership of the player's rights with PAOK for an undisclosed fee clearing the debts of PAOK to Ergotelis, while the player's annual contract was estimated at €400K. Koutsianikoulis signed a 4-year contract with his former club and managed to re-establish himself while in Crete, playing in 27 matches and scoring one goal. Ergotelis failed to avoid relegation At the end of the 2011−12 season however, and as the board of directors decided to release many of the club's players with wealthy contracts, the club pre-maturely terminated Koutsianikoulis' contract on mutual consent, all while the player was rumored to be close to a free transfer move to AEK and continue his career in the Super League.

=== OFI ===
Reports had linked Koutsianikoulis with both AEK Athens and OFI in the weeks after his release from Ergotelis and it seemed the Athenian club had convinced the Greek youth international to join, despite their well-documented financial troubles. AEK were keen to sign Koutsianikoulis, and confirmed negotiations between club president, Thomas Mavros and the player's manager in an attempt to strengthen AEK's squad, which had been decimated by the departure of a raft of key players during the summer. Eventually however, Koutsianikoulis chose to move to his former club's local rival OFI, who had secured the required license from the tax office to partake in the 2012−13 Superelague season. On August 20, 2012, Koutsianikoulis finally signed a 3-year contract with OFI.

He made his debut with the club in August 2012, during a 0–0 home draw against Skoda Xanthi, and scored his first goal on 29 October 2012 during a 2–2 home draw against Panetolikos. He spent the next three seasons at OFI, making 89 appearances in both the Super League and the Greek Cup, scoring 8 goals. On 21 March 2015, OFI withdrew from professional competitions, as the administration failed to meet the club's pressing financial obligations and criticized the top-flight circuit for “unfair and uneven decisions” against the club. In a symbolic gesture, Koutsianikoulis, along with the other 14 players who still comprised the club's roster at the time walked on the pitch of the Theodoros Vardinogiannis Stadium on that day (before match-day 29) and waived the fans OF OFI farewell. As a result of the departure of OFI, Koutsianikoulis was released from his contract with the club.

In June 2015, Koutsianikoulis was reported to join Greek Supere League side Veria, under the advice of the club's Technical Director Zisis Vryzas, with whom Koutsianikoulis had collaborated during his time at PAOK. The deal was however never realized.

=== AEL ===
After brief flirts with Veria and Trikala, Koutsianikoulis eventually signed a 3-year contract with Football League side AEL on September 3, 2015, marking his return to his hometown Larissa. He made 23 appearances for AEL and scored one goal during the 2015−16 Football League season, helping his club win the division title and achieve instant promotion to the Super League.

After returning to the Super League Greece with AEL, Koutsianikoulis' playing time significantly dropped. He made only 7 league appearances during the 2016−17 season, and just one appearance in next year's edition of the competition. As a result, Koutsianikoulis' contract was terminated by the club on mutual consent in September 2017.

=== Return to OFI ===
On 11 September 2017, Koutsianikoulis returned to OFI, at the time playing in the Football League, signing a one-year contract with the club for an undisclosed fee. On 30 October 2017 he scored his first goal since his return during a 2−1 away win against Panserraikos. Again faced with the club's recurring financial troubles, Koutsianikoulis raised his game after the departure of several key players at the attempt of OFI in returning to the Super league, scoring crucial goals in a 0−2 away win against Panegialios on 13 January 2018, and a 3−0 home win against fellow promotion contenders Doxa Drama on 17 January 2018. On 31 March 2018, he scored with a wonderful strike, curling the ball into the net from distance with the help of a slight deflection, as his club made another huge step towards promotion to the Super League, defeating 3-0 nearest challengers Panachaiki. At the end of the 2017–18 season, he celebrated the promotion to Super League.

On 28 May 2019, the team announced that his contract would not be renewed.

=== Olympiacos Volos ===
On 11 September 2019, Koutsianikoulis joined Olympiacos Volos as a free transfer for an undisclosed fee.

=== Later years ===
From the 2020–21 season, he played for Super League Greece 2 clubs Doxa Drama F.C. and Anagennisi Karditsa F.C.

== International career ==
Koutsianikoulis' skills during his time with Iraklis Chalki, drew the attention of Greek U−19 coach Nikos Nioplias, who enlisted him in the squad that featured in the 2007 UEFA European U−19 Championship, in which Greece reached the Final. Koutsianikoulis played for one half against Spain during the competition Group stage, and then again in the competition Final, once more against Spain, where the Greeks narrowly lost the title (1–0).

Aged 20 and already an international with Greece U−21, Koutsianikoulis shot to prominence in 2008, during a string of impressive matches with Ergotelis against Aris, Panathinaikos and Olympiacos. His performances were eventually rewarded by Greece head coach Otto Rehhagel, who named Koutsianikoulis in his 20-man squad for an international friendly against Italy on 19 May 2008 at Karaiskakis Stadium in Piraeus. Despite being considered a strong prospect for the national team, Koutsianikoulis was ultimately not fielded during the match, and the eventual decline of his career after his transfer move to PAOK severely hurt his chances for receiving another call-up.

== Club statistics ==
Club	Season		League			Cup			Continental			Total		
Club	Season	Division	Apps	Goals	Assists	Apps	Goals	Assists	Apps	Goals	Assists	Apps	Goals	Assists
Ergotelis	2007–08	Super League Greece	12	0	0	0	0	0	0	0	0	12	0	0
Ergotelis	2008–09	Super League Greece	27	4	6	1	0	0	0	0	0	28	4	6
PAOK	2009–10	Super League Greece	29	2	3	3	0	0	3	0	0	35	2	3
PAOK	2010–11	Super League Greece	8	1	0	3	0	0	2	0	0	13	1	0
Ergotelis	2011–12	Super League Greece	27	1	3	0	0	0	0	0	0	27	1	3
OFI	2012–13	Super League Greece	28	5	2	1	0	0	0	0	0	29	5	2
OFI	2013–14	Super League Greece	27	2	2	7	0	1	0	0	0	34	2	3
OFI	2014–15	Super League Greece	20	1	3	6	1	1	0	0	0	26	2	4
AEL	2015–16	Football League	23	1	4	3	0	0	0	0	0	26	1	4
AEL	2016–17	Super League Greece	7	0	0	3	0	1	0	0	0	10	0	1
AEL	2017–18	Super League Greece	1	0	0	0	0	0	0	0	0	1	0	0
OFI	2017–18	Football League	27	10	9	3	0	0	0	0	0	30	10	9
OFI	2018–19	Super League Greece	18	0	3	2	0	0	0	0	0	20	0	3
Olympiacos Volos	2019–20	Football League	8	1	0	0	0	0	0	0	0	8	1	0
Doxa Drama	2020–21	Super League Greece 2	20	0	0	0	0	0	0	0	0	20	0	0
Anagennisi Karditsa	2021–22	Super League Greece 2	12	1	2	0	0	0	0	0	0	14	1	0
Career total			294	29	37	31	1	3	5	0	0	333	30	37

Statistics accurate as of 12 January 2022

== Honours ==
=== Club ===
AEL

- Football League: 2015–16

OFI

- Football League: 2017–18

=== International ===
Greece U−19

- UEFA European Under-19 Championship: Runner-up 2007

=== Individual ===
- Greek Young Footballer of the year: 2009
