= Haido Alexouli =

Greek long jumper

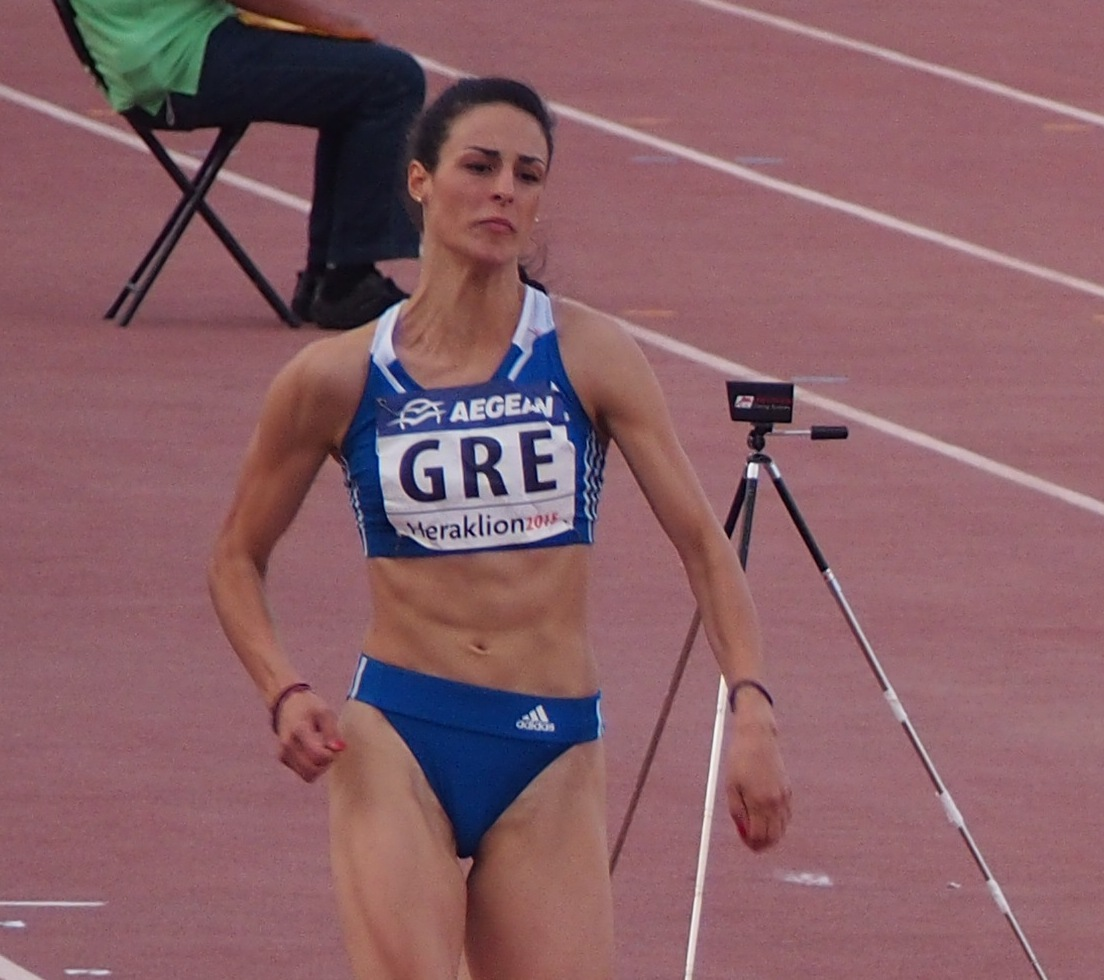
- Haido Alexouli in 2015

Personal information
- Nationality: Greek
- Born: 29 March 1991 (age 35)
- Height: 180 cm (5 ft 11 in)
- Weight: 60 kg (132 lb)

Sport
- Country: Greece
- Sport: Track and field
- Event: Long jump

Achievements and titles
- Personal bests: 6.78 m (2016); 6.46 m (i) (2017)

Haido Alexouli (Greek: Χάιδω Αλεξούλη) (born 29 March 1991 in Larissa) is a Greek athlete who specialises in the long jump. She competed at the 2016 Summer Olympics. Her father Giannis Alexoulis is a former professional football player who played for AEL and PAOK.

== Competition record ==
Year	Competition	Venue	Position	Notes
Representing Greece
2016	European Championships	Amsterdam, Netherlands	14th (q)	6.43 m
2016	Olympic Games	Rio de Janeiro, Brazil	32nd (q)	6.13 m
2017	World Championships	London, United Kingdom	26th (q)	5.94 m
2018	European Championships	Berlin, Germany	23rd (q)	6.21 m
