= Achilleas Farsala F.C. =

Achilleas Farsala
- Founded: 1928; 98 years ago
- Ground: Farsala Municipal Stadium
- Capacity: 2,500
- Chairman: Vasilios Bersianis
- Manager: Aristos Papageorgiou
- League: Larissa FCA Second Division
- 2025–26: Larissa FCA Second Division (Group 2), 10th
- Website: https://axilleasfarsalon.gr/
Home colours	Away colours

Achilleas Farsala F.C. (Greek: Α.Ο. Αχιλλέας Φαρσάλων), also known simply as Achilleas, A.O.F. or with its full name as A.O.F. Achilleus 1928 (Greek: Αθλητικός Όμιλος Φαρσάλων Αχιλλεύς), is a Greek football club, based in Farsala, a historical city near Larissa. The colour of the team's shirts is yellow and black.

== History ==
Achilleas was founded on 1928 and is one of the most historical clubs in Greece and one of the most historical teams in Larissa. The team participates for several years in Larissa FCA championships, but it also took part at the past at Football League and Gamma Ethniki. Achilleas Farsala is proud to be the team with the most Larissa FCA cups, 7 in total. Some important players of Greek football have played at the team, like Nikolaos Kehagias, George Moustakas, Christos Dailianis at the past, Nikos Voulgaris, Apostolos Tsianakas, Vasilis Tsianakas, Christos Oikonomou, Kostas Nebegleras at the recent years. Also, the team had in its staff many famous coaches, like Horacio Morales.

=== Notable players ===
- (Greece) Nikos Kechagias
- (Greece) Giorgos Moustakas
- (Greece) Kostas Nebegleras
- (Greece) Konstantinos Kourtesiotis
- (Greece) Dimitrios Ziogas
- (Greece) Apostolos Tsianakas
- (Greece) Giorgos Raios
- (Greece) Makis Triantafyllopoulos
- (Greece) Charalampos Dosas
- (Greece) Alexandros Kakazoukis

=== Notable coaches ===
- (Argentina) Horacio Morales
- (Greece) Nikos Patsiavouras
- (Greece) Makis Triantafyllopoulos
- (Greece) Takis Parafestas
- (Greece) Evangelos Brisimis
- (Greece) Vasilis Bakogiannis

== Crest and colors ==
The official colors of the club are yellow and black, with white also being utilized, primarily for away fixtures. Yellow is the predominant color in the club's crest, which depicts the mythological hero Achilles.

== Stadium ==
The Farsala Municipal Stadium has a capacity of about 2,500 people and is considered to be one of the largest courts in the prefecture after AEL FC Arena and Alcazar Stadium.

== Supporters ==
The fans of the team, are called Myrmidons (Greek: Μυρμιδόνες), like the ancient Greek brave warriors from Farsala, trained by Achilles, support the team with passion and follow the team at home and away matches.

== Honours ==
=== Domestic Titles and honours ===
  - Gamma Ethniki champions: 1
    - 1972–73
  - Delta Ethniki champions: 2
    - 1984–85, 1987–88
  - Larissa FCA Champions: 10
    - 1969–70, 1970–71, 1972–73, 1975–76, 1977–78, 1978–79, 1980–81, 1995–96, 2002–03, 2016–17
  - Larissa FCA Cup Winners: 7
    - 1977–78, 1978–79, 1981–82, 1982–83, 1990–91, 2003–04, 2016–17
