= Rubí de Bracamonte =

Coordinates: 41°13′N 4°55′W

Rubí de Bracamonte, Spain
- Flag Coat of arms
- Interactive map of Rubí de Bracamonte, Spain
- Country: Spain
- Autonomous community: Castile and León
- Province: Valladolid
- Municipality: Rubí de Bracamonte

Area
  - Total: 25 km^{2} (9.7 sq mi)

Population (2025-01-01)
  - Total: 207
  - Density: 8.3/km^{2} (21/sq mi)
- Time zone: UTC+1 (CET)
  - Summer (DST): UTC+2 (CEST)

Rubí de Bracamonte is a municipality located in the province of Valladolid, Castile and León, Spain. According to the 2004 census (INE), the municipality has a population of 305 inhabitants.

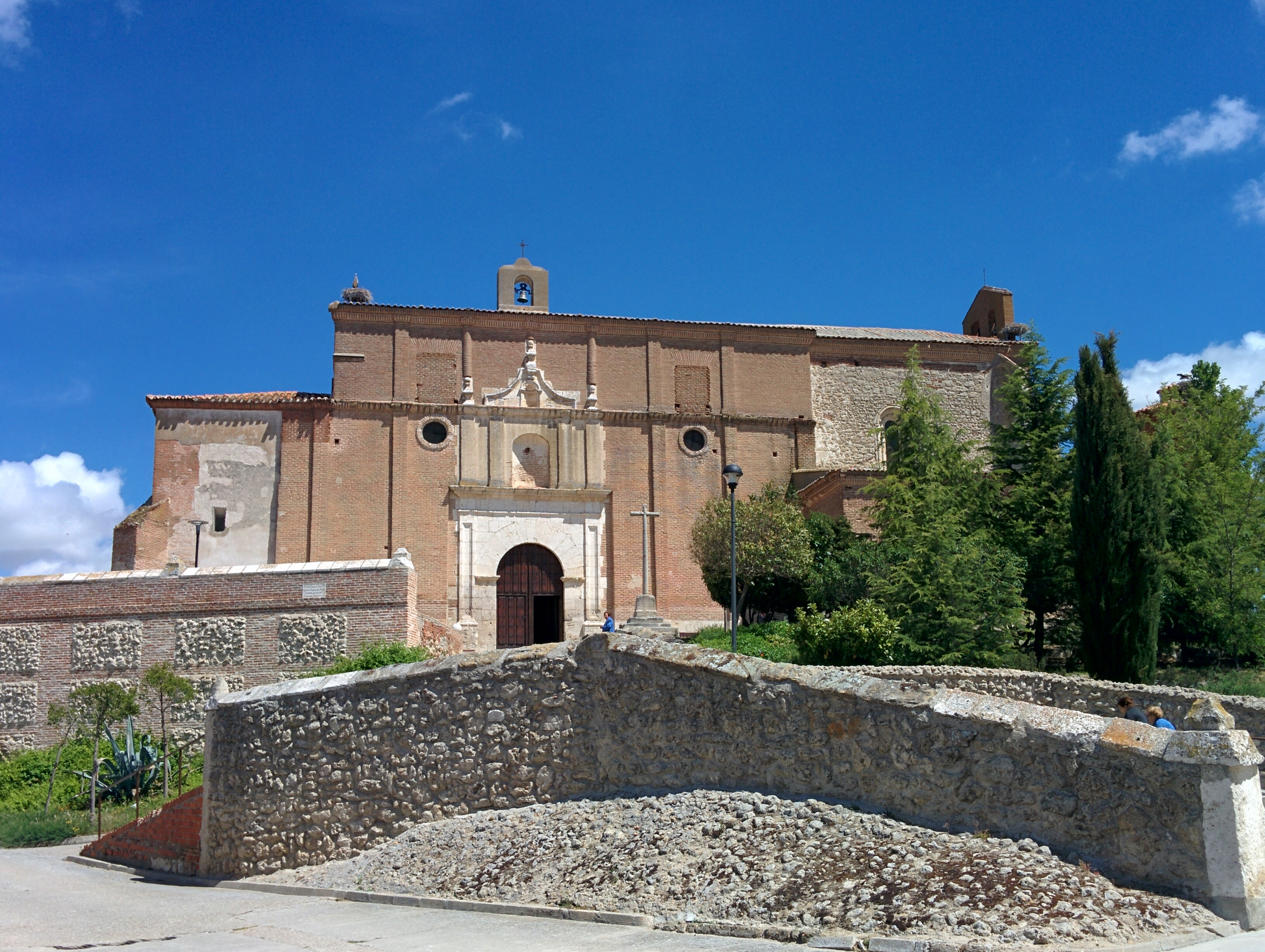
Church of Santa María del Castillo in Rubí de Bracamonte, Valladolid, Spain
