= Oikonomos Tsaritsani F.C. =

Oikonomos Tsaritsani
- Full name: Oikonomos Tsaritsanis Football Club
- Founded: 1953; 73 years ago
- Ground: Municipal Stadium "Georgios Mitsibonas"
- Capacity: 1,000
- Chairman: Stavros Anagnostoulis
- Manager: Giorgos Matos
- League: Larissa FCA First Division
- 2025–26: Larissa FCA First Division, 3rd
- Website: http://www.oikonomos.gr
Home colours	Away colours

Oikonomos Football Club (Greek: Α.Ο. Οικονόμος Τσαριτσάνης) is a Greek football club, based in Tsaritsani, Larissa regional unit. The association was founded in 1953.

== History ==
Oikonomos started from the lower divisions of the Larissa FCA. In 2009 the club came close to promotion to Delta Ethniki but finished runners-up. The following 2009–10 season they were promoted to the Greek fourth division and in 2011, another promotion followed to the Football League 2 for the first time in history after becoming champions of the 2010–11 Delta Ethniki.

In the 2011-12 Oikonomos missed out on promotion to Beta Ethniki in the play-off round. The club played in Football League 2 for 5 seasons until 2015–16. Oikonomos returned to the third tier in 2018 and returned to the Larissa FCA in 2021.

Legendary centre-back Giorgos Mitsibonas (1988 Greek champion) started his career from the club as striker in late 1970s.

=== Nikoulis: hat-trick record ===
On 10 October 2010 during the match against Apollon Larissa (4–1), Oikonomos' forward Alexis Nikoulis scored a record hat-trick from direct free-kicks. Nikoulis' record equalized that of Kostas Frantzeskos of 1997 in Greek football. He is one of the few players worldwide to achieve such a feat.

=== Notable players ===
- (Greece) Giorgos Mitsibonas
- (Greece) Thanasis Basbanas
- (Greece) Apostolos Tsianakas
- (Greece) Alexis Nikoulis
- (Greece) Giannis Vaitsis
- (Greece) Antonis Poutas
- (Greece) Christos Veletanis

=== Notable managers ===
- (Greece) Giorgos Kaltekis
- (Greece) Kostas Katsaras

== Honours ==
  - Delta Ethniki champions: 1
    - 2010–11
  - Larissa FCA Champions: 3
    - 1984–85, 2009–10, 2017–18
  - Larissa FCA Cup Winners: 1
    - 2017–18
