= Toxotis Larissa =

Association football club in Greece

- Full name: PAO Toxotis Larissa
- Founded: 1943; 83 years ago
- Ground: Koukoulitsios-Mousiaris Ground, Larissa, Greece
- Capacity: 300
- Chairman: Giorgos Kosmidis
- Manager: Makis Alexoudis
- League: Larissa FCA Second Division
- 2025–26: Larissa FCA Second Division (Group 1), 6th
Home colours	Away colours

Toxotis Larissa (Greek: Π.Α.Ο. Τοξότης Λάρισας) is a football club based in Larissa, Greece. The colour of the club's jerseys are red and white. One of the greatest Greek midfielders of the 90s, Vassilis Karapialis, and prolific striker Theofanis Gekas, both started their career from the club.

== History ==
The club was founded in 1943 during the Axis occupation of Greece and a few years later it started playing in the league of the Thessaly Football Clubs Association until 1960 and subsequently in the league of the Larissa Football Clubs Association until 1964. In that year, the club alongside other three local clubs from the town of Larissa formed AEL, and after merging with Panthessalikos (founded in 1959) the new club was renamed to Olympos Larissa F.C.
Two years later in 1966, Toxotis under the new name of Olympos Larissa F.C., won the Larissa Football Clubs Association championship and gained promotion to Gamma Ethniki. In 1976 the club returned to its original name Toxotis and 11 years later in 1986 managed to win promotion to Delta Ethniki for first time in its history after winning the Larissa Football Clubs Association championship.
While the team enjoyed success in Delta Ethniki, some Toxotis' former members founded Toxotis '88 in 1988, a short-lived club which was renamed back to Olympos Larissa in 1990 and it remained active until 2014.

== Stadium ==
Toxotis Larissa first stadium was the Alcazar Stadium in the town of Larissa which was the largest in Thessaly in the 1940s with a capacity of 8.000. The club played there alongside other local teams such as Iraklis Larissa, Aris Larissa and Larisaikos until 1964, the year that the four of them merged to form AEL. During the 80s and 90s Toxotis played its home games in the training ground which is right next to Alcazar Stadium, with a wooden stand of a 400 capacity.
The club has been using the Koukoulitsios-Mousiaris pitch in recent years, a ground which was named after two local footballers, Dimitrios Koukoulitsios and Dimitrios Mousiaris who died at young age in a car accident in 1979.

== Club's academy ==
Toxotis Larissa former player Christos Gkatas was in charge of the youth academy and at the helm of the club from 2011 to 2020. But in 2018 the club's youth academy was dissolved and moved under the umbrella of AEL, the biggest club of the town of Larissa in a bid for Toxotis to get financial aide.

=== Chairman Tourlakopoulos ===
Stavros Tourlakopoulos was involved in Toxotis board of directors since 1964 and the merge with Panthessalikos, a club of which he was the chairman between 1960 and 1964. In 1992 he was elected the chairman of Toxotis Larissa and he remained such as until his death in 2013, at the age of 80.

== Toxotis players who won the Greek first division ==
Vassilis Karapialis and Giorgos Agorogiannis were teammates in Toxotis Larissa in the 1980s before they were transferred to Athlitiki Enosi Larissa F.C. and won the Super League Greece in 1988. Agorogiannis would win the league again a few years later as a AEK Athens F.C. player and Karapialis would win 4 more as an Olympiacos F.C. player. Kostas Chalkias won the title twice with Panathinaikos and he was also crowned champion of Europe winning the UEFA European Championship in 2004.

=== Notable players ===
- (Greece) Vassilis Karapialis
- (Greece) Theofanis Gekas
- (Greece) Christos Gkatas
- (Greece) Kostas Chalkias
- (Greece) Giorgos Agorogiannis
- (Greece) Fotis Gouziotis
- (Greece) Dimitrios Kolovetsios
- (Greece) Lakis Pagkarliotas
- (Greece) Giorgos Kaffes
- (Greece) Nikos Vlachoulis
- (Greece) Vasilis Christodoulou
- (Greece) Ilias Selionis
- (Greece) Makis Alexoudis
- (Greece) Rafael Tsaknakis
- (Greece) Konstantinos Theodoropoulos

== Notable coaches ==
- (Greece) Christos Gkatas
- (Greece) Stelios Koromilas
- (Greece) Giorgos Kamakas
- (Greece) Giannis Vaitsis
- (Greece) Filippo Theoharidis
- (Greece) Makis Alexoudis

== Classification in Delta Ethniki ==
Season	Classification	Group	Pld	Pts
1986–87	7th	Group 5	36	43
1987–88	4th	Group 4	34	44
1988–89	3rd	Group 4	34	43
1989–90	2nd	Group 4	38	53
1990–91	3rd	Group 5	42	50
1991–92	4th	Group 5	36	51
1992–93	11th	Group 11	34	38
1993–94	8th	Group 11	34	54
1994–95	15th	Group 4	34	38

== Honours ==
- Larissa FCA Championship:

- Winners (1): 1985-1986
- Runners-up (1): 1983-1984

- Larissa FCA Cup

- Winners (1): 1988-89

== Ground ==
Toxotis used to play at the Alcazar Stadium in the city of Larissa until 1964. Later, the club played its home games at the Little Alcazar right next to the Alcazar Stadium. After the ground' s conversion into an athletics centre, Toxotis moved to the Koukoulitsios-Mousiarhs ground in the Averof-Xenia neighborhood.
