= Alcazar Stadium =

Multi-purpose stadium in Larissa, Greece

E.A.K. Larissas
- Alcazar
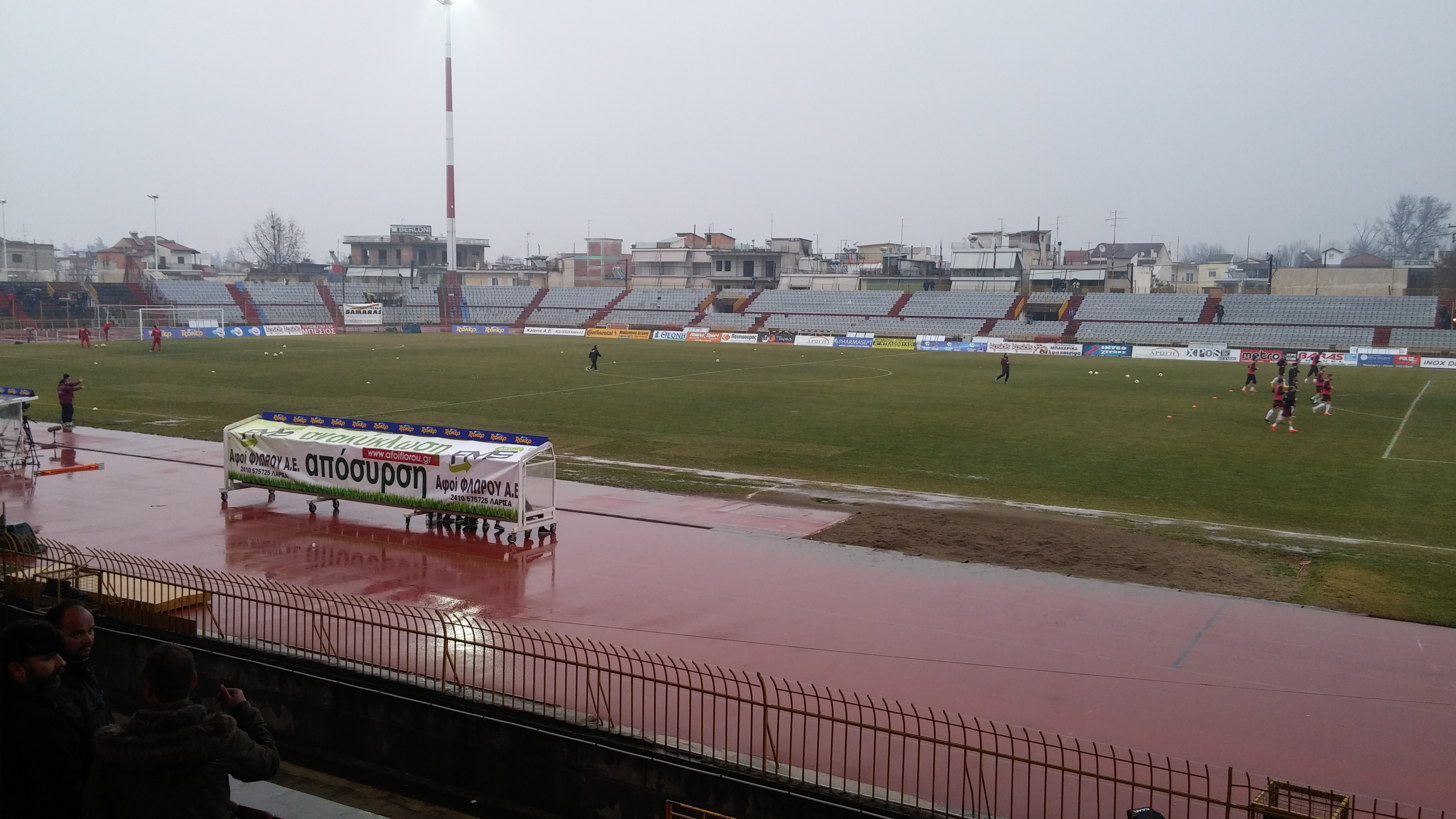
- Interactive map of E.A.K. Larissas
- Full name: Ethniko Athlitiko Kentro Larissas
- Former names: National Stadium "Olympic Winner Crown Prince Constantine"
- Location: Larissa, Greece
- Coordinates: 39°38′55.36″N 22°24′43.60″E
- Owner: General Secretariat of Sports
- Operator: ΑΕ Kileler
- Capacity: 13,108
- Surface: Grass
- Scoreboard: Yes

Construction
- Groundbreaking: 1932
- Renovated: 1936, 1960, 2004, 2020

Tenants
- Iraklis Larissa (1932-1964); Larisaikos F.C. (1932-1964); Aris Larissa (1932-1964); Toxotis Larissa (1932-1964); AEL FC (1964–2010, 2013–2015, 2020–2023); Tyrnavos 2005 (2013-15); Apollon Larissa (2017–18); AE Killeler (2023-25)

Alcazar Stadium is a multi-purpose stadium in Larissa, Greece part of the National Sports Complex of Larissa (Εθνικό Αθλητικό Κέντρο Λάρισας-Ε.Α.Κ.Λ.). It got its nickname because it is located in the Alcazar park, in Larisa, which was named after the Arabic name for the park which means "The Castle". The stadium was the homeground of the football team AEL from 1964 to 2010, from 2013 to 2015 and from July 2020 until July 2023. It holds 13,108 seats and was built in 1932, while massively renovated in 1064-65. Its highest capacity before seats installation was 18.500 in the 1990s.

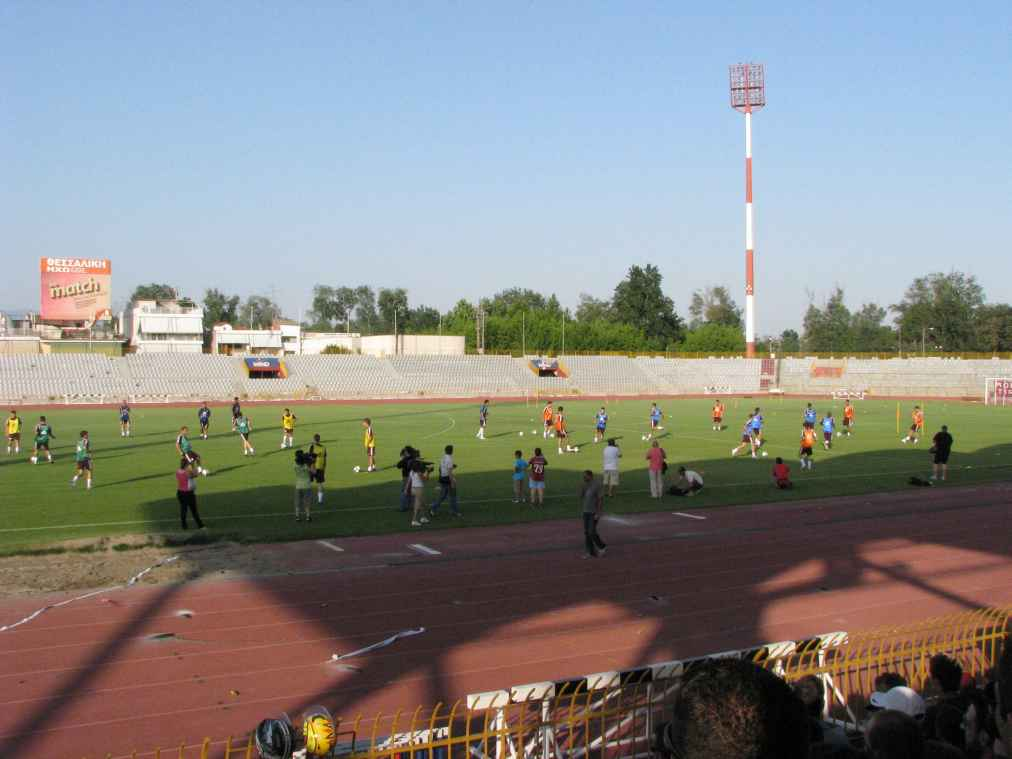
