= Apostolos Tsianakas =

Greek footballer

Personal information
- Full name: Apostolos Tsianakas
- Date of birth: 11 July 1979 (age 47)
- Place of birth: Larissa, Greece
- Height: 1.81 m (5 ft 11 in)
- Position: Defender

Team information
- Current team: Achilleas Farsalon F.C.
- Number: 24

Youth career
- 1996-1998: Anthoupoli Larissa

Senior career*
Years	Team	Apps	(Gls)
1998-2000	AOK Neon Karyon		
2000–2001	AEL	32	(2)
2001	Akratitos	0	(0)
2002–2003	Fostiras	39	(2)
2003–2005	Ethnikos Asteras	52	(0)
2005–2006	Lamia	11	(0)
2006	Trikala	4	(0)
2006–2008	Aiolikos	76	(2)
2009	Fostiras	12	(0)
2010–2011	Eordaikos	19	(0)
2011–2014	Oikonomos Tsaritsani	20	(2)
- * Club domestic league appearances and goals as of 09:58, 22 June 2012 (UTC)

Apostolos Tsianakas (Greek: Απόστολος Τσιανάκας; born 11 July 1979) is a Greek football player who currently plays for Oikonomos Tsaritsani in the Greek Football League 2.

== Career ==
Born in Larissa, Tsianakas played for AEL and Fostiras in the Greek Beta Ethniki and was on the books of Akratitos during the 2001–02 season.
