= Bracamontes =

Bracamontes is a Spanish surname and may refer to:

- Carlos Bracamontes (born 1959), Mexican football manager and former player
- Jacqueline Bracamontes (born 1979), Mexican actress and model
- Jesús Bracamontes (born 1951), Mexican soccer coach
- Luis Bracamontes (born 1970), Mexican murderer of American police officers
- Luis Enrique Bracamontes (1923–2003), Mexican politician
