= Pyrgetos F.C. =

Pyrgetos
- Full name: Athlitikos Syllogos Pyrgetos
- Founded: 1960; 65 years ago
- Ground: Pyrgetos Municipal Stadium
- Chairman: Kollatos Konstantinos
- Manager: Argyroulis Nikolaos
- League: Football League 2 (Group 3)
- 2013-14: Football League 2 (Group 3) 15th (Relegated)
- Website: http://aspyrgetos.blogspot.gr/

Pyrgetos F.C. is a Greek football club, based in Pyrgetos, Larissa.

== History ==
The club was founded in 1960. It started playing in the Larissa Football Clubs Association and in 2008-09 won promotion to Delta Ethniki. Pyrgetos competed in Football League 2, the Greek third tier, in the 2013–14 season.

=== Notable players ===
- (Greece) Konstantinos Mangos
- (Greece) Giannis Providas
- (Greece) Giannis Kokkinos
- (Greece) Christos Gkikoudis
- (Greece) Christos Veletanis
- (Greece) Apostolis Nastas

=== Notable coaches ===
- (Greece) Kostas Katsaras
- (Greece) Christos Gkatas
- (Greece) Nikos Argyroulis

== Honours ==
  - Larissa FCA Champions: 1
    - 2007–08
  - Larissa FCA Cup Winners: 2
    - 2008, 2010
