= Dotieas Agia F.C. =

Dotieas Agia
- Full name: Athlitikos Omilos Dotieas Agia
- Founded: 1960; 66 years ago
- Ground: Agia Municipal Stadium
- Capacity: 500
- Chairman: Dimitrios Delis
- Manager: Dimitrios Boukouvalas
- League: Larissa FCA First Division
- 2025–26: Larissa FCA First Division, 7th
| Home colours | Away colours |

Dotieas Agia F.C. is a Greek football club, based in Agia, Larissa.

== History ==
The club was founded in 1960. After earning promotion to Larissa FCA's top division Dotieas won the 1984-85 championship (5th tier at the time) for first time in its history and promoted to Delta Ethniki. They repeated it in the 2011–12 season.
Dotieas have won the Larissa FCA three times earning promotion to national divisions: Gamma Ethniki and Delta Ethniki.
They play in the championship of Division A' of Larissa FCA for the 2023–24 season.

Old logo of the team

== Notable players ==
- (Greece) Giannis Vaitsis
- (Greece) Giorgos Tsatsalidis
- (Greece) Christos Chatziliadis
- (Greece) Kostas Brellas
- (Greece) Vasilios Rentzas
- (Greece) Giannis Kokkinos

== Notable coaches ==
- (Greece) Giannis Mangos
- (Greece) Konstantinos Mangos
- (Greece) Nikos Vlachoulis
- (Greece) Sotiris Antoniou
- (Greece) Giannis Vaitsis

== Honours ==
  - Larissa FCA Champions: 3
    - 1984–85, 2011–12, 2021–22
  - Larissa FCA Super Cup Champions: 1
    - 2012
