= Aetos Makrychori F.C. =

Aetos Makrychori
- Full name: Aetos Makrychori Football Club
- Founded: 1961; 65 years ago
- Ground: Makrychori Municipal Stadium
- Chairman: Nikos Stogiannis
- Manager: Achilleas Manakas
- League: Larissa FCA First Division
- 2025–26: Larissa FCA First Division, 10th

Aetos Makrychiri Football Club (Greek: Αετός Μακρυχωρίου) is a Greek football club based in Makrychori, Larissa, Greece.

== Honors ==
=== Domestic ===
  - Larissa FCA Champions: 2
    - 1989–90, 2019-20
  - Larissa FCA Cup Winners: 1
    - 1989-90
