= Larissa Football Clubs Association =

Association football governing body in Larissa Prefecture, Greece

- Full name: Larissa Football Clubs Association; Greek: Ένωση Ποδοσφαιρικών Σωματείων Λάρισας
- Short name: Larissa F.C.A.; Greek: Ε.Π.Σ. Λάρισας
- Founded: 1960; 66 years ago
- Headquarters: Larissa, Greece
- FIFA affiliation: Hellenic Football Federation
- President: Dimitrios Bouchlariotis
- Website: epslarissas.gr

Larissa Football Clubs Association (Greek: Ένωση Ποδοσφαιρικών Σωματείων Λάρισας) is an association football organization in Larissa Prefecture that is part of Hellenic Football Federation. LFCA is responsible for organizing the prefectural football (soccer) championships in four divisions (named A, A1, B and C) and the LFCA Cup. LFCA also organizes championship and cup competitions for youth and development teams.
The LFCA Championship (winner of LFCA A Division) is promoted to the Third National Division, while the LFCA Cup winner enters the Greek Football Amateur Cup.

== History ==
Larissa F.C.A. was founded in 1960 after the split from the Thessaly Football Clubs Association which now serves only for Magnesia (with headquarters in Volos).

== Larissa F.C.A. Championship System ==
The Larissa F.C.A. League System since 2001, when A1 Division was introduced, consists of four divisions, namely Alpha Division, the top-level football league in Larissa (fourth level in Greek Football), the Alpha 1 Division, second tier in the pyramid, the Beta Division usually with three Groups and constituting the third tier of the league system and finally the Gamma Division.

== Champions ==
The Larissa Football Clubs Association champions are listed as below:

Season	League One	Other group Champions		League Two
1960–61	Larisaikos (1)	-	-	Iraklis Halki
1961–62	Larisaikos (2)	-	-	Toxotis Larissa
1962–63	Anaplasis Tyrnavos (1)	-	-	AO Emporoypalliloi Larissa
1963–64	Apollon Larissa (1)	-	-	Falaniakos
1964–65	Anaplasis Tyrnavos (2)	-	-	
1965–66	Olympos Larissa (1)	-	-	Oikonomos Tsaritsani
1966–67	Iraklis Halki (1)	-	-	Panagrotikos Nikea
1967–68	Iraklis Halki (2)	-	-	Ampeloniakos
1968–69	A.E. Tyrnavos (1)	-	-	Olympos Larissa & Dafni Glafkis
1969–70	Achilleas Farsala (1)	-	-	Falaniakos & Dotieas Agias
1970–71	Achilleas Farsala (2)	-	-	Kissavos Sykourion & Anthoupoli Larissa
1971–72	Apollon Larissa (2)	-	-	Oikonomos Tsaritsani
1972–73	Achilleas Farsala (3)	-	-	
1973–74	Apollon Larissa (3)	-	-	A.E. Tyrnavos, AO Nees Karyes, Atrimitos Agioi Anargyroi
1974–75	Anthoupoli Larissa (1)	Apollon Larissa	-	-
1975–76	Achilleas Farsala (4)	PO Elassona	-	-
1976–77	Anthoupoli Larissa (2)	PO Elassona	-	-
1977–78	A.E. Tyrnavos (2)	Apollon Larissa	Achilleas Farsala	
1978–79	Apollon Larissa (4)	Achilleas Farsala	Ampeloniakos	
1979–80	Anthoupoli Larissa (3)	A.E. Tyrnavos	Falaniakos	
1980–81	Achilleas Farsala (5)	Apollon Larissa	A.E. Tyrnavos	
1981–82	Iraklis Halki (3)	Ampeloniakos	-	
1982–83	A.E. Tyrnavos (3)	Atromitos Vamvakou	-	
1983–84	Larisaikos (3)	Toxotis Larissa	-	
1984–85	Dotieas Agias (1)	Oikonomos Tsaritsani	-	
1985–86	Toxotis Larissa (1)	A.E. Tyrnavos	-	
1986–87	A.E. Tyrnavos (4)	-	-	Oikonomos Tsaritsani
1987–88	PO Elassona (1)	-	-	
1988–89	Iraklis Halki (4)	-	-	
1989–90	Aetos Makrychori (1)	-	-	
1990–91	Ampelokipoi (1)	-	-	
1991–92	Pineios Larissa (1)	-	-	
1992–93	Falaniakos (1)	-	-	
1993–94	Anthoupoli Larissa (4)	-	-	
1994–95	Iraklis Halki (5)	-	-	
1995–96	Achilleas Farsala (6)	-	-	
1996–97	Iraklis Halki (6)	-	-	
1997–98	AOK Nees Karyes (1)	-	-	
1998–99	Iraklis Larissa (1)	-	-	
1999–00	Iraklis Larissa (2)	-	-	
2000–01	Iraklis Halki (7)	-	-	
2001–02	Falaniakos (2)	-	-	
2002–03	Achilleas Farsala (7)	-	-	
2003–04	Filoktitis Melivia (1)	-	-	
2004–05	Kissavos Sykourion (1)	-	-	
2005–06	AE Dimos Nikeas (1)	-	-	
2006–07	Tyrnavos 2005 (1)	-	-	
2007–08	Pyrgetos (1)	-	-	Dotieas Agia & Doxa Argyropouli
2008–09	Elassona (1)	-	-	Voukefalas Larissa
2009–10	Oikonomos Tsaritsani (1)	-	-	AO Damasiakos
2010–11	Ampeloniakos (1)	-	-	Machitis Terpsithea
2011–12	Dotieas Agias (2)	-	-	Anagennisi Kalochorion
2012–13	Machitis Terpsithea (1)	-	-	PAOL Averof
2013–14	Dimitra Giannoulis (1)	-	-	Astrapi Nea Politeia
2014–15	Ampeloniakos (2)	-	-	Apollon Larissa
2015–16	Apollon Larissa (5)	-	-	Larissa 2012
2016–17	Achilleas Farsala (8)	-	-	Iraklis Larissa
2017–18	Oikonomos Tsaritsani (2)	-	-	AE Kileler
2018–19	Iraklis Larissa (3)	-	-	PAOL Averof
2019–20	Aetos Makrychori (2)	-	-	Dimitra Giannoulis & Olympos Gonnoi
2020–21	not awarded	-	-	not awarded
2021–22	Dotieas Agias (3)	-	-	Appollon Larissa
2022-23	Achilleas Farsala (9)	-	-	Daphne Glafkis
2023-24	Iraklis Halki (8)	-	-	Doxa Argyropouli
2024-25	Iraklis Larissa (4)	-	-	PAOL Averof
2025-26	TBD	-	-	TBD

=== Performance by club ===
Note: Bold indicates clubs currently playing in the top division of Larissa Football Clubs Association.

Club	Titles	Winning years	Group titles
**Achilleas Farsala**	9	1970, 1971, 1973, 1976, 1981, 1996, 2003, 2017, 2023	4 (1976, 1978, 1979, 1981)
Iraklis Halki	7	1967, 1968, 1982, 1989, 1995, 1997, 2001, 2024	1 (1982)
Apollon Larissa	5	1964, 1972, 1974, 1979, 2016	3 (1978, 1979, 1981)
A.E. Tyrnavos	4	1969, 1978, 1983, 1987	5 (1978, 1980, 1981, 1983, 1986)
Anthoupoli Larissa	4	1975, 1977, 1980, 1994	3 (1975, 1977, 1980)
Iraklis Larissa	4	1999, 2000, 2019, 2025	-
Dotieas Agias	3	1986, 2012, 2022	1 (1985)
Larisaikos	3	1961, 1962, 1984	1 (1984)
Anaplasis Tyrnavos	2	1963, 1965	-
Ampeloniakos	2	2011, 2015	2 (1979, 1982)
Falaniakos	2	1993, 2002	1 (1980)
PO Elassona	2	1988, 2009	2 (1976, 1977)
Oikonomos Tsaritsani	2	2010, 2018	1 (1985)
Aetos Makrychorion	2	1990, 2020	–
Toxotis Larissa	1	1986	2 (1984, 1986)
Pineios Larissa	1	1992	–
Olympos Larissa	1	1966	–
Ampelokipoi Larissa	1	1991	–
Tyrnavos 2005	1	2007	–
Pyrgetos	1	2008	–
Machitis Terpsithea	1	2013	–
AO Nees Karyes	1	1998	–
Filoktitis Melivia	1	2004	–
Kissavos Sykourion	1	2005	–
AE Dimos Nikeas	1	2006	–
Atromitos Vamvakous	0	–	1 (1983)

== Cup ==
=== Finals ===
Year	Winner	Runner-up	Result	Venue	Attendance
2006	Iraklis Halki	Tyrnavos 2005	1–1, pen. 4–3	Alcazar Stadium	
2007	Iraklis Halki	Filoktitis Melivoia	1–1, aet 3–2	Alcazar Stadium	
2008	Pyrgetos	Ampeloniakos	2–0	Alcazar Stadium	
2009	Tyrnavos 2005	Apollon Larissa	0–0, 5–4 (penalties)	Alcazar Stadium	
2010	Pyrgetos	Dotieas Agias	2–0	Alcazar Stadium	
2011	P.O. Elassona	Keravnos Parapotamos	2–0	Alcazar Stadium	1,500
2012	Ampeloniakos	Doxa Argyropouli	1–0	Tyrnavos Ground	
2013	Dimitra Giannoulis	Apollon Larissa	3–0	AEL FC Arena	1,500
2014	Dimitra Giannoulis	Doxa Vlachogianni	2–1	AEL FC Arena	
2015	Ampeloniakos	Achilleas Farsala	1–0	AEL FC Arena	2,500
2016	Apollon Larissa	Achilleas Farsala	2–1	AEL FC Arena	3,000
2017	Achilleas Farsala	Dotieas Agias	3–2 (a.e.t.)	Alcazar Stadium	1,500
2018	Oikonomos Tsaritsani	Achilleas Farsala	1–0	Alcazar Stadium	
2019	P.O. Elassona	Damasiakos	0–0 (7-6 p)	Filippoupoli Ground	2,000
2020	Falaniakos (awarded by draw)	Oikonomos Tsaritsani	n/a	not played	
2021	not awarded				
2022	Achilleas Farsala	Iraklis Larissa	0–0 (9-8 p)	Alcazar Stadium	1,500

== Super Cup ==
=== Finals ===
Year	Winner	Runner-up	Result
2006	Iraklis Halki	AED Nikea	2–2, 4–2 (penalties)
2007	Tyrnavos 2005	Iraklis Halki	2–1
2009	Tyrnavos 2005	P.S. Elassona	2–1
2010	Pyrgetos	Oikonomos Tsaritsani	3–2
2011	Ampeloniakos	PO Elassona	2–1
2012	Dotieas Agias	Ampeloniakos	2–2, 4–2 (penalties)
2013	Machitis Terpsithea	Dimitra Giannoulis	0–0, 3–1 (penalties)
2014	Dimitra Giannoulis	Doxa Vlachogianni	3–1
2019	Iraklis Larissa	PO Elassona	1–1 (3-0 p)
2022	Dotieas Agias	PO Elassona	postponed

=== Performance by club ===
Club	Winner	Runner-up
Tyrnavos 2005	2007, 2009	-
Iraklis Halki	2006	2007
Ampeloniakos	2011	2012
Dimitra Giannoulis	2013	2014
Iraklis Larissa	2019	-
Machitis Terpsithea	2013	-
Dotieas Agia	2013	-
Pyrgetos	2010	-
PO Elassona	-	2011, 2019
AED Nikeas	-	2006
Doxa Vlachogianni	-	2014
P.S. Elassona	-	2009
Oikonomos Tsaritsani	-	2010

== Koukoulitsios–Mousiaris tournament ==
The tournament started in 1994 in commemoration of football players Dimitrios Koukoulitsios and Dimitrios Mousiaris who died in a car accident in 1979. It is normally held every September before the opening of the season. Apollon Larissa is the club with most trophies. The tournament returned in 2023 after a 10-year hiatus.

=== Finals ===
- 2008: Apollon Larissa - Larisaikos 2–0
- 2009: Voukefalas - Larisaikos 3–1
- 2010: Olympos Larissa - AEL U–17 1–0
- 2011: Olympos Larissa - Iraklis Larissa 2–0
- 2012: Machitis Terpsithea - PAOL Averof 3–2
- 2013: Iraklis Larissa - PAOL Averof 3–1
- 2023: tournament was not concluded
- 2024: Iraklis Larissa - Damasiakos FC 1-0
- 2025: Falaniakos - Omonoia Larissa 2-1
- 2026: Apollon Larissa - Falaniakos 2-1

== Teams in national divisions ==
For the 2026–27 season, four teams participate in national divisions:

- Super League 2 (second tier):
  - AEL
- Gamma Ethniki (third tier):
  - Elassona
  - Anthoupoli
  - Iraklis Larissa
