= Falaniakos =

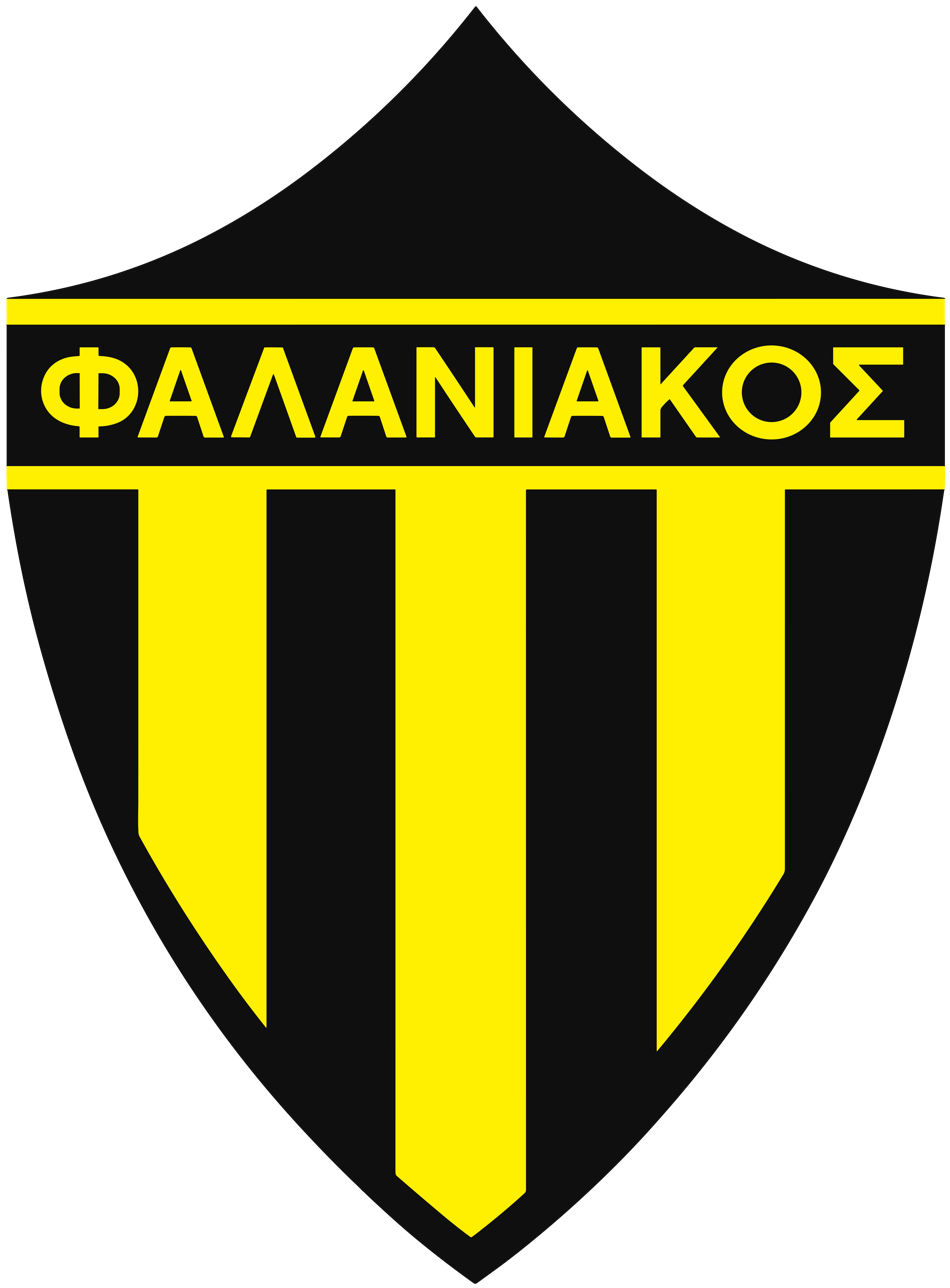
- Full name: Falaniakos Athletic Club
- Founded: 1960; 66 years ago
- Ground: Falani Municipal Ground
- Capacity: 500
- President: Kostas Ligouras
- Manager: Giannis Siarkos
- League: Larissa FCA First Division
- 2025–26: Larissa FCA First Division, 8th
Home colours	Away colours

Falaniakos A.C. (Greek: Φαλανιακός Α.Σ.) is a local football (soccer) club based in Falani in Larissa, Greece that was created in 1960. In 1991, Falaniakos participated in the national Fourth Division for a couple of seasons and now it currently participates in the first division of the prefectural Larissa Football Clubs Association. Their team colours are yellow and black.

== History ==
In the 1920s and the 1930s, youngsters from Falani participated in the soccer club under the name "Falaniakos" and played friendly matches with teams from other areas and it did not have an official character. Falaniakos was formed in 1960 under the name "AC Falaniakos Falanis" and started to play in local championships and later played in higher divisions and entered the first local division in 1970.

== Titles, Second Place and Elevations ==
- 1961-62: Winner of the Larissa FCA Third Division.
- 1963-64: Winner of the Larissa FCA Second Division
- 1964-69: Winner of the Larissa FCA Second Division
- 1971-72: Finalist of the Larissa FCA Cup.
- 1976-77: Second Place of the Larissa FCA Premier Division, elevated to the National Third Division
- 1978-79: Larissa FCA Cup - Finalist
- 1979-80: Winner of the Larissa FCA Premier Division
- 1990-91: Second Place of the Larissa FCA, elevated to the National Fourth Division
- 1992-93: Champions of the Larissa FCA, elevated again to the National Fourth Division
- 2001-02: Championship of the Larissa FCA, returned to the National Fourth Division
- 2002-03: Cup winner of the Larissa FCA

== In national divisions ==
- In the 1977-78 season, as second place of the prefectural championship, elevated into the today's third division (then National Amateur Division. It was the highest category that Falaniakos participated. Falaniakos finished 15th with 28 points (40-68 goals) and relegated to the locals.
- In the 1991-92 season, as second place of the prefectural championship, elevated into the fourth division and was later relegated
- In the 1993-94 season, as champion of Larissa FCA, returned to the fourth division
- In the 2002-03 season, as champion of Larissa FCA, returned again to the fourth division and it last participation to date.

== Notable players ==
- (Greece) Takis Parafestas
- (Greece) Nikos Kakakoulias
- (Greece) Dimitris Koutsoukis
- (Greece) Stelios Chasiotis
- (Greece) Tasos Kastanoulias
- (Greece) Adam Lygouras
- (Greece) Giannis Kakavitsis
- (Greece) Vassilis Ziogas
- (Greece) Giannis Igglezos
- (Greece) Kostas Tsiakos
