= Tyrnavos 2005 F.C. =

Tyrnavos 2005
- Full name: Tyrnavos 2005 Football Club
- Founded: 2005; 21 years ago
- Ground: Tyrnavos Stadium
- Capacity: 1,500
- Chairman: Theodoros Gounis
- Manager: Evangelos Tziolas
- League: Larissa FCA First Division
- 2025–26: Larissa FCA Second Division (Group 1), 1st, (promoted)
Home colours	Away colours

Tyrnavos 2005 Football Club (Greek: Α.Ο. Τύρναβος 2005) is a Greek football club, based in Tyrnavos, Larissa regional unit.

== History ==
The club was founded in 2005 after the merge of local clubs Niki Tyrnavos and AE Tyrnavos. In 2007 they won promotion to Delta Ethniki under coach Takis Parafestas. They were champions of Group 4 of Delta Ethniki for 2009-10 season and promoted to Gamma Ethniki. During 2013 and 2015 the club participated in Beta Ethniki.

=== Notable players ===
- (Greece) Anastasios Kyriakos
- (Greece) Konstantinos Kourtesiotis
- (Greece) Dimitrios Kolovetsios
- (Greece) Alexandros Galitsios
- (Cameroon) Moussa Pokong

=== Notable coaches ===
- (Greece) Michalis Ziogas
- (Greece) Takis Parafestas
- (Greece) Nikos Papanikolaou

== Honours ==
=== National ===
- Delta Ethniki (1): 2009–10

=== Regional ===
- Larissa FCA First Division (1): 2006–07
- Larissa FCA Cup (1): 2008–09
- Larissa FCA Super Cup (1): 2007
