= AEL FC Arena =

Football stadium in Larissa, Greece

- Interactive map of AEL FC Arena
- Full name: AEL FC Arena
- Location: Larissa, Greece
- Coordinates: 39°36′55″N 22°23′57″E
- Owner: Gipedo Larissa A.E.
- Operator: AEL
- Capacity: 17,118 (expandable to 33,000)
- Executive suites: 38
- Surface: Grass
- Scoreboard: 2 LED
- Field size: 105 x 68 m
- Public transit: Larissa railway station

Construction
- Groundbreaking: May 2009
- Built: September 2009 – November 2010
- Opened: 23 November 2010
- Cost: €51 million
- Architect: Potiropoulos D+L architects S.A.
- Structural engineer: Ntontos ATE - Katharios ATEVE - ERGO3 ATTEE

Tenants
- A.E. Larissa (2010–2013, 2015–2020, 2023–); Apollon Larissa (2020–2021); Iraklis Larissa (2021–2023)

Website
- AEL FC Arena

AEL FC Arena is a football stadium in Larissa, Greece, with a current seating capacity of 17,118 which can be expanded to 33,000. Since its completion in 2010 and for 8 seasons, it is the home ground of AΕL. Owner of the ground is Gipedo Larissa A.E.

The stadium was developed in a total of 144,000 square meters in the Mezourlo Hill, district of Neapolis, Larissa. Construction of the stadium started in September 2009 and was completed in November 2010. According to UEFA stadium categories, AEL FC Arena is rated as category three of four, (renamed from elite) in ascending ranking order.

The seating capacity is 17,118 all covered, with the possibility to expand to 33,000 seats making it the 3rd largest Stadium in Greece. It also includes 38 VIP boxes, for 12 spectators each. The stadium complex, called Crimson Park, includes parking lots for 1,104 vehicles, commercial spaces, a movie theater, and a 1,500-seat open-air theater, 12 tennis courts and lies near the Neapolis Indoor Hall. The new sports venue is ideally located - regarding the urban location - with a fair accession in the transport system and has good accessibility from two main motorways and proximity to the city's center.

The stadium was inaugurated on 23 November, followed by a concert by Filippos Pliatsikas (himself a fan of the team) and Dionysis Tsaknis.

== History ==
The first football match at AEL FC Arena took place on December 5, 2010, in the framework of its 13th Super League game 2010–11, in the match between AEL FC and PAOK FC, which ended with a score of 1–2. The first goal scored on the field came at 11' by PAOK's Chilean footballer, Pablo Contreras.

== Gallery ==
Aerial view

External view

Smoke machines in operation

Stands of AEL FC Arena

Stands of AEL FC Arena
