= Atromitos Palamas F.C. =

Atromitos Palamas
- Full name: A.S. Atromitos Palama F.C.
- Founded: 1952; 74 years ago
- Ground: New Atromitos Palamas Stadium
- Capacity: 533
- Chairman: Christos Sapountzis
- Manager: Thanos Triantafyllopoulos
- League: Karditsa FCA First Division
- 2025–26: Karditsa FCA First Division, 2nd

Atromitos Palama Football Club (Greek: Αθλητικός Σύλλογος Ατρόμητος Παλαμά) is a Greek football club based in Palamas, Karditsa, Greece.

== Honours ==
=== Domestic ===
  - Karditsa FCA Champions: 11
    - 1970–71, 1971–72, 1972–73, 1974–75, 1981–82, 1984–85, 1991–92, 1995–96, 2014–15, 2018–19, 2023–24
  - Karditsa FCA Cup Winners: 13
    - 1971–72, 1972–73, 1973–74, 1978–79, 1982–83, 1992–93, 1995–96, 1996–97, 2019–20, 2021–22, 2022–23, 2023–24, 2025–26
  - Karditsa FCA Super Cup Winners: 1
    - 2015
