= Iraklis Larissa =

Association football club in Greece

- Full name: Athlitiki Enosi Iraklis Larissa
- Nickname: Κυανόλευκοι (The Blue-whites)
- Founded: 1930; 96 years ago
- Ground: Athletic Center Neapoli Larissa
- Chairman: Maria Kostouli
- Manager: Christos Chatziiliadis
- League: Gamma Ethniki
- 2025–26: Larissa FCA First Division, 1st (promoted)
- Website: https://www.iraklislarisas.gr/
Home colours	Away colours

Iraklis Larissa (Greek: Ηρακλής Λάρισας), also known by its full name Athlitiki Enosi Iraklis Larissa (Greek: Αθλητική Ένωση Ηρακλής Λάρισας), simply called Iraklis, is a Greek football club based in the city of Larissa.

== History ==
=== Early years ===
Iraklis Larissa was founded in 1930 in the district of Neapoli in Larissa. Its first president was Petros Papakonstantinou. Iraklis was the fifth team of the city to be recognized by the Thessaly Football Clubs Association after Pelasgiotida, the Excursion Club, Aris Larissa and Dimitra Larissa (known today as Apollon). They also participated in the first championship of 1930–31. In 1960, Iraklis also became one of the founding members of Union Football Association of Larissa.

On 7 December 1947, Iraklis won 2–1 against Niki Volos and won the Thessalian Cup, thus qualifying for the Greek Cup. They made it to the quarterfinals in which they eventually lost 0–6 against Olympiacos. Iraklis were the first team from Larissa to make it to the round of eight.

In the seasons 1962–63 and 1963–64, Iraklis played in the Beta Ethniki.

=== Founding of AEL ===
After the idea was in the planning since 1958, Iraklis alongside Toxotis Larissa, Aris Larissa and Larisaikos merged in 1964 to form AEL. The newly formed team eventually went on to write Greek football history for being the only team outside the two major cities, Athens and Thessaloniki, to win the championship, as well as winning two Greek cups. Iraklis' president Kostas Tzovaridis became the first president of the newly founded AEL.

=== Modern era ===
For the next 18 years there was no presence of Iraklis in football. But, Iraklis was re-founded in 1982, after the merge of two neighbouring clubs in: Livadaki A.O. (founded in 1976) and A.O. Neapoli. Iraklis quickly climbed up the ladder of Larissa FCA divisions, winning promotion to the national Delta Ethniki in 1989. During the '90s was competing every season in the Greek fourth tier and also made it to the 1996 Final of the Greek Football Amateur Cup losing to Ethnikos Katerini by 2-1.

In the 2000s the club was playing in the local divisions of Larissa FCA. In 2010 Iraklis starting from the Greek 8th tier with Vangelis Kotsios as a manager won back-to-back promotions. After several years of struggle, local businessman Lampros Ioakim took over the reins of Iraklis as president leading the club to win the 2016–17 Larissa FCA A1 season (Greek sixth tier). Ioakim put a lot of importance and focus into the development of a youth center in order to develop players that would lead the team in the upcoming years.

Having won the 2018–19 Larissa FCA First Division (fifth tier), Iraklis returned to the Gamma Ethniki after several decades. The conditions now seemed ripe for the return of Iraklis to the professional leagues under coaching by the young duo Christos Chatziliadis and Thanos Triantafyllopoulos. The staffing of the sports department with an alloy of experienced and very young and talented football players from the academy revolved around the club's philosophy.

Iraklis earned promotion to 2nd tier Beta Ethniki and competed for one season (2022–23) using the AEL FC Arena as its home. It was its first season in the Greek 2nd tier for first time since 1963-64. After the club's relegation in 2023, Iraklis opted to play in the Larissa FCA first division instead of the Gamma Ethniki.

== Honours ==
- Gamma Ethniki
  - Group Winners (1): 2021–22
- Larissa FCA
  - Winners (4): 1998–99, 1999–00, 2018–19, 2025–26
  - Runners-up (1): 2017–18
- Larissa FCA A1
  - Winners (1): 2016–17
  - Runners-up (1): 2012–13
- Larissa FCA Beta
  - Winners (1): 2011–12
- Larissa FCA Gamma
  - Winners (1): 2010–11
- Greek Football Amateur Cup
  - Runners-up (1): 1995–96
- Larissa FCA Cup
  - Winners (2): 1995–96, 2024–25
  - Runners-up (7): 1986–87, 1989–90, 1994–95, 1996–97, 1997–98, 2021–22, 2025–26
- Larissa FCA Super Cup
  - Winners (2): 2019, 2025
- Thessaly FCA Cup
  - Winners (1): 1946–47

== Players ==
=== Notable players ===
- (Greece) Kostas Katsaras
- (Greece) Thomas Makris
- (Greece) Nikos Goulios
- (Greece) Ilias Kotsios
- (Greece) Giannis Valaniadis
- (Greece) Konstantinos Nebegleras
- (Greece) Petros Karanastasis
- (Greece) Vangelis Kotsios
- (Greece) Rizos Lellis
- (Uruguay) Diego Casas
- (Argentina) Lucas Bossio
- (Greece) Konstantinos Chatzis
- (Greece) Dimitrios Chasomeris
- (Argentina) Lucas García

== Coaches ==
- (Greece) Nikos Vlahoulis
- (Greece) Giannis Papagiannis
- (Greece) Christos Andreoudis
- (Greece) Vangelis Kotsios (2010-2012)
- (Greece) Thanasis Tsotsos (2012–2013)
- (Greece) Kostas Kolomitrousis (2013–2014)
- (Greece) Takis Parafestas (2014)
- (Greece) Giannis Tsakmakidis (2015–2018)
- (Greece) Christos Chatziliadis (2018–2022)
- (Greece) Panagiotis Dilberis (2022)
- (Greece) Christos Chatziliadis (2022–2023)
- (Greece) Thanos Triantafyllopoulos (2023-present)

== Chairmen ==
- (Greece) Giorgos Filippou
- (Greece) Giorgos Architektonidis
- (Greece) Thomas Filippou
- (Greece) Lampros Ioakim (2016–2023)

== Ground ==
Iraklis used to play at the Alcazar Stadium in the city of Larissa until 1964. After its refounding, the club has played its home games at the Neapolis complex. During 2021-23 it's home was the AEL FC Arena.

== Basketball section ==
Iraklis founded a basketball department in the 1952-53 season playing its home games at an open court in the town's main high school. The club played games against arch rivals Aris Larissa, historic G.S. Larissa and other opponents in Thessaly. It was dissolved in 1959.
