= 2022–23 Greek Football Cup =

2022–23 Greek Cup
Novibet Greek Cup

Tournament details
- Country: Greece
- Teams: 85

Final positions
- Champions: AEK Athens (16th title)
- Runners-up: PAOK

Tournament statistics
- Matches played: 91
- Goals scored: 269 (2.96 per match)
- Top goal scorer(s): Brandon Thomas (5 goals)

The 2022–23 Greek Football Cup, also named Novibet Greek Cup for sponsorship reasons, was the 81st edition of the Greek Football Cup. The winner of the Cup will qualify for the next season's Europa League third qualifying round.

Match times up to 30 October 2022 and from 26 March 2023 were EEST (UTC+3). Times on interim ("winter") days were EET (UTC+2).

== Calendar ==
| Round | Date(s) | Fixtures | Clubs | New entries | Leagues entering |
|---|---|---|---|---|---|
| First Round | 31 August & 1, 14 September 2022 | 22 | 85 → 62 | 45 | Local Cup Winners |
| Second Round | 21, 25 September 2022 | 9 | 62 → 52 | none | none |
| Third Round | 28 September & 5 October 2022 | 16 | 52 → 35 | 26 | Super League 2 |
| Fourth Round | 8, 9 & 12 October 2022 | 6 | 35 → 29 | none | none |
| Fifth Round | 18–20 October 2022 | 12 | 29 → 16 | 10 | Super League 1, places 5–14 |
| Round of 16 | 14–16 December 2022 & 10–12 January 2023 | 16 | 16 → 8 | 4 | Super League 1, places 1–4 |
| Quarter-finals | 18, 25, 26 January 2023 | 8 | 8 → 4 | none | none |
| Semi-finals | 9 February, 18 March & 12, 13 April 2023 | 4 | 4 → 2 | none | none |
| Final | 24 May 2023 | 1 | 2 → 1 | none | none |

== Qualifying rounds ==
=== First round ===
The draw took place on 24 August 2022.

==== Summary ====
| Team 1 | Score | Team 2 |
|---|---|---|
31 August 2022
| AO Katastariou | 0–4 | Nafpaktiakos Asteras |
| Panelefsiniakos | 1–0 | Apollon Agios Ioannis |
| Aris Voulas | 3–0 (w/o) | AO Nea Artaki |
| Tilikratis | 3–0 | Molaikos |
| Ermis Meligous | 5–0 | Pankamariakos |
| Apollon Eupaliou | 1–0 | Foinix Neas Epidavrou |
| Panargiakos Argous Orestikou | 0–4 | Apollon Paralimnio |
| AE Kalampakiou | 0–4 | Ionikos Ionias |
| Aetos Varvara | 3–3 (4–5 p) | PAOK Kristonis |
| Vyron Kavalas | 2–0 | Anagennisi Giannitsa |
| Panthrakikos | 1–0 | PO Alexandroupolis |
| Asteras Tripotamou | 4–1 | Aris Petinou |
| P.O. Elassona | 3–1 | Atromitos Palama |
| Vataniakos | 0–0 (4–2 p) | A.O. Ypato |
| P.O. Fiki | 3–0 | Pyrasos |
| AEP Kozani | 6–1 | Anagennisi Arta |
| PAO Koutseliou | 1–2 (a.e.t.) | Asteras Petriti |
| AE Neas Selefkias | 0–2 | Asteras Stavrou |
| Panthouriakos | 0–1 (a.e.t.) | Diagoras Vrachnaiika |
| Poseidon Kardamylon | 0–7 | AER Afantou |
1 September 2022
| Pallixouriakos | 1–5 | Pamvouprasiakos |
14 September 2022
| Aetos Loutron | 2–5 | Almyros Gaziou |
| Ermis Zoniana | 1–3 | Ilioupoli |
N/A
| A.O. Agios Nikolaos | bye | |

==== Matches ====
31 August 2022
16:30 EEST

| AO Katastariou | 0–4 | Nafpaktiakos Asteras |
|---|---|---|
| | Report | Karalis 45+1'; Georgousopoulos 46'; Pappas 49' (o.g.); Pantazis 89' |

Machairado Municipal Stadium, Machairado
Referee: Ilias Rekkas (Messinia)

31 August 2022
17:00 EEST

| Panelefsiniakos | 1–0 | Apollon Agios Ioannis |
|---|---|---|
| Kritikos 17' | Report |

Megara Municipal Stadium, Megara
Referee: Athanasios Zacharopoulos (East Attica)

31 August 2022
17:30 EEST

| Aris Voulas | 3–0 (Awarded) | AO Nea Artaki |
|---|---|---|
| | Report |

Voula Municipal Stadium, Voula
Referee: Epaminondas Kolorizos (Phthiotis)

31 August 2022
17:30 EEST

| Tilikratis | 3–0 | Molaikos |
|---|---|---|
| Skiadas 16'; Gountroumpis 79'; Kyriakidis 90' | Report |

Lefkada Stadium, Lefkada
Referee: Panagiotis Tsioris (Arta)

31 August 2022
17:30 EEST

| Ermis Meligous | 5–0 | Pankamariakos |
|---|---|---|
| Iatridis 17', 29'; Kollias 39'; Warden 78'; Vlachos 89' | Report |

Astrous Cynuria Municipal Stadium, Meligos
Referee: Ioannis Papageorgopoulos (Argolida)

31 August 2022
17:30 EEST

| Apollon Eupaliou | 1–0 | Foinix Neas Epidavrou |
|---|---|---|
| Fousekis 45' | Report |

Malamata Municipal Stadium, Malamata
Referee: Stefanos Xirogiannis (Boeotia)

31 August 2022
17:30 EEST

| Panargiakos Argous Orestikou | 0–4 | Apollon Paralimnio |
|---|---|---|
| | Report | Georgiadis 12' (pen.), 45'; Karyofyllis 40'; Koutzavasilis 52' |

Argos Orestiko Municipal Stadium, Argos Orestiko
Referee: Loukas Rigopoulos (Imathia)

31 August 2022
17:30 EEST

| AE Kalampakiou | 0–4 | Ionikos Ionias |
|---|---|---|
| | Report | Politis 11', 76'; Murrja 61'; Kechagias 90+3' |

Eps Drama Stadium, Drama
Referee: Georgios-Rafail Drakidis (Xanthi)

31 August 2022
17:30 EEST

| Aetos Varvara | 3–3 (a.e.t.) | PAOK Kristonis |
|---|---|---|
| Kechagias 47'; Vlachakis 90+4'; Efstathiou 104' | Report | Romanidis 32', 90'; Belitsas 98' |
Penalties
| Penalty scored Penalty missed | 4–5 | (penalty scored) G. Ioannidis; (penalty scored) Belitsas; (penalty scored) Matentzidis; (penalty scored) Chatziaslanidis; (penalty scored) Efthimiadis |

Varvara Stadium, Varvara
Referee: Konstantinos Tikitzoglou (Macedonia)

31 August 2022
17:30 EEST

| Vyron Kavalas | 2–0 | Anagennisi Giannitsa |
|---|---|---|
| Pantelidis 43'; Sidiropoulos 90+4' | Report |

Anthi Karagianni Stadium, Kavala
Referee: Dimitris Kefalas (Serres)

31 August 2022
17:30 EEST

| Panthrakikos | 1–0 | PO Alexandroupolis |
|---|---|---|
| Vaskos 68' (pen.) | Report |

Komotini Municipal Stadium, Komotini
Referee: Anastasia Mylopoulou (Kavala)

31 August 2022
17:30 EEST

| Asteras Tripotamou | 4–1 | Aris Petinou |
|---|---|---|
| Tasionas 59', 90'; Dogos 74'; Pipiliaris 80' | Report | Papadopoulos 29' (o.g.) |

Municipal Stadium of Naousa, Naousa
Referee: Apostolos-Vasilis Argyros (Pella)

31 August 2022
17:30 EEST

| P.O. Elassona | 3–1 | Atromitos Palama |
|---|---|---|
| Moultsias 13', 39'; Pantazis 90+2' | Report | Paraschis 41' |

Alcazar Stadium, Larissa
Referee: Giorgos Tasiopoulos (Thessaly)

31 August 2022
17:30 EEST

| Vataniakos | 0–0 (a.e.t.) | A.O. Ypato |
|---|---|---|
| | Report |
Penalties
| Tsikaderis (penalty scored); Papadopoulos (penalty scored); Tsiomis (penalty scored); Pardalis (penalty missed); Liolios (penalty scored) | 4–2 | (penalty missed) Drougas; (penalty missed) Polyzos; (penalty scored) Potouridis; (penalty scored) Penta |

Vatan Municipal Stadium, Katerini
Referee: Konstantinos Dimeras (Larissa)

31 August 2022
17:30 EEST

| P.O. Fiki | 3–0 | Pyrasos |
|---|---|---|
| Skondras 36' (pen.), 39', 41' | Report |

Fiki Municipal Stadium, Pyli
Referee: Dimitris Margiolas (Karditsa)

31 August 2022
17:30 EEST

| AEP Kozani | 6–1 | Anagennisi Arta |
|---|---|---|
| Koulousias 10'; Michailidis 36'; Kaliakatsos 41' (o.g.); Salla 57'; Tselepis 77', 83' | Report | Christogiannis 57' |

Kozani Stadium, Kozani
Referee: Nikos Mangioros (Epirus)

31 August 2022
17:30 EEST

| PAO Koutseliou | 1–2 (a.e.t.) | Asteras Petriti |
|---|---|---|
| Klitsinaris 89' | Report | Marcon 14'; Christogiannis 108' |

EPS Epirus Stadium, Ioannina
Referee: Angelos Tsanis (Kozani)

31 August 2022
17:30 EEST

| AE Neas Selefkias | 0–2 | Asteras Stavrou |
|---|---|---|
| | Report | Kakkavas 104'; Chantzis 106' |

Nea Selefkia Municipal Stadium, Nea Selefkia
Referee: Georgios Fitsas (Corfu)

31 August 2022
17:30 EEST

| Panthouriakos | 0–1 (a.e.t.) | Diagoras Vrachnaiika |
|---|---|---|
| | Report | Golfinopoulos 107' |

Messiniakos Stadium, Kalamata
Referee: Georgios Bosnos (Arcadia)

31 August 2022
17:30 EEST

| Poseidon Kardamylon | 0–7 | AER Afantou |
|---|---|---|
| | Report | Nikitas 22' (pen.); Spahiu 30', 44'; Arfaras 45'; Korlos 54'; Tellidis 59' (o.g.); Apostolakis 90' |

Chios Municipal Stadium, Chios
Referee: Ioannis Gaitatzis (Athens)

1 September 2022
12:00 EEST

| Pallixouriakos | 1–5 | Pamvouprasiakos |
|---|---|---|
| Mbrat 75' | Report | Lathyris 23', 42', 55', 85'; Antonopoulos 30' |

Agios Antonios Municipal Stadium, Lixouri
Referee: Konstantinos Oikonomou (Achaea)

14 September 2022
17:30 EEST

| Aetos Loutron | 2–5 | Almyros Gaziou |
|---|---|---|
| Michalakis 5' (pen.); Sefullaj 77' | Report | Fragoulakis 9'; Dionisio 46'; Piergiácomi 93'; Katsikokeris 95'; Hajdini 155' |

Loutra Lesbos Municipal Stadium, Loutra Lesbos
Referee: Marios Kapiris (Athens)

14 September 2022
16:30 EEST

| Ermis Zoniana | 1–3 | Ilioupoli |
|---|---|---|
| Baboulakis 14' | Report | Kreci 1'; Vasiliou 33', 48' |

Zoniana Municipal Stadium, Zoniana
Referee: Nikos Georgopoulos (Chania)

=== Second round ===
The draw took place on 8 September 2022. Former Greek professional footballer and current manager, Tasos Tasiopoulos, made the draw using a manually operated lotery ball cage.

==== Summary ====
| Team 1 | Score | Team 2 |
|---|---|---|
21 September 2022
| Asteras Tripotamou | 0–3 (w/o) | Ionikos Ionias |
| Vyron Kavalas | 1–0 | P.O. Fiki |
| Asteras Stavrou | 3–2 (a.e.t.) | Vataniakos |
| Asteras Petriti | 0–0 (2–4 p) | Apollon Paralimnio |
| AER Afantou | 0–1 | Diagoras Vrachnaiika |
| Ilioupoli | 7–0 | Ermis Meligous |
| AEP Kozani | 1–2 | P.O. Elassona |
| Pamvouprasiakos | 0–2 | Panelefsiniakos |
25 September 2022
| Aris Voulas | 0–1 | Nafpaktiakos Asteras |
| Almyros Gaziou | 1–0 | Apollon Eupaliou |
N/A
| A.O. Agios Nikolaos | bye | |
| Panthrakikos | bye | |
| PAOK Kristonis | bye | |
| Tilikratis | bye | |

==== Matches ====
21 September 2022
16:00 EEST

| Asteras Tripotamou | 0–3 (Awarded) | Ionikos Ionias |
|---|---|---|
| | Report |

Tripotamos Municipal Stadium, Tripotamos, Imathia

21 September 2022
16:00 EEST

| Vyron Kavalas | 1–0 | P.O. Fiki |
|---|---|---|
| Naoumidis 37' | Report |

Veroulio Stadium, Ilioupoli
Referee: Dimitris Gaitatzidis (Drama)

21 September 2022
16:00 EEST

| Asteras Stavrou | 3–2 (a.e.t.) | Vataniakos |
|---|---|---|
| Chantzis 89' (pen.), 90+8'; Fountas 120' | Report | G. Papadopoulos 14'; Mitrakas 62' |

Stavros Municipal Stadium, Stavros
Referee: Panagiotis Zygas (Aetoloacarnania)

21 September 2022
16:00 EEST

| Asteras Petriti | 0–0 (a.e.t.) | Apollon Paralimnio |
|---|---|---|
| | Report |
Penalties
| Polyzos (penalty scored); Marcon (penalty missed); Gardikiotis (penalty missed); Thireo (penalty scored) | 2–4 | (penalty scored) Liaras; (penalty scored) Goumas; (penalty scored) Elezi; (penalty scored) Georgiadis |

Eps Kerkyra Ground, Petriti
Referee: Leonidas Tzovas (Epirus)

21 September 2022
16:00 EEST

| AER Afantou | 0–1 | Diagoras Vrachnaiika |
|---|---|---|
| | Report | Barlas 90+3' |

Afantou Municipal Stadium, Afantou
Referee: Spyros Nikolaou (Athens)

21 September 2022
16:15 EEST

| Ilioupoli | 7–0 | Ermis Meligous |
|---|---|---|
| Dimitriadis 22', 56'; Varkas 23'; Bastakos 47'; Triantafyllakos 66', 87'; Georgiadis 78' | Report |

Ilioupoli Municipal Stadium, Ilioupoli
Referee: Kostas Damianakis (Piraeus)

21 September 2022
16:00 EEST

| AEP Kozani | 1–2 | P.O. Elassona |
|---|---|---|
| Koulousias 15' | Report | Kontothanasis 25', 45+1' |

Kozani Stadium, Kozani
Referee: Dimos Tzamos (Kastoria)

21 September 2022
16:00 EEST

| Pamvouprasiakos | 0–2 | Panelefsiniakos |
|---|---|---|
| | Report | Kakosimos 84'; Kritikos 90' |

Grigorios Kalakos Stadium, Varda
Referee: Dimitris Vartsakis (Laconia)

25 September 2022
16:15 EEST

| Aris Voulas | 0–1 | Nafpaktiakos Asteras |
|---|---|---|
| | Report | Petratos 45+3' |

Voula Municipal Stadium, Voula
Referee: Vangelis Lathyris (Piraeus)

25 September 2022
16:15 EEST

| Almyros Gaziou | 1–0 | Apollon Eupaliou |
|---|---|---|
| Katsikokeris 5' | Report |

Gazi Municipal Stadium, Heraklion
Referee: Nikos Trigas (Chania)

=== Third round ===
The draw took place on 20 September 2022. Former Albanian international, Bledar Kola, made the draw using a manually operated lottery ball cage.

==== Summary ====
| Team 1 | Score | Team 2 |
|---|---|---|
28 September 2022
| Apollon Larissa | 3–0 (w/o) | Ergotelis |
| A.O. Agios Nikolaos | 0–0 (4–3 p) | Episkopi |
| Kalamata | 1–0 | Proodeftiki |
| Veria | 2–1 (a.e.t.) | Chania |
| Tilikratis | 1–1 (4–5 p) | OF Ierapetra |
| Iraklis | 0–0 (4–5 p) | Niki Volos |
| Ilioupoli | 1–2 | Athens Kallithea |
2 October 2022
| Vyron Kavalas | 0–5 | Panachaiki |
| Ionikos Ionias | 1–0 | Diagoras Vrachnaiika |
| Apollon Smyrnis | 0–2 | A.E. Kifisia |
| Almyros Gaziou | 3–1 | P.O. Elassona |
| Nafpaktiakos Asteras | 1–2 | AEL |
| PAOK Kristonis | 2–3 | Panthrakikos |
5 October 2022
| Makedonikos | 0–1 (a.e.t.) | Anagennisi Karditsa |
| Egaleo | 1–2 (a.e.t.) | Panserraikos |
| Diagoras | 0–0 (3–5 p) | Apollon Pontus |
| Asteras Stavrou | 0–3 | Almopos Aridea |
N/A
| Panelefsiniakos | bye | |
| Apollon Paralimnio | bye | |
| Thesprotos | bye | |

==== Matches ====
28 September 2022
16:00 EEST

| Apollon Larissa | 3–0 (Awarded) | Ergotelis |

Philippoupoli Ground, Larissa

28 September 2022
16:00 EEST

| A.O. Agios Nikolaos | 0–0 (a.e.t.) | Episkopi |
Penalties
| Melissopoulos (penalty scored); Barata (penalty scored); Hysi (penalty scored); Dolapsakis (penalty missed); Foukarakis (penalty scored) | 4–3 | (penalty scored) Samurkasovi; (penalty missed) Stathopoulos; (penalty missed) Ebwelle; (penalty scored) Politis; (penalty scored) Skenderaj |

Agios Nikolaos Municipal Stadium, Agios Nikolaos
Referee: Petros Koukourakis (Chania)

28 September 2022
16:00 EEST

| Kalamata | 1–0 | Proodeftiki |
|---|---|---|
| Vasilogiannis 51' |

Kalamata Municipal Stadium, Kalamata
Referee: Aristidis Vatsios (West Attica)

28 September 2022
16:00 EEST

| Veria | 2–1 (a.e.t.) | Chania |
|---|---|---|
| Papachristos 43'; Fasidis 113' | | Lemonis 50' |

Veria Stadium, Veria
Referee: Giorgos Fitsas (West Attica)

28 September 2022
16:00 EEST

| Tilikratis | 1–1 (a.e.t.) | OF Ierapetra |
|---|---|---|
| Gountroumpis 67' | | Müller 51' |
Penalties
| Zdravos-Rizos (penalty missed); Toska (penalty scored); Bekatoros (penalty scored); Katsis (penalty missed); Souleiman (penalty scored) | 4–5 | (penalty scored) Müller; (penalty scored) Andereggen; (penalty scored) Cataldi; (penalty scored) Dettler; (penalty scored) Itsios |

Lefkada Stadium, Lefkada
Referee: Alexandros Katsikogiannis (Epirus)

28 September 2022
16:00 EEST

| Iraklis | 0–0 (a.e.t.) | Niki Volos |
Penalties
| Melunović (penalty scored); Silva (penalty scored); Tomás (penalty scored); Vitlis (penalty missed); Patralis (penalty scored); Chruściel (penalty missed) | 4–5 | (penalty missed) Tzioras; (penalty scored) Tsoukalas; (penalty scored) Kyriakidis; (penalty scored) Kassos; (penalty scored) Meçe; (penalty scored) Bruno |

Kaftanzoglio Stadium, Thessaloniki
Referee: Christos Kakoulidis (Thrace)

28 September 2022
16:00 EEST

| Ilioupoli | 1–2 | Athens Kallithea |
|---|---|---|
| Vasiliou 23' | | Loukinas 18'; Kynigopoulos 52' |

Ilioupoli Municipal Stadium, Ilioupoli
Referee: Ioannis Routsis (Corinthia)

2 October 2022
16:00 EEST

| Vyron Kavalas | 0–5 | Panachaiki |
|---|---|---|
| | | Chanti 29'; Keri 20' (pen.); P. Karaklajić 76' (pen.); N. Karaklajić 85'; Bourlakis 90+4' |

Anthi Karagianni Stadium, Kavala
Referee: Athanasios Boutsikos (Macedonia)

2 October 2022
16:00 EEST

| Ionikos Ionias | 1–0 | Diagoras Vrachnaiika |
|---|---|---|
| Koleci 55' |

Diavata Municipal Stadium, Diavata
Referee: Panagiotis Tsiaras (Kavala)

2 October 2022
16:00 EEST

| Apollon Smyrnis | 0–2 | A.E. Kifisia |
|---|---|---|
| | | Tsamouris 39' (o.g.); Tetteh 64' |

Georgios Kamaras Stadium, Rizoupoli
Referee: Andreas Vlachos (East Attica)

2 October 2022
16:15 EEST

| Almyros Gaziou | 3–1 | P.O. Elassona |
|---|---|---|
| Gjeci 56'; Bourselis 65'; Fragoulakis 69' (pen.) | | Koukoulis 3' |

Gazi Municipal Stadium, Heraklion
Referee: Rafail Stavroulakis (Rethymno)

2 October 2022
16:00 EEST

| Nafpaktiakos Asteras | 1–2 | AEL |
|---|---|---|
| Stathopoulos 80' | | Plegas 51'; Papageorgiou 63' |

Papacharalabeio Ethniko Stadio, Nafpaktos
Referee: Konstantinos Andrianos (Achaea)

2 October 2022
16:00 EEST

| PAOK Kristonis | 2–3 | Panthrakikos |
|---|---|---|
| G. Ioannidis 60'; Romanidis 63' | | Vaskos 20', 74' (pen.); Goutsidis 69' |

Kristoni Stadium, Kilkis
Referee: Konstantinos Safouris-Argyropoulos (Serres)

5 October 2022
16:00 EEST

| Makedonikos | 0–1 (a.e.t.) | Anagennisi Karditsa |
|---|---|---|
| | | Ballas 117' |

Makedonikos Stadium, Thessaloniki
Referee: Dimitris Takidis (Kilkis)

5 October 2022
16:00 EEST

| Egaleo | 1–2 | Panserraikos |
|---|---|---|
| Bastianos 35' | | Said 90+5' (pen.); Kanis 108' |

Stavros Mavrothalassitis Stadium, Aigaleo
Referee: Michalis Matsoukas (Aetoloacarnania)

5 October 2022
16:00 EEST

| Diagoras | 0–0 (a.e.t.) | Apollon Pontus |
Penalties
| Lahiouel (penalty missed); Parastatidis (penalty missed); Papaioannou (penalty scored); Magakis (penalty scored) | 2–4 | (penalty scored) Kalogeris; (penalty scored) Aravidis; (penalty scored) Aboudou; (penalty scored) Moumin |

Diagoras Stadium, Rhodes
Referee: Angelos Bakogiannis (Athens)

5 October 2022
16:00 EEST

| Asteras Stavrou | 0–3 | Almopos Aridea |
|---|---|---|
| | | Gioukoudis 4'; Papadopoulos 24'; Kollaras 62' |

Stavros Municipal Stadium, Stavros
Referee: Giannis Andrikopoulos (Cyclades)

=== Fourth round ===
The draw took place on 20 September 2022, after the Third Round draw.

==== Summary ====
| Team 1 | Score | Team 2 |
|---|---|---|
8 October 2022
| Thesprotos | 1–2 | Veria |
9 October 2022
| OF Ierapetra | 0–0 (2–4 p) | A.E. Kifisia |
| Anagennisi Karditsa | 0–0 (4–5 p) | Apollon Pontus |
| Apollon Larissa | 2–2 (5–6 p) | Athens Kallithea |
| A.O. Agios Nikolaos | 2–0 | Niki Volos |
12 October 2022
| Almyros Gaziou | 3–1 | Panthrakikos |
N/A
| Panachaiki | bye | |
| AEL | bye | |
| Panserraikos | bye | |
| Ionikos Ionias | bye | |
| Panelefsiniakos | bye | |
| Kalamata | bye | |
| Apollon Paralimnio | bye | |
| Almopos Aridea | bye | |

==== Matches ====
8 October 2022
16:00 EEST

| Thesprotos | 1–2 | Veria |
|---|---|---|
| Bonilla 90+4' | | Fasidis 37'; Bouoli 52' (pen.) |

Municipal Stadium of Igoumenitsa, Igoumenitsa
Referee: Konstantinos Boubas (Epirus)

9 October 2022
16:00 EEST

| OF Ierapetra | 0–0 (a.e.t.) | A.E. Kifisia |
Penalties
| Andereggen (penalty missed); Stamou (penalty scored); Kallitsounakis (penalty scored); Dettler (penalty missed) | 2–4 | (penalty scored) Kouiroukidis; (penalty scored) Mazoulouxis; (penalty scored) Pozatzidis; (penalty scored) Talal |

Petros Vouzounerakis Stadium, Ierapetra
Referee: Theodoros Poulopoulos (Piraeus)

9 October 2022
16:00 EEST

| Anagennisi Karditsa | 0–0 (a.e.t.) | Apollon Pontus |
Penalties
| Kozoronis (penalty scored); Xydas (penalty missed); Giakos (penalty scored); Dimopoulos (penalty scored); Lagos (penalty missed); Aliatidis (penalty scored); Prikas (penalty missed) | 4–5 | (penalty missed) Kalogeris; (penalty missed) Sampanidis; (penalty scored) Aboudou; (penalty scored) Abankwa; (penalty scored) Malumandsoko; (penalty scored) Lampiris; (penalty scored) Roe Addo |

Panthessaliko Stadium, Volos
Referee: Fotis Polychronis (Pieria)

9 October 2022
19:00 EEST

| Apollon Larissa | 2–2 (a.e.t.) | Athens Kallithea |
|---|---|---|
| Stamatis 26'; Siatravanis 56' (pen.) | | Mounier 12'; Kynigopoulos 37' |
Penalties
| Giannitsis (penalty missed); García (penalty scored); Siatravanis (penalty scored); Balogiannis (penalty scored); Stamatis (penalty scored); Contreras (penalty missed); Fourkiotis (penalty scored); Kalousis (penalty missed) | 5–6 | (penalty missed) Loukinas; (penalty scored) Malçi; (penalty scored) Kynigopoulos; (penalty scored) Demethryus; (penalty scored) Rossi; (penalty missed) Evangelou; (penalty scored) Chatzidimpas; (penalty scored) Koltsidas |

Philippoupoli Ground, Larissa
Referee: Stylianos Leonidas (Trikala)

9 October 2022
16:00 EEST

| A.O. Agios Nikolaos | 2–0 | Niki Volos |
|---|---|---|
| Minas 21', 58' |

Agios Nikolaos Municipal Stadium, Agios Nikolaos
Referee: Georgios Patemtzis (Heraklion)

12 October 2022
15:00 EEST

| lmyros Gaziou | 3–1 | Panthrakikos |
|---|---|---|
| Piergiacomi 10'; Bourselis 41'; Antoniou 90' | | Giannakitsidis 60' |

Gazi Municipal Stadium, Heraklion
Referee: Stavros Georgopoulos (Arcadia)

=== Fifth round ===
The draw took place on 11 October 2022. Former Greek international and current football manager, Sakis Tsiolis, made the draw using a manually operated lottery ball cage.

==== Summary ====
| Team 1 | Score | Team 2 |
|---|---|---|
| AEK Athens | 2–0 | PAS Giannina |
| Kalamata | 2–2 (4–3 p) | Panetolikos |
| Athens Kallithea | 1–0 | Veria |
| A.O. Agios Nikolaos | 2–0 | Almyros Gaziou |
| Panserraikos | 5–2 (a.e.t.) | Panachaiki |
| A.E. Kifisia | 1–0 | OFI |
| Asteras Tripolis | 1–3 (a.e.t.) | Atromitos |
| Almopos Aridea | 0–2 | Lamia |
| Ionikos Ionias | 0–4 | Apollon Paralimnio |
| Volos | 4–0 | Ionikos |
| AEL | 1–2 | Levadiakos |
| Panelefsiniakos | 1–3 | Apollon Pontus |

==== Matches ====
20 October 2022
19:00 EEST

| AEK Athens | 2–0 | PAS Giannina |
|---|---|---|
| Kosidis 6'; Mantalos 68' (pen.) |

Agia Sophia Stadium, Nea Filadelfeia
Referee: Aristotelis Diamantopoulos (Arcadia)

19 October 2022
15:00 EEST

| Kalamata | 2–2 (a.e.t.) | Panetolikos |
|---|---|---|
| Rovas 35', 39' | | Flores 30', 78' |
Penalties
| Arnarellis (penalty scored); Pasas (penalty scored); Rovas (penalty missed); Borges (penalty scored); Bakayoko (penalty scored) | 4–3 | (penalty scored) Shengelia; (penalty scored) Liavas; (penalty scored) João Pedro; (penalty missed) Morsay; (penalty missed) Kolovos |

Kalamata Municipal Stadium, Kalamata
Referee: Konstantinos Perrakis (Athens)

19 October 2022
15:00 EEST

| Athens Kallithea | 1–0 | Veria |
|---|---|---|
| Santana 44' |

Grigoris Lambrakis Stadium, Kallithea
Referee: Stavros Tsimenteridis (Kozani)

20 October 2022
16:00 EEST

| Agios Nikolaos | 2–0 | Almyros Gaziou |
|---|---|---|
| Barata 27' (pen.); Canaj 86' |

Agios Nikolaos Municipal Stadium, Agios Nikolaos
Referee: Fotis Ntaoulas (West Attica)

19 October 2022
15:00 EEST

| Panserraikos | 5–2 (a.e.t.) | Panachaiki |
|---|---|---|
| Said 41' (pen.); Pantekidis 90+9'; Mourgos 104'; Katsantonis 110'; Sofianos 115' | | Bourlakis 62'; Mytidis 65' |

Serres Municipal Stadium, Serres
Referee: Giorgos Takidis (Kilkis)

20 October 2022
15:00 EEST

| A.E. Kifisia | 1–0 | OFI |
|---|---|---|
| Kouiroukidis 64' |

Michalis Kritikopoulos Stadium, Kaisariani
Referee: Fotis Polychronis (Pieria)

19 October 2022
18:00 EEST

| Asteras Tripolis | 1–3 (a.e.t.) | Atromitos |
|---|---|---|
| Castaño 105' | | Klonaridis 94'; Kjartansson 112'; Muñiz 120' (pen.) |

Theodoros Kolokotronis Stadium, Tripoli
Referee: Aristomenis Koutsiaftis (Arta)

19 October 2022
15:00 EEST

| Almopos Aridea | 0–2 | Lamia |
|---|---|---|
| | | Provydakis 26'; Marmentini 60' |

Aridea Municipal Stadium, Aridaia
Referee: Alexandros Tsakalidis (Chalkidiki)

20 October 2022
16:00 EEST

| Ionikos Ionias | 0–4 | Apollon Paralimnio |
|---|---|---|
| | | Gekas 2', 14'; Elezi 57'; Karyofyllis 90+3' |

Diavata Municipal Stadium, Diavata
Referee: Konstantinos Poulikidis (Drama)

18 October 2022
19:00 EEST

| Volos | 4–0 | Ionikos |
|---|---|---|
| Koutsias 19', 42'; Metaxas 62'; Ožegović 79' |

Panthessaliko Stadium, Volos
Referee: Efstathios Gortsilas (Macedonia)

19 October 2022
15:00 EEST

| AEL | 1–2 | Levadiakos |
|---|---|---|
| Pedrozo 7' | | Nikas 25'; Škvarka 44' |

Alcazar Stadium, Larissa
Referee: Konstantinos Tsetsilas (Grevena)

20 October 2022
16:00 EEST

| Panelefsiniakos | 1–3 | Apollon Pontus |
|---|---|---|
| Miskou 33' | | Kalogeris 18'; Belevonis 55'; Aravidis 71' |

Elefsina Municipal Stadium, Eleusis
Referee: Vassilis Stamos (Elis)

== Knockout phase ==
Each tie in the knockout phase, apart from the quarter-finals and the semi-finals, was played by a single match. If the score was level at the end of normal time, extra time was played, followed by a penalty shoot-out if the score was still level. In the quarter-finals and the semi-finals were played over two legs, with each team playing one leg at home. The team that scored more goals on aggregate over the two legs advanced to the next round. If the aggregate score was level, the away goals rule was applied, i.e. the team that scored more goals away from home over the two legs advanced. If away goals were also equal, then extra time was played. The away goals rule was again applied after extra time, i.e. if there were goals scored during extra time and the aggregate score was still level, the visiting team advanced by virtue of more away goals scored. If no goals were scored during extra time, the winners were decided by a penalty shoot-out. In the round of 16, if the score was level at the end of normal time the two-legged rule was applied.
The mechanism of the draws for each round is as follows:

- In the draw for the Round of 16, the four Super League clubs finishing in places 1–4 in the previous season are seeded, while the clubs advancing from the Fifth Round are unseeded.
  The seeded teams are drawn against the unseeded teams, with the seeded teams hosting the second leg. The remaining 8 unseeded clubs will be drawn against one another with the team being drawn last hosting the second leg.
- In the draws for the quarter-finals onwards, there are no seedings and teams from the same group can be drawn against each other.

== Bracket ==
Round of 16
A.E. Kifisia | 0 | 0 | 0
AEK Athens | 2 | 3 | 5
Panserraikos | 3 | 1 | 4
Apollon Pontus | 0 | 0 | 0
Olympiacos | 4 | 2 | 6
Atromitos | 1 | 2 | 3
Levadiakos | 1 | 0 | 1
Aris | 2 | 1 | 3
Apollon Paralimnio (a.e.t.) | 2 | 2 | 4
Agios Nikolaos | 2 | 1 | 3
Lamia | 1 | 2 | 3
Athens Kallithea | 1 | 1 | 2
Kalamata | 0 | 0 | 0
PAOK | 2 | 2 | 4
Panathinaikos | 3 | 2 | 5
Volos | 0 | 0 | 0

Quarter-finals
AEK Athens | 3 | 3 | 6
Panserraikos | 0 | 1 | 1
Olympiacos | 1 | 1 | 2
Aris | 0 | 0 | 0
Apollon Paralimnio | 1 | 2 | 3
Lamia | 2 | 4 | 6
PAOK | 2 | 1 | 3
Panathinaikos | 0 | 1 | 1

Semi-finals
AEK Athens | 3 | 1 | 4
Olympiacos | 0 | 2 | 2
Lamia | 1 | 1 | 2
PAOK | 5 | 1 | 6

Final
AEK Athens | 2
PAOK | 0

== Round of 16 ==
The draw took place on 14 November 2022. Former Greek international and member of the UEFA Euro 2004 squad, Antonios Nikopolidis, made the draw using a manually operated lottery ball cage.

=== Summary ===
| Team 1 | Agg. | Team 2 | 1st leg | 2nd leg |
|---|---|---|---|---|
| Olympiacos | 6–3 | Atromitos | 4–1 | 2–2 |
| Panserraikos | 4–0 | Apollon Pontus | 3–0 | 1–0 |
| Panathinaikos | 5–0 | Volos | 3–0 | 2–0 |
| Lamia | 3–2 | Athens Kallithea | 1–1 | 2–1 |
| Levadiakos | 1–3 | Aris | 1–2 | 0–1 |
| A.E. Kifisia | 0–5 | AEK Athens | 0–2 | 0–3 |
| Kalamata | 0–4 | PAOK | 0–2 | 0–2 |
| Apollon Paralimnio | 4–3 | Agios Nikolaos | 2–2 | 2–1 (a.e.t.) |

=== Matches ===
15 December 2022
19:30 EET

| Olympiacos | 4–1 | Atromitos |
|---|---|---|
| Biel 7'; Marcelo 50', 65'; El-Arabi 63' | | Kjartansson 11' |

Karaiskakis Stadium, Piraeus
Referee: Vassilis Fotias (Pieria)
11 January 2023
21:00 EET

| Atromitos | 2–2 | Olympiacos |
|---|---|---|
| Tzovaras 8'; Kotsopoulos 51' | | Cissé 38'; Marcelo 45+1' |

Peristeri Stadium, Peristeri
Referee: Giorgos Tzovaras (Pthiotis)

Olympiacos won 6–3 on aggregate.

16 December 2022
14:00 EET

| Panserraikos | 3–0 | Apollon Pontus |
|---|---|---|
| Kanis 11'; Katsantonis 51'; Sofianos 79' |

Serres Municipal Stadium, Serres
Referee: Dimitris Karantonis (Imathia)
12 January 2023
14:00 EET

| Apollon Pontus | 0–1 | Panserraikos |
|---|---|---|
| | | Katsantonis 37' |

Polykastro Stadium, Polykastro
Referee: Michalis Matsoukas (Aetoloacarnania)

Panserraikos won 4–0 on aggregate.

15 December 2022
17:30 EET

| Panathinaikos | 3–0 | Volos |
|---|---|---|
| Šporar 45+6'; Čerin 54'; Verbič 59' |

Leoforos Alexandras Stadium, Ampelokipoi
Referee: Aristotelis Diamantopoulos (Arcadia)
11 January 2023
16:30 EET

| Volos | 0–2 | Panathinaikos |
|---|---|---|
| | | Čerin 40'; Šporar 80' |

Panthessaliko Stadium, Volos
Referee: Angelos Angelakis (Macedonia)

Panathinaikos won 5–0 on aggregate.

14 December 2022
18:00 EET

| Lamia | 1–1 | Athens Kallithea |
|---|---|---|
| Bejarano 88' | | Loukinas 80' |

Lamia Municipal Stadium, Lamia
Referee: Fotis Polychronis (Pieria)
10 January 2023
16:30 EET

| Athens Kallithea | 1–2 | Lamia |
|---|---|---|
| Nili 41' | | Manousos 34'; Martínez 38' |

Grigoris Lambrakis Stadium, Kallithea
Referee: Dimitris Karantonis (Imathia)

Lamia won 3–2 on aggregate.

16 December 2022
16:00 EET

| Levadiakos | 1–2 | Aris |
|---|---|---|
| Tsirigotis 40' | | Iturbe 52'; Palma 64' |

Levadia Municipal Stadium, Livadeia
Referee: Angelos Evangelou (Athens)
11 January 2023
16:00 EET

| Aris | 1–0 | Levadiakos |
|---|---|---|
| Mancini 35' (pen.) |

Kleanthis Vikelidis Stadium, Thessaloniki
Referee: Konstantinos Tsetsilas (Grevena)

Aris won 3–1 on aggregate.

15 December 2022
21:30 EET

| A.E. Kifisia | 0–2 | AEK Athens |
|---|---|---|
| | | García 34'; van Weert 45+3' (pen.) |

Rizoupoli Stadium, Rizoupoli
Referee: Konstantinos Tsetsilas (Grevena)
11 January 2023
19:00 EET

| AEK Athens | 3–0 | A.E. Kifisia |
|---|---|---|
| Moustakopoulos 27'; Radonja 48'; Macheras 82' |

Agia Sophia Stadium, Nea Filadelfeia
Referee: Angelos Evangelou (Athens)

AEK Athens won 5–0 on aggregate.

14 December 2022
15:00 EET

| Kalamata | 0–2 | PAOK |
|---|---|---|
| | | Oliveira 26' (pen.); Brandon 78' |

Kalamata Municipal Stadium, Kalamata
Referee: Stavros Tsimenteridis (Kozani)
10 January 2023
21:00 EET

| PAOK | 2–0 | Kalamata |
|---|---|---|
| Brandon 11', 13' |

Toumba Stadium, Thessaloniki
Referee: Alexandros Katsikogiannis (Epirus)

PAOK won 4–0 on aggregate.

14 December 2022
14:00 EET

| Apollon Paralimnio | 2–2 | Agios Nikolaos |
|---|---|---|
| Gekas 11', 62' (pen.) | | Minas 17'; Shehu 76' |

Paralimnio Ground, Paralimnio
Referee: Michalis Matsoukas (Aetoloacarnania)
11 January 2023
14:00 EET

| Agios Nikolaos | 1–2 (a.e.t.) | Apollon Paralimnio |
|---|---|---|
| Minas 30' | | Georgiadis 2', 109' |

Agios Nikolaos Municipal Stadium, Agios Nikolaos
Referee: Konstantinos Katoikos (Athens)

Apollon Paralimnio won 4–3 on aggregate.

== Quarter-finals ==
The draw took place on 14 November 2022, after the Round of 16 draw.

=== Summary ===
| Team 1 | Agg. | Team 2 | 1st leg | 2nd leg |
|---|---|---|---|---|
| PAOK | 3–1 | Panathinaikos | 2–0 | 1–1 |
| Olympiacos | 2–0 | Aris | 1–0 | 1–0 |
| Apollon Paralimnio | 3–6 | Lamia | 1–2 | 2–4 |
| AEK Athens | 6–1 | Panserraikos | 3–0 | 3–1 |

=== Matches ===
18 January 2023
20:30 EET

| PAOK | 2–0 | Panathinaikos |
|---|---|---|
| Brandon 52'; Taison 72' |

Toumba Stadium, Thessaloniki
Referee: Slavko Vinčić (Slovenia)
26 January 2023
19:30 EET

| Panathinaikos | 1–1 | PAOK |
|---|---|---|
| Čerin 18' | | Oliveira 78' (pen.) |

Leoforos Alexandras Stadium, Ampelokipoi
Referee: Petri Viljanen (Finland)

PAOK won 3–1 on aggregate.

18 January 2023
19:00 EET

| Olympiacos | 1–0 | Aris |
|---|---|---|
| Rodrigues 30' |

Karaiskakis Stadium, Piraeus
Referee: Tiago Martins (Portugal)
25 January 2023
19:30 EET

| Aris | 0–1 | Olympiacos |
|---|---|---|
| | | El-Arabi 88' |

Kleanthis Vikelidis Stadium, Thessaloniki
Referee: István Vad (Hungary)

Olympiacos won 2–0 on aggregate.

18 January 2023
14:00 EET

| Apollon Paralimnio | 1–2 | Lamia |
|---|---|---|
| Elezi 41' | | Tzandaris 28'; Tsiloulis 78' (pen.) |

Serres Municipal Stadium, Serres
Referee: Spyros Zampalas (Epirus)
26 January 2023
17:30 EET

| Lamia | 4–2 | Apollon Paralimnio |
|---|---|---|
| Ashkovski 20'; Pavlovets 25'; Tzelidis 39' (o.g.); Tsiloulis 90+3' | | Koutzavasilis 8'; Elezi 86' |

Lamia Municipal Stadium, Lamia
Referee: Alexandros Tsakalidis (Chalkidiki)

Lamia won 6–3 on aggregate.

18 January 2023
17:30 EET

| AEK Athens | 3–0 | Panserraikos |
|---|---|---|
| Mantalos 55'; García 67'; Pineda 89' |

Agia Sophia Stadium, Nea Filadelfeia
Referee: Fotis Polychronis (Pieria)
25 January 2023
17:30 EET

| Panserraikos | 1–3 | AEK Athens |
|---|---|---|
| Katsantonis 49' | | Mantalos 21', 51'; Macheras 80' |

Serres Municipal Stadium, Serres
Referee: Stavros Tsimenteridis (Kozani)

AEK Athens won 6–1 on aggregate.

== Semi-finals ==
The draw took place on 14 November 2022, after the quarter-final draw.

=== Summary ===
| Team 1 | Agg. | Team 2 | 1st leg | 2nd leg |
|---|---|---|---|---|
| AEK Athens | 4–2 | Olympiacos | 3–0 | 1–2 |
| Lamia | 2–6 | PAOK | 1–5 | 1–1 |

=== Matches ===
9 February 2023
20:30 EET

| AEK Athens | 3–0 | Olympiacos |
|---|---|---|
| García 3', 90+12' (pen.); Samassékou 27' (o.g.) |

Agia Sophia Stadium, Nea Filadelfeia
Referee: Nikola Dabanović (Montenegro)
12 April 2023
19:30 EEST

| Olympiacos | 2–1 | AEK Athens |
|---|---|---|
| Valbuena 27'; Hwang 57' | | Ba 52' (o.g.) |

Karaiskakis Stadium, Piraeus
Referee: Aliyar Aghayev (Azerbaijan)

AEK Athens won 4–2 on aggregate.

8 March 2023
19:00 EET

| Lamia | 1–5 | PAOK |
|---|---|---|
| Martínez 86' | | Narey 1'; Konstantelias 25'; Augusto 62'; Thomas 67'; Sastre 69' |

Lamia Municipal Stadium, Lamia
Referee: Christos Vergetis (Arcadia)
13 April 2023
17:00 EEST

| PAOK | 1–1 | Lamia |
|---|---|---|
| Schwab 25' (pen.) | | Manousos 51' |

Toumba Stadium, Thessaloniki
Referee: Spyros Zampalas (Epirus)

PAOK won 6–2 on aggregate.

== Final ==
24 May 2023
20:30 EEST

| AEK Athens | 2–0 | PAOK |
|---|---|---|
| Moukoudi 26'; Fernandes 90+2' | Report |

Panthessaliko Stadium, Volos
Attendance: Behind closed doors
Referee: Felix Brych (Germany)

== Top scorers ==
| Rank | Player | Club | Goals |
|---|---|---|---|
| 1 | (Spain) Brandon Thomas | PAOK | 5 |
| 2 | (Greece) Vangelis Lathyris | PAO Vardas | 4 |
| 2 | (Cyprus) Andreas Katsantonis | Panserraikos | 4 |
| 2 | (Greece) Periklis Minas | A.O. Agios Nikolaos | 4 |
| 2 | (Trinidad and Tobago) Levi García | AEK Athens | 4 |
| 2 | (Greece) Kosmas Gekas | Apollon Paralimnio | 4 |
| 2 | (Greece) Georgios Georgiadis | Apollon Paralimnio | 4 |
| 2 | (Greece) Petros Mantalos | AEK Athens | 4 |
| 9 | (Greece) Nikolaos Skondras | P.O. Fiki | 3 |
| 9 | (Brazil) Marcelo | Olympiacos | 3 |
| 9 | (Greece) Georgios Chantzis | Asteras Stavrou | 3 |
| 9 | (Greece) Christos Vaskos | Panthrakikos | 3 |
| 9 | (Greece) Thomas Vasiliou | Ilioupoli | 3 |
| 9 | (Slovenia) Adam Gnezda Čerin | Panathinaikos | 3 |
| 9 | (Greece) Ledis Elezi | Apollon Paralimnio | 3 |
