= 1993–94 Gamma Ethniki =

Gamma Ethniki
- Season: 1993–94
- Champions: Paniliakos (South); Panserraikos (North)
- Promoted: Paniliakos; Ialysos; Panserraikos; Anagennisi Kolindros
- Relegated: Panarkadikos; Irodotos; Keratsini; Rodos; Erani Filiatra; Patras; Nigrita; Makedonikos; Keravnos Kolchikou; Ethnikos Alexandroupoli; Asteras Ambelokipoi; Nestos Chrysoupoli

The 1993–94 Gamma Ethniki was the 11th season since the official establishment of the third tier of Greek football in 1983. Paniliakos and Panserraikos were crowned champions in Southern and Northern Group respectively, thus winning promotion to Beta Ethniki. Ialysos and Anagennisi Kolindros also won promotion as a runners-up of the groups.

Panarkadikos, Irodotos, Keratsini, Rodos, Erani Filiatra, Patras, Nigrita, Makedonikos, Keravnos Kolchikou, Ethnikos Alexandroupoli, Asteras Ambelokipoi and Nestos Chrysoupoli were relegated to Delta Ethniki.

== Southern Group ==
=== League table ===
Pos	Team	Pld	W	D	L	GF	GA	GD	Pts	Promotion or relegation
1	Paniliakos (C, P)	34	24	6	4	91	25	+66	78	Promotion to Beta Ethniki
2	Ialysos (P)	34	20	7	7	57	27	+30	67	Promotion to Beta Ethniki
3	Doxa Vyronas	34	19	7	8	55	26	+29	64	
4	Panelefsiniakos (Note: Panelefsiniakos had 1 point deducted.)	34	18	7	9	52	34	+18	60	
5	Ethnikos Asteras	34	16	8	10	41	38	+3	56	
6	Acharnaikos	34	15	10	9	55	49	+6	55	
7	Egaleo	34	16	7	11	44	39	+5	55	
8	Aiolikos	34	16	6	12	53	52	+1	54	
9	Pannafpliakos	34	15	9	10	46	34	+12	54	
10	Chania	34	14	10	10	38	27	+11	52	
11	Panetolikos	34	15	7	12	42	39	+3	52	
12	Chaidari	34	13	7	14	43	42	+1	46	
13	Panarkadikos (Note: Panarkadikos had 6 points deducted.) (R)	34	14	6	14	34	46	−12	42	Relegation to Delta Ethniki
14	Irodotos (Note: Irodotos, Keratsini and Patras 3 points deducted.) (R)	34	8	8	18	36	50	−14	29	Relegation to Delta Ethniki
15	Keratsini (R)	34	7	7	20	32	59	−27	25	Relegation to Delta Ethniki
16	Rodos (Note: ?3 or 6 points deducted?) (R)	37	7	7	23	34	62	−28	22	Relegation to Delta Ethniki
17	Erani Filiatra (R)	34	6	3	25	40	72	−32	21	Relegation to Delta Ethniki
18	Patras (R)	34	2	3	29	20	92	−72	6	Relegation to Delta Ethniki

(C) Champions; (P) Promoted; (R) Relegated

== Northern Group ==
=== League table ===
Pos	Team	Pld	W	D	L	GF	GA	GD	Pts	Promotion or relegation
1	Panserraikos (C, P)	34	21	5	8	63	35	+28	68	Promotion to Beta Ethniki
2	Anagennisi Kolindros (P)	34	18	12	4	41	17	+24	66	Promotion to Beta Ethniki
3	Niki Volos	34	19	7	8	46	26	+20	64	
4	Kastoria	34	16	10	8	60	35	+25	58	
5	Trikala	34	15	8	11	54	38	+16	53	
6	Apollon Larissa	34	15	6	13	55	45	+10	51	
7	Kilkisiakos	34	14	8	12	49	41	+8	50	
8	Apollon Krya Vrysi	34	15	5	14	51	54	−3	50	
9	Velissario	34	13	9	12	53	44	+9	48	
10	Eordaikos	34	14	6	14	52	52	0	48	
11	Iraklis Ptolemaida	34	13	8	13	53	45	+8	47	
12	Pandramaikos	34	11	12	11	36	39	−3	45	
13	Nigrita (R)	34	10	9	15	35	50	−15	39	Relegation to Delta Ethniki
14	Makedonikos (R)	34	10	9	15	33	59	−26	39	Relegation to Delta Ethniki
15	Keravnos Kolchikou (R)	34	11	5	18	46	56	−10	38	Relegation to Delta Ethniki
16	Ethnikos Alexandroupoli (R)	34	8	8	18	33	54	−21	32	Relegation to Delta Ethniki
17	Asteras Ambelokipoi (R)	34	7	7	20	20	55	−35	28	Relegation to Delta Ethniki
18	Nestos Chrysoupoli (R)	34	5	8	21	31	64	−33	23	Relegation to Delta Ethniki

(C) Champions; (P) Promoted; (R) Relegated
