= Tripotamos =

Tripotamos may refer to:

- Tripotamos (Cataonia), a town of ancient Cataonia, now in Turkey
- Tripotamos, Florina, a village in the municipal unit of Meliti, Florina regional unit, Greece
- Tripotamos, Imathia, a village in the municipal unit of Veria, Imathia regional unit, Greece
- Tripotamos, Kilkis, a village in the municipal unit of Kroussa, Kilkis regional unit, Greece

== See also ==
- Tripotamo (disambiguation)
