= Stelios Panagiotou =

Greek footballer

Personal information
- Full name: Stelios Panagiotou
- Date of birth: 26 October 2001 (age 25)
- Place of birth: Larissa, Greece
- Height: 1.91 m (6 ft 3 in)
- Position: Center-forward

Team information
- Current team: Apollon Larissa
- Number: 17

Youth career
- –2019: Olympos Gonnon
- 2019–2021: Apollon Larissa

Senior career*
Years	Team	Apps	(Gls)
2021–	Apollon Larissa	15	(0)
2021	→ Apollon Pontus (loan)	15	(3)
- * Club domestic league appearances and goals as of 27 April 2022

Stelios Panagiotou (Greek: Στέλιος Παναγιώτου; born 26 October 2001) is a Greek professional footballer who plays as a center-forward for Super League 2 club Apollon Larissa.
