= 1996–97 Gamma Ethniki =

Gamma Ethniki
- Season: 1996–97
- Champions: Ethnikos Asteras (South); Anagennisi Karditsa (North)
- Promoted: Ethnikos Asteras; Kallithea; Anagennisi Karditsa; ILTEX Lykoi
- Relegated: Ilisiakos; Atromitos; Irodotos; Patra; Enosis Rodos-Diagoras; Varvasiakos; Almopos Aridea; Lamia; Iraklis Ptolemaida; Anagennisi Giannitsa; Nigrita; Anagennisi Kolindros

The 1996–97 Gamma Ethniki was the 14th season since the official establishment of the third tier of Greek football in 1983. Ethnikos Asteras and Anagennisi Karditsa were crowned champions in Southern and Northern Group respectively, thus winning promotion to Beta Ethniki. Kallithea and ILTEX Lykoi also won promotion as a runners-up of the groups.

Ilisiakos, Atromitos, Irodotos, Patra, Enosis Rodos-Diagoras, Varvasiakos, Almopos Aridea, Lamia, Iraklis Ptolemaida, Anagennisi Giannitsa, Nigrita and Anagennisi Kolindros were relegated to Delta Ethniki.

== Southern Group ==
=== League table ===
Pos	Team	Pld	W	D	L	GF	GA	GD	Pts	Promotion or relegation
1	Ethnikos Asteras (C, P)	34	21	6	7	69	32	+37	69	Promotion to Beta Ethniki
2	Kallithea (P)	34	19	8	7	49	28	+21	65	Promotion to Beta Ethniki
3	Ialysos	34	17	12	5	63	30	+33	63	
4	Aiolikos	34	16	9	9	50	36	+14	57	
5	Panegialios	34	15	7	12	43	33	+10	52	
6	Nafpaktiakos Asteras	34	14	9	11	46	36	+10	51	
7	Agios Nikolaos	34	14	8	12	46	37	+9	50	
8	Marko	34	14	7	13	41	33	+8	49	
9	Kerkyra	34	12	13	9	45	40	+5	49	
10	Ergotelis	34	13	10	11	49	37	+12	49	
11	Egaleo	34	12	12	10	49	40	+9	48	
12	Korinthos	34	14	6	14	41	36	+5	48	
13	Ilisiakos (R)	34	14	6	14	52	53	−1	48	Relegation to Delta Ethniki
14	Atromitos (R)	34	12	7	15	34	43	−9	43	Relegation to Delta Ethniki
15	Irodotos (R)	34	11	8	15	42	55	−13	41	Relegation to Delta Ethniki
16	Patra (R)	34	6	10	18	32	67	−35	28	Relegation to Delta Ethniki
17	Enosis Rodos-Diagoras (R)	34	6	6	22	26	74	−48	24	Relegation to Delta Ethniki
18	Varvasiakos (Note: Varvasiakos had 6 points deducted.) (R)	34	2	4	28	20	87	−67	4	Relegation to Delta Ethniki

(C) Champions; (P) Promoted; (R) Relegated

=== Results ===
Home \ Away	AGN	AIO	ATR	EGA	ERD	ERG	ETA	IAL	ILS	IRO	KLT	KER	KOR	MAR	NAP	PNG	PAT	VAR
Agios Nikolaos		2–0	1–1	2–3	2–1	1–2	1–1	1–0	1–0	1–0	0–1	3–0	3–1	3–2	3–2	0–1	0–0	2–0
Aiolikos	1–0		3–0	1–0	2–0	1–0	2–0	1–1	4–1	4–1	1–2	1–1	2–1	2–1	2–0	1–0	3–1	6–0
Atromitos	4–1	0–1		1–1	2–0	1–1	1–2	1–2	1–0	2–0	0–0	2–1	2–0	1–0	1–4	1–0	3–0	2–0
Egaleo	1–1	1–1	0–1		4–0	2–2	2–0	4–1	3–0	1–0	1–1	3–1	1–1	0–1	4–3	2–2	1–1	1–0
Enosis Rodos-Diagoras	1–1	0–1	1–0	0–4		1–1	1–1	0–3	3–7	0–2	0–2	1–3	0–1	1–0	2–1	1–0	2–1	3–1
Ergotelis	0–0	2–1	2–0	3–0	4–1		2–0	1–1	1–0	3–0	1–1	1–2	2–1	0–0	1–1	3–2	2–1	5–0
Ethnikos Asteras	3–1	4–1	3–0	1–0	7–0	1–0		4–2	3–2	3–1	1–0	0–0	5–0	3–2	1–0	2–1	6–0	4–0
Ialysos	0–0	2–0	3–1	0–0	1–0	1–1	2–0		5–0	5–1	1–0	2–0	1–0	1–0	2–1	1–1	3–1	8–1
Ilisiakos	3–2	4–2	0–2	1–1	5–1	1–0	0–0	0–0		4–0	4–1	2–2	1–4	1–0	2–1	0–0	2–1	3–0
Irodotos	0–2	1–0	1–1	4–1	2–2	2–0	1–2	2–1	4–1		1–0	0–0	2–1	0–0	1–3	3–0	2–2	2–0
Kallithea	2–1	2–2	4–0	4–1	1–0	1–0	4–1	2–0	1–1	3–1		2–2	2–1	3–1	2–0	2–1	2–0	3–0
Kerkyra	2–0	0–0	2–1	2–0	0–0	1–1	1–0	0–0	4–2	1–1	0–1		3–1	2–1	2–2	3–0	1–0	4–1
Korinthos	1–0	3–1	4–0	0–2	2–0	3–0	0–1	1–1	0–1	1–0	1–1	1–0		2–0	0–0	1–1	2–0	2–0
Marko	0–0	1–1	1–0	2–1	2–0	2–1	2–3	0–0	2–3	4–2	1–0	3–1	1–0		0–2	1–0	3–0	2–0
Nafpaktiakos Asteras	2–1	3–0	4–0	1–1	0–0	0–2	2–1	0–3	2–0	2–1	1–0	2–0	0–0	0–0		0–0	1–1	2–1
Panegialios	0–1	1–1	3–1	1–0	4–1	1–0	0–1	2–2	1–0	4–1	2–0	3–2	1–0	2–1	1–0		0–1	3–0
Patra	2–7	1–1	1–1	0–3	3–1	3–2	2–2	2–2	1–0	1–1	0–1	1–1	1–3	0–3	0–2	0–3		1–0
Varvasiakos	0–2	0–0	0–2	1–1	4–2	4–2	0–5	1–4	0–1	1–2	1–1	0–0	1–2	0–3	1–2	0–2	2–3	

Legend: Blue = home team win; Yellow = draw; Red = away team win.

== Northern Group ==
=== League table ===
Pos	Team	Pld	W	D	L	GF	GA	GD	Pts	Promotion or relegation
1	Anagennisi Karditsa (C, P)	34	19	8	7	50	32	+18	65	Promotion to Beta Ethniki
2	ILTEX Lykoi (P)	34	17	12	5	53	25	+28	63	Promotion to Beta Ethniki
3	Apollon Larissa	34	16	10	8	52	31	+21	58	
4	Tyrnavos	34	14	14	6	44	29	+15	56	
5	Orestis Orestiada	34	15	9	10	34	22	+12	54	
6	Aetos Skydra	34	15	9	10	49	34	+15	54	
7	Agrotikos Asteras	34	15	8	11	39	25	+14	53	
8	Ampelokipi	34	14	7	13	34	39	−5	49	
9	Pierikos	34	14	6	14	41	42	−1	48	
10	Poseidon Michaniona	34	13	8	13	39	44	−5	47	
11	Anagennisi Arta	34	12	10	12	32	28	+4	46	
12	Olympiacos Volos	34	12	10	12	42	34	+8	46	
13	Almopos Aridea (R)	34	11	11	12	43	54	−11	44	Relegation to Delta Ethniki
14	Lamia (R)	34	10	12	12	35	36	−1	42	Relegation to Delta Ethniki
15	Iraklis Ptolemaida (R)	34	10	8	16	36	50	−14	38	Relegation to Delta Ethniki
16	Anagennisi Giannitsa (R)	34	10	7	17	35	46	−11	37	Relegation to Delta Ethniki
17	Nigrita (R)	34	5	7	22	21	54	−33	22	Relegation to Delta Ethniki
18	Anagennisi Kolindros (R)	34	3	6	25	22	76	−54	15	Relegation to Delta Ethniki

(C) Champions; (P) Promoted; (R) Relegated

=== Results ===
Home \ Away	AET	AGR	ALM	AMP	ART	AGN	KRD	AKL	APL	LYK	IPT	LAM	NIG	OLV	ORE	PIE	PNM	TYR
Aetos Skydra		3–0	5–1	2–0	2–1	0–2	3–0	0–0	3–2	2–1	2–0	3–0	1–0	0–0	0–0	2–0	3–1	1–1
Agrotikos Asteras	3–0		2–0	0–0	0–0	1–0	0–1	1–0	2–1	1–0	1–0	2–0	9–1	0–0	1–0	1–1	3–1	0–0
Almopos Aridea	0–0	2–1		3–2	1–1	4–1	3–0	1–1	1–1	2–2	1–0	2–1	3–2	0–3	0–1	0–4	4–0	0–1
Ampelokipi	2–0	0–1	2–0		1–0	2–0	0–2	1–0	1–3	0–0	1–1	1–0	1–0	2–1	1–0	2–1	1–2	3–1
Anagennisi Arta	1–1	1–0	0–0	2–0		2–0	2–0	5–1	1–2	0–0	2–0	0–0	1–0	2–0	3–1	2–0	1–0	0–0
Anagennisi Giannitsa	3–1	2–2	1–1	0–0	1–0		2–1	3–0	2–1	2–3	4–1	0–0	2–0	1–0	0–3	0–1	0–1	1–3
Anagennisi Karditsa	2–1	3–0	3–0	3–1	2–0	3–1		5–0	1–0	2–2	5–2	1–0	0–0	2–1	1–1	1–1	1–0	1–1
Anagennisi Kolindros	2–0	0–1	3–4	0–1	1–1	1–1	0–2		0–2	0–1	1–2	1–0	0–3	3–3	0–1	0–1	1–5	0–0
Apollon Larissa	2–0	1–0	1–1	1–1	2–0	3–1	0–0	6–0		1–0	1–1	1–1	1–0	1–2	0–0	4–1	1–1	4–0
ILTEX Lykoi	2–0	1–0	1–1	3–2	2–0	1–1	1–1	3–1	3–0		5–0	3–0	2–0	3–0	0–0	3–0	1–0	1–2
Iraklis Ptolemaida	1–5	1–1	3–2	1–1	2–0	3–1	1–2	4–2	0–0	1–1		0–1	0–1	3–1	0–0	3–1	2–1	2–0
Lamia	1–2	0–0	3–0	1–2	3–1	2–0	2–0	4–0	2–0	3–3	1–1		1–0	0–0	3–2	0–0	4–0	0–0
Nigrita	0–1	0–2	2–0	0–1	0–2	0–1	0–1	0–1	1–6	0–0	1–2	1–1		1–1	1–0	0–1	2–2	0–2
Olympiacos Volos	1–0	1–0	1–2	5–0	1–0	1–0	1–2	4–0	0–0	1–2	1–0	0–0	1–1		1–0	3–2	1–1	5–1
Orestis Orestiada	1–0	1–0	5–1	1–0	1–0	1–0	1–0	2–1	1–1	1–2	0–0	1–1	4–0	1–0		1–0	2–0	0–0
Pierikos	1–1	2–1	0–2	2–0	1–0	0–0	1–2	4–1	1–2	1–0	2–0	3–0	1–3	2–1	1–0		4–1	0–0
Poseidon Michaniona	1–1	1–0	1–1	2–1	1–1	2–1	0–0	3–1	1–1	0–1	1–0	2–0	1–1	1–0	3–1	2–0		1–0
Tyrnavos	2–2	1–3	0–0	1–1	0–0	2–1	4–0	2–0	4–0	0–0	1–0	4–0	2–0	1–1	1–0	4–1	3–1	

Legend: Blue = home team win; Yellow = draw; Red = away team win.
