= 1994–95 Beta Ethniki =

Beta Ethniki
- Season: 1994–95
- Dates: 18 September 1994 – 28 May 1995
- Champions: Paniliakos
- Promoted: Paniliakos; Panachaiki; Kalamata
- Relegated: Charavgiakos; Panserraikos; Pontioi Veria; Korinthos

Beta Ethniki 1994–95 complete season.

== League table ==
Location of teams in 1994–95 Beta Ethniki

Pos	Team	Pld	W	D	L	GF	GA	GD	Pts	Promotion or relegation
1	Paniliakos (C, P)	34	19	10	5	70	36	+34	67	Promotion to Alpha Ethniki
2	Panachaiki (P)	34	17	8	9	48	32	+16	59	Promotion to Alpha Ethniki
3	Kalamata (P)	34	16	11	7	47	24	+23	59	Promotion to Alpha Ethniki
4	Ialysos	34	15	12	7	45	31	+14	57	
5	Apollon Kalamarias	34	13	13	8	57	38	+19	52	
6	Proodeftiki	34	14	10	10	42	39	+3	52	
7	Panargiakos	34	14	10	10	52	39	+13	52	
8	PAS Giannina	34	13	9	12	34	45	−11	48	
9	Anagennisi Kolindros	34	14	5	15	47	47	0	47	
10	Anagennisi Karditsa	34	13	7	14	42	47	−5	46	
11	Veria	34	14	4	16	47	51	−4	46	
12	Rethymniakos	34	14	2	18	46	47	−1	44	
13	Naoussa	34	11	9	14	46	48	−2	42	
14	Pierikos	34	10	9	15	39	50	−11	39	
15	Charavgiakos (R)	34	10	6	18	34	48	−14	36	Relegation to Gamma Ethniki
16	Panserraikos (R)	34	8	11	15	40	56	−16	35	Relegation to Gamma Ethniki
17	Pontioi Veria (R)	34	10	4	20	31	57	−26	34	Relegation to Gamma Ethniki
18	Korinthos (R)	34	8	6	20	34	66	−32	30	Relegation to Gamma Ethniki

(C) Champions; (P) Promoted; (R) Relegated

== Results ==
Home \ Away	KRD	AKL	APL	CHV	IAL	KAL	KOR	NAO	PCK	PRG	PNL	PSE	PAS	PIE	PVR	PRO	RTY	VER
Anagennisi Karditsa		1–0	0–1	2–0	2–1	4–5	2–1	3–1	2–0	1–1	0–0	2–0	1–1	2–0	1–0	2–0	1–0	3–0
Anagennisi Kolindros	0–0		1–1	3–0	1–1	2–1	4–1	4–2	1–1	1–0	1–2	0–1	2–0	2–0	2–1	0–2	2–1	4–2
Apollon Kalamarias	1–1	3–1		3–2	3–0	1–1	1–1	4–0	2–2	2–1	2–4	6–1	1–1	5–2	2–0	0–0	5–2	2–0
Charavgiakos	1–1	1–0	2–1		1–2	2–1	3–0	2–0	0–2	2–0	2–3	2–0	1–2	1–1	0–0	1–1	1–0	4–1
Ialysos	1–0	2–1	1–0	1–0		1–0	1–0	0–0	1–1	1–0	2–2	2–2	3–0	0–0	3–1	0–0	6–1	2–1
Kalamata	2–0	2–0	1–1	1–1	3–0		2–0	0–1	0–0	2–0	3–2	2–0	1–1	4–0	2–0	1–1	4–0	3–0
Korinthos	2–0	1–0	0–2	1–1	1–1	0–1		3–2	2–1	2–3	0–1	1–2	1–0	2–1	4–0	2–2	2–1	1–2
Naoussa	5–0	0–1	3–1	3–1	1–4	1–1	3–1		1–4	2–1	1–1	2–2	3–0	1–1	0–1	3–0	2–0	2–2
Panachaiki	1–0	1–0	1–0	4–0	2–1	2–0	4–0	2–0		1–1	1–0	1–0	3–0	1–0	0–1	1–0	2–1	4–0
Panargiakos	4–2	3–1	1–1	2–0	0–0	0–0	3–0	1–1	4–1		1–1	1–0	6–2	3–1	5–0	1–1	1–1	2–0
Paniliakos	4–3	6–0	1–1	1–0	0–2	0–0	4–0	2–0	2–2	2–0		1–1	1–1	2–1	4–1	4–1	2–1	4–1
Panserraikos	0–0	3–3	1–1	3–1	0–0	2–1	2–2	1–0	2–2	0–1	2–3		2–3	1–1	3–1	1–1	2–1	3–2
PAS Giannina	1–0	0–2	2–1	1–0	2–0	0–0	2–1	0–0	2–1	4–1	0–2	1–0		1–0	3–0	1–1	1–0	0–0
Pierikos	4–1	3–2	0–0	1–0	1–1	0–1	2–2	0–1	2–0	0–1	3–2	2–1	1–0		4–0	2–1	3–2	1–1
Pontioi Veria	1–2	1–0	3–0	0–2	2–1	0–1	3–0	2–1	0–0	1–2	2–3	2–1	2–2	1–1		2–1	1–0	1–3
Proodeftiki	3–1	0–3	0–2	1–0	1–0	0–0	5–0	1–0	1–0	5–2	0–0	4–1	2–0	2–1	1–0		3–2	1–0
Rethymniakos	3–1	3–1	1–0	1–0	0–2	2–0	3–0	1–2	2–0	0–0	1–0	2–0	4–0	4–0	2–1	1–0		3–1
Veria	3–1	1–2	1–0	5–0	1–2	0–1	2–0	1–1	3–0	1–0	0–4	2–0	2–0	2–0	1–0	5–0	1–0	

Legend: Blue = home team win; Yellow = draw; Red = away team win.

== Top scorers ==
Rank	Player	Club	Goals
1	(Greece) Dimitris Kakanoulias	Panargiakos	17
1	(Federal Republic of Yugoslavia) Bogoljub Ranđelović	Pierikos	17
3	(Greece) Tasos Stranzalis	Paniliakos	14
3	(Federal Republic of Yugoslavia) Predrag Mitić	Rethymniakos	14
3	(Greece) Theodoros Armylagos	Paniliakos	14
6	(Greece) Thomas Troupkos	Veria	13
6	(Brazil) Ademar	Charavgiakos	13
8	(Greece) Dimitris Nolis	Apollon Kalamarias	12
8	(Federal Republic of Yugoslavia) Zdenko Muf	Kalamata	12
