= Evangelos Tsiolis =

Greek footballer

Personal information
- Full name: Evangelos Tsiolis
- Date of birth: 9 May 1981 (age 45)
- Place of birth: Karditsa, Greece
- Height: 1.82 m (6 ft 0 in)
- Position: Midfielder

Senior career*
Years	Team	Apps	(Gls)
1999–2002	Anagennisi Karditsa	13	(0)
2002–2004	Paniliakos	53	(0)
2004–2005	Panionios	14	(0)
2005–2006	Kallithea	23	(0)
2006–2007	Thrasyvoulos	26	(0)
2007–2008	Agios Dimitrios		
2008–2009	Thrasyvoulos	16	(0)
2009–2010	Ilioupoli	27	(0)
2010–2011	Ethnikos Asteras	21	(0)

International career
2003	Greece U21		
- * Club domestic league appearances and goals as of 1 July 2011

Evangelos Tsiolis (Greek: Ευάγγελος Τσιώλης; born 9 May 1981) is a Greek former professional football who played as a midfielder.

== Club career ==
Born in Karditsa, Tsiolis previously played in the Super League Greece with Paniliakos, Panionios F.C., Kallithea and Thrasyvoulos F.C.

== Personal ==
His father is Sakis Tsiolis
