= Boudouris =

Boudouris is a surname. Notable people with the surname include:

- Nikos Boudouris
- Sokratis Boudouris
- Anastasios Boudouris
