= Sampanidis =

Sampanidis (Greek: Σαμπανίδης) is a Greek surname. Notable people with the surname include:

- Christina Sampanidis (born 1988), Serbian footballer
- Nikos Sampanidis (born 1998), Greek footballer
