= Vangelis Nousios =

Greek footballer

Personal information
- Full name: Evangelos Nousios
- Date of birth: 6 July 1998 (age 28)
- Place of birth: Larissa, Greece
- Height: 1.80 m (5 ft 11 in)
- Position: Right winger

Youth career
- –2016: Tyrnavos
- 2016–2018: AEL

Senior career*
Years	Team	Apps	(Gls)
2018–2019	AEL	4	(0)
2019–	Apollon Larissa	37	(4)
- * Club domestic league appearances and goals as of 12 March 2023

Vangelis Nousios (Greek: Βαγγέλης Νούσιος; born 6 July 1998) is a Greek professional footballer who plays as a right winger.
