= Xenofon Moschogiannis =

Greek footballer

Personal information
- Full name: Xenofon Moschogiannis
- Date of birth: 21 January 1977 (age 49)
- Place of birth: Pyrgos, Ilia, Greece
- Height: 1.87 m (6 ft 2 in)
- Position: Defender

Senior career*
Years	Team	Apps	(Gls)
1994–2002	Paniliakos	95	(3)
2002–2005	OFI	38	(3)
2006–2007	Kerkyra	25	(0)
2007–2009	Asteras Tripolis	2	(0)
2008–2009	→ Ethnikos Piraeus (loan)	8	(1)
2009–2010	Ethnikos Piraeus	25	(2)
- * Club domestic league appearances and goals

Xenofon Moschogiannis (Greek: Ξενοφών Μοσχογιάννης; born 21 January 1977) is a retired Greek football defender.

== Career ==
Born in Pyrgos, Elis, Moschogiannis began playing professional football with Paniliakos Moschogiannis would play in the Greek Super League with OFI, Kerkyra and Asteras Tripolis. He finished his career with Ethnikos Piraeus, initially on loan from Asteras Tripolis of the Super League.
