= Tripotamo =

Tripotamo (Greek: Τριπόταμο) may refer to several villages in Greece:

- Tripotamo, Arcadia, a village in Arcadia
- Tripotamo, Evrytania, a village in Evrytania

== See also ==
- Tripotamos (disambiguation)
