= Alexandros Chalatsis =

Greek footballer (born 2000)

Personal information
- Date of birth: 16 June 2000 (age 26)
- Place of birth: Larissa, Greece
- Height: 1.89 m (6 ft 2 in)
- Position: Attacking midfielder

Team information
- Current team: PAS Korinthos

Youth career
- 2006–2018: Dotieas Agia
- 2018–2020: AEL

Senior career*
Years	Team	Apps	(Gls)
2018–2021	AEL	3	(0)
2020	→ Almyros (loan)	2	(0)
2021	AEP Kozani	5	(0)
2022	P.O. Elassona	6	(1)
2022–2023	Apollon Larissa	8	(0)
2023–	PAS Korinthos		
- * Club domestic league appearances and goals as of 12 March 2023

Alexandros Chalatsis (Greek: Αλέξανδρος Χαλάτσης; born 16 June 2000) is a Greek professional footballer who plays as an attacking midfielder for Gamma Ethniki club PAS Korinthos.
