= Ousseini Mounpain =

Cameroonian footballer (born 1994)

Personal information
- Full name: Ousseini Nji Mfifen Mounpain
- Date of birth: 20 January 1994 (age 32)
- Place of birth: Yaoundé, Cameroon
- Height: 1.86 m (6 ft 1 in)
- Positions: Defender; midfielder

Team information
- Current team: Skopje

Youth career
- Asociación Atlética Jorge Griffa
- Racing (Avellaneda)

Senior career*
Years	Team	Apps	(Gls)
2013	Defensores de Salto	2	(0)
2015–2016	Muñiz	22	(1)
2016	Atenas	4	(0)
2017	Huracán (Paso de la Arena)	4	(0)
2018	Skopje	18	(1)
2018–2019	Austria Klagenfurt	18	(0)
2020	Tarbes		
2020	Kozani		
2022–	Skopje		

International career
2018	Cameroon	1	(0)
- * Club domestic league appearances and goals

Ousseini Nji Mfifen Mounpain (born 20 January 1994) is a Cameroonian professional footballer who plays as a defender or midfielder for Skopje.

== Career ==
As a youth player, Mounpain joined the youth academy of Argentine fifth-tier side Asociación Atlética Jorge Griffa. After that, he joined the youth academy of Racing (Avellaneda) in the Argentine top flight. In 2013, he signed for Argentine fourth tier club Defensores de Salto. In 2015, Mounpain signed for Muñiz in the Argentine fifth tier. In 2016, he signed for Uruguayan second-tier club Atenas. Before the second half of 2017–18, he signed for Skopje in North Macedonia.

In 2018, Mounpain signed for Austrian second-tier team Austria Klagenfurt, where he made 18 league appearances. On 17 August 2018, he debuted for [Austria Klagenfurt during a 1–0 loss to Wacker II. In 2020, Mounpain signed for Tarbes in the French sixth tier. After that, he signed for Greek outfit Kozani. Before the second half of 2021–22, he returned to Skopje in North Macedonia.
