= Messemo Bakayoko =

French footballer (born 1994)

Personal information
- Full name: Messemo Junior Bakayoko
- Date of birth: 2 December 1994 (age 31)
- Place of birth: France
- Height: 1.93 m (6 ft 4 in)
- Position: Centre-back

Team information
- Current team: Kalamata
- Number: 19

Youth career
- FC Solitaires
- Issy-Les-Moulineaux

Senior career*
Years	Team	Apps	(Gls)
2015–2016	Stade Poitevin	0	(0)
2016–2017	Saint Nazaire	0	(0)
2017–2018	Stade Poitevin	18	(0)
2018–2019	Toulouse Rodeo	23	(2)
2019–2020	AS Beziers	6	(2)
2019–2020	AS Beziers II	13	(0)
2020–2023	Kalamata	50	(4)
2023	Persikabo 1973	2	(0)
2024–	Kalamata	24	(1)
2026	→ Anagennisi Karditsa (loan)	8	(0)
- * Club domestic league appearances and goals as of 20 September 2026

Messemo Junior Bakayoko (born 2 December 1994) is a French professional footballer who plays as a centre-back for Super League Greece club Kalamata.

== Career ==
Bakayoko played at FC Solitaires when he was younger, as well as then playing for Issy-Les-Moulineaux too. He was then introduced to men's football at Stade Poitevin, albeit at an amateur level. He joined Stade Poitevin in July 2015 and stayed there for a year, before moving to Saint-Nazaire in July 2016. Bakayoko spent a year at Saint-Nazaire, before then taking an unexpected return to the team from Poitiers and rejoining Stade Poitevin in July 2017. 13 months into his second spell at Stade Poitevin, Bakayoko joined up with Toulouse Rodeo, again still as an amateur, hoping he could begin to force a career for himself in football. This seemed to be Junior's breakthrough, as he experienced a good year in Toulouse and something exciting was just about to creep round the corner. On 16 July 2019, Bakayoko signed a professional contract with French fourth-tier side AS Béziers. He played a handful of games for Les Blaugranas, before soon moving on again. The majority of Bakayoko's games were for AS Béziers II as opposed to the first team however. On 23 October 2020, after just over 15 months at AS Béziers, Bakayoko moved to Greece to sign for Kalamata, again on a professional contract. Messemo Junior Bakayoko is still playing for the Greek side as of present.

=== AS Beziers ===
On 16 July 2019, Messemo Junior Bakayoko signed the first professional contract of his career with French fourth-tier club AS Béziers. He made his debut for the club on 2 August 2019, in a Championnat National fixture versus SC Toulon, playing the full 90 minutes in a 0–0 draw. He made two other Championnat National appearances (substitute) in August for Béziers, however this wasn't the greatest part of his first month in professional football. AS Béziers completed a historic victory on penalties over Ligue 2 (French second-tier) side AJ Auxerre, away from home, securing them a ticket to the second round of the Coupe De La Ligue. Bakayoko played 86 minutes in this extraordinary victory for AS Béziers.

Bakayoko played a total of six games in all competitions for AS Béziers, however despite it being his first season in professional football, was in a squad that went up against sides such as AJ Auxerre, Red Star FC, SC Toulon and Stade Lavallois. Junior left AS Béziers on 23 October 2020, for a new start in his professional football career.

Junior ended his AS Béziers career by playing the majority of his games in the reserves (AS Béziers II). Bakayoko starred 13 times for Béziers B team, scoring twice in this period.

=== Kalamata ===
On 23 October 2020, Bakayoko signed for Kalamata. He was given a contract extension soon after signing in June 2021, which has extended his contract at the Greek side until June 2023. Bakayoko made his Kalamata debut on 28 March 2021 in a Greek third-tier game versus AS Santorinis. He went unbeaten in his first six Kalamata fixtures, winning three and drawing three, before ending this unbeaten run in a 2–1 away loss to Athens Kallithea. Bakayoko scored his first Kalamata goal in only his second game for the club, netting in a 2–0 away win versus Aspropyrgos. Junior Bakayoko helped Kalamata gain promotion from the Greek third-tier, to the Greece Super League 2 by featuring in 16 games in his first season.

Junior Bakayoko made his Kypello Elladas debut - a Greek cup competition, in the third round versus OF Ierapetras away from home on 26 September 2021. He played the full 120 minutes, where Kalamata won 4–3 on penalties, however he did not feature in the fourth round of the cup competition.

Bakayoko made his Super League Greece 2 debut on 7 November 2021, in a 1–0 away defeat to AEK Athens B. Junior scored his first Super League 2 goal, netting the only goal in a 1–0 away victory against AE Karaiskakis. He has since played a total of 10 games this season in the Super League 2, becoming a key figure in the Kalamata back line. Bakayoko has so far featured against clubs such as AEK Athens B, Panathinaikos B and Levadiakos so far this season.

Junior Bakayoko has been subject to speculation relating him to a transfer to Greek top division clubs. It's reported that there's been interest in Bakayoko's signature from top-tier clubs Apollon Smyrnis, Ionikos and fellow Super League 2 club Xanthi.
