= Apostolos Kotsianoulis =

Greek footballer

Personal information
- Date of birth: 29 January 2001 (age 25)
- Place of birth: Greece
- Height: 1.82 m (6 ft 0 in)
- Position: Forward

Team information
- Current team: Erani Filiatra

Youth career
- –2018: Olympiacos
- 2018–2020: AEL

Senior career*
Years	Team	Apps	(Gls)
2020–2022	AEL	2	(0)
2022–2023	Apollon Larissa	11	(0)
2023–2024	Korinthos		
2024–	Erani Filiatra		
- * Club domestic league appearances and goals as of 15:45, 12 March 2023 (UTC)

Apostolos Kotsianoulis (Greek: Απόστολος Κοτσιανούλης; born 29 January 2001) is a Greek professional footballer who plays as a forward for Erani Filiatra. Previously he was playing for Super League 2 club Apollon Larissa.
