= Georgios Zacharakis =

Greek footballer (born 2001)

Personal information
- Full name: Georgios Zacharakis
- Date of birth: 2 January 2001 (age 25)
- Place of birth: Larissa, Greece
- Height: 1.82 m (6 ft 0 in)
- Position: Forward

Team information
- Current team: Apollon Larissa
- Number: 21

Youth career
- –2017: Toxotis Larissa
- 2017–2018: Olympiacos
- 2018–2020: AEL

Senior career*
Years	Team	Apps	(Gls)
2020–2022	AEL	5	(0)
2022–	Apollon Larissa	12	(3)
- * Club domestic league appearances and goals as of 15:45, 12 March 2023 (UTC)

Georgios Zacharakis (Greek: Γεώργιος Ζαχαράκης; born 2 January 2001) is a Greek professional footballer who last played as a forward for Super League 2 club Apollon Larissa.
