= Panagiotis Kynigopoulos =

Greek association football player (born 1996)

Personal information
- Full name: Panagiotis Kynigopoulos
- Date of birth: 24 September 1996 (age 30)
- Place of birth: Giannitsa, Greece
- Height: 1.86 m (6 ft 1 in)
- Position: Winger

Team information
- Current team: Olympiakos Nicosia
- Number: 26

Youth career
- –2013: Aiginiakos
- 2015–2016: Sint-Truiden

Senior career*
Years	Team	Apps	(Gls)
2013–2015	Aiginiakos	25	(4)
2015–2017	Sint-Truiden	1	(0)
2016–2017	→ Iraklis (loan)	6	(0)
2017–2020	Panachaiki	61	(6)
2020–2021	Enosis Neon Paralimni	2	(0)
2021–2024	Athens Kallithea	78	(24)
2024–2026	Iraklis	44	(5)
2026–	Olympiakos Nicosia	6	(5)

International career^{‡}
2015	Greece U19	6	(0)
- * Club domestic league appearances and goals as of October 20, 2026 ‡ National team caps and goals as of July 12, 2015

Panagiotis Kynigopoulos (Greek: Παναγιώτης Κυνηγόπουλος; born 24 September 1996) is a Greek professional footballer who plays as a winger for Cypriot First Division club Olympiakos Nicosia.

== Career ==
=== Early career ===
Born in Giannitsa, Kynigopoulos began his career with Aiginiakos and from there would move abroad for a season to Belgian top flight club Sint-Truiden, while earning six caps with the Greece Under-19 national team during this period.

He would return to Greece with Iraklis in Super League 1, and then spend three seasons at Panachaiki in the second tier.

=== Athens Kallithea ===
Kynigopoulos joined Athens Kallithea in September 2021. Playing both as a striker and a winger with his impressive combination of speed and strength, Kynigopoulos scored nine goals and added two assists in 26 appearances in the 2021–22 season.

In January 2023, Kynigopoulos signed a contract extension with Athens Kallithea through the 2025–26 season.

In the 2022–23 season, Kynigopoulos earned the honor of Most Valuable Player of the Super League 2 South Group as voted by the league's players and coaches, leading Athens Kallithea with 1,961 minutes played and notching eight goals and eight assists.
