= Sakis Tsiolis =

Greek footballer

Personal information
- Full name: Athanasios Tsiolis
- Date of birth: 30 June 1959 (age 67)
- Place of birth: Karditsa, Greece
- Height: 1.79 m (5 ft 10 in)
- Position: Midfielder

Team information
- Current team: Apollon Smyrnis (manager)

Senior career*
Years	Team	Apps	(Gls)
1977–1982	Anagennisi Karditsa	52	(11)
1982–1989	AEL	142	(9)
1989–1993	Ionikos	51	(9)
1993–1996	Paniliakos	37	(4)
1996–1997	Asteras Amaliada	11	(0)
Total		293	(33)

International career
1988	Greece	4	(1)

Managerial career
- 1996–1997: Anagennisi Karditsa
- 1997–1998: Nafpaktiakos Asteras
- 1998–1999: Preveza
- 2000–2001: Anagennisi Karditsa
- 2000–2001: Panelefsiniakos
- 2000–2001: Nafpaktiakos Asteras
- 2001–2004: Paniliakos
- 2004–2005: Kalamata
- 2005–2006: Ionikos
- 2006–2007: Levadiakos
- 2007–2009: Thrasyvoulos
- 2009–2011: Olympiacos Volos
- 2011: Aris
- 2011–2013: Asteras Tripolis
- 2013–2014: PAS Giannina
- 2014: Skoda Xanthi
- 2015: Kerkyra
- 2016–2017: AEL
- 2017–2018: Kerkyra
- 2019: Panachaiki
- 2020: Volos
- 2022: Kalamata
- 2022–2023: Iraklis
- 2024–: Apollon Smyrnis
- * Club domestic league appearances and goals

Sakis Tsiolis (Greek: Σάκης Tσιώλης; born 30 June 1959) is a Greek professional football manager and former player.

== Playing career ==
As a professional footballer, he played for Anagennisi Karditsa, AEL, Ionikos and Paniliakos.

Tsiolis, a great player at his prime years, was a Greek Football Cup winner in 1985 and an Alpha Ethniki champion in 1988 with AEL. He also made four appearances for Greece national football team in 1988, scoring once.

== Managerial career ==
In the 1996–97 season, he was a member of the semi-professional team Asteras Amaliada, as a player-manager.

From 1996 to 2001 he worked as a semi-professional manager for Anagennisi Karditsa (twice), Nafpaktiakos Asteras (twice), Preveza and Panelefsiniakos. He is a professional manager since 2001, when he started his career at Paniliakos. In the following years he managed Kalamata, Ionikos, Levadiakos, Thrasyvoulos, Olympiacos Volos, Aris and AEL. On 2 June 2016 he left AEL Larissa because of a disagreement with club president Alexis Kougias over the plans for the next season, after the club was promoted to Super League Greece.

== Personal life ==
His son is Evangelos Tsiolis.

== Managerial statistics ==
As of 18 March 2017

Team	Nation	From	To	Record				
Team	Nation	From	To	Played	W	D	L	Win %
Various teams	Greece	4 December 2000	18 March 2017	367	149	90	128	40.60
