= Giannis Balogiannis =

Greek footballer (born 1997)

Personal information
- Full name: Giannis Balogiannis
- Date of birth: 27 January 1997 (age 29)
- Place of birth: Larissa, Greece
- Height: 1.81 m (5 ft 11 in)
- Position: Winger

Team information
- Current team: Ilioupoli
- Number: 23

Youth career
- Chimarros Marmarinis
- 2010–2014: Toxotis Larissa
- 2014–2015: AEL

Senior career*
| Years | Team | Apps | (Gls) |
| 2014–2015 | AEL | 0 | (0) |
| 2015–2016 | Dotieas Agia | 13 | (0) |
| 2015–2016 | AO Velissariou | 18 | (4) |
| 2016–2017 | Ethnikos Filippiada | 27 | (7) |
| 2017–2019 | Tilikratis | 32 | (4) |
| 2019–2020 | Oikonomos Tsaritsani | 34 | (8) |
| 2020–2023 | Apollon Larissa | 64 | (2) |
| 2023–2024 | Pierikos | 18 | (4) |
| 2024 | Aiolikos | 14 | (2) |
| 2024– | Ilioupoli | 5 | (0) |
- * Club domestic league appearances and goals

Giannis Balogiannis (Greek: Γιάννης Βαλογιάννης; born 27 January 1997) is a Greek professional footballer who plays as a winger for Ilioupoli in the Super League 2.
