= Nasser Aboudou =

French footballer (born 1998)

Personal information
- Date of birth: 26 February 1998 (age 28)
- Place of birth: Paris, France
- Height: 1.75 m (5 ft 9 in)
- Position: Right-back

Youth career
- Drancy

Senior career*
Years	Team	Apps	(Gls)
2017	Drancy	1	(0)
2017–2018	Sion II	36	(3)
2018–2021	Sion	3	(0)
2022–2024	Apollon Pontus	57	(2)
2025	Diagoras	8	(0)
2025	Chania	0	(0)
2026	Kampaniakos	8	(0)
- * Club domestic league appearances and goals as of 26 April 2026

Nasser Aboudou (born 26 February 1998) is a French professional footballer who plays as a right-back.

== Career ==
On 25 July 2018, Aboudou signed his first professional contract with FC Sion, for 3 seasons. He made his professional debut in a 4–2 win over FC St. Gallen on 29 July 2018.

== Personal life ==
Born in France, Aboudou is of Comorian descent.
