= Sokratis Boudouris =

Greek footballer (born 1977)

Personal information
- Full name: Sokratis Boudouris
- Date of birth: 23 November 1977 (age 48)
- Place of birth: Karditsa, Greece
- Height: 1.74 m (5 ft 8 1/2 in)
- Positions: Right winger; striker

Senior career*
Years	Team	Apps	(Gls)
1995–2001	Anagennisi Karditsa	104	(23)
2001	Patraikos	6	(0)
2002	Marko	14	(3)
2002–2004	Poseidon Neon Poron	63	(24)
2004–2007	Olympiacos Volos	84	(26)
2007–2010	Anagennisi Karditsa	98	(35)
2010	Panthrakikos	7	(0)
2011–2015	Anagennisi Karditsa	61	(14)
- * Club domestic league appearances and goals as of 3 August 2010

Sokratis Boudouris (Greek: Σωκράτης Μπουντούρης; born 23 November 1977) is a Greek former professional footballer.

== Career ==
Born in Karditsa, Greece, Boudouris started his professional career in Anagennisi Karditsa (Kanaria) and played for the club from 1995 until 2001. Boudouris played in Beta Ethniki and Gamma Ethniki for the club Poseidon Neoi Poroi from 2002 until 2004. Also he played for the club Olympiacos Volos from 2004 to 2007.

In summer 2007 numerous football clubs from the Super League Greece and Beta Ethniki were interested in signing him, although he finally accepted an offer from Anagennisi Karditsa to return to the club after six years. Boudouris had the best of his career seasons in 2007–08 when he led Anagennisi in promotion to Beta Ethniki after eight years, beating Ilioupoli F.C.2-0 in a knockout play-off game in Athens, when he scored twice. In 2007–08 season, Boudouris scored 17 goals in the league and was awarded with the golden-boot of Gamma Ethniki. He also helped Anagennisi Karditsa to avoid relegation in 2008–09 season, scoring 10 goals in Beta Ethniki and being the top scorer of the club. At the end of the season several teams such as Diagoras F.C. and AO Kerkyra were interested in signing Boudouris but he finally sealed a new contract with Anagennisi Karditsa proving his devotion to the club and rejecting higher offers. Boudouris was considered as the natural captain by the fans although in 2010 he denied to hold the captain branch handed in the new and experienced sign Angelos Digozis. His temperament, moral and performance was acknowledged by every fan of Anagennisi Karditsa.

In the summer of 2010, after the serious administration problems, he signed a contract with the Panthrakikos, who is competing in Beta Ethniki for the 2010–11 season.

== Career statistics ==
season	club	league	Championship		Nation cup		Europe cup		Total	
season	club	league	appear	goals	appear	goals	appear	goals	appear	goals
1995–2001	Anagennisi Karditsa		104	23	0	0	0	0	104	23
2001	Patraikos	Gamma Ethniki	6	0	0	0	0	0	6	0
2002	Markopoulo	Gamma Ethniki	14	3	0	0	0	0	14	3
2002-03	Poseidon Neoi Poroi	Gamma Ethniki	63	24	0	0	0	0	63	24
2003-04	Poseidon Neoi Poroi	Beta Ethniki	63	24	0	0	0	0	63	24
2004-05	Olympiacos Volos	Beta Ethniki	84	26	0	0	0	0	84	26
2005-06	Olympiacos Volos	Beta Ethniki	84	26	0	0	0	0	84	26
2006–07	Olympiacos Volos	Gamma Ethniki	84	26	0	0	0	0	84	26
2007–08	Anagennisi Karditsa	Gamma Ethniki	32?	17	0	0	0	0	32	17
2008–09	Anagennisi Karditsa	Beta Ethniki	34	10	0	0	0	0	34	10
2009–10	Anagennisi Karditsa	Beta Ethniki	32	8	1	0	0	0	33	8
2010–11	Panthrakikos	Beta Ethniki	0	0	0	0	0	0	0	0
career total			369	111	1	0	0	0	370	111

Date of last update: 3 August 2010
