= Sebastian Chruściel =

Polish footballer

Personal information
- Full name: Sebastian Chruściel
- Date of birth: 24 June 1997 (age 29)
- Place of birth: Cephalonia, Greece
- Height: 1.90 m (6 ft 3 in)
- Position: Defender

Team information
- Current team: Pallixouriakos

Youth career
- –2017: Atromitos

Senior career*
Years	Team	Apps	(Gls)
2017	Olimpia Grudziądz	1	(0)
2018–2019	Karaiskakis	19	(0)
2019–2020	Panionios	0	(0)
2020–2021	Episkopi	9	(0)
2021–2024	Iraklis	69	(4)
2024–2025	Doxa Katokopias	9	(0)
2025	Makedonikos	7	(0)
2025–	Pallixouriakos	0	(0)

International career
2014–2015	Poland U18	8	(0)
2015–2016	Poland U19	10	(0)
2016–2017	Poland U20	6	(0)
- * Club domestic league appearances and goals as of 18:48, 1 June 2025 (UTC)

Sebastian Chruściel (Greek: Σεμπάστιαν Χρούστσιελ; born 24 June 1997) is a professional footballer who plays as a defender for Pallixouriakos. Born in Greece, he has represented Poland at youth level.

== Early life ==
Chruściel was born on 24 June 1997 in Cephalonia.

== Career ==
In 2017, Chruściel signed for Polish second division side Olimpia Grudziądz after playing for the youth academy of Atromitos in the Greek top flight.

Before the second half of the 2017–18 season, he signed for Greek club Karaiskakis, where he made 19 league appearances and scored no goals.

In 2019, Chruściel signed for Panionios in the Greek top flight.

In 2020, he signed for Greek third division team Episkopi.

On 16 August 2021, Chruściel joined Super League Greece 2 club Iraklis.

On 18 August 2024, he moved to Cypriot Second Division club Doxa Katokopias.

On 10 January 2025, Chruściel returned to Greece and signed with second-tier side Makedonikos.

On 9 September 2025, Chruściel joined Pallixouriakos.
