= Michalis Kouiroukidis =

Greek footballer

Personal information
- Full name: Michail Kouiroukidis
- Date of birth: 18 January 1995 (age 31)
- Place of birth: Greece
- Height: 1.92 m (6 ft 4 in)
- Position: Forward

Team information
- Current team: A.E. Mykonos

Youth career
- Panionios

Senior career*
Years	Team	Apps	(Gls)
2012–2013	Glyfada		
2013–2014	Ergotelis	0	(0)
2014–2016	Asteras Vari		
2016–2017	Kallithea	2	(0)
2017–2018	Proodeftiki		
2018–2019	Ionikos	6	(1)
2019–2020	Kalamata	7	(1)
2020–2021	Ionikos	16	(2)
2021	Diagoras	9	(3)
2022–2023	A.E. Kifisia	44	(16)
2023–2024	Levadiakos	11	(1)
2024–2025	Makedonikos	22	(4)
2025–2026	Egaleo	14	(2)
2026	Ilioupoli	12	(3)
2026–	A.E. Mykonos		
- * Club domestic league appearances and goals as of 21 April 2026

Michalis Kouiroukidis (Greek: Μιχάλης Κουιρουκίδης; born 18 January 1995) is a Greek professional footballer who plays as a forward for Gamma Ethniki club A.E. Mykonos.
