= AEP Kozani F.C. =

AEP Kozani
- Founded: 2003; 22 years ago
- Dissolved: 2023
- Ground: Kozani Municipal Stadium
- Capacity: 4,000

AEP Kozani Football Club (Greek: Α.Ε.Π. Κοζάνης) was a Greek football club based in Karagiannia, Kozani, Greece.

== History ==
AEP Karagiannia was formally established in 2003 after the merging of villages in the Karagianni area and was hatched by the hitherto "Black Skete" group. The name comes from the original GNPs which mean Pontian Athletic Association and has the eagle emblem. From the first years of its establishment, it has participated in the First Class of EPS. Kozani always finishing in the highest places. Karagiannion GDP participated in two Kozani EPS Cup finals. In 2011–12, they lost the trophy to SA Perdiccas. They won the Cup in 2015–16 against Macedonian Foufa. In 2016–17, they won the championship in Kozani and was promoted for the first time in its history at the Gamma Ethniki.

== Honours ==
=== Domestic ===
  - Kozani FCA Champions: 2
    - 2016–17, 2018–19
  - Kozani FCA Cup Winners: 2
    - 2015–16, 2016–17
  - Kozani FCA Super Cup Winners: 1
    - 2016–17
  - Fourth Division Winners: 1
    - 2019–20

== Notable players ==
- (Japan) Takayuki Morimoto
- (Czech Republic) Jakub Šašinka
- (Cameroon) Ousseini Mounpain
- (Greece) Alexandros Chalatsis
