= Christos Kalousis =

Greek footballer

Personal information
- Full name: Christos Kalousis
- Date of birth: 14 January 1998 (age 28)
- Place of birth: Larissa, Greece
- Height: 1.85 m (6 ft 1 in)
- Position: Defender

Team information
- Current team: Apollon Larissa
- Number: 4

Youth career
- –2016: Dimitra Giannoulis
- 2016–2018: AEL

Senior career*
Years	Team	Apps	(Gls)
2018–2019	Sparta	17	(0)
2019–2020	AO Sellana	6	(0)
2020–	Apollon Larissa	38	(2)
- * Club domestic league appearances and goals as of 12 March 2023

Christos Kalousis (Greek: Χρήστος Καλούσης; born 14 January 1998) is a Greek professional footballer who plays as a defender for Super League 2 club Apollon Larissa.
