= Okan Souleiman =

Greek footballer

Personal information
- Full name: Okan Souleiman
- Date of birth: 4 March 2000 (age 26)
- Place of birth: Xanthi, Thrace, Greece
- Height: 1.73 m (5 ft 8 in)
- Position: Winger

Team information
- Current team: Nestos Chrysoupoli

Youth career
- –2018: Xanthi

Senior career*
| Years | Team | Apps | (Gls) |
| 2018–2021 | Xanthi | 4 | (0) |
| 2019–2020 | → Kavala (loan) | 7 | (0) |
| 2021 | → Egaleo (loan) | 12 | (0) |
| 2021 | Olympiacos Volos | 8 | (1) |
| 2022 | Kavala | 17 | (2) |
| 2022–2023 | Tilikratis | 9 | (2) |
| 2023– | Nestos Chrysoupoli | 16 | (5) |

International career
| 2016 | Greece U16 | 4 | (1) |
| 2017 | Greece U17 | 2 | (0) |
| 2017–2018 | Greece U19 | 2 | (0) |
- * Club domestic league appearances and goals as of 17:53, 19 July 2023 (UTC)

Okan Souleiman (Greek: Οκάν Σουλεϊμάν; born 4 March 2000) is a Greek professional footballer who plays as a winger for Gamma Ethniki club Nestos Chrysoupoli.
