= Thomas Vasiliou =

Greek footballer

Personal information
- Date of birth: 28 July 1994 (age 32)
- Place of birth: Athens, Greece
- Height: 1.72 m (5 ft 8 in)
- Position: Winger

Team information
- Current team: AEZ Zakakiou
- Number: 9

Youth career
- Atromitos

Senior career*
Years	Team	Apps	(Gls)
2013–2018	Atromitos	21	(1)
2013–2014	→ Ionikos (loan)		
2014–2015	→ Ilisiakos (loan)		
2015–2016	→ Triglia Rafinas (loan)		
2018	→ Olympia Radotín (loan)	10	(2)
2018–2019	Rieti	15	(1)
2019	Volos	2	(0)
2019–2020	Aspropyrgos	13	(1)
2020	Chania	5	(0)
2020–2021	Aspropyrgos	12	(1)
2021–2022	Niki Volos	23	(4)
2022–2023	Ilioupoli	20	(3)
2023–2024	Peyia 2014	16	(2)
2024	Omonia Aradippou	9	(0)
2024–	AEZ Zakakiou	21	(2)
- * Club domestic league appearances and goals as of 26 June 2025

Thomas Vasiliou (Greek: Θωμάς Βασιλείου; born 28 July 1994) is a Greek professional footballer who plays as a winger for Cypriot First Division club AEZ Zakakiou.

== Honours ==
Volos

- Football League: 2018–19
