= Anagennisi Karditsa F.C. =

Men's association football team in Greece

Anagennisi Karditsa
- Full name: A.S. Anagennisi Karditsa 1904
- Nickname: Kanaria (Canaries)
- Short name: ASA
- Founded: 16 October 1904; 122 years ago
- Ground: Municipal Stadium of Karditsa
- Capacity: 3,500
- Chairman: Dimitrios Papadimitriou
- Manager: Apostolos Charalampidis
- League: Super League Greece 2
- 2025–26: Super League Greece 2 (North Group), 3rd
- Website: anagenisifc.gr
Home colours	Away colours

Anagennisi Karditsa Football Club (Greek: Α.Σ. Αναγέννηση Καρδίτσας) is a Greek professional football club based in Karditsa, Greece that competes in the Super League 2, the second tier of the Greek football league system.

== History ==
Anagennisi was formed on October 16, 1904, in the southwestern Thessalian city of Karditsa as the football team of the multisport club ASA (Greek: Αθλητικός Σύλλογος Αναγέννησης - Athlitikos Syllogos Anagennisis), the Athletic Association Anagennisi. The statute of the club was signed personally by Crown Prince Constantine I.

The first Olympic Games in Greece, in 1896, created the conditions for the creation of an athletic club in the city of Karditsa.

From its inception in 1904, the football team of Anagennisi was not officially recognized as a distinct entity within the organization. As more of the club's athletes began to show interest in the sport, the football team began to train and play locally organized games in the stadium of central Karditsa, which later became Pavsilipo Park. With the sport's expanding popularity in Greece in the following decades, in 1924 the football team was finally given its department within ASA. Playing in the independent, regional Thessalian League from 1929 to 1962, it joined the newly established Greek second division in time for the 1962–63 season. When the Greek football league became professional in 1979, the football department of ASA was reformed as FC [a Football Public Limited Company, or PAE (Greek: ΠΑΕ - Ποδοσφαιρική Ανώνυμη Εταιρία / Podosferiki Anonymi Eteria) and continued to compete as PAE Anagennisi Karditsas (FC Anagennisi Karditsa)].

One of the highlights in Anagennisi Karditsa's history is the victory over Olympiacos for the Greek Cup in 1993–94, as well as the win against Paniliakos for the Greek semi-professional cup final in 1981. In 2008, Anagennisi Karditsa reached the Gamma Ethniki play-off and beat Ilioupoli 2–0 in Athens to win promotion to Beta Ethniki, which was the second tier league until 2019.

Anagennisi Karditsa holds the record for the most fans to ever attend an away game for Gamma Ethniki in 2008, with 2,000 supporters in the play-off match against Ilioupoli. In the 2008–09 season, Anagennisi Karditsa had the fourth best average in attendance, despite having only avoided relegation in the last fixture against Veria.

In December 2021, for the first time in its history, the club reached the Greek Cup quarterfinals, commonly referred to as the "eight" of the Greek Cup.

On 16 October 2024, Anagennisi Karditsa FC celebrated the 120th anniversary of its foundation.

Anagennisi Karditsa participated in Super League 2 for the 2025–26 season.

== Name ==
The team took the name "Anagennisi" (renaissance) because the city of Karditsa was freed in 1881 from the Ottoman Empire. 24 years later, the team was created.

== Seasons in the 21st century ==
Season	Category	Position	Cup
2000–01	Gamma Ethniki (3rd division)	15th	GS
2001–02	Delta Ethniki (4th division)	11th	—
2002–03	Delta Ethniki (4th division)	2nd	—
2003–04	Delta Ethniki (4th division)	2nd	—
2004–05	Gamma Ethniki (3rd division)	12th	2R
2005–06	Gamma Ethniki (2nd division)	11th	2R
2006–07	Gamma Ethniki (2nd division)	6th	1R
2007–08	Gamma Ethniki (3rd division)	2nd	1R
2008–09	Beta Ethniki (2nd division)	15th	2R
2009–10	Beta Ethniki (2nd division)	12th	2R
2010–11	Football League (2nd division)	16th	2R
2011–12	Delta Ethniki (4th division)	1st	—
2012–13	Football League 2 (3rd Division)	2nd	3R
2013–14	Football League (2nd division)	5th	2R
2014–15	Super League (2nd division)	7th	1R
2015–16	Gamma Ethniki (2nd division)	8th	GS
2016–17	Gamma Ethniki (2nd division)	12th	GS
2017–18	Gamma Ethniki (2nd division)	13th	GS
2018–19	Gamma Ethniki (3rd division)	14th	—
2019–20	Karditsa FCA First Division	2nd	—
2020–21	Gamma Ethniki (4th Division)	1st	—
2021–22	Super League 2 (2nd Division)	5th	QF
2022–23	Super League 2 (2nd Division)	6th	4R
2023–24	Super League 2 (2nd Division)	10th	3R
2024–25	Gamma Ethniki (3rd Division)	1st (promoted)	—
2025–26	Super League 2 (2nd Division)	3rd	1R
2026–27	Super League 2 (2nd Division)	TBD	TBD

Key: 1R = First Round, 2R = Second Round, 3R = Third Round, 4R = Fourth Round, 5R = Fifth Round, GS = Group Stage, LP = League Phase, R16 = Round of 16, QF = Quarter-finals, SF = Semi-finals.

== Supporters and rivalries ==
Anagennisi Karditsa's main rivals are Trikala, from the neighbouring city of Trikala, and Ionikos. For many years, Anagennisi also maintained a bitter local rivalry with AOK. The fans have friendly relations with fans of Doxa Drama, Panetolikos, and Agroticos Asteras.

== Stadium ==
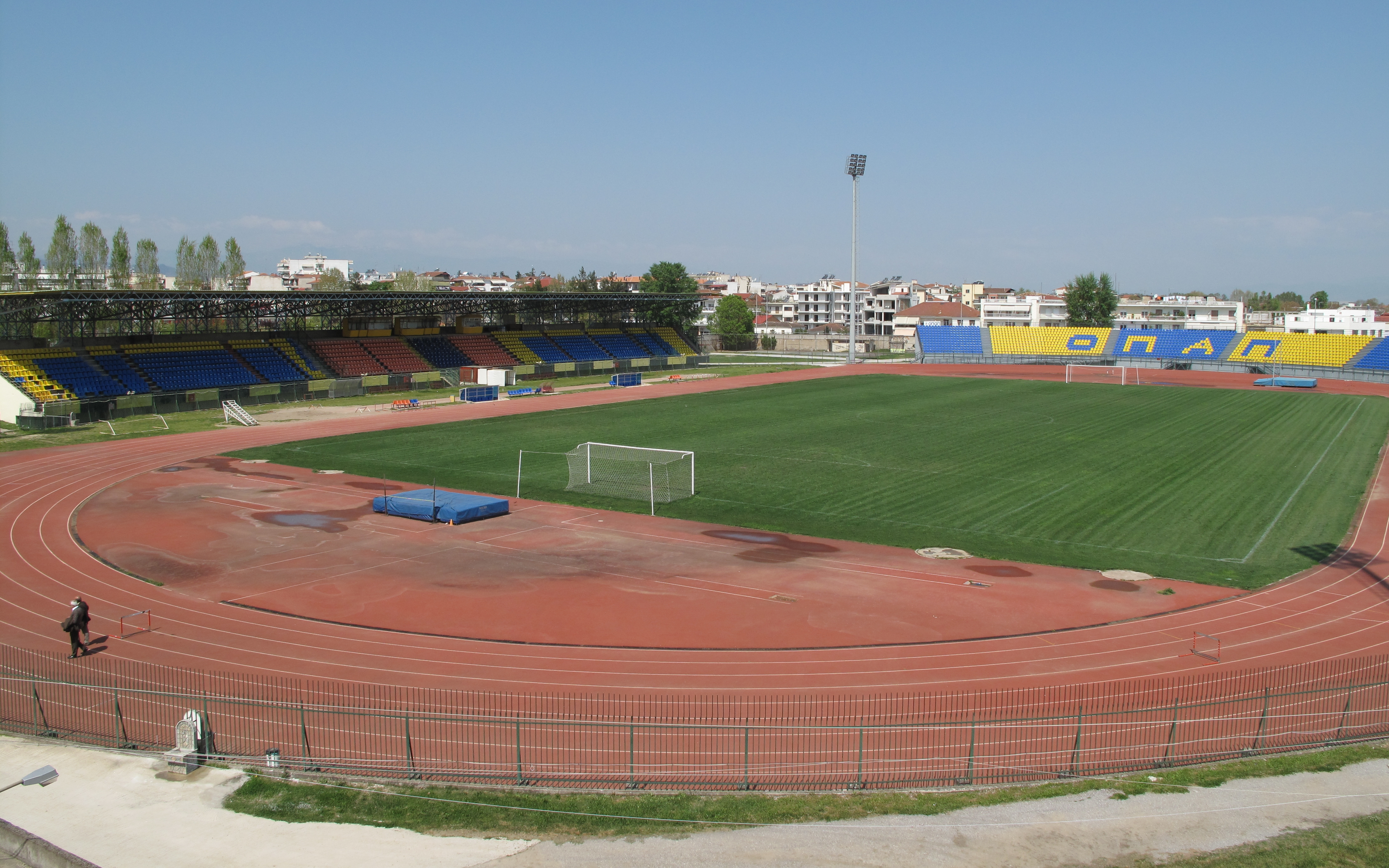
Municipal Stadium of Karditsa

Since 1949, Anagennisi Karditsa has played its home games at the Municipal Stadium of Karditsa "Antigoni Ntrismpioti", located in the eastern part of Karditsa. In January 2010, the stadium capacity was extended to 9,500 seats. Club training facilities, and the football academy, are located in the nearby southern borough of Stavros. The training center has taken the name 'Georgios Mpazis'.

== Honours ==
=== Leagues ===
- Third Division
  - Winners (3): 1992–93, 1996–97, 2024–25
    - Runners-up (3): 1980–81, 2007–08, 2012–13
- Fourth Division
  - Winners (3): 1991–92, 2011–12, 2020–21
    - Runners-up (2): 2002–03, 2003–04
- Greek Football Amateur Cup
  - Winner (1): 1980–81
- Thessaly FCA Championship
  - Winners (2): 1961–62, 1962–63

=== Cups ===
- Karditsa FCA Cup
  - Winners (4): 1980–81, 2001–02, 2003–04, 2011–12
- Karditsa FCA Super Cup
  - Winners (2): 2011–12, 2024–25

== Players ==
=== Current squad ===
As of 30 September 2026

Note: Flags indicate national team as defined under FIFA eligibility rules; some limited exceptions apply. Players may hold more than one non-FIFA nationality.

No.	Pos.	Nation	Player
2	DF	SYR	Abdul Rahman Weiss
3	DF	GRE	Ilias Simantirakis
4	DF	GRE	Christos Nonis
5	DF	GRE	Denis Thomaj
6	MF	IRQ	Lucas Shlimon
7	MF	GRE	Athanasios Papadakos
8	MF	GRE	Ilias Iliadis
9	FW	NGR	Cedric Omoigui
10	MF	GRE	Georgios Manousakis
11	MF	GRE	Anastasios Tselios
13	GK	ESP	Jaume Valens
14	DF	GRE	Nikos Golias
16	FW	GRE	Dimitrios Diamantakos
17	MF	GRE	Panagiotis Ninikas
18	FW	GRE	Christos Poulios
19	DF	GRE	Konstantinos Karypidis
20	MF	ARG	Brian Benítez
21	GK	GRE	Konstantinos Theodoropoulos
22	DF	GRE	Thanasis Papageorgiou

No.	Pos.	Nation	Player
23	MF	GRE	Tilemachos Karampas
27	MF	COL	Yair Castro
28	MF	ESP	Pinchi
30	FW	GRE	Ierotheos Dritsas
31	DF	GRE	Vasilios Vitlis
32	MF	ARG	Júnior Mendieta
37	GK	GRE	Vasilios Tsimopoulos
41	DF	GRE	Stefanos Evangelou
47	FW	JAM	Khayon Edwards
55	DF	GRE	Panagiotis Anastasopoulos
61	MF	ARG	Iván Molinas
65	MF	GRE	Christos Esketzis
72	MF	SEN	Ibrahima Mame N'Diaye
74	MF	GRE	Vasilios Biotis
77	DF	SRB	Nikola Vukajlović
79	MF	BRA	Mateus Santos
80	MF	CIV	Hamed Hader Fofana
88	FW	GRE	Michalis Tsoumanis

== Notable players ==
- (Greece) Pavlos Dermitzakis
- (Greece) Vaios Karagiannis
- (Greece) Sakis Tsiolis
- (Greece) Georgios Vakouftsis
- (Greece) Sokratis Boudouris
- (Greece) Makis Tzatzos
- (Greece) Kostas Fliskas
- (Greece) Vangelis Tsiolis
- (Greece) Stefanos Athanasiadis
- (Greece) Spyros Thodis
- (Cyprus) Georgios Tofas
- (Serbia) Milan Pavlović
- (Uruguay) Julio Mozzo (2010)
- (Brazil) Dos Santos Goncalves Wellington Daniel (2010)

=== Records and statistics ===
Information correct as of the match played on 19 September 2026. Bold denotes an active player for the club.
The tables refer to Anagennisi Karditsa's players in Second Division Greece, Greek Football Cup and Third Division Greece.

==== Top 10 Most Capped Players ====
Rank	Player	Years	App
1	(Greece) Sokratis Boudouris	1995–2001, 2007–2010, 2011–2015	263
2	(Greece) Giorgos Bitelis	2007–2011, 2012–2018, 2020–2021	202
3	(Greece) Dimitris Koutsopoulos	1998–2000, 2009–2010, 2015–2017	137
4	(Greece) **Nikos Golias**	2012–2013, 2015–2016, 2021–	129
5	(Greece) Dimosthenis Tzekos	2007–2011, 2014–2018, 2020–2021	128

==== Top 10 Goalscorers ====
Rank	Player	Years	Goals
1	(Greece) Sokratis Boudouris	1995–2001, 2007–2010, 2011–2015	72
2	(Greece) Dimos Tzekos	2008–2011, 2014–2021	19
3	(Greece) Sotiris Tsiloulis	2016–2017	13
4	(Greece) Angelos Chatzirizos	1999–2000, 2007–2015	12
5	(Greece) Sakis Tsiolis (Greece) Lampros Politis (Greece) Stefanos Athanasiadis	1977–1982; 2021–2022, 2023; 2021–2024	11

== Notable coaches ==
- (Greece) Andreas Stamatiadis (1973–74)
- (Greece) Georgios Paraschos (1994–95)
- (Greece) Georgios Vazakas (1997–98, 2017–2018)
- (Germany) Timo Zahnleiter (1998–99)
- (Greece) Vaios Karagiannis (2006–08, 2010–11, 2013)
- (Serbia) Dušan Mitošević (2008–09)
- (Greece) Periklis Amanatidis (2009–10, 2021–2023)
- (Australia) Joe Palatsides (2010)
- (Greece) Nikos Kechagias (2010)
- (Greece) Sakis Theodosiadis (2012–2016)
- (Greece) Giannis Mangos (2016–17)
- (Serbia) Zoran Babović (2018–19)
- (Greece) Michalis Ziogas (2020–21)
- (Greece) Timos Kavakas (2024–25)
- (Greece) Dimitris Spanos (2025–26)
