= Nikos Sampanidis =

Greek footballer (born 1998)

Personal information
- Full name: Nikolaos Sampanidis
- Date of birth: 2 November 1998 (age 27)
- Place of birth: Xanthi, Greece
- Height: 1.87 m (6 ft 2 in)
- Position: Striker

Team information
- Current team: Foinikas Polichni

Youth career
- –2017: Xanthi

Senior career*
Years	Team	Apps	(Gls)
2017–2018	Xanthi	0	(0)
2018–2021	Doxa Drama	42	(4)
2021	Egaleo	3	(0)
2022	Kavala	22	(3)
2022–2023	Apollon Pontus	6	(0)
2023	Doxa Drama	0	(0)
2023–2024	Aris Avato	0	(0)
2024	Kavala	0	(0)
2024–2025	Mykonos	0	(0)
2025	Ethnikos Neo Keramidi	12	(1)
2025–	Foinikas Polichni		

International career^{‡}
2015	Greece U17	2	(0)
2016	Greece U19	6	(0)
2018	Greece U20	2	(0)
- * Club domestic league appearances and goals as of 15 June 2025 ‡ National team caps and goals as of 11 January 2018

Nikos Sampanidis (Greek: Νίκος Σαμπανίδης; born 2 November 1998) is a Greek professional footballer who plays as a striker for Gamma Ethniki club Foinikas Polichni.
