= Apollon Larissa F.C. =

Apollon Larissa
- Full name: ΑΟ Απόλλων Λάρισας
- Nickname: Κυανόλευκοι (The Blue-whites)
- Founded: 1930; 96 years ago
- Ground: Philippoupoli Ground
- Capacity: 5,000
- Chairman: Zisis Delopoulos
- Manager: Michalis Ziogas
- League: Larissa FCA First Division
- 2025–26: Larissa FCA First Division, 2nd
- Website: https://apollonlarissafc.gr/
Home colours

Anniversary logo of the team in 2015 for the 85 years since the foundation.

Apollon Larissa Football Club (Greek: ΑΟ Απόλλων Λάρισας) is a Greek professional football club based in Filippoupoli, Larissa, Greece. It plays its home matches at the Philippoupoli Ground.

== History ==
Apollon Larissa is one of the oldest and most historic groups that were created in the city of Larissa. The club was founded in 1930 by students of the Averofius Farm School of Larissa in a rural settlement of the city of Philipoupoli and its first name was "Dimitra". The name "Apollon" the team took it in 1952. Its colours are blue and white. Twelve years later, in 1964, Apollon Larissa managed and played it for the first time in Greek second division, but did not win a league match at that level. The club also had a fine run in the 1997–98 Greek Cup, reaching the quarterfinals. There followed several years of "drought" in the local championship of Larissa and Delta Ethniki, but in the late 1980s and especially in the early and mid 1990s the team made an excellent run in Gamma Ethniki, giving very good football. In the Greek Cup, Apollon Larissa biggest distinction was the 1997–98 season when they reached the quarter-finals, where they were eliminated by Iraklis. Apollon Larissa has shown many remarkable players that some of them wore the shirt of National Hellas and played in foreign tournaments such as Nikos Patsiavouras, Kostas Kolomitrosisis, Vaios Athanasiou, Nikos Michopoulos, Pavlos Adamos, Stelios Hassiotis and Tasos Venetis. This is also contributed by the fact that the club owns athletic facilities in the city of Filippoupoli, where the team has a capacity of about 5,000 spectators. In May 2011, Apollon Larissa was relegated to the regionalized fifth level of Greek football, ending a period of 31 years in the national third and fourth divisions. In 2016, they were promoted to Gamma Ethniki for the second time in the history of the club since 1964. In the 2014–15 season, Apollon Larissa will fight for many years in the A1 category of Larissa (local category), which they departed until next season. The demobilization of the team resulted in the team being born again from its ashes and the administration was flanked by young people with a desire to work and with the aim of returning the team directly to the local class and at the same time organizing all the departments of the Academy today it has about 150 children.

== Honours ==
=== Domestic ===
==== Leagues ====
- Third Division
  - Winners (1): 2016–17
- Fourth Division
  - Winners (2): 1990–91, 2003–04
- Larissa FCA Championship
  - Winners (5): 1963–64, 1971–72, 1973–74, 1978–79, 2015–16
- Thessaly FCA Second Division
  - Winners (2): 1957–58, 1958–59
- Thessaly FCA Third Division
  - Winners (1): 1954–55

==== Cups ====
- Larissa FCA Cup
  - Winners (7): 1980–81, 1985–86, 1987–88, 1998–99, 2000–01, 2001–02, 2015–16

== Players ==
=== Current squad ===
As of 22 July 2023

Note: Flags indicate national team as defined under FIFA eligibility rules; some limited exceptions apply. Players may hold more than one non-FIFA nationality.

No.	Pos.	Nation	Player
2	DF	GRE	Vangelis Avlonitis
4	DF	GRE	Christos Kalousis
5	MF	GRE	Prodromos Potosoglou
6	DF	GRE	Charilaos Fourkiotis
8	MF	GRE	Alexandros Chalatsis
16	MF	GRE	Nikolaos Bekiaridis
17	MF	GRE	Dimitrios Ziakas
18	MF	GRE	Apostolos Kotsianoulis

No.	Pos.	Nation	Player
20	GK	GRE	Giannis Ikonomopoulos
21	FW	GRE	Georgios Zacharakis
23	FW	GRE	Giannis Balogiannis
27	MF	KOS	Buron Humolli
71	GK	GRE	Konstantinos Bakaros
77	MF	GRE	Vangelis Nousios
88	DF	GRE	Dimitrios Klingopoulos
99	DF	GRE	Pavlos Divanes

== Team statistics ==
=== Season to season ===
Seasons	Category	Position	
1930–1960	FCA Thessaly		—
1960–1964	FCA Larissa		—
1964–1965	Second Division	16th	
1965–1979	FCA Larissa		—
1979–1980	Third Division	13th	
1980–1981	FCA Larissa		
1981–1982	Third Division	6th	
1982–1983	Fourth Division	2nd	—
1983–1984	Fourth Division	9th	—
1984–1985	Fourth Division	2nd	—
1985–1986	Fourth Division	3rd	—
1986–1987	Fourth Division	3rd	—
1987–1988	Fourth Division	4th	—
1988–1989	Fourth Division	3rd	
1989–1990	Third Division	16th	
1990–1991	Fourth Division	1st	
1991–1992	Third Division	5th	—
1992–1993	Third Division	6th	—
1993–1994	Third Division	6th	—
1994–1995	Third Division	6th	—
1995–1996	Third Division	3rd	—
1996–1997	Third Division	3rd	—
1997–1998	Third Division	14th	
1998–1999	Fourth Division	6th	—

Seasons	Category	Position	
1999–2000	Fourth Division	9th	—
2000–2001	Fourth Division	4th	—
2001–2002	Fourth Division	7th	—
2002–2003	Fourth Division	3rd	—
2003–2004	Fourth Division	1st	
2004–2005	Third Division	16th	
2005–2006	Fourth Division	11th	—
2006–2007	Fourth Division	9th	—
2007–2008	Fourth Division	4th	—
2008–2009	Fourth Division	9th	—
2009–2010	Fourth Division	11th	—
2010–2011	Fourth Division	11th	
2011–2012	A' FCA Larissa	5th	—
2012–2013	A' FCA Larissa	5th	—
2013–2014	A' FCA Larissa	14th	
2014–2015	A1 FCA Larissa	1st	
2015–2016	A' FCA Larissa	1st	
2016–2017	Third Division	1st	
2017–2018	Second Division	10th	—
2018–2019	Second Division	3rd	—
2019–2020	Second Division	6th	—
2020–2021	Second Division	9th	—
2021–2022	Second Division	11th	—
2022–2023	Second Division	15th	
