= Paniliakos F.C. =

Disbanded association football club in Greece

Paniliakos
- Full name: Paniliakos Football Club
- Founded: 1 June 1957; 69 years ago
- Dissolved: 14 October 2024; 2 years ago
- Ground: Pyrgos Stadium
- Capacity: 6,750
Home colours	Away colours

Paniliakos Football Club (Greek: Πανηλειακός Α.Ο. Πύργου) was a Greek association football club based in Pyrgos, Elis, Greece. It played its home matches at the Pyrgos Stadium.

Paniliakos was the team of Serbia and Montenegro international Predrag Đorđević, before moving to Olympiacos, Greece international Stelios Giannakopoulos, and of Vasilios Lakis, also a Greece international.

== History ==
=== Early years ===
The football at Pyrgos began to spread, in particular, in the early 20th century. Initially, it was embraced by popular mass and gradually gaining more and more people. Pittsburghs with improvised balls in each neighborhood were, with time passing, into the new sport and they loved football. One of the first football matches in Pyrgos was the struggle of a group of Pyrgians against a group of English workers who lived in the port of Katakolo. The history of football in the form of clubs in Pyrgos begins during the interwar period. One of the first teams of the city (along with Ermis Pyrgos) was Iraklis Pyrgos, who had been unofficially founded in 1918 and gained an official statute in 1923. He had fought with claims in the championship of the FCA Patras, since Elis did not have her own football league, having even claimed the title in some cases (in 1931 she had quite a strong team finishing, finally, as 2nd). Heracles was based in the area of the old hospital, while the chairman of the team was the factory-owner Karavasilis. The colors of Hercules were blue and white. One of the most powerful Pyrgos teams, as well as one of the teams that later created Panileo, was the National Tower. The National was founded in 1927, but after a while, the club was inactive and re-established in 1938. He also fought at the National Technical University of Athens Patron. The Ethnikos team was particularly popular in the working class, as it was basically a group of the people, and many times he did not have a chairman, or his position was of no particular importance. Of course, the chairman of the team was also the founder of Paniliakos, Nikos Lampaounas. The National was fighting in the area where the National Stadium is currently located, and he also had, at times, a quite credible team. The colors of the team were green and white. The third team of Pyrgos, with the association of which Paniliakos was created with the two above, was AEK. Pyrgos, which was created in 1929 by G. Pavlidis. The AEK. it re-opened after the end of the war in 1944. Its colors, of course, were yellow and black and had its headquarters in the area of Chalikiatika. She also played in the championship of the FCA Patras. From AEK Pyrgos' great players, who later starred in Paniliakos, such as Theodoros Theocharopoulos and Michalis Kladidianos. In 1956–57, the three Pyrgos teams had a very bad year finishing last in the Regional Championship of the FCA Patras. Thus, the big decision was taken that would change the history of football in Pyrgos and Elis, in general, for the creation of a unified club in the city.

=== Formation ===
In 1957, Iraklis Pyrgos, Ethnikos Pyrgos and AEK Pyrgos they will unite and make Paniliakos (although the official year of the team is founded in 1958), choosing as the colors of the new club the red and the white. Paniliakos was the team that was to become the most powerful of Elis. The choice of the name wanted to show the representation of the general region of Elis by the club. The following year, Paniliakos and Apollon Pyrgos (players of Apollon) were to be included. From 1958 until 1965, Paniliakos would compete in the championship of the Hellenic Football Championship of Patras, just like the previous groups of Pyrgos (had lost the rise to the Second National since the Thyella Patras in 1963). In the year 1965–66, the 3rd National category will be established and Paniliakos will participate in it. In the 1970–71 season with AEK's old ace, Kostas Nestoridis, on the bench will win the 2nd National Division (preceded by the 1969–70 and the 1964–65 in Olympiacos Patras). 1971–72 will be the first time the team will take part in the 2nd National Championship. From there on, Paniliakos would move between the 2nd and 3rd National. The 1982–83 season will be the last year for Paniliakos in the 2nd National, as in 1983 he will be relegated after a bad year to 3rd National where he will stay until the 1986–87 season. From then on, there will be the "stone" years of the team, since 1987–88, the Paniliakos competitor with many problems (mainly administrative) will be demoted by the 4th National. Thus, the 1988–89 season will find Paniliakos in the history of the competitor in the 1st class of the National Technical University of Athens Elis. However, where everything seemed ominous for the future of the club, after the instigation of some of his close friends, the Elder businessman, Sakis Stavropoulos, will take over the leadership of the club and the team will find in his face the president who had not never. So, in the 1988–89 season, Paniliakos will make a walk and win the rally in Delta Ethniki, meeting only resistance from the fellow citizen. Tower '79 and gradually starting his journey towards the return. During the 1989–90 season, Paniliakos will compete in Delta Ethniki and will win the championship with Juan Ramón Rocha as a coach-coach, in a year when the Tower team scored a record number of tickets. In the season 1993–94, Paniliakos will finish first in the 3rd National Division breaking all records with 24 wins and only 4 defeats, and completed the league with 91 goals active against just 25 goals pass, thus, the ticket for the 2nd National. In the period 1994–95, Paniliakos will return (after 11 years absence) to the 2nd National. With his roster as a landmark player for Greek football, such as Predrag Đorđević, Zoran Slišković and Stelios Giannakopoulos, will finish first in the league and will become the first and only team to date in Elis that will have played in A National.

=== Recent years ===
The Pyrgos team immediately gained the appreciation of the audience, thanks to the beautiful and passionate football they played, while the people of Pyrgos and Elis, in general, stood by the team by flooding the National Stadium Pyrgos. The 1996–97 season was undoubtedly the best year for Paniliakos as they finished 7th with 13 wins, and in the first round, the team was placed in the top positions of the table. Paniliakos' presence in the Ethniki (Greek First Division) continued until 2000–01, when the team, after 6 years of continuous presence and amazing performances, achieving historic victories against all major Greek football teams, was sent back to the 2nd National after a notorious barrage match against Panachaiki where Paniliakos witnessed an inexplicable arbitration, which left no doubt as to which team was being devalued. In the 2nd National, Paniliakos would stay for 2 years as in 2003–04, Paniliakos returned to the 1st National. Unfortunately, this time, the team's presence in the "big lounges" would last only one year, as at the end of the season, Paniliakos found themselves in second-to-last place. Adding to the frustration for every Pyrgos fan and follower of the team was the last match against Panathinaikos, which finalised the team's relegation to the 2nd National. That match had banned Paniliakos fans and supporters from entering the stadium, a decision made by the team's administration.

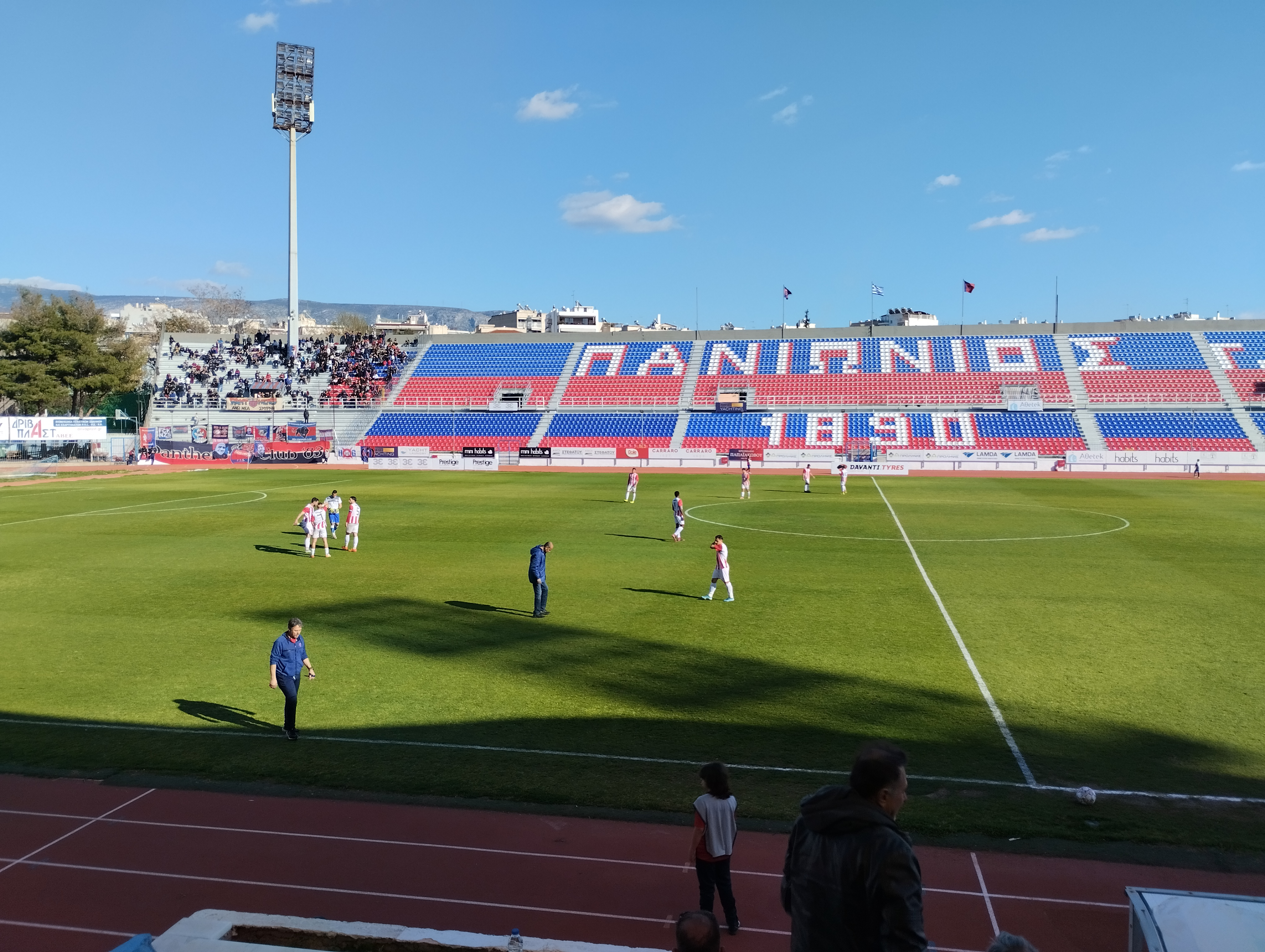
Paniliakos players during 2022/23 season.

After 2004, the team's progress was declining, facing huge economic problems and reaching the demo to the 4th National. In the 2009–10 season, Paniliakos will finish 1st in the 6th Group of the 4th National Team, thus climbing to the 3rd National and filling again with hopes for the future fans-fans, who continued to be next to it and support their favorite team. In 2012–13, Paniliakos will win the rally in the 2nd National Championship, after the restructuring of the championships. In the next few years, they will find the team of various executives who will try to exploit their involvement in their management team for their benefit and lead Paniliakos to the most black side of his story, as in the middle of the 2014 season / 15 will be forced to withdraw from the 2nd National Championship, while in the 2015–16 season the team will not be able to go down to the Third National Championship, remaining inactive and relegated to A1 FCA Elis.

However, that year, Paniliakos will find a new administration, consisting of a group of important businessmen in the city, aiming at the immediate return of the team to the National categories, as well as the joy and optimism of the team returning to the group's friends of Pyrgos.

In the summer of 2024, Paniliakos was dissolved and did not participate in any league.

=== Pyrgos A.F.C. ===
In the summer of 2025, a new club was created from a merger, Pyrgos A.F.C., with the colors and logo of Paniliakos, and plans to be renamed as Paniliakos in 2026.

== Season to season ==
Season Played	Greek League	Clubs competed	Position finished	Points	W - D - L
1993–94	Gamma Ethniki		1st (promoted)		
1994–95	Beta Ethniki		1st (promoted)		
1995–96	Alpha Ethniki		12th		
1996–97	Alpha Ethniki		7th		
1997–98	Alpha Ethniki		12th		
1998–99	Alpha Ethniki	18	13th	38	11 - 5 - 18
1999–00	Alpha Ethniki	18	13th	40	12 - 4 - 18
2000–01	Alpha Ethniki	16	14th (relegated)	29	7 - 8 - 15
2001–02	Beta Ethniki	14	10th	30	8 - 6- 12
2002–03	Beta Ethniki	16	2nd (promoted)	60	18 - 6 - 6
2003–04	Alpha Ethniki	16	15th (relegated)	21	4 - 9 - 17
2004–05	Beta Ethniki	16	8th	46	13 - 7 - 10
2005–06	Beta Ethniki	16	16th (relegated)	9	2 - 4 - 24
2006–07	Gamma Ethniki	18	15th (relegated)	33	9 - 6 - 19
2007–08	Delta Ethniki		5th		
2008–09	Delta Ethniki		3rd		
2009–10	Delta Ethniki		1st (promoted)		
2010–11	Football League 2	16	12th	37	9 - 10 - 11
2011–12	Football League 2	11	2nd		
2012–13	Football League 2	13	8th (promoted)	34	
2013–14	Football League	14	10th	35	
2014–15	Football League	13	13th (relegated)	Withdrew	
2015–16	Gamma Ethniki	14	Not Participated		
2016–17	Ilia FCA First Division	18	1st (promoted)	94	
2017–18	Gamma Ethniki	12	3rd	39	
2018–19	Gamma Ethniki	13	7th	32	
2019–20	Gamma Ethniki	14	14th (relegated)	18	
2020–21	Ilia FCA First Division	16	suspended due to the COVID-19 pandemic	18	
2021–22	Ilia FCA First Division	8	1st (promoted)	37	12 - 1 - 1
2022–23	Gamma Ethniki	14	11th (relegated)	18	7 - 5 - 14
2023–24	Ilia FCA First Division	11	6th	19	4 - 7 - 9

== Honours ==
=== Domestic ===
- Second Division: 1
  - 1994–95
- Third Division: 1
  - 1993–94
- Fourth Division: 2
  - 1989–90, 2009–10
- Elis FCA Champions: 6
  - 1969–70, 1970–71, 1975–76, 1988–89, 2016–17, 2021–22
- Elis FCA Cup Winners: 9
  - 1969–70, 1970–71, 1977–78, 1978–79, 1980–81, 1981–82, 1988–89, 2008–09, 2016–17

== Participation history ==
- Super League Greece (7): 1995–2001, 2003–2004
- Football League (12): 1972–1975, 1976–1977, 1982–1983, 1994–1995, 2001–2003, 2004–2006, 2013–2015
- Gamma Ethniki (27): 1965–1967, 1969–1972, 1975–1976, 1977–1982, 1983–1987, 1990–1994, 2006–2007, 2010–2013, 2017–2020, 2022–2023
- Delta Ethniki (6): 1987–1988, 1989–1990, 1975–1976, 1977–1982, 1983–1987, 2007–2010
- Ilia FCA First Division (5): 1988–1989, 2016–2017, 2020–2022, 2023–2024

== Notable players ==
For details on former players, see Category:Paniliakos F.C. players

- (Greece) Stelios Giannakopoulos
- (Serbia) (Greece) Predrag Đorđević
- (Montenegro) (Greece) Božidar Bandović
- (Greece) Vasilios Lakis
- (Greece) (Czech Republic) Loukas Vyntra
- (Bosnia and Herzegovina) Bernard Barnjak
- (Croatia) Zoran Slišković
- (Greece) Giannis Taralidis
- (Greece) Nikos Kyzeridis
- (Greece) Miltiadis Sapanis
- (Greece) Marinos Ouzounidis
- (Greece) Konstantinos Nebegleras
- (Greece) Takis Gonias
- (Greece) Giorgos Koltzos
- (Greece) Xenophontas Moschogiannis
- (Greece) Nikolaos Karabelas
- (Greece) Ilias Manikas
- (Greece) Athanasios Tsigas
- (Uruguay) Carlos Marcora
- (Peru) César Rosales
- (Poland) Leszek Pisz
- (Nigeria) Patrick Ogunsoto
- (Cameroon) Constantin Pigla

== Notable coaches ==
- (Greece) Kostas Nestoridis
- (Greece) Sakis Tsiolis
- (Greece) Georgios Paraschos
- (Greece) Makis Katsavakis
- (Netherlands) Arie Haan
- (Greece) Babis Tennes
- (Greece) Petros Ravousis
- (Greece) Vasilios Daniil
- (Greece) Ioannis Kyrastas
- (Argentina) Juan Ramón Rocha
- (Greece) Stelios Giannakopoulos
