= Tripotamos, Imathia =

Tripotamos Τριπόταμος
- Community
- Location within Greece
- Coordinates: 40°29′34″N 22°10′48″E
- Country: Greece
- Administrative region: Central Macedonia
- Regional unit: Imathia
- Municipality: Veria
- Municipal unit: Veria

Population (2021)
  - Community: 601
- Time zone: UTC+2 (EET)
  - Summer (DST): UTC+3 (EEST)

Tripotamos (Greek: Τριπόταμος) is a village and a community of the City of Veria, Imathia, Greece. It is situated at 400 m elevation, 4 km southwest of Veria city centre. The community consists of the villages Tripotamos (population 480 in 2021), Kato Komnineio (pop. 24) and Komnineio (pop. 97).

== History ==
The inhabitants are of Pontic Greek origin, coming the Caucasus region around 1920. They were refugees from the villages:

1. Sintiskom (present Yalnızçam), a village 17 km west of Ardahan. The villagers had moved there from the region around Argyroupoli (present Gümüşhane) in 1878 after the Russo-Turkish war. The people from Sintiskom arrived in Thessaloniki on January 1, 1921. They settled in several villages in the Kilkis regional unit and in Tripotamos and Komnineio.
2. Toroschof Kato, a village 22 km from Ardahan with 800 residents who came from Imera and Bayburt. After exchanging the Greeks settled in several villages in the Kilkis regional unit, in Tripotamos, and in Katerini.
3. Hasköy, a village 20 km southeast of Ardahan, on the road to Kars. It had 500 Greek residents, who settled after 1920 in the Kilkis regional unit, and in Tripotamos and Rachi in Imathia.

== Monuments ==
There is a marble monument in the middle of the village square, which is dedicated to all those who died in the war of 1940. There is a church of St. Peter and Paul. This church is the successor of the churches of the Apostles Peter and Paul in the village of Malachi near Argyroupoli in the period before 1878, and in Sintiskom during the period 1878–1920.
