= Anagennisi Kolindros F.C. =

M.G.S. Anagennisi Kolindrou
- Full name: Mousikochoreftikos Gymnastikos Syllogos Anagennisi Kolindrou
- Founded: 1948; 78 years ago
- Ground: Municipal Stadium of Kolindros
- Capacity: 5,000
- Chairman: Evangelos Tsianakoudas
- Manager: Emmanouil Glykos
- League: Pieria FCA Second Division
- 2025–26: Pieria FCA Second Division, 10th
- Website: https://anagennisi-kolindrou.blogspot.com/
Home colours	Away colours

M.G.S. Anagennisi Kolindrou (Greek: Μ.Γ.Σ. Αναγέννηση Κολινδρού) is a Greek football club, based on Kolindros, Pieria. It was founded in 1948.

The club spent two consecutive seasons in the Beta Ethniki, in 1995 and 1996. Currently it plays in the Second Division of the local Pieria championships.
