= 2021–22 Kalamata F.C. season =

Kalamata F.C.
2021–22 season
- Owner: George Prassas
- Chairman: George Prassas
- Manager: Nikos Anastopoulos
- Stadium: Municipal Stadium of Kalamata
Home colours	Away colours	Third colours

The 2021–22 season was Kalamata Football Club's 54th in existence and the club's first season in Super League Greece 2, the second level in Greek football, after the 2009–2010 season, when Kalamata was relegated to the amateur leagues.

== Transfers ==
=== Transfers in ===
Date	Position	No.	Name	From	Fee	Team	Ref.
22 June 2021	FW	—	(Greece) Savvas Mouzakis	(Greece) Kalamata F.C. U19	Promoted from youth team	First team	
15 July 2021	FW	—	(Portugal) Nani	(Greece) Episkopi F.C.	Free Transfer	First team	
23 July 2020	FW	—	(Greece) Aristidis Kokkoris	(Greece) Kavala F.C.	Free Transfer	First team	
23 July 2021	MF	—	(Greece) Adriano Skenderaj	(Greece) Ialysos F.C.	Free Transfer	First team	
27 July 2021	FW	—	(Greece) Giannis Loukinas	(Greece) Veria F.C.	Free Transfer	First team	
4 August 2021	GK	—	(Poland) Tomasz Kucz	(Spain) CF Palencia	Free Transfer	First team	
7 August 2021	MF	—	(Brazil) Matheus Alves	(Brazil) Flamengo	Free Transfer	First team	
7 August 2021	DF	—	(Belgium) Danny Lupano	(England) Hull City A.F.C.	Free Transfer	First team	
20 August 2021	FW	—	(Greece) Orestis Ademaj	(Greece) AO Diavolitsiou	Free Transfer	First team	
27 August 2021	DF	—	(Greece) Panagiotis Tsagalidis	(Greece) Aris Thessaloniki F.C.	Loan	First team	
27 August 2021	FW	—	(England) Maleace Asamoah	(England) Cheshunt	First Team	First team	
27 August 2021	MF	—	(Greece) Andreas Tatos	(Greece) Xanthi F.C.	Free Transfer	First team	
27 August 2021	DF	—	(Brazil) Marcos Moser	(Brazil) Portuguesa	Free Transfer	First team	
31 August 2021	MF	—	(Brazil) Sidney	(Brazil) Flamengo	Free Transfer	First team	
31 August 2021	MF	—	(Brazil) Nem	(Brazil) Sport Clube Itupiranga	Free Transfer	First team	
13 September 2021	DF	—	(Greece) Stavros Bounas	(Greece) Pamisos Messini	Free Transfer	First team	
13 January 2022	FW	—	(Brazil) Hugo Borges	(Brazil) Corithians	Free Transfer	First team	
17 January 2022	FW	—	(Greece) Frixos Grivas	(Greece) OFI	Loan	First team	

=== Transfers out ===
Date	Position	No.	Name	to	Fee	Team	Ref.
14 July 2021	MF	—	(Brazil) Wesley Da Silva	Released	Free Transfer	First team	
14 July 2021	MF	—	(France) Evan Salines	Released	Free Transfer	First team	
14 July 2021	MF	—	(Brazil) Chumbinho	Released	Free Transfer	First team	
29 July 2021	MF	—	(Greece) Vasilis Triantafyllakis	(Greece) O.F. Ierapetra F.C.	Free Transfer	First team	
6 August 2021	MF	—	(Greece) Michalis Zacharopoulos	(Greece) Panthouriakos	Free Transfer	First team	
14 August 2021	DF	—	(Greece) Konstantinos Panagiotou	(Greece) Egaleo F.C.	Free Transfer	First team	
14 August 2021	FW	—	(Greece) Florence Keri	(Greece) Santorini 2020 F.C.	Free Transfer	First team	
17 August 2021	DF	—	(Greece) Alexandros Galitsios	(Greece) Iraklis Larissas	Free Transfer	First team	
17 August 2021	MF	—	(Greece) Alexandros Natsiopoulos	(Greece) P.A.O. Rouf	Free Transfer	First team	
27 August 2021	FW	—	(Greece) Konstantinos Iliopoulos	(Greece) AO Diavolitsiou	Free Transfer	First team	
27 August 2021	FW	—	(Greece) Vangelis Alexopoulos	(Greece) Panachaiki F.C.	Free Transfer	First team	
27 August 2021	GK	—	(Greece) Giannis Arabatzis	(Greece) AO Neas Artakis	Free Transfer	First team	
17 September 2021	GK	—	(Greece) Ilias Evangelou	(Greece) Kallithea F.C.	Free Transfer	First team	
5 October 2021	FW	—	(Netherlands) Daoud Bousbiba	(Greece) Fostiras F.C.	Free Transfer	First team	
4 January 2022	GK	—	(Greece) Konstantinos Kapoutaglis	(Greece) Panionios F.C.	Free Transfer	First team	
7 January 2022	FW	—	(England) Maleace Asamoah	(Greece) Olympiacos Volos	Loan	First team	
21 January 2022	FW	—	(Portugal) Nani	(Greece) Olympiacos Volos	Loan	First team	
21 January 2022	FW	—	(Brazil) Nem	(Greece) Panargeiakos F.C.	Free Transfer	First team	

=== 2021-2022 squad ===
As of 7 January 2022

Note: Flags indicate national team as defined under FIFA eligibility rules; some limited exceptions apply. Players may hold more than one non-FIFA nationality.

No.	Pos.	Nation	Player
2	DF	BRA	Marcos Moser
4	DF	BEL	Danny Lupano
6	MF	GRE	Charalampos Pavlidis
7	FW	GRE	Aristidis Kokkoris
9	FW	BRA	Felype Hebert
10	MF	GRE	Andreas Tatos
12	DF	GRE	Panagiotis Tsagalidis (on loan from Aris Thessaloniki)
13	GK	POL	Tomasz Kucz
15	FW	SRB	Marko Markovski
17	FW	POR	Nani
19	DF	FRA	Randy Mavinga
20	MF	GRE	Theodoros Karoutis
23	MF	GRE	Nikos Anastasopoulos

No.	Pos.	Nation	Player
24	DF	GRE	Panagiotis Konstantinopoulos
25	FW	GRE	Giannis Loukinas
26	MF	GRE	Adriano Skenderaj
31	MF	GRE	Thanasis Papatolios
44	DF	GRE	Stavros Bounas
48	MF	BRA	Matheus Alves
57	FW	BRA	Sidney
62	DF	GRE	Timotheos Tselepidis
70	FW	GRE	Orestis Ademaj
75	DF	FRA	Junior Bakayoko
88	GK	GRE	Dimitrios Tairis
95	GK	GRE	Vangelis Karachalios
98	FW	BRA	Walisson Nem
—	FW	BRA	Hugo Borges

== Pre-season and friendlies ==
Kalamata's pre-season began on the 2nd of August at Paliambela training ground. From 9 to 22 August Kalamata was training at Portaria were the first friendly of the pre-season against Olympiacos Volos took place. Kalamata won 4–0 with M.Markovski and T.Tselepidis scoring in the first half and new signings G.Loukinas and M.Asamoah scoring in the second.

Date	Opponents	H / A	Result F–A	Scorers	Attendance
21 August 2021	Olympiacos Volos	A	4-0	Markovski 12',Tselepidis 21',Loukinas 55', Asamoah 72'	
28 August 2021	Ethnikos Peiraeus	A	1–1	Markovski 85'(pen.)	
4 September 2021	Olympiacos Volos	H	3-1	Skopelitis 11' (o.g.), Markovski 20', Moser 60'	
11 September 2021	Olympiacos B	H	2-0	Loukinas 44',Markovski 90+3'(pen.)	
18 September 2021	Panionios	A	0–1		
5 October 2021	Panathinaikos B	A	1–1	Asamoah 90+4'	

== Greek Cup ==
Date	Opponents	H / A	Result F–A	Scorers	Attendance	Comments
26 September 2021	O.F. Ierapetra F.C.	A	1-1 (a.e.t)	Tselepidis 115'		Kalamata advanced to the next round by winning 4–3 in penalty shootout.
6 October 2021	Levadiakos	A	0–2			

== Championship ==
Date	Opponents	H / A	Result F–A	Scorers	Attendance	Comments
7 November 2021	AEK Athens B F.C.	A	0–1			
20 November 2021	Panathinaikos B	H		Loukinas 56'(pen)		
24 November 2021	A.E. Karaiskakis F.C.	A	1-0	Messemo Junior Bakayoko 61'		
24 November 2021	Ergotelis F.C.	H	2-0	Markovski 45+1', Anastasopoulos 90+1'		
11 December 2021	Diagoras F.C.	H	2-0	Hebert 51', Moser 68'		
15 December 2021	Kissamikos F.C.	A	2-1	Loukinas 34',84'		
19 December 2021	Zakynthos F.C.	H	5-0	Loukinas 24',Anastasopoulos 50',Pavlidis 55', Hebert 69'，Markovski 90+1'		
29 December 2021	O.F. Ierapetra F.C.	A	2-0	Loukinas 3',87'		
13 January 2022	Irodotos F.C.	H	2-0	Tatos 20', Loukinas 38'		
16 January 2022	Levadiakos F.C.	A	0-0			
19 January 2022	Asteras Vlachioti F.C.	A	0-0			
30 January 2022	Episkopi F.C.	A	0-0			
2 February 2022	Egaleo F.C.	A	2-1	Papanikolas(og) 28',Loukinas 40'		
6 February 2022	A.E. Kifisia F.C.	H	0-1			
9 February 2022	Rodos F.C.	H	3-1	Loukinas 22',38'(pen), M.Alves 69'		
12 February 2022	AEK Athens B F.C.	H	0-0			
20 February 2022	Panathinaikos B	A	2-1	Tatos 38'(pen),Loukinas 41'		
23 February 2022	Kallithea F.C.	H	2-2	Konstantinopoulos 11',Loukinas 43'		
27 February 2022	A.E. Karaiskakis F.C.	H	2-0	Loukinas 56'(pen), Bakayoko 73'		
6 March 2022	Ergotelis F.C.	A	0-2			
9 March 2022	Asteras Vlachioti F.C.	H	1-0	Loukinas 53'		
13 March 2022	Diagoras F.C.	A	1-0	Grivas 66'		
20 March 2022	Kissamikos F.C.	H	1-1	Papatolios 61'		
20 March 2022	Zakynthos F.C.	A	1-1	Loukinas 32'		
30 March 2022	O.F. Ierapetra F.C.	H	4-0	Hebert 19',Tatos 25' (pen.), Grivas 29', Loukinas 50'		
3 April 2022	Kallithea F.C.	A	0-0			
6 April 2022	Egaleo F.C.	H	3-0	Grivas 12',35', Hebert 87'		
10 April 2022	Irodotos F.C.	A	1-2	Hebert 67'		
13 April 2022	Levadiakos F.C.	H	1-0	Tatos 67'		
17 April 2022	Rodos F.C.	A	3-0			Rodos F.C. did not enter the match
27 April 2022	Episkopi F.C.	A	5-0	Borges 2',37', Hebert 45+3', Loukinas 67',77'		
1 May 2022	A.E. Kifisia F.C.	A	2-1	Loukinas 67'(pen),85'		

== Goalscorers ==
Goals	Player
14	Giannis Loukinas
2	Marko Markovski, Nikos Anastasopoulos, Felype Hebert, Junior Bakayoko,Andreas Tatos
1	Charalambos Pavlidis, Marcos Moser, Matheus Alves,Panagiotis Konstantinopoulos
