= 2024–25 Super League Greece 2 =

Super League Greece 2
- Season: 2024–25
- Dates: 20 September 2024 – 4 May 2025
- Champions: North Group; AEL (5th second division title) (1st Super League 2 title) South Group; A.E. Kifisia (2nd second division title) (2nd Super League 2 title)
- Promoted: AEL; A.E. Kifisia
- Relegated: North Group; Diagoras; Ethnikos Neo Keramidi South Group; Panachaiki
- Top goalscorer: Giannis Pasas - (AEL) (24 goals)
- Biggest home win: A.E. Kifisia 5–0 Ilioupoli (19 October 2024); Iraklis 5–0 Kampaniakos (1 February 2025); AEL 5–0 PAS Giannina (12 April 2025)
- Biggest away win: Diagoras 0–4 Iraklis (12 January 2025)
- Highest scoring: A.E. Kifisia 4–2 AEK Athens Β (6 October 2024); Makedonikos 4–2 Kavala (20 October 2024); Niki Volos 3–3 AEL (21 October 2024); Kavala 2–4 PAS Giannina (10 November 2024) Kampaniakos 3–3 Iraklis (18 November 2024)
- Longest winning run: AEL (8 matches)
- Longest unbeaten run: AEL (26 matches)
- Longest winless run: Kavala (12 matches)
- Longest losing run: PAOK B (8 matches)
- Highest attendance: 16,000; AEL 5-0 PAS Giannina (12 April 2025)
- All statistics correct as of 4 May 2025.

The 2024–25 Super League 2 was the sixth season of the Super League 2, the second-tier Greek professional league for association football clubs, since the restructuring of the Greek football league system.

The championship was held with the participation of 20 teams, four fewer than the previous season, which were divided into two groups.

The division of the groups and the draw for the fixtures took place on 9 September 2024.

The championship began on 20 September 2024 and concluded on 4 May 2025.

== Competition ==
The championship was planned to be held with 20 teams in one group, but with the statement of Asteras Tripolis B, the teams became 21 and so it was decided that the championship would again be held in two groups, one group with 10 teams and another with 11 teams. The B Teams of PAOK and AEK Athens also compete in the league for a fourth consecutive year, while the ones of Olympiacos and Panathinaikos were dissolved, since they were relegated to Gamma Ethniki, which is an amateur division and cannot compete there. Also taking part in this year's league for the first time, is the B Team of Asteras Tripolis, which was founded for this purpose. Later on 26 August 2024, Ionikos withdrew from the championship due to financial and management problems, after having initially declared participation in the league. Thus the number of teams reduced again to 20.

=== Way of Conduct ===
The championship was played in two phases. In the first phase in each group, each team faced all opponents twice (home and away, a total of 18 matches in both Groups).

The second phase included ranking matches (play off and play out) for the first place in the group and Promotion to Super League 1, and for the relegation of four teams, those who occupied positions 9 to 10 on both Groups.

In the play offs, the first five teams in the first phase's standings participated, and they competed twice with the rest, at home and away. They included 10 matchdays and 8 matches for each team. In the play offs, the teams entered with half of the points they won in the first phase.

The teams that took the positions 6th to 10th in the regular season on both Groups, participated in the play outs. As in the play offs, the teams started with half of the points they had collected in the first phase and competed with the rest in double matches home and away (8 matches for each team in both Groups). The teams occupied the last two positions in Group A and Group B in the play outs were relegated to Gamma Ethniki.

=== Promotion and Relegation ===
A total of two teams were promoted to Super League 1, the winners of the play offs of each group and a total of 4 teams were relegated to the Gamma Ethniki.

== Team changes ==
=== From Super League Greece 2 ===
Promoted to Super League

- Levadiakos
- Athens Kallithea

Relegated to Gamma Ethniki

- Anagennisi Karditsa
- Apollon Kalamarias
- Giouchtas
- Kozani
- Tilikratis

Dissolved

- Olympiacos B
- Panathinaikos B

Relegated to Local Championships

- Aiolikos
- Ionikos

=== To Super League Greece 2 ===
Relegated from Super League

- A.E. Kifisia
- PAS Giannina

Promoted from Gamma Ethniki

- Kavala
- Ethnikos Neo Keramidi
- Panargiakos
- Panionios

== North Group ==
=== Teams, Stadiums and locations ===
Locations of the 2024–25 Super League 2 North Group clubs

Team	City	Stadium	Capacity
AEL	Larissa	AEL FC Arena	16,118
Diagoras	Rhodes	Diagoras Stadium	3,693
Ethnikos Neo Keramidi	Neo Keramidi	Katerini Stadium	4,995
Iraklis	Thessaloniki	Kaftanzoglio Stadium	27,770
Kampaniakos	Chalastra	Chalastra Municipal Stadium	670
Kavala	Kavala	Anthi Karagianni Stadium	10,550
Makedonikos	Efkarpia	Makedonikos Stadium	8,100
Niki Volos	Volos	Pantelis Magoulas Stadium	2,500
PAOK B	Efkarpia	Makedonikos Stadium	8,100
PAS Giannina	Ioannina	Zosimades Stadium	7,652

=== Personnel and Sponsoring ===
Team	Manager	Captain
AEL	(Greece) Alekos Vosniadis	(Greece) Theocharis Iliadis
Diagoras	(Greece) Apostolos Terzis	(Greece) Michalis Manias
Ethnikos Neo Keramidi	(Greece) Dimitris Pavlidis	(Greece) Dimitris Klingopoulos
Iraklis	(Greece) Pavlos Dermitzakis	(Greece) Kyriakos Kivrakidis
Kampaniakos	(Greece) Georgios Koutsis	(Greece) Stathis Savranidis
Kavala	(Greece) Giannis Tatsis	(Greece) Vasilios Gavriilidis
Makedonikos	(Greece) Sakis Papavasiliou	(Greece) Stelios Tsoukanis
Niki Volos	(Greece) Panagiotis Goutsidis	(Greece) Christos Tzioras
PAOK B	(Greece) Nikos Karageorgiou	(Greece) Vasilios Grosdis
PAS Giannina	(Greece) Nikos Badimas	(Poland) Jan Sobociński

=== Managerial changes ===
Team	Outgoing manager	Manner of departure	Date of vacancy	Position in table	Incoming manager	Date of appointment
PAS Giannina	(Greece) Giorgos Georgoulopoulos (caretaker)	End of tenure as caretaker	11 May 2024	Pre-season	(Austria) René Poms	15 July 2024
Iraklis	(Greece) Soulis Papadopoulos	End of contract	20 Μay 2024	Pre-season	(Greece) Sokratis Ofrydopoulos	18 July 2024
Niki Volos	(Greece) Dimitris Eleftheropoulos	Sacked	24 Μay 2024	Pre-season	(Greece) Stefanos Xirofotos	5 July 2024
Kavala	(Greece) Timotheos Kavakas	Sacked	11 June 2024	Pre-season	(Greece) Nikos Karampetakis	11 July 2024
Diagoras	(Serbia) Ratko Dostanić	Resigned	26 June 2024	Pre-season	(Greece) Thomas Grafas	27 June 2024
Ethnikos Neo Keramidi	(Greece) Vangelis Moras	Resigned	26 June 2024	Pre-season	(Greece) Georgios Kyriazis	12 July 2024
Kampaniakos	(Greece) Giorgos Amanatidis	End of contract	30 June 2024	Pre-season	(Greece) Kostas Georgiadis	3 July 2024
PAOK B	(Greece) Alexis Alexiadis	Sacked	20 July 2024	Pre-season	(Greece) Apostolis Papavasiliou	20 July 2024
AEL	(Greece) Pavlos Dermitzakis	Sacked	17 September 2024	Pre-season	(Greece) Alekos Vosniadis	18 September 2024
Iraklis	(Greece) Sokratis Ofrydopoulos	Sacked	5 October 2024	6th	(Greece) Thanasis Staikos	9 October 2024
Diagoras	(Greece) Thomas Grafas	Resigned	8 October 2024	10th	(Greece) Vaggelis Chosadas (caretaker)	8 October 2024
Diagoras	(Greece) Vaggelis Chosadas (caretaker)	End of tenure as caretaker	14 October 2024	9th	(Greece) Apostolos Terzis	14 October 2024
PAS Giannina	(Austria) René Poms	Sacked	21 October 2024	3rd	(Greece) Vagelis Tziarras (care taker)	21 October 2024
PAS Giannina	(Greece) Vagelis Tziarras	End of tenure as caretaker	27 October 2024	4rd	(Paraguay) Ariel Galeano	27 October 2024
Kavala	(Greece) Nikos Karampetakis	Resigned	28 October 2024	9th	(Greece) Konstantinos Anyfantakis	30 October 2024
Makedonikos	(Greece) Stelios Malezas	Sacked	30 October 2024	3rd	(Greece) Sakis Papavasiliou	30 October 2024
Iraklis	(Greece) Thanasis Staikos	Sacked	2 November 2024	7th	(Greece) Akis Stoltidis	2 November 2024
Ethnikos Neo Keramidi	(Greece) Georgios Kyriazis	Sacked	4 November 2024	10th	(Greece) Nikos Theodosiadis	6 November 2024
Iraklis	(Greece) Akis Stoltidis	Sacked	20 November 2024	5th	(Greece) Pavlos Dermitzakis	20 November 2024
Kavala	(Greece) Konstantinos Anyfantakis	Resigned	18 December 2024	10th	(Greece) Giorgos Angelidis	18 December 2024
PAOK B	(Greece) Apostolis Papavasiliou	Sacked	27 December 2024	7th	(Greece) Nikos Karageorgiou	28 December 2024
Kavala	(Greece) Giorgos Angelidis	End of tenure as caretaker	8 January 2025	10th	(Greece) Giannis Tatsis	8 January 2025
Niki Volos	(Greece) Stefanos Xirofotos	Sacked	27 January 2025	6th	(Greece) Panagiotis Goutsidis	28 January 2025
Ethnikos Neo Keramidi	(Greece) Nikos Theodosiadis	Sacked	3 February 2025	10th	(Greece) Dimitris Pavlidis (caretaker)	3 February 2025
PAS Giannina	(Paraguay) Ariel Galeano	Sacked	6 February 2025	3rd	(Greece) Nikos Badimas	6 February 2025
Kampaniakos	(Greece) Kostas Georgiadis	Resigned	23 February 2025	3rd	(Greece) Georgios Koutsis	25 February 2025

=== League Table ===
Pos	Team	Pld	W	D	L	GF	GA	GD	Pts	Promotion or relegation (Note: PAOK B is ineligible for promotion.)
1	AEL	18	15	3	0	37	9	+28	48	Qualification for the Play-off round
2	Iraklis	18	11	3	4	31	14	+17	36	Qualification for the Play-off round
3	PAS Giannina	18	8	7	3	23	21	+2	31	Qualification for the Play-off round
4	Makedonikos	18	8	3	7	24	22	+2	27	Qualification for the Play-off round
5	Kampaniakos	18	7	5	6	25	26	−1	26	Qualification for the Play-off round
6	Niki Volos	18	4	9	5	20	21	−1	21	Qualification for the Play-out round
7	PAOK B	18	6	2	10	21	25	−4	20	Qualification for the Play-out round
8	Diagoras	18	3	7	8	7	18	−11	16	Qualification for the Play-out round
9	Kavala	18	2	6	10	11	28	−17	12	Qualification for the Play-out round
10	Ethnikos Neo Keramidi	18	1	5	12	8	23	−15	8	Qualification for the Play-out round

Source: sl2.gr
Rules for classification: 1) Points; 2) Head-to-head points; 3) Head-to-head goal difference; 4) Goal difference; 5) Goals scored; 6) Goals against; 7) Play-offs (neutral ground); 8) Draw.
(Note: Criteria 7 is only used if needed to decide champion, teams for relegation).

=== Results ===
Home \ Away	AEL	DIA	ENK	IRA	KAM	KAV	MAK	NKV	PKB	PAS
AEL	—	3–0	1–0	3–0	3–0	2–1	2–0	3–0	2–1	1–1
Diagoras	0–1	—	0–0	0–4	0–1	1–1	0–0	0–0	1–0	0–0
Ethnikos Neo Keramidi	1–3	0–0	—	0–1	0–0	0–1	1–2	0–2	2–3	0–1
Iraklis	1–2	1–0	1–0	—	5–0	1–1	3–0	2–1	2–0	3–1
Kampaniakos	0–2	1–0	3–0	3–3	—	3–1	1–1	2–0	1–3	2–2
Kavala	0–3	0–0	0–0	0–1	0–2	—	1–0	1–1	0–1	2–4
Makedonikos	0–1	3–1	2–1	0–2	1–0	4–2	—	0–0	3–1	3–1
Niki Volos	3–3	0–1	2–2	1–0	2–2	2–0	0–3	—	1–1	1–1
PAOK B	0–1	1–2	0–1	0–0	1–3	3–0	2–1	0–4	—	4–0
PAS Giannina	1–1	2–1	1–0	2–1	2–1	0–0	3–1	0–0	1–0	—

Source: sl2.gr
Legend: Blue = home team win; Yellow = draw; Red = away team win.
For upcoming matches, an "a" indicates there is an article about the rivalry between the two participants.

The draw for the Play-off and Play-out rounds took place on 14 February 2025, with first matches played on 23 February 2025.

=== Play-off round ===
In the play-offs, the first five teams in the first phase's standings participated, and they competed twice with the rest, at home and away to decide the North Group's Champion who was also promoted to next year's Super League 1. They included 10 matchdays and 8 matches for each team. The teams entered with half of the points they had won in the first phase.

Pos	Team	Pld	W	D	L	GF	GA	GD	Pts	Promotion
1	AEL (C, P)	8	5	3	0	21	6	+15	42	Promotion to Super League 1
2	Iraklis	8	5	3	0	18	7	+11	36	
3	PAS Giannina	8	2	3	3	12	17	−5	25	
4	Kampaniakos	8	1	2	5	9	21	−12	18	
5	Makedonikos	8	1	1	6	8	17	−9	18	

Source: sl2.gr
Rules for classification: 1) Points; 2) Regular season position
(C) Champions; (P) Promoted

=== Play-off Results ===
Home \ Away	AEL	IRA	MAK	PAS	KAM
AEL	—	1–1	3–0	5–0	4–1
Iraklis	2–2	—	2–1	2–2	3–0
Makedonikos	0–3	1–2	—	3–1	1–1
PAS Giannina	1–1	0–3	2–0	—	4–1
Kampaniakos	1–2	0–3	3–2	2–2	—

Source: sl2.gr
Legend: Blue = home team win; Yellow = draw; Red = away team win.
For upcoming matches, an "a" indicates there is an article about the rivalry between the two participants.

=== Play-out round ===
The teams that took the positions 6th to 10th in the regular season participated in the play-outs. As in the play-offs, the teams started with half of the points they collected in the first phase and competed with the rest in double matches home and away (8 matches for each team). The teams that occupied the last two positions in the play outs were relegated to next year's Gamma Ethniki.

Pos	Team	Pld	W	D	L	GF	GA	GD	Pts	Relegation
1	PAOK B	8	3	4	1	7	4	+3	23	
2	Niki Volos	8	2	5	1	7	8	−1	22	
3	Kavala	8	4	4	0	9	4	+5	22	
4	Diagoras (Note: 6 points are deducted permanently from Diagoras by decision of the Court of Arbitration of the HFF.) (R)	8	3	2	3	9	7	+2	13	Relegation to Gamma Ethniki
5	Ethnikos Neo Keramidi (R)	8	0	1	7	2	11	−9	5	Relegation to Gamma Ethniki

Source: sl2.gr
Rules for classification: 1) Points; 2) Regular season position
(R) Relegated

=== Play-out Results ===
Home \ Away	PKB	NKV	KAV	DIA	ENK
PAOK B	—	1–1	0–0	0–0	2–1
Niki Volos	1–1	—	1–1	2–1	1–0
Kavala	1–0	0–0	—	2–1	1–0
Diagoras	0–1	3–0	2–2	—	1–0
Ethnikos Neo Keramidi	0–2	1–1	0–2	0–1	—

Source: sl2.gr
Legend: Blue = home team win; Yellow = draw; Red = away team win.
For upcoming matches, an "a" indicates there is an article about the rivalry between the two participants.

== South Group ==
=== Teams, Stadiums and locations ===
Locations of the 2024–25 Super League 2 South Group clubs

Team	Location	Stadium	Capacity
AEK Athens Β	Spata	Serafidio Stadium	3,000
A.E. Kifisia	Kifissia	Zirineio Municipal Stadium	1,650
Asteras Tripolis B	Tripoli	Theodoros Kolokotronis Stadium	7,416
Chania	Chania	Perivolia Municipal Stadium	4,527
Egaleo	Aigaleo	Stavros Mavrothalassitis Stadium	8,217
Ilioupoli	Ilioupoli	Ilioupoli Municipal Stadium	2,000
Kalamata	Kalamata	Kalamata Municipal Stadium	5,613
Panachaiki	Patra	Kostas Davourlis Stadium	11,321
Panargiakos	Argos	Argos Municipal Stadium	5,000
Panionios	Nea Smyrni	Nea Smyrni Stadium	11,700

=== Personnel and sponsoring ===
Team	Manager	Captain
AEK Athens Β	(Greece) Nikos Kostenoglou	(Greece) Georgios Theocharis
A.E. Kifisia	(Argentina) Sebastián Leto	(Greece) Panagiotis Pritsas
Asteras Tripolis B	(Greece) Giorgos Simos	(Greece) Georgios Kosteas
Chania	(Greece) Sokratis Ofrydopoulos	(Greece) Kaloudis Lemonis
Egaleo	(Greece) Apostolos Charalampidis	(Greece) Angelos Zioulis
Ilioupoli	(Greece) Thomas Grafas	(Greece) Spyros Fourlanos
Kalamata	(Greece) Dimitrios Spanos	(Greece) Panagiotis Konstantinopoulos
Panachaiki	(Greece) Sotiris Antoniou	(Greece) Lyberis Stergidis
Panargiakos	(Cameroon) Guy Feutchine	(Greece) Giannis Paidakis
Panionios	(Greece) Nontas Koutromanos	(Greece) Anastasios Avlonitis

=== Managerial changes ===
Team	Outgoing manager	Manner of departure	Date of vacancy	Position in table	Incoming manager	Date of appointment
Panionios	(Greece) Kostas Georgiadis	End of contract	13 May 2024	Pre-season	(Greece) Antonis Nikopolidis	20 May 2024
A.E. Kifisia	(Greece) Kostas Bratsos	Sacked	23 May 2024	Pre-season	(Argentina) Sebastián Leto	17 June 2024
Chania	(Greece) Giannis Taousianis	Sacked	17 June 2024	Pre-season	(Greece) Dimitrios Spanos	20 June 2024
Ilioupoli	(Greece) Nikos Pantelis	Resigned	22 June 2024	Pre-season	(Greece) Sakis Papavasiliou	10 July 2024
Ilioupoli	(Greece) Sakis Papavasiliou	Sacked	9 October 2024	6th	(Greece) Thomas Grafas	11 October 2024
Chania	(Greece) Dimitrios Spanos	Resigned	13 October 2024	10th	(Greece) Sokratis Ofrydopoulos	16 October 2024
Panachaiki	(Greece) Giannis Tatsis	Sacked	16 October 2024	7th	(Greece) Soulis Papadopoulos	17 October 2024
Kalamata	(Greece) Nikos Anastopoulos	Sacked	21 October 2024	3rd	(Greece) Dimitrios Spanos	21 October 2024
Asteras Tripolis B	(Greece) Staikos Vergetis	Sacked	13 November 2024	9th	(Greece) Giorgos Simos	15 November 2024
AEK Athens Β	(Greece) Nikos Koustas	Sacked	21 November 2024	8th	(Greece) Gennaios Karachalios (caretaker)	21 November 2024
AEK Athens Β	(Greece) Gennaios Karachalios (caretaker)	End of tenure as caretaker	5 December 2024	8th	(Greece) Nikos Kostenoglou	5 December 2024
Panachaiki	(Greece) Soulis Papadopoulos	Resigned	22 December 2024	8th	(Greece) Dimitris Kalaitzidis	24 December 2024
Panionios	(Greece) Antonis Nikopolidis	Sacked	31 January 2025	3rd	(Greece) Nontas Koutromanos	1 February 2025
Panachaiki	(Greece) Dimitris Kalaitzidis	Sacked	31 January 2025	10th	(Greece) Sotiris Antoniou	18 January 2025
Panargiakos	(Greece) Georgios Vazakas	Resigned	17 January 2025	10th	(Cameroon) Guy Feutchine	21 January 2025

=== League Table ===
Pos	Team	Pld	W	D	L	GF	GA	GD	Pts	Promotion or relegation (Note: AEK Athens B and Asteras Tripolis B are ineligible for promotion.)
1	A.E. Kifisia	18	14	3	1	40	13	+27	45	Qualification for the Play-off round
2	Kalamata	18	13	4	1	27	10	+17	43	Qualification for the Play-off round
3	Panionios	18	9	7	2	27	12	+15	34	Qualification for the Play-off round
4	Egaleo	18	6	5	7	14	21	−7	23	Qualification for the Play-off round
5	Ilioupoli	18	5	5	8	17	29	−12	20	Qualification for the Play-off round
6	AEK Athens Β	18	4	7	7	20	26	−6	19	Qualification for the Play-out round
7	Chania	18	4	5	9	19	21	−2	17	Qualification for the Play-out round
8	Panargiakos	18	4	3	11	14	26	−12	15	Qualification for the Play-out round
9	Asteras Tripolis B	18	3	6	9	16	27	−11	15	Qualification for the Play-out round
10	Panachaiki	18	3	5	10	11	20	−9	14	Qualification for the Play-out round

Source: sl2.gr
Rules for classification: 1) Points; 2) Head-to-head points; 3) Head-to-head goal difference; 4) Goal difference; 5) Goals scored; 6) Goals against; 7) Play-offs (neutral ground); 8) Draw.
(Note: Criteria 7 is only used if needed to decide champion, teams for relegation).

=== Results ===
Home \ Away	AKB	AST	CHA	EGA	ILP	KAL	KIF	PAN	PAR	PIO
AEK Athens Β	—	2–1	0–3	1–1	2–2	2–2	2–3	0–0	0–2	0–0
Asteras Tripolis B	2–0	—	1–1	0–0	1–1	1–3	0–3	2–1	1–3	0–0
Chania	0–1	2–0	—	3–0	3–2	1–2	0–3	0–0	1–2	1–1
Egaleo	0–0	1–0	1–0	—	2–0	1–1	0–0	3–1	1–0	1–2
Ilioupoli	3–3	1–0	1–0	1–3	—	0–2	0–2	2–1	1–1	1–1
Kalamata	1–0	2–0	2–1	3–0	1–0	—	1–1	1–0	2–1	1–1
A.E. Kifisia	4–2	3–3	2–1	4–0	5–0	1–0	—	2–0	1–0	2–1
Panachaiki	0–1	1–0	0–0	2–0	0–1	0–1	1–2	—	1–1	1–1
Panargiakos	0–3	1–2	2–2	1–0	0–1	0–1	0–2	0–1	—	0–2
Panionios	2–1	2–2	1–0	2–0	2–0	0–1	2–0	3–1	4–0	—

Source: sl2.gr
Legend: Blue = home team win; Yellow = draw; Red = away team win.
For upcoming matches, an "a" indicates there is an article about the rivalry between the two participants.

The draw for the Play-off and Play-out rounds took place on 14 February 2025, with first matches to be played on 22 February 2025.

=== Play-off round ===
In the play-offs, the first five teams in the first phase's standings participated, and they competed twice with the rest, at home and away to decide the South Group's Champion who was also promoted to next year's Super League 1. They included 10 matchdays and 8 matches for each team. The teams entered with half of the points they had won in the first phase.

Pos	Team	Pld	W	D	L	GF	GA	GD	Pts	Promotion
1	A.E. Kifisia (C, P)	8	6	2	0	9	0	+9	43	Promotion to Super League 1
2	Kalamata	8	6	1	1	14	4	+10	41	
3	Panionios	8	4	1	3	12	6	+6	30	
4	Egaleo	8	1	0	7	3	14	−11	15	
5	Ilioupoli	8	1	0	7	2	16	−14	13	

Source: sl2.gr
Rules for classification: 1) Points; 2) Regular season position
(C) Champions; (P) Promoted

=== Play-off Results ===
Home \ Away	KIF	KAL	PIO	EGA	ILP
A.E. Kifisia	—	0–0	0–0	1–0	2–0
Kalamata	0–1	—	2–0	4–1	2–0
Panionios	0–1	1–2	—	2–1	2–0
Egaleo	0–1	0–1	0–4	—	1–0
Ilioupoli	0–3	1–3	0–3	1–0	—

Source: sl2.gr
Legend: Blue = home team win; Yellow = draw; Red = away team win.
For upcoming matches, an "a" indicates there is an article about the rivalry between the two participants.

=== Play-out round ===
The teams that took the positions 6th to 10th in the regular season participated in the play-outs. As in the play-offs, the teams started with half of the points they collected in the first phase and competed with the rest in double matches home and away (8 matches for each team). The teams that occupied the last two positions in the play outs were relegated to next year's Gamma Ethniki. Moreover, if a reserve team (B) was relegated, an other team from the same group was relegated.

Pos	Team	Pld	W	D	L	GF	GA	GD	Pts	Relegation
1	Chania	8	4	2	2	10	7	+3	23	
2	Panargiakos (Note: Although Panargiakos was relegated due to the relegation of AEK B, it ultimately remained in the category, following a decision by the Court of Arbitration.)	8	3	2	3	9	8	+1	19	
3	Asteras Tripolis B	8	3	1	4	10	10	0	18	
4	AEK Athens Β	8	1	3	4	4	8	−4	16	Replacement (Note: Due to finishing in relegation position, AEK B will be replaced in the next championship by the champion team of the U19 Super League championship, which will be Olympiacos.)
5	Panachaiki (Note: On 2 May 2025, Panachaiki were deducted 15 points, and got expelled from the championship, due to debts towards five former players. Last matchday's away game against Panargiakos forfeit.) (R, E)	8	4	2	2	8	8	0	6	Relegation to Gamma Ethniki

Source: sl2.gr
Rules for classification: 1) Points; 2) Regular season position
(E) Expelled; (R) Relegated

=== Play-out Results ===
Home \ Away	CHA	PAN	AST	AKB	PAR
Chania	—	1–0	2–2	0–1	2–0
Panachaiki	2–2	—	1–0	1–0	1–0
Asteras Tripolis B	1–2	1–2	—	1–0	3–2
AEK Athens Β	0–1	1–1	0–2	—	2–2
Panargiakos	1–0	3–0	1–0	0–0	—

Source: sl2.gr
Legend: Blue = home team win; Yellow = draw; Red = away team win.
For upcoming matches, an "a" indicates there is an article about the rivalry between the two participants.

== Super Cup ==
=== Final ===
11 May 2025
17:00 EEST

AEL	1–0	A.E. Kifisia
Stamou 84'	Report

AEL FC Arena, Larissa
