= 2023–24 Super League Greece 2 =

Super League Greece 2
- Season: 2023–24
- Dates: 23 September 2023 – 26 May 2024
- Champions: Levadiakos (2nd title); Athens Kallithea (1st title)
- Promoted: Levadiakos; Athens Kallithea
- Relegated: Aiolikos; Anagennisi Karditsa; Apollon Pontus; Kozani Giouchtas; Olympiacos B Panathinaikos B Tilikratis
- Matches: 342
- Goals: 584 (1.71 per match)
- Top goalscorer: Giorgos Manalis; Giannis Loukinas (18 goals)
- Biggest home win: Niki Volos 5–0 Apollon Pontus (21 February 2024)
- Biggest away win: Panathinaikos B 1–4 Kalamata (24 September 2023)
- Highest scoring: Aiolikos 4–2 Kampaniakos (26 November 2023); Ionikos 5–1 Egaleo (13 December 2023); Iraklis 5–1 Makedonikos (18 December 2023)
- Longest winning run: Levadiakos (10 matches)
- Longest unbeaten run: AEL (22 matches)
- Longest winless run: Panachaiki (13 matches)
- Longest losing run: Apollon Pontus (7 matches)
- Highest attendance: 12,000; AEL 0–0 Levadiakos (25 February 2024)

The 2023–24 Super League 2 was the fifth season of the Super League 2, the second-tier Greek professional league for association football clubs, since the restructuring of the Greek football league system.

The league was conducted by 24 teams and two groups, this was due to the restructure and abolishment of the Football League. The B Teams of Olympiacos, PAOK, Panathinaikos and AEK Athens also competed in the league for a third consecutive year.

== Competition ==
The championship is held with the participation of a total of 24 teams, six less than the previous season, which were divided into two groups. The deadline for submitting declarations of participation was set at 2 August 2023. The division of the groups and the draw took place on September 11.

The championship was planned to be played with 26 teams. Apollon Smyrnis did not participate and was replaced by the first runner-up team from the 3rd national division, Giouchtas, which had taken the 5th place in the promotion play offs. Before the draw, Ierapetra announced his withdrawal from the league, but without being replaced. So the draw included 25 teams in two groups of 13 and 12 teams.

Although Almopos Aridaias participated normally in the draw, he was expelled from the league following a decision by the Disciplinary Body of Super League 2 as he did not secure a certificate of participation from the E.E.A. After a week the team was vindicated by the Appeals Committee, but was permanently expelled a few days later by a decision of the Board of Directors of the organizing authority. Thus, the division was definitively left with 24 teams, without a new draw in Group A.

=== Way of Conduct ===
The championship will be played in two phases. In the first phase in each group, each team will face all opponents twice (home and away, a total of 22 matches, in 22 games in Group A and 22 games in Group B). At the end of the first phase, the teams finishing 12th in each group will be directly relegated.

The second phase includes ranking matches (play off and play out) for the first place in the group and Promotion to Super League 1, and for the relegation of three more teams, those who will occupy positions 9 to 11.

In the play offs, the first five in the first phase's standings will participate, and they will compete twice with the rest, at home and away. They will include 10 matchdays and 8 matches for each team. In the play offs, the teams will enter with half of the points they had won in the first phase.

The teams that will take the positions 6th to 11th in the regular season will participate in the play outs. As in the play offs, the teams will start with half of the points they collected in the first phase and compete with the rest in double matches home and away (10 matches, 10 matches for each team). The teams that occupy the last three positions in the play outs will be relegated to Gamma Ethniki.

=== Promotion and Relegation ===
A total of two teams will be promoted to Super League 1, the winners of the play offs of each group and a total of 8 teams will be relegated to the Gamma Ethniki.

== Team changes ==
=== From Super League Greece 2 ===
Promoted to Super League

- Levadiakos

Relegated to Gamma Ethniki

- Veria
- Thesprotos
- Apollon Smyrnis
- Proodeftiki
- Episkopi

Relegated to Local Championships

- Apollon Larissa
- Irodotos
- Iraklis Larissa
- PAO Rouf
- Ierapetra

=== To Super League Greece 2 ===
Relegated from Super League

- A.E. Kifisia

Promoted from Gamma Ethniki

- Aiolikos
- Kampaniakos
- Kozani
- Tilikratis
- Giouchtas

== North Group ==
Locations of the 2023–24 Super League 2 North Group clubs

=== Teams ===
Team	City	Stadium	Capacity
AEK Athens B	Spata	Spata Training Centre	3,000
AEL	Larissa	AEL Arena	16,118
Aiolikos	Mytilene	Μytilene Municipal Stadium	3,000
Anagennisi Karditsa	Karditsa	Municipal Stadium Karditsa	3,500
Apollon Pontus	Polykastro	Polykastro Stadium	1,000
Iraklis	Thessaloniki	Kaftanzoglio Stadium	27,770
Kampaniakos	Chalastra	Chalastra Municipal Stadium	670
Kozani	Kozani	Kozani Municipal Stadium	4,000
Levadiakos	Livadeia	Livadeia Municipal Stadium	5,915
Makedonikos	Efkarpia	Makedonikos Stadium	8,100
Niki Volos	Volos	Panthessaliko Stadium	22,700
PAOK B	Efkarpia	Makedonikos Stadium	8,100

=== Personnel and sponsoring ===
Team	Manager	Captain	Kit manufacturer
AEK Athens B	(Greece) Nikos Koustas	(Bosnia and Herzegovina) Vedad Radonja	Nike
AEL	(Greece) Pavlos Dermitzakis	(Greece) Thanasis Papageorgiou	Legea
Aiolikos	(Serbia) Slobodan Krcmarevic	(Greece) Giorgos Manousos	Kappa
Anagennisi Karditsa	(Greece) Giorgos Tyriakidis	(Greece) Nikos Golias	Nike
Apollon Pontus	(France) Cyril Kali	(Greece) Dimitrios Amarantidis	Nike
Iraklis	(Greece) Soulis Papadopoulos	(Greece) Vasilis Vitlis	Joma
Kampaniakos	(Greece) Giorgos Amanatidis	(Greece) Stathis Savranidis	Macron
Kozani	(Greece) Angelos Digozis	(Greece) Xenofon Panos	Admiral
Levadiakos	(Greece) Sokratis Ofridopoulos	(Honduras) Alfredo Mejia	Macron
Makedonikos	(Greece) Stelios Malezas	(Greece) Stelios Tsoukanis	Givova
Niki Volos	(Greece) Dimitris Eleftheropoulos	(Greece) Pavlos Kyriakidis	Macron
PAOK B	(Greece) Alexis Alexiadis	(Greece) Kyriakos Giaxis	Macron

=== Managerial changes ===
Team	Outgoing manager	Manner of departure	Date of vacancy	Position in table	Incoming manager	Date of appointment
Anagennisi Karditsa	(Greece) Periklis Amanatidis	End of contract	17 June 2023	Pre-season	(Greece) Giorgos Tyriakidis	24 July 2023
Levadiakos	(Greece) Giannis Petrakis	End of contract	17 June 2023	Pre-season	(Greece) Nikos Nioplias	1 July 2023
PAOK B	(Uruguay) Pablo García	End of contract	17 June 2023	Pre-season	(Greece) Alexis Alexiadis	8 August 2023
Apollon Pontus	(Greece) Dimitris Kalaitzidis	Sacked	29 June 2023	Pre-season	(France) Cyril Kali	1 July 2023
AEL	(Greece) Panagiotis Goutsidis	Sacked	3 October 2023	8th	(Greece) Pavlos Dermitzakis	7 October 2023
Iraklis	(Greece) Sakis Tsiolis	Sacked	17 November 2023	8th	(Greece) Periklis Amanatidis	20 Νοvember 2023
Aiolikos	(Greece) Apostolos Charalampidis	Sacked	16 November 2023	11th	(Greece) Charalampos Pentarvanis (caretaker)	16 November 2023
Aiolikos	(Greece) Charalampos Pentarvanis (caretaker)	End of tenure as caretaker	18 November 2023	11th	(Serbia) Slobodan Krcmarevic	18 November 2023
Kampaniakos	(Greece) Ilias Sapanis	Resign	24 November 2023	10th	(Greece) Giorgos Amanatidis	27 November 2023
Levadiakos	(Greece) Nikos Nioplias	Sacked	18 December 2023	2nd	(Greece) Sokratis Ofridopoulos	19 December 2023
Iraklis	(Greece) Periklis Amanatidis	Sacked	6 March 2024	8th	(Greece) Soulis Papadopoulos	7 March 2024

=== League Table ===
Pos	Team	Pld	W	D	L	GF	GA	GD	Pts	Promotion or relegation (Note: PAOK B and AEK Athens B are ineligible for promotion.)
1	Levadiakos (Q)	22	17	4	1	36	9	+27	55	Qualification for the Play-off round
2	AEL (Q)	22	14	7	1	32	12	+20	49	Qualification for the Play-off round
3	Niki Volos (Q)	22	10	2	10	33	24	+9	32	Qualification for the Play-off round
4	AEK Athens B (Q)	22	8	8	6	23	17	+6	32	Qualification for the Play-off round
5	Makedonikos (Q)	22	7	10	5	24	23	+1	31	Qualification for the Play-off round
6	PAOK B (Q)	22	9	3	10	31	27	+4	30	Qualification for the Play-out round
7	Anagennisi Karditsa (Q)	22	8	5	9	22	24	−2	29	Qualification for the Play-out round
8	Iraklis (Q)	22	7	8	7	25	20	+5	29	Qualification for the Play-out round
9	Kozani (Q)	22	6	6	10	10	17	−7	24	Qualification for the Play-out round
10	Kampaniakos (Q)	22	7	2	13	18	32	−14	23	Qualification for the Play-out round
11	Aiolikos (Q)	22	4	7	11	20	36	−16	19	Qualification for the Play-out round
12	Apollon Pontus (R)	22	3	2	17	12	45	−33	11	Relegation to Gamma Ethniki

Source: sl2.gr
Rules for classification: 1) Points; 2) Head-to-head points; 3) Head-to-head goal difference; 4) Goal difference; 5) Goals scored; 6) Goals against; 7) Play-offs (neutral ground); 8) Draw.
(Note: Criteria 7 is only used if needed to decide champion, teams for relegation).
(Q) Qualified for the phase indicated; (R) Relegated

=== Results ===
Home \ Away	AKB	AEL	AIL	ANK	APP	IRA	KAM	KOZ	LEV	MAK	NKV	PKB
AEK Athens B	—	3–0	2–1	0–0	4–0	0–0	1–0	1–0	0–1	0–0	0–3	1–0
AEL	1–1	—	2–0	1–0	3–0	1–0	2–1	2–0	0–0	1–1	1–0	2–0
Aiolikos	0–2	1–1	—	1–1	3–1	1–1	4–2	0–0	0–3	1–3	0–2	2–2
Anagennisi Karditsa	2–1	0–2	3–1	—	4–1	2–1	0–1	1–1	2–0	0–1	2–0	0–3
Apollon Pontus	2–2	1–3	0–1	2–1	—	0–1	2–0	0–0	0–1	0–3	1–3	0–1
Iraklis	1–0	1–1	3–0	1–1	0–1	—	2–2	1–1	0–1	5–1	1–0	2–0
Kampaniakos	1–1	0–2	1–0	0–1	1–0	1–3	—	0–1	0–2	1–2	0–2	2–0
Kozani	0–1	0–2	1–2	1–0	1–0	1–0	0–1	—	0–0	2–0	0–3	0–1
Levadiakos	2–1	1–1	2–0	3–0	1–0	2–0	3–0	1–0	—	2–1	2–0	3–1
Makedonikos	1–1	0–0	1–1	0–0	3–1	0–0	0–1	0–0	2–2	—	0–0	3–2
Niki Volos	1–1	1–2	3–1	1–2	5–0	3–1	2–0	0–1	0–1	1–2	—	3–2
PAOK B	1–0	1–2	0–0	2–0	4–0	1–1	2–3	1–0	1–3	2–0	4–0	—

Source: sl2.gr
Legend: Blue = home team win; Yellow = draw; Red = away team win.
For upcoming matches, an "a" indicates there is an article about the rivalry between the two participants.

=== Play-off round ===
In the play-offs, the first five teams in the first phase's standings will participate, and they will compete twice with the rest, at home and away to decide the North Group's Champion who will also be promoted to next year's Super League 1. They will include 10 matchdays and 8 matches for each team. The teams will enter with half of the points they had won in the first phase.

Pos	Team	Pld	W	D	L	GF	GA	GD	Pts	Promotion
1	Levadiakos (C, P)	8	6	1	1	17	5	+12	47	Promotion to Super League 1
2	AEL	8	2	4	2	16	14	+2	35	
3	Makedonikos	8	2	3	3	13	15	−2	25	
4	Niki Volos	8	2	3	3	8	11	−3	25	
5	AEK Athens B	8	1	3	4	9	18	−9	22	

Source: sl2.gr
Rules for classification: 1) Points; 2) Head-to-head points; 3) Head-to-head goal difference; 4) Goal difference; 5) Goals scored; 6) Goals against; 7) Play-offs (neutral ground); 8) Draw.
(Note: Criteria 7 is only used if needed to decide champion.)
(C) Champions; (P) Promoted

=== Play-off Results ===
Home \ Away	LEV	AEL	MAK	NKV	AKB
Levadiakos	—	1–2	2–0	2–0	4–0
AEL	2–2	—	1–1	2–3	3–0
Makedonikos	1–3	3–2	—	3–1	1–2
Niki Volos	0–1	1–1	1–1	—	1–0
AEK Athens B	0–2	3–3	3–3	1–1	—

Source: sl2.gr
Legend: Blue = home team win; Yellow = draw; Red = away team win.
For upcoming matches, an "a" indicates there is an article about the rivalry between the two participants.

=== Play-out round ===
The teams that will take the positions 6th to 11th in the regular season will participate in the play-outs. As in the play-offs, the teams will start with half of the points they collected in the first phase and compete with the rest in double matches home and away (10 matches, 10 matches for each team). The teams that occupy the last three positions in the play outs will be relegated to next year's Gamma Ethniki.

Pos	Team	Pld	W	D	L	GF	GA	GD	Pts	Relegation
1	PAOK B	10	6	1	3	21	17	+4	34	
2	Iraklis	10	3	6	1	10	8	+2	30	
3	Kampaniakos	10	5	2	3	12	9	+3	29	
4	Kozani (R)	10	3	5	2	15	12	+3	26	Relegation to Gamma Ethniki
5	Anagennisi Karditsa (R)	10	2	4	4	6	10	−4	25	Relegation to Gamma Ethniki
6	Aiolikos (R)	10	1	2	7	7	15	−8	15	Relegation to Local Championships

Source: sl2.gr
Rules for classification: 1) Points; 2) Head-to-head points; 3) Head-to-head goal difference; 4) Goal difference; 5) Goals scored; 6) Goals against; 7) Play-offs (neutral ground); 8) Draw.
(Note: Criteria 7 is only used if needed to decide champion.)
(R) Relegated

=== Play-out Results ===
Home \ Away	PKB	IRA	KAM	KOZ	ANK	AIL
PAOK B	—	2–2	1–0	4–2	2–0	2–1
Iraklis	2–1	—	1–2	1–1	0–0	1–0
Kampaniakos	4–2	0–1	—	1–0	0–0	0–1
Kozani	3–1	1–1	2–2	—	1–0	4–1
Anagennisi Karditsa	2–4	0–0	0–1	1–1	—	2–1
Aiolikos	1–2	1–1	1–2	0–0	0–1	—

Source: sl2.gr
Legend: Blue = home team win; Yellow = draw; Red = away team win.
For upcoming matches, an "a" indicates there is an article about the rivalry between the two participants.

== South Group ==
Locations of the 2023–24 Super League 2 South Group clubs

=== Teams ===
Team	City	Stadium	Capacity
Chania	Chania	Perivolia Municipal Stadium	4,527
Diagoras	Rhodes	Diagoras Stadium	3,693
Egaleo	Aigaleo	Stavros Mavrothalassitis Stadium	8,217
Giouchtas	Archanes	Ierapetra Municipal Stadium	3,000
Ilioupoli	Ilioupoli	Ilioupoli Municipal Stadium	2,000
Ionikos	Nikaia	Neapoli Municipal Stadium	6,000
Kalamata	Kalamata	Kalamata Municipal Stadium	5,613
Athens Kallithea	Kallithea	Grigoris Lambrakis Stadium	6,300
Olympiacos B	Piraeus	Rentis Training Centre	3,000
Panachaiki	Patra	Kostas Davourlis Stadium	11,321
Panathinaikos B	Marousi	Olympic Stadium of Athens	69,618
Tilikratis	Lefkada	Lefkada Municipal Stadium	1,300

=== Personnel and sponsoring ===
Team	Manager	Captain	Kit manufacturer
Chania	(Greece) Giannis Taousianis	(Greece) Christos Batzios	Saller
Diagoras	(Greece) Thomas Grafas	(Greece) Michalis Manias	Nike
Egaleo	(Greece) Apostolos Charalampidis	(Greece) Christos Kollas	Givova
Giouchtas	(Greece) Nikos Sourgias	(Greece) Minas Tzanis	Legea
Ilioupoli	(Greece) Nikos Pantelis	(Greece) Giannis Gotsoulias	Legea
Ionikos	(Greece) Dimitris Spanos	(Greece) Kostas Tsirigotis	Kappa
Kalamata	(Greece) Apostolos Terzis	(Greece) Vasilis Triantafyllakis	Nike
Kallithea	(Greece) Alekos Vosniadis	(Greece) Giannis Loukinas	Kappa
Olympiacos B	(Argentina) Ariel Ibagaza	(Cyprus) Giannis Kosti	Adidas
Panachaiki	(Greece) Giannis Tatsis	(Greece) Anestis Nastos	Macron
Panathinaikos B	(Greece) Sotiris Antoniou	(Greece) Andreas Athanasakopoulos	Adidas
Tilikratis	(Cyprus) Andreas Pantziaras	(Albania) Klajdi Toska	Admiral

=== Managerial changes ===
Team	Outgoing manager	Manner of departure	Date of vacancy	Position in table	Incoming manager	Date of appointment
Ionikos	(Greece) Michalis Grigoriou	Sacked	13 May 2023	Pre-season	(Greece) Giorgos Simos	5 July 2023
Egaleo	(Greece) Georgios Koudounis (caretaker)	End of tenure as caretaker	18 June 2023	Pre-season	(Montenegro) Dragan Zukanović	24 July 2023
Kalamata	(Greece) Antonis Mavreas (caretaker)	End of tenure as caretaker	18 June 2023	Pre-season	(Greece) Periklis Amanatidis	2 July 2023
Panachaiki	(Greece) Giorgos Tantaros (caretaker)	End of tenure as caretaker	18 June 2023	Pre-season	(Italy) Stefano Franciosa	7 August 2023
Kallithea	(Greece) Giorgos Simos	End of contract	19 June 2023	Pre-season	(Greece) Alekos Vosniadis	10 July 2023
Diagoras	(Greece) Angelos Digozis	End of contract	19 June 2023	Pre-season	(Greece) Thomas Grafas	1 July 2023
Kalamata	(Greece) Periklis Amanatidis	Sacked	5 November 2023	2nd	(Greece) Makis Chavos	8 November 2023
Kalamata	(Greece) Makis Chavos	Sacked	28 January 2024	5th	(Greece) Apostolos Terzis	29 January 2023
Ilioupoli	(Greece) Soulis Papadopoulos	Sacked	18 February 2024	3rd	(Greece) Nikos Pantelis	19 February 2024
Ionikos	(Greece) Giorgos Simos	Sacked	25 February 2024	4th	(Greece) Dimitris Spanos	29 February 2024

=== League Table ===
Pos	Team	Pld	W	D	L	GF	GA	GD	Pts	Promotion or relegation (Note: Olympiacos B and Panathinaikos B are ineligible for promotion.)
1	Kallithea (Q)	22	14	5	3	31	14	+17	47	Qualification for the Play-off round
2	Chania (Q)	22	13	5	4	39	14	+25	44	Qualification for the Play-off round
3	Kalamata (Q)	22	10	6	6	27	15	+12	36	Qualification for the Play-off round
4	Ionikos (Q)	22	10	6	6	34	23	+11	36	Qualification for the Play-off round
5	Ilioupoli (Q)	22	11	2	9	20	23	−3	35	Qualification for the Play-off round
6	Diagoras (Q)	22	8	3	11	21	30	−9	27	Qualification for the Play-out round
7	Egaleo (Q)	22	7	4	11	15	25	−10	25	Qualification for the Play-out round
8	Olympiacos B (Note: Olympiacos B has a penalty of 10 points deducted from the previous season.) (Q)	22	8	9	5	31	21	+10	23	Qualification for the Play-out round
9	Giouchtas (Q)	22	5	7	10	20	28	−8	22	Qualification for the Play-out round
10	Panathinaikos B (Q)	22	6	3	13	19	36	−17	21	Qualification for the Play-out round
11	Panachaiki (Q)	22	4	9	9	24	32	−8	21	Qualification for the Play-out round
12	Tilikratis (R)	22	5	3	14	17	37	−20	18	Relegation to Gamma Ethniki

Source: sl2.gr
Rules for classification: 1) Points; 2) Head-to-head points; 3) Head-to-head goal difference; 4) Goal difference; 5) Goals scored; 6) Goals against; 7) Play-offs (neutral ground); 8) Draw.
(Note: Criteria 7 is only used if needed to decide champion, teams for relegation).
(Q) Qualified for the phase indicated; (R) Relegated

=== Results ===
Home \ Away	KLT	CHA	DIA	EGA	GIO	ILP	ION	KLM	OLB	PAN	PNB	TIL
Kallithea	—	0–1	1–1	1–0	1–0	2–1	2–1	1–0	3–2	0–0	3–0	3–0
Chania	1–1	—	4–0	2–0	4–1	3–1	1–1	1–1	2–0	4–1	2–0	3–0
Diagoras	1–0	3–1	—	2–1	2–0	0–1	2–1	1–0	0–2	1–2	1–0	0–2
Egaleo	1–1	0–0	4–1	—	1–0	1–0	1–2	0–3	0–0	1–0	2–1	1–0
Giouchtas	1–2	0–0	2–0	2–0	—	0–1	2–2	1–1	2–2	2–1	2–0	1–0
Ilioupoli	1–2	1–0	1–0	2–0	0–0	—	0–3	1–0	0–1	1–0	1–3	1–0
Ionikos	0–1	0–3	1–0	5–1	0–0	4–1	—	3–2	1–0	3–1	2–0	1–0
Kalamata	1–0	0–1	1–2	1–0	3–1	2–0	0–0	—	1–0	1–0	0–0	3–0
Olympiacos B	1–2	3–0	1–0	0–0	3–1	0–0	1–1	0–0	—	2–2	3–1	4–1
Panachaiki	1–1	2–1	1–1	0–1	3–1	1–2	1–1	1–1	1–1	—	0–2	2–1
Panathinaikos B	0–1	0–2	2–2	1–0	2–1	0–2	1–0	1–4	1–3	2–2	—	2–1
Tilikratis	0–3	0–3	1–0	1–0	0–0	1–2	3–2	0–2	2–2	2–2	2–0	—

Source: sl2.gr
Legend: Blue = home team win; Yellow = draw; Red = away team win.
For upcoming matches, an "a" indicates there is an article about the rivalry between the two participants.

=== Play-off round ===
In the play-offs, the first five teams in the first phase's standings will participate, and they will compete twice with the rest, at home and away to decide the South Group's Champion who will also be promoted to next year's Super League 1. They will include 10 matchdays and 8 matches for each team. The teams will enter with half of the points they had won in the first phase.

Pos	Team	Pld	W	D	L	GF	GA	GD	Pts	Relegation
1	Kallithea (C, P)	8	5	2	1	18	5	+13	41	Promotion to Super League 1
2	Chania	8	4	1	3	19	14	+5	35	
3	Ionikos (R)	8	2	5	1	9	6	+3	29	Relegation to Local Championships
4	Ilioupoli	8	3	2	3	11	19	−8	29	
5	Kalamata	8	0	2	6	2	15	−13	20	

Source: sl2.gr
Rules for classification: 1) Points; 2) Head-to-head points; 3) Head-to-head goal difference; 4) Goal difference; 5) Goals scored; 6) Goals against; 7) Play-offs (neutral ground); 8) Draw.
(Note: Criteria 7 is only used if needed to decide champion.)
(C) Champions; (P) Promoted; (R) Relegated

=== Play-off Results ===
Home \ Away	KLT	CHA	ILP	ION	KLM
Athens Kallithea	—	1–1	4–0	1–1	4–1
Chania	2–1	—	6–2	0–1	2–0
Ilioupoli	0–4	4–2	—	0–0	2–1
Ionikos	0–2	5–1	2–2	—	0–0
Kalamata	0–1	0–5	0–1	0–0	—

Source: sl2.gr
Legend: Blue = home team win; Yellow = draw; Red = away team win.
For upcoming matches, an "a" indicates there is an article about the rivalry between the two participants.

=== Play-out round ===
The teams that will take the positions 6th to 11th in the regular season will participate in the play-outs. As in the play-offs, the teams will start with half of the points they collected in the first phase and compete with the rest in double matches home and away (10 matches, 10 matches for each team). The teams that occupy the last three positions in the play-outs will be relegated to next year's Gamma Ethniki.

Pos	Team	Pld	W	D	L	GF	GA	GD	Pts	Relegation
1	Egaleo	10	4	5	1	10	5	+5	30	
2	Panachaiki	10	6	1	3	11	10	+1	30	
3	Diagoras	10	3	6	1	8	6	+2	29	
4	Olympiacos B (R)	10	3	2	5	17	13	+4	23	Relegation to Gamma Ethniki
5	Giouchtas (R)	10	3	1	6	8	15	−7	21	Relegation to Gamma Ethniki
6	Panathinaikos B (R)	10	2	3	5	6	11	−5	20	Relegation to Gamma Ethniki

Source: sl2.gr
Rules for classification: 1) Points; 2) Head-to-head points; 3) Head-to-head goal difference; 4) Goal difference; 5) Goals scored; 6) Goals against; 7) Play-offs (neutral ground); 8) Draw.
(Note: Criteria 7 is only used if needed to decide champion.)
(R) Relegated

=== Play-out Results ===
Home \ Away	EGA	PAN	DIA	OLB	GIO	PNB
Egaleo	—	1–0	1–1	1–1	1–0	0–0
Panachaiki	1–0	—	1–0	1–0	0–1	2–0
Diagoras	1–1	2–2	—	1–0	1–0	0–0
Olympiacos B	1–3	5–0	1–1	—	3–1	0–1
Giouchtas	0–2	1–2	0–0	3–2	—	2–1
Panathinaikos B	0–0	0–2	0–1	1–4	3–0	—

Source: sl2.gr
Legend: Blue = home team win; Yellow = draw; Red = away team win.
For upcoming matches, an "a" indicates there is an article about the rivalry between the two participants.
