= Athanasios Papatolios =

Greek footballer

Thanasis Papatolios
Personal information
- Full name: Athanasios Papatolios
- Date of birth: 14 July 1994 (age 32)
- Place of birth: Katerini, Greece
- Height: 1.84 m (6 ft 0 in)
- Position: Midfielder

Youth career
- Pierikos

Senior career*
Years	Team	Apps	(Gls)
2011–2014	Pierikos	40	(0)
2014–2017	Acharnaikos	71	(4)
2017–2018	OFI	9	(0)
2018–2020	Panachaiki	31	(1)
2020–2023	Kalamata	83	(1)
2023–2024	Diagoras	17	(1)
2024–2025	Panachaiki	1	(0)
2025	Ethnikos Neo Keramidi	8	(0)
2025–2026	Apollon Kalamarias		
2026–	Panachaiki		
- * Club domestic league appearances and goals as of 1 July 2025

Athanasios 'Thanasis' Papatolios (Greek: Αθανάσιος 'Θανάσης' Παπατόλιος; born 14 July 1994) is a Greek professional footballer who plays as a midfielder for Gamma Ethniki club Panachaiki.

== Youth career ==
He started in the youth academies of Pierikos in his hometown, Katerini.

== Career ==
He has also played for OFI, where he won the Football League in 2017-2018, Kalamata, and Diagoras, among others, recording just under 300 professional appearances.

== Career statistics ==
As of match played 1 July 2025

Appearances and goals by club, season and competition
Club	Season	League			National cup		Other		Total	
Club	Season	Division	Apps	Goals	Apps	Goals	Apps	Goals	Apps	Goals
Pierikos	2011–12	Super League Greece 2	0	0	0	0	—		0	0
Pierikos	2012–13	Super League Greece 2	21	0	2	0	—		23	0
Pierikos	2013–14	Super League Greece 2	19	0	3	0	—		19	0
Acharnaikos	2014–15	Super League Greece 2	30	2	3	0	—		32	2
Acharnaikos	2015–16	Super League Greece 2	13	3	1	0	—		14	3
Acharnaikos	2016–17	Super League Greece 2	28	1	2	0	—		30	1
OFI	2017–18	Super League Greece 2	9	0	2	0	—		11	0
Panachaiki	2018–19	Super League Greece 2	16	0	4	0	—		20	0
Panachaiki	2019–20	Super League Greece 2	15	1	2	0	—		17	1
Kalamata	2021–22	Super League Greece 2	30	1	4	0	—		30	1
Kalamata	2022–23	Super League Greece 2	26	0	3	0	—		29	0
Kalamata	2023–24	Super League Greece 2	12	0	0	0	—		12	0
Diagoras	2023–24	Super League Greece 2	17	1	0	0	—		17	1
Panachaiki	2024–25	Super League Greece 2	1	0	0	0	—		1	0
P.S. Ethnikos Neo Keramidi	2024–25	Super League Greece 2	8	0	0	0	—		8	0
Career total			245	7	0	0	0	0	265	7

== Honours ==
OFI

- Football League: 2017–18
