= Dimitrios Mavrias =

Greek footballer

Personal information
- Date of birth: 3 October 1996 (age 30)
- Place of birth: Karditsa, Greece
- Height: 1.76 m (5 ft 9 1/2 in)
- Position: Winger

Team information
- Current team: PAS Pyrgos
- Number: 7

Youth career
- –2013: Glyfada

Senior career*
Years	Team	Apps	(Gls)
2013–2014	Glyfada	5	(0)
2014–2016	Anagennisi Karditsa	55	(4)
2016–2017	Veria	3	(0)
2017–2018	Apollon Larissa	29	(8)
2018–2020	Panachaiki	36	(7)
2020–2021	Doxa Drama	26	(9)
2021–2024	AEL	82	(8)
2024–2025	Ilioupoli	25	(7)
2025–2026	Athens Kallithea	25	(5)
2026–	PAS Pyrgos	4	(0)

International career
2015	Greece U19	3	(0)
- * Club domestic league appearances and goals as of 27 September 2026

Dimitrios Mavrias (Greek: Δημήτριος Μαυριάς; born 3 October 1996) is a Greek professional footballer who plays as a winger or forward for Super League 2 club PAS Pyrgos.

== Career ==
Mavrias started his career in Glyfada. On 30 January 2014, he moved to Anagennisi Karditsa where he signed a two-year contract. On April 12, 2016, Mavrias joined Super League Greece side Veria on a free transfer signing a three-year contract as his current contract was set to expire on 30 June 2016.

Mavrias is also capped with Greece U19 where he debuted on June 12, 2015.
