= Kostoulas =

Kostoulas (Greek: Κωστούλας) is a Greek surname. Notable people with the surname include:

- Athanasios Kostoulas (born 1976), Greek footballer
- Charalampos Kostoulas (born 2007), Greek footballer
- Konstantinos Kostoulas (born 2005), Greek footballer
- Marios Kostoulas (born 1996), Greek footballer
