= Tsirigotis =

Tsirigotis is a surname. Notable people with the surname include:

- Konstantinos Tsirigotis (born 2001), Greek professional footballer
- Periklis Tsirigotis (1860–1924), Greek Impressionist Orientalist painter
- Theodoros Tsirigotis (born 2000), Greek professional footballer
