= Manolis Sbokos =

Greek footballer

Personal information
- Full name: Emmanouil Sbokos
- Date of birth: 19 February 2003 (age 23)
- Place of birth: Heraklion, Crete, Greece
- Position: Centre-back

Team information
- Current team: Panserraikos
- Number: 72

Youth career
- 2017–2021: OFI

Senior career*
Years	Team	Apps	(Gls)
2021–2022	OFI	0	(0)
2021–2022	→ A.E. Kifisia (loan)	8	(0)
2022–2026	A.E. Kifisia	12	(1)
2023	→ PAO Rouf (loan)	11	(0)
2026	→ Ilioupoli (loan)	7	(0)
2026–	Panserraikos	0	(0)

International career^{‡}
2019–2020	Greece U17	4	(0)
2021	Greece U19	2	(0)
- * Club domestic league appearances and goals as of 21 April 2026 ‡ National team caps and goals as of 26 October 2025

Manolis Sbokos (Greek: Μανώλης Σμπώκος; born 19 February 2003) is a Greek professional footballer who plays as a centre-back for Super League 2 club Panserraikos.
