= Ilias Kyritsis =

Greek footballer (born 1997)

Personal information
- Date of birth: 14 October 1997 (age 29)
- Place of birth: Frankfurt, Germany
- Height: 1.85 m (6 ft 1 in)
- Position: Goalkeeper

Team information
- Current team: Apollon Kalamarias
- Number: 97

Youth career
- Atromitos

Senior career*
Years	Team	Apps	(Gls)
2016–2017	Atromitos	0	(0)
2016–2017	→ Agios Ierotheos (loan)	17	(0)
2017–2018	Kifisia	18	(0)
2018	Ionikos	0	(0)
2018–2019	Keratsini	0	(0)
2019	Paniliakos	9	(0)
2019–2020	P.A.E.E.K.	22	(0)
2020–2021	Kavala	14	(0)
2021	Apollon Smyrni	0	(0)
2022	Kavala	24	(0)
2022–2023	Ierapetra	22	(0)
2023–2024	Chania	1	(0)
2024–2026	Egaleo	36	(0)
2026	Ilioupoli	8	(0)
2026–	Apollon Kalamarias	1	(0)
- * Club domestic league appearances and goals as of September 9, 2026

Ilias Kyritsis (Greek: Ηλίας Κυρίτσης; born 14 October 1997) is a Greek professional association football player who plays as a goalkeeper for Super League 2 club Apollon Kalamarias.
