= Sakis Papavasiliou =

Greek footballer and manager

Personal information
- Date of birth: 21 August 1976 (age 50)
- Place of birth: Katerini, Greece
- Height: 1.76 m (5 ft 9 in)
- Position: Midfielder

Senior career*
Years	Team	Apps	(Gls)
–1999	Pierikos		
1999–2000	Ethnikos Katerini		
2000–2001	Panionios		
2001	Niki Volos		
2001	Pierikos		
2002	Kilkisiakos		
2003	AEL		
2003	Panargiakos		
2004	Agrotikos Asteras		
2004–2005	Asteras Syrou		
2005–2007	Pierikos		
2007	Ethnikos Katerini		
2008	Pyrsos Grevena		
2009	Aetos Skydra		
2009–2010	Pyrgetos		
2010–2011	Ethnikos Katerini		

Managerial career
- 2012: Aiginiakos
- 2012–2014: Vataniakos
- 2017: Karaiskakis
- 2016: Nestos Chrysoupoli
- 2016–2017: AO Chania
- 2017: Olympiacos Volos
- 2017–2018: Karaiskakis
- 2018–2019: Ialysos
- 2019–2021: Pierikos
- 2021: Kavala
- 2021–2022: Kozani
- 2022: Episkopi
- 2023: Pierikos
- 2024: Ilioupoli
- 2024–2025: Makedonikos
- 2025–2026: Panargiakos
- 2026: Nestos Chrysoupoli
- * Club domestic league appearances and goals

Sakis Papavasiliou (Greek: Σάκης Παπαβασιλείου; born 21 August 1976) is a Greek professional football manager and former player.
