= Maleace Asamoah =

English footballer (born 2002)

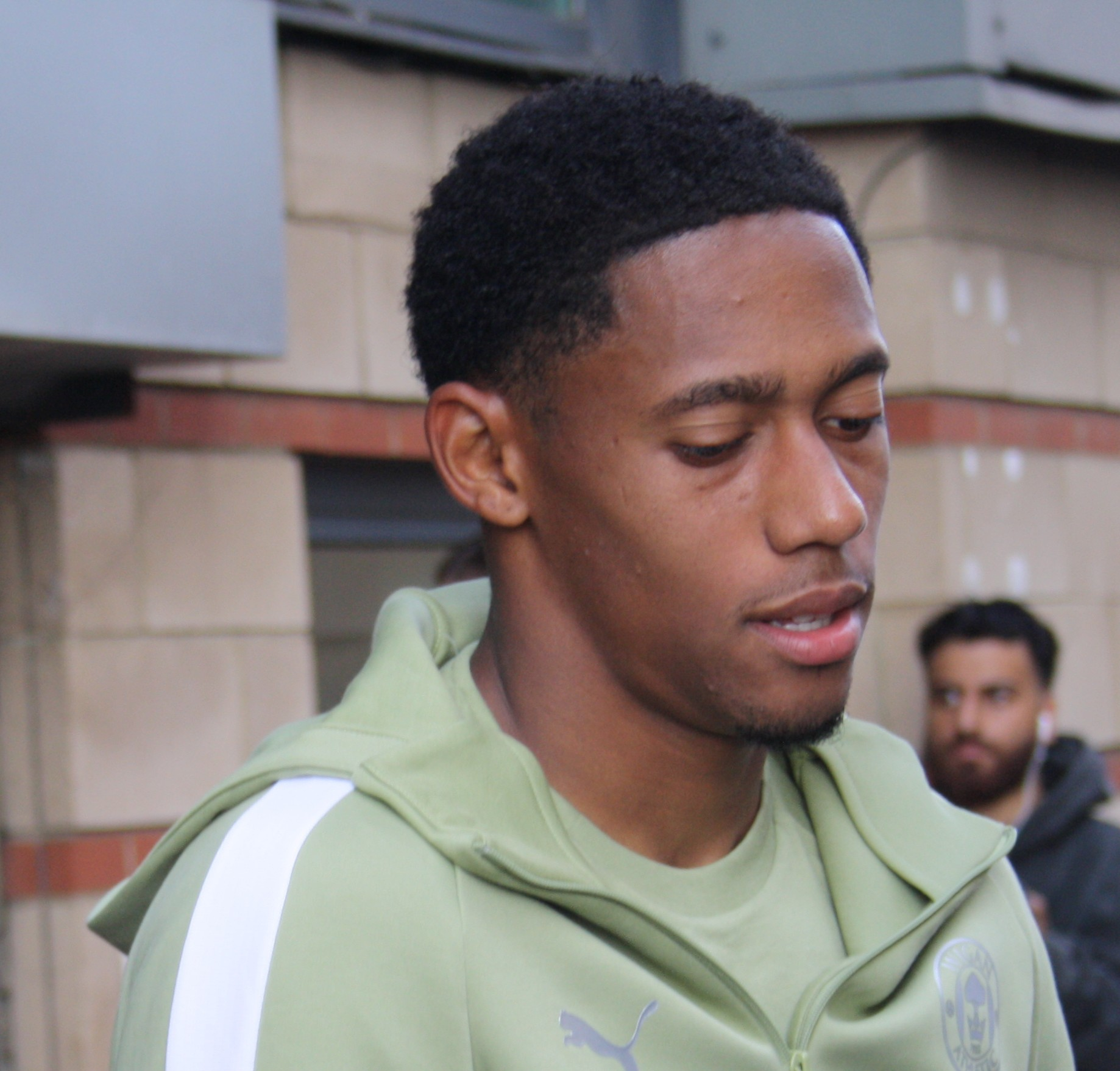
- Asamoah in a Wigan Athletic tracksuit (2025)

Personal information
- Full name: Maleace Kobby Afriyie Asamoah
- Date of birth: 15 November 2002 (age 24)
- Place of birth: Oxford, England
- Height: 1.83 m (6 ft 0 in)
- Positions: Forward; winger

Team information
- Current team: Port Vale (on loan from Wigan Athletic)
- Number: 27

Youth career
- Reading
- Tottenham Hotspur

Senior career*
Years	Team	Apps	(Gls)
2020–2021	Cheshunt	0	(0)
2021–2023	Kalamata	1	(0)
2022	→ Olympiacos Volos (loan)	3	(0)
2023	New Salamis	6	(2)
2023–2024	Fleetwood Town	8	(0)
2024	→ Waterford (loan)	17	(6)
2024–	Wigan Athletic	36	(2)
2026	→ Shamrock Rovers (loan)	10	(1)
2026–	→ Port Vale (loan)	5	(0)
- * Club domestic league appearances and goals as of 10:24, 22 November 2026 (UTC)

Maleace Kobby Afriyie Asamoah (born 15 November 2002) is an English professional footballer who plays as a forward for EFL League Two club Port Vale, on loan from EFL League One club Wigan Athletic. His father, Derek, is a former Ghana international footballer.

Asamoah spent his youth with Reading and Tottenham Hotspur before making his senior debut with non-League side Cheshunt in 2020. He then had spells in Greece with Kalamata and Olympiacos Volos, returning to England to play alongside his father at New Salamis in February 2023. He was signed by League One club Fleetwood Town in July 2023 and impressed on loan at Irish club Waterford the following year. He was sold to Wigan Athletic in August 2024. In 2026 he was loaned to Shamrock Rovers and Port Vale.

== Club career ==
=== Early career ===
Growing up, Asamoah spent time in the Reading academy. In 2020, he joined Isthmian League Premier Division side Cheshunt playing in one FA Trophy match away to Lowestoft Town in a 3–0 win in which he played alongside his father, Derek. In August 2021, he joined Super League Greece 2 side Kalamata. On 7 January 2022, he joined Olympiacos Volos on loan until the end of the season. On 23 January, Asamoah made his professional league debut as a substitute for Olympiacos Volos in a 2–1 defeat to Larissa. In February 2023, he returned to England playing alongside his father for Isthmian League Division One North side New Salamis.

=== Fleetwood Town ===
On 1 July 2023, Asamoah joined League One club Fleetwood Town on a one-year contract with an option of an additional year, being assigned to Matt Lawlor's development squad. However he was immediately named in the first-team matchday squad at Highbury Stadium as Fleetwood manager Scott Brown handed Asamoah his senior debut in a 1–1 draw at Carlisle United, one of his father's former clubs.

On 9 February 2024, Asamoah joined Waterford, Fleetwood's sister-club in the League of Ireland Premier Division, on loan; he was described by head coach Keith Long as "someone who can get the fans excited". On 16 February, he scored on his debut for the club in a 1–1 draw with Shelbourne, being named on the League of Ireland Premier Division Team of the Week. On 10 May, he scored a hat-trick in a 4–1 win over Dundalk at the Regional Sports Centre, the club's first top-flight hat-trick in 21 years. He scored six goals in 17 appearances for Waterford and featured nine times for Fleetwood.

=== Wigan Athletic ===
On 30 August 2024, Asamoah joined League One club Wigan Athletic for an undisclosed fee, signing a three-year deal. He said it was a "no-brainer" to join Wigan as manager Shaun Maloney was a former winger, whilst sporting director Gregor Rioch stated that "we believe he will become a key player for us". Speaking in February 2025, Maloney said that injury to Will Goodwin allowed Asamoah to claim one of the two striker spots in the first XI. On 29 March, Asamoah scored the equalising goal against Barnsley to secure Ryan Lowe his first point as the new Wigan manager.

He was sent off in a 4–2 defeat at Stockport County on 21 February 2026, in what was Gary Caldwell's second game as Wigan manager. He subsequently told Caldwell that he wanted to leave the Brick Community Stadium and he was transfer-listed. On 23 February, Asamoah joined League of Ireland Premier Division club Shamrock Rovers on loan until the end of the 2026 season. Manager Stephen Bradley said they had tried to sign him ever since his spell with Waterford. He was largely restricted to the bench during his time at Tallaght and the loan was ended on 1 September with a record of one goal in 13 appearances. Later that day, he joined League Two club Port Vale on loan until the end of the 2026–27 season. He scored in the EFL Trophy, but fell out of the first-team picture after manager Jon Brady started to play without wingers.

== Style of play ==
Asamoah has been described by both Wigan Athletic manager Shaun Maloney and Port Vale manager Jon Brady as a quick forward, able to play both as a winger and as a striker. Speaking of his own qualities, Asamoah said he had "speed... [is] tricky... and I feel like I like to have a good end product... [and is] someone who likes to excite the fans".

== Personal life ==
Asamoah is the son of former Ghana international, Derek, and the pair played together in a match for Cheshunt. He claimed that at New Salamis, they became the first father and son to score in the same game and assist each other. His younger brother, Zayshaun, also played non-League football.

== Career statistics ==
As of match played 21 November 2026

Appearances and goals by club, season and competition
Club	Season	League			National Cup (Note: Includes Greek Football Cup, FA Cup, FAI Cup)		League Cup (Note: Includes EFL Cup)		Other		Total	
Club	Season	Division	Apps	Goals	Apps	Goals	Apps	Goals	Apps	Goals	Apps	Goals
Cheshunt	2020–21	IL Premier Division	0	0	0	0	—		1 (Note: Appearances in FA Trophy)	0	1	0
Kalamata	2021–22	Super League Greece 2	0	0	1	0	—		—		1	0
Kalamata	2022–23	Super League Greece 2	1	0	0	0	—		—		1	0
Kalamata	Total		1	0	1	0	—		—		2	0
Olympiacos Volos (loan)	2021–22	Super League Greece 2	3	0	—		—		—		3	0
New Salamis	2022–23	IL Division One North	6	2	—		—		—		6	2
Fleetwood Town	2023–24	EFL League One	8	0	0	0	1	0	0	0	9	0
Fleetwood Town	2024–25	EFL League Two	0	0	—		0	0	—		0	0
Fleetwood Town	Total		8	0	0	0	1	0	0	0	9	0
Waterford (loan)	2024	LOI Premier Division	17	6	0	0	—		0	0	17	6
Wigan Athletic	2024–25	EFL League One	16	1	2	0	—		3 (Note: Appearances in EFL Trophy)	0	21	1
Wigan Athletic	2025–26	EFL League One	20	1	1	0	3	0	2	1	26	2
Wigan Athletic	2026–27	EFL League One	0	0	0	0	0	0	0	0	0	0
Wigan Athletic	Total		36	2	3	0	3	0	5	1	47	3
Shamrock Rovers (loan)	2026	LOI Premier Division	10	1	1	0	—		3 (Note: 1 appearance in UEFA Champions League; 1 appearance in UEFA Europa League; 1 appearance & 1 goal in Leinster Senior Cup)	1	14	2
Port Vale (loan)	2026–27	EFL League Two	5	0	0	0	—		3	2	8	2
Career total			86	11	5	0	4	0	12	4	107	15
