= Vangelis Keramidas =

Greek association footballer

Personal information
- Full name: Evangelos Keramidas
- Date of birth: 12 September 2002 (age 24)
- Place of birth: Athens, Greece
- Height: 1.82 m (6 ft 0 in)
- Position: Left-back

Team information
- Current team: Loutraki

Youth career
- 2008–2012: AE Moschato
- 2012–2021: Olympiacos

Senior career*
Years	Team	Apps	(Gls)
2021–2024	Olympiacos B	38	(1)
2025–2026	Ilioupoli	29	(0)
2026–	Loutraki		
- * Club domestic league appearances and goals as of 25 April 2026

Vangelis Keramidas (Greek: Βαγγέλης Κεραμίδας; born 12 September 2002) is a Greek professional footballer who plays as a left-back for Gamma Ethniki club Loutraki.
