= Michalis Tsoumanis =

Greek footballer

Personal information
- Full name: Michail Tsoumanis
- Date of birth: 9 October 2002 (age 24)
- Place of birth: Larissa, Greece
- Height: 1.90 m (6 ft 3 in)
- Position: Striker

Team information
- Current team: Anagennisi Karditsa
- Number: 88

Youth career
- 2017–2020: AEL

Senior career*
Years	Team	Apps	(Gls)
2020–2021	AO Sellana	0	(0)
2021–2023	AEL	20	(2)
2023	→ Iraklis Larissa (loan)	2	(0)
2023–2024	Iraklis	9	(0)
2024	AEL	3	(0)
2024	Ethnikos Neo Keramidi	2	(0)
2025	Chalkanoras Idaliou	12	(3)
2025–2026	Ilioupoli	18	(3)
2026–	Anagennisi Karditsa	0	(0)
- * Club domestic league appearances and goals as of 21 April 2026

Michalis Tsoumanis (Greek: Μιχάλης Τσουμάνης; born 9 October 2002) is a Greek professional footballer who currently plays as a forward for Super League 2 club Anagennisi Karditsa.

== Career ==
Tsoumanis was born in Larissa. He started his career in the youth squad of AEL where he played in the Greek Super League Youth U-19 Championship. In October 2020, he moved to AO Sellana, a 3rd League club. On 9 July 2021, Tsoumanis joined AEL on a free transfer signing a three-year contract. He scored his first professional goal against Xanthi F.C. on his debut, on 29 December 2021, having played for only three minutes as a substitute.
