= Dimitrios Politis =

Greek footballer

Personal information
- Date of birth: 8 March 1995 (age 31)
- Place of birth: Athens, Greece
- Height: 1.91 m (6 ft 3 in)
- Position: Goalkeeper

Team information
- Current team: Ethnikos Piraeus

Youth career
- Panionios

Senior career*
Years	Team	Apps	(Gls)
2014–2015	Panionios	0	(0)
2014–2015	→ Zakynthos (loan)	10	(0)
2015–2016	Zakynthos	9	(0)
2016–2017	Kissamikos	1	(0)
2017–2018	Panegialios	5	(0)
2018	Panserraikos	9	(0)
2018–2020	Apollon Pontus	20	(0)
2020	Veria	2	(0)
2020–2021	Kavala	16	(0)
2021–2022	Apollon Pontus	20	(0)
2022	Anagennisi Karditsa	0	(0)
2022–2025	Ilioupoli	24	(0)
2026	Ilioupoli	5	(0)
2026–	Ethnikos Piraeus		
- * Club domestic league appearances and goals as of 25 April 2026

Dimitrios Politis (Greek: Δημήτριος Πολίτης; born 8 March 1995) is a Greek professional footballer who plays as a goalkeeper for Gamma Ethniki club Ethnikos Piraeus.
