= Ilias Evangelou =

Greek footballer

Personal information
- Date of birth: 18 May 1997 (age 29)
- Place of birth: Athens, Greece
- Height: 1.83 m (6 ft 0 in)
- Position: Centre-back

Team information
- Current team: PAS Pyrgos
- Number: 15

Youth career
- –2014: Kallithea

Senior career*
Years	Team	Apps	(Gls)
2015–2016	Kallithea	3	(0)
2016–2017	Asteras Tripolis	3	(0)
2017	→ Sparti (loan)	0	(0)
2018	→ Panarkadikos (loan)	16	(3)
2018	Kallithea	12	(0)
2019	Nafpaktiakos	8	(1)
2019–2020	Ethnikos Piraeus	21	(2)
2020	Nafpaktiakos	2	(0)
2021	Kalamata	4	(0)
2021–2023	Athens Kallithea	39	(1)
2023–2026	Egaleo	66	(3)
2026–	PAS Pyrgos	1	(0)

International career
2015	Greece U18	1	(0)
2017	Greece U21	2	(0)
- * Club domestic league appearances and goals as of 21 September 2026

Ilias Evangelou (Greek: Ηλίας Ευαγγέλου; born 18 May 1997) is a Greek professional footballer who plays as a centre-back for Super League 2 club PAS Pyrgos.

== Career ==
Born and raised in Kallithea, Evaggelou came through the academy at Athens Kallithea FC and made his first team debut at age 18 in May 2016, which prompted a move to Super League 1 side Asteras Tripolis, where he would make three appearances in the top flight the following season and earn two caps with the Greece under-21 national team.

After two loans spells from Tripoli, Evaggelou returned to Kallithea in 2018/19, and he would eventually come back for a third spell with the club in September 2021.
