= Felype Hebert =

Brazilian footballer

Personal information
- Full name: Felype Hebert Dias Rodrigues
- Date of birth: 27 June 1997 (age 29)
- Place of birth: Combinado, Brazil
- Height: 1.80 m (5 ft 11 in)
- Position: Forward

Youth career
- 2012–2016: São Paulo
- 2016–2017: Vasco da Gama

Senior career*
Years	Team	Apps	(Gls)
2017	Vila Nova	0	(0)
2017–2018	Paços de Ferreira	21	(2)
2018	Operário-MT	8	(4)
2019	Boa Esporte	0	(0)
2019–2020	Ferroviária	25	(8)
2019	→ Marcílio Dias (loan)	4	(0)
2020–2023	Kalamata	26	(6)
2022–2023	→ Ilioupolis (loan)	22	(2)
2024	Bandeirante	14	(3)
2024	Trindade	8	(0)
2025–	Gurupi	3	(1)
- * Club domestic league appearances and goals as of 26 February 2025

Felype Hebert Dias Rodrigues (born 27 June 1997), simply known as Felype Hebert or Felype, is a Brazilian professional footballer who plays as a forward.

== Career ==
Revealed in the youth sectors of São Paulo FC, he was one of the club's highlights in the 2015 edition of Copa São Paulo de Futebol Jr. He also had a spell at Vasco da Gama until making his professional debut at Vila Nova FC. In 2019 he played in Copa Paulista for Ferroviária, being the team's main goal scorer.

On 7 August 2020, he signed a contract with Kalamata FC in Greece, the club that holds his rights until 2023. In 2024 he returned to Brazil and currently plays for Trindade AC. For 2025 season, Felype was announced as reinforcement for Gurupi.

== Honours ==
Kalamata

- Third Division: 2020–21
