= Georgios Tsilingiris =

Greek footballer

Personal information
- Date of birth: 19 September 2001 (age 25)
- Place of birth: Xanthi, Greece
- Height: 1.71 m (5 ft 7 in)
- Position: Midfielder

Team information
- Current team: Doxa Katokopias
- Number: 10

Youth career
- Xanthi

Senior career*
Years	Team	Apps	(Gls)
2020–2022	Xanthi	17	(0)
2021	→ Ierapetra (loan)	8	(1)
2022–2024	Makedonikos	43	(3)
2024–2025	Niki Volos	17	(1)
2025–2026	Egaleo	13	(1)
2026	Ilioupoli	10	(0)
2026–	Doxa Katokopias	0	(0)
- * Club domestic league appearances and goals as of 25 April 2026

Georgios Tsilingiris (Greek: Γεώργιος Τσιλιγγίρης; born 19 September 2001) is a Greek professional footballer who plays as a midfielder for Cypriot Second Division club Doxa Katokopias.
