= Doxa Katokopias FC =

Cypriot football club

Doxa Katokopias
- Full name: Doxa Katokopias FC
- Short name: DXK
- Founded: 1954; 72 years ago
- Ground: Katokopia Stadium
- Capacity: 3,500
- Chairman: Costas Christodoulou Karavidas
- Manager: Makis Sergides
- League: Second Division
- 2025–26: Second Division, 5th of 16
- Website: doxafc.com.cy
| Home colours | Away colours |

Doxa Katokopias FC (Greek: Δόξα Κατωκοπιάς) is a Cypriot professional football club from Katokopia in the Nicosia District.

== History ==
Doxa (which translates as Glory) was promoted to First Division in 1998 for first time in their history, but after finishing 13th in the table (out of 14 teams) they were relegated. The following season, after finishing third in the Second division, they were promoted again in 2000 and this time, with the experience of their first participation, they achieved great success by managing to finish 11th and to remain in the First Division. They were relegated again in 2002 to become Second Division runners-up the following year. They competed again in the first division in the 2003–04 season where they finished last with only 1 win from 26 games and were thus automatically relegated. They were again promoted to the first division in 2007 and after 4 consecutive seasons in the First Division, they have been relegated back to the Second Division in 2011. In 2012 they were promoted again to the First Division after finishing 2nd in the Second Division. In their last five consecutive participations in First Division, a record for the club, they used as home ground the Makario Stadium.

== Players ==
As of 16 September 2026

Note: Flags indicate national team as defined under FIFA eligibility rules; some limited exceptions apply. Players may hold more than one non-FIFA nationality.

| No. | Pos. | Nation | Player |
|---|---|---|---|
| 1 | GK | ISR | Yigal Becker (on loan from APOEL) |
| 3 | DF | CYP | Anninos Kyratzis |
| 4 | MF | GRE | Konstantinos Myrtollari |
| 5 | DF | CYP | Charalampos Erotokritou |
| 6 | MF | CYP | Sotiris Finiris |
| 7 | FW | SRB | Nikola Trujić |
| 9 | FW | GRE | Georgios Kosteas |
| 10 | MF | GRE | Georgios Tsilingiris |
| 11 | FW | GER | Benjamin Heymann |
| 14 | FW | GRE | Ilias Batzonis |
| 17 | MF | CYP | Panagiotis Markou |
| 19 | FW | GAB | Jalex Jose |
| 20 | MF | CYP | Christos Mettis |
| 21 | DF | CYP | Giorgos Theodosiou |

| No. | Pos. | Nation | Player |
|---|---|---|---|
| 23 | DF | CYP | Adonis Venizelos |
| 24 | GK | CYP | Konstantinos Christodoulou |
| 25 | MF | CYP | Giannis Stouppis |
| 29 | MF | CYP | Nikolas Irakleous |
| 30 | MF | CYP | Nikolas Koullapis |
| 32 | DF | CYP | Panagiotis Kylilis |
| 34 | DF | CYP | Loukas Kalogirou |
| 41 | MF | CYP | Petros Fokas |
| 77 | DF | GRE | Marios Chrysovergis |
| 99 | GK | CYP | Gavriil Sakka |
| — | MF | BEN | Edgar Nanque |
| — | MF | CYP | Loizos Konstantinou |
| — | DF | SYR | Zane Abbara |

=== Out on loan ===
Note: Flags indicate national team as defined under FIFA eligibility rules; some limited exceptions apply. Players may hold more than one non-FIFA nationality.

| No. | Pos. | Nation | Player |

== Hat-tricks for club ==
- (Romania) Paul Batin (31.03.2019 Emris – Doxa 0:4) First division match
- (Ukraine) Yevhen Pavlov (22.03.2019 Olympiakos Nicosia – Doxa 2:3) Friendly match
- (Finland) Berat Sadik (23.09.2018 APOEL – Doxa 2:5) First division match
- (Finland) Berat Sadik (05.05.2018 Alki Oroklini – Doxa 1:3) First division First Division relegation match

== Notable former players ==
See also Doxa Katokopias FC players for a complete list

== Managers ==
- (Cyprus) Pambos Christodoulou (1 July 2006 – 30 June 2010)
- (Cyprus) Nikodimos Papavasiliou (1 July 2010 – 13 January 2011)
- (Cyprus) Nikos Andronikou (21 Jan 2011 – 19 March 2011)
- (Cyprus) Marios Constantinou (21 March 2011 – 1 November 2012)
- (Cyprus) Loukas Hadjiloukas (1 Nov 2012 – 19 January 2014)
- (Cyprus) Sofoklis Sofokleous (21 Jan 2014 – 9 April 2014)
- (Cyprus) Demetris Ioannou (9 April 2014 – 1 September 2014)
- (Serbia) Slobodan Krčmarević (8 September 2014 – 15 February 2015)
- (Cyprus) Nicos Andreou (4 March 2015 – 24 May 2015)
- (Cyprus) Loukas Hadjiloukas (3 June 2015 – 28 November 2016)
- (Spain) Carlos Corberán (29 Nov 2016– 24 January 2017)
- (Greece) Savvas Poursaitidis (25 Jan 2017– 2017)
