= PAS Pyrgos F.C. =

Association football club in Greece

PAS Pyrgos
- Full name: Πανηλειακός Αθλητικός Σύλλογος Πύργος; Paniliakos Athletic Club Pyrgos
- Founded: 20 July 2025; 16 months ago
- Ground: Pyrgos Stadium
- Capacity: 6,750
- Owner: Aris Oikonomou
- Chairman: Aris Oikonomou
- Manager: Dimitrios Spanos
- League: Super League Greece 2
- 2025–26: Gamma Ethniki (Group 4), 1st (Promoted)
Home colours	Away colours

PAS Pyrgos Football Club (Greek: Πανηλειακός Αθλητικός Σύλλογος Πύργος, lit. 'Paniliakos Athletic Club Pyrgos') is a Greek football club based in Pyrgos. The club operates men's and women's football departments, as well as a futsal section.

In 2025, Thyella Katarrachiou Pyrgos merged with PAS Pyrgos 2023 and was renamed PAS Pyrgos 1968, adopting red and white as its official colors and the torch—the historic emblem of Paniliakos—as its crest. Since the 2026–27 season, the men's football section competes in Super League 2, the second tier of the Greek football league system, under the corporate name PAS Pyrgos 1968 S.A. and the trading name Pyrgos AFC. The club plays its home matches at the Pyrgos Stadium, which has a capacity of 6,750.

== History ==
=== AO Thyella Katarrachiou Pyrgos (1968–2025) ===
In the 1977–78 season, Thyella won the Elis Football Clubs Association championship and gained promotion to the National Amateur Category, which served as the third tier of Greek football. The following season (1978–79), competing against historic clubs such as Paniliakos, Kalamata, Panegialios, Kerkyra, and Sparta, Thyella finished 18th in the league with 18 points and was relegated.

In the 2024–25 season, the club won the Elis Football Clubs Association championship once again and earned promotion to the national divisions through the Greek FCA Winners' Championship.

=== PAS Pyrgos 2023 (2023–2025) ===
The club was founded on 31 July 2023 by the organized supporters of Paniliakos, known as "Red Boys", under the name PAS Pyrgos 2023. It was created as a grassroots initiative by the fans due to the administrative and financial uncertainty surrounding the historic Paniliakos. The club's official colors were red and white.

The team started in the Third Division of the Elis Football Clubs Association during the 2023–24 season and continued its run in the 2024–25 season, securing back-to-back promotions.

=== PAS Pyrgos (2025–present) ===
In July 2025, following extensive consultations, the management of Thyella Pyrgos—having won the Elis Football Clubs Association championship—in cooperation with the board of "PAS Pyrgos 2023", agreed to rename Thyella to PAS Pyrgos 1968 (officially Podosfairikos Athlitikos Syllogos Pyrgos 1968), adopting the trading name Pyrgos AFC.

Initially, the new club was intended to be named "APS Pyrgos 1968". However, on 6 July 2025, PAS Pyrgos announced details regarding the agreement reached with the investors of Pyrgos FC Thyella since Monday 2 June, specifying the following:

- Official registered name: "PAS Pyrgos 1968" (commercial name: "Pyrgos AFC").
- Club colors: red and white.
- Crest featuring the torch emblem, based on that of Paniliakos.
- A binding agreement to adopt the name "Paniliakos" as soon as it becomes legally and financially feasible.

On 11 July 2025, the registration deadline for the Gamma Ethniki, the newly formed club officially entered the championship. The change of name, colors, and crest was approved by the Hellenic Football Federation on 25 August 2025. Unofficially, the club is widely referred to as Paniliakos (which was officially dissolved in 2024) and enjoys the support of Paniliakos fans in its home matches, with a permanent renaming expected following the conclusion of the 2025–26 season.

The team completed 16 transfers during the summer of 2025 and secured first place in its group in the 2025–26 Gamma Ethniki. Consequently, the club qualified for the promotion play-offs, where it earned a second consecutive promotion, advancing to Super League 2.

On 4 November 2026, the historic and symbolic name "Paniliakos" was officially incorporated into the club's acronym, which became "Paniliakos Athletic Club Pyrgos" (PAS Pyrgos) following a unanimous decision welcomed with enthusiasm by hundreds of supporters.

== Crest and colours ==
=== Colours ===
The official club colours of PAS Pyrgos 1968 are red and white, directly adopted from the historical identity of Paniliakos.

=== Crest ===
The club's crest features a traditional shield with a white background and a red diagonal sash. At its center stands a white medieval tower topped with a burning red torch, combining the historical symbol of the city of Pyrgos (meaning "tower" in Greek) with the iconic torch emblem of Paniliakos. The top header of the shield displays the trading name Pyrgos AFC, while the foundation year 1968 is depicted on the lower right side.

== Supporters ==
The club is supported by fans of Paniliakos, as well as general football supporters from the city of Pyrgos and the broader region of Elis.

=== Fan clubs ===
- Red Boys - Angels Club (est. 1996): The primary supporters' club of Paniliakos, which now supports PAS Pyrgos 1968 and refers to the team as Paniliakos during home matches.

== Players ==
=== Current squad ===
As of 21 September 2026

Note: Flags indicate national team as defined under FIFA eligibility rules; some limited exceptions apply. Players may hold more than one non-FIFA nationality.

No.	Pos.	Nation	Player
1	GK	GRE	Makis Giannikoglou
2	DF	GRE	Alexandros Kardaris
3	DF	GRE	Georgios Saramantas (captain)
4	DF	GRE	Konstantinos Dimitriou
6	MF	GRE	Kaloudis Lemonis
7	MF	GRE	Dimitrios Mavrias
8	MF	GRE	Giannis Ferekidis
9	FW	GRE	Konstantinos Doumtsios
10	MF	JOR	Angelos Chanti
11	MF	GRE	Odysseas Lazaris
12	MF	ZIM	Tirivashe Chirikwawo
14	MF	GRE	Manolis Koulousias
15	DF	GRE	Ilias Evangelou
16	DF	GRE	Chrysovalantis Manos
17	MF	CIV	Manssour Fofana

No.	Pos.	Nation	Player
18	MF	GRE	Alexandros Dani
19	MF	ARG	Gonzalo Muscia
20	MF	GRE	Giannis Sardelis
21	GK	GRE	Adam Tsekouras
22	DF	GRE	Jon Prifti
23	DF	ARG	Rodrigo Erramuspe
24	MF	GRE	Giannis Daskalopoulos
26	MF	GRE	Adriano Skenderaj
29	MF	ARG	Nicolás Czornomaz
31	DF	GRE	Sotirios Markopoulos
34	MF	ALB	Aidon Shehu (on loan from Panathinaikos)
47	FW	GRE	Georgios Nalitzis
50	GK	GRE	Georgios Birbilis
72	MF	GRE	Aristidis Kokkoris
77	MF	GRE	Frixos Grivas

== Honours ==
PAS Pyrgos

- Gamma Ethniki
  - Winners (1): 2025–26

Thyella Katarrachiou Pyrgos

- Elis FCA Championship
  - Winners (2): 1977–78, 2024–25
- Elis FCA Cup
  - Winners (1): 2024–25
- Elis FCA A2 Division
  - Winners (1): 2015–16
- Elis FCA B Division
  - Winners (1): 2000–01

== Personnel ==
=== Board of directors ===
Position	Name
President	Aris Oikonomou
Vice-President	Grigoris Dedes
Members	Vasilis Theodorakopoulos
Members	Panagiotis Babatsikos
Members	Andreas Nikolakopoulos
