= Marios Kostoulas =

Greek footballer

Personal information
- Date of birth: 12 March 1996 (age 30)
- Place of birth: Larissa, Greece
- Height: 1.84 m (6 ft 0 in)
- Position: Defensive midfielder

Team information
- Current team: Makedonikos

Youth career
- Atromitos

Senior career*
Years	Team	Apps	(Gls)
2016–2019	Atromitos	0	(0)
2016–2017	→ Agios Ierotheos (loan)		
2017	→ Ionikos (loan)		
2018–2019	→ Iraklis (loan)	14	(0)
2019–2020	Apollon Larissa	2	(0)
2020–2021	Diagoras	17	(0)
2021–2023	Iraklis	48	(2)
2023–2024	Kalamata	19	(1)
2024	Panachaiki	3	(0)
2025	Panargiakos	5	(0)
2025–2026	Ilioupoli	20	(1)
2026–	Makedonikos		
- * Club domestic league appearances and goals as of 25 April 2026

Marios Kostoulas (Greek: Μάριος Κωστούλας; born 12 March 1996) is a Greek professional footballer who plays as a defensive midfielder for Gamma Ethniki club Makedonikos.
