= Nikos Theodosiadis =

Greek footballer and manager (born 1973)

Personal information
- Full name: Nikolaos Theodosiadis
- Date of birth: 14 January 1973 (age 53)
- Place of birth: Katerini, Greece
- Position: Defender

Team information
- Current team: Rigas Feraios Velestino (manager)

Senior career*
Years	Team	Apps	(Gls)
1993	Pierikos		

Managerial career
- 2012: Pierikos (caretaker)
- 2013: Iraklis (caretaker)
- 2013–2014: Pierikos
- 2015–2016: Achilleas Neokesaria
- 2016–2017: Karaiskakis
- 2017: Pierikos
- 2017–2018: Apollon Larissa
- 2018: Kronos Argyrades
- 2018–2019: Pierikos
- 2019–2020: Kerkyra
- 2020–2021: Koufalia
- 2021–2022: Pierikos
- 2022–2023: GAS Svoronos
- 2023–2024: Pierikos
- 2024–2025: Ethnikos Neo Keramidi
- 2025: Olympiacos Volos
- 2025: Trikala
- 2026–: Rigas Feraios Velestino
- * Club domestic league appearances and goals

Nikos Theodosiadis (Greek: Νίκος Θεοδοσιάδης; born 14 January 1973) is a Greek professional football manager and former player.
