= Georgios Kosteas =

Greek footballer

Personal information
- Date of birth: 16 April 2003 (age 23)
- Place of birth: Kalamata, Greece
- Height: 1.79 m (5 ft 10 in)
- Position: Forward

Team information
- Current team: Doxa Katokopias
- Number: 9

Youth career
- 2019–2022: Asteras Tripolis

Senior career*
Years	Team	Apps	(Gls)
2022–2025	Asteras Tripolis	12	(1)
2024–2025	Asteras Tripolis B	22	(1)
2025–2026	Egaleo	28	(4)
2026–	Doxa Katokopias	0	(0)
- * Club domestic league appearances and goals as of 26 April 2026

Georgios Kosteas (Greek: Γεώργιος Κωστέας; born 16 April 2003) is a Greek professional footballer who plays as a forward for Cypriot Second Division club Doxa Katokopias.

== Career ==
=== Asteras Tripolis ===
On 13 May 2023, in the last matchday of the season, Kosteas scored his first goal for the club in a 1–1 home draw against Atromitos.

== Career statistics ==
As of 14 May 2023

Club statistics
Club	Season	League			Cup		Continental		Other		Total	
Club	Season	Division	Apps	Goals	Apps	Goals	Apps	Goals	Apps	Goals	Apps	Goals
Asteras Tripolis	2022–23	Super League Greece	11	1	1	0	—		—		12	1
Career total			11	1	1	0	0	0	0	0	12	1
