= Frixos Grivas =

Greek footballer

Personal information
- Date of birth: 23 September 2000 (age 26)
- Place of birth: Livadeia, Greece
- Height: 1.78 m (5 ft 10 in)
- Positions: Attacking midfielder; winger

Team information
- Current team: PAS Pyrgos
- Number: 77

Youth career
- 2009–2014: Olympiacos
- 2014–2019: Panionios

Senior career*
Years	Team	Apps	(Gls)
2019–2020	Panionios	11	(0)
2020–2024	OFI	33	(0)
2022	→ Kalamata (loan)	20	(4)
2023–2024	→ Kalamata (loan)	21	(1)
2024–2025	Kalamata	21	(3)
2025–2026	Athens Kallithea	9	(0)
2026–	PAS Pyrgos	3	(0)

International career^{‡}
2021–2022	Greece U21	2	(0)
- * Club domestic league appearances and goals as of 21 September 2026 ‡ National team caps and goals as of 8 October 2021

Frixos Grivas (Greek: Φροίξος Γρίβας; born 23 September 2000) is a Greek professional footballer who plays as an attacking midfielder for Super League 2 club PAS Pyrgos.

== Career ==
On 3 August 2020, Grivas signed a four-year contract with OFI.

== Career statistics ==
=== Club ===
As of 28 May 2021

Club	Season	League			Cup		Continental		Other		Total	
Club	Season	Division	Apps	Goals	Apps	Goals	Apps	Goals	Apps	Goals	Apps	Goals
Panionios	2019–20	Superleague Greece	11	0	3	0	—		—		14	0
OFI	2020–21	Superleague Greece	23	0	2	0	0	0	—		25	0
Career total			34	0	5	0	0	0	0	0	39	0
