= Kaloudis Lemonis =

Greek footballer

Personal information
- Date of birth: 11 November 1995 (age 31)
- Place of birth: Nea Potidea, Chalkidiki, Greece
- Height: 1.74 m (5 ft 9 in)
- Position: Defensive midfielder

Team information
- Current team: PAS Pyrgos
- Number: 6

Youth career
- 2009–2013: Aris

Senior career*
Years	Team	Apps	(Gls)
2013–2015	Aris	10	(0)
2015–2017	APE Langada	40	(1)
2017–2018	AO Chania−Kissamikos	27	(3)
2018–2019	Telstar	0	(0)
2019	Doxa Drama	13	(1)
2019–2020	Triglia	21	(1)
2020–2022	Ierapetra	52	(3)
2022–2025	Chania	75	(6)
2025–2026	Kalamata	3	(0)
2026	Athens Kallithea	4	(0)
2026–	PAS Pyrgos	3	(0)
- * Club domestic league appearances and goals as of 21 September 2026

Kaloudis Lemonis (Greek: Καλούδης Λεμονής; born 11 November 1995) is a Greek professional footballer who plays as a defensive midfielder for Super League 2 club PAS Pyrgos.
