= Timotheos Tselepidis =

Greek footballer

Timos Tselepidis
Personal information
- Full name: Timotheos Tselepidis
- Date of birth: 2 February 1996 (age 30)
- Place of birth: Thessaloniki, Greece
- Height: 1.84 m (6 ft 1/2 in)
- Position: Centre-back

Team information
- Current team: AEL
- Number: 5

Youth career
- –2015: PAOK

Senior career*
Years	Team	Apps	(Gls)
2015–2018	PAOK	0	(0)
2016–2018	→ Panserraikos (loan)	41	(2)
2018–2020	Panachaiki	42	(0)
2020–2022	Kalamata	42	(0)
2022–2023	Apollon Smyrnis	17	(0)
2023–2024	Levadiakos	12	(0)
2024–2026	Kalamata	19	(0)
2026–	AEL	3	(0)

International career^{‡}
2015	Greece U19	7	(1)
2017	Greece U21	1	(0)
- * Club domestic league appearances and goals as of 21 September 2026 ‡ National team caps and goals as of 12 March 2018

Timotheos Tselepidis (Greek: Τιμόθεος Τσελεπίδης, born 2 February 1996) is a Greek professional footballer who plays as a centre-back for Super League 2 club AEL.

== Career ==
On 18 August 2018 it was announced that Tselepidis had signed for Football League Panachaiki on a free transfer from PAOK.
