= Aristidis Kokkoris =

Greek footballer

Personal information
- Date of birth: 16 July 1998 (age 28)
- Place of birth: Patras, Greece
- Height: 1.68 m (5 ft 6 in)
- Position: Winger

Team information
- Current team: PAS Pyrgos
- Number: 72

Youth career
- Panegialios

Senior career*
Years	Team	Apps	(Gls)
2017–2018	Panegialios	23	(4)
2018–2019	Panetolikos	1	(0)
2019	Volos	7	(2)
2019–2020	Othellos Athienou	10	(3)
2020–2021	Kavala	18	(5)
2021–2023	Kalamata	25	(0)
2023	Iraklis	12	(1)
2023–2024	Tilikratis	20	(3)
2024	Ethnikos Neo Keramidi	12	(0)
2025	Panargiakos	11	(0)
2025–	PAS Pyrgos	28	(6)
- * Club domestic league appearances and goals as of 27 September 2026

Aristidis Kokkoris (Greek: Αριστείδης Κόκκορης; born 16 July 1998) is a Greek professional footballer who plays as a winger for Super League 2 club PAS Pyrgos.

== Honours ==
Volos

- Football League: 2018–19
