= Hugo Borges =

Brazilian footballer (born 1998)

Personal information
- Full name: Hugo da Conceição Medeiros Borges Alves
- Date of birth: 1 January 1998 (age 28)
- Place of birth: Duque de Caxias, Brazil
- Height: 1.76 m (5 ft 9 in)
- Position: Forward

Team information
- Current team: Volta Redonda

Youth career
- –2018: Vasco da Gama

Senior career*
Years	Team	Apps	(Gls)
2018–2019	Vasco da Gama	1	(0)
2019–2021	Corinthians U-23	33	(8)
2020	→ Jorge Wilstermann (loan)	0	(0)
2021	→ Brusque (loan)	8	(1)
2022–2023	Kalamata	18	(2)
2023	Proodeftiki	13	(3)
2023–	Volta Redonda	5	(0)
- * Club domestic league appearances and goals as of 19:14, 19 September 2023 (UTC)

Hugo da Conceição Medeiros Borges Alves (born 1 January 1998), commonly known as Hugo Borges, is a Brazilian footballer who plays as a forward for Campeonato Brasileiro Série C club Volta Redonda.

== Career statistics ==
=== Club ===
As of 7 June 2020.

Club	Season	League			State league		Cup		Continental		Other		Total	
Club	Season	Division	Apps	Goals	Apps	Goals	Apps	Goals	Apps	Goals	Apps	Goals	Apps	Goals
Vasco da Gama	2018	Série A	0	0	1 (Note: Appearances in the Campeonato Carioca)	0	0	0	0	0	0	0	1	0
Vasco da Gama	2019	Série A	0	0	0	0	0	0	0	0	0	0	0	0
Vasco da Gama	Total		0	0	1	0	0	0	0	0	0	0	1	0
Corinthians B	2019	–									7 (Note: Appearances in the Copa Paulista)	0	7	0
Corinthians	2019	Série A	0	0	0	0	0	0	0	0	0	0	0	0
Corinthians	2020	Série A	0	0	0	0	0	0	0	0	0	0	0	0
Corinthians	Total		0	0	0	0	0	0	0	0	0	0	0	0
Jorge Wilstermann (loan)	2020	Bolivian Primera División	0	0	–		0	0	0	0	0	0	0	0
Career total			0	0	1	0	0	0	0	0	7	0	8	0
