= Christos Batzios =

Greek actor, filmmaker and athlete

- Born: 14 May 1990 (age 35); Kavala, Greece
- Occupation: Actor
- Years active: 2008–present
- Height: 192 cm (6 ft 4 in)

Christos Batzios (Greek: Χρήστος Μπάτζιος) is a Greek actor, filmmaker and athlete. He is known for his film roles and athletic performances.

== Life and career ==
Batzios was born in Kavala, a city in northern Greece. When he was fifteen, he moved to Thessaloniki, Greece, where he attended Mandoulides Highschool and began playing in several basketball clubs. He is also an athlete of martial arts, such as MMA and Wing Chun, and track & field. He graduated from the Aristotle University of Thessaloniki with a B.A in Physical Education.

Batzios started taking theater and film acting lessons along with studying in the university.

He later moved to Athens, Greece where he continued to take acting and voice lessons, until 2010 where he made his professional debut in theater. In 2011, Batzios presented his most well known play, the comedy Things to be ashamed of (Greek: Ντροπής Πράγματα), which was popular in Greece and Cyprus for 3 seasons, touring in more than 80 cities.

Batzios has played in several movies and theater plays, including many short films, documentaries, videoclips and other art projects. He has collaborated with directors in Greece, France and United Kingdom.

Christos Batzios is also a dancer, performing Contemporary Dance, Acrobatic Dance, Latin and other dances. He sings in music theater plays and writes lyrics for songs and for his plays. Batzios has also been a radio producer.

== Selected filmography & plays ==
Title	Role	Notes
Α mon age, je me cache encore pour fumer	Karim	Drama
Nikos Kazantzakis	Novel Man	Drama - Biography
Poor Vision	Petros	Drama
Exodos 1826	Avramoulis	Drama - Historic & Documentary
Comedy Bang	John	Comedy
The Keys	Mark	Thriller
It's not what it looks like	Paulos	Comedy
Ntropis Pragmata	Chris	Comedy
Life again	Chris	Drama
Lily	George	Drama
Nihterini Οmada Εrgasias	John	Comedy
Hot Water	Giannis	Comedy
Mia Agkalia	Christos	Drama
Look where you are	Nick	Drama
Fifth Sun	Bill	Drama
3 Typoi gia gelia & gia klammata	Giannis	Comedy
Fools	L. S. Tolchinsky	Comedy

== Business and productions ==
Christos Batzios is also the founder of the production company PROMiS Productions and the media group PROMiS Media.
