= Konstantinos Kapoutaglis =

Greek footballer

Kostas Kapoutaglis
Personal information
- Full name: Konstantinos Kapoutaglis
- Date of birth: 1 July 1996 (age 30)
- Place of birth: Athens, Greece
- Height: 1.85 m (6 ft 1 in)
- Position: Goalkeeper

Team information
- Current team: Panionios

Youth career
- 2013–2015: Nea Ionia
- 2015–2016: Panachaiki

Senior career*
Years	Team	Apps	(Gls)
2016	Panachaiki	0	(0)
2016–2018	PAO Varda	43	(0)
2018–2020	Panachaiki	11	(0)
2020–2021	Kalamata	0	(0)
2022–	Panionios	0	(0)

International career^{‡}
2015	Greece U19	1	(0)
- * Club domestic league appearances and goals as of 7 October 2020 ‡ National team caps and goals as of 30 March 2015

Konstantinos Kapoutaglis (Greek: Κωνσταντίνος Καπούταγλης; born 1 July 1996) is a Greek professional footballer who plays as a goalkeeper for Gamma Ethniki club Panionios.
