= Panagiotis Konstantinopoulos =

Greek footballer

Personal information
- Date of birth: 5 September 1995 (age 31)
- Place of birth: Achaea, Greece
- Height: 1.76 m (5 ft 9 1/2 in)
- Position: Midfielder

Team information
- Current team: Kalamata
- Number: 24

Youth career
- 2010–2014: Panetolikos

Senior career*
Years	Team	Apps	(Gls)
2014–2016	Panetolikos	2	(0)
2016–2017	Achaiki	26	(2)
2017–2018	Anagennisi Karditsa	26	(0)
2018–2019	Sparta	14	(0)
2019	Ialysos	0	(0)
2019–	Kalamata	103	(2)
- * Club domestic league appearances and goals as of 15 June 2025

Panagiotis Konstantinopoulos (Greek: Παναγιώτης Κωνσταντινόπουλος; born 5 September 1995) is a Greek professional footballer who plays as a midfielder for Super League 2 club Kalamata.

== Career ==
Coming out of the Panetolikos youth academy, Konstantinopoulos signed his first professional contract on 28 August 2014. He made his Super League Greece debut on 9 November 2015, coming off the bench against PAS Giannina.

On 9 September 2016, he signed a contract with Achaiki.

On 15 February 2019, he joined Ialysos. After a six-month tenure in the club, he joined Kalamata on a free transfer.

On 30 June 2021, his contract with the club was extended for two more years.
