= Konstantinos Tsirigotis =

Greek footballer

Personal information
- Date of birth: 10 March 2001 (age 25)
- Place of birth: Greece
- Position: Centre-back

Team information
- Current team: Ionikos

Youth career
- Atromitos

Senior career*
Years	Team	Apps	(Gls)
2019–	Ionikos	29	(0)
- * Club domestic league appearances and goals as of 21 January 2024

Konstantinos Tsirigotis (Greek: Κωνσταντίνος Τσιριγώτης; born 10 March 2001) is a Greek professional footballer who plays as a centre-back for Ionikos.
