= Giorgos Simos =

Greek football manager (born 1978)

Personal information
- Date of birth: 29 March 1978 (age 48)
- Place of birth: Ioannina, Greece
- Height: 1.80 m (5 ft 11 in)
- Position: Defender

Youth career
- Panathinaikos

Senior career*
Years	Team	Apps	(Gls)
1999	Panathinaikos	3	(0)
2000	Agios Nikolaos	16	(3)
2001–2002	OFI	23	(0)
2002–2005	Chalkidona	71	(2)
2005–2006	AEL	17	(0)
2006	AEK Larnaca	7	(0)
2007	Ionikos	9	(0)
2008	Panetolikos	17	(0)
2008	Ethnikos Piraeus	4	(1)
2009–2010	Kallithea		
2010–2011	Rouf		

Managerial career
- 2012–2016: Panathinaikos (youth)
- 2016–2017: Omonia (assistant)
- 2017–2019: AEK Athens U20
- 2019–2021: OFI
- 2021–2022: Greece U21
- 2022–2023: Kallithea
- 2023: Ionikos
- 2024–2025: Asteras Tripolis B
- 2025–2026: Olympiacos U19
- * Club domestic league appearances and goals

Giorgos Simos (Greek: Γιώργος Σίμος; born 29 March 1978) is a Greek professional football manager and former player.

== Playing career ==
Born in Ioannina, Simos came through the ranks at Panathinaikos, before being promoted to the senior team in 1999. He later played for Agios Nikolaos, OFI, Chalkidona, AEL, AEK Larnaca, Ionikos, Panetolikos, Ethnikos Piraeus, Kallithea and Rouf.

== Managerial career ==
Simos holds a holds the UEFA Pro Licence.

=== Early career ===
In August 2012, Simos returned to Panathinaikos to begin his coaching career, quickly rising through the academy to lead the Under-15, Under-17, and Under-20 teams in successive seasons from 2013/14 through 2015/16. After spending a part of the 2016/17 season as an assistant coach at Cypriot top flight club Omonia, Simos took on the AEK Athens Under-20 team for one-and-a-half seasons to February 2019.

=== OFI ===
On 12 July 2019, Simos was named manager of OFI following the departure of Jaime Vera. In his debut season, Simos would guide OFI to a sixth-place finish in Super League 1 and their first qualification for the UEFA Europa League in 20 years. In the 2020–21 UEFA Europa League, OFI would be eliminated by Apollon Limassol in the second qualifying round. Simos would resign from his position as manager prior to the end of the 2020/21 season with OFI in 11th place.

=== Greece Under-21 national team ===
On 26 May 2021, Simos was appointed manager of the Greece Under-21 national team, with whom he would finish third behind Portugal and Iceland in qualification for the 2023 UEFA European Under-21 Championship.

=== Kallithea ===
On 30 November 2022, Simos was appointed manager of Kallithea.

== Managerial statistics ==
As of match updated 22 December 2023

Managerial record by team and tenure
Team	From	To	Record					Ref.
Team	From	To	P	W	D	L	Win %	Ref.
AEK Athens U20	1 July 2017	30 June 2019	60	35	7	18	58.33	
OFI	12 July 2019	6 Μarch 2021	68	16	11	41	23.53	
Greece U21	20 May 2021	30 June 2022	10	5	2	3	50.00	
Kallithea	2 December 2022	30 June 2023	24	16	5	3	66.67	
Ionikos	5 July 2023	21 December 2023	13	5	4	4	38.46	
Total			175	77	29	69	44.00	—

== Honours ==
=== Player ===
Chalkidona

- Football League
  - Champion: 2002-03

Kallithea

- Gamma Ethniki
  - Champion: 2009-10
