= Vasilios Triantafyllakis =

Greek footballer

Personal information
- Date of birth: 2 June 1998 (age 28)
- Place of birth: Kalamata, Greece
- Height: 1.70 m (5 ft 7 in)
- Position: Midfielder

Youth career
- 2009–2014: Arsenal
- 2014–2017: Levadiakos
- 2016–2017: AEK Larnaca

Senior career*
Years	Team	Apps	(Gls)
2017–2019	Digenis Akritas Morphou	33	(9)
2019–2020	PAEEK	8	(1)
2020–2021	Kalamata	13	(1)
2021–2022	Almopos Aridea	27	(2)
2022–2024	Kalamata	10	(0)
- * Club domestic league appearances and goals as of 16 June 2023

Vasilios Triantafyllakis (Greek: Βασίλειος Τριανταφυλλάκης; born 2 June 1998) is a Greek professional footballer who plays as a midfielder.

== Honours ==
Digenis Akritas Morphou

- Cypriot Third Division: 2018–19
- Cypriot Cup for lower divisions: 2018–19
