= Dimitrios Spanos =

Greek coach and retired association football player (born 1969)

Dimitris Spanos
Personal information
- Full name: Dimitrios Spanos
- Date of birth: 13 July 1969 (age 57)
- Place of birth: Aigio, Greece
- Height: 1.90 m (6 ft 3 in)
- Position: Centre-forward

Team information
- Current team: PAS Pyrgos (manager)

Managerial career
- Years: Team
- 2005–2007: Anagennisi Arta
- 2007: Vyzas Megara
- 2007–2008: Aias Salamina
- 2008–2009: Rodos
- 2009–2010: Panachaiki
- 2010: Panegialios
- 2011: Rodos
- 2012–2013: Ermionida
- 2014: Panelefsiniakos
- 2014–2016: Panachaiki
- 2016: Lamia
- 2016: Apollon Smyrni
- 2016–2017: Panegialios
- 2017–2018: Aris
- 2018–2019: Kerkyra
- 2019: Doxa Drama
- 2019: Levadiakos
- 2020–2023: Ionikos
- 2023–2024: Ionikos
- 2024: Chania
- 2024–2025: Kalamata
- 2025: Iraklis
- 2025–2026: Anagennisi Karditsa
- 2026–: PAS Pyrgos

Dimitris Spanos (Greek: Δημήτρης Σπανός; born 13 July 1969) is a Greek professional football manager and former player.

== Managerial statistics ==
As of match played 1 November 2026

Managerial record by team and tenure
Team	From	To	Record				
Team	From	To	G	W	D	L	Win %
Panachaiki	2014	2016	68	16	14	38	23.53
Lamia	2016	2016	20	11	6	3	55.00
Apollon Smyrni	2016	2016	10	6	2	2	60.00
Panegialios	2016	2017	34	11	11	12	32.35
Aris	2017	2018	37	27	8	2	72.97
Kerkyra	2018	2019	30	14	5	11	46.67
Doxa Drama	2019	2019	12	6	4	2	50.00
Levadiakos	2019	2019	3	0	0	3	0.00
Ionikos	2020	2023	83	30	19	34	36.14
Ionikos	2023	2024	18	7	7	4	38.89
Chania	2024	2024	5	0	1	4	0.00
Kalamata	2024	2025	20	15	3	2	75.00
Iraklis	2025	2025	9	6	2	1	66.67
Anagennisi Karditsa	2025	2026	9	1	2	6	11.11
PAS Pyrgos	2026		2	1	1	0	50.00
Total			360	151	85	124	41.94
