= GS Ilioupolis =

- Full name: Gymnastic Club Ilioupolis
- Founded: 1953; 73 years ago
- Ground: Ilioupoli Municipal Stadium
- Capacity: 3,055
- Chairman: Apostolos Kostoulas
- Manager: Nikolaos Kotsovos
- League: Gamma Ethniki
- 2025–26: Super League Greece 2 (South Group), 9th (relegated)
Home colours	Away colours

GS Ilioupolis (Greek: Γ.Σ. Ηλιούπολης) is a multi-sport club based in Ilioupoli, Greece.

The club was founded in 1953, and it has about 2,000 athletes competing in nine sports.

== Colours and crest ==
GS Ilioupoli's colours are red and blue and its logo features a setting sun on its nearby mountains and the ground.

== Sports ==
- Basketball (Men's and Women's)
- Football
- Judo
- Tennis
- Track and field
- Swimming
- Volleyball (Men's and Women's)
- Water polo
- Handball (defunct)
- Futsal (defunct)

== Football team ==
The football team of Ilioupolis achieved promotion to the Beta Ethniki (2nd tier championship) during the 2021–22 season.

== Honours ==
- Gamma Ethniki
  - Winners (1): 2021–22
- Delta Ethniki
  - Winners (2): 1984–85, 2005–06
- Athens FCA First Division
  - Winners (3): 1981–82, 1987–88, 1995–96
- Athens FCA Cup
  - Winners (3): 1974–75, 1977–78, 2021–22

== Players ==
=== Current squad ===
As of 26 February 2026

Note: Flags indicate national team as defined under FIFA eligibility rules; some limited exceptions apply. Players may hold more than one non-FIFA nationality.

No.	Pos.	Nation	Player
1	GK	GRE	Dimitrios Politis
3	DF	GRE	Vangelis Keramidas
5	DF	GRE	Mavroudis Bougaidis
6	MF	MLI	Ousmane Sountoura
7	MF	GRE	Georgios Tsilingiris
8	MF	GRE	Orestis Kreci (captain)
10	FW	GRE	Michalis Kouiroukidis
11	MF	ARG	Iván Ortigoza
13	MF	GRE	Konstantinos Koltsidas
14	MF	TTO	Judah García
17	FW	GRE	Dimitris Kalamvokis
18	MF	GRE	Dimitris Thomaidis
21	MF	GRE	Antonis Papasavvas

No.	Pos.	Nation	Player
22	DF	ESP	Sergio Chica
23	DF	GRE	Marios Kostoulas
25	MF	GRE	Miltiadis Innos
27	MF	ARG	Rafael Blancq
30	FW	RUS	Aleksey Chayka
32	DF	GRE	Georgios Maidanos
44	DF	SEN	Atkhana Ndao
69	DF	GRE	Sotirios Katsioulas
77	DF	GRE	Manolis Sbokos (on loan from A.E. Kifisia)
88	FW	GRE	Michalis Tsoumanis
97	GK	GRE	Ilias Kyritsis
99	GK	GRE	Apostolos Barmpopoulos

== Basketball team ==
Ilioupolis has basketball team both men's and women's. The basketball team of GS Ilioupolis plays in the Athens local divisions. Biggest success of the club was winning the Gamma Ethniki championship, in the season 1994–95

== Volleyball team ==
The women’s volleyball team of GS Ilioupolis plays in the A1 Ethniki (1st-tier championship). It plays for 2nd consecutive season in A1 Ethniki and has played again in the past, from 1995 to 1999.

== Water polo team ==
GS Ilioupolis water polo team plays in A1 Ethniki Water Polo. It won the ascension during the last season (2014–15) when it finished in the 2nd place in A2 Ethniki championship.

== Track and field ==
- Rankings:
  - 2010: 63rd (out of 321 clubs)
  - 2011: 49th (out of 299 clubs).
  - 2012: 44th (out of 281 clubs)

== Futsal team ==
Ilioupoli had a futsal team. This team had won a Greek cup in 2009. In the same year it was the finalist of the championship. The next years, Ilioupoli Futsal team finished in the 5th or 6th place of the championship until 2012 when the team withdrew from the championship.

== Titles ==
Futsal team

- Hellenic Futsal Cup
  - Winner (1) :2009
