= Ntinos Pontikas =

Greek footballer

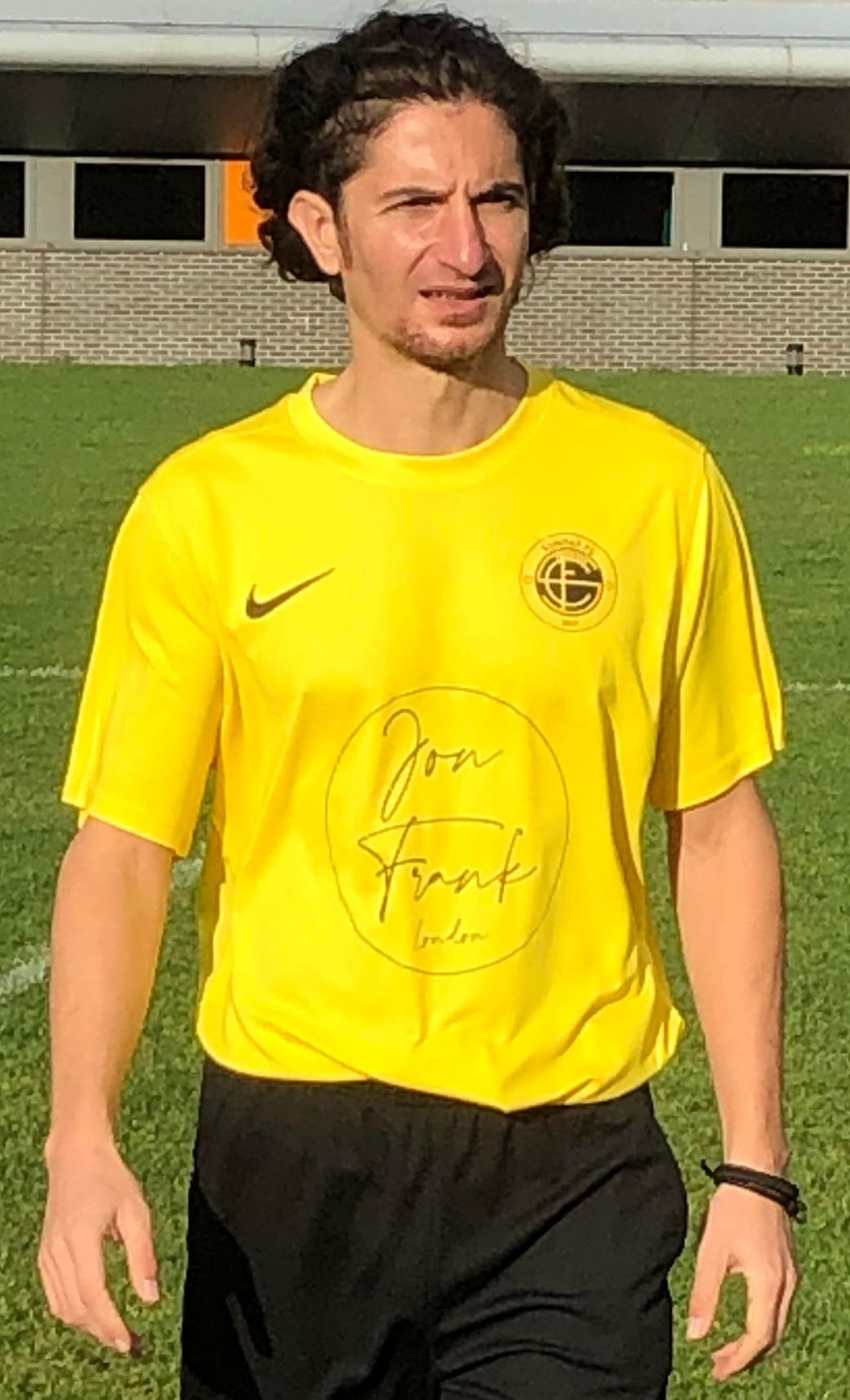

Personal information
- Full name: Konstantinos Pontikas
- Date of birth: 27 February 1982 (age 44)
- Place of birth: Larissa, Greece
- Height: 1.81 m (5 ft 11 in)
- Position: Striker

Ntinos Pontikas (Greek: Ντίνος Ποντίκας; born 27 February 1982) is a Greek former footballer who played as a striker. He holds the record for the youngest player ever to score a hat-trick.

== Career ==
Pontikas started off with street football before having a brief spell at Toxotis Larissa's youth section in 1995 where Theofanis Gekas was also playing at the time. He subsequently joined Haravgi and was immediately promoted to the first team, scoring a hat-trick on his debut at the age of 14. A few years later he was forced to quit football at a young age due to an injury.

Pontikas was considered one of the fastest players of his generation, able to run 100 metres in less than 11 seconds and is recognized as one of Greek football's best talents.

After his early retirement he briefly returned to football twice with local Greek clubs. During the 2021–22 season he featured in an English amateur division playing a full 90-minutes on his debut. He later returned to the LFCA local leagues in Greece, where he had started his career from.

== Record ==
On 24 September 1996, Pontikas became the youngest footballer ever to score a hat-trick at 14 years and 198 days. On his debut match as a starter with Haravgi he scored his team's all 3 goals in their away 4–3 defeat to Ampelokipoi, in the fifth tier of the Greek championship. Opponents Ampelokipoi squad featured 1988 Greek champion Giorgos Kolovos, 1985 Cup winner and club captain Babis Ntosas, (both as AEL players), and also future Greece international defender Vangelis Moras as an unused substitute.

Pontikas recorded jaw-dropping scoring performances on two more occasions, but in unofficial games. The first was in 1995 when he scored 13 goals, aged 13, in an XI friendly, and the second in 1997 with the youngster hitting the net 10 times in a youth match. He also holds the national record for the youngest player to feature in a U-18 high school county league final, at 14 years and 9 months.

=== Other accomplishments ===
- Youngest known player to score 13 goals in an XI game: 1995-96
- Player with longest gap between appearances in the same league in Greek football: 2023-24 Larissa FCA, after 26 seasons
- Longest gap between goals scored in the same association league in Greek football: 2024-25 Larissa FCA, after 27 seasons
- Longest gap between spells for the same club worldwide: 1995-96 to 2024-25 with Toxotis Larissa, 28 seasons

== See also ==
- List of world association football records
- List of footballers who achieved hat-trick records
