= List of footballers who achieved hat-trick records =

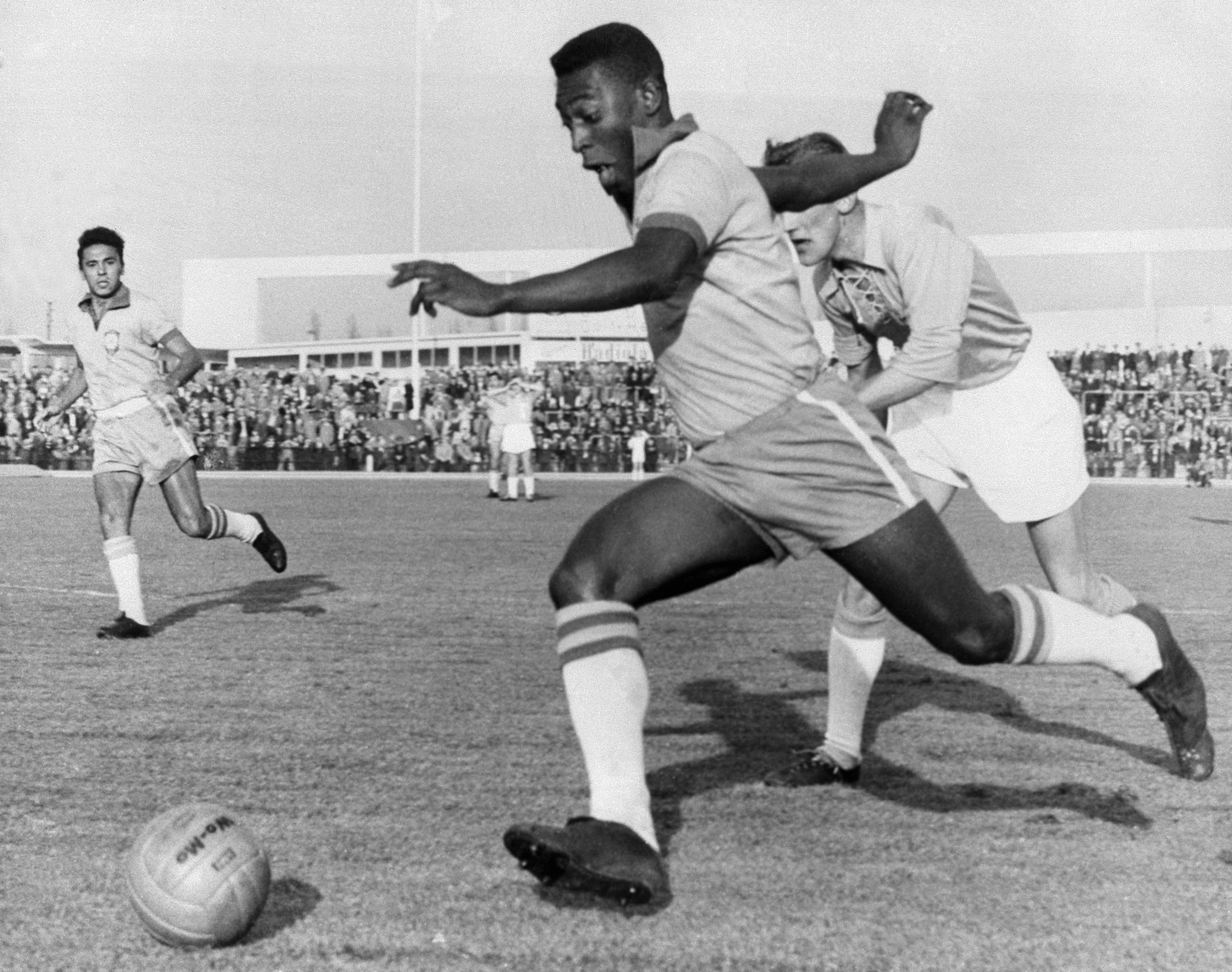
Pelé scored 92 hat-tricks during his career for Santos, NY Cosmos and Brazil. As of 2023, Guinness World Records recognised Pelé as the footballer with the most hat-tricks.

Scoring a hat-trick in association football is considered an impressive achievement, even after many years and advances in the sport; however, it is still fairly common. This is a list of records and other feats in football hat-trick scoring, including exceptional numbers of hat-tricks; exceptional feats in scoring a hat-trick; and achievements relating to the hat-trick scorers themselves.

The great majority of the scorers of a hat-trick have played for the winning side, but there have also been occasions when the hat-trick scorer's team drew or lost the match. The list features all association footballers, at all levels of competition, when playing in official matches.

== Records ==
Key
	Hat-trick scorer's team is noted in **bold**
Division	The level of competition of the relevant match(es)

=== Most hat-tricks ===
==== Most hat-tricks in history ====
Player	Years	Number	Gender	Details
(Germany) Erwin Helmchen	1924–1951	142+	M	According to RSSSF, Erwin Helmchen scored at least 142 hat-tricks only in official matches, including 8 goals on 2 occasions, 7 goals on three, 6 goals ten times and 5 goals 15 times.
(Austria) (Czech Republic) Josef Bican	1930–1957	137	M	According to RSSSF, Josef Bican scored 137 hat-tricks only in official matches for club and country.
(Hungary) Ferenc Deák	1939–1959	97+	M	According to RSSSF, Ferenc Deak scored at least 97 hat-tricks only in official matches for club and country.
(Poland) Ernst Wilimowski	1932–1957	96+	M	According to RSSSF, Ernst Wilimowski scored at least 96 hat-tricks only in official matches for club and country.
(Brazil) Pelé	1956–1977	92	M	As of 2023, Guinness World Records recognised Pelé as the footballer with the most hat-tricks.
(England) Jimmy Jones	1943–1965	91	M	

==== Active players with most hat-tricks ====
Player	Years	Number	Gender	Details
(Portugal) Cristiano Ronaldo	2008–2026	67	M	Cristiano Ronaldo holds the record for the active player with most hat-tricks.
(Argentina) Lionel Messi	2007–2026	62	M	Lionel Messi has scored 62 hat-tricks in his career for Barcelona, Inter Miami and Argentina.

==== Most hat-tricks for a national team ====
Top 10 listed

Player	Years	Number	Gender	Details
(United States) Alex Morgan	2012–2021	12	F	Morgan scored her eleventh international hat-trick with five goals on 11 June 2019 in the United States' 13–0 victory over Thailand in the 2019 World Cup. She scored her record-breaking twelfth international hat-trick in 2021.
(Canada) Christine Sinclair	2000–2012	11	F	Sinclair scored her eleventh international hat-trick by scoring all three of Canada's goals in their 3–4 loss to the United States at the Olympics on 6 August 2012.
(Argentina) Lionel Messi	2012–2026	11	M	Lionel Messi became the first male player to score 11 international hat-tricks on 16 June 2026 in Argentina's 3–0 victory over Algeria.
(England) Vivian Woodward	1903–1914	10	M	He scored 4 hat-tricks for England and 6 hat-tricks for England amateurs.
(Portugal) Cristiano Ronaldo	2013–2021	10	M	Cristiano Ronaldo became the first male player to score 10 hat-tricks for a national team on 12 October 2021 in Portugal's 5–0 win against Luxembourg, breaking Sven Rydell's record.
(Sweden) Sven Rydell	1924–1932	9	M	Sven Rydell became the first player to score 9 international hat-tricks on 16 May 1932 in Sweden's 7–1 victory over Finland, breaking Poul Nielsen's record. His men's record lasted for 89 years.
(United States) Carli Lloyd	2012–2021	9	F	Lloyd scored 9 international hat-tricks including a five-goal haul in one of her final international matches.
(United Arab Emirates) Ali Mabkhout	2012–2021	9	M	As of 2023, Mabkhout has scored 9 international hat-tricks.
(Denmark) Poul Nielsen	1913–1921	8	M	Poul Nielsen became the first player to score 8 international hat-tricks on 2 October 1921 in Denmark's 3–1 victory over Norway. His record lasted for 11 years.
(West Germany) Gerd Müller	1967–1972	8	M	Müller scored 8 international hat-tricks for West Germany, including 2 in the 1970 World Cup.
(Netherlands) Vivianne Miedema	2013 – 2025	8	F	As of 2026, Miedema has scored 8 internacional hat-tricks.

==== Most consecutive hat-tricks in history ====
Player	Year	Number	Gender	Division	Details
(Bohemia) Josef Bican	1940	5	M	1	Josef Bican set the record after scoring 5 consecutive hat-tricks and 19 goals in total in the Bohemia and Moravia (Czechoslovak) First League between 17 November 1939 and 19 March 1940.
(Croatia) Stjepan Lucijanić	2016	5	M	7	Stjepan Lucijanic scored his fifth consecutive hat-trick in the NK Dračice Dakovo's 10–0 win over NK Zrinski Drenje in the Croatian seventh division on 6 November 2016, equalizing Josef Bican's record from 1940. Lucijanic had scored 20 goals in those 5 matches.
(Maldives) Ahmed Rizwan	2018	5	M	1	Club Eagles' striker Ahmed Rizwan also equalized the record in October 2018, after scoring five hat-tricks in five consecutive matches of the Dhiraagu Dhivehi Premier League.

==== Most hat-tricks for a year ====
Player	Year	Number	Gender	Division	Details
(Albania) Refik Resmja	1951	10	M	1	Refik Resmja scored 10 hat-tricks in 1951, all in Albanian Superliga.
(Armenia) Arman Karamyan	2002	9	M	1	Arman Karamyan scored 8 hat-tricks in Armenian Premier League and 1 in national cup.
(Armenia) Ara Hakobyan	2003	9	M	1	Ara Hakobyan scored 9 hat-tricks in Armenian Premier League.
(Portugal) Cristiano Ronaldo	2011	9	M	1	Cristiano Ronaldo scored 9 hat-tricks in La Liga.
(Argentina) Lionel Messi	2012	9	M	1	Lionel Messi scored 6 hat-tricks in La Liga, 1 in UEFA Champions League and 2 with the national team.
(Netherlands) Vivianne Miedema	2013	9	F	1	Vivianne Miedema scored 7 hat-tricks in BeNe League and 2 with the national team.
(Maldives) Ali Ashfaq	2013	9	M	1	Ali Ashfaq scored 5 hat-tricks in Dhivehi League, 2 in AFC Cup and 2 with the national team.

==== Most hat-tricks in the Olympics ====
Player	Year	Score	Number	Gender	Details
(Argentina) Domingo Tarasconi	1928	**Argentina** 11–2 USA; **Argentina** 6–3 Belgium; **Argentina** 6–0 Egypt	3	M	Domingo Tarasconi scored 4 goals against USA on 29 May 1928 in the first round, 4 goals against Norway on 2 June in quarterfinals and 3 against Egypt in the semifinal of the 1928 Olympics.
(Zambia) Barbra Banda	2020; 2020; 2024	**Zambia** 3–10 Netherlands; **Zambia** 4–4 China; Australia 6–5 **Zambia**	3	F	Barbra Banda scored hat-tricks twice at the 2020 Summer Olympics and she also scored once at the 2024 Summer Olympics.
(Denmark) Vilhelm Wolfhagen	1908	**Denmark** 9–0 France B **Denmark** 17–1 France	2	M	Vilhelm Wolfhagen scored 4 goals against France B on 19 October 1908 in the first round and 4 goals against France on 22 October in the semi-finals of the 1908 Olympics.
(Czechoslovakia) Antonin Janda	1920	**Czechoslovakia** 7–0 Kingdom of SCS; **Czechoslovakia** 4–0 Norway	2	M	Antonin Janda scored 3 goals against Yugoslavia on 28 August 1920 in the first round and 3 goals against Norway on 29 August in the quarterfinals of the 1920 Olympics.
(Hungary) Ferenc Bene	1964	**Hungary** 6–0 Morocco; **Hungary** 6–0 United Arab Republic	2	M	Ferenc Bene scored Hungary's all 6 goals against Morocco on 11 October 1964 in the group stage and 4 goals against Norway on 20 October in the semifinals of the 1964 Olympics.

=== Age records ===
Note: For a senior team; when referring to clubs, not including subsidiary teams in senior leagues

==== Youngest players to score a hat-trick for a club team ====
Player	Year	Age	Score	Goals	Gender	Division	Details
(Greece) Ntinos Pontikas	1996	14 years and 198 days	Ampelokipoi 4–3 **Haravgi**	3	M	5	Ntinos Pontikas on his debut on 28 September 1996, scored his team's all 3 away goals in the fifth tier of the Greek championship breaking Paulino Alcántara's record set in 1912 and becoming the youngest hat-trick scorer ever.
(Iceland) Alexander Rafn Pálmason	2025	15 years and 12 days	**KR Reykjavíkur** 11–0 KÁ Ásvellir	3	M	1/5	Alexander Rafn Pálmason scored a hat-trick for KR Reykjavíkur in their 11-0 win over fifth-division KÁ Ásvellir in the third round of the Icelandic Cup on 19 April 2025.
(Philippines) (Spain) Paulino Alcántara	1912	15 years and 140 days	**Barcelona** 9–0 Català	3	M	Reg.	Paulino Alcántara scored three goals on his senior team debut for Barcelona in their 9–0 victory over Català in the Catalan championship on 25 February 1912. Alcántara netted many other hat-tricks for Barcelona before turning 17, mostly in friendlies throughout the 1912–13 season, but notably in a 11–1 victory over Català in the Copa de España on 15 June 1913, at the age of 16 years and 248 days.
(United Kingdom) Amy Wilding	2003	15 years and 220 days	CTC Ladies [?]–[?] **Camberley Town Ladies**	3	F	7	Wilding scored three goals for Camberley Town Ladies in the Russell Cup on 30 March 2003 and became the youngest hat-trick scorer in women's football.
(United Kingdom) Lily Parr	1921	15 years and 261 days	**Dick, Kerr Ladies** 12–0 Bath Ladies	4	F	[?]	Parr scored a hat-trick for Dick, Kerr Ladies on 15 January 1921 at Old Trafford.
(Norway) Ada Hegerberg	2011	16 years and 25 days	**Kolbotn Fotball** ?–? Røa IL	3	F	1	
(Ireland) Samuel Johnston	1883	16 years and 159 days	**Distillery** 4–0 Wellington Park	3	M	1	Johnston scored a hat-trick for Distillery in a 4–0 win over Wellington Park in the second round of the Irish Cup on 24 February 1883.
(Brazil) Pelé	1957	16 years and 197 days	**Santos** 7–2 Fabril de Lavras	4	M	5/Fr.	Pelé scored his first hat-trick of his senior career in a friendly against Fabril de Lavras on 9 June 1957 and became the youngest player in South America to achieve that feat as well as the youngest professional player to score a hat-trick.
(Netherlands) Vivianne Miedema	2013	16 years and 243 days	Club Brugge 3–4 **SC Heerenveen**	3	F	1	Miedema scored her career first hat-trick in a match against Club Brugge in the BeNe League.
(England) Trevor Francis	1971	16 years and 306 days	**Birmingham City** 4–0 Bolton	4	M	2	Francis scored all of Birmingham City's four goals in their 4–0 win over Bolton Wanderers in England's second tier on 20 February 1971, and became the youngest player in English football to achieve that feat.

==== Youngest players to score a hat-trick for a national team ====
Player	Year	Age	Score	Goals	Gender	Details
(Kyrgyzstan) Alina Litvinenko	2009	13 years and 131 days	**Kyrgyzstan** 4–1 Palestine	3	F	On 27 April 2009, Alina Litvinenko scored a hat-trick in her debut match, in a 4–1 win against Palestine for Kyrgyzstan in the 2010 Asian Cup's qualification at 13 years and 131 days. She became both the youngest hat-trick scorer and the youngest player to feature in an international match.
(Hungary) József Horváth	1907	16 years and 193 days	**Hungary** 5–2 Bohemia	3	M	Horváth scored an international hat-trick for Hungary in a friendly against Bohemia on 7 April 1907 and became the youngest player in international football to achieve that feat.
(Malta) Haley Bugeja	2020	16 years and 205 days	**Malta** 4–0 Georgia	3	F	Bugeja scored all of Malta's four goals in their 4–0 win over Georgia in the UEFA Women's Euro 2022 qualifying Group B, and became the youngest player ever to score a hat-trick at a European qualifier.
(Scotland) Julie Fleeting	1997	16 years and 259 days	**Scotland** 7–1 Estonia	4	F	Fleeting scored four goals to help her side to a 7–1 victory over Estonia in the 1999 FIFA Women's World Cup qualification on 3 September, and became the youngest player to score a hat-trick at a World qualifier. In the very next match four days later, Fleeting scored another hat-trick, this time in a 5–0 win over Lithuania.
(Canada) Christine Sinclair	2000	17 years and 16 days	**Canada** 12–0 Guatemala	3	F	Sinclair had just turned 17 when she scored a hat-trick for Canada in the 2000 CONCACAF Women's Gold Cup.
(Netherlands) Vivianne Miedema	2013	17 years and 102 days	Portugal 0–7**Netherlands**	3	F	Miedema scored a hat-trick in her second appearance for Netherlands against Portugal in the 2015 FIFA Women's World Cup qualification.
(Paraguay) Claudia Martínez	2025	17 years and 179 days	**Paraguay** 4–0 Bolivia	3	F	
(Republic of China (1912–1949)) Lee Wai Tong	1923	17 years and 212 days	**China** 5–1 Japan	3	M	Lee is the youngest male player to score a hat-trick for a national team in a competitive match, when he did so on 24 May 1923 in the last match of the 1923 Far Eastern Games at Yahataya Park in Osaka.
(Brazil) Pelé	1958	17 years and 244 days	**Brazil** 5–2 France	3	M	Pelé is the youngest male player to score a hat-trick in the FIFA World Cup when he did so in the 1958 semi-finals.

==== Oldest players to score a hat-trick for a national team ====
Player	Year	Age	Score	Goals	Gender	Details
(Argentina) Lionel Messi	2026	38 years and 358 days	**Argentina** 3–0 Algeria	3	M	On 16 June 2026, Messi scored his 11th international hat-trick for Argentina in a 2026 FIFA World Cup.
(India) Sunil Chhetri	2023	38 years and 318 days	**India** 4–0 Pakistan	3	M	On 21 June 2023, Chhetri scored his 4th international hat-trick for India in a 2023 SAFF Championship match.
(Poland) Robert Lewandowski	2026	38 years and 42 days	**Poland** 6–0 Romania	3	M	On 2 October 2026, Lewandowski scored his 7th international hat-trick for Poland in a 2026–27 UEFA Nations League match.
(Portugal) Cristiano Ronaldo	2021	36 years and 247 days	**Portugal** 5–0 Luxembourg	3	M	On 12 October 2021, Ronaldo scored his 10th international hat-trick for Portugal in a 2022 FIFA World Cup qualifying match.
(Iran) Ali Daei	2004	35 years and 236 days	**Iran** 7–0 Laos	4	M	On 17 November 2004, Ali Daei scored his 8th international hat-trick for Iran in a 2006 FIFA World Cup qualifying match.

==== Youngest players to score a hat-trick in Europe's top 5 leagues ====
Player	Year	Age	Score	Goals	Gender	Competition	Details
(Italy) Silvio Piola	1931	17 years and 132 days	**Pro Vercelli** 6–3 Napoli	3	M	Serie A	
(England) Georgia Stanway	2016	17 years and 210 days	**Manchester City** 3–0 Sunderland	3	F	Women's Super League	
(Spain) Pablo Pombo	1934	17 years and 222 Days	**Racing Santander** 3–1 RCD Espanyol	3	M	La Liga	
(France) Jérémy Ménez	2004	17 years and 255 days	**Sochaux** 4–0 Bordeaux	3	M	Ligue 1	
(England) Michael Owen	1998	18 years and 62 days	Liverpool 3–3 Sheffield Wednesday	3	M	Premier League	
(Germany) Walter Bechtold	1934	18 years and 118 Days	**Eintracht Frankfurt** 6–1 Borussia Neunkirchen	3	M	Bundesliga	

==== Youngest players to score a hat-trick in a continental club competition ====
Player	Year	Age	Score	Goals	Gender	Competition	Details
(Brazil) Ronaldo	1993	17 years and 18 days	**Cruzeiro** 6–1 Colo-Colo	3	M	Supercopa Libertadores	Ronaldo scored three goals for Cruzeiro in their 6-1 win over Colo-Colo in the first leg of the 1993 Supercopa Libertadores on 5 October 1993.

==== Oldest players to score a hat-trick in Europe's top 5 leagues ====
Player	Year	Age	Score	Goals	Gender	Competition	Details
(Spain) Jorge Molina	2021	39 years and 241 days	**Granada** 4–1 RCD Mallorca	3	M	La Liga	Striker Molina scored his first La Liga hat-trick on 19 December 2021, shortly before his 40th birthday. He holds the Guinness record for the oldest player to score a hat-trick in La Liga.
(Argentina) Rodrigo Palacio	2021	39 years and 86 days	**Bologna** 3–3 Fiorentina	3	M	Serie A	On 2 May 2021, Palacio scored his first hat-trick in Serie A, including an 84th-minute equalizer to salvage a 3–3 draw with Fiorentina, thus becoming the oldest player to achieve this feat in Serie A, breaking the previous record held by Silvio Piola since 1950.
(Spain) Joaquín	2019	38 years and 140 days	**Real Betis** 3–2 Athletic Bilbao	3	M	La Liga	
(Argentina) Alfredo Di Stéfano	1964	37 years and 255 days	**Real Betis** 3–2 Real Murcia	3	M	La Liga	On 15 March 1964, Di Stéfano also scored a then-record 22nd La Liga hat-trick against Real Murcia, thus becoming the oldest player to achieve that feat not only in La Liga, but also in Europe's top five leagues, a record that he held for 45 years until it was broken by Joaquín in 2019.
(Peru) Claudio Pizarro	2016	37 years and 151 days	**Werder Bremen** 4–1 Bayer Leverkusen	3	M	Bundesliga	He holds the record for the oldest player to score a hat-trick in the Bundesliga.
(France) Roger Courtois	1949	37 years and 146 days	**Sochaux** 6–2 Saint-Étienne	3	M	Ligue 1	
(England) Teddy Sheringham	2003	37 years and 146 days	**Portsmouth** 4–0 Bolton Wanderers	3	M	Premier League	He holds the record for the oldest player to score a hat-trick in the Premier League.
(Poland) Robert Lewandowski	2025	37 years and 80 days	**Barcelona** 4–2 Celta de Vigo	3	M	La Liga	
(Portugal) Cristiano Ronaldo	2022	37 years and 70 days	**Manchester United** 3–2 Norwich City	3	M	Premier League	
(Italy) Silvio Piola	1950	37 years and 51 days	**Novara** 4–2 Lazio	3	M	Serie A	

==== Oldest players to score a hat-trick in a continental club competition ====
Player	Year	Age	Score	Goals	Competition	Details
(Colombia) Dayro Moreno	2025	39 years and 218 days	GV San José 2–3 **Once Caldas**	3	Copa Sudamericana	
(Paraguay) Pablo Escobar	2017	38 years and 226 days	**The Strongest** 5–0 Unión Española	3	Copa Libertadores	On 23 February 2017, Escobar scored a second-half hat-trick against Unión Española in the second leg of the final stage of the 2017 Copa Libertadores qualifying stages, thus becoming the oldest hat-trick scorer in the competition's history.
(Hungary) Ferenc Puskás	1965	38 years and 173 days	**Real Madrid** 5–0 Feyenoord	4	European Cup	On 22 September 1965, Puskás notched his last UEFA goals against Feyenoord, during the second leg of the preliminary round, thus becoming the oldest hat-trick scorer in the competition's history.
(Bosnia and Herzegovina) Edin Džeko	2024	38 years and 128 days	Lugano 3–4 **Fenerbahçe**	3	UEFA Champions League	
(Singapore) Aleksandar Đurić	2008	37 years and 219 days	Perak 1–6 **Singapore Armed Forces**	4	AFC Cup	
(Brazil) Grafite	2016	37 years and 179 days	**Santa Cruz** 3–1 Independiente Medellín	3	Copa Sudamericana	
(Argentina) Gonzalo Bergessio	2021	36 years and 282 days	Nacional 4–4 Atlético Nacional	3	Copa Libertadores	
(Sweden) Zlatan Ibrahimović	2017	35 years and 136 days	**Manchester United** 3–0 St-Étienne	3	UEFA Europa League	
(Colombia) Dorlan Pabón	2023	35 years and 86 days	**Atlético Nacional** 3–1 Melgar	3	Copa Libertadores	
(Hungary) Ferenc Puskás (2)	1962	35 years and 31 days	Real Madrid 3–5 **Benfica**	3	European Cup	On 2 May 1962, Puskás scored his second hat-trick in a European Cup final against Benfica, thus becoming the oldest hat-trick scorer in a final.

=== Speed records ===
==== Fastest hat-tricks ====
Fastest as the shortest span between the first and third goal. Ten fastest hat-tricks listed.

Player	Year	Score	Duration	Gender	Division	Details
(England) Alex Torr	2013	**Rawson Springs** 7–1 Winn Gardens	70 seconds	M	19	Alex Torr completed a hat-trick in 70 seconds for pub team Rawson Springs in a match in the Meadowhall Sheffield & District U23 amateur English Sunday league in 2013.
(Sweden) Magnus Arvidsson	1995	**Hassleholms IF** 5–3 Landskrona	89 seconds	M	4	Magnus Arvidsson completed a hat-trick in 89 seconds in a match in the Swedish second tier and beat Tommy Ross' 1964 record by just one second.
(Scotland) Tommy Ross	1964	**Ross County** 8–1 Nairn	90 seconds	M	5	Tommy Ross scored a hat-trick in 90 seconds for Ross County against Nairn in the Scottish fifth division, on 28 November 1964 and held the world record for 31 years.
(Wales) Sarah Wiltshire	2025	Hitchin Belles 0–12 **Stevenage FC Women**	106 seconds	F	5	Wiltshire scored her first goal in the second minute and third goal in the fifth, to complete her hat-trick in 1 minute and 46 seconds and take the record for fastest known hat-trick in women's football.
(Argentina) Eduardo Maglioni	1973	**Independiente** 4–1 Gimnasia La Plata	111 seconds	M	1	
(Egypt) Abdel Hamid Bassiouny	2001	**Egypt** 8–2 Namibia	117 seconds	M	NT	2002 FIFA World Cup qualification.
(Republic of Ireland) Jimmy O'Connor	1967	**Shelbourne** 3–2 Bohemian	2 minutes and 13 seconds	M	1	
(England) Andy Locke	1995	**Nantwich Town** 3–0 Droylsden	2 minutes and 20 seconds	M	5/8	Fastest hat-trick in FA Cup.
(England) James Hayter	2004	**AFC Bournemouth** 6–0 Wrexham	2 minutes and 21 seconds	M	2	On 24 February 2004, he came on as an 84th-minute substitute while Bournemouth were 3–0 up at home to Wrexham and scored the fastest Football League hat-trick ever in 2 minutes and 21.88 seconds.
(Scotland) Ian St John	1959	**Motherwell** 3–4 Hibernian	2 minutes and 30 seconds	M	1	

==== Longest hat-tricks ====
Longest as the longest span between the first and third goal.

Player	Year	Score	Duration	Gender	Division	Details
(Brunei) Adi Said	2023	**Kasuka** 8–1 Wijaya	44638 minutes	M	1	In the league fixture on 2 July 2023, Adi Said scored his first goal on 40 minutes and his second at the stroke of half time. The match was suspended at 52' due to heavy rain, and the Football Association of Brunei Darussalam rescheduled the game to resume on 2 August. Adi converted a penalty 13 minutes after the match resumed, completing his hat-trick, almost a full month after starting it.
(Mexico) Santiago Gimenez	2023	**Feyenoord** 4–0 Ajax	4286 minutes	M	1	On 24 September 2023 Feyenoord's Santiago Gimenez scored two goals in De Klassieker against Ajax, which was abandoned due to the host's fans trashing their own stadium. The Match was resumed with the same scoreline and minutes played on 27 September 2023. Santiago Gimenez went on to add another goal. There were 4286 minutes between his first and third goal.
(Ghana) Kwame Ayew	1992	**Ghana** 2–2 (4–2 (a.e.t.)) Paraguay	104 minutes	M	NT	Kwame Ayew scored a hat-trick on 2 August 1992 in the 1992 Olympic quarter-finals, the first in the 17th minute and the third in the 120+1st; there were 104 minutes of gameplay between his first and third goals.
(England) Jack Snelus	2016	**Luton Town** 2–2 (4–3 (a.e.t.)) Dagenham & Redbridge	104 minutes	M	5	Snelus scored a hat-trick in Luton Town under-18s' 4–3 FA Youth Cup victory. His first goal was in the 9th minute, with both of the others in extra time, the third in the 113th; there were 104 minutes of gameplay between the first and third goals. It was not the only hat-trick in the game: all three of losing team Dagenham & Redbridge under-18s' goals were scored by Dylan Florence.
(England) Geoff Hurst	1966	**England** 2–2 (4–2 (a.e.t.)) West Germany	102 minutes	M	NT	Geoff Hurst scored a hat-trick on 30 July 1966 in the 1966 FIFA World Cup Final, the first in the 18th minute and the third in the 120th; there were 102 minutes of gameplay between his first and third goals.

== Other achievements ==
=== By position ===
==== Goalkeepers who scored a hat-trick ====
Player	Year	Score	Goals	Gender	Division	Details
(Socialist Federal Republic of Yugoslavia) Ilija Pantelic	1963	NK Trešnjevka 0–3 FK Vojvodina	3	M	1	Ilija Pantelic was the first goalkeeper to score a hat-trick (all by penalties) in the 1962–63 Yugoslav first division.
(Paraguay) José Luis Chilavert	1999	Vélez Sársfield 6–1 Ferro Carril Oeste	3	M	1	José Luis Chilavert scored a hat-trick of penalties for Vélez Sársfield on 28 November 1999 in the Argentine torneo Clausura
(Greece) Grigorios Athanasiou	2022	Pavlos Melas Stavroupoli 3–0 Aetos Vassilikon	3	M	4	Grigorios Athanasiou scored a hat-trick of penalties on 12 February 2022 in the Greek fourth division.

==== Defenders who scored a hat-trick ====
Note: Any player, while fielded as a defender. (Note: For example, Danny Butterfield is not included for scoring a hat-trick for Crystal Palace on 2 February 2010 against Wolves despite being a defender because he was fielded as a striker in the match.)

Player	Year	Score	Goals	Gender	Division	Details
(Spain) Fernando Hierro	1991; 1992; 1992; 2002	Espanyol 1–5 Real Madrid; Real Madrid 7–0 Espanyol; Real Madrid 5–2 Torpedo Moscow; Real Madrid 3–1 Real Zaragoza	3; 4; 3; 3	M	1	Fernando Hierro scored four hat-tricks in his career. The first and the second were against Espanyol on 30 November 1991 and 18 April 1992 respectively, in the 1991–92 La Liga, the third on 21 October 1992 in the second round of 1992–93 UEFA Cup and the fourth on 24 March 2002 in the 2001–02 La Liga.
(Netherlands) Ronald Koeman	1984; 1986; 1990	Ajax 14–0 Red Boys Differdange; PSV Eindhoven 6–1 RKC Waalwijk; Barcelona 7–2 Trabzonspor	3; 3; 3	M	1	Ronald Koeman scored three hat-tricks with three different clubs in his career.
(Netherlands) Aad Mansveld	1976; 1977	ADO Den Haag 8–2 Go Ahead Eagles; ADO Den Haag 4–3 West Ham United	3; 3	M	1	Den Haag's sweeper and captain scored two hat-tricks, the first was on 24 October 1976 in 1976–77 Eredivisie, the second in the first half against West Ham in the quarter-finals of the 1975–76 European Cup Winners' Cup on 3 March 1976.
(Kuwait) Musaed Neda	2004; 2005	Qadsia 3–0 Kuwait SC; Qadsia 3–1 Umm Salal	3; 3	M	1	Musaed Neda scored two hat-tricks in his career. The first was on 16 May 2004 on the semi-final round of the 2003–04 Kuwaiti Premier League and the second on 16 September 2005 in the 2005 Gulf Club Champions Cup.
(Spain) Sheila Sanchón	2008; 2008	Barcelona 10–1 UE Lleida; Barcelona 4–1 UE L'Estartit B	3; 3	F	2	Sheila Sanchón scored a hat-trick for Barcelona Femení in a league match, of the second division, on 27 January 2008. Youth striker Laura Carriba also scored a hat-trick in the match. In their next match, Sanchón scored a brace, and in the match following that, on 10 February 2008, she again scored a hat-trick in the team's 4–1 victory over UE L'Estartit's B team.
(Spain) Benguria	1927	Real Madrid 9–4 Extremeño	5	M	1	Benguria scored 5 goals against Extremeño in the 1927 Copa del Rey on 6 March 1927.
(West Germany) Bernard Dietz	1977	MSV Duisburg 6–3 FC Bayern Munich	4	M	1	Bernard Dietz, a prolific defender who even captained West Germany during his career scored 4 goals against Bayern in the 1977–78 Bundesliga on 5 November 1977.
(Spain) Marta Torrejón	2020	Real Sociedad 1–10 Barcelona	4	F	1	Marta Torrejón scored 4 goals for an all-conquering Barcelona Femení in their 2019–20 Supercopa de España Femenina final victory on 9 February 2020.
(England) Alvin Martin	1986	West Ham United 8–1 Newcastle United	3	M	1	Alvin Martin scored a hat-trick for West Ham United in the 1985–86 First Division on 21 April 1986.
(Scotland) Gary Gillespie	1986	Liverpool 5–0 Birmingham City	3	M	1	Centre-back Gary Gillespie scored a hat-trick for Liverpool in the 1985–86 First Division on 26 April 1986.
(England) Dean Gordon	1995	West Bromwich Albion 2–3 Crystal Palace	3	M	2	A brace of penalties and a header from a corner saw left-back Gordon score a first-half hat-trick in an away game on 23 December 1995.
(Socialist Federal Republic of Yugoslavia) Sinisa Mihajlovic	1998	Lazio 5–2 Sampdoria	3	M	1	Sinisa Mihajlovic scored three free kicks in that match.
(Turkey) Alpay Özalan	2002	Turkey 3–3 North Macedonia	3	M	NT	Alpay Özalan scored his only ever goals for Turkey equalizing the match against North Macedonia in the Group 4 of the 2002 FIFA World Cup qualification on 6 June 2001.
(Brazil) Naldo	2006	Eintracht Frankfurt 2–6 Werder Bremen	3	M	1	Naldo scored a hat-trick as Bundesliga leaders Werder Bremen won away at Eintracht Frankfurt, becoming the only Bundesliga defender to do so.
(Brazil) Réver	2013	Clube Atlético Mineiro 5–2 America-MG	3	M	5	Atletico's captain Rever scored a perfect hat-trick on 7 March 2013 in Campeonato Mineiro.
(England) Aden Flint	2015	Bristol City 8–2 Walsall	3	M	3	Aden Flint scored a hat-trick for the eventual 2015 third tier champions Bristol City on 3 May 2015.
(Uruguay) Ronald Araújo	2017	Rentistas 3–2 Villa Española	3	M	2	Araújo scored a hat-trick as a Center-back in the 3–2 win against Villa Española on 17 June 2017 in Uruguayan Segunda División.
(France) Layvin Kurzawa	2017	Paris Saint-Germain 5–0 Anderlecht	3	M	1	Layvin Kurzawa scored a hat-trick as a left-back in the 5–0 win against Anderlecht on 31 October 2017. He is the only defender to score a hat-trick in the UEFA Champions League.
(Egypt) Mahmoud Alaa	2018	Zamalek SC 3–0 Tala'ea El Gaish SC	3	M	1	Mahmoud has scored a hat-trick as a Center-back in the 3–0 win against Tala'ea El Gaish on 13 September 2018.
(Netherlands) Daley Blind	2018	Ajax 8–0 De Graafschap	3	M	1	Daley Blind scored a hat-trick as a central defender in the 8–0 win against De Graafschap
(Belgium) Amber Tysiak	2021	Belgium 19–0 Armenia	3	F	NT	Amber Tysiak scored three goals, two of which through headers of corner kicks, during Belgium women's national football team 19–0 record win against Armenia as part of its 2023 FIFA Women's World Cup qualification campaign.
(Scotland) Kevin Holt	2023	Partick Thistle 0–5 Dundee United	3	M	2	Kevin Holt, while playing as a central defender, scored a long-range strike from open play, from a corner kick and from a penalty kick in the span of 27 minutes against Partick Thistle on 21 October 2023.
(Romania) Ionut Larie	2023	Farul Constanta 4–1 FC Voluntari	3	M	1	Ionut Larie scored three penalties in that match.
(Tunisia) Yassine Meriah	2023	Espérance sportive de Tunis 6–1 US Tataouine	3	M	1	Yassine Meriah while playing as a central defender, scored a hatrick against US Tataouine on 29th juin 2023, all the goals were penalties.

=== By method ===
==== Hat-trick of free-kicks ====
Player	Year	Score	Goals	Gender	Division	Details
(Italy) Giuseppe Signori	1994	Lazio 3–1 Atalanta	3	M	1	Lazio's captain Giuseppe Signori scored his team's all 3 goals by free-kicks on 10 April 1994 at Stadio Olimpico in the 1993–94 Serie A.
(Scotland) Ray McKinnon	1997	Kilmarnock 2–3 Dundee United	3	M	1	Ray McKinnon scored Dundee United's all 3 away goals by free-kicks on 22 February 1997 in the 1996–97 Scottish Premier Division.
(Greece) Kostas Frantzeskos	1997	PAOK 6–0 Kastoria	3	M	1	Free-kick specialist Kostas Fratzeskos scored 3 free-kicks for PAOK on the last matchday of the 1996–97 Greek first division on 25 May 1997.
(Brazil) Marcos Assunção	1998	Bahia 3–3 Santos	3	M	1	Free-kick specialist Marcos Assunção scored an away hat-trick of free-kicks for Santos against 2nd division Bahia on 1 March 1998 in the first leg of the second round of the 1998 Copa do Brasil.
(Socialist Federal Republic of Yugoslavia) Sinisa Mihajlovic	1998	Lazio 5–2 Sampdoria	3	M	1	Free-kick specialist and centre-back Sinisa Mihajlovic scored a hat-trick of free-kicks on 13 December 1998 against his former club at Stadio Olimpico in the 1998–99 Serie A
(Kuwait) Musaed Neda	2004	Qadsia 3–0 Kuwait SC	3	M	1	He scored three goals from direct free kicks in a game against Kuwait SC in 2003–04 Kuwaiti Premier League.
(Egypt) Shikabala	2010	Zamalek 4–3 Al Ittihad	3	M	1	He scored three goals from direct free kicks in a game against Al Ittihad in 2010–11 Egyptian Premier League.
(Greece) Alexis Nikoulis	2010	Oikonomos Tsaritsani 4–1 Apollon Larissa	3	M	4	Forward Alexis Nikoulis converted 3 free-kicks for Oikonomos Tsaritsani against Apollon Larissa in the Greek 2010-11 fourth division on 10 October 2010, scoring on 30', 78' and 81'. Nikoulis had started his career as goalkeeper for Ampelokipoi.
(Brazil) Cristiano da Silva	2015	Vegalta Sendai 3–3 (3–5 pen.) Kashiwa Reysol	3	M	1	Cristiano da Silva scored all Reysol's goals by free-kick in the quarterfinals 2015 Cup of Japan on 26 December 2015.
(Brazil) Jackson	2021	Nação Canoinhas 3–2 Atlético Catarinense	3	M	6	33-year old winger Jackson scored Nação's all 3 goals by free-kick to help them come from 2–0 behind and win the match, in the 2nd division of the Catarinense championship on 11 August 2021.
(Germany) Anton Heinz	2023	Wuppertaler SV 3–4 Alemannia Aachen	3	M	4	25-year old left winger Heinz scored 3 free-kick goals for Alemannia Aachen in the fourth division (Regionalliga West) match against Wuppertaler SV on 2 December 2023.

==== Hat-trick of own goals ====
Note: Only those who did so unintentionally

Player	Year	Score	Goals	Gender	Division	Details
(New Zealand) Meikayla Moore	2022	United States 5–0 New Zealand	3	F	NT	New Zealand defender Meikayla Moore scored a perfect hat-trick of own goals before being taken off in the 40th minute of their 0–5 loss to the United States in the 2022 SheBelieves Cup. The first two were considered unlucky, particularly the second, for which her involvement was not by any action of her own.

=== Trivia ===
==== Hat-tricks against different goalkeepers in a single match ====
Player	Year	Score	Number	Gender	Division	Details
(England) Alvin Martin	1986	West Ham United 8–1 Newcastle United	3 goalkeepers	M	1	On 21 April 1986 West Ham's Alvin Martin scored his first goal against Newcastle United goalkeeper Martin Thomas, who would end up being replaced by Chris Hedworth due to injury. Martin would then score against Hedworth, who would also be replace by Peter Beardsley near the end of the match, but with still time to play he would score his final goal against Beardsley.

=== By Competition ===
==== Hat-trick in a continental club final ====
Player	Year	Score	Number	Division	Details
(Italy) Carlo Reguzzoni	1934; 1937	Bologna 5–1 Admira Wien; Bologna 4–1 Chelsea	2		Reguzzoni scored 3 goals for Bologna in the second leg of the 1934 Mitropa Cup final (he also scored one in the away leg) and 3 in the 1937 International Paris tournament final.
(Hungary) Ferenc Puskas	1960; 1962	Real Madrid 7–3 Eintracht Frankfurt; Benfica 5–3 Real Madrid	2		Puskas scored 4 goals for Real Madrid in the 1960 European Cup Final (one with a penalty) and 3 in the losing 1962 European Cup Final.
(Spain) Antonio Morales	1912	Barcelona 5–3 Stade Bordelais	1		Morales is the only player to score a hat-trick in a Pyrenees Cup final, having scored 3 goals for Barcelona in the 1912 final.
(Sweden) Gunnar Nordahl	1951	Milan 5–0 Lille	1		Nordahl is the only player to score a hat-trick in a Latin Cup final after scoring three goals in the 1951 final.
(Argentina) Alfredo Di Stefano	1960	Real Madrid CF 7–3 Eintracht Frankfurt	1		Di Stefano scored three goals for Real Madrid in the 1960 European Cup Final at Hampden Park.
(Spain) Vicente Guillot	1962	Valencia 6–2 Barcelona	1		Vicente Guillot scored three goals for Valencia in the 1961–62 Inter-Cities Fairs Cup first leg at Mestalla.
(Spain) Lluís Pujol	1966	Barcelona 4–2 Real Zaragoza	1		Pujol scored three goals for Barcelona in the 1966 Inter-Cities Fairs Cup second leg at La Romareda.
(Italy) Pierino Prati	1969	Milan 4–1 Ajax	1		Prati scored three goals for Milan in the 1969 European Cup Final at Santiago Bernabéu.
(West Germany) Jupp Heynckes	1975	Borussia Mönchengladbach 5–1 Twente	1		Heynckes scored three goals for Borussia Mönchengladbach in the 1975 UEFA Cup final second leg at Diekman Stadion.
(England) Terry McDermott	1977	Liverpool 6–0 Hamburger SV	1		McDermott scored three goals for Liverpool in the second leg of the 1977 European Super Cup at Anfield.
(Brazil) Sergio Ricardo	2000	Al Hilal 2–2 (3–2 a.e.t.) Jubilo Iwata	1		Sergio Ricardo scored all Hilal's 3 goals, including the winner in the extra time in the final of the 1999–2000 Asian Club Championship on 22 April 2000.
(Egypt) Khaled Bebo	2001	Al Ahly SC 3–0 Mamelodi Sundowns	1		Bebo scored all 3 goals in the final of the 2001 CAF Champions League on 21 December 2001.
(Brazil) Thiago Neves	2008	Fluminense 3–1 LDU Quito	1		Thiago Neves is the only player to score a hat-trick in a Copa Libertadores Final final after hitting the net 3 times in the 2nd final of the 2008 Copa Libertadores Finals on 2 July 2008.
(Colombia) Radamel Falcao	2012	Atlético Madrid 4–1 Chelsea	1		Falcao scored three goals for Atlético Madrid in the 2012 UEFA Super Cup at Stade Louis II.
(Norway) Ada Hegerberg	2019	Lyon 4–1 Barcelona	1		Hegerberg scored three goals for Lyon in the 2019 UEFA Women's Champions League final at Groupama Aréna.
(Morocco) Ibtissam Jraïdi	2022	AS FAR 4–0 Mamelodi Sundowns	1		Jraïdi scored three goals for AS FAR in the 2022 CAF Women's Champions League final at Prince Moulay Abdellah Stadium.
(Nigeria) Ademola Lookman	2024	Atalanta 3–0 Bayer Leverkusen	1		Lookman scored three goals for Atalanta in the 2024 UEFA Europa League final at Aviva Stadium. With these three goals, Lookman managed to end the longest unbeaten streak of a European club with 51 matches since the start of European competitions in 1955.

==== Hat-trick in a worldwide or intercontinental final ====
Player	Year	Score	Number	Competition	Details
(Brazil) Pelé	1962	Benfica 2–5 Santos	1	Intercontinental Cup	
(England) Geoff Hurst	1966	England 4–2 West Germany	1	FIFA World Cup	
(North Korea) Kim Song-hui	2006	North Korea U20 3–2 China U20	1	FIFA U-20 Women's World Cup	
(Brazil) Oscar	2011	Brazil U20 3–2 Portugal U20	1	FIFA U-20 World Cup	
(United States) Carli Lloyd	2015	United States 4–2 Japan	1	FIFA Women's World Cup	
(Portugal) Cristiano Ronaldo	2016	Real Madrid 4–2 Kashima Antlers	1	FIFA Club World Cup	
(France) Kylian Mbappé	2022	France 3–3 Argentina	1	FIFA World Cup	

== See also ==
- List of players with the most goals in an association football game
- List of footballers with 500 or more goals
- List of world association football records
- Lists of hat-tricks
