= Football records and statistics in Greece =

Overview of Greek football records

This article concerns football records in Greece and it includes the top flight and lower divisions as well.

== Players ==
=== All-time goalscorers ===
- Thomas Mavros is the all-time top goalscorer in the first tier with 260 goals scored for Panionios and AEK Athens between 1970 and 1991.
- Krzysztof Warzycha is the foreign player with the most goals in the top division, with 244 goals scored for Panathinaikos and second on the overall list.
- Giorgos Sideris is the all-time goalscorer in the Greek Cup with 73 goals. He scored 13 for Atromitos Piraeus and 60 for Olympiacos.
- Ilias Chatzieleftheriou is the all-time top goalscorer in the second division with 152 goals scored for Doxa Dramas, Apollon Kalamarias, Iraklis, Agrotikos Asteras and PAS Giannina between 1967 and 1986.
- Giorgos Kiourkos is the all-time top goalscorer in the third division with 154 goals.
- Dimitris Ziogas holds the record of most goals scored in the lower Greek football divisions, over 750 during his career.
- Nikos Anastopoulos is the all-time top goalscorer of the Greece national football team with 29 goals. He played in 74 international games from 1977 until 1988.
- Dimitris Salpingidis is the all-time Greek top goalscorer in UEFA competitions with 30 goals, scored for PAOK and Panathinaikos (1999–2016).

=== Awards ===
- Demis Nikolaidis and Nikos Liberopoulos have won the Best Greek Player award 3 times. Nikolaidis won it in 1997, 1998 and 2002 as a player of AEK Athens and Liberopoulos in 2000 playing for Panathinaikos and in 2006, 2007 playing for AEK Athens. The award was established by PSAP in 1992.
- Antonis Nikopolidis won the Best goalkeeper award 8 times (2000, 2002, 2003, 2004, 2005, 2006, 2008, 2009). The award was established in 1997.
- Giorgos Theodoridis and Nikos Pourtoulidis have won the second division Best Player award 2 times. Theodoridis in 2010, 2011 playing for Panetolikos and Portoulidis in 2014, 2015 playing for Iraklis.
- Giorgos Sourlis and Giorgos Zacharopoulos are the only footballers to have won the best player award in both second and third division.
- Krzysztof Warzycha has won the Best foreign player award a record 5 times (1993, 1994, 1995, 1997, 1998).
- Kostas Nestoridis and Antonis Antoniadis are the only players to win the first division top goalscorer award five times. In Nestoridis' case he won it 5 consecutive times between 1959 and 1963.
- Giorgos Sideris won the Greek Cup top scorer award a record 5 times (1962, 1963, 1965, 1968, 1969), playing for Olympiacos. Second is Dimitris Saravakos with 4 wins.
- Three players won the first division topscorer award and also the second division award. These are: Alexis Alexandris, Antonis Antoniadis and Fanis Gekas. Alexandris won both awards more than once.
- Five players have won second division top goalscorer award from 2 times: Kostas Davourlis (1967, 1969), Ilias Solakis (2007, 2010), Kostas Kottakis (1987, 1988), Alexis Alexandris (1990, 1991), and Nikos Kouskounas (2016, 2017).
- Ilias Solakis is the only player to win the top goalscorer award in the second (2007, 2010), third (1998) and fourth division (1991).
- Davor Jakovljević won the Gamma Ethniki top goalscorer award a record 3 times between 1995 and 1997, playing for Halkida and Ethnikos Asteras.
- Dimitris Beis won the Delta Ethniki top goalscorer award 2 times (2002, 2003) playing for Messolonghi.

=== Youngest players' records ===
- Ntinos Pontikas holds the record of the youngest player to score a hat-trick in Greek football, at the age of 14 years, 6 months and 18 days, achieving that in his debut match Ampelokipoi - Haravgi (4–3), in the fifth tier, on 21 September 1996. His feat also remains a world record.
- Charis Sofianos holds the record of the youngest footballer to score in the first tier at 15 years, 11 months and 1 day. He scored in his debut match, Panionios - Aris (2–0), on 26 December 1977.
- Dimitrios Ziogas holds the record for the youngest player to win the topscorer award in any Greek league, at 15 years and 7 months in the second division of the Thessaly league (sixth level on the pyramid), in the 1996–97 season, scoring 35 goals.
- Kostas Tsampas holds the record of the youngest footballer to play in the first tier at 14 years, 3 months and 4 days. He made his debut in the Panachaiki – Apollon Smyrnis match (0–0) on 26 December 1977.
- Panagiotis Lygkas became the youngest scorer in the third division at 15 years, 4 months and 3 days. He scored his team's fourth goal in the match Souli Paramythias – Grevena Aerata (4–0), on 13 January 2019.
- Dimitris Papadopoulos was the youngest player to feature in the second division playing his first match at 14 years old for Ergotelis in 1964.
- Konstantinos Karetsas is the youngest player to score for the Greece national football team, at 17 years, 4 months and 4 days in his second game Scotland - Greece (0–3), on 23 March 2025. He broke Sotiris Ninis' record from 2008.

=== Oldest players' records ===
- Tasos Mitropoulos holds the record of the oldest scorer in the first division at 39 years, 7 months and 29 days in the match Veria - AEK Athens (1–0), on 21 May 1997. Veria's captain broke the record of Lefter Küçükandonyadis since 1964.
- Serbian goalkeeper Milan Sevo became the oldest player to feature in the Greek topflight in the match AO Trikala - OFI 0-0, on 26 March 2000. He was 40 years old, 6 months and 11 days playing for Trikala.
- Kostas Chalkias holds the record of the oldest player to feature in the Beta Ethniki three days before his 44th birthday in the match Aiginiakos – Panachaiki (0–2) on 27 May 2018. The Panachaiki's goalkeeper was 43 years, 11 months and 28 days.
- Kostas Nebegleras holds the record of the oldest player to feature in Gamma Ethniki. Nebegleras, two weeks before his 43rd birthday played in the match AO Sellana – Achilleas Farsala (1-0), on 1 April 2018. He was 42 years, 11 months and 17 days.
- Thomas Mavros was the oldest player to win the first division top scorer award in 1990 at the age of 36. He scored 22 goals for Panionios.
- Panagiotis Kyparissis holds the record of the oldest scorer in the second tier at 41 years, 5 months and 2 days in the match Kerkyra – Vataniakos (4–3), on 12 January 2014.
- Giorgos Zacharopoulos was the oldest player to win the third division top scorer award in 2009 at the age of 38. He scored 24 goals for Fostiras.
- Ilias Manikas is the oldest player to score a hat-trick in a Greek football competition, on April 19, 2026, at the age of 45 years and 11 months, in the Larisa FCA second division, in the match Omonoia - Mytikas Kalyvion (1-5).

=== Appearances ===
- Mimis Domazos holds the record of the player with most appearances in the first division having recorded 536 matches between 1959 and 1980. He played for Panathinaikos and AEK Athens.
- Giorgos Koudas holds the record for the most appearances with a single club in the top flight, having played 504 matches for PAOK between 1963 and 1984.
- Matías Iglesias is the foreign player with most appearances in the top flight, having played for AEL, Atromitos, Asteras Tripolis and Ionikos.
- Konstantinos Nebegleras has played the most games in any professional division during his career in Greek football (top three divisions). He has recorded 688 appearances from 1993 until 2018. He featured for AEL, Aris, Iraklis, Atromitos, Paniliakos, and Achilleas Farsala.
- Kostas Nebegleras holds the record of the player with most appearances in the Greek Cup with 89 games. His last cup match was in the 2015–16 season. Athanasios Kostoulas is second on the list with 82 appearances.
- Christos Giatzitzopoulos holds the record of the most seasons played in the second tier (17) playing for Naoussa and Veria. Giannis Mandrekas who played for Proodeftiki and Ionikos is second on the list with 16 seasons (1972–1988).
- Antonis Nikopolidis is the all-time leading player in appearances in UEFA club competitions, with 104. He represented Panathinaikos and Olympiacos from 1990 until 2009.
- Giorgos Karagounis has recorded more international appearances than any other Greek player. He played for the Greece national football team 139 times from 1999 until 2014.

=== Players with most trophies won ===
- Predrag Djordjevic is the football player who has won the most topflight championships (12), all with Olympiacos. Antonis Nikopolidis is second on the list and the only Greek player to have celebrated 11 leagues: 5 with Panathinaikos and 6 with Olympiacos.
- Ilias Rosidis, Thanasis Bebis and Antonios Nikopolidis won the Greek Cup a record 9 times.
- Dimitris Saravakos is the player who won the most Super Cups (3). He won two with Panathinaikos (1988, 1993) and one with AEK Athens (1996).
- Lakis Petropoulos won the most league titles (7), in the Athens FCA, all with Panathinaikos (1952–1957, 1959).
- Giorgos Darivas won the most Panhellenic championships (7) which were held until 1959. He won them all playing for Olympiacos (1948, 1951, 1954, 1955, 1956, 1957, 1958).
- Giorgos Darivas won the most league titles (11), in the Piraeus FCA, all with Olympiacos.

=== International accolades ===
- Mimis Papaioannou was voted by IFFHS as the best Greek player of the 20th century (2000).
- Vasilis Hatzipanagis was voted by the Hellenic Football Federation (2004) as the best Greek player from 1954 until 2003. The award was part of the UEFA Jubilee Awards.
- Antonis Antoniadis is the only Greek player to win the top scorer award in the European Cup. He scored 10 goals for Panathinaikos in the 1970–71 campaign.
- Theodoros Zagorakis is the only Greek player to win a Best player award in a major UEFA competition (UEFA Euro 2004).
- Two Greek players have been nominated twice for the Ballon d'Or award by France Football. Mimis Domazos (1969, 1971) and Dimitris Saravakos (1987, 1991), both players of Panathinaikos. The following players were nominated once: Giorgos Sideris (1969), Vasilis Hatzipanagis (1983), Stelios Manolas (1993), Nikos Machlas (1998), Antonis Nikopolidis (2004), Traianos Dellas (2004), Angelos Charisteas (2004) and Thodoris Zagorakis (2004).
- Antonis Antoniadis, Giorgos Sideris, Thomas Mavros and Vasilis Dimitriadis are the four Greek players to win the European Silver Shoe award. Antoniadis scored 39 goals for Panathinaikos in 1971–72 and finished behind Gerd Muller who scored 40. Sideris scored 35 goals for Olympiacos in 1968–69, Mavros 31 goals for AEK Athens in 1978–79 finished behind Kees Kist who scored 33 and Dimitriadis 33 goals in 1992–93 finished behind Ally McCoist who scored 34.
- Georgios Dedes, Nikos Anastopoulos, and Krzysztof Warzycha won the European Bronze Shoe award. Dedes scored 28 goals for Panionios (1970–71), Anastopoulos 29 for Olympiacos (1982–83), and Warzycha 32 for Panathinaikos (1997–98)

=== Greek players abroad ===
- Kostas Negrepontis was the first Greek footballer to play abroad. The Constantinople-born striker was transferred to French CASG Paris in 1923 playing there for 2 seasons.
- Kostas Choumis was the first Greek player to move to a foreign club on a transfer fee. His transfer from Ethnikos Piraeus to FC Venus București in 1936 was a club and national record (1 million drachmas) and lasted for decades.
- Nikos Machlas is the only Greek player to win the European Golden Shoe. He achieved it after scoring 34 goals for SBV Vitesse in Eredivisie.
- Georgios Samaras is the Greek player who spent the most seasons abroad (18). The Heraklion-born forward joined SC Heerenveen in 2000 and ended his career with Samsunspor in 2018.
- Nikos Machlas, Fanis Gekas, Giorgos Giakoumakis and Anastasios Douvikas are the four Greek players who have won a top scorer award in a foreign league. Machlas scored 34 goals in 1997-98 Eredivisie, Gekas scored 20 goals in 2006-07 Bundesliga, Giakoumakis scored 26 goals in 2020–21 Eredivisie plus 13 goals in 2021–22 Scottish Premiership and Douvikas scored 19 goals in 2022/2023 Eredivisie.
- Charalampos Kostoulas is currently the most expensive player in history. His transfer from Olympiacos to Brighton & Hove Albion cost 35 million in 2025.

=== Miscellaneous ===
- Stelios Manolas is the longest-serving player for one club during his career. He played for AEK Athens for 20 years (1978–1998) and 24 in total including his youth years (1974–1998).
- Vasilis Hatzipanagis is the player who scored most goals from a direct corner kick during his career in Greece with Iraklis (7). He had previously scored two in the Soviet Top League.
- Kostas Frantzeskos has scored the most goals from free kicks (57 in total - 43 in the league). He also remains 11th on the world list and has scored a hat-trick of free kicks (PAOK – Kastoria 6–0, 25 May 1997).
- Sakis Tsiolis and Giannis Goumas are the only players to win both the Greek Cup and the Greek Amateur Cup. Goumas won the national cup twice (1995, 2004) and the Amateurs cup once (1994) with Panathinaikos. Tsiolis won first the amateur cup with Anagennisi Karditsa (1981) and the national cup with AEL (1985).
- Three players have managed to score a hat-trick for 2 consecutive match days in Alpha Ethniki: Georgios Kamaras in 1961–62, Antonis Antoniadis in 1973-74 and Konstantinos Mitroglou in 2013–14.
- Alexis Gavrilopoulos scored a hat-trick with headers on 7 October 2007 in the match Panachaiki - Thiva F.C. (3-0) in Gamma Ethniki.
- Seven players have been called up to the national team while playing for a second division club. Kostas Davourlis (Panachaiki, 1969), Petros Mantalos (AEK Athens, 2014), Nikos Kalabakas (Pierikos, 1975), Tasos Strantzalis (Doxa Drama, 1977), and Vangelis Kalogeropoulos (Panserraikos, 1989), Dimitris Giannoulis (Norwich City, 2021/2022/2023) and George Baldock (Sheffield United, 2022/2023).
- Mimis Domazos holds the record of the longest-serving captain of the Greece national team. He wore the armband for 9 years (1970–79), representing Panathinaikos and AEK Athens.
- Takis Oikonomopoulos kept a clean sheet for 1088 minutes for Panathinaikos during their 1964-65 undefeated campaign.
- Giannis Antoniadis holds the record of the most goals scored in one season in top five divisions. He scored 57 goals for Orfeas Eleftheroupoli in the 1979–80 season in the fifth tier of Greek football.
- Demis Nikolaidis is the only player of the Greek first division to score 4 goals in an UEFA match. His feat was recorded on 26 October 2000 in the match AEK Athens – Herfølge (5–0) in the 2000–01 UEFA Cup.
- Antonis Antoniadis holds the record of most goals scored in one season in the top division. He scored 39 goals for Panathinaikos in 1971–72.
- Ilias Manikas scored the fastest hat-trick in Greek football on 6 December 2011. He completed his treble in just 4 minutes: 5th, 7th and 9th minute of the Asteras Magoulas - Zakynthos F.C. game in the third tier.
- Argentine midfielder Diego Romano became the oldest ever foreign player to feature in the Greek Cup, on 25 September 2022 in the match between Aris Voulas and Nafpaktiakos Asteras (0–1), at the age of 42 years and 6 months.
- Brothers Thanasis Dimopoulos, Christos Dimopoulos and Spyros Dimopoulos scored on the same day, in the Greek first division on 2 February 1992, which is also a world record. Christos scored twice for Athinaikos against Panserraikos (2–0), Thanasis scored once for Iraklis in an away game against Panionios (2–2) and youngest brother Spyros for Ethnikos Piraeus in their win over Apollon Smyrnis at Karaiskakis Stadium.
- Goalkeeper Vasilis Tzekas holds the record for the player with the most Amateur local Cup finals featured. He played in 10 Cup finals of the Thessaly Football Clubs Association (2000, 2001, 2002, 2004, 2005, 2006, 2007, 2008, 2009, 2010).
- Ntinos Pontikas is the player with the longest gap between appearances in the same league in Greek football, with his 2023–24 return in Larissa FCA after 26 seasons. He also holds the record for the longest gap between goals for the same association league, in 2024–25, after 27 seasons.
- Vangelis Roukas holds the record for most goals scored in one season in any Greek league. He scored 67 goals in the 2014–15 season, in the second division of the Trikala Association - fifth level on the pyramid.
- Fanis Gekas is the only Greek player to have received the top goalscorer award in the top division (2006), the second division (2005), the regional championship (1998) and also a foreign league (Bundesliga 2007).
- Ntinos Pontikas had the longest gap between spells for the same club, with Toxotis Larissa, after 28 seasons, for both youth and senior teams (1995–96 to 2024–25). He surpassed worldwide Ludovic Giuly's feat for amateur French club ACSMO Chasselay with 26 seasons (1986–87 to 2013–14).
- There have been only 4 players who did not play for Athens or Thessaloniki clubs and won the top scorer award in Alpha Ethniki: Dimitrios Papadopoulos (OFI – 1977), Imre Boda (Olympiacos Volos - 1989), Esteban Solari (AO Xanthi - 2014) and Jeronimo Barrales (Asteras Tripoli - 2015).
- Only three players have managed to score for 8 consecutive games in Alpha Ethniki: Giorgos Sideris (Olympiacos 1964–65 and 1968–69), Kostas Nikolaidis (AEK Athens 1967–68) and Demis Nikolaidis (AEK Athens 1997–98).

== Coaches ==
- Dušan Bajević won the Best manager award 8 times (1993, 1994, 1996, 1998, 1999, 2001, 2003, 2008) representing 4 clubs: AEK Athens, Olympiacos, PAOK and Aris.
- Dušan Bajević won the first division title a record 8 times (1989, 1992, 1993, 1994, 1997, 1998, 1999, 2005).
- Stjepan Bobek and Razvan Lucescu have won the first division title undefeated. Bobek with Panathinaikos in 1963–64 and Lucescu with PAOK in 2018–19.
- Periklis Amanatidis holds the record of most championship won (10) in the top four divisions of the Greek championship. He won 8 titles in third division with Trikala (twice), Olympiacos Volos, Lamia, Aiginiakos, Niki Volos, Agrotikos Asteras, Poseidon Neon Poron and also 2 in the fourth division with Poseidon Neon Poron and AS Iraklis Ampelokipoi.
- Dušan Bajević has won a record 4 Greek Cups (1996, 1999, 2001, 2005).
- Dušan Bajević is the only coach in Greek football to lead 4 teams to the Cup final: AEK Athens (1994, 1995, 1996), Olympiacos (1999, 2005), PAOK (2001) and Aris (2008).
- Dušan Bajević is the only coach to win the championship, the Greek Cup, the Super Cup (1989) and the League Cup (1989).
- Georgios Paraschos holds the record of the sportsman served Greek football the longest (50 years) as both a player and coach.
- Georgios Paraschos has coached a first division club for 24 seasons, more than any other coach, breaking Giannis Mantzourakis' record with 23.
- Dušan Bajević has coached 647 games in the first division which is a panhellenic record. Antonis Georgiadis is second on the list with 586.
- Babis Tennes has achieved a record 6 promotions to Alpha Ehniki.
- Periklis Amanatidis is the coach with the most victories in Gamma Ethniki.
- Eugène Gerards was the longest serving coach in a first division club, coaching OFI from 1985 until 2000.
- Dan Georgiadis was the first Greek coach to manage a team abroad, taking over Peruvian Sport Boys in 1957. Georgiadis coached 10 football clubs abroad: 2 teams in Peru, 2 in Argentina, 1 in Bolivia, 1 in Chile, 1 in Paraguay, 1 in Spain and 2 in Switzerland. He also coached 5 national teams: Haiti, Peru, Greece, Bolivia and Venezuela.
- Giorgos Kyrgias holds the record for the longest-serving coach for a Greek club. He has been at the helm of fifth division team Diogenis Larissa FC since 1987, with the 2023–24 season being his 37th consecutive. Giannis Tsemperidis follows with 30 consecutive seasons at the helm of AS Dailakis, since 1994.
- Alketas Panagoulias and Dan Georgiadis were the two Greek coaches to manage a national team other than Greece. Panagoulias apart from Greece also coached USA (1983–1985).

== Clubs ==
=== Most championships won ===
- Olympiacos have won the first division league a record 48 times, since 1927.
- Panachaiki have won the second division a record 6 times.
- Edessaikos (1977, 1983, 1987, 1989) and Panetolikos (1973, 1985, 1992, 1996) have won the Gamma Ethniki a record 4 times.
- Fostiras (1991, 1994, 2001, 2007, 2012), Kozani (1995, 1997, 2004, 2009, 2013), Lamia (1990, 1994, 2000, 2004, 2013) have won the Delta Ethniki a record 5 times.
- Aris and AEK Athens are the only clubs to have won all the top three divisions in Greek football and also their association leagues

=== Most cups won ===
- Olympiacos have won the Greater Greece Cup a record 3 times (1969, 1972, 1976).
- Olympiacos have won the Greek Cup a record 29 times.
- Olympiacos have won the Greek Super Cup a record 5 times.
- Olympiacos have won the Easter Cup a record 11 times.
- Olympiacos have won the Christmas Cup 11 times.
- AEK Athens have won the only Greek League Cup competition (1989).
- Aiolikos (1982, 2002) and Foivos Kremasti (1972, 2013) have won the Greek Football Amateur Cup 2 times, more than any other club.

=== Most appearances ===
- Panathinaikos, Olympiacos and PAOK have more participations than any club in the first division (67) since 1959. These three clubs have never been relegated.
- Apollon Kalamarias and Athens Kallithea are the clubs with the most participations (37) in the second division.
- Kozani have the most participations in Gamma Ethniki (23).
- AO Karditsa have the most participations in the now defunct Delta Ethniki (28). Achaiki F.C. are second on the list with 26.
- Olympiakos Nicosia, AEL Limassol, APOEL, EPA Larnaca, Omonia Nicosia are the five clubs from Cyprus who have played in the Greek top flight.

=== Greek clubs in international competitions ===
- Olympiacos are the club with the most participations, wins and goals in European competitions (376, 148, 490).
- Olympiacos are the only club in European football to win two European competitions in the same season (2024), the UEFA Youth League for the youth team and the UEFA Europa Conference League for the senior team.
- Panathinaikos and Olympiacos are the only Greek clubs to have played in the final of a European competition, Panathinaikos in the final of the European Cup (1971) and Olympiacos in the final of the Europa Conference League (2024). Panathinaikos also reached the semi-finals twice: in 1985 and 1996
- Six Greek clubs have won the Balkans Cup: Olympiacos (1963), Panionios (1971), Panathinaikos (1977), Edessaikos (1993), Iraklis (1985), OFI (1989). PAS Giannina (1994) and AEK Athens (1967) finished runners-ups. Panionios Smirnis are also the only club to play in 2 Balkan Cup finals (1971, 1986).
- AEK Athens are the only Greek club to have reached the UEFA Cup semi-finals (1977).
- AEK Athens are the club with most appearances (2) in the UEFA Cup Winners' Cup quarter-finals (1997 and 1998).
- Panathinaikos are the only Greek club to have played in the Intercontinental Cup (1971).
- Olympiacos are the first Greek club to win an international trophy, the Balkans Cup in 1963.

=== Regional championships (until 1959) ===
- Olympiacos have won 25 regional championships, more than any other club.
- Aris have won the most Macedonia FCA championships (12).
- Panathinaikos have won a record 17 Athens FCA championships. They also won 2 more after 1959 (in 1993 and in 1994) fielding their amateur team.
- Panachaiki hold the record for the most Achaea FCA league championships (14). They also won two more after 1959 (in 1961 and 1962).
- Niki Volos hold the record for the most Thessaly FCA league championships (12). They also won two more after 1959 (in 1960 and 1961).
- OFI won the most Heraklion FCA league championships (13). They also won three more after 1959 (in 1960, 1961 and 1962).
- Apollon Smyrnis won the most Smyrna championships (1917, 1918, 1919, 1920, 1922).
- Doxa Drama won the most inter-regional tournaments (3) to qualify to the Panhellenic Championship (1957, 1958, 1959). Doxa also reached two more play-off finals (1955, 1956).
- Anagennisi Arta have won a record 4 FCA winners' championships (1969, 1976, 2000, 2014), thus earning promotion to Delta Ethniki.

=== Clubs with most Greek players in national team tournaments ===
- 1906 Intercalated Olympic Games: Ethnikos Athens (10).
- 1920 Olympic Games: Apollon Smyrnis (4).
- 1952 Olympic Games: AEK Athens and Olympiacos (6).
- 1980 Euro Championship: PAOK (5).
- 1994 World Cup: Panathinaikos (6).
- 2004 Euro Championship: AEK Athens, Panathinaikos (5).
- 2004 Olympic Games: Olympiacos (4).
- 2010 World Cup: Panathinaikos (5).
- 2014 World Cup: PAOK (4).

=== Miscellaneous ===
- Olympiacos have won a record 82 national titles (48 league titles, 29 Cups and 5 Super Cups).
- Olympiacos have won a record 19 doubles.
- Five clubs won the most Greek championships between 1906 and 1927 before Hellenic Football Federation took over. Those championships were organized either by SEGAS, YMCA or the three main local associations and were considered panhellenic. Iraklis (1914, 1915, 1927), Aris (1923, 1924, 1926), Olympiacos (1925, 1926, 1927), Goudi Athens (1908, 1910, 1912) and Panathinaikos (1925, 1926, 1927).
- Goudi Athens won the most championships (1908, 1910, 1912) organised by SEGAS
- Olympiacos holds the longest unbeaten league record of 58 consecutive games (from matchday 3 of the 1971-72 season to matchday 18 of the 1973-74 season).
- Panathinaikos and PAOK are the only two clubs that have won the first division title undefeated. Panathinaikos won it in 1963–64 (24 wins, 6 draws) and PAOK in 2018–19 (26 wins, 4 draws).
- PAOK, Aris and Panathinaikos are the only Greek clubs that have won both the Greek Cup and the Amateurs Cup. PAOK Amateurs won the latter in 1975, Aris in 1985 and Panathinaikos in 1994.
- Panathinaikos holds the record for the team with most average tickets sold in a season. It was in 1985–86 with the club from Athens averaging 44.972 per game at OAKA Stadium.
- AEL are the only club that have won the Greek Cup (1985, 2007) and the Gamma Ethniki Cup (2014).
- Ethnikos Piraeus and Kastoria are the only clubs that have won the Greek national Cup, and the regional cup. Ethnikos Piraeus won the Greek Cup once (1933), and the regional cup (2014) Kastoria won the Greek Cup also once (1980) and the regional cup 3 times (2001, 2002, 2017).
- Ethnikos Piraeus are the only club to play in the final match of 3 out 4 Greek Cup competitions (national, amateur, third tier and regional): Greek Cup (1933), Gamma Ethniki Cup (2015) and regional cup (2013, 2014).

== Associations ==
- Macedonia Football Clubs Association and Athens Football Clubs Association are the associations with the most winning clubs (5) in the Greek Football Amateur Cups.
- Piraeus Football Clubs Association have won the Cities' Cup (1924–1957) a record 13 times.
- Athens FCA is the association with the most clubs participated in the top three divisions of Greek football.
- Piraeus FCA is the association with the most championships won in Alpha Ethniki (47), all by Olympiacos.
- Athens FCA is the association with the most Greek Cups won (35). Panathinaikos 18, AEK Athens 15, and Panionios 2.
- Athens FCA is the association with the most Super Cups won (5). Panathinaikos 3 and AEK Athens 2.
- The longest serving president of a local Association is Thanasis Boutziolis who has been elected chairman of Trikala FCA since 1996 (26 consecutive years).

== Stadiums ==
- Karaiskakis Stadium (former Velodrome) is the stadium hosted the most matches (1512) in the first tier since 1959. Ethnikos Piraeus (1959–1999) and Olympiacos (1959-present) are the main clubs who have played in the stadium.
- Athens Olympic Stadium remains the biggest stadium hosted football games in Greece since its opening in 1982 (72,000 capacity)
- Leoforos Alexandras Stadium is the oldest football ground in Greece (opened in 1922) and it was the biggest (24,000 capacity) until Toumba Stadium opened in 1957.
- The record of highest attendance in a European match in Greece occurred on 3 November 1982, in the Olympiacos - Hamburger SV (0–4), with 75,263 tickets sold at OAKA Stadium, in Athens.
- The record of highest attendance in the Greek league occurred in May 1986 during the Panathinaikos - AEK Athens (0–0) game on the last matchday of the seasons, with 74,473 tickets sold at OAKA Stadium, in Athens.
- The record of highest attendance in the Greek Cup took place on 28 May 1986, in the Olympiacos – Panathinaikos Final (0–4), with 74,004 tickets sold at Athens Olympic Stadium.
