= Ilias Manikas =

Greek footballer

Personal information
- Full name: Ilias Manikas
- Date of birth: 11 May 1980 (age 46)
- Place of birth: Katerini, Greece
- Position: Striker

Team information
- Current team: Pierikos

Senior career*
Years	Team	Apps	(Gls)
1997–2001	Pierikos	56	(7)
2001–2002	AE Didymoteixou		
2002–2005	Paniliakos	75	(16)
2005	Atromitos	6	(0)
2006	Levadiakos	5	(0)
2006	Apollon Kalamarias	6	(0)
2007	Pierikos	11	(4)
2007–2008	Thrasyvoulos	28	(2)
2008–2010	Panetolikos	28	(7)
2010–2011	Rodos	24	(9)
2011–2012	Asteras Magoula	19	(5)
2012	Vataniakos	9	(7)
2013–2015	Pierikos	54	(11)
- * Club domestic league appearances and goals

Ilias Manikas (Greek: Ηλίας Μανίκας; born 11 May 1980 in Katerini) is a Greek former professional footballer. He holds the record for the fastest hat-trick in the history of Greek football.

== Career ==
Manikas started his career from Pierikos in 1997 and remained for 4 years. In 2002 he signed for Paniliakos. Between 2008 and 2010, he played for Panetolikos. After his contract expired, he signed with Rodos F.C.

He returned to Pierikos in 2007 and 2013 and later was appointed as technical director. Since then he has joined lower leagues clubs.

=== Record ===
On 5 December 2011 Manikas scored the fastest hat-trick in the history of Greek football, after scoring 3 times within 4 minutes during the Asteras Magoula - Zakynthos (3–1) in Gamma Ethniki.
