= Georgios Kolovos =

Greek footballer

Personal information
- Full name: Georgios Kolovos
- Date of birth: 9 October 1965 (age 61)
- Place of birth: Larissa, Greece
- Height: 1.88 m (6 ft 2 in)
- Position: Forward

Youth career
- 1979-1981: Ampelokipoi Larissa

Senior career*
Years	Team	Apps	(Gls)
1981–1985	Apollon Larissa		
1985–1989	AEL		
1989–1991	Toxotis		
1996–1999	Ampelokipoi Larissa		
- * Club domestic league appearances and goals

Georgios Kolovos (Greek: Γεώργιος Κολοβός; born 9 October 1965) is a Greek former professional football player who played as a forward.

== Club career ==
Kolovos started his career from Apollon Larissa playing in Delta Ethniki. In the summer of 1985 he was transferred to the 1985 Greek Cup winners AEL alongside another young talent, Vassilis Karapialis, and under experienced Polish coach Andrzej Strejlau. Kolovos stayed at AEL for three years becoming a Greek champion in 1988.
The following year, he was released by the club after not being in Marcin Bochynek's plans and he signed for fourth division side Toxotis. He subsequently joined Ampelokipoi Larissa playing with the club in Delta Ethniki under coach Nikos Vlachoulis and the Larissa FCA league alongside his former AEL teammate Babis Ntosas and future Greece international Vangelis Moras.
