= Dimitrios Ziogas =

Greek footballer

Personal information
- Date of birth: 9 November 1981 (age 44)
- Place of birth: Volos, Greece

Team information
- Current team: Pyrasos Nea Anchialos

Youth career
- 1993–1997: APOV Volos FC

Senior career*
Years	Team	Apps	(Gls)
1997–2001	Niki Volos		
2001–2003	Asteras Ryzomylos		
2003–2005	Androutsos Gravias		
2005–2006	Anagennisi Karditsas		
2006–2007	Enosi Poros-Galatas		
2007–2008	Asteras Iteas		
2008	Niki Polygyros		
2009	Anagennisi Giannitsa		
2009	A.O. Nea Ionia		
2010	Saronikos Aigina		
2011	Enosis Aspropyrgos		
2012–2013	A.O. Karditsas		
2013–2014	Sarakinos Volos		
2014–2015	AE Leontari		
2015–2016	AE Diminiou		
2016–2017	Dafni Livanaton (player-manager)		
2017–2018	AO Agnantero		
2018–2019	Achilleas Farsala		
2019	AO Agnantero		
2019–2021	Pyrasos Nea Anchialos		

Managerial career
- 2016: Skiathos FC
- 2016-2017: Dafni Livanaton
- 2021-2022: Keravnos Vathikoilos FC
- 2022-2023: Apollon Kanalion
- 2023-: Chloe FC
- * Club domestic league appearances and goals

Dimitrios Ziogas (Greek: Δημήτριος Ζιώγας; born 9 November 1981) is a Greek former football player and currently a manager of Chloe FC. He holds the record of most goals scored by a footballer in lower Greek football divisions, scoring over 1.000 in official and friendly matches and has been awarded for his feat by the Greek Football Federation. Ziogas is also one of the youngest players ever worldwide to have scored a hat-trick and the youngest to win a top scorer award in any league in Greek football.

== Biography ==
Ziogas started his career from the Olympiacos Volos youth section at the age of 5. His idols were prolific scorers Gerd Muller and Romario. In 1996 he was released and joined newly founded APO Volos in the third division of Thessaly Football Clubs Association -7th tier at the time- where he immediately became a regular and was crowned the league's top scorer in 1996–97 at just the age of 16. Though his family were Olympiacos Volos supporters, in the summer of 1997 he was signed by crosstown rivals Niki Volos, a Greek second division club coached by Vasilios Antoniadis. He stayed at Niki Volos for 5 seasons winning the Thessaly Cup but with limited playing time in Beta Ethniki and Gamma Ethniki.
Once he joined Asteras Rizomylos in 2002, his career took off with him scoring numerous goals and playing for lower division clubs in Delta Ethniki and amateur leagues for almost 20 years. He had also been player-manager after briefly quitting football in 2016, to return in 2018 and finally retire in 2021.

== Records ==
Ziogas has scored 750 goals in approximately 700 official games in Greek football which is a national record. He has won 19 league titles playing for 22 clubs, while he has scored 6 bicycle kicks in one season, and 5 goals during a first-half getting the nickname Greek Lewandowski.
During the 2007–08 season he scored for 21 matches in a row in the 5th tier Argolida Football Clubs Association league. The previous season 2006–07 in the same league he had scored 11 goals in one game, his career high. Ziogas is considered one of the most prolific scorers in the history of Greek football including all tiers.
