= José María Benguria =

Spanish footballer

Personal information
- Full name: José María de Benguria y Berreteaga
- Date of birth: 15 March 1904
- Place of birth: Plentzia, Spain
- Place of death: Spain
- Position: Defender

Senior career*
Years	Team	Apps	(Gls)
1920–1921	Athletic Bilbao		
1921–1922	Atlético Madrid		
1923–1924	Real Madrid		
1924–1925	Sociedad Gimnástica		
1925	Athletic Bilbao		
1926–1928	Real Madrid		
- * Club domestic league appearances and goals

José María de Benguria y Berreteaga (15 March 1904 – unknown) was a Spanish footballer who played as a defender for Athletic Bilbao, Atlético Madrid, and Real Madrid in the 1920s.

== Early life and education ==
José María de Benguria was born in Plentzia, Biscay, on 15 March 1904, (Note: Some sources wrongly state that he was born in Gorliz, Biscay.) as the son of Juan Pablo Benguría Elorriaga Ybinaga Arrola (1854–1932) and Petra Agustina Berreteaga Borica Barasorda Ugarte (1861–1934).

Benguria attended the Instituto Cardenal Cisneros in Madrid from 1922 to 1924.

== Career ==
Benguria began his football career in 1920, aged 16, with Athletic Bilbao, and after one season he joined its subsidiary team, Atlético Madrid, with whom he also played only one season, as he then joined its city rivals, Real Madrid. After a short stint at Sociedad Gimnástica, he returned to Athletic Bilbao in the middle of the 1924–25 season, making his debut with the club's first team on 12 April, in a friendly match against Espanyol, as both of them had failed to qualify for the 1925 Copa del Rey; Bilbao won 3–0.

In 1926, Benguria returned to Real Madrid for one more season, scoring a total of 8 goals in 13 official matches, including a remarkable 8 goals in just six Copa del Rey matches, including a 5-goal haul in a 9–4 victory against Extremeño in the group phase. He also helped Madrid win the 1926–27 Centro Championship.

== Honours ==
Real Madrid

- Centro Championship:
  - Champions (1): 1926–27

== See also ==
- List of footballers who achieved hat-trick records

== See also ==
- List of Real Madrid CF players
