= Pablo Pombo =

Spanish footballer

Personal information
- Full name: Pablo Pombo Quintana
- Date of birth: 13 June 1916
- Place of birth: Santander, Spain
- Date of death: 15 January 2001 (aged 84)
- Place of death: Ciudad Real, Spain
- Position: Midfielder

Youth career
- 1933: Racing de Santander

Senior career*
Years	Team	Apps	(Gls)
1931–1932	CD Paloma		
1932–1933	Santoña CF		
1933–1939	Racing de Santander		
1939	Sevilla		
1939–1945	Racing de Santander		
1945–1946	Cartagena		
1946	Xerez Club		
1946–1949	Cádiz		
1949–1954	Xerez CD		
- * Club domestic league appearances and goals

Pablo Pombo Quintana (13 June 1916 – 15 January 2001) was a Spanish footballer who played as a midfielder for Racing de Santander, Sevilla, and Cádiz in the 1930s and 1940s. He is best known for being both the youngest player and the youngest scorer in Racing's history.

== Early life and family ==
Pablo Pombo was born in Santander, Cantabria, on 13 June 1916, at 9PM, into a vast family of 10 siblings from the marriage of Antonio Pombo Labat and Casilda Quintana Trueba. He was baptized in the parish of Santa Lucía three days later by the parish priest Don Sixto Córdova Oña.

Two of his brothers, José Felipe and Chuchi, also played football for Racing de Santander. Furthermore, Juan Pombo Ybarra, a distant relative, who gained great popularity when he made his first flight from Santander to Madrid in 1913, was president of Racing de Santander in 1920–21, and then one of his brothers, Fernando Pombo Ybarra, followed on his footsteps by presiding over Racing on two occasions (1928–30 and 1930–33). Fernando was replaced by José María Cossío Ilmo, a relative of his on his mother's side, and finally, one of Juan's sons, Rafael Pombo Alonso-Pesquera, was also Racing's president in 1940–42.

== Playing career ==
=== First steps ===
After spending his childhood in Villa Piquío del Sardinero, Pombo went to study at the Colegio de La Salle in Santoña, where his first teams were CD Paloma and Santoña CF in the early 1930s, aged 15. In early 1933, the 16-year-old Pombo was signed by Racing de Santander, then in the Spanish first division, through the mediation and influence of the then president Fernando Pombo Ybarra, who was related to his mother.

=== Racing de Santander ===
Pombo was a very fast winger who could adapt to either the right or the left side, with an easy and very effective shot. During his stint at Racing's youth team, he impressed the coach Randolph Galloway enough to line him up just a few weeks later, on 5 November 1933, in the opening match of the 1933–34 La Liga against Real Betis in Seville, in which Pombo scored Racing's only goal in a 1–2 loss. In doing so at the age of 17 years and 145 days, he not only became the youngest-ever player and scorer of Racing's history, two records that he still holds, but also the youngest goal scorer in the history of the Spanish league at the time.

Pombo was the revelation of the 1933–34 season where, at 17 years old, his teammates nicknamed him El chaval ("the kid"). During that season, he was the team's top scorer with 11 goals in 14 games, scoring a hat-trick against Espanyol, one goal against both Athletic Bilbao and Valencia, and a brace against both Barcelona and Real Madrid, the latter against the legendary Ricardo Zamora; all of them at the Sardinero. His goals played a crucial role in helping Racing finish the league in third among ten teams. Naturally, Pombo set several records with this remarkable streak, including being the youngest player to reach double figures in La Liga, aged 17 years, 8 months, and 12 days, which was broken by Barça's Bojan Krkić by only seven days, as well as having the most goals in La Liga before turning 18, a record that remained unmatched for 87 years, until Barça's Ansu Fati's emulated that feat in the 2020–21 La Liga season.

The following season, Pombo scored his second league hat-trick against Athletic Bilbao (6–0) on 30 December 1934, and in the 1935–36 season, Racing finished fourth among twelve teams.

=== After the War ===
His career was then interrupted by the Spanish Civil War, which lasted until 1939, the year in which he returned to Racing, being then loaned to Sevilla when the league season ended, to play three matches in the 1939 Copa del Generalísimo: The two legs of the round of 12 against Ceuta Sport and the first leg of the quarter-finals against Aviación Nacional (all in May), which ended in a 0–2 loss; however, Sevilla won the tie and the title.

Pombo returned to Santander in 1939, where he played with Racing for a further six years, in which the club won two Cantabrian Championships in 1939 and 1940, but was also relegated to the Segunda División in 1940, and then to the Tercera División in 1943, before returning to the second in 1944. He is thus one of the few Racing players who played for the club in all three divisions. In addition to the 1933–34 season, he was also the team's top scorer in 1940–41 (9 goals in 9 games), and 1941–42 (6 goals in 14 games). Throughout his career, Pombo scored two four-goal hauls in a single game on two occasions, first against Salamanca on 9 February 1941 and then again on 14 January 1945 against Leonesa, both at the Sardinero. In total, he scored 54 goals in 124 official games, including 19 goals in 50 La Liga games.

=== Later career ===
In 1945, Pombo left Racing to move to Cartagena to work for Campsa, where he took the opportunity to play for Cartagena FC (1945–46). In 1946, also due to his work reasons, he had to move that same season to Jerez de la Frontera, where he joined the ranks of Xerez Club before the end of the 1945–46 season. A few months later, he signed for Third Division side Cádiz CF thanks to the efforts of its coach, Gabriel Andonegui, making his debut with the yellows on the opening match of the 1946–47 season, which ended in a scandalous thrashing against Algeciras CF (6–1). In total, Pombo played with Cádiz for three seasons, scoring 20 goals in 57 league appearances, one goal in two cup matches, as well as 4 goals in 6 Copa Federación matches.

In the 1949–50 season, Pombo signed for Jerez CD, the new club of Xerez after the previous one disappeared, and he remained there for six seasons, retiring at the end of the 53–54 season, aged 38. On 8 October 1950, Pombo scored all five goals in a 5–1 win over Real Betis (5–1) at the Domecq stadium in Jerez.

== Death ==
Pombo settled in Ciudad Real, where he continued working for Campsa as head of the company's commercial agency. Pombo died in Ciudad Real on 15 January 2001, at the age of 84.

== Honours ==
Racing de Santander

- Cantabrian Championship:
  - Champions (3): 1933–34, 1938–39 and 1939–40
- Tercera División:
  - Champions (1): 1943–44

Sevilla FC

- Copa del Rey:
  - Champions (1): 1939
