= Tommy Ross (footballer) =

Scottish footballer

Personal information
- Full name: Thomas Ross
- Date of birth: 27 February 1946
- Place of birth: Tain, Ross and Cromarty, Scotland
- Date of death: 18 May 2017 (aged 71)
- Height: 5 ft 6 in (1.68 m)
- Position: Inside forward

Youth career
- Ross County

Senior career*
| Years | Team | Apps | (Gls) |
| 1961–1965 | Ross County | 78 | (71) |
| 1965–1968 | Peterborough United | 7 | (2) |
| 1968–1970 | York City | 61 | (20) |
| 1970–1972 | Wigan Athletic | | |
| 1972–1977 | Rossdendale United | | |
| 1977– | Brora Rangers | | |
| Total | | 68 | (22) |

Managerial career
- 1992–1997: Tain St Duthus
- * Club domestic league appearances and goals

Thomas Ross (27 February 1946 – 18 May 2017) was a Scottish professional footballer who played as an inside forward in the Football League for Peterborough United and York City, in the Highland League for Ross County and in non-League football for Wigan Athletic and Rossendale United. He holds the Guinness World Record for the fastest time to score a hat-trick.

Ross joined Ross County in 1961, at the age of 15, and scored his first goal for the club in his debut season. During the 1964–65 season, he scored 44 goals, including a record-breaking hat-trick against Nairn County on 28 November 1964, where he scored three goals within a 90-second period. His record was not recognised until April 2004, with the official record being held by Jimmy O'Connor of Dublin side Shelbourne, for his 2m 14s treble against Bohemians on 19 November 1967.

After his playing career ended, Ross managed Tain St Duthus in the 1990s. His sons Stuart and Andrew now form the management team of the club, which was revived in 2016. Ross also worked as a scout for Tottenham Hotspur.

His death was reported on the website of St Duthus FC on 19 May 2017.

== See also ==
- List of footballers who achieved hat-trick records
