= Giorgos Kyrgias =

Greek footballer

Personal information
- Date of birth: 10 April 1956 (age 70)
- Place of birth: Larissa, Greece

Team information
- Current team: Diogenis Larissa (manager)

Giorgos Kyrgias (Greek: Γιώργος Κύργιας; born 10 April 1956) is a Greek football manager and former player, who holds the record for the longest-serving coach in Greek football (Note: Giannis Tsemperidis of AS Dailakis is the second longest-service coach in Greek football with 30 consecutives seasons at the club, all in the top tier of FCA Kastoria, since 1994.). He has managed fifth-division club Diogenis Larissa FC since 1987. His 35-year tenure is also one of the highest ever worldwide.

== Biography ==
Kyrgias started his career from the youth section of AEL as a right winger in the early 1970s and later played for various teams in the amateur divisions of the Larissa FCA and also in regional leagues of Australia. After playing for Atromitos Agion Anargyron between 1974 and 1977, he founded Fortuna Larissa (inspired by Fortuna Düsseldorf) in 1982 and became the club's player-manager and president until 1986. He took over Diogenis in 1987 attracting ever since many well-known players usually during the later stages of their careers such as Greek champions with Panathinaikos Nikos Patsiavouras and Dimitris Tsapatoris, Thomas Koutsianikoulis, Lefteris Eleftheriou, (Note: Eleftheriou was the world's highest goalscorer in a single match, from the 1985-86 until 2014-15, with 19 goals scored in a match in the Greek seventh tier. In 2014, Yanick Djouzi Manzizila scored 21 goals in a game in the Swedish 7th division and currently holds the record.) former AEL players Nikos Vlachoulis, Thanasis Ntelopoulos, Nikos Nanoulis, Vangelis Kotsios, Triantafyllos Mangos and former Apollon Larissa players Nikos Zisakis and Michalis Bizios.
He currently coaches Diogenis with experienced Nikos Vlachoulis as his assistant, a manager who had been at the helm of Iraklis Larissa, AO Trikala, AEL, and Apollon Larissa in the past. The 2026–27 season will be his 40th consecutive with the club. He was honored for his record by his former club Atromitos Agion Anargiron on 10 March 2023. Kyrgias has only missed two games on bench since 1987.

== Personal life ==
Giorgos Kyrgias is brother to taekwondo grandmaster of 9 Dans, legendary Greek-Australian Chris Kyrgias who died on 16 June 2019 at the age of 67, in a motorbike accident in Macedonia, Greece.
