= Nap hand =

Victory condition

A nap hand is a series of five winning points or five victories in a game or sport.

The term possibly derives from the card game Nap or Napoleon.

== See also ==
- Hat trick
