= Vangelis Moras =

Greek footballer and manager (born 1981)

Personal information
- Full name: Evangelos Moras
- Date of birth: 26 August 1981 (age 45)
- Place of birth: Larissa, Greece
- Height: 1.93 m (6 ft 4 in)
- Position: Centre-back

Team information
- Current team: Athens Kallithea (manager)

Youth career
- 1996–1999: Ampelokipoi Larissa

Senior career*
Years	Team	Apps	(Gls)
1999–2001	AEL	28	(1)
2001–2003	Proodeftiki	35	(0)
2003–2007	AEK Athens	88	(0)
2007–2011	Bologna	102	(4)
2011–2012	Swansea City	1	(0)
2012	Cesena	15	(0)
2012–2016	Hellas Verona	139	(5)
2016–2017	FC Bari	24	(0)
2017–2018	Panetolikos	12	(0)
2018–2020	AEL	46	(3)
2020–2021	Apollon Larissa	23	(1)
Total		513	(14)

International career
2002–2004	Greece U21	11	(0)
2004	Greece Olympic	3	(0)
2009–2016	Greece	27	(0)

Managerial career
- 2021–2022: P.O. Elassona
- 2022: Apollon Larissa
- 2023–2024: Ethnikos Neo Keramidi
- 2024–2026: Greece U19
- 2026–: Athens Kallithea
- * Club domestic league appearances and goals

Vangelis Moras (Greek: Βαγγέλης Μόρας; born 26 August 1981) is a Greek former professional footballer who played as a centre-back. He is the current manager of Athens Kallithea.

== Club career ==
=== Early years ===
Moras started his football Ampelokipoi Larissa playing as a striker having Marco Van Basten as his idol. In 1999, aged 18, along with his Ampelokipoi teammate Kostas Paparizos, he moved to Beta Ethniki side AEL. During his 2-year sting with AEL, Moras was converted to a defender after Serbian coach Nebojsa Licanin changed his position. In 2001 after AEL were relegated to Gamma Ethniki he signed for Proodeftiki helping the club win promotion and return the first division in 2002.

=== AEK Athens ===
After his first season in the first division, Moras was transferred to AEK Athens on 7 August 2003 for a fee of €260,000, as a personal choice of the manager, Dušan Bajević. He stayed at the club even at the new effort made by the administration of Demis Nikolaidis in 2004 and left in 2007. With AEK he also competed in European in the UEFA Champions League group stage in 2003 and in 2006, while also played in the Cup final on 10 May 2006 losing to Olympiacos.

=== Bologna ===
Moras left AEK Athens after the expiration of his contract. On 1 July 2007, he signed for the Italian club Bologna. After his first season there, the club was promoted to the Serie A. Moras scored his first goal for Bologna against S.S.C. Napoli scoring the winning goal.

He made 104 appearances in his career at Bologna in all competitions.

=== Swansea City ===
On 14 October 2011, it was confirmed that the player joined Premier League team Swansea City. FIFA gave Swansea City the green light to sign Vangelis Moras on a three-month deal. The Greek defender, a free agent having left Bologna in the summer, agreed terms with Swansea after a trial in South Wales, scoring a goal in a friendly against Llanelli on 7 October 2011. Delays in processing the paperwork looked set to leave Rodgers with only one fully fit centre-half for Saturday's trip to Norwich. He made his Premier League debut in a 2–2 draw with Wolves on 22 October 2011. He left the club after his three-month deal expired in January 2012.

=== Cesena ===
Cesena officially signed Moras a free agent after his short-term contract with Swansea expired and signed a new deal until the end of the season. The Sea Horses announced that Moras will undergo his medical on Thursday before taking on his first training session.

In his interview, the defender who was under contract until June, was ready to take the field against Novara: "I am happy for my arrival even with a two-years' delay, as last season we were very close. With Swansea I did not go well (only 7 games with 6 of them with the reserve-team), so I desperately want to go back to Italy and I thanks Cesena for this opportunity." Furthermore, he said that "the situation is difficult but we can save, I'm used to fighting. I know the coach, it was he who took me to Italy, in Bologna, where I stayed four seasons, the best time of my career so far. I am a close friend of Antonioli together we were rossoblù: it was old then, it's old now, nothing has changed."

On 21 January 2012, he made his debut with Cesena in a 5–1 loss with Roma. He left the club after his six-month deal expired in June 2012.

=== Hellas Verona ===
On 1 July 2012, Moras signed for the Italian club Hellas Verona. After his first season there, the club was promoted to the Serie A. In June 2013, Panathinaikos was chasing the signature of the Greek international. The Athenian giants missed out on European football for the first time in almost two decades. Panathinaikos offered him a two-year contract worth around €200-250,000 a year.

Eventually, the upcoming deal with Panathinaikos did not come to an end, and the Greek defender signed with the club for another year. Moras scored his first goal for Verona against Varese, scoring the winning goal. In a game against Bologna, Moras did not react to a biff from Jonatan Cristaldo during the Serie A match between his club and Bologna FC at Stadio Marc'Antonio Bentegodi on 2 March 2014 in Verona. Additionally, on 9 April 2014, in an interview, he said "Europe? I don’t even want to hear that word," he told reporters at a trade event this week. "We are thinking about every Sunday's game, we will see at the end where we will be. I am not thinking about Europe, it is the only thing that can make me feel bad. Now we hope to close the season out very well, because it is good for the club and for the fans. This was a very difficult season, we were able to achieve safety in March and this was an important thing. It was not easy to reach this target and teams with more experienced players were not able to do it, and we have. Now let's enjoy this moment, we have been through some difficulties and we now think to finish well."

Vangelis Moras was part of the 23 players of Greece to fly to Brazil. Hellas Verona's Fernando Santos, coach of Greece, decided to bet big on him. The first to believe in the quality of Vangelis Moras of Bologna was Fabrizio Salvatori, who took him in red and blue, " ...was released, and really wanted to come to Italy – says Salvatori exclusive to GianlucaDiMarzio.com – He accepted a year contract with an option for three more years if he had done well, and so it was with Bologna in Serie B came by a couple of goals in that year, and contributing significantly to the promotion. He steadily grows in confidence, which led him to play in the World Cup. He is a versatile player who improves every year. But even before this is a great guy who deserves this call, after he has done very well this year in Verona."

On 8 July 2014 Hellas Verona renewed Greek international Moras’ contract until June 2015. The defender put pen to paper on a new deal, which includes an option to add another year until June 2016. On 21 April 2015 Vangelis Moras reached 100 appearances with the jersey of Hellas Verona and Greek international defender celebrated, by holding a Greek flag on Instagram.

On 17 May 2015, Vangelis Moras in an interview, expressed his concern regarding the future of the club in the midst of rumors suggesting that the club might be sold. Speaking after his side's 2–1 win over Empoli, the Greek centre-back also demanded more clarity from owner Maurizio Setti despite the Italian businessman having recently stated that the club will not be sold in the summer. "The president has denied the sale of the club, but I want more certainty," said the 33-year-old to Sky Sport Italia."And I hope all things are sorted and we’ll be ready to start again properly from next season." There were a number of Gialloblu players whose contracts were set to expire in the summer of 2015, including that of Moras.

On 18 September 2015, Moras stated that he wants to finish his career with Hellas Verona " Ours is not a job like any other, in a football team we are mates, the fans and the company. I am at Verona for four years and for me it's like a second family. All helped me to deal with this difficult problem, all were close to me and I can only say thank you to the men with whom I have a relationship important and special. I feel part of this team and I want to close my career here. Toughest opponents? No doubt those lower down in the standings, one must not underestimate them because they might put you in more trouble than large. " said to calcionews. On 29 November 2015, he scored his first goal for the 2015–16 season in a 2–3 away loss against Frosinone with his header squirming through Nicola Leali's hands in a goalkeeping howler.

=== Bari ===
On 5 July 2016 F.C. Bari 1908 announced Moras signed a two-year deal with the club. He played as a starter in the first Serie B games, but on 5 September 2016, after the training he went for medical examinations that revealed a muscle injury. On 22 October 2016, he returned to the starting XI of the squad in a home game against Trapani Calcio.

=== Panetolikos ===
On 30 August 2017, Moras signed a contract with Panetolikos, returning to Greece after almost 10 years in Italy. On 9 December 2017 Vangelis Moras reached 100 appearances in the Super League Greece.

=== Return to AEL ===
On 31 January 2018, AEL officially announced the acquisition of experienced former international central midfielder on a six-months contract. The 37-year-old player, returned in his hometown Larissa, after 16 years. Moras began the 2017–18 season in Panetolikos but was released after six months due to mutual disagreement. On 30 March 2019, he scored his first goal with the club with a powerful header from Stefan Živković’s corner, sealing a 2–1 home win game against rivals Asteras Tripolis.

=== Apollon Larissa ===
On 9 September 2020, Moras signed with Super League Greece 2 club Apollon Larissa a year contract for an undisclosed fee. On 17 March 2021 he scored his first goal with the new team against O.F. Ierapetra with the match ended 1-1.

On 7 July 2021, he announced via Instagram his retirement from professional football.

== International career ==
Moras competed for Greece at the 2004 Summer Olympics.

Following performances for his club in the Serie A, Moras was called up to play for Greece on 11 February 2009 in a friendly against Denmark, where he made his international debut. Greece manager Otto Rehhagel announced the ten men to make up part of the squad to take on the Danes in Piraeus, with the remainder of locally based players to be called up as the match approaches.

He established himself in manager Siniša Mihajlović's first-team, making 18 appearances and scored a goal during his side's 2–1 away loss against Inter Milan. Quoted by the Hellenic Football Federation (EPO) official website, the Bologna centre-back expressed a desire to seize the rare opportunity; if he played against Denmark it would have been his first ever appearance for the national team. "My call-up to the national team is something that I wanted after all the efforts of my career, something that they have vindicated. I am grateful to the people who have shown faith in me. On my part, I am prepared to do everything to please my manager and to maintain my position in the national team for a long time." Moras said.

He was called by Santos to the 30 man provisional World Cup squad and to the final 23-man squad for 2014 FIFA World Cup.

== Managerial career ==
On 12 July 2021, Gamma Ethniki (third tier) Greek club P.O. Elassona announced the signing of Moras as their manager for the 2021–22 Gamma Ethniki season. He managed the team to their second Larissa FCA Cup win, after beating Iraklis Larissa in the final.

On 5 July 2022, it was announced that Moras returned to Apollon Larissa as manager. He resigned on 10 December 2022, citing disorganization within the club structure.

On 4 February 2023, Moras joined Ethnikos Neo Keramidi in the Gamma Ethniki.

== Managerial statistics ==
As of 20 September 2026.

Team	From	To	Record								Ref.
Team	From	To	G	W	D	L	GF	GA	GD	Win %	Ref.
(Greece) P.O. Elassona	12 July 2021	30 June 2022	28	16	5	7	47	22	+25	57.14	
(Greece) Apollon Larissa	5 July 2022	10 December 2022	7	4	0	3	11	10	+1	57.14	
(Greece) Ethnikos Neo Keramidi	4 February 2023	30 June 2024	16	9	4	3	23	15	+8	56.25	
Greece U19	2 August 2024	30 June 2026	22	7	8	7	37	26	+11	31.82	
(Greece) Athens Kallithea	1 July 2026	Present	4	2	0	2	6	7	-1	50.00	
Career total			77	38	17	22	124	80	+44	49.35	—

== Personal life ==
In July 2014, Moras travelled to Australia to donate bone marrow to his brother Dimitris, who had been diagnosed with acute myeloid leukaemia while on holiday in the country and was being treated in a Melbourne hospital. On 17 July 2015, Moras' brother left his last breath in Larissa State Hospital, where he had been transferred recently. On 27 August 2015, Moras received in the Red Room of the province of Verona the Award "Grande della Scala" by Presidente Giunta Provincia Antonio Pastorello, after the battle alongside his brother, who died from acute myeloid leukaemia last July.

On 20 February 2016, at the stadium Bentegodi, on the occasion of the derby between Hellas Verona F.C. and Chievo will host the "Save Moras" initiative, promoted by the Foundation to sensitize citizens on the importance of bone marrow donation and support for people affected by leukemia. "Save Moras" was founded by Vangelis Moras in memory of his brother Dimitris, who died in 2015 due to leukemia. During the match, both teams perform on their uniforms playing a patch with the logo of the "Save Moras"; all mesh used by the players during the competition will then be auctioned and the proceeds will be donated to the Foundation. In the interval between the 1st and the 2nd time, the boys of the project "CSI- The Great Challenge" will play in a mini derby wearing the jerseys of professional football players.

== Honours ==
=== Manager ===
P.O. Elassona

- Larissa FCA Cup: 2021–22
