= Ampelokipoi Larissa F.C. =

- Full name: Ampelokipoi Larissa F.C.
- Founded: 1970; 56 years ago
- Ground: Ampelokipoi Ground, Larissa, Greece
- Capacity: 300
- Chairman: Vangelis Moras
- Manager: Akis Tavlaridis
- League: Larissa FCA Second Division
- 2025–26: Larissa FCA Second Division (Group 1), 5th
Home colours	Away colours

Ampelokipoi Larissa F.C. (Greek: ΑΟ Αμπελοκήπων) is a football club based in Larissa, Thessaly, Greece and currently competes in the Larissa FCA league. The colours of the club are red and white and the chairman is Vangelis Moras, an active footballer who also played for the Greece national football team. In January 2020 the club celebrated 50 years of continuous presence in greek football.

== History ==
The club was founded in 1970 in the Ampelokipoi (formerly Tampakika) district of Larissa, on the banks of the Pineios river that crosses the town. Larissa's historic Alcazar Stadium is located in the Ampelokipoi neighbourhood too. The club was often called Tampakiakos started competing in the lowest division of the Larissa Football Clubs Association in the 1970-71 season.
Ampelokipoi Larissa met great success in the 1990s when they played in Delta Ethniki, the fourth tier of the Greek football pyramid, under the guidance of former AEL footballer, Nikos Vlachoulis playing against experienced teams such as Kozani, Kastoria, Iraklis Ptolemaidos and other local rivals like Iraklis Larissa, Falaniakos, Toxotis Larissa and Achilleas Farsala. Since their relegation in 1994, Ampelokipoi never managed to play in a national division but they have been a dominant force in the Larissa FCA leagues, especially during the late 1990s. Their most recent success has been the promotion to the Larissa FCA A1 Division in the season 2014-15 under coach Akis Tavlaridis.

== Co-operation with Ajax Amsterdam ==
On 25 August 2011, Ampelokipoi's chairman Andreas Mpalanikas signed a 5-year plan agreement with the Ajax Youth Academy in Larissa for a future co-operation and development of the young talents of the club. Ex-Ampelokipoi player Vangelis Moras acted as the club's representative at the press conference took place in Larissa with Giorgos Makris, the director of the Ajax Youth Academy in Greece sealing a deal that would be focused on the development of the young players of the club, aged 9–15.

== Ground ==
The club since its foundation has been playing in the Ampelokipoi Ground which is located in the district of Ampelokipoi in Larissa, right next to the Pineios river that crosses the town. The ground that has a capacity of 300 has hosted Delta Ethniki matches from 1991 until 1994 and is considered one of the most historic and iconic in the town of Larissa. A terrace of red colour above its ground's only stand was added in recent years. In addition, the record of the youngest player in greek football to score a hat-trick took place in the Ampelokipoi Ground in 1996, when 14 year old Ntinos Pontikas scored Haravgi Larissa's all 3 goals in a 4-3 defeat by Ampelokipoi Larissa F.C. Kostas Paparizos and Vangelis Moras who were 15 at the time were part of that Ampelokipoi's squad, three years before their transfer to AEL.

== Honours ==
- Larissa FCA Championship:

- Winners (1): 1990-91

=== Classification in Delta Ethniki ===
Season	Classification	Group
1991-92	7th	Group 11
1992-93	11th	Group 11
1993-94	16th	Group 11

== Ampelokipoi players in Greek football ==
Vangelis Moras is without a doubt Ampelokipoi Larissa greatest footballer in its history as he managed to enjoy great success in Greek League, Serie A where he played for almost 10 years and the Greece national football team. Kostas Paparizos, the team's former coach is another footballer who started his career from Ampelokipoi Larissa and remained until the age of 18, when he was transferred to AEL in 1999.
The club biggest regret was the not signing of Vassilis Karapialis, a 5 times Greek champion, who despite the fact that he grew up in the neighbourhood and caught the eye of the club, he would eventually sign for another local club Toxotis Larissa in 1979, at the age of 14.

=== Notable players ===
- (Greece) Vangelis Moras
- (Greece) Kostas Paparizos
- (Greece) Kleanthis "Akis" Tavlaridis
- (Greece) Babis Ntosas
- (Greece) Tasos Beritzas
- (Greece) Giorgos Kolovos
- (Greece) Alexis Nikoulis
- (Greece) Christos Dallas

=== Notable coaches ===
- (Greece) Giannis Alexoulis
- (Greece) Nikos Vlachoulis
- (Greece) Antonis Zarkadoulas
