= Charalampos Dosas =

Greek footballer

Personal information
- Full name: Charalampos Dosas
- Date of birth: 11 December 1962 (age 63)
- Place of birth: Larissa, Greece
- Height: 1.87 m (6 ft 1 1/2 in)
- Position: Defender

Youth career
- 1979-1982: Astir Neo Perivoli

Senior career*
Years	Team	Apps	(Gls)
1982-1986	AEL		
1986-1990	Toxotis		
1990-1991	Achilleas Farsala		
1991-1998	Ampelokipoi Larissa		
- * Club domestic league appearances and goals

Charalampos Dosas (Greek: Χαράλαμπος Ντόσας; born 11 December 1962) is a Greek former professional football player who played as a defender.

== Club career ==
Dosas started his career from the now defunct amateur side Astir Neo Perivoli and he signed for 1982 Greek Cup runners-up AEL in the summer of 1982 alongside also promising young players such as Georgios Mitsibonas and Sakis Tsiolis. They were all chosen by Polish coach Jacek Gmoch.
Ntosas won the 1985 Greek Cup with AEL, one of the strongest sides of Greek football in the 1980s. In 1986 he joined Toxotis Larissa in Delta Ethniki and later Ampelokipoi Larissa where he became the club's captain and one of its most iconic players.
