= Hat-trick =

Achievement of three consecutive sporting feats

A hat-trick or hat trick is the achievement of a generally positive feat three times in a match, or another achievement based on the number three.

== Origin ==
The term was first used in 1858 in cricket, to describe H. H. Stephenson taking three wickets with three consecutive deliveries. Fans held a collection for Stephenson, and presented him with a hat bought with the proceeds. The term appeared in print for the first known time in 1865 in the Chelmsford Chronicle. "Hat trick" was eventually adopted by many other sports, including hockey, association football, Formula 1 racing, rugby, water polo, and competitive video games such as Counter-Strike.

== Use ==
=== Bat and ball games ===
==== Baseball ====
In the past, the term was occasionally used to describe when a player struck out three times in a baseball game, and the term golden sombrero was used when a player struck out four times in a game.

In recent years, hat trick has been more often used to describe when a player hits three home runs in a game.

For example, on 29 August 2015, Toronto Blue Jays fans celebrated Edwin Encarnación's third home run of the game by throwing hats onto the field, similar to the tradition in ice hockey.

==== Cricket ====
A hat-trick occurs in cricket when an individual bowler takes three wickets with consecutive deliveries in the same match.

=== Football codes ===
==== Association football (soccer) ====
A "hat-trick" occurs in association football when a player scores three goals in a single game, while two goals in a single match is called a "brace". In common with other official record-keeping rules, all goals scored during the regulation 90 minutes, plus extra time if required, are counted but goals in a penalty shootout are excluded from the tally. The fastest recorded time to score a hat-trick is 70 seconds, a record set by Alex Torr in a Sunday league game in 2013. The previous record of 90 seconds was held by Tommy Ross playing for Ross County against Nairn County on 28 November 1964. The record of the youngest professional player ever to score a hat-trick belongs to Ntinos Pontikas who was 14 years and 198 days old when he did it in 1996, while Pelé was 17 in 1958 when he became the youngest to achieve a hat-trick in the FIFA World Cup.

After just 18 months and 17 days, the book on the greatest hat-trick of the 21st century was already closed.

— Rob Smyth of The Guardian on Rivaldo's hat-trick for Barcelona against Valencia in June 2001.

The first hat-trick achieved in an international game was by Scottish player John McDougall, against England on 2 March 1878. German Erwin Helmchen scored 141 official hat-tricks in his career with Pelé having 92. American player Bert Patenaude scored the first hat-trick in the FIFA World Cup, against Paraguay in the inaugural event in 1930. Three hat-tricks have been scored in a World Cup final: by Geoff Hurst for England in the 1966 final against West Germany, by Carli Lloyd for the USA against Japan in the 2015 Women's World Cup final and by Kylian Mbappé for France in the 2022 final against Argentina. Lloyd's was, at 16 minutes, the fastest from kick-off in any World Cup match. However, the fastest World Cup hat-trick, as measured by time between goals, belongs to Fabienne Humm of Switzerland, who scored in the 47th, 49th and 52nd minutes against Ecuador in the 2015 group stage.

Traditionally, a player who scores a hat-trick is allowed to keep the match ball as a memento.

The rare occurrence of a player scoring 6 goals in a match is known as a double hat-trick, while a player scoring 9 goals in a match, which is extremely rare at the higher levels of play, is known as a triple hat-trick, with Erling Braut Haaland doing so against Honduras in the 2019 FIFA U-20 World Cup. A player scoring 12 goals in one match is known as a quadruple hat-trick, and has happened only once in a significant professional senior competition, by Archie Thompson against American Samoa in 2001.

===== Perfect hat-trick =====
Football has also extended the term, with a perfect hat-trick being when a player scores one right-footed goal, one left-footed goal and one headed goal within one match.

===== Flawless hat-trick =====
In Germany and Austria, the term (German: lupenreiner) Hattrick (flawless hat-trick) refers to when a player scores three goals in a row in one half without the half-time break or a goal scored by another player interrupting the performance.

==== Gaelic football ====
In Gaelic football, a hat-trick can refer to goals or to points scored.

Eoin Liston scored a second-half hat-trick in the 1978 All-Ireland Senior Football Championship final.

Michael Quinlivan scored a second-half hat-trick against Armagh in the final game of the 2017 National Football League to secure promotion to Division 2 for Tipperary.

Jack McCaffrey's total of 1–3 in the 2019 All-Ireland Senior Football Championship final (drawn game) involved a "classic hat-trick" of points, sent over the bar with fist and both feet.

Cillian O'Connor's four goals (accompanied by nine points) in the 2020 All-Ireland Senior Football Championship semi-final at Croke Park broke the 5–3 record set by Johnny Joyce of Dublin in 1960 and matched with 3–9 by Rory Gallagher of Fermanagh in 2002 for the highest individual scorer in any championship football match.

David Clifford scored a hat-trick against Galway in the opening round of the 2021 National Football League.

==== American football and Canadian football ====
The term hat-trick is only occasionally used in American football and Canadian football, usually for rhetorical flourish in sports writing. Usually an offensive player scoring three touchdowns in a single game is awarded a hat-trick.

The term is also applied to a defensive player, often an edge rusher, who in a single scrimmage play performs a sack which causes the quarterback to fumble, and then recovers that fumble.

==== Rugby union and rugby league ====
In both rugby union and rugby league, a hat-trick is when a player scores three or more tries in a game. In rugby union, a related concept is that of a "full house" (scoring a try, conversion, penalty goal, and drop goal) in a single game. When a player scores two tries, this is often referred to as a brace. As with association football, it is common to award the match ball to a player who scores a hat-trick.

Ken Irvine, Frank Burge, and Alex Johnston have scored 16 hat-tricks in Australian first grade rugby league.

Shaun Johnson scored a hat-trick in under 6 minutes against the Canberra Raiders in 2013, and in the 2017 Rugby League World Cup, Valentine Holmes scored a double hat-trick (6 tries) against Fiji.

=== Handball ===
In handball, if a player scores thrice in a game, a hat-trick is made.

=== Hockey ===
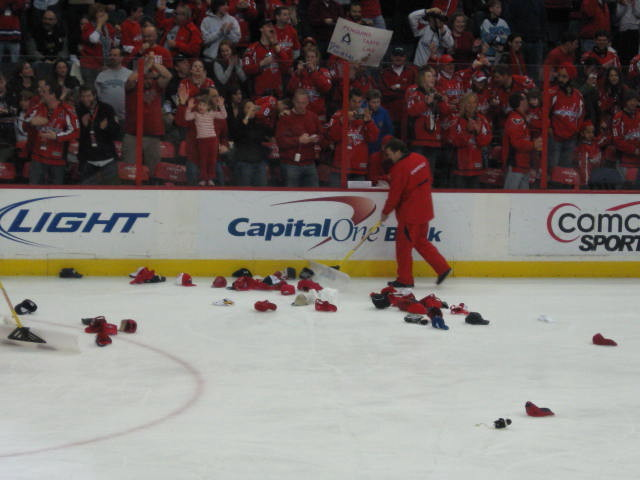
Hats on the Verizon Center ice after Alex Ovechkin's hat trick in the Washington Capitals' 5–4 overtime win over the Pittsburgh Penguins on 7 February 2010

In field hockey, ice hockey, and bandy, a hat trick occurs when a player scores three goals in a single game. A hat trick in ice hockey, as it is known in its latest form, culminates with fans throwing hats onto the ice from the stands. The tradition is said to have begun among fans in the National Hockey League around the 1950s, with several conflicting legends from the Canadian cities of Toronto, Montreal, and Guelph of various hatmakers offering a free hat to players who scored a hat trick.

In 1946, the Biltmore Hat Company in Guelph sponsored the Guelph Biltmore Mad Hatters, a junior affiliate team of the NHL's New York Rangers. When a Mad Hatters player recorded a Hat Trick, hats were thrown on the ice and the player received a new Biltmore fedora after the game to honor his accomplishment.

Wayne Gretzky holds the NHL record for the most hat tricks in a career with 50. Harry Hyland scored the league's first hat trick, in the league's first game on 18 December 1917, in which Hyland's Montreal Wanderers defeated the Toronto Arenas 10–9.

The most hat tricks achieved across an entire NHL season occurred in the 1981–82 NHL season, with 139 hat tricks. The monthly record for most NHL hat tricks goes to January 2026, with 31 hat tricks, surpassing the previous record of 29 hat tricks in December 1985.

==== Variations ====
In ice hockey, a natural hat trick occurs when a player scores three consecutive goals, uninterrupted by any other player scoring for either team. The NHL record for the fastest natural hat trick is 21 seconds, set by Bill Mosienko in 1952 for the Chicago Blackhawks.

A Gordie Howe hat trick is a tongue-in-cheek play on the feat. It is achieved by scoring a goal, getting an assist, and getting into a fight, all in the same game. Namesake Gordie Howe himself only recorded two in his NHL career. Rick Tocchet accomplished the feat 18 times in his career, the most in NHL history.

In October 1995, Florida Panthers captain Scott Mellanby scored a rat trick, the term coined by teammate John Vanbiesbrouck. Prior to the game, Mellanby killed a rat in the Panthers' locker room with his hockey stick, and proceeded to score a pair of goals later that night. When Mellanby scored a hat trick in a later game, some Florida fans threw plastic rats onto the ice, a tradition that continued for all Panthers' goals throughout the 1996 playoffs. Due to the resulting game delays caused by the necessary clean-up of the plastic rats, the league eventually banned the activity and modified Rule 63 to impose a minor penalty against the home team for a violation. The more traditional practice of fans throwing hats onto the ice following genuine hat tricks remains exempt from this penalty.

=== Hurling ===
Eddie O'Brien scored a hat-trick for Cork against Wexford in the 1970 All-Ireland Senior Hurling Championship final.

Lar Corbett scored a hat-trick for Tipperary in the 2010 All-Ireland Senior Football Championship final to deny Kilkenny what would have been a record-breaking fifth consecutive title.

Shane O'Donnell scored a first-half hat-trick for Clare against Cork in the 2013 All-Ireland Senior Hurling Championship replay, despite not featuring at all in the drawn game.

=== Lacrosse ===
In lacrosse, like other sports with goal scoring, hat tricks occur when a player scores three goals in one game. Fans rarely throw hats onto the playing surface to acknowledge them due to their frequent occurrences in a game. When a player scores six goals in one game, it is referred to as a sock trick.

=== Motor racing ===
In motor racing, three successive race wins, winning the same event three times in a row, or securing pole position, fastest lap and race victory in one event may all be referred to as a hat-trick.

=== Water polo ===
In water polo, if a player scores thrice in a game, a hat-trick is scored.

== See also ==
- Hitting for the cycle
- Nap hand
- Trifecta
- Triple Crown (disambiguation)
- Turkey (bowling)
- Triple double
- Three-peat
