= 2026–27 Gamma Ethniki =

Greek 3rd tier football season

Gamma Ethniki
- Season: 2026–27
- Dates: 26 September - May 2027
- Matches: 476
- Goals: 1,172 (2.46 per match)
- All statistics correct as of 22 November 2026.

The 2026–27 Gamma Ethniki is the 45th season since the official establishment of the championship in 1982 and the sixth season in which it serves as the third tier of the Greek football league system following the 2021 restructuring. The competition has an amateur status and is organised by the Hellenic Football Federation (HFF).

The draw for the fixtures took place on Friday 31 July 2026 in Athens and the full regular season schedule for every group was released shortly after.

== Format ==
The league comprised 113 teams, divided into ten groups according to geographical criteria. The deadline for entries was Friday, 3 July 2026.

The following eight eligible clubs did not enter the competition:

- Aris Petroupolis
- Apollon Krya Vrysi
- Alexandreia
- Thyella Ampelokipoi, the Zakynthos FCA champions; they were replaced by runners-up A.O. Levante
- PAS Aneza, the Arta FCA champions
- Agios Athanasios Hydroussa, the Samos FCA champions
- Dafni Dafnonas Chios, the Chios FCA champions
- Kampaniakos, who were relegated from the 2025–26 Super League Greece 2

=== Promotion and relegation rules ===
In the first phase (regular season), every team plays each of the other teams in its group twice, once at home and once away.

In the second phase, the teams finishing first through sixth in the 12-team groups and first through fifth in the remaining 11 and 10-team groups will enter their respective promotion group, carrying over all points earned in the first phase. Each promotion group will be played as a single round-robin tournament, with the group winner qualifying for the final promotion phase. The teams finishing seventh through twelfth in the 12-team groups, sixth through eleventh in the 11-team groups and sixth through tenth in the ten-team Group 1, will enter their respective relegation group, also carrying over their first-phase points. The bottom three teams in each group will be relegated, for a total of 30 relegated clubs.

In the third and final phase, the ten group winners from their respective phase two promotion groups, will be divided geographically into a North group (winners of Groups 1–5) and a South group (winners of Groups 6–10). After a double round-robin tournament, the top two teams in each group will be promoted to next year's Super League Greece 2.

== Group 1 ==
=== Teams ===
Location of teams in Group 1 of the 2026–27 Gamma Ethniki

Team	Location	Ground
Apollon Paralimnio	Paralimnio	Paralimnio Municipal Ground
Ardas Kastanies	Kastanies	Kastanies Municipal Ground
Doxa Drama	Drama	Doxa Drama Stadium
Doxa Neo Sidirochori	Neo Sidirochori	Neo Sidirochori Municipal Ground
A.E. Thraki	Koutso	Koutso Municipal Ground
Kavala	Kavala	Anthi Karagianni Stadium
Megas Aetos Orfano	Ofrynio	Ofrynio Municipal Ground
Xanthi	Xanthi	Xanthi Ground
Orfeas Eleftheroupoli	Eleftheroupoli	Eleftheroupoli Municipal Stadium
PAO Pontioi Nea Amisos	Nea Amisos	Nea Amisos Municipal Ground

=== First Phase Standings ===
Pos	Team	Pld	W	D	L	GF	GA	GD	Pts	Promotion or relegation
1	Doxa Drama	7	7	0	0	24	4	+20	21	Qualification for the promotion group
2	Xanthi	7	5	1	1	14	4	+10	16	Qualification for the promotion group
3	Orfeas Eleftheroupoli	7	4	1	2	11	8	+3	13	Qualification for the promotion group
4	Kavala	7	3	1	3	8	9	−1	10	Qualification for the promotion group
5	Ardas Kastanies	7	3	0	4	10	13	−3	9	Qualification for the promotion group
6	PAO Pontioi Nea Amisos	7	3	0	4	7	14	−7	9	Qualification for the promotion group
7	Apollon Paralimnio	7	2	1	4	6	13	−7	7	Qualification for the relegation group
8	Megas Aetos Orfano	7	2	1	4	14	16	−2	7	Qualification for the relegation group
9	A.E. Thraki	7	1	2	4	5	11	−6	5	Qualification for the relegation group
10	Doxa Neo Sidirochori	7	0	3	4	7	14	−7	3	Qualification for the relegation group

Updated to match(es) played on 22 November 2026. Source: Hellenic Football Federation: 2026-27 Standings (Group 1) (in Greek)
Rules for classification: 1) points; 2) head-to-head points; 3) head-to-head goal difference.

=== First Phase Results ===
Home \ Away	APP	ARD	DOD	DNS	AET	KAV	AOF	XAN	ORF	PAO
Apollon Paralimnio	—	1–3				1–3	1–0			1–0
Ardas Kastanies		—		2–0	0–1				1–2	3–2
Doxa Drama	2–1		—	3–2			5–1			5–0
Doxa Neo Sidirochori				—		0–0	3–3	0–3	2–2	
A.E. Thraki	0–0				—	0–1		1–1		
Kavala			0–3			—	3–2		0–1	
Megas Aetos Orfano		4–1			4–2		—	0–1		
Xanthi	5–1	3–0	0–2					—	1–0	
Orfeas Eleftheroupoli			0–4		3–0				—	3–0
PAO Pontioi Nea Amisos				1–0	2–1	2–1				—

Updated to match(es) played on 22 November 2026. Source: Hellenic Football Federation: 2026-27 Results (Group 1) (in Greek)
Legend: Blue = home team win; Yellow = draw; Red = away team win.

== Group 2 ==
=== Teams ===
Location of teams in Group 2 of the 2026–27 Gamma Ethniki

Team	Location	Ground
Akrites Sykies	Sykies	Sykies Municipal Stadium
Asteras Agios Nikolaos	Agios Nikolaos, Chalkidiki	Agios Nikolaos Ground
Iraklis Thermaikos	Thessaloniki	Kampaniakos Ground
Kilkisiakos	Kilkis	Kilkis Municipal Stadium
PAOK Kristoni	Kristoni	Kristoni Municipal Ground
Makedonikos	Efkarpia	Makedonikos Stadium
MPAM FC	Thessaloniki	Evosmos Municipal Stadium
Panedessaikos	Edessa	Rizari Municipal Stadium
A.E. Polykastro	Polykastro	Polykastro Municipal Stadium
Poseidon Nea Michaniona	Michaniona	Nea Michaniona Ground
Foinikas Polichni	Polichni	Polichni Municipal Ground

=== First Phase Standings ===
Pos	Team	Pld	W	D	L	GF	GA	GD	Pts	Promotion or relegation
1	Iraklis Thermaikos	9	5	4	0	9	1	+8	19	Qualification for the promotion group
2	Foinikas Polichni	9	5	2	2	13	11	+2	17	Qualification for the promotion group
3	Asteras Agios Nikolaos	8	5	1	2	15	5	+10	16	Qualification for the promotion group
4	Poseidon Nea Michaniona	8	4	2	2	13	7	+6	14	Qualification for the promotion group
5	PAOK Kristoni	8	4	2	2	11	10	+1	14	Qualification for the promotion group
6	MPAM FC	8	2	4	2	14	14	0	10	Qualification for the promotion group
7	Makedonikos	8	2	4	2	9	9	0	10	Qualification for the relegation group
8	A.E. Polykastro	8	2	2	4	7	8	−1	8	Qualification for the relegation group
9	Panedessaikos	8	2	1	5	8	12	−4	7	Qualification for the relegation group
10	Akrites Sykies	8	2	0	6	6	15	−9	6	Qualification for the relegation group
11	Kilkisiakos	8	0	2	6	10	23	−13	2	Qualification for the relegation group

Updated to match(es) played on 22 November 2026. Source: Hellenic Football Federation: 2026-27 Standings (Group 2) (in Greek)
Rules for classification: 1) points; 2) head-to-head points; 3) head-to-head goal difference.

=== First Phase Results ===
Home \ Away	AKR	ASN	IRT	KIL	PAK	MAK	MPAM	PAE	POL	POS	FOI
Akrites Sykies	—	0–2			0–3					0–2	
Asteras Agios Nikolaos		—	1–1	6–1	0–1				1–0		3–1
Iraklis Thermaikos	1–0		—	0–0				2–0		1–0	
Kilkisiakos				—		0–2	4–4	1–3	1–3		
PAOK Kristoni			0–0		—			3–1	1–0		1–1
Makedonikos	0–2	1–0	0–0			—			1–1	2–2	
MPAM FC	3–1		0–3		3–1	2–2	—				
Panedessaikos	2–0	0–2					1–1	—			1–2
A.E. Polykastro	2–3							1–0	—	0–0	0–1
Poseidon Nea Michaniona				2–1	5–1		1–0			—	
Foinikas Polichni			0–1	3–2		2–1	1–1			2–1	—

Updated to match(es) played on 22 November 2026. Source: Hellenic Football Federation: 2026-27 Results (Group 2) (in Greek)
Legend: Blue = home team win; Yellow = draw; Red = away team win.

== Group 3 ==
=== Teams ===
Location of teams in Group 3 of the 2026–27 Gamma Ethniki

Team	Location	Ground
Anagennisi Arta	Arta	Arta Municipal Stadium
A.S. Vatolakkos	Vatolakkos	Grevena FCA Ground
Veria	Veria	Veria Stadium
Doxa Mascholouri	Mascholouri	Mascholouri Municipal Ground
Eordaikos	Ptolemaida	Emilios Theofanidis Municipal Stadium
Thyella Katsikas	Katsikas	Katsikas Municipal Sports Centre
Kastoria 1980	Kastoria	Kastoria Municipal Stadium
Makedonikos Siatista	Siatista	Siatista Municipal Stadium
Megas Alexandros Florina	Florina	Florina Municipal Sports Centre
Naousa	Naousa	Antonios Konstantinidis Municipal Stadium
PAS Giannina	Ioannina	Zosimades Stadium

=== First Phase Standings ===
Pos	Team	Pld	W	D	L	GF	GA	GD	Pts	Promotion or relegation
1	Makedonikos Siatista	8	7	1	0	16	6	+10	22	Qualification for the promotion group
2	Veria	8	6	1	1	16	8	+8	19	Qualification for the promotion group
3	PAS Giannina	8	4	3	1	13	6	+7	15	Qualification for the promotion group
4	Eordaikos	8	4	1	3	9	8	+1	13	Qualification for the promotion group
5	Doxa Mascholouri	8	3	3	2	6	6	0	12	Qualification for the promotion group
6	Anagennisi Arta	8	3	3	2	11	7	+4	12	Qualification for the promotion group
7	Kastoria 1980	8	2	3	3	6	8	−2	9	Qualification for the relegation group
8	Megas Alexandros Florina	8	2	1	5	15	13	+2	7	Qualification for the relegation group
9	Naousa	8	2	1	5	8	9	−1	7	Qualification for the relegation group
10	Thyella Katsikas	9	1	4	4	9	13	−4	7	Qualification for the relegation group
11	A.S. Vatolakkos	9	0	1	8	1	26	−25	1	Qualification for the relegation group

Updated to match(es) played on 22 November 2026. Source: Hellenic Football Federation: 2026-27 Standings (Group 3) (in Greek)
Rules for classification: 1) points; 2) head-to-head points; 3) head-to-head goal difference.

=== First Phase Results ===
Home \ Away	ANA	VAT	VER	DOM	EOR	THK	KAS	MAS	MEF	NAO	PAS
Anagennisi Arta	—				2–1	1–1		2–3		3–1	
A.S. Vatolakkos	0–3	—		0–0		0–2	0–1	0–3			
Veria		4–0	—	0–0	2–1						3–2
Doxa Mascholouri	1–0			—			2–1			1–0	
Eordaikos				2–0	—				3–2	1–0	
Thyella Katsikas				2–2	0–1	—	1–1				1–1
Kastoria 1980	0–0		1–3				—	0–1			1–1
Makedonikos Siatista			3–1	1–0	0–0	2–1		—	3–2		
Megas Alexandros Florina		5–1	0–1			4–1	0–1		—	1–1	
Naousa		4–0	1–2			1–0				—	0–1
PAS Giannina	0–0	4–0			2–0				2–1		—

Updated to match(es) played on 22 November 2026. Source: Hellenic Football Federation: 2026-27 Results (Group 3) (in Greek)
Legend: Blue = home team win; Yellow = draw; Red = away team win.

== Group 4 ==
=== Teams ===
Location of teams in Group 4 of the 2026–27 Gamma Ethniki

Team	Location	Ground
Anthoupoli Larissa	Larissa	Neapoli Municipal Ground
Digenis Neochori	Oichalia	Babis Papachatzis Municipal Ground
Ethnikos Neo Keramidi	Neo Keramidi	Neo Keramidi Municipal Ground
Elassona	Elassona	Elassona Municipal Ground
Ermis Exochi	Exochi	Exochi Municipal Ground
Iraklis Larissa	Larissa	Neapoli Municipal Sports Centre
A.E. Karitsa	Karitsa	Karitsa Municipal Ground
Pierikos	Katerini	Katerini Stadium
Rigas Feraios Velestino	Velestino	Velestino Municipal Stadium
Sarakinos Volos	Volos	Sarakinos Ground
Trikala	Trikala	Trikala Municipal Stadium

=== First Phase Standings ===
Pos	Team	Pld	W	D	L	GF	GA	GD	Pts	Promotion or relegation
1	Trikala	8	8	0	0	18	1	+17	24	Qualification for the promotion group
2	Ermis Exochi	8	5	2	1	15	6	+9	17	Qualification for the promotion group
3	Ethnikos Neo Keramidi	8	5	0	3	16	10	+6	15	Qualification for the promotion group
4	Sarakinos Volos	9	4	2	3	16	10	+6	14	Qualification for the promotion group
5	Elassona	8	3	4	1	11	7	+4	13	Qualification for the promotion group
6	Anthoupoli Larissa	9	4	1	4	12	8	+4	13	Qualification for the promotion group
7	Pierikos	8	3	2	3	10	10	0	11	Qualification for the relegation group
8	Rigas Feraios Velestino	8	3	1	4	8	10	−2	10	Qualification for the relegation group
9	A.E. Karitsa	8	1	2	5	4	12	−8	5	Qualification for the relegation group
10	Digenis Neochori	8	0	3	5	3	20	−17	3	Qualification for the relegation group
11	Iraklis Larissa	8	0	1	7	3	22	−19	1	Qualification for the relegation group

Updated to match(es) played on 22 November 2026. Source: Hellenic Football Federation: 2026-27 Standings (Group 4) (in Greek)
Rules for classification: 1) points; 2) head-to-head points; 3) head-to-head goal difference.

=== First Phase Results ===
Home \ Away	ANT	DIG	ENK	ELA	ERX	IRL	KAR	PIE	RIG	SAR	TRI
Anthoupoli Larissa	—			0–1	1–1	4–0			2–0	0–3	
Digenis Neochori	0–3	—	0–5					1–1	0–3		
Ethnikos Neo Keramidi			—				3–0		1–0		1–3
Elassona		1–1	3–0	—			2–0		1–1	1–1	
Ermis Exochi		2–0		3–1	—	4–1		2–0			
Iraklis Larissa			0–3	1–1		—				0–4	0–1
A.E. Karitsa	0–1	1–1			0–1		—			2–1	0–2
Pierikos	2–1		3–0			3–1	1–1	—			
Rigas Feraios Velestino					2–1	2–0			—		0–1
Sarakinos Volos			1–3		1–1			1–0	4–0	—	
Trikala	1–0	4–0						3–0		3–0	—

Updated to match(es) played on 22 November 2026. Source: Hellenic Football Federation: 2026-27 Results (Group 4) (in Greek)
Legend: Blue = home team win; Yellow = draw; Red = away team win.

== Group 5 ==
=== Teams ===
Location of teams in Group 5 of the 2026–27 Gamma Ethniki

Team	Location	Ground
Anagennisi Schimatari	Schimatari	Schimatari Municipal Stadium
Asteras Stavros	Stavros	Stavros Municipal Ground
Diagoras Agia Paraskevi	Agia Paraskevi	Agia Paraskevi Municipal Ground
Thiva	Thebes	Thebes Municipal Stadium
Karystos	Karystos	Loumideio Municipal Ground
Katsantonis Agrafa	Agrafa	Karpenisi Municipal Stadium
Kifissos Kato Tithorea	Kato Tithorea	Kato Tithorea Municipal Ground
Lamia	Lamia	Lamia Municipal Stadium
Nea Artaki	Nea Artaki	Nikos Kilimpas Municipal Stadium
Tamynaikos Aliveri	Aliveri	Tsarpaleio Municipal Ground
Fokikos	Amfissa	Amfissa Municipal Stadium

=== First Phase Standings ===
Pos	Team	Pld	W	D	L	GF	GA	GD	Pts	Promotion or relegation
1	Karystos	8	6	0	2	13	4	+9	18	Qualification for the promotion group
2	Nea Artaki	8	5	2	1	11	2	+9	17	Qualification for the promotion group
3	Lamia	8	5	2	1	15	8	+7	17	Qualification for the promotion group
4	Diagoras Agia Paraskevi	8	4	4	0	7	1	+6	16	Qualification for the promotion group
5	Anagennisi Schimatari	8	4	2	2	11	7	+4	14	Qualification for the promotion group
6	Kifissos Kato Tithorea	8	3	2	3	15	13	+2	11	Qualification for the promotion group
7	Fokikos	9	2	4	3	12	14	−2	10	Qualification for the relegation group
8	Tamynaikos Aliveri	8	2	3	3	7	9	−2	9	Qualification for the relegation group
9	Asteras Stavros	8	2	0	6	9	17	−8	6	Qualification for the relegation group
10	Thiva	8	1	2	5	4	12	−8	5	Qualification for the relegation group
11	Katsantonis Agrafa	9	0	1	8	4	21	−17	1	Qualification for the relegation group

Updated to match(es) played on 22 November 2026. Source: Hellenic Football Federation: 2026-27 Standings (Group 5) (in Greek)
Rules for classification: 1) points; 2) head-to-head points; 3) head-to-head goal difference.

=== First Phase Results ===
Home \ Away	ANS	AST	DIA	THI	KRY	KAT	KIF	LAM	NAR	TAM	FOK
Anagennisi Schimatari	—	4–2			2–1			1–2			1–1
Asteras Stavros		—	0–1					1–4	0–1		
Diagoras Agia Paraskevi			—	1–0	2–0				0–0		
Thiva	0–1			—	0–2		1–4			0–0	
Karystos		2–0			—	2–0	3–0		2–0		
Katsantonis Agrafa	0–0	1–2	1–3	1–2		—					
Kifissos Kato Tithorea		3–1	0–0			3–1	—	1–2		1–2	
Lamia				0–0		1–0		—	0–0	2–4	4–1
Nea Artaki	1–0					4–0			—	1–0	4–0
Tamynaikos Aliveri	0–2	1–3	0–0							—	0–0
Fokikos			0–0	3–1	0–1	4–0	3–3				—

Updated to match(es) played on 22 November 2026. Source: Hellenic Football Federation: 2026-27 Results (Group 5) (in Greek)
Legend: Blue = home team win; Yellow = draw; Red = away team win.

== Group 6 ==
=== Teams ===
Location of teams in Group 6 of the 2026–27 Gamma Ethniki

Team	Location	Ground
OF Agios Matthaios	Agios Matthaios	Agios Matthaios Municipal Ground
Aris Filiates	Filiates	Filiates National Stadium
Atromitos Patras	Patras	Zarouchleika Municipal Ground
A.O. Levante	Galaro	Machairado Municipal Ground
Lefkimmi	Lefkimmi	Lefkimmi Municipal Stadium
Pallixouriakos	Lixouri	Lixouri Municipal Stadium
Panagriniakos	Agrinio	Agios Konstantinos Municipal Ground
Panegialios	Aigio	Aigio Municipal Stadium
Panachaiki	Patras	Kostas Davourlis Stadium
A.O. Plataria	Plataria	Plataria Municipal Ground
PAS Preveza	Preveza	Athanasia Tsoumeleka Municipal Stadium
Tilikratis	Lefkada	Lefkada Municipal Ground

=== First Phase Standings ===
Pos	Team	Pld	W	D	L	GF	GA	GD	Pts	Promotion or relegation
1	Panegialios	9	8	1	0	23	3	+20	25	Qualification for the promotion group
2	Panachaiki	9	8	0	1	26	3	+23	24	Qualification for the promotion group
3	PAS Preveza	9	7	1	1	16	6	+10	22	Qualification for the promotion group
4	Atromitos Patras	9	5	3	1	17	6	+11	18	Qualification for the promotion group
5	Panagriniakos	9	4	1	4	12	17	−5	13	Qualification for the promotion group
6	Pallixouriakos	9	4	1	4	15	16	−1	13	Qualification for the promotion group
7	Tilikratis	9	3	2	4	11	10	+1	11	Qualification for the relegation group
8	Aris Filiates	9	3	0	6	11	12	−1	9	Qualification for the relegation group
9	A.O. Plataria	9	2	3	4	8	13	−5	9	Qualification for the relegation group
10	OF Agios Matthaios	9	2	2	5	8	16	−8	8	Qualification for the relegation group
11	Lefkimmi	9	1	0	8	5	25	−20	3	Qualification for the relegation group
12	A.O. Levante	9	0	0	9	1	26	−25	0	Qualification for the relegation group

Updated to match(es) played on 22 November 2026. Source: Hellenic Football Federation: 2026-27 Standings (Group 6) (in Greek)
Rules for classification: 1) points; 2) head-to-head points; 3) head-to-head goal difference.

=== First Phase Results ===
Home \ Away	OFA	ARF	ATR	LEV	LEF	PAL	PAG	PAI	PAN	PLA	PRE	TIL
OF Agios Matthaios	—	0–2	0–2			1–2		0–4		2–2		
Aris Filiates		—		3–0				1–2	0–2	1–0		
Atromitos Patras		1–0	—	7–0	5–0			0–0			1–1	
A.O. Levante	1–2			—			0–1		0–1	0–1		
Lefkimmi	2–1				—	1–4	0–3	1–4				0–1
Pallixouriakos		3–2				—		0–1			1–2	3–1
Panagriniakos	1–1	3–2				4–0	—		0–5			
Panegialios				4–0			3–0	—	2–1			3–0
Panachaiki			5–0		4–0	3–1			—		2–0	
A.O. Plataria			0–1		1–0	1–1			0–3	—		2–2
PAS Preveza		1–0		4–0	2–1		2–0			3–1	—	
Tilikratis	0–1		0–0	3–0			4–0				0–1	—

Updated to match(es) played on 22 November 2026. Source: Hellenic Football Federation: 2026-27 Results (Group 6) (in Greek)
Legend: Blue = home team win; Yellow = draw; Red = away team win.

== Group 7 ==
=== Teams ===
Location of teams in Group 7 of the 2026–27 Gamma Ethniki

Team	Location	Ground
Asteras Amaliada	Amaliada	Amaliada Municipal Stadium
Asteras Vlachioti	Vlachioti	Vlachioti Municipal Stadium
Ermis Kiveri	Kiveri	Kiveri Municipal Ground
Iraklis Xylokastro	Xylokastro	Sotiris Angelopoulos Municipal Ground
P.A.S. Korinthos	Corinth	Corinth Municipal Stadium
Loutraki	Loutraki	Thodeio Stadium
Miltiadis Pyrgos Trifylia	Pyrgos Trifylia	Gargalianoi Municipal Ground
Panargiakos	Argos	Argos Municipal Stadium
Panthouriakos	Thouria	Stavros Papadopoulos Stadium
Panthyreatikos	Astros	Astros Municipal Ground
Pelopas Kiato	Kiato	Kiato Municipal Stadium
Telos Agras Gargalianoi	Gargalianoi	Gargalianoi Municipal Ground

=== First Phase Standings ===
Pos	Team	Pld	W	D	L	GF	GA	GD	Pts	Promotion or relegation
1	Loutraki	9	7	1	1	14	3	+11	22	Qualification for the promotion group
2	Pelopas Kiato	9	5	2	2	17	11	+6	17	Qualification for the promotion group
3	Asteras Amaliada	9	5	2	2	14	10	+4	17	Qualification for the promotion group
4	Miltiadis Pyrgos Trifylia	9	4	3	2	17	15	+2	15	Qualification for the promotion group
5	Iraklis Xylokastro	9	4	3	2	15	11	+4	15	Qualification for the promotion group
6	Panthouriakos	9	4	2	3	15	11	+4	14	Qualification for the promotion group
7	Panargiakos	9	2	7	0	11	8	+3	13	Qualification for the relegation group
8	Ermis Kiveri	9	2	3	4	8	13	−5	9	Qualification for the relegation group
9	P.A.S. Korinthos	9	2	2	5	11	18	−7	8	Qualification for the relegation group
10	Telos Agras Gargalianoi	9	1	3	5	12	14	−2	6	Qualification for the relegation group
11	Asteras Vlachioti	9	1	3	5	9	18	−9	6	Qualification for the relegation group
12	Panthyreatikos	9	1	1	7	6	17	−11	4	Qualification for the relegation group

Updated to match(es) played on 22 November 2026. Source: Hellenic Football Federation: 2026-27 Standings (Group 7) (in Greek)
Rules for classification: 1) points; 2) head-to-head points; 3) head-to-head goal difference.

=== First Phase Results ===
Home \ Away	ASA	ASV	ERM	IRX	KOR	LOU	MIL	PNA	PTH	PTY	PEL	TEL
Asteras Amaliada	—		1–0			0–1	3–1		3–1			2–1
Asteras Vlachioti	1–1	—				0–2		1–1				1–1
Ermis Kiveri			—		2–2				0–2	3–1	0–4	1–0
Iraklis Xylokastro	4–2	3–1	0–0	—	2–1						0–0	
P.A.S. Korinthos	1–2	2–1			—		3–1	1–1				
Loutraki				2–1		—			4–0		2–0	1–0
Miltiadis Pyrgos Trifylia			3–2	4–2		1–0	—	1–1		3–1		
Panargiakos			0–0			1–1		—		2–1	3–1	
Panthouriakos		4–0		1–1	4–0			0–0	—			
Panthyreatikos	0–0	1–2		0–2		0–1			2–1	—		
Pelopas Kiato		3–2			2–1		1–1			3–0	—	3–2
Telos Agras Gargalianoi					3–0		2–2	2–2	1–2			—

Updated to match(es) played on 22 November 2026. Source: Hellenic Football Federation: 2026-27 Results (Group 7) (in Greek)
Legend: Blue = home team win; Yellow = draw; Red = away team win.

== Group 8 ==
=== Teams ===
Location of teams in Group 8 of the 2026–27 Gamma Ethniki
Location of the Athens and Piraeus teams in Group 8 of the 2026–27 Gamma Ethniki

Team	Location	Ground
Amfiali	Amfiali	Sitapothikes Municipal Ground
Apollon Kalythies	Kalythies	Kalythies Municipal Ground
Apollon Smyrnis	Rizoupoli	Georgios Kamaras Stadium
AER Afantou	Afantou	Afantou Municipal Ground
Diagoras	Rhodes	Diagoras Stadium
Doxa Vyronas	Vyronas	Vyronas Municipal Stadium
Egaleo	Egaleo	Stavros Mavrothalassitis Stadium
Ethnikos Piraeus	Piraeus	Moschato Municipal Ground
Ialysos	Ialysos	Oikonomideio Ground
Ionikos	Nikaia	Neapoli Stadium
Proodeftiki	Nikaia	Nikaia Municipal Ground
P.A.O. Rouf	Rouf, Athens	Dimitris Giannakopoulos Municipal Ground

=== First Phase Standings ===
Pos	Team	Pld	W	D	L	GF	GA	GD	Pts	Promotion or relegation
1	Egaleo	9	7	1	1	15	7	+8	22	Qualification for the promotion group
2	Doxa Vyronas	9	7	1	1	14	3	+11	22	Qualification for the promotion group
3	Apollon Smyrnis	9	7	0	2	18	8	+10	21	Qualification for the promotion group
4	Diagoras	9	5	2	2	11	4	+7	17	Qualification for the promotion group
5	AER Afantou	9	4	3	2	5	4	+1	15	Qualification for the promotion group
6	Ethnikos Piraeus	9	3	2	4	10	8	+2	11	Qualification for the promotion group
7	P.A.O. Rouf	9	3	1	5	5	10	−5	10	Qualification for the relegation group
8	Proodeftiki	9	3	1	5	4	7	−3	10	Qualification for the relegation group
9	Apollon Kalythies	9	3	0	6	4	12	−8	9	Qualification for the relegation group
10	Ionikos	9	2	1	6	5	11	−6	7	Qualification for the relegation group
11	Ialysos	9	2	0	7	4	9	−5	6	Qualification for the relegation group
12	Amfiali	9	1	2	6	4	16	−12	5	Qualification for the relegation group

Updated to match(es) played on 22 November 2026. Source: Hellenic Football Federation: 2026-27 Standings (Group 8) (in Greek)
Rules for classification: 1) points; 2) head-to-head points; 3) head-to-head goal difference.

=== First Phase Results ===
Home \ Away	AMF	APK	APS	AER	DIA	DOV	EGA	ETH	IAL	ION	PRO	ROU
Amfiali	—		1–4	0–0	0–2		0–3		1–0			
Apollon Kalythies		—	1–0	0–1							1–0	1–0
Apollon Smyrnis			—				3–0	3–2	2–1		1–0	
AER Afantou				—			0–1		2–0	1–0	0–0	0–0
Diagoras		2–0	0–2	0–1	—			1–1				4–0
Doxa Vyronas	2–0	1–0	3–0			—			1–0			
Egaleo		4–1				2–2	—	1–0		2–1		
Ethnikos Piraeus	1–1			3–0		0–1		—		2–0	0–1	
Ialysos		2–0			0–1		0–1		—	1–0		
Ionikos	2–1	2–0			0–0	0–2				—		
Proodeftiki					0–1	0–2			1–0	2–0	—	0–2
P.A.O. Rouf	2–0		0–3			1–0	0–1	0–1				—

Updated to match(es) played on 22 November 2026. Source: Hellenic Football Federation: 2026-27 Results (Group 8) (in Greek)
Legend: Blue = home team win; Yellow = draw; Red = away team win.

== Group 9 ==
=== Teams ===
Location of teams in Group 9 of the 2026–27 Gamma Ethniki
Location of the Attica teams in Group 9 of the 2026–27 Gamma Ethniki

Team	Location	Ground
Asteras Magoula	Magoula	Magoula Municipal Ground
Acharnaikos	Acharnes	Acharnes Municipal Ground
Ethnikos Asteras	Kaisariani	Michalis Kritikopoulos Municipal Ground
Ilioupoli	Ilioupoli	Ilioupoli Municipal Stadium
Ilisiakos	Zografou	Grigoris Lamprakis Municipal Stadium
Thyella Rafina	Rafina	Panagiotis Skoufos Municipal Stadium
Asteras Vari	Vari	Vari Municipal Stadium
Mykonos	Mykonos	Korfos Municipal Stadium
Nea Ionia	Nea Ionia	Nea Ionia Municipal Stadium
Pannaxiakos	Naxos	Naxos Municipal Stadium
Saronikos Anavyssos	Anavyssos	Vari Municipal Stadium

=== First Phase Standings ===
Pos	Team	Pld	W	D	L	GF	GA	GD	Pts	Promotion or relegation
1	Asteras Vari	9	6	2	1	8	4	+4	20	Qualification for the promotion group
2	Ilisiakos	8	6	1	1	10	1	+9	19	Qualification for the promotion group
3	Pannaxiakos	8	4	3	1	13	7	+6	15	Qualification for the promotion group
4	Thyella Rafina	8	4	3	1	9	3	+6	15	Qualification for the promotion group
5	Nea Ionia	9	5	0	4	11	7	+4	15	Qualification for the promotion group
6	Asteras Magoula	8	4	2	2	5	2	+3	14	Qualification for the promotion group
7	Mykonos	8	4	1	3	11	4	+7	13	Qualification for the relegation group
8	Ilioupoli	8	2	3	3	8	10	−2	9	Qualification for the relegation group
9	Ethnikos Asteras	8	1	1	6	4	11	−7	4	Qualification for the relegation group
10	Saronikos Anavyssos	8	1	0	7	2	12	−10	3	Qualification for the relegation group
11	Acharnaikos	8	0	0	8	3	23	−20	0	Qualification for the relegation group

Updated to match(es) played on 22 November 2026. Source: Hellenic Football Federation: 2026-27 Standings (Group 9) (in Greek)
Rules for classification: 1) points; 2) head-to-head points; 3) head-to-head goal difference.

=== First Phase Results ===
Home \ Away	ASM	ACH	EAS	ILI	ILS	THR	ASV	MYK	NIO	PAN	SAR
Asteras Magoula	—		1–0			0–0				0–1	
Acharnaikos	0–2	—				0–4	1–2	0–3			
Ethnikos Asteras			—		0–1			0–3		2–3	
Ilioupoli	0–1	2–1	1–1	—			1–1				
Ilisiakos		2–0		2–0	—			1–0			2–0
Thyella Rafina				1–0	0–0	—	0–1		2–1	0–0	
Asteras Vari			1–0		0–2		—	1–0	1–0		1–0
Mykonos	0–0							—	1–2	1–0	3–0
Nea Ionia	0–1	4–0	1–0		1–0				—		
Pannaxiakos		4–1		3–3			0–0		2–0	—	
Saronikos Anavyssos	1–0		0–1	0–1		1–2			0–2		—

Updated to match(es) played on 22 November 2026. Source: Hellenic Football Federation: 2026-27 Results (Group 9) (in Greek)
Legend: Blue = home team win; Yellow = draw; Red = away team win.

== Group 10 ==
=== Teams ===
Location of teams in Group 10 of the 2026–27 Gamma Ethniki

Team	Location	Ground
Agios Nikolaos	Agios Nikolaos	Nikolaos Fourniotakis Municipal Stadium
Atsalenios	Heraklion	Atsalenio Municipal Ground
Chania City	Chania	Perivolia Municipal Stadium
Giouchtas	Archanes	Markomichalakeio Ground
Episkopi	Episkopi	Theodoros Vardinogiannis Ground
Ergotelis	Heraklion	Gazi Municipal Ground
A.E. Neapoli	Neapoli	Periklis Melidoniotis Municipal Stadium
Hersonissos	Hersonissos	Chersonisos Municipal Ground
Panakrotiriakos	Akrotiri	Mournies Municipal Ground
Platanias	Platanias	Perivolia Municipal Stadium
Rethymniakos	Rethymno	Sochora Municipal Ground
Tympaki	Tympaki	Tympaki Municipal Ground

=== First Phase Standings ===
Pos	Team	Pld	W	D	L	GF	GA	GD	Pts	Promotion or relegation
1	Chania City	9	7	2	0	24	6	+18	23	Qualification for the promotion group
2	Atsalenios	9	5	4	0	14	6	+8	19	Qualification for the promotion group
3	Giouchtas	9	4	5	0	19	5	+14	17	Qualification for the promotion group
4	Rethymniakos	9	5	1	3	17	10	+7	16	Qualification for the promotion group
5	Agios Nikolaos	9	4	3	2	14	8	+6	15	Qualification for the promotion group
6	Ergotelis	9	3	3	3	10	10	0	12	Qualification for the promotion group
7	Tympaki	9	3	2	4	7	10	−3	11	Qualification for the relegation group
8	Episkopi	9	3	1	5	6	13	−7	10	Qualification for the relegation group
9	Panakrotiriakos	9	2	3	4	7	13	−6	9	Qualification for the relegation group
10	Platanias	9	1	4	4	6	9	−3	7	Qualification for the relegation group
11	Hersonissos	9	1	3	5	5	20	−15	6	Qualification for the relegation group
12	A.E. Neapoli	9	0	1	8	2	21	−19	1	Qualification for the relegation group

Updated to match(es) played on 21 November 2026. Source: Hellenic Football Federation: 2026-27 Standings (Group 10) (in Greek)
Rules for classification: 1) points; 2) head-to-head points; 3) head-to-head goal difference.

=== First Phase Results ===
Home \ Away	AON	ATS	CHA	GIO	EPI	ERG	NEA	CHE	PAK	PLA	RET	TYM
Agios Nikolaos	—			1–1		0–1	2–0	3–0				2–0
Atsalenios	1–1	—			2–0	1–1			2–2		3–0	
Chania City	3–1	0–0	—				8–0			1–1		
Giouchtas				—	3–0		3–0	4–0		2–2	0–0	
Episkopi	1–3		1–2		—		1–0			1–0		2–0
Ergotelis			1–2	1–1		—	1–0				4–2	
A.E. Neapoli		0–1					—	1–1			1–3	0–1
Hersonissos			1–5			0–0		—	1–1			1–0
Panakrotiriakos			1–2	0–4	0–0	2–0			—			
Platanias	1–1	0–1						2–0	0–1	—	0–2	
Rethymniakos			0–1		3–0			4–1	3–0		—	
Tympaki		2–3		1–1		2–1			1–0	0–0		—

Updated to match(es) played on 21 November 2026. Source: Hellenic Football Federation: 2026-27 Results (Group 10) (in Greek)
Legend: Blue = home team win; Yellow = draw; Red = away team win.
