= 2017–18 Gamma Ethniki =

Gamma Ethniki
- Season: 2017–18

The 2017–18 Gamma Ethniki was the 35th season since the official establishment of the third tier of Greek football in 1983. It started on 1 October 2017. After matches were completed in the eight groups, the top team in each group qualified for a playoff round of two groups, to determine which four teams would be promoted to the Football League.

97 teams were divided into eight groups according to geographical criteria.

Panelefsiniakos, AO Chania, AEL Kalloni, Panthrakikos, Eordaikos, A.E. Istiaia, Mavroi Aetoi Eleftherochori, Amvrakia Kostakioi, APO Kanaris Nenita, Pyrsos Grevena, AO Syros, Poseidon Neoi Poroi and AO Polykratis Pythagoreio withdrew from the league before the group draw.

== Group 1 ==
=== Teams ===
Location of teams in Group 1 of 2017–18 Gamma Ethniki

Team	Location	Last season
Nestos Chrysoupoli	Chrysoupoli	Group 1, 4th
Doxa Proskinites	Proskinites	Group 1, 13th
Orfeas Xanthi	Xanthi	Group 1, 5th
Kavala	Kavala	Group 1, 6th
Apollon Paralimnio	Paralimnio	Group 1, 7th
A.E. Didymoteicho	Didymoteicho	Evros FCA champion
Doxa Neo Sidirochori	Neo Sidirochori	Thrace FCA champion
Megas Alexandros Xiropotamos	Xiropotamos	Drama FCA champion
Aetos Orfano	Ofrynio	Kavala FCA champion
Elpis Skoutari	Skoutari	Serres FCA 3rd promoted as Amateur Cup finalist
Megas Alexandros Karperi	Karperi	Serres FCA champion
Aris Avato	Avato	Xanthi FCA champion

=== Standings ===
Pos	Team	Pld	W	D	L	GF	GA	GD	Pts	Qualification or relegation
1	Apollon Paralimnio (C, Q)	22	15	3	4	38	13	+25	48	Qualification to promotion play-offs
2	Aetos Orfano	22	13	3	6	34	25	+9	42	
3	Kavala	22	12	5	5	35	19	+16	41	
4	Elpis Skoutari	22	11	6	5	31	19	+12	39	
5	Aris Avato	22	8	8	6	21	17	+4	32	
6	Nestos Chrysoupoli	22	9	5	8	23	16	+7	32	
7	Orfeas Xanthi	22	9	5	8	30	25	+5	32	
8	A.E. Didymoteicho (R)	22	8	7	7	18	22	−4	31	Relegation to FCA championships
9	Megas Alexandros Xiropotamos (R)	22	6	3	13	18	32	−14	21	Relegation to FCA championships
10	Doxa Proskinites (R)	22	5	5	12	23	35	−12	20	Relegation to FCA championships
11	Doxa Neo Sidirochori (R)	22	5	4	13	18	40	−22	19	Relegation to FCA championships
12	Megas Alexandros Karperi (R)	22	2	4	16	14	39	−25	10	Relegation to FCA championships

Source: Hellenic Football Federation (in Greek)
Rules for classification: 1st points; 2nd head-to-head points; 3rd head-to-head goal difference
(C) Champions; (Q) Qualified for the phase indicated; (R) Relegated

== Group 2 ==
=== Teams ===
Location of teams in Group 2 of 2017–18 Gamma Ethniki

Team	Location	Last season
Pierikos	Katerini	Group 2, 10th
APE Langadas	Langadas	Group 1, 3rd
Kampaniakos	Chalastra	Group 1, 9th
AO Kardia	Kardia	Group 1, 10th
Almopos Aridea	Aridaea	Group 1, 12th
Naoussa	Naousa	Group 1, 8th
Makedonikos	Efkarpia	Macedonia FCA champion
Agrotikos Asteras	Evosmos	Football League, 6th
Kilkisiakos	Kilkis	Kilkis FCA champion
Edessaikos	Edessa	Pella FCA champion
Aris Palaiochori	Palaiochori	Chalkidiki FCA Champion
Megas Alexandros Trikala	Trikala Imathia	Imathia FCA champion
Philippos Alexandreia	Alexandreia	New Team after merged with Diagoras Sevasti
AE Karitsa	Karitsa	Pieria FCA, 2nd
Iraklis	Thessaloniki	Super League, 12th

=== Standings ===
Pos	Team	Pld	W	D	L	GF	GA	GD	Pts	Qualification or relegation
1	Iraklis (C, Q)	28	20	5	3	63	17	+46	65	Qualification to promotion play-offs
2	Aris Palaiochori	28	19	4	5	49	19	+30	61	
3	Makedonikos	28	13	8	7	32	21	+11	47	
4	Almopos Aridea	28	11	9	8	32	22	+10	42	
5	Edessaikos	28	10	11	7	30	28	+2	41	
6	Pierikos	28	11	7	10	25	29	−4	40	
7	Agrotikos Asteras	28	11	7	10	35	39	−4	40	
8	APE Langadas	28	10	9	9	46	33	+13	39	
9	Naoussa (R)	28	10	9	9	30	29	+1	39	Relegation to FCA championships
10	AO Kardia (R)	28	12	3	13	38	33	+5	37 (Note: AO Kardia deducted two points for this season by Hellenic Football Federation.)	Relegation to FCA championships
11	Kilkisiakos (R)	28	10	7	11	31	32	−1	37	Relegation to FCA championships
12	AE Karitsa (R)	28	6	10	12	27	39	−12	28	Relegation to FCA championships
13	Megas Alexandros Trikala (R)	28	6	7	15	22	47	−25	25	Relegation to FCA championships
14	Philippos Alexandreia (R)	28	4	6	18	17	56	−39	18	Relegation to FCA championships
15	Kampaniakos (R)	28	4	4	20	22	55	−33	16	Relegation to FCA championships

Source: Hellenic Football Federation (in Greek)
Rules for classification: 1st points; 2nd head-to-head points; 3rd head-to-head goal difference
(C) Champions; (Q) Qualified for the phase indicated; (R) Relegated

== Group 3 ==
=== Teams ===
Location of teams in Group 3 of 2017–18 Gamma Ethniki

Team	Location	Last season
Thesprotos	Igoumenitsa	Group 2, 9th
Tilikratis	Lefkada	Group 2, 7th
Ethnikos Filippiada	Filippiada	Group 2, 14th
Makedonikos Foufas	Foufas	Group 1, 11th
~~Kastoria~~	~~Kastoria~~	~~Kastoria FCA champion~~
Doxa Kranoula	Kranoula	Epirus FCA champion
Asteras Parapotamos	Parapotamos	Thesprotia FCA champion
Skoufas Kompoti	Kompoti	Arta FCA champion
Panlefkadios	Lefkada	Preveza-Lefkada FCA champion
A.E. Lefkimmi	Lefkimmi	Kerkyra FCA champion
Neos Amfilochos	Amfilochia	New Team after merged with Panamvrakikos Mpouka
AEP Karagiannia	Karagiannia	Kozani FCA champion
Ermis Amyntaio	Amyntaio	Florina FCA champion

=== Standings ===
Pos	Team	Pld	W	D	L	GF	GA	GD	Pts	Qualification or relegation
1	Tilikratis (C, Q)	24	15	6	3	41	15	+26	51	Qualification to promotion play-offs
2	N. Amfilochos	24	15	2	7	45	20	+25	47	
3	Makedonikos Foufas	24	14	4	6	31	18	+13	46	
4	Ermis Amyntaio	24	13	6	5	36	24	+12	45	
5	Thesprotos	24	11	9	4	38	15	+23	42	
6	A.E. Lefkimmi	24	12	5	7	32	23	+9	41	
7	Doxa Kranoula	24	10	7	7	25	22	+3	37	
8	AEP Karagiannia (R)	24	7	6	11	25	36	−11	27	Relegation to FCA championships
9	Ethnikos Filippiada (R)	24	7	6	11	18	28	−10	27	Relegation to FCA championships
10	Skoufas Kompoti (R)	24	4	9	11	15	29	−14	21	Relegation to FCA championships
11	Panlefkadios (R)	24	3	12	9	16	24	−8	21	Relegation to FCA championships
12	Asteras Parapotamos (R)	24	3	5	16	17	44	−27	14	Relegation to FCA championships
13	Kastoria (R)	24	2	3	19	10	51	−41	9 (Note: Kastoria withdrew from the league on 29 January 2018.)	Relegation to FCA championships

Source: Hellenic Football Federation (in Greek)
Rules for classification: 1st points; 2nd head-to-head points; 3rd head-to-head goal difference
(C) Champions; (Q) Qualified for the phase indicated; (R) Relegated

== Group 4 ==
=== Teams ===
Location of teams in Group 4 of 2017–18 Gamma Ethniki

Team	Location	Last season
Niki Volos	Nea Ionia Volos	Group 2, 6th
Olympiacos Volos 1937	Volos	Group 2, 3rd
Rigas Feraios	Velestino	Group 2, 11th
Thiva	Thiva	Group 3, 6th
Opountios	Martino	Phthiotis FCA champion
Achilleas Farsala	Farsala	Larissa FCA champion
Digenis Neochori	Oichalia	Trikala FCA champion
Almyros	Almyros	Thessaly FCA champion
APOK Velouchi	Karpenisi	Evrytania FCA champion
Asteras Itea	Itea	Phocis FCA champion
APO Amvrysseas	Distomo	Boeotia FCA champion
AO Sellana	Sellana	Karditsa FCA champion
Volos	Volos	New Team after merged with Pydna Kitros

=== Standings ===
Pos	Team	Pld	W	D	L	GF	GA	GD	Pts	Qualification or relegation
1	Volos (C, Q)	24	20	3	1	67	18	+49	63	Qualification to promotion play-offs
2	Niki Volos	24	13	7	4	36	12	+24	46	
3	Asteras Itea	24	12	5	7	38	23	+15	41	
4	Almyros	24	12	4	8	32	22	+10	40	
5	Olympiacos Volos 1937	24	11	6	7	28	15	+13	39	
6	APO Amvrysseas	24	11	4	9	30	26	+4	37	
7	AO Sellana	24	9	8	7	27	23	+4	35	
8	Rigas Feraios (R)	24	10	5	9	21	26	−5	35	Relegation to FCA championships
9	Thiva (R)	24	9	7	8	36	24	+12	34	Relegation to FCA championships
10	Digenis Neochori (R)	24	6	6	12	14	34	−20	24	Relegation to FCA championships
11	Achilleas Farsala (R)	24	5	5	14	17	37	−20	20	Relegation to FCA championships
12	Opountios (R)	24	4	4	16	21	53	−32	16	Relegation to FCA championships
13	APOK Velouchi (R)	24	2	0	22	18	72	−54	6	Relegation to FCA championships

Source: Hellenic Football Federation (in Greek)
Rules for classification: 1st points; 2nd head-to-head points; 3rd head-to-head goal difference
(C) Champions; (Q) Qualified for the phase indicated; (R) Relegated

== Group 5 ==
=== Teams ===
Location of teams in Group 5 of 2017–18 Gamma Ethniki

Team	Location	Last season
Achaiki	Kato Achaia	Group 3, 12th
PAO Varda	Varda	Group 3, 3rd
Asteras Amaliada	Amaliada	Group 3, 5th
Tsiklitiras Pylos	Pylos	Group 3, 13th
Panarkadikos	Tripoli	Group 3, 8th
Kalamata	Kalamata	Messinia FCA champion
Zakynthos	Zakynthos	Zakynthos FCA champion
Paniliakos	Pyrgos	Elis FCA champion
Pallixouriakos	Lixouri	Kefalonia-Ithaca FCA champion
Diagoras Vrachnaiika	Vrachnaiika	Achaea FCA champion
Asteras Vlachioti	Vlachioti	Laconia FCA champion
Leonidio	Leonidio	Arcadia FCA champion

=== Standings ===
Pos	Team	Pld	W	D	L	GF	GA	GD	Pts	Qualification or relegation
1	Asteras Amaliada (C, Q)	22	15	5	2	47	14	+33	50	Qualification to promotion play-offs
2	Asteras Vlachioti	22	13	6	3	40	16	+24	42 (Note: Asteras Vlachioti and Zakynthos were deducted three points)	
3	Paniliakos	22	11	6	5	32	17	+15	39	
4	Panarkadikos	22	10	6	6	32	17	+15	36	
5	Kalamata	22	7	13	2	24	15	+9	34	
6	Diagoras Vrachnaiika	22	10	3	9	33	31	+2	33	
7	PAO Varda	22	10	3	9	25	25	0	33	
8	Achaiki (R)	22	8	7	7	20	18	+2	31	Relegation to FCA championships
9	Zakynthos (R)	22	7	4	11	25	32	−7	22	Relegation to FCA championships
10	Tsiklitiras Pylos (R)	22	5	6	11	15	26	−11	21	Relegation to FCA championships
11	Pallixouriakos (R)	22	3	4	15	15	54	−39	13	Relegation to FCA championships
12	Leonidio (R)	22	0	3	19	8	51	−43	3	Relegation to FCA championships

Source: Hellenic Football Federation (in Greek)
Rules for classification: 1st points; 2nd head-to-head points; 3rd head-to-head goal difference
(C) Champions; (Q) Qualified for the phase indicated; (R) Relegated

== Group 6 ==
=== Teams ===
Location of teams in Group 6 of 2017–18 Gamma Ethniki

Team	Location	Last season
Ionikos	Nikaia	Group 4, 2nd
Ethnikos Piraeus	Piraeus	Group 4, 4th
Proodeftiki	Nikaia	Group 4, 6th
Rodos	Rhodes	Group 4, 10th
Ialysos	Ialysos	Group 4, 13th
Zevgolateio	Zevgolateio	Group 3, 14th
A.O.Loutraki	Loutraki	Group 3, 11th
Keratsini	Keratsini	Piraeus FCA champion
Pelopas Kiato	Kiato	Corinthia FCA champion
Diagoras	Rhodes	Dodecanese FCA champion
Enosi Panaspropyrgiakou Doxas	Aspropyrgos	West Attica FCA champion

=== Standings ===
Pos	Team	Pld	W	D	L	GF	GA	GD	Pts	Qualification or relegation
1	Ethnikos Piraeus (C, Q)	20	13	4	3	30	9	+21	43	Qualification to promotion play-offs
2	Proodeftiki	20	12	5	3	29	10	+19	41	
3	Ialysos	20	10	6	4	34	17	+17	36	
4	Diagoras	20	10	6	4	20	8	+12	36	
5	Keratsini	20	10	2	8	19	18	+1	32	
6	Enosi Panaspropyrgiakou Doxas	20	8	6	6	15	21	−6	30	
7	Ionikos	20	7	8	5	18	12	+6	29	
8	Rodos (R)	20	8	4	8	24	16	+8	28	Relegation to FCA championships
9	A.O.Loutraki (R)	20	5	4	11	16	23	−7	19	Relegation to FCA championships
10	Pelopas Kiato (R)	20	2	3	15	14	40	−26	9	Relegation to FCA championships
11	Zevgolateio (R)	20	1	0	19	3	48	−45	3	Relegation to FCA championships

Source: Hellenic Football Federation (in Greek)
Rules for classification: 1st points; 2nd head-to-head points; 3rd head-to-head goal difference
(C) Champions; (Q) Qualified for the phase indicated; (R) Relegated

== Group 7 ==
=== Teams ===
Location of teams in Group 7 of 2017–18 Gamma Ethniki

Team	Location	Last season
Enosi Ermionida	Kranidi	Group 3, 4th
Panargiakos	Argos	Group 3, 10th
Aiolikos	Mytilene	Group 3, 9th
Chalkida	Chalkida	Group 3, 2nd
Panthiraikos	Santorini	Group 4, 9th
Thyella Rafina	Rafina (Diastavrosi neighborhood)	Group 4, 12th
Triglia Rafina	Rafina	Group 4, 8th
Ermis Kiveri	Kiveri	Argolis FCA champion
Aittitos Spata	Spata	East Attica FCA champion
Diagoras Agia Paraskevi	Agia Paraskevi, Lesbos	Lesbos FCA champion
Tamyniakos	Aliveri	Euboea FCA champion

=== Standings ===
Pos	Team	Pld	W	D	L	GF	GA	GD	Pts	Qualification or relegation
1	Aittitos Spata (C, Q)	20	13	4	3	35	10	+25	43	Qualification to promotion play-offs
2	Chalkida	20	9	5	6	25	21	+4	32	
3	Panthiraikos	20	8	8	4	25	15	+10	32	
4	Enosi Ermionida	20	8	7	5	23	16	+7	31	
5	Aiolikos	20	8	6	6	21	17	+4	30	
6	Thyella Rafina	20	8	5	7	22	17	+5	29	
7	Panargiakos	20	7	6	7	16	22	−6	27	
8	Diagoras Agia Paraskevi (R)	20	7	4	9	18	22	−4	25	Relegation to FCA championships
9	Ermis Kiveri (R)	20	6	6	8	23	28	−5	24	Relegation to FCA championships
10	Triglia Rafina (R)	20	6	3	11	19	33	−14	21	Relegation to FCA championships
11	Tamyniakos (R)	20	2	2	16	12	38	−26	5 (Note: Tamyniakos were deducted three points)	Relegation to FCA championships

Source: Hellenic Football Federation (in Greek)
Rules for classification: 1st points; 2nd head-to-head points; 3rd head-to-head goal difference
(C) Champions; (Q) Qualified for the phase indicated; (R) Relegated

== Group 8 ==
=== Teams ===
Location of teams in Group 8 of 2017–18 Gamma Ethniki

Team	Location	Last season
Fostiras	Tavros	Group 3, 7th
Agios Ierotheos	Peristeri	Group 4, 3rd
A.E. Kifisia	Kifisia	Group 4, 11th
Ilisiakos	Zografou	Group 4, 14th
Ermis Zoniana	Zoniana	Group 4, 7th
Atsalenios	Heraklion (Atsalenio neighborhood)	Group 4, 5th
Irodotos	Nea Alikarnassos	Heraklion FCA champion
Egaleo	Egaleo	Athens FCA champion
OF Ierapetra	Ierapetra	Lasithi FCA champion
AE Mylopotamos	Mylopotamos	Rethymno FCA champion
Palaiochora	Palaiochora	Chania FCA champion

=== Standings ===
Pos	Team	Pld	W	D	L	GF	GA	GD	Pts	Qualification or relegation
1	Irodotos (C, Q)	20	13	5	2	30	12	+18	44	Qualification to promotion play-offs
2	Egaleo	20	11	3	6	31	22	+9	36	
3	OF Ierapetra	20	7	9	4	23	14	+9	30	
4	Ilisiakos	20	6	9	5	23	17	+6	27	
5	Atsalenios	20	7	6	7	16	19	−3	27	
6	Palaiochora	20	7	5	8	16	19	−3	26	
7	Agios Ierotheos	20	7	5	8	24	23	+1	26	
8	Fostiras (R)	20	5	7	8	16	18	−2	22	Relegation to FCA championships
9	A.E. Kifisia (R)	20	5	6	9	23	33	−10	21	Relegation to FCA championships
10	AE Mylopotamos (R)	20	4	7	9	19	27	−8	19	Relegation to FCA championships
11	Ermis Zoniana (R)	20	4	6	10	18	35	−17	15 (Note: Ermis Zoniana deducted three points for this season by Hellenic Football Federation.)	Relegation to FCA championships

Source: Hellenic Football Federation (in Greek)
Rules for classification: 1st points; 2nd head-to-head points; 3rd head-to-head goal difference
(C) Champions; (Q) Qualified for the phase indicated; (R) Relegated

== Promotion Playoffs ==
=== Group 1 ===
Pos	Team	Pld	W	D	L	GF	GA	GD	Pts	Promotion
1	Iraklis (P)	6	5	1	0	12	3	+9	16	Promotion to Football League
2	Volos (P)	6	4	1	1	8	5	+3	13	Promotion to Football League
3	Tilikratis	6	1	1	4	3	8	−5	4	
4	Apollon Paralimnio	6	0	1	5	0	7	−7	1	

Source: Hellenic Football Federation
Rules for classification: 1) points; 2) goal difference; 3) number of goals scored.
(P) Promoted

=== Group 2 ===
Pos	Team	Pld	W	D	L	GF	GA	GD	Pts	Promotion
1	Aittitos Spata (P)	6	3	2	1	7	5	+2	11	Promotion to Football League
2	Irodotos (P)	6	2	1	3	8	5	+3	7	Promotion to Football League
3	Asteras Amaliada	6	3	0	3	7	11	−4	4 (Note: Asteras Amaliada were deducted five points, due to fan behavior.)	
4	Ethnikos Piraeus	6	1	3	2	5	6	−1	3 (Note: Ethnikos Piraeus were deducted three points, due to fan behavior.)	

Source: Hellenic Football Federation
Rules for classification: 1) points; 2) goal difference; 3) number of goals scored.
(P) Promoted
