= Anastasios Papachristos =

Greek footballer

Tasos Papachristos
Personal information
- Full name: Anastasios Papachristos
- Date of birth: 5 March 1993 (age 33)
- Place of birth: Aigio, Greece
- Height: 1.75 m (5 ft 9 in)
- Position: Left-back

Team information
- Current team: Iraklis Xylokastro

Youth career
- Panionios

Senior career*
Years	Team	Apps	(Gls)
2010–2011	Nafpaktiakos Asteras		
2011–2012	Platanias		
2012	Rouvas	15	(0)
2012–2014	Panegialios	34	(2)
2014–2015	Asteras Tripolis	6	(0)
2015–2016	Panthrakikos	3	(0)
2016	Panegialios	15	(0)
2016–2017	Sparta	22	(0)
2017–2018	Panegialios	7	(0)
2018	Akropolis IF	7	(0)
2018–2020	Chania	28	(1)
2020–2023	Veria	37	(0)
2023–2025	PAS Korinthos		
2025–2026	Loutraki		
2026–	Iraklis Xylokastro		
- * Club domestic league appearances and goals as of 29 January 2023

Anastasios "Tasos" Papachristos (Greek: Αναστάσιος "Τάσος" Παπαχρήστος; born 5 March 1993) is a Greek professional footballer who plays as a left-back for Gamma Ethniki club Iraklis Xylokastro.
