= Christos Tzanis =

Greek footballer

Personal information
- Date of birth: 22 April 1985 (age 41)
- Place of birth: Parapotamos, Greece
- Height: 1.82 m (5 ft 11 1/2 in)
- Position: Forward

Senior career*
Years	Team	Apps	(Gls)
2003–2004	Asteras Parapotamos		
2004–2006	PAS Giannina	46	(5)
2006–2007	Anagennisi Arta	16	(6)
2007–2013	PAS Giannina	118	(14)
2013–2016	Panthrakikos	73	(14)
2016–2017	Apollon Smyrni	13	(1)
2017	Apollon Larissa	0	(0)
- * Club domestic league appearances and goals as of 25 April 2017

Christos Tzanis (Greek: Χρήστος Τζάνης; born 22 April 1985) is a Greek footballer.

== Career ==
Born in Parapotamos, Tzanis began playing football for local side Asteras Parapotamos in the Delta Ethniki. In 2004, he signed with nearby club PAS Giannina. He played eight years in total for the club, before he signed a one-year contract with Panthrakikos. On 9 October, during the match between Olympiacos and Panthrakikos Tzanis brought his A-game as he managed to lose except every opponent, a classic header as he swapped with his penalty and his own goal.

== Honours ==
- PAS Giannina
  - Greek Second Division: 2009,2011
