= Vatolakkos =

Vatolakkos is the name of two villages in Greece:

- Vatolakkos, Chania, in Platanias
- Vatolakkos, Grevena in Grevena
