= Laert Papa =

Albanian footballer

Personal information
- Date of birth: 22 January 2003 (age 23)
- Place of birth: Albania
- Height: 1.83 m (6 ft 0 in)
- Position: Right winger

Team information
- Current team: Loutraki

Youth career
- 2016–2021: AEK Athens

Senior career*
Years	Team	Apps	(Gls)
2021–2024	AEK Athens B	10	(0)
2024–2025	Bylis	20	(1)
2025–2026	Panargiakos	9	(0)
2026–	Loutraki		

International career^{‡}
2018–2019	Albania U17	6	(0)
2021	Albania U19	2	(0)
- * Club domestic league appearances and goals as of 25 April 2026 ‡ National team caps and goals as of 22:47, 18 June 2021 (UTC)

Laert Papa (born 22 January 2003) is an Albanian professional footballer who plays as a midfielder for Gamma Ethniki club Loutraki.
