= Petros Bakoutsis =

Greek footballer (born 2001)

Personal information
- Date of birth: 29 June 2001 (age 25)
- Place of birth: Thessaloniki, Greece
- Height: 1.80 m (5 ft 11 in)
- Position: Midfielder

Team information
- Current team: MPAM

Youth career
- 2013–2018: Aris

Senior career*
Years	Team	Apps	(Gls)
2018–2020	Aris	8	(0)
2020–2021	Olympiacos	0	(0)
2020–2021	→ Aris (loan)	1	(0)
2021–2022	Almopos Aridea	27	(0)
2022	Minyor Pernik	9	(0)
2023	Irodotos	5	(0)
2023–2024	Spartak Pleven	32	(2)
2025–	MPAM		
- * Club domestic league appearances and goals as of 29 February 2024

Petros Bakoutsis (Greek: Πέτρος Μπακούτσης; born 29 June 2001) is a Greek professional footballer who plays as a midfielder for Gamma Ethniki club MPAM.
