= Niki Polygyros F.C. =

Association football club in Greece

Niki Polygyros
- Full name: Athlitikos Syllogos Niki Polygyros
- Founded: 1950; 76 years ago
- Ground: Polygyros Municipal Stadium
- Capacity: 3,500
- Chairman: Michalis Giouvanakis
- Manager: Vangelis Pitkas
- League: Chalkidiki FCA First Division
- 2025–26: Chalkidiki FCA First Division, 3rd
| Home colours | Away colours |

Niki Polygyros Football Club (Greek: Αθλητικός Σύλλογος Νίκη Πολυγύρου) is a Greek football club based in Polygyros, Chalkidiki. Founded in 1950, its official colors are green and white.

== History ==
Niki Polygyros was founded in 1950 by Giorgos Mylonas, Dimitris Chatzichristos, Takis Palamidas, Nikos Korentis, and Michalis Vogiatzis. The club's colors since its foundation have been green and white.

From 1950 to 1967, the club competed in various unofficial championships and played friendly matches against the few existing teams of the Chalkidiki prefecture as well as several historic clubs from Thessaloniki. In 1964, in a competition featuring just five teams (Niki Polygyros, P.O. Moudania, Aris Palaiochori, Apollon Arnaia, and Doxa Ormylia), the club won its first championship unbeaten. In 1968, when the first official Chalkidiki FCA championship was held, it won the title again along with the Fair Play Cup. Its greatest success came on 17 June 1973, when—after 22 local matches and 8 in the special promotion championship—it defeated Macedonia FCA champions APE Langadas 2–0 at a packed Polygyros Stadium to earn unbeaten promotion to the Beta Ethniki. In its first and only appearance in the Beta Ethniki, it achieved several historic victories.

In 1975, following its relegation from the Beta Ethniki, the club was crowned Chalkidiki FCA champion for the fourth time, while in 1976 it won its first cup title against Propontida Neos Marmaras (2–1) at the Nea Moudania Stadium. In the Greek Amateur Cup, after advancing past Olympiakos Loutraki in the quarter-finals, it reached the semi-finals before being eliminated in Nea Ionia by Niki Volos (3–0).

In 1980, after winning its fifth championship, the club was promoted to the Gamma Ethniki following a 3–1 play-off victory against P.O. Nea Kallikrateia at Moudania Stadium. Three years later, in a dramatic cup final at the same venue against the same opponent, Niki Polygyros won its second cup title, prevailing 8–7 on penalties after a 1–1 draw in regular time.

In 1984, following a 23-match unbeaten streak, the club defeated the Southern Group champions P.O. Nea Kallikrateia (1–0) once again, claiming its sixth championship and representing the prefecture for the second time in the Gamma Ethniki.

In 2005, after twenty years of effort, the club won the title for the seventh time, subsequently competing in the Delta Ethniki. In the 2006–07 season, the club finished fifth in the Delta Ethniki, while in the final held in Arnaia, it celebrated its fourth cup title. In the 2007–08 season, the team finished second in the Delta Ethniki, just three points behind Makedonikos, having led the standings for much of the campaign and claimed the unofficial title of "winter champions". In the Chalkidiki FCA Cup final, once again held at Arnaia Stadium, the club celebrated its fifth cup title (and third consecutive) by defeating Akanthos Ierissos 4–0. The highlight of the season, however, was reaching the final of the Greek Amateur Cup, where the club was defeated 3–0 by Panargiakos at Lamia Municipal Stadium.

In 2011, following six consecutive seasons in the Delta Ethniki, the club entered the Chalkidiki First Division, where it has competed ever since.

In 2025, following a remarkable campaign in which it trailed first place by 10 points in December, the club defied expectations to overturn the deficit and capture the Chalkidiki FCA title.

== Crest and colours ==
The central element of the club's crest is the goddess Nike. Its official colours are green and white.

== Honours ==
=== National ===
- Greek FCA Winners' Championship
  - Winners (1): 1973 (Group 2)

=== Regional ===
- Chalkidiki FCA First Division
  - Winners (9): 1962–63, 1963–64, 1968–69, 1972–73, 1974–75, 1979–80, 1983–84, 2004–05, 2024–25
- Chalkidiki FCA Cup
  - Winners (7): 1972–73, 1975–76, 1982–83, 2005–06, 2006–07, 2007–08, 2008–09
- Chalkidiki FCA Super Cup
  - Winners (2): 2007, 2008
