= Vangelis Pitkas =

Greek footballer

Personal information
- Full name: Evangelos Pitkas
- Date of birth: 30 July 1983 (age 43)
- Place of birth: Serres, Greece
- Height: 1.90 m (6 ft 3 in)
- Position: Goalkeeper

Team information
- Current team: Niki Polygyros (manager)

Youth career
- Megas Alexandros Karperi
- –2001: Udinese
- 2002–2003: Iraklis

Senior career*
Years	Team	Apps	(Gls)
2003–2004	Nea Kallikratia		
2004–2005	Kilkisiakos		
2005–2008	Aiolikos	33	(0)
2008–2011	Anagennisi Karditsa	24	(0)
2011	Tilikratis	2	(0)
2012	Oikonomos Tsaritsani	24	(0)
2012–2013	Panachaiki	32	(0)
2013–2014	Paniliakos	23	(0)
2014–2015	Apollon Smyrnis	11	(0)
2015–2016	Panegialios	12	(0)
2016–2018	Lamia	43	(0)
2018	Doxa Drama	4	(0)
2019	Volos	8	(0)
2019–2021	Rodos	29	(0)
2021–2023	Apollon Pontus	53	(0)

Managerial career
- 2023–2025: Niki Polygyros (goalkeeping coach)
- 2025–2026: Apollon Kalamarias (goalkeeping coach)
- 2026–: Niki Polygyros
- * Club domestic league appearances and goals as of 15 June 2023

Vangelis Pitkas (Greek: Βαγγέλης Πίτκας; born 30 July 1983) is a Greek former professional footballer who played as a goalkeeper and currently the manager of Chalkidiki FCA First Division club Niki Polygyros.

== Career ==
Born in Serres, Pitkas began playing football in the Delta Ethniki with Nea Kallikratia. He would play in the third level of Greek football with Aiolikos before joining second level Anagennisi Karditsa.

On 31 August 2019 it was confirmed that Pitkas had joined Rodos.

== Personal life ==
Pitkas hails from Karperi, Serres.
