= Asteras Amaliada F.C. =

Greek football club

Asteras Amaliada
- Full name: Αθλητικός Όμιλος Αστέρας Αμαλιάδας
- Founded: 1947; 79 years ago
- Ground: Municipal Stadium of Amaliada
- Capacity: 3,000
- Chairman: Konstantinos Papadakos
- Manager: Georgios Koutsis
- League: Gamma Ethniki
- 2025–26: Elis FCA First Division, 1st (promoted)
- Website: http://asterasamaliadas.gr/
Home colours	Away colours

Asteras Amaliada Football Club (Greek: Αθλητικός Όμιλος Αστέρας Αμαλιάδας) is a Greek football club, based in Amaliada, Elis.

The club was founded in 1947. They will play in Gamma Ethniki for the season 2026–27.

== History ==
The team was founded in 1947 with the name "White Aster". In 1962 the team merged with Ethnikos Amaliada and created Korivos. Five years later, in 1967 the "White" was removed from the name of the club and then continues under the name Asteras Amaliada F.C..

== Honours ==
=== Domestic ===
- Gamma Ethniki: 1
  - 2017–18
- Elis FCA Champions: 13
  - 1971–72, 1973–74, 1976–77, 1979–80, 1987–88, 1994–95, 1996–97, 1999–00, 2006–07, 2009–10, 2014–15, 2015–16, 2025–26
- Elis FCA Cup Winners: 14
  - 1983–84, 1985–86, 1990–91, 1994–95, 1997–98, 1998–99, 1999–00, 2000–01, 2001–02, 2002–03, 2003–04, 2009–10, 2014–15, 2017–18
- Elis FCA Super Cup Winners: 4
  - 2010, 2011, 2016, 2026

== Notable players ==
- (Greece) Anastasios Kyriakos
- (Greece) Dimitris Arvanitis
- (Greece) Giannis Dintsikos
- (Greece) Giorgos Bountopoulos
- (Greece) Konstantinos Banousis
- (Greece) Mattheos Maroukakis
- (Greece) Stavros Stathakis
- (Greece) Theodoros Papadopoulos
- (Greece) Vasilios Rovas
- (Greece) Zacharias Kavousakis
- (Cameroon) Jacques Alberto Ngwem
- (Ivory Coast) Marco Zoro
- (Senegal) Cheikh Gadiaga
