= Vangelis Kerthi =

Greek footballer (born 1999)

Personal information
- Full name: Evangelos Kerthi
- Date of birth: 26 July 1999 (age 27)
- Place of birth: Greece
- Height: 1.82 m (6 ft 0 in)
- Position: Defensive midfielder

Team information
- Current team: Anagennisi Karditsa
- Number: 6

Senior career*
Years	Team	Apps	(Gls)
2018–2021	Kavala	38	(1)
2021–2023	Almopos Aridea	53	(0)
2023–	Anagennisi Karditsa	0	(0)
- * Club domestic league appearances and goals as of 15 June 2023

Vangelis Kerthi (Greek: Βαγγέλης Κέρθι; born 26 July 1999) is a Greek professional footballer who plays as a defensive midfielder for Super League 2 club Anagennisi Karditsa.
