= Jasminko Velić =

Bosnian football manager and player (born 1965)

Personal information
- Full name: Jasminko Velić
- Date of birth: September 1, 1965 (age 61)
- Place of birth: Sarajevo, SFR Yugoslavia
- Height: 1.82 m (6 ft 0 in)
- Position: Attacking midfielder

Team information
- Current team: Loutraki (manager)

Senior career*
Years	Team	Apps	(Gls)
1983–1984	Sarajevo	1	(0)
1988–1992	Željezničar Sarajevo	64	(8)
1992–1995	OFI	74	(6)
1995–1996	Kastoria	19	(4)
1996–1998	Estrela Amadora	30	(3)
1998–1999	Leganés	7	(0)
Total		195	(21)

Managerial career
- 2001–2002: AEK Athens (assistant)
- 2002–2003: Panathinaikos (assistant)
- 2003–2004: Sporting CP (assistant)
- 2004–2005: AEK Athens (assistant)
- 2006: Panathinaikos
- 2007–2009: Panathinaikos (technical director)
- 2012–2013: Levadiakos
- 2014–2015: Episkopi
- 2015–2016: Ergotelis
- 2019–2022: Episkopi
- 2022: Panathinaikos B
- 2022–2023: Levadiakos
- 2026–: Loutraki
- * Club domestic league appearances and goals

Jasminko Velić (born 1 September 1965) is a Bosnian professional football manager and former player.

In the 2006-2007 season, Velić was hired as a scouter for Panathinaikos, but after the sacking of Hans Backe, he was appointed as head coach for three games, from 15 September to 6 October, winning two of them and earning one draw. The next season, Velić was appointed technical director of Panathinaikos. In the 2007-2009 period Velić worked as a technical manager next to head coaches José Peseiro and Henk ten Cate, helping the club to make its return to the UEFA Champions League Group stages. During these two years, the club managed to reach its highest position ever in the UEFA club rankings (19th).

== Career ==
=== Playing career ===
Velić was born in Sarajevo and played for Sarajevo club Željezničar before moving to Greece in 1992. Velic was one of the youngest players ever in the history of Sarajevo to make a debut in the Yugoslavian Football League at the age of 18. He spent three seasons at OFI where he was part of the most successful OFI team ever, becoming one of the best foreign players to play for the club. He then spent one season (1995-1996) at Kastoria. He then moved to Portugal and played for two seasons for Estrela Amadora (1996-1998). He then moved to Spain before ending his career at CD Leganés (1998-1999).

=== Coaching career ===
Velić began his coaching career as assistant manager to Fernando Santos. Their collaboration began at AEK Athens in the 2001-2002 season, and continued at Panathinaikos (2002-2003) and Sporting CP (2003-2004), before they returned for a second spell at AEK Athens (2004-2005).

In the 2006-2007 season, Velić was hired as a scouter for Panathinaikos, but after the sacking of Hans Backe, he managed the Club as a head coach for three games (15/9/2006 to 6/10/2006 - 2 wins, 1 draw). The next season, Velić was appointed technical director of Panathinaikos. In the 2007-2009 period, with Velić as a technical coach next to head coaches José Peseiro and Henk ten Cate club made its return to the Champions League group stages. During these two years, the club managed to reach its highest position ever in the UEFA team rankings (19th).

In March 2013, Velić replaced Georgios Paraschos as manager for Levadiakos. During his spell, he helped the club remain in the top flight of Greek football.

In January 2015, he was appointed head coach of Football League side Episkopi. From January onward, Velić helped the club recover an 8 point deficit to enter the relegation play-offs, where the club played to remain in the Division.

On August 5, 2015, Velić was appointed head coach of fellow Cretan Football League club Ergotelis. He left in October, due to the club's poor financial situation, which left no room for transfers aligned to his instructions, as well as Ergotelis' rough start (1−1−2) during its 2015–16 Football League campaign.

In June 2019, Velić and Episkopi reached an agreement for his return to the club, aiming at bringing Episkopi to the highest tiers of Greek football. During the 2019-20 season, Velic led Episkopi to promotion with an undefeated league record, recording 11 wins, 5 draws, and 0 losses. Episkopi was the only Greek club to end the season undefeated. The following season, in 2020/21, Velic led Episkopi to a 2nd position league finish in the Greek Football League, resulting to a second consecutive promotion. Velic became one of the only head coaches in Greek football history to achieve multiple league promotions.

== Managerial statistics ==
As of 15 February 2023

Team	Nat	From	To	Record				
Team	Nat	From	To	G	W	D	L	Win %
Panathinaikos (caretaker)	(Greece)	15 September 2006	6 October 2006	3	2	1	0	66.67
Levadiakos	(Greece)	22 March 2013	25 April 2013	4	1	1	2	25.00
Episkopi	(Greece)	27 January 2015	28 July 2015	21	5	4	12	23.81
Ergotelis	(Greece)	5 August 2015	21 October 2015	4	1	1	2	25.00
Episkopi	(Greece)	1 July 2019	30 June 2022	73	34	24	15	46.58
Panathinaikos B	(Greece)	1 July 2022	22 September 2022	0	0	0	0	—
Levadiakos	(Greece)	22 September 2022	15 February 2023	20	3	5	12	15.00
Total				125	46	36	43	36.80
