= Spyros Fourlanos =

Greek footballer (born 1993)

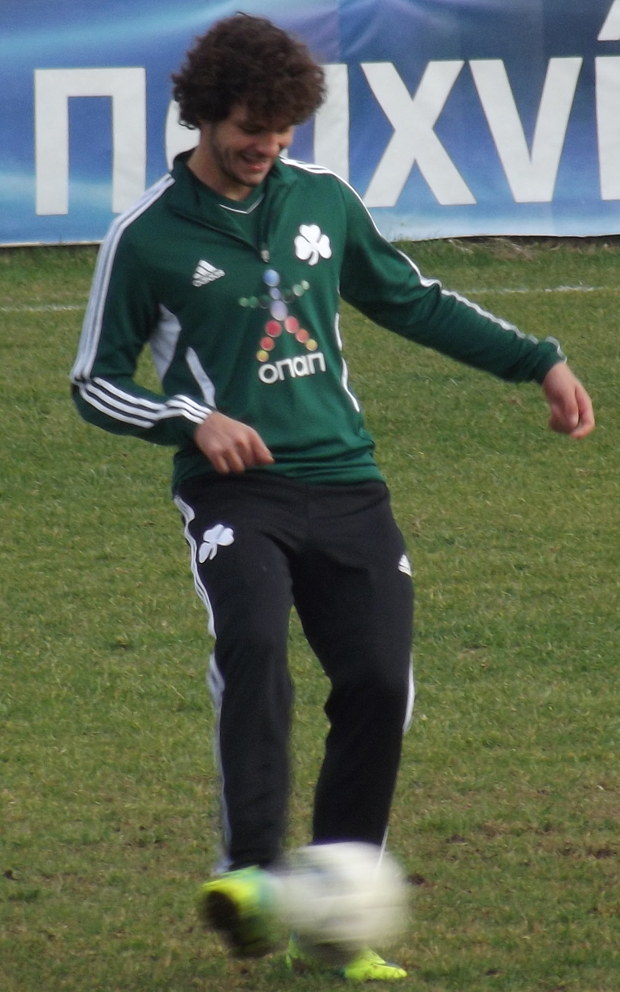

Personal information
- Full name: Spyridon Fourlanos
- Date of birth: 19 November 1993 (age 32)
- Place of birth: Athens, Greece
- Height: 1.85 m (6 ft 1 in)
- Position: Midfielder

Team information
- Current team: Loutraki

Youth career
- 2004–2011: Panathinaikos

Senior career*
Years	Team	Apps	(Gls)
2011–2013	Panathinaikos	8	(0)
2013–2014	Club Brugge	0	(0)
2014	→ AEL Kalloni (loan)	8	(0)
2014	Panionios	0	(0)
2015	Panachaiki	9	(0)
2015–2016	Sonnenhof Großaspach	0	(0)
2016–2017	Chania	30	(1)
2017–2019	Panachaiki	37	(0)
2019–2022	Ionikos	25	(0)
2022	Asteras Vlachioti	18	(2)
2022–2023	Egaleo	24	(2)
2023–2025	Ilioupoli	49	(2)
2025–2026	Chania	11	(0)
2026	Marko	12	(0)
2026–	Loutraki		

International career
2010–2011	Greece U17	4	(0)
2011–2012	Greece U19	19	(2)
2013	Greece U20	7	(0)
2012–2014	Greece U21	3	(0)
- * Club domestic league appearances and goals as of 30 July 2026

Spyros Fourlanos (Greek: Σπύρος Φουρλάνος, born 19 November 1993) is a Greek professional footballer who plays as a midfielder for Gamma Ethniki club Loutraki.

== Career ==
Fourlanos comes from Panathinaikos's youth ranks.

On 27 November 2011, during a Super League match vs. OFI, he made his debut for the men's team of Panathinaikos coming on as a substitute.

On 15 May 2013, he agreed a transfer to Club Brugge. On 31 December 2013 he was loaned from Club Brugge to AEL Kalloni for 6 months. The 20–year–old midfielder had agreed to a six–month loan deal as he wanted to be playing first team football more regularly.

In June 2014, he signed with Greek Super League club Panionios, but after six months he signed with Panachaiki, on a 2.5 years contract. On 17 November 2015, after having been a free agent, he signed for German 3. Liga side Sonnenhof Großaspach until 2017. On 28 August 2016, he signed with Chania for an undisclosed fee. On 29 January 2017, he scored his first goal in his professional career in a 4–0 home win against AEL Kalloni. On 25 August 2017, he re–signed with his former club Panachaiki.

== Career statistics ==
As of 5 March 2024

Appearances and goals by club, season and competition
Club	Season	League			Cup		Continental		Total	
Club	Season	Division	Apps	Goals	Apps	Goals	Apps	Goals	Apps	Goals
Panathinaikos	2011–12	Super League Greece	3	0	0	0	—		3	0
Panathinaikos	2012–13	Super League Greece	5	0	2	0	1	0	8	0
Panathinaikos	Total									
Club Brugge	2013–14	Belgian First Division A	0	0	0	0	0	0	0	0
AEL Kalloni	2013–14	Super League Greece	8	0	1	0	—		9	0
Panionios	2014–15	Super League Greece	0	0	1	0	—		1	0
Panachaiki	2014–15	Gamma Ethniki	9	0	0	0	—		9	0
SG Sonnenhof Großaspach	2015–16	3. Liga	0	0	0	0	—		0	0
Chania	2016–17	Gamma Ethniki	30	1	3	0	—		33	1
Panachaiki	2017–18	Gamma Ethniki	17	0	2	0	—		19	0
Panachaiki	2018–19	Gamma Ethniki	20	0	2	0	—		22	0
Panachaiki	Total		37	0	4	0	0	0	41	0
Ionikos	2020–21	Super League Greece 2	5	0	0	0	—		5	0
Asteras Vlachioti	2021–22	Super League Greece 2	18	2	0	0	—		18	2
Egaleo	2022–23	Super League Greece 2	24	2	0	0	—		24	2
Ilioupoli	2023–24	Super League Greece 2	20	1	0	0	—		20	1
Career total			150	6	11	0	1	0	92	1
