= Georgios Karaisaridis =

Greek footballer

Personal information
- Full name: Georgios Karaisaridis
- Date of birth: 2 April 1971 (age 55)
- Place of birth: Brussels, Belgium
- Height: 1.83 m (6 ft 0 in)
- Position: Defender

Senior career*
Years	Team	Apps	(Gls)
–1997	Edessaikos		
1997	Kalamata		
1998–1999	Kavala		
1999–2000	Panionios		
2000	Kavala		
2001	Athinaikos		
2001–2002	Kerkyra		
2002–2003	Veria		
2006–2007	Edessaikos		

Managerial career
- 2020–2022: Almopos Aridea (assistant)
- 2022–2023: Edessaikos
- 2024–2025: Panedessaikos
- * Club domestic league appearances and goals

Georgios Karaisaridis (Greek: Γεώργιος Καραϊσαρίδης; born 2 April 1971) is a retired Greek football defender.
