= Dimitrios Arvanitis =

Greek footballer (born 1980)

Personal information
- Full name: Dimitrios Arvanitis
- Date of birth: 9 August 1980 (age 46)
- Place of birth: Amaliada, Greece
- Height: 1.81 m (5 ft 11 in)
- Position: Centre back

Senior career*
Years	Team	Apps	(Gls)
2001–2004	Paniliakos	46	(3)
2004–2009	OFI	61	(0)
2009–2010	Olympiacos Volos	20	(0)
2010–2011	Ionikos	28	(1)
2011–2013	Kallithea	62	(4)
2013–2015	Olympiacos Volos	45	(0)
2015–2017	Panelefsiniakos	15	(0)
2017–2018	Asteras Amaliada	13	(0)
2018–2019	Paniliakos	23	(0)
2019–2020	Aias Gastouni	15	(0)
2020–2021	Asteras Amaliada		
- * Club domestic league appearances and goals

Dimitrios Arvanitis (Greek: Δημήτριος Αρβανίτης; born 9 August 1980) is a Greek former footballer who played as a centre back.

== Club career ==
Arvanitis previously played in the Super League Greece with Paniliakos, OFI and Olympiacos Volos. He also played for Ionikos, Kallithea, Panelefsiniakos, Asteras Amaliada, Paniliakos and Aias Gastouni.
