= Pella Football Clubs Association =

Association football governing body in Pella Prefecture, Greece

- Full name: Pella Football Clubs Association; Greek: Ένωση Ποδοσφαιρικών Σωματείων Πέλλας
- Short name: Pella F.C.A.; Greek: Ε.Π.Σ. Πέλλας
- Founded: 1971; 55 years ago
- Headquarters: Edessa, Greece
- FIFA affiliation: Hellenic Football Federation
- President: Asterios Antoniou
- Website: epspellas.gr

Pella Football Clubs Association (Greek: Ένωση Ποδοσφαιρικών Σωματείων Πέλλας) is the governing body of association football in the regional unit of Pella, Greece. Based in Edessa, it is a member of the Hellenic Football Federation (HFF). It is responsible for organizing local league championships and the local Cup, as well as youth championships. It also coordinates the regional representative teams (Youth and Children), which compete at the national level.

== History ==
Pella Football Clubs Association was officially founded in 1971 by 25 local clubs. Prior to its establishment, teams from the region competed in the tournaments of the Central-Western Macedonia Football Clubs Association. The founding assembly took place on 21 March 1971 with the participation of 25 founding clubs. The official local league championships and the Pella FCA Cup began operating in the 1972–73 season.

== League ==
The structure of the Pella FCA championships is as follows:

- A1 Category
- A Category
- B Category
  - Group A
  - Group B

=== Champions ===
Season	Champion
1972–73	Aris Palaifyto
1973–74	Apollon Krya Vrysi
1974–75	Apollon Krya Vrysi
1975–76	Edessaikos
1976–77	Edessaikos
1977–78	Anagennisi Giannitsa
1978–79	Niki Axos
1979–80	PAOK Aravissos
1980–81	Aetos Skydra
1981–82	Apollon Krya Vrysi & Elpida Edessa
1982–83	Ethnikos Giannitsa
1983–84	Niki Axos
1984–85	Aris Profitis Ilias
1985–86	Apollon Krya Vrysi
1986–87	Aetos Skydra
1987–88	Almopos Aridea
1988–89	Aetos Skydra & Apollon Krya Vrysi
1989–90	Niki Axos & Aris Profitis Ilias
1990–91	Aristotelis Loutrochori & Olympiacos Galatades
1991–92	Aetos Skydra & Ethnikos Giannitsa
1992–93	Aetos Skydra & Filippos Giannitsa
1993–94	Aris Palaifyto
1994–95	Aris Profitis Ilias
1995–96	Iraklis Edessa
1996–97	Aris Palaifyto
1997–98	Doxa Mandalo
1998–99	Niki Axos
1999–00	Almopos Aridea
2000–01	Almopos Aridea
2001–02	Mavroi Aetoi Paralimni
2002–03	Edessaikos
2003–04	Anagennisi Giannitsa
2004–05	Apollon Krya Vrysi
2005–06	Edessaikos
2006–07	Olympiacos Galatades
2007–08	Aetos Skydra
2008–09	Edessaikos
2009–10	Megas Alexandros Neos Mylotopos
2010–11	PAOK Giannitsa
2011–12	Megas Alexandros Neos Mylotopos
2012–13	Almopos Aridea
2013–14	Olympiacos Galatades
2014–15	Apollon Krya Vrysi
2015–16	Almopos Aridea
2016–17	Edessaikos
2017–18	Doxa Mavrovouni
2018–19	Thyella Sarakinoi
2019–20	Ethnikos Giannitsa
2020–21	Cancelled
2021–22	Ethnikos Giannitsa
2022–23	Mavri Thyella Lykostomo
2023–24	Apollon Krya Vrysi
2024–25	PAOK Dytiko
2025–26	Panedessaikos

=== Performance by club ===
Club	Titles	Season
Apollon Krya Vrysi	8	1974, 1975, 1982, 1986, 1989, 2005, 2015, 2024
Aetos Skydra	6	1981, 1987, 1989, 1992, 1993, 2008
Edessaikos	6	1976, 1977, 2003, 2006, 2009, 2017
Almopos Aridea	5	1988, 2000, 2001, 2013, 2016
Niki Axos	4	1979, 1984, 1990, 1999
Ethnikos Giannitsa	4	1983, 1992, 2020, 2022
Aris Palaifyto	3	1973, 1994, 1997
Aris Profitis Ilias	3	1985, 1990, 1995
Olympiacos Galatades	3	1991, 2007, 2014
Anagennisi Giannitsa	2	1978, 2004
Megas Alexandros Neos Mylotopos	2	2010, 2012
PAOK Aravissos	1	1980
Elpida Edessa	1	1982
Aristotelis Loutrochori	1	1991
Filippos Giannitsa	1	1993
Iraklis Edessa	1	1996
Doxa Mandalo	1	1998
Mavroi Aetoi Paralimni	1	2002
PAOK Giannitsa	1	2011
Doxa Mavrovouni	1	2018
Thyella Sarakinoi	1	2019
Mavri Thyella Lykostomo	1	2023
PAOK Dytiko	1	2025
Panedessaikos	1	2026

== Cup ==
=== Cup Winners ===
Season	Winner
1972–73	Doxa Palaios Mylotopos
1973–74	Apollon Krya Vrysi
1974–75	Anagennisi Giannitsa
1975–76	Edessaikos
1976–77	Anagennisi Giannitsa
1977–78	Anagennisi Giannitsa
1978–79	Apollon Krya Vrysi
1979–80	Aetos Skydra
1980–81	Aetos Skydra
1981–82	Edessaikos
1982–83	Apollon Krya Vrysi
1983–84	Apollon Krya Vrysi
1984–85	
1985–86	Aris Profitis Ilias
1986–87	
1987–88	Anagennisi Giannitsa
1988–89	Anagennisi Giannitsa
1989–90	
1990–91	Apollon Krya Vrysi
1991–92	
1992–93	
1993–94	Anagennisi Giannitsa
1994–95	
1995–96	
1996–97	Apollon Krya Vrysi
1997–98	Aris Profitis Ilias
1998–99	Anagennisi Giannitsa
1999–00	Anagennisi Giannitsa
2000–01	Edessaikos
2001–02	Almopos Aridea
2002–03	Apollon Kalyvia
2003–04	Edessaikos
2004–05	Anagennisi Giannitsa
2005–06	Almopos Aridea
2006–07	Aetos Skydra
2007–08	Edessaikos
2008–09	Edessaikos
2009–10	Olympiacos Galatades
2010–11	Edessaikos
2011–12	Megas Alexandros Neos Mylotopos
2012–13	Megas Alexandros Neos Mylotopos
2013–14	Orfeas Rizari
2014–15	Almopos Aridea
2015–16	Apollon Krya Vrysi
2016–17	Edessaikos
2017–18	Doxa Mavrovouni
2018–19	Edessaikos
2019–20	Ethnikos Giannitsa
2020–21	Cancelled
2021–22	Anagennisi Giannitsa
2022–23	Thyella Sarakinoi
2023–24	Apollon Krya Vrysi
2024–25	Apollon Krya Vrysi
2025–26	Ethnikos Giannitsa

=== Performance by club ===
Club	Titles	Season
Anagennisi Giannitsa	10	1975, 1977, 1978, 1988, 1989, 1994, 1999, 2000, 2005, 2022
Apollon Krya Vrysi	9	1974, 1979, 1983, 1984, 1991, 1997, 2016, 2024, 2025
Edessaikos	9	1976, 1982, 2001, 2004, 2008, 2009, 2011, 2017, 2019
Aetos Skydra	3	1980, 1981, 2007
Almopos Aridea	3	2002, 2006, 2015
Aris Profitis Ilias	2	1986, 1998
Megas Alexandros Neos Mylotopos	2	2012, 2013
Ethnikos Giannitsa	2	2020, 2026
Doxa Palaios Mylotopos	1	1973
Apollon Kalyvia	1	2003
Olympiacos Galatades	1	2010
Orfeas Rizari	1	2014
Doxa Mavrovouni	1	2018
Thyella Sarakinoi	1	2023

== Teams in national divisions ==
One team participate in national divisions in the 2026–27 season :

- Gamma Ethniki:
  - Panedessaikos
