= Georgios Manisoglou =

Greek footballer

Personal information
- Full name: Georgios Manisoglou
- Date of birth: 18 February 2002 (age 24)
- Place of birth: Greece
- Position: Right-back

Youth career
- Xanthi

Senior career*
Years	Team	Apps	(Gls)
2020–2021	Xanthi	1	(0)
2021	→ Almopos Aridea (loan)	6	(0)
2021–2022	Trikala	16	(0)

International career^{‡}
2018–2019	Greece U17	9	(0)
- * Club domestic league appearances and goals as of 14 April 2022 ‡ National team caps and goals as of 9 May 2019

Georgios Manisoglou (Greek: Γεώργιος Μανίσογλου; born 18 February 2002) is a Greek professional footballer who plays as a right-back.
