= Christiano Mendy =

Senegalese footballer

Mendy
Personal information
- Full name: Christiano Mendy
- Date of birth: June 4, 1991 (age 35)
- Place of birth: Senegal
- Height: 1.93 m (6 ft 4 in)
- Position: Striker

Team information
- Current team: Diagoras
- Number: 9

Senior career*
Years	Team	Apps	(Gls)
2013–2014	Vyzas Megara	17	(2)
2014–2016	Dakar	0	(0)
2017–2018	Almopos Aridaea	0	(0)
2018	Iraklis	0	(0)
2018	Almopos Aridaea	0	(0)
2019–	Diagoras	17	(2)
- * Club domestic league appearances and goals as of 18 August 2020

Christiano Mendy (born 4 June 1991) is a Senegalese professional footballer who plays as a striker for Greek Football League club Diagoras.
