= Pelopas Kiato F.C. =

Association football club in Greece

Pelopas Kiato
- Full name: Gymnastikos Politistikos Syllogos Kiato "Pelops"
- Founded: 1926; 100 years ago
- Ground: Municipal Kiato Stadium
- Capacity: 8,100 (1,000 seated)
- Chairman: Vasilis Papanikolaou
- Manager: Dimitrios Laloudakis
- League: Gamma Ethniki
- 2025–26: Gamma Ethniki (Group 4), 6th
Home colours	Away colours

Gymnastikos Politistikos Syllogos Pelopas Kiato (Greek: Γυμναστικός Πολιτιστικός Σύλλογος Πέλοπας Κιάτου), known simply as Pelopas Kiato, is a Greek football club, based in Kiato, Corinthia.

== History ==
Founded in 1926, 20 years later, in 1946, it became one of the founding members of the Corinthia Football Clubs Association. It participated in the inaugural championship officially organized by the Corinthia FCA during the 1946–47 season, and has consistently played a leading role ever since.

In the 1966–67 season, it competed in a national championship for the first time, participating in the Gamma Ethniki which was officially implemented for the first time. In 1973, it reached the final of the Greek Amateur Cup, which was held on 30 June at the Nikaia Stadium, where it was defeated by Dafni Erythres. Additionally, in 1973 and 1974, it participated as the Corinthia FCA champion in the FCA champions promotion play-offs, though it failed to secure promotion. In the 1977–78 season, it played in the newly established National Amateur Division, the third tier in the league system. In the 1979–80 season, it was crowned champion of the 2nd Group, defeating Ellas Velo 1–2 away from home on the 38th and final matchday, thereby winning historic and coveted promotion to the Beta Ethniki. It failed to remain in the second national division and competed once again in the National Amateur Division during the 1981–82 season. However, in 1982, following a disagreement, Pelopas' academy seceded, taking the young players with it, leading to the founding of Anagennisi Pelopas (with Alexis Alexandris' father serving as vice-president) featuring red and white as its colors as well, but now operating as an independent club. In the 1982–83 season, it competed in the newly established National Amateur Championship—the precursor to the Delta Ethniki—suffering relegation to the local championship. The following season, it failed to secure a return from the Corinthia FCA First Division. On 14 March 1985, under the presidency of K. Bekiakis and with G. Bismpikis as head coach, it won the Corinthia FCA Cup at Corinth Stadium.

In May 1986, the board of Pelopas and the three other clubs from Kiato (Poseidon, Orfeas, and Anagennisi) ultimately decided to meet to discuss a merger, as Anagennisi, which had raised objections the previous season, was finally convinced to join.

In the 1988–89 season, it returned to the Delta Ethniki, competing there continuously until the 1997–98 season, when it suffered relegation. In 1991, it reached the Greek Amateur Cup final for the second time in its history. In the final, which was held at the Leoforos Alexandras Stadium, it defeated A.O. Thiva and was crowned cup champion. In 1999, as the Corinthia FCA champion, it participated in the FCA champions promotion play-offs, missing out on promotion to the Delta Ethniki.

In the 2003–04 season, it returned to the Delta Ethniki, though it suffered relegation the following year. After a single season in the Corinthia FCA championship, it competed in the Delta Ethniki once more in the 2006–07 season, again suffering relegation. In the 2008–09 season, it returned to the Delta Ethniki and remained there until the 2010–11 season, when it was relegated. In the very next season, 2011–12, it was crowned Corinthia FCA champion and participated in the FCA champions promotion play-offs, finishing in 1st place of the 11th group ahead of Panelefsiniakos to win promotion back to the Delta Ethniki.

In the 2012–13 season, it competed once again in the Delta Ethniki and earned the right to participate in the newly established amateur Gamma Ethniki for the following 2013–14 season. However, due to administrative difficulties, it did not enter the competition and instead returned to the local championship. In the 2016–17 season, it was crowned Corinthia FCA champion and won promotion to Gamma Ethniki, where it competed in the 2017–18 season, ultimately suffering relegation.

From the 2018–19 season to the 2024–25 season, it competed in the Corinthia FCA First Division. In 2025, Pelopas won the championship and participated in the special promotion play-offs, earning a return to the national divisions after 7 years. In August 2025, the club also won the Corinthia FCA Super Cup by defeating A.O. Loutraki 2–1. On 8 August 2026, Pelopas celebrated 100 years since its foundation, finding itself competitive in the Gamma Ethniki.

== Honours ==
=== National ===
  - Gamma Ethniki: 1
    - 1979–80
  - Amateur Cup: 1
    - 1990–91

=== Regional ===
  - Corinthia FCA Championship: 15
    - 1947–48, 1948–49, 1949–50, 1952–53, 1965–66, 1972–73, 1973–74, 1987–88, 1998–99, 2002–03, 2005–06, 2007–08, 2011–12, 2016–17, 2024–25
  - Corinthia FCA Cup: 11
    - 1972–73, 1978–79, 1984–85, 1990–91, 1993–94, 1994–95, 1995–96, 1996–97, 2002–03, 2003–04, 2017–18
  - Corinthia FCA Super Cup: 1
    - 2025
