= Theodoros Papadopoulos =

Greek footballer

Personal information
- Full name: Theodoros Papadopoulos
- Date of birth: August 11, 1987 (age 39)
- Place of birth: Thessaloniki, Greece
- Height: 1.77 m (5 ft 9 1/2 in)
- Position: Defender

Senior career*
Years	Team	Apps	(Gls)
2006–2008	Aris	1	(0)
2008–2009	Apollon Kalamarias	25	(0)
2009–2011	Panthrakikos	6	(0)
2011–2012	Anagennisi Giannitsa	24	(1)
2012–2014	Niki Volos	36	(1)
2014–2014	Iraklis Psachna	10	(0)
2015	Apollon Kalamarias	5	(0)
2015–2016	Niki Volos	0	(0)
2016–2017	Apollon Larissa	0	(0)
2017–2018	Asteras Amaliada	20	(0)
2018–2019	Niki Volos	0	(0)
2019–2021	Diagoras	20	(1)
2021	Niki Volos	0	(0)
- * Club domestic league appearances and goals as of 18 August 2020

Theodoros Papadopoulos (Greek: Θεόδωρος Παπαδόπουλος; born 11 August 1987) is a Greek professional footballer who plays as a defender.

== Career ==
His career began in 2006 when he signed a professional contract with Aris.

Career statistics
season	club	league	Championship		Nation cup		Europe cup		Total	
season	club	league	appear	goals	appear	goals	appear	goals	appear	goals
2006–07	Aris	Super League	1	0	0	0	0	0	1	0
2007–08	Aris	Super League	0	0	0	0	0	0	0	0
2008-09	Apollon Kalamarias	Beta Ethniki	25	2	0	0	0	0	25	2
2009–10	Panthrakikos	Super League	6	0	0	0	0	0	6	0
career total			32	2	0	0	0	0	32	2

Last update: 30 June 2010
