= Sotiris Angelopoulos =

Greek footballer (1937–1997)

Personal information
- Full name: Sotirios Angelopoulos
- Date of birth: 26 September 1937
- Date of death: 14 August 1997 (aged 59)
- Position: Defender

Senior career*
Years	Team	Apps	(Gls)
–1953	Iraklis Xylokastro		
1953–1964	Panathinaikos		

International career
1957–1960	Greece	8	(0)
- * Club domestic league appearances and goals

Sotiris Angelopoulos (26 September 1937 – 14 August 1997) was a Greek footballer. He played in eight matches for the Greece national football team from 1957 to 1960.

== Honours ==
Panathinaikos

- Alpha Ethniki: 1959-1960, 1960–61, 1963–64
- Greek Cup: 1955
