= Asteras Parapotamos F.C. =

Greek football club

Asteras Parapotamos
- Founded: 1980
- Ground: Parapotamos Municipal Stadium; Parapotamos, Thesprotia, Greece
- Capacity: 500
- Manager: Gerasimos Tsoutsouras
- League: Thesprotia FCA First Division
- 2025–26: Thesprotia FCA First Division, 5th

Asteras Parapotamos Football Club is a Greek football club, based in Parapotamos, Thesprotia, Greece.

== Honours ==
=== Domestic Titles and honours ===
  - Thesprotia FCA Champions: 6
    - 1994–95, 1996–97, 2000–01, 2002–03, 2010–11, 2016–17
  - Thesprotia FCA Cup Winners: 2
    - 2003–04, 2006–07
  - Thesprotia FCA Super Cup Winners: 1
    - 2017
