= Pallixouriakos F.C. =

Association football club in Greece

Pallixouriakos
- Full name: Pallixouriakos Athlitikos Omilos
- Founded: 21 November 1950; 75 years ago
- Ground: Argostoli Municipal Stadium
- Capacity: 3,000
- Chairman: Panagiotis Kontarinis
- Manager: Ilias Zervos
- League: Gamma Ethniki
- 2025–26: Kefalonia-Ithaca FCA First Division, 1st (promoted)
- Website: Official website
Home colours	Away colours

Pallixouriakos Football Club (Greek: Παλληξουριακός Α.Ο. Ληξουρίου) is a Greek football club, based in Lixouri, Cephalonia, Greece

== History ==
Pallixouriakos Athlitikos Omilos was founded on 21 November 1950, making it the oldest football club in the town of Lixouri. The team's colors are red and white. In 1964, following years of effort, the club acquired its own stadium in the coastal zone in front of the Old Primary School building, following a donation by the benefactor Evangelos Typaldos Mpasias. Since 2004, the club's squads have been hosted at the Agios Antonios Municipal Stadium. During the 1960s and 1970s, many students from the Vallianos Vocational School played for Pallixouriakos. Their quality left a lasting mark on the team, earning the affection of the people of Lixouri, who passionately supported the club during its matches against its major rival at the time, Olympiakos Argostoli. In the 1970s, the team participated in the Patras FCA Championship. Following the establishment of the Kefalonia-Ithaca Football Clubs Association in 1980, winning the local championship resulted in automatic promotion to the Delta Ethniki. Throughout its various appearances in the Regional Championship, the club recorded notable campaigns and achieved significant victories against strong teams from Western Greece.

=== Modern History ===
Following the club's participation in Delta Ethniki during the 2004–05 season, a long period ensued (until 2014) in which the club faced numerous problems both on and off the pitch, culminating in relegation to the Kefalonia-Ithaca FCA Second Division in the 2006–07 season and a severe administrative crisis following the chaotic Cup Final of the 2008–09 season. Over the past eight years, however, Pallixouriakos has been experiencing a period of continuous progress and development across all competitive levels, demonstrating remarkable consistency in honours on the island at the senior team level.

During the 2017–18 and 2020–21 seasons, the club faced its greatest competitive challenge in recent decades by participating in the Gamma Ethniki championship, while simultaneously representing Kefalonia's football for the first time in a national division beyond the regional level. During these years, the team participated in the Greek Cup following three consecutive local Cup titles (2018, 2019, 2020 – the latter awarded via draw due to the suspension of competitions caused by the pandemic).

In the 2025–26 season, Pallixouriakos celebrated its sixth consecutive championship and 14th overall in the history of the Kefalonia-Ithaca Football Clubs Association. The Red and Whites return to Gamma Ethniki for their third appearance, following their first in 2017–18 and their most recent in 2020–21.

== Stadium ==
Pallixouriakos plays its home matches at the Andreas Vergotis Municipal Stadium in Argostoli, which has a seating capacity of 3,000.

== Rivalries ==
The main rivals of Pallixouriakos are AO Pronnon, Dilinata, Asteras Lixouriou, Ethnikos Kefalonia, Evgeros and formerly Olympiakos Kefalonia.

== Honours ==
=== Domestic ===
  - Kefalonia-Ithaca FCA Champions: 14
    - 1985–86, 1989–90, 1993–94, 1996–97, 1998–99, 2000–01, 2005–06, 2016–17, 2019–20, 2021–22, 2022–23, 2023–24, 2024–25, 2025–26
  - Kefalonia-Ithaca FCA Cup Winners: 8
    - 1990–91, 1997–98, 2000–01, 2017–18, 2018–19, 2019–20, 2021–22, 2023–24
