= Corinthia Football Clubs Association =

Association football governing body in Corinthia Prefecture, Greece

- Full name: Corinthia Football Clubs Association; Greek: Ένωση Ποδοσφαιρικών Σωματείων Κορινθίας
- Short name: Corinthia F.C.A.; Greek: Ε.Π.Σ. Κορινθίας
- Founded: 1946; 80 years ago
- Headquarters: Corinth, Greece
- FIFA affiliation: Hellenic Football Federation
- President: Michael Tsichritzis
- Website: epskor.gr

Corinthia Football Clubs Association (Greek: Ένωση Ποδοσφαιρικών Σωματείων Κορινθίας) is a association football organization in Corinthia that is part of the Hellenic Football Federation.

== Foundation ==
Corinthia FCA was formed in 1946 besides the first council by Michail Fillipidis and Kon. Tsouloufas and its expansion of other products of local soccer. Its founding bodies was seven and ten outside the competition:

- Aris Corinth
- Achilleas Corinth
- Iraklis Lechaio
- Iraklis Xylokastro
- Olympiacos Corinth
- Olympiacos Loutraki
- Pelopas Kiato
- Stratiotiko Kentro Vasikis Ekpedefsis Korinthou (KVEK): took part in the championships without any points.

Its important success in the union in the early 1950s was the local championship organization and its cooperation with Pankorinthiakos in the first championship of the Premier Division in the 1959-60 season.

== Today ==
Corinthia FCA is headquartered in Corinth and includes about 70 clubs. Basic organizations of the association is local soccer championship in three divisions and the Corinthia Cup which features teams from local categories. The body-member of the association which participates in the fourth division and its amateur teams from the association which has a chance to play in the highest categories, the Super League, the second and the third divisions.

The winner of all of Corinthia receives an entry into the national Third Division.

The winner of the Corinthia Cup receives an entry to the Greek Amateur Cup.

The association organizes children's and youth championships, it also supervises the women's clubs and rarely competes in the Corinthia FCA Mixed which features games from other mixed associations.

The association awards each year a reward to the greatest scorer and the Character Cup to teams with the highest points "fair play" of each category

== Divisions (2025–26) ==
The 2025–26 season features the following teams:

=== First division ===
Premier Division
A.O. Zevgolateio
A.S. Agion Theodoron
A.S. Korinthos 2006
Asteras Derveni
Atromitos Chiliomodi
Ellas Velo
Iraklis Xylokastro
Isthmiakos
Olympiacos Assos
Olympiacos Loutraki
Pamvochaikos Aris
Pannemeatikos
PAS Kypselos
Saronikos Galataki
Teneatis Athikia
Thyella Petriou

=== Second division ===
Second Division
AE Solomos'23
Aetos Kryoneri
A.O. Lykoporias
A.O. Perachoras
Asteras Korinthos
Bellerophon Ancient Corinth
Dafni Examilia
Iraklis Lechaio
Nei Stimangas
Panevrostiakos
PAS Ethnikos Xylokeriza
Proodos Agios Vasileios
Thyella Kato Diminio

== League ==
=== Champions ===
Season	Champion
1946–47	Olympiakos Loutraki
1947–48	Pelopas Kiato
1948–49	Pelopas Kiato
1949–50	Pelopas Kiato
1950–51	Achilleas Korinthos
1951–52	Aris Korinthos
1952–53	Pelopas Kiato
1953–54	Aris Korinthos
1954–55	Achilleas Korinthos
1955–56	Olympiakos Loutraki
1956–57	Panargiakos
1957–58	Pannafpliakos
1958–59	Pankorinthiakos
1959–60	Pannafpliakos
1960–61	Pankorinthiakos
1961–62	Pankorinthiakos
1962–63	Olympiakos Loutraki
1963–64	APS Korinthos
1964–65	Olympiakos Loutraki
1965–66	Pelopas Kiato
1966–67	Hellas Velou
1967–68	Olympiakos Loutraki
1968–69	Pannemeatikos
1969–70	Olympiakos Loutraki
1970–71	Pannemeatikos
1971–72	Pannemeatikos
1972–73	Pelopas Kiato
1973–74	Pelopas Kiato
1974–75	Olympiakos Loutraki
1975–76	Olympiakos Loutraki
1976–77	Olympiakos Loutraki
1977–78	Kypselos Korinthos
1978–79	Hellas Velou
1979–80	Teneatis Athikia
1980–81	Pankorinthiakos
1981–82	Kypselos Korinthos
1982–83	Pannemeatikos
1983–84	Hellas Velo
1984–85	Pankorinthiakos
1985–86	Kypselos Korinthos
1986–87	Pankorinthiakos
1987–88	Pelopas Kiato
1988–89	Aetos Aggelokastro
1989–90	Iraklis Lechaio
1990–91	PAO Loutraki
1991–92	Kypselos Korinthos
1992–93	Hellas Velou
1993–94	Hellas Velou
1994–95	Kypselos Korinthos
1995–96	Dafni Examilia
1996–97	Olympiakos Loutraki
1997–98	Pankorinthiakos
1998–99	Pelopas Kiato
1999–00	Loutraki '93
2000–01	PAS Korinthos
2001–02	PAS Korinthos
2002–03	Pelopas Kiato
2003–04	Olympiakos Loutraki
2004–05	Hellas Velou
2005–06	Pelops Kiato
2006–07	Atromitos Chiliomodi
2007–08	Pelopas Kiato
2008–09	Iraklis Xylokastro
2009–10	PAO Loutraki
2010–11	Atromitos Chiliomodi
2011–12	Pelopas Kiato
2012–13	PAO Loutraki; Kypselos Korinthos
2013–14	PAO Loutraki
2014–15	AO Zevgolateio; Iraklis Lechaio 1922
2015–16	AO Zevgolateio
2016–17	Pelopas Kiato
2017–18	PAS Korinthos
2018–19	Korinthos 2006
2019–20	Atromitos Chiliomodi
2020–21	Not completed
2021–22	Teneatis Athikia
2022–23	PAS Korinthos
2023–24	AO Loutraki
2024–25	Pelopas Kiato
2025–26	Iraklis Xylokastro

=== Performance by club ===
Club	Titles	Season
Pelopas Kiato	14	1948, 1949, 1950, 1953, 1966, 1973, 1974, 1988, 1999, 2003, 2006, 2008, 2012, 2017, 2025
Olympiakos Loutraki	11	1947, 1956, 1963, 1965, 1968, 1970, 1975, 1976, 1977, 1997, 2004
Pankorinthiakos	7	1959, 1961, 1962, 1981, 1985, 1987, 1998
Kypselos Korinthos	6	1978, 1982, 1986, 1992, 1995, 2013
Hellas Velo	5	1967, 1979, 1984, 1993, 1994, 2005
AO Loutraki	5	1991, 2010, 2013, 2014, 2024
PAS Korinthos	5	1964, 2001, 2002, 2018, 2023
Pannemeatikos	4	1969, 1971, 1972, 1983
Atromitos Chiliomodi	3	2007, 2011, 2020
Achilleas Korinthos	2	1951, 1955
Aris Korinthos	2	1952, 1954
Pannafpliakos	2	1958, 1960
Iraklis Lechaio	2	1990, 2015
AO Zevgolateio	2	2015, 2016
Iraklis Xylokastro	2	2009, 2026
Teneatis Athikia	2	1980, 2022
Panargiakos	1	1957
Aetos Aggelokastro	1	1989
Dafni Examilia	1	1996
Loutraki '93	1	2000
Korinthos 2006	1	2019

== Cup ==
=== Cup Winners ===
Season	Winner
1971–72	Olympiakos Assos
1972–73	Pelopas Kiato
1973–74	Olympiakos Loutraki
1974–75	PAO Loutraki
1975–76	Olympiakos Loutraki
1976–77	Kypselos Korinthos
1977–78	Kypselos Korinthos
1978–79	Pelopas Kiato
1979–80	Hellas Velo
1980–81	Pankorinthiakos
1981–82	Kypselos Korinthos
1982–83	Asteras Derveni
1983–84	Olympiakos Loutraki
1984–85	Pelopas Kiato
1985–86	Olympiakos Loutraki
1986–87	Kypselos Korinthos
1987–88	Olympiakos Loutraki
1988–89	Dafni Examilia
1989–90	Atromitos Chiliomodi
1990–91	Pelopas Kiato
1991–92	Pankorinthiakos
1992–93	Olympiakos Loutraki
1993–94	Pelopas Kiato
1994–95	Pelopas Kiato
1995–96	Pelopas Kiato
1996–97	Pelopas Kiato
1997–98	Olympiakos Loutraki
1998–99	Loutraki '93
1999–00	PAS Korinthos
2000–01	Kypselos Korinthos
2001–02	PAS Korinthos
2002–03	Pelopas Kiato
2003–04	Pelopas Kiato
2004–05	PAS Korinthos
2005–06	PAS Korinthos
2006–07	Olympiakos Loutraki
2007–08	Iraklis Lechaio
2008–09	Olympiakos Loutraki
2009–10	Iraklis Xylokastro
2010–11	Hellas Velo
2011–12	PAS Korinthos
2012–13	PAO Loutraki
2013–14	Pannemeatikos
2014–15	AO Zevgolateio
2015–16	AO Zevgolateio
2016–17	Iraklis Xylokastro
2017–18	Pelopas Kiato
2018–19	PAS Korinthos
2019–20	Iraklis Xylokastro
2020–21	Abandoned
2021–22	Pankamariakos
2022–23	Agioi Theodoroi
2023–24	PAS Korinthos
2024–25	AO Loutraki
2025–26	AO Loutraki

=== Performance by club ===
Club	Titles	Season
Pelopas Kiato	11	1973, 1979, 1985, 1991, 1994, 1995, 1996, 1997, 2003, 2004, 2018
Olympiakos Loutraki	9	1974, 1976, 1984, 1986, 1988, 1993, 1998, 2007, 2009
PAS Korinthos	7	2000, 2002, 2005, 2006, 2012, 2019, 2024
Kypselos Korinthos	5	1977, 1978, 1982, 1987, 2001
AO Loutraki	4	1975, 2013, 2025, 2026
Iraklis Xylokastro	3	2010, 2017, 2020
Hellas Velo	2	1980, 2011
Pankorinthiakos	2	1981, 1992
AO Zevgolateio	2	2015, 2016
Olympiakos Assos	1	1972
Asteras Derveni	1	1983
Dafni Examilia	1	1989
Atromitos Chiliomodi	1	1990
Loutraki '93	1	1999
Iraklis Lechaio	1	2008
Pannemeatikos	1	2014
Pankamariakos	1	2022
Agioi Theodoroi	1	2023

== Teams in higher divisions ==
In the 2026–27 season, the following clubs from Corinthia took part in higher divisions:

- Third Division:
  - A.O. Loutraki
  - P.A.S. Korinthos
  - Pelopas Kiato
  - Iraklis Xylokastro
