= Megas Alexandros Florina F.C. =

Association football club in Greece

Megas Alexandros Florina
- Full name: Athlitikos Morfotikos Politistikos Syllogos Megas Alexandros Florina
- Founded: 10 September 1923; 103 years ago
- Ground: Florina Municipal Stadium
- Capacity: 5,000
- Chairman: Theofilos Diafonidis
- Manager: Pantelis Tsilemanis
- League: Gamma Ethniki
- 2025–26: Florina FCA First Division, 1st (promoted)
Home colours	Away colours

Megas Alexandros Florina (Greek: Μέγας Αλέξανδρος Φλώρινας) is a Greek football club based in Florina, Western Macedonia. Its official colours are yellow and black.

== History ==
On 10 September 1923, the first football club of Florina, Megas Alexandros, was founded. The club took its name from Alexander the Great. The first general assembly of the club's members took place in a hall at the "Ethnikon" hotel, where the first board of directors was elected, comprising Per. Tanos (President), Panag. Moulieris (Vice President), Ag. Marmaridis (General Secretary), Nik. Nolis (Treasurer), and Charal. Aristeidou (Trustee). The colors of Megas Alexandros were designated as yellow and black, modeled after those of Aris Thessaloniki.

The club's history is divided into three distinct periods. The first period spanned from its founding in 1923 until 1934, when it was dissolved alongside other local teams to establish a new unified club, Hellas. The second period began during the German occupation in 1943 and lasted until 1961, when the club was again dissolved and its players transferred to Nikiforos. The third period commenced in 1976 and continues to the present day. In 1927, the official Western Macedonia regional championship was established, in which Megas Alexandros was considered one of the most prominent and competitive clubs alongside Ermis Amyntaio and Olympiacos Kozani. Megas Alexandros was crowned champion of Western Macedonia in 1930.

Megas Alexandros Florina served as the inspiration for Greek immigrants in Australia, in the 1950s, to establish Alexander Melbourne (now Heidelberg United FC). Due to the economic crisis of the previous decade and the impact of the COVID-19 pandemic, Megas Alexandros faced severe financial hardship; during this period, Heidelberg United provided financial support, demonstrating the enduring connection between the two clubs.

In the 2025–26 season, Megas Alexandros won its second Florina FCA championship title, earning promotion to Gamma Ethniki. In October 2026, Megas Alexandros won its first Florina FCA Super Cup by defeating PAS Florina 3–0.

== Honours ==
=== Regional titles ===
- Florina FCA First Division: 2
  - 1995–96, 2025–26
- Florina FCA Super Cup: 1
  - 2026
- Western Macedonia FCA First Division: 1
  - 1929–30
