= Makedonikos Siatista F.C. =

Greek football club

Makedonikos Siatista
- Full name: Filathlo Somateio Makedonikos Siatista
- Founded: 1954; 72 years ago
- Ground: Siatista Municipal Stadium
- Chairman: Chrysostomos Chantzis
- Manager: Vasilios Mantzolas
- League: Gamma Ethniki
- 2025–26: Kozani FCA First Division, 1st (promoted)
Home colours

Makedonikos Siatista Football Club (Greek: Μακεδονικός Σιάτιστας) is a Greek football club, based in Siatista, Kozani.

== History ==
Makedonikos Siatista was founded in 1954. In 1967, the club won the Northwestern Macedonia FCA Championship. In 1972, it won the Northwestern Macedonia FCA Championship once again. It participated in the special amateur promotion championship for promotion to Beta Ethniki, but did not manage to secure promotion. In 1974, Makedonikos Siatista participated again in the special amateur promotion championship and earned promotion to Beta Ethniki. In 1975, it finished in 18th place and was relegated. In 1977, it won its third regional championship and competed in the special amateur promotion championship, securing a place in the newly established Gamma Ethniki. In 1978, it won the championship and was promoted back to Beta Ethniki. In 1979, playing in Beta Ethniki, it finished in 14th place and maintained its position in the division. In 1980, it finished in last place and was relegated.

In 1981, the club returned to Gamma Ethniki, finishing in 14th place and maintaining its division status. In 1982, it finished in 11th place, a position that secured its participation in the newly established Delta Ethniki. In 1983, it achieved 10th place and remained in the category, followed by a 5th-place finish in 1984. In 1985, it finished in 8th place. In 1986, it finished in last place and was relegated. In 1988, it won the regional championship and participated in the special amateur promotion championship, successfully earning promotion back to Delta Ethniki. In 1989, it finished in 13th place, followed by a 10th-place finish in 1990. The club secured 5th place in both 1991 and 1992, finished 10th in 1993, and in 1994 finished in 11th place and was relegated.

In 2000, the club merged with Aris Siatista to form "A.E. Siatista". In 2009, its original name was restored when A.E. Siatista was renamed back to "F.S. Makedonikos Siatista". In 2011, the club participated once again in Delta Ethniki. In 2018, it won the regional championship and was promoted to Gamma Ethniki. In Group 3 of Gamma Ethniki (2018–19), it finished in 11th place and was relegated to the local regional league.

In 2026, Makedonikos Siatista won the Kozani FCA Championship and earned promotion to Gamma Ethniki after 7 years.

== Honours ==
=== Domestic Titles and honours ===
  - Gamma Ethniki champion: 1
    - 1977–78
  - North-West Macedonia FCA champion: 3
    - 1966–67, 1971–72, 1976–77
  - North-West Macedonia Cup Winners: 3
    - 1972–73, 1973–74, 1980–81
  - Kozani FCA champion: 2
    - 2017–18, 2025–26
  - Kozani FCA Cup Winners: 2
    - 1989–90, 2024–25
