= Neos Amfilochos F.C. =

Neos Amfilochos
- Founded: 2017
- Ground: Amfilochia Municipal Stadium
- Chairman: Markos Fourlanis
- Manager: Theodoros Papachristos
- League: Aetoloacarnania FCA Third Division
- 2025–26: Aetoloacarnania FCA Third Division (Group 2), 3rd

Neos Amfilochos Football Club is a Greek football club, based in Amfilochia, Aetolia-Acarnania, Greece.

The club was established in 2017, after the merger of Panamvrakikos Mpouka F.C. and G.F.S. Amfilochos in order to compete in 2017-18 Gamma Ethniki.

== Honours ==
=== Domestic ===
  - Aetoloacarnania FCA Cup Winners: 1
    - 2017–18
  - Aetoloacarnania FCA Super Cup Winners: 1
    - 2016–17
