= Panedessaikos F.C. =

Association football club in Greece

Panedessaikos
- Full name: Podosfairikos Athlitikos Syllogos Panedessaikos 2024
- Founded: 27 May 2024; 2 years ago
- Ground: Rizari Municipal Stadium
- Chairman: Evangelos Mainos
- Manager: Vacant
- League: Gamma Ethniki
- 2025–26: Pella FCA First Division, 1st (promoted)
- Website: Official website

Panedessaikos F.C. (Greek: Πανεδεσσαϊκός) is a Greek football club based in Edessa, Pella. Its official colours are green and white.

== History ==
Panedessaikos was founded in 2024. The president of Aris Nisi decided to support a new initiative for local football, replacing Aris Nisi. The first manager of the newly formed team was Georgios Karaisaridis, a veteran player of Edessaikos during its "golden era" in the Alpha Ethniki in the 1990s. The club's initial crest featured the waterfall—the landmark symbol of the city of Edessa—with a football in the center, while its main color is green.

In its inaugural 2024–25 season, Panedessaikos finished in 3rd place in the first division of the Pella FCA, failing to achieve promotion.

In the 2025–26 season, Panedessaikos finished in 1st place, winning the Pella FCA championship and gaining promotion to the Gamma Ethniki for the first time.

== Honours ==
=== Regional titles ===
- Pella FCA First Division: 1
  - 2025–26
