= Kefalonia-Ithaca Football Clubs Association =

Association football governing body in Kefalonia Prefecture, Greece

- Full name: Kefalonia–Ithaca Football Clubs Association; Greek: Ένωση Ποδοσφαιρικών Σωματείων Κεφαλληνίας–Ιθάκης
- Short name: Kefalonia–Ithaca F.C.A.; Greek: Ε.Π.Σ. Κεφαλληνίας–Ιθάκης
- Founded: 1980; 46 years ago
- Headquarters: Argostoli, Greece
- FIFA affiliation: Hellenic Football Federation
- President: Themistoklis Valsamis
- Website: epski.gr

Kefalonia–Ithaca Football Clubs Association (Greek: Ένωση Ποδοσφαιρικών Σωματείων Κεφαλληνίας–Ιθάκης) is an association football governing body, representing teams from Cephalonia Prefecture. The association was founded in 1980, after breaking up from the Achaea Football Clubs Association.

== History ==
The Kefalonia-Ithaca Football Clubs Association (EPSKI) was founded in 1980, when the clubs of Cephalonia and Ithaca were separated from the Achaea Football Clubs Association. The founding unions of the association were ten:

- Olympiacos Kefalonia
- Pagkefalliniakos
- A.O. Kefalonia-Ithaca
- P.A.O. Argostoli
- P.A.O. Kefalos
- Odysseus (Ithaka)
- Pallixouriakos
- Pampyrgiakos
- Proodos Ithaka
- Asteras Lixouri

== Organization ==
The association is a member of the Hellenic Football Federation and organizes a regional football league and cup.

== List of champions ==
=== Championships ===
- 1981: Olympiacos Kefalonia
- 1982: Kefalliniakos
- 1983: Olympiacos Kefalonia
- 1984: Kefalliniakos
- 1985: Olympiacos Kefalonia
- 1986: Pallixouriakos
- 1987: Kefalliniakos
- 1988: Kefalliniakos
- 1989: Olympiacos Kefalonia
- 1990: Pallixouriakos
- 1991: Evgeros Faraklata
- 1992: Pankefalliniakos
- 1993: Lixouri
- 1994: Pallixouriakos
- 1995: Kefalliniakos
- 1996: Asteras Lixouri
- 1997: Pallixouriakos
- 1998: Evgeros Faraklata
- 1999: Pallixouriakos
- 2000: A.O.K.I.
- 2001: Pallixouriakos
- 2002: A.O.K.I.
- 2003: Livatho
- 2004: Pallixouriakos
- 2005: Anogi
- 2006: Olympiacos Kefalonia
- 2007: Livatho
- 2008: Papyrgiakos
- 2009: Livatho
- 2010: Olympiacos Kefalonia
- 2011: A.O. Eikosimia
- 2012: A.O. Dilinata
- 2013: A.E. Kefalonia
- 2014: A.E. Kefalonia
- 2015: A.E. Kefalonia
- 2016: A.O. Eikosimia
- 2017: Pallixouriakos
- 2018: A.O. Eikosimia
- 2019: A.O. Pronnoi
- 2020: Pallixouriakos
- 2021: cancelled
- 2022: Pallixouriakos
- 2023: Pallixouriakos
- 2024: Pallixouriakos
- 2025: Pallixouriakos
- 2026: Pallixouriakos

=== Performance by club ===
| Club | Titles | Season |
|---|---|---|
| Pallixouriakos | 14 | 1986, 1990, 1994, 1997, 1999, 2001, 2004, 2017, 2020, 2022, 2023, 2024, 2025, 2026 |
| Olympiacos Kefalonia | 6 | 1981, 1983, 1985, 1989, 2006, 2010 |
| Kefalliniakos | 5 | 1982, 1984, 1987, 1988, 1995 |
| Livatho | 3 | 2003, 2007, 2009 |
| A.E. Kefalonia | 3 | 2013, 2014, 2015 |
| A.O. Eikosimia | 3 | 2011, 2016, 2018 |
| Evgeros Faraklata | 2 | 1991, 1998 |
| A.O.K.I. | 2 | 2000, 2002 |
| Pankefalliniakos | 1 | 1992 |
| Lixouri | 1 | 1993 |
| Asteras Lixouri | 1 | 1996 |
| Anogi | 1 | 2005 |
| Papyrgiakos | 1 | 2008 |
| A.O. Dilinata | 1 | 2012 |
| A.O. Pronnoi | 1 | 2019 |

=== Cup ===
- 1981: Proodos Ithaca
- 1982: Olympiacos Kefalonia
- 1983: Olympiacos Kefalonia
- 1984: Olympiacos Kefalonia
- 1985: Kefalliniakos
- 1986: Olympiacos Kefalonia
- 1987: Olympiacos Kefalonia
- 1988: Olympiacos Kefalonia
- 1989: Olympiacos Kefalonia
- 1990: Olympiacos Kefalonia
- 1991: Pallixouriakos
- 1992: A.O.K.I.
- 1993: Kefalliniakos
- 1994: Kefalliniakos
- 1995: Evgeros Faraklata
- 1996: Evgeros Faraklata
- 1997: Asteras Lixouri
- 1998: Pallixouriakos
- 1999: A.O.K.I.
- 2000: A.O.K.I.
- 2001: Pallixouriakos
- 2002: Pagkefalliniakos
- 2003: A.O.K.I.
- 2004: Livatho
- 2005: A.O.K.I.
- 2006: Livatho
- 2007: Livatho
- 2008: Livatho
- 2009: Livatho
- 2010: Olympiacos Kefalonia
- 2011: Olympiacos Kefalonia
- 2012: A.O. Eikosimia
- 2013: Pankefaloniakos
- 2014: A.O. Kefalonia-Ithaca
- 2015: A.O. Dilinata
- 2016: A.E. Kefalonia
- 2017: A.O. Sami
- 2018: Pallixouriakos
- 2019: Pallixouriakos
- 2020: Pallixouriakos
- 2021: cancelled
- 2022: Pallixouriakos
- 2023: A.O. Dilinata
- 2024: Pallixouriakos
- 2025: A.P.S. Pylariakos
- 2026: Pallixouriakos

=== Performance by club ===
| Club | Titles | Season |
|---|---|---|
| Olympiacos Kefalonia | 10 | 1982, 1983, 1984, 1986, 1987, 1988, 1989, 1990, 2010, 2011 |
| Pallixouriakos | 9 | 1991, 1998, 2001, 2018, 2019, 2020, 2022, 2024, 2026 |
| A.O.K.I. | 5 | 1992, 1999, 2000, 2003, 2005 |
| Livatho | 5 | 2004, 2006, 2007, 2008, 2009 |
| Kefalliniakos | 3 | 1985, 1993, 1994 |
| Evgeros Faraklata | 2 | 1995, 1996 |
| A.O. Dilinata | 2 | 2015, 2023 |
| Proodos Ithaca | 1 | 1981 |
| Asteras Lixouri | 1 | 1997 |
| Pagkefalliniakos | 1 | 2002 |
| A.O. Eikosimia | 1 | 2012 |
| Pankefaloniakos | 1 | 2013 |
| A.O. Kefalonia-Ithaca | 1 | 2014 |
| A.E. Kefalonia | 1 | 2016 |
| A.O. Sami | 1 | 2017 |
| A.P.S. Pylariakos | 1 | 2025 |
