= Iraklis Xylokastro F.C. =

Association football club in Greece

Iraklis Xylokastro
- Full name: Podosfairikos Athlitikos Omilos Iraklis Xylokastro
- Founded: 1928; 98 years ago
- Ground: Xylokastro Municipal Stadium
- Capacity: 350
- Chairman: Petros Tselios
- Manager: Nikos Loumpardeas
- League: Gamma Ethniki
- 2025–26: Corinthia FCA First Division, 1st (promoted)
- Website: Official website
Home colours	Away colours	Third colours

Iraklis Xylokastro (Greek: Ηρακλής Ξυλόκαστρου) is a Greek football club based in Xylokastro, Corinthia. Its official colours are green and white.

== History ==
Founded in 1928, Iraklis has operated continuously to the present day with an uninterrupted presence at both local and national levels, maintaining its activities even during the Axis occupation. Since its registration with the Hellenic Football Federation, it has retained the registration number 235; it is estimated to be among the 100 oldest active football clubs in Greece, as the majority of clubs preceding it in numerical registration order have either disbanded or merged. It quickly gained popularity due to the sport being unprecedented at the time, combined with the team's successful performances. Such a successful beginning for Iraklis Xylokastro was attributed to Michalis Vasileiou, who organized and popularized the team and football in the region. Michalis Vasileiou was originally from Xylokastro and played for Panathinaikos from 1926 to 1935 as a left-back. In 1930, he won the Panhellenic Championship, which was the first championship title in Panathinaikos's history.

Alongside his status as a Panathinaikos footballer, whenever Michalis Vasileiou was in his hometown, he undertook the organization of the team and the training of Iraklis Xylokastro's players, serving as head coach for several years. Having built an effective and disciplined squad, he quickly made the team popular and beloved among the people of Xylokastro, creating passionate supporters who contributed from their modest means so that Iraklis Xylokastro could travel for its matches and maintain comprehensive kit equipment. From the outset, he established green and white as the official colors and led the official recognition of the club upon its founding in 1928. In 1946, Iraklis Xylokastro was one of the founding clubs of the Corinthia Football Clubs Association (EPSK)—alongside Pelops Kiato, Iraklis Lechaio, Olympiacos Loutraki, Aris Corinth, Achilleas Corinth, Olympiacos Corinth, and the military training center KVEK. The club has competed continuously in its championships to this day, initially utilizing the pitch located at the schools above the Pefkias forest.

=== 1970s ===
During the 1970s, Iraklis established itself in Korinthian football as a traditional team respected and reckoned with by all opponents. The team played a leading role with key players such as Georgios Mentzelos, Michalis Fragkos, Georgios Giannos, Evangelos Papageorgiou, Soulis and Vasilis Koutsoumpis, Vlasis Papangelopoulos, and Dimitris Mpakamis.

=== 1980s & 1990s ===
During the 1980s and 1990s, Iraklis Xylokastro established itself as a staple force in the A Division of the Korinthia regional championship, with Xylokastro coming to be recognized as an area with a rich football tradition and exceptional players. Iraklis relocated once again to its current home in the Sythas area, initially a dirt pitch that was named "Sotiris Angelopoulos" in honor of the great footballer produced by the club.

=== 2000s ===
In the 2008–09 season, after years of effort, Iraklis Xylokastro was crowned Corinthia FCA First Division champion for the first time in its history and earned promotion to Delta Ethniki, marking one of the most glorious moments in the club's history.

=== Recent Years ===
During the 2016–17 season—shortly before celebrating its 90th anniversary—Iraklis Xylokastro recorded one of the most successful campaigns in its history. Built around home-grown players from Xylokastro alongside club captain Michalis Kafantaris, and under head coach Nikos Kolimadis, the team captured the Corinthia FCA Cup on 15 March 2017 in Zevgolateio Stadium by defeating Korinthos '06 on penalties following a 1–1 draw in regular time. Sixteen-year-old Kostas Matthaiopoulos scored the equalizer, becoming the youngest player to score in a Corinthian Cup final. In the penalty shootout, M. Kafantaris, Piliafas, Mastrogiannopoulos, and Alousi successfully converted their kicks, while goalkeeper Ilias Kouroumalis saved a crucial penalty to seal the victory. To reach the final, Iraklis defeated Mapso (5–0), Klenia (5–1), Dafni Examilia (1–0), and Teneatis Athikia (1–0 in extra time). In league competition, the newly promoted side finished in 6th place. That same season, the club's youth academy—under coaches Manolis Soulos and Michalis Kafantaris—won the regional Under-15 Championship for the first time in its history, while the Under-17 team finished in 3rd place.

The 2019–20 season proved fortunate for the club, despite being historically marked by the nationwide suspension of all sports competitions in March 2020 due to the COVID-19 pandemic, with league standings frozen at the time of interruption. In the Corinthia FCA Cup, which had reached the semifinal stage prior to the shutdown, the four remaining teams—Iraklis Xylokastro, AO Loutraki, Ellas Velo, and AS Korinthos 2006—were entered into a random draw conducted by the association to determine the champion. The draw selected Iraklis Xylokastro as the 2019–20 Cup winner, securing the third regional cup title in the club's history.

As regional cup winners, Iraklis participated in the 2020–21 Greek Football Cup starting from the first preliminary round—a milestone achieved for the first time in 70 years.

During this appearance, Iraklis recorded one of the most prominent national-level victories in its history. Facing Koronida Koilada from Argolis (then competing in Gamma Ethniki), Iraklis secured qualification to the second round on 28 October 2020 following a 4–2 win on penalties after a 0–0 draw through regular and extra time. Played behind closed doors due to COVID-19 pandemic restrictions, A. Piliafas, Diamantopoulos, Skouras, and Mastrogiannopoulos converted their penalty kicks, while goalkeeper Ilias Kouroumalis stopped a shot to secure qualification. The competition was subsequently suspended for amateur clubs by government decree, proceeding only with professional teams from the sixth round onward; prior to the shutdown, Iraklis had been drawn to play Gamma Ethniki side Ifaistos Vrontama in the second round in Vlachioti, Laconia.

During the 2025–26 season, Iraklis won the Corinthia FCA championship for the second time in its history, following its initial title in 2009. With this title, the club earned historic promotion to Gamma Ethniki ahead of the 2026–27 campaign. This marks Iraklis's debut in the third tier and its second overall appearance in national divisions, following its participation in Delta Ethniki during the 2009–10 season.

== Stadium ==
The home venue of Iraklis Xylokastro is the "Sotiris Angelopoulos" Municipal Stadium of Xylokastro, located in the Sythas area, with a seating capacity of 350 spectators. The stadium was named "Sotiris Angelopoulos" in honor of the first Iraklis Xylokastro player to feature for the Greece national football team and achieve a transfer to a major Athens club, Panathinaikos, which the stadium occasionally hosts for veterans' exhibition matches.

== Honours ==
=== Regional titles ===
- Corinthia FCA First Division: 2
  - 2008–09, 2025–26
- Corinthia FCA Cup: 3
  - 2009–10, 2016–17, 2019–20
- Corinthia FCA Super Cup: 1
  - 2026
