= Apollon 1960 Krya Vrysi F.C. =

Association football club in Greece

Apollon 1960 Krya Vrysi
- Full name: Politistikos Athlitikos Syllogos Apollon Krya Vrysi 1960
- Nickname: Ο πρίγκιπας του κάμπου (The prince of the plain)
- Founded: 1960
- Ground: Krya Vrysi Municipal Stadium "Ioannis Tserkezidis"
- Capacity: 5,000 (2,000 seated)
- League: Pella FCA
- 2025–26: Gamma Ethniki (Group 1), 8th (relegated)
Home colours	Away colours

Apollon 1960 Krya Vrysi F.C. is a Greek football club, based in Krya Vrysi, Pella.

The club was founded in 1960.

== History ==
=== A.G.S. Apollon Krya Vrysi (1960–2011) ===
In 1960, Iraklis Krya Vrysi merged with Doxa Krya Vrysi to form Athlitikos Gymnastikos Syllogos Krya Vrysi "O Apollon" (Greek: Αθλητικός Γυμναστικός Σύλλογος Κρύας Βρύσης ο Απόλλων).

In the past, the club competed in the Delta Ethniki, the Gamma Ethniki (1993–1996, 1998–2002), and most successfully in the Beta Ethniki for 3 consecutive seasons (1970–1973). In the following years, the club suffered successive relegations, eventually falling to the local Pella Football Clubs Association championships.

During the 2009–10 season, the club competed in the Pella FCA First Division, having been relegated from the Delta Ethniki the previous season. In the 2010–11 season, the club was relegated to the Pella FCA Third Division for the first time in its history.

=== A.S. Apollon Kryas Vrysis 1960 (2011–2018) ===
In the summer of 2011, the club merged with the Digenis Akritas Krya Vrysi Academy, competing in the Pella FCA First Division. In the spring of 2015, the entity formed from the merger was renamed Athlitikos Syllogos Apollon Krya Vrysi 1960 (Greek: Αθλητικός Σύλλογος Απόλλων Κρύας Βρύσης 1960).

In the 2014–15 season, the club won the Pella FCA championship and subsequently finished first in Group 3 of the 2015 FCA Winners' Championship. As a result, they returned to the Gamma Ethniki for the 2015–16 season after a 13-year absence, remaining in the division for one year. From 2016 onward, the club competed in the top tier of the Pella FCA before becoming inactive in 2018.

=== P.A.S. Apollon 1960 (2020–present) ===
In 2020, the club reactivated under the name Politistikos Athlitikos Syllogos Apollon 1960 (Greek: Πολιτιστικός Αθλητικός Σύλλογος Απόλλων 1960), restarting from the Pella FCA Second Division, where it played for 2 seasons. In the 2021–22 season, it won the league title and earned promotion to the Pella FCA First Division, where it secured back-to-back promotions. In the 2023–24 season, the club won the Pella FCA A' Division championship, earning a spot in the 2024 FCA Winners' Championship, where it achieved promotion to the Gamma Ethniki after an 8-year absence.

== Honours ==
=== Domestic Titles and honors ===
  - Third Division: 1
    - 1969–70
  - Fourth Division: 2
    - 1992–93, 1997–98
  - Pella FCA Champions: 8
    - 1973–74, 1974–75, 1981–82, 1985–86, 1988–89, 2004–05, 2014–15, 2023–24
  - Pella FCA Cup Winners: 4
    - 1983–84, 1990–91, 1996–97, 2014–15
