= Vatolakkos, Grevena =

Vatolakkos Βατόλακκος
- Community
- Location within Greece
- Coordinates: 40°9.1′N 21°28.9′E
- Country: Greece
- Administrative region: Western Macedonia
- Regional unit: Grevena
- Municipality: Grevena
- Municipal unit: Grevena

Area
  - Community: 8.951 km^{2} (3.456 sq mi)
- Elevation: 580 m (1,900 ft)

Population (2021)
  - Community: 262
  - Density: 29.3/km^{2} (75.8/sq mi)
- Time zone: UTC+2 (EET)
  - Summer (DST): UTC+3 (EEST)
- Postal code: 511 00
- Area code: +30-2462
- Vehicle registration: PN

Vatolakkos (Greek: Βατόλακκος, before 1919: Νταβράτοβο – Ntavratovo, between 1919 and 1927: Ντοβράτοβο – Ntovratovo) is a village and a community of the Grevena municipality. Before the 2011 local government reform it was a part of the municipality of Grevena, of which it was a municipal district. The 2021 census recorded 262 residents in the village. The community of Vatolakkos covers an area of 8.951 km^{2}.

Ntavratovo was populated by Greek speaking Muslim Vallahades. The 1920 Greek census recorded 381 people in the village, and 381 inhabitants (71 families) were Muslim in 1923. Following the Greek–Turkish population exchange, Greek refugee families in Ntavratovo were from Asia Minor (27) and Pontus (63) in 1926. The 1928 Greek census recorded 353 village inhabitants. In 1928, the refugee families numbered 90 (331 people).

== See also ==
- List of settlements in the Grevena regional unit
