= Diagoras Agia Paraskevi F.C. =

Greek football club

Diagoras Agia Paraskevi
- Full name: Athlitikos Omilos Diagoras Agia Paraskevi
- Founded: 1969; 57 years ago
- Ground: Agia Paraskevi Municipal Stadium Agia Paraskevi, Lesbos, Greece
- Chairman: Athanasios Giannakelis
- Manager: Giorgos Manousos
- League: Gamma Ethniki
- 2025–26: Lesbos FCA First Division, 1st (promoted)
| Home colours | Away colours |

Diagoras Agia Paraskevi F.C. is a Greek football club, based in Agia Paraskevi, Lesbos, Greece.

== History ==
Athlitikos Omilos Agias Paraskevis Lesvou "Diagoras" was founded in 1969. The football team's first success came during the 1984–85 season, when it won the Lesbos FCA championship. The following season, 1985–86, the team participated in the Delta Ethniki championship for the first time in its history, finishing 18th in the Group 1 standings with 9 points, resulting in relegation to the local leagues.

During the 2006–07 season, the team won the Lesbos FCA championship for the second time. In the very next season, it won its first Lesbos FCA Cup, while during the same 2007–08 season, it competed once again in the Delta Ethniki, finishing 12th in Group 8 with 25 points, which resulted in relegation back to the local leagues. In the 2008–09 season, the club claimed the Lesbos FCA championship title for the third time. The following season, 2009–10, it participated in the Delta Ethniki for the third time, finishing 14th in Group 9 with 27 points, whereupon it was relegated to the local divisions of Lesbos FCA.

During the 2016–17 season, the club won the Lesbos FCA Cup for the second time, while also claiming the Lesbos FCA championship title for the fourth time, thereby earning promotion to the Gamma Ethniki. In its first season in the amateur Gamma Ethniki championship, 2017–18, the team was placed in Group 7.

During the 2025–26 season, the club once again won the Lesbos FCA championship, securing its return to the Gamma Ethniki after an 8-year absence. The season concluded in the best possible way with the capture of the Lesbos FCA Cup, defeating Iraklis Atsiki 3–2 in the final.

== Honours ==
=== Domestic Titles and honours ===
  - Lesbos FCA Champion: 6
    - 1984–85, 2006–07, 2008–09, 2014–15, 2016–17, 2025–26
  - Lesbos FCA Cup Winners: 3
    - 2007–08, 2016–17, 2025–26
