= Tamynaikos F.C. =

Tamynaikos
- Founded: 1958; 68 years ago
- Ground: Aliveri Municipal Stadium
- Chairman: Anastasios Katsinopoulos
- Manager: Athanasios Methenitis
- League: Gamma Ethniki
- 2025–26: Euboea FCA First Division, 1st (promoted)
Home colours	Away colours

Tamynaikos Football Club is a Greek football club, based in Aliveri, Euboea, Greece

== Honours ==
=== Domestic ===
  - Euboea FCA Champion: 4
    - 1979–80, 1991–92, 2016–17, 2025–26
  - Euboea FCA Cup Winners: 3
    - 1977–78, 1994–95, 2007–08
