= MPAM FC =

Association football club in Greece

MPA.M F.C.
- Full name: Mpala Magiki A.C.
- Founded: 2022; 4 years ago
- Ground: Evosmos Municipal Stadium
- Capacity: 4,000
- Owner(s): Haris Mylionis; Haris Tassos
- Manager: Manolis Konstantaras
- League: Gamma Ethniki
- 2025–26: Macedonia FCA First Division, 2nd (promoted)
- Website: mpamfc.gr
Home colours	Away colours

MPAM FC (Greek: ΜΠΑΜ FC) is a Greek football club based in Thessaloniki, Central Macedonia, Greece. Founded in 2022, the club is affiliated with the Macedonia Football Clubs Association and competes in Gamma Ethniki.

== History ==
MPAM FC was founded in 2022 by Greek YouTubers Haris Mylionis and Haris Tassos. The club entered the local football pyramid through the competitions organised by the Macedonia Football Clubs Association.

In the 2022–23 season, MPAM FC won the C EPS Makedonia title and gained promotion to B EPS Makedonia. The following season, the club secured a second consecutive league title and promotion to A EPS Makedonia.

In 2024–25, MPAM FC achieved a third consecutive promotion, defeating Doxa Retzikiou 3–1 in a promotion play-off for a place in A1 EPS Makedonias.

In the 2025–26 season, MPAM FC achieved a fourth consecutive promotion to the Gamma Ethniki after defeating AO Pavlos Melas 0–1.

MPAM FC holds a remarkable recent record in Greece with four consecutive promotions in four years since the club's foundation:

- 2022–23: Won the C EPS Makedonia title and promoted to B EPS Makedonia.

- 2023–24: Secured a second consecutive league title and promotion to A EPS Makedonia.

- 2024–25: Achieved a third consecutive promotion via play-offs to reach A1 EPS Makedonias.

- 2025–26: Claimed a fourth consecutive promotion to the Gamma Ethniki (the third tier of Greek football)

== Honours ==
Macedonia FCA Third Division

- Winners: 2022–23

Macedonia FCA Second Division

- Winners: 2023–24
