= Megas Alexandros Karperi F.C. =

Megas Alexandros Karperi
- Full name: Mousikos Gymnastikos Syllogos Megas Alexandros Karperi
- Founded: 1949; 77 years ago
- Ground: Karperi Municipal Stadium Karperi, Serres, Greece
- League: Serres FCA
- 2025–26: Inactive

Megas Alexandros Karperi F.C. (Greek: Μέγας Αλέξανδρος Καρπερής) is a Greek football club, based in Karperi, Serres.

== History ==
Mousikos Gymnastikos Syllogos Megas Alexandros Karperi was founded in 1949. In the 1990–91 season, the club competed in Group 2 of the Delta Ethniki, finishing 21st with 16 points and suffering relegation to the local divisions. In the 2016–17 season, the club won the Serres FCA First Division Championship, earning promotion to the Gamma Ethniki. In its maiden appearance in the division, during the 2017–18 season, the team finished 12th and bottom of Group 1, resulting in relegation back to the local divisions.

== Honors ==
Old crest

=== Domestic Titles and honors ===
  - Serres FCA Champion: 1
    - 2016-17
