= Aris Palaiochori F.C. =

Aris Palaiochori
- Founded: 1952; 74 years ago
- Ground: Palaiochori Municipal Stadium
- League: Chalkidiki FCA Third Division
Home colours	Away colours

Aris Palaiochori Football Club (Greek: Α.Σ. Άρης Παλαιοχωρίου) is a Greek football club based in Palaiochori, Chalkidiki, Greece.

== Honours ==
Old crest

=== Domestic ===
  - Chalkidiki FCA Champions: 3
    - 1991–92, 1996–97, 2016–17
  - Chalkidiki FCA Cup Winners: 2
    - 1992–93, 1996–97
