= Parapotamos =

Parapotamos Παραπόταμος
- Municipal unit
- Location within the regional unit

- Location within Greece
- Coordinates: 39°33′N 20°20′E
- Country: Greece
- Administrative region: Epirus
- Regional unit: Thesprotia
- Municipality: Igoumenitsa

Area
  - Municipal unit: 60.3 km^{2} (23.3 sq mi)

Population (2021)
  - Municipal unit: 969
  - Municipal unit density: 16.1/km^{2} (41.6/sq mi)
  - Community: 634
- Time zone: UTC+2 (EET)
  - Summer (DST): UTC+3 (EEST)
- Vehicle registration: ΗΝ

Parapotamos (Greek: Παραπόταμος, before 1928: Βάρφανη - Varfani) is a village and a former municipality in Thesprotia, Epirus, Greece. Since the 2011 local government reform it is part of the municipality Igoumenitsa, of which it is a municipal unit. The municipal unit has an area of 60.334 km^{2}. Population 969 (2021). The village of Parapotamos, the former municipality's seat, was home to Cham Albanians, before 1944, when they were expelled for collaborating with Nazi forces.

== Name ==
The name of Parapotamos means "riverside" or "by the river" in the Greek language. The village is known as Varfanj in Albanian, which comes from varfër/varfanjak meaning "poor", thus Varfani, "poor area" or "poor region" in Albanian.
