= A.O. Loutraki F.C. =

Greek football club

AO Loutraki
- Full name: Athlitikos Omilos Loutraki
- Nickname: Οράνιε (Oranje)
- Short name: AOL
- Founded: 30 August 1970; 56 years ago
- Ground: Municipal Loutraki Stadium
- Capacity: 5,500
- Chairman: Thomas Kanavos
- Manager: Jasminko Velić
- League: Gamma Ethniki
- 2025–26: Gamma Ethniki (Group 4), 9th
- Website: aoloutraki.gr
Home colours	Away colours

Old logo of the team

Athlitikos Omilos Loutraki (Greek: Αθλητικός Όμιλος Λουτράκι), commonly referred to as AO Loutraki or simply AOL, is a Greek football club, based in Loutraki, Corinthia.

The club was founded in 1970. They will play in Gamma Ethniki for the season 2026–27.

== Players ==
=== Current squad ===
Note: Flags indicate national team as defined under FIFA eligibility rules; some limited exceptions apply. Players may hold more than one non-FIFA nationality.

No.	Pos.	Nation	Player
—	GK	GRE	Anastasios Lintas
—	GK	GRE	Kalliakmanis Ioannis
—	GK	GRE	Kontis Spyridon
—	GK	GRE	Mitrou Andreas
—	GK	GRE	Nikolopoulos Dimitrios
—	DF	GRE	Gkarmiris Konstantinos
—	DF	GRE	Bekos Panagiotis
—	DF	GRE	Notis Ilias
—	DF	GRE	Painesis Alexios
—	DF	GRE	Papanastasiou Georgios
—	DF	GRE	Pappas Georgios
—	DF	GRE	Tsokos Theofanis
—	DF	GRE	Chatzinikolis Nikolaos
—	MF	GRE	Zervos Alexios

No.	Pos.	Nation	Player
—	MF	GRE	Spyros Fourlanos
—	MF	GRE	Mavrelis Dimitrios
—	MF	GRE	Belevetis Evangelos
—	MF	GRE	Petrou Socratis
—	MF	GRE	Papoutsis Vasileios
—	MF	GRE	Petridis Dimitrios
—	MF	GRE	Siokos Ilias
—	MF	GRE	Flevaris Christos
—	FW	GRE	Apostolakis Konstantinos
—	FW	GRE	Dimakis Efstathios
—	FW	GRE	Prattos Aris
—	FW	GRE	Sousounis Eleftherios
—	FW	GRE	Dimitrios Gkizariotis
—	FW	GRE	Georgoulias Philippos

== Staff ==
Name	Position
(Greece) Ioannis Noulas	Strength and conditioning coach
(Greece) Aineias Samonis	Physiotherapist

== Honours ==
=== Domestic Titles and honors ===
- Corinthia FCA First Division Champions: 5
  - 1990–91, 2009–10, 2012–13, 2013–14, 2023–24
- Corinthia FCA Cup Winners: 4
  - 1974–75, 2012–13, 2024–25, 2025–26
