= 2016–17 Ergotelis F.C. season =

Ergotelis
2016–17 season
- Chairman: Georgios Vrentzos
- Manager: Giannis Chatzinikolaou (16 June − 25 October 2016); Nikos Oustampasidis (26 October 2016 − 16 January 2017); Soulis Papadopoulos (18 January 2017 − present)
- Stadium: Pankritio Stadium, Heraklion
- Gamma Ethniki: 1st − Champions (promoted)
- Gamma Ethniki Cup: First Round
- Top goalscorer: League: Nikolaos Katsikokeris (18 goals); All: Nikolaos Katsikokeris (18 goals)
Home colours	Away colours

The 2016–17 season was Ergotelis' 87th season in existence and 1st season in the Gamma Ethniki, the third tier of the Greek football league system, after 14 years in which the club competed in professional competitions. Ergotelis also participated in the Gamma Ethniki Cup, a football competition cup in which only the clubs competing in one of the four groups of the Gamma Ethniki can participate. The season marked the beginning of a new era in the club's history, as the previous Football Club opened winding-up proceedings entering into liquidation, a process that allowed the parent sport club G.S. Ergotelis to form a new football department eligible to compete in the Gamma Ethniki under new leadership, free of the financial obligations of the previous administration. The club slogan for the season Ksekiname! (Greek: Ξεκινάμε!) literally translates to We begin!. The project was successful, as Ergotelis finished as Champions of Group 4, achieving instant promotion to the Football League, and professional divisions in general.

== Players ==
Summer acquisition
Winter acquisition

No.	Name	Nationality	Position (s)	Date of birth (age)	Signed from	Notes
Goalkeepers
	Georgios Vasiliadis	(Greece)	GK	10 June 1996 (20)	(Greece) Veria	
	Georgios Chaniotakis	(Greece)	GK	23 January 1995 (22)	Youth system	
	Alexandros Leco	(Albania) (Greece)	GK	22 April 1992 (25)	(Greece) Ionikos	
Defenders
	Minas Tzanis	(Greece)	CB	4 July 1984 (32)	(Greece) Ermis Zoniana	
	Thomas Garaklidis	(Greece)	CB	23 May 1989 (27)	(Greece) Doxa Drama	
	Christos Batzios	(Greece)	CB	15 October 1991 (25)	(Greece) Kavala	
	Georgios Papapanagiotou	(Greece)	CB	31 October 1986 (30)	(Greece) Trikala	
	Manolis Nikolakakis	(Greece)	RB	19 February 1991 (26)	(Greece) Trikala	
	Stamatis Karras	(Greece)	RB	10 December 1988 (28)	(Greece) Panserraikos	
Midfielders
	Anastasios Rousakis	(Greece)	DM	21 July 1985 (31)	(Greece) Apollon Smyrnis	
	Micheel	(Brazil) (Spain)	DM	26 November 1990 (26)	(Brazil) Boa EC	
	Giannis Gotsoulias	(Greece)	DM	15 March 1990 (27)	(Greece) Panachaiki	
	Vasilios Vogiatzis	(Greece)	DM	10 January 1996 (21)	Youth system	
	Serginho	(Portugal)	AM	16 June 1985 (31)	(Greece) Trikala	
	Christos Niaros	(Greece)	LM	20 February 1990 (27)	(Greece) Trikala	
	Christos Mingas	(Greece)	RM	15 April 1984 (33)	(Greece) Trikala	
Forwards
	Sergio Leal	(Uruguay)	RW	25 September 1982 (34)	(Uruguay) Plaza Colonia	
	Periklis Vellinis	(Greece)	RW / CF	1 September 1993 (23)	(Greece) Sparti	
	Nikos Katsikokeris	(Greece)	CF	19 June 1988 (28)	(Greece) Ermis Zoniana	
	Fotis Kaimakamoudis	(Greece)	CF	2 January 1993 (24)	(Greece) Fostiras	
	Alexandros Bracjani	(Albania) (Greece)	CF	6 July 1992 (24)	(Greece) Kavala	
	Georgios Manousakis	(Greece)	CF	10 April 1998 (19)	Youth system	

=== The following players have departed in mid-season ===
Anastasios Tsoumagas	(Greece)	LB	22 March 1991 (26)	(Portugal) Neves FC	Contract terminated.
Georgios Lydakis	(Greece)	CF	9 January 1997 (20)	Youth system	→ Neoi Ergoteli
Alkis Dimitris	(Greece) (Albania)	CB	23 July 1980 (35)	(Greece) Platanias	Contract terminated.
Angelos Zouboulakis	(Greece)	RB	23 May 1989 (27)	(Greece) Kerkyra	Contract terminated.
Elton Calé	(Brazil)	AM / CF	12 July 1988 (28)	(Greece) OFI Crete	Contract terminated.
Giannis Kolokas	(Greece)	CB	28 June 1985 (31)	(Greece) Panegialios	Contract terminated.
Manolis Stefanakos	(Greece)	GK	17 August 1989 (27)	(Greece) Panetolikos	Contract terminated.
Mauro Poy	(Argentina) (Italy)	RW	2 July 1981 (35)	(Greece) Aris	Contract terminated.
Nikolaos Sifakis	(Greece)	CB	23 May 1996 (21)	Youth system	Released.
David Beruashvili	(Greece) (Georgia (country))		10 June 1996 (20)	Youth system	Released.
Dimitrios Kiliaras	(Greece)	AM	23 March 1986 (31)	(Greece) Sparti	Released.
Georgios Polychronakis	(Greece)		4 July 1997 (19)	Youth system	Released.

Note: Flags indicate national team as has been defined under FIFA eligibility rules. Players and Managers may hold more than one non-FIFA nationality.

Head coach	Captain	Kit manufacturer	Shirt sponsor
(Greece) Soulis Papadopoulos	(Uruguay) Sergio Leal	(Italy) Lotto	No shirt sponsor

== Transfers ==
Winter Transfer Window

== In ==
Squad #	Position	Player	Transferred From	Fee	Date
	DF	(Greece) (Albania) Alkis Dimitris	(Greece) Platanias	Free	19 June 2016
	FW	(Greece) Nikos Katsikokeris	(Greece) Ermis Zoniana	Free	20 June 2016
	DF	(Greece) Minas Tzanis	(Greece) Ermis Zoniana	Free	21 June 2016
	GK	(Greece) Manolis Stefanakos	(Greece) Panetolikos	Free	25 June 2016
	FW	(Uruguay) Sergio Leal	(Uruguay) Plaza Colonia	Free	28 June 2016
	FW	(Greece) Ioannis Karalis	(Greece) Lamia	Free	29 June 2016
	MF	(Greece) Anastasios Rousakis	(Greece) Apollon Smyrnis	Free	29 June 2016
	DF	(Greece) Angelos Zouboulakis	(Greece) Kerkyra	Free	30 June 2016
	MF	(Greece) Dimitrios Kiliaras	(Greece) Sparti	Free	1 July 2016
	DF	(Greece) Anastasios Tsoumagas	(Portugal) Neves FC	Free	3 July 2016
	MF	(Albania) Zani Kurti	Free agent	Free	7 July 2016
	FW	(Greece) Konstantinos Garefalakis	Free agent	Free	7 July 2016
	DF	(Greece) Manolis Genitsaridis	(Greece) Pyrasos Nea Anchialos	Free	7 July 2016
	DF	(Greece) Anastasios Kantoutsis	(Cyprus) Omonia	Free	13 July 2016
	MF	(Brazil) (Spain) Micheel	(Brazil) Boa EC	Free	31 July 2016
	FW	(Greece) Fotis Kaimakamoudis	(Greece) Fostiras	Free	4 August 2016
	GK	(Greece) Georgios Vasiliadis	(Greece) Veria	Free	8 August 2016
	MF	(Brazil) Elton Calé	(Greece) OFI Crete	Free	12 August 2016
	DF	(Greece) Stamatis Karras	(Greece) Panserraikos	Free	19 August 2016
	FW	(Argentina) (Italy) Mauro Poy	(Greece) Aris	Free	25 August 2016
	DF	(Greece) Giannis Kolokas	(Greece) Panegialios	Free	29 August 2016
	MF	(Greece) Giannis Gotsoulias	(Greece) Panachaiki	Free	7 September 2016
	DF	(Greece) Thomas Garaklidis	(Greece) Doxa Drama	Free	30 December 2016
	MF	(Greece) Christos Niaros	(Greece) Trikala	Free	3 January 2017
	DF	(Greece) Manolis Nikolakakis	(Greece) Trikala	Free	3 January 2017
	DF	(Greece) Christos Batzios	(Greece) Kavala	Free	5 January 2017
	MF	(Greece) Christos Mingas	(Greece) Trikala	Free	6 January 2017
	DF	(Greece) Georgios Papapanagiotou	(Greece) Trikala	Free	8 January 2017
	FW	(Albania) (Greece) Alexandros Bracjani	(Greece) Kavala	Free	8 January 2017
	MF	(Portugal) Serginho	(Greece) Trikala	Free	13 January 2017
	GK	(Albania) (Greece) Alexandros Leco	(Greece) Ionikos	Free	19 January 2017
	FW	(Greece) Periklis Vellinis	(Greece) Sparti	Free	26 January 2017

=== Promoted from youth system ===
Squad #	Position	Player	Date	Signed Until
	MF	(Greece) Vasilios Vogiatzis	10 September 2016	30 June 2017
	FW	(Greece) Georgios Lydakis	10 September 2016	30 June 2017
	FW	(Greece) Georgios Manousakis	10 September 2016	30 June 2017
	MF	(Greece) (Georgia (country)) David Beruashvili	10 September 2016	30 June 2017
	DF	(Greece) Georgios Polychronakis	10 September 2016	30 June 2017
	DF	(Greece) Nikolaos Sifakis	10 September 2016	30 June 2017
	GK	(Greece) Georgios Chaniotakis	10 September 2016	30 June 2017

Total spending: ▼0.00 €

== Out ==
Position	Player	Transferred To	Fee	Date
FW	(Greece) Ioannis Karalis	(Greece) Ionikos	Free	24 August 2016
FW	(Greece) Konstantinos Garefalakis	(Greece) Irodotos	Free	25 August 2016
DF	(Greece) Anastasios Kantoutsis	(Greece) Ilisiakos	Free	27 August 2016
DF	(Greece) Manolis Genitsaridis	(Greece) Atsalenios	Free	29 August 2016
MF	(Albania) Zani Kurti	Free agent	Free	1 September 2016
MF	(Greece) Anastasios Tsoumagas	(Greece) Irodotos	Free	23 December 2016
FW	(Greece) Georgios Lydakis	(Greece) Neoi Ergoteli	Internal move.	5 January 2017
DF	(Greece) (Albania) Alkis Dimitris	(Greece) AEEK INKA	Free	9 January 2017
DF	(Greece) Angelos Zouboulakis	(Greece) Kallithea	Free	9 January 2017
MF	(Brazil) Elton Calé	(Albania) FK Kukësi	Free	9 January 2017
DF	(Greece) Giannis Kolokas	(Greece) Panelefsiniakos	Free	10 January 2017
GK	(Greece) Manolis Stefanakos	Free agent	Free	10 January 2017
FW	(Argentina) (Italy) Mauro Poy	Free agent	Free	11 January 2017
DF	(Greece) Nikolaos Sifakis	(Greece) AE Mylopotamos	Free	17 January 2017
MF	(Greece) (Georgia (country)) David Beruashvili	(Greece) Tympaki	Free	20 January 2017
MF	(Greece) Dimitrios Kiliaras	(Greece) Irodotos	Free	22 January 2017
DF	(Greece) Georgios Polychronakis	(Greece) Tympaki	Free	3 February 2017

Total income: ▲€0.0

Expenditure: ▲€0.0

== Managerial changes ==
Outgoing manager	Manner of departure	Date of vacancy	Position in table	Incoming manager	Date of appointment
Vacant	Head coach appointment	--	--	(Greece) Giannis Chatzinikolaou	16 June 2016
(Greece) Giannis Chatzinikolaou	Sacked	25 October 2016	3rd	(Greece) Nikos Oustampasidis	26 October 2016
(Greece) Nikos Oustampasidis	Sacked	16 January 2017	3rd	(Greece) Soulis Papadopoulos	18 January 2017

== Kit ==
2016−17

Supplier: Lotto
Sponsor(s): None

Home	Away

Source: ergotelis.gr

Friendlies

Supplier: Lotto
Sponsor(s): None

Friendlies

Source: ergotelis.gr

== Pre-season and friendlies ==
=== Pre-season friendlies part A ===
Win Draw Loss

6 August 2016 Friendly	Anagennisi Giannitsa (Greece)	0 − 6	(Greece) Ergotelis	Giannitsa, Greece
18:00		Report	Katsikokeris 15', 16'; Kyzeridis 30' (o.g.); Manousakis 55', 65'; Karalis 75' (pen.)	Stadium: Giannitsa Stadium

10 August 2016 Friendly	Eordaikos (Greece)	1 − 1	(Greece) Ergotelis	Ptolemaida, Greece
18:00	Charalampidis 13'	Report	Leal 70'	Stadium: Municipal Ptolemaida Stadium

12 August 2016 Friendly	PAS Florina (Greece)	0 − 4	(Greece) Ergotelis	Florina, Greece
18:00		Report	Katsikokeris 20'; Kantoutsis 32'; Manousakis 52'; Garefalakis 80'	Stadium: Florina Municipal Stadium

17 August 2016 Friendly	Ergotelis (Greece)	1 − 0	(Greece) AEEK INKA	Heraklion, Crete, Greece
18:15	Christakis 81'	Report		Stadium: Pankritio Stadium

=== 12th Markomichelakis Tournament ===
Win Draw Loss

20 August 2016 Friendly	Giouchtas (Greece)	0 − 1	(Greece) Ergotelis	Archanes, Crete, Greece
17:00		Report	Lydakis 28'	Stadium: National Archanes Stadium

20 August 2016 Friendly	OFI Crete (Greece)	1 – 1 (1 – 3 p)	(Greece) Ergotelis	Archanes, Crete, Greece
19:00	Chanti 28' (pen.)	Report	Katsikokeris 41'	Stadium: National Archanes Stadium
	Penalties
	Milosavljev (penalty missed); Machado (penalty scored)		Leal (penalty scored); Micheel (penalty scored); Katsikokeris (penalty scored)

=== Pre-season friendlies part B ===
Win Draw Loss

24 August 2016 Friendly	Ergotelis (Greece)	1 − 1	(Greece) Ermis Zoniana	Heraklion, Crete, Greece
18:00	Leal 30' (pen.)	Report	Passialis 79'	Stadium: Pankritio Stadium

28 August 2016 Friendly	AEEK INKA (Greece)	1 − 3	(Greece) Ergotelis	Chania, Crete, Greece
18:00	Tsoumagas 52' (o.g.)	Report	Leal 5'; Katsikokeris 21'; Calé 57'	Stadium: Mournies Municipal Stadium

31 August 2016 Friendly	Panthiraikos (Greece)	3 − 1	(Greece) Ergotelis	Santorini, Greece
19:30	Loukas 51'; Zonas 56'; Perialis 60'	Report	Calé 3'	Stadium: Panthiraikos Municipal Stadium

3 September 2016 Friendly	Platanias (Greece)	4 − 2	(Greece) Ergotelis	Chania, Greece
18:30	Giakoumakis 44'; Manousos 51'; Apostolopoulos 57'; Papanikolaou 86'	Report	Manousakis 87'; Kaimakamoudis 90'	Stadium: Perivolia Municipal Stadium

=== Mid-season friendlies ===
Win Draw Loss

28 October 2016 Friendly	Ergotelis (Greece)	9 − 0	(Greece) PANO Malia	Heraklion, Crete, Greece
15:00	Poy 22'; Calé 30'; Karras 32'; Kaimakamoudis 35'; Lydakis 55'; Kiliaras 70', 77'; Manousakis 71', 80'	Report		Stadium: Pankritio Stadium, Training Ground

12 November 2016 Friendly	OFI Crete (Greece)	2 − 5	(Greece) Ergotelis	Heraklion, Crete, Greece
11:00	Chanti 4' (pen.); Manos 73'	Report	Micheel 18'; Poy 63'; Katsikokeris 76', 84', 86'	Stadium: Vardinogianneio Athletic Center

== Competitions ==
=== Overview ===
Competition	Started round	Current position / round	Final position / round	First match	Last match
Gamma Ethniki (Group 4)	1	1st / 30	1st − Champions	11 September 2016	21 May 2017
Gamma Ethniki Cup	First Round / Match-day 1	First Round / Match-day 2	First Round / Match-day 2	16 October 2016	14 December 2016

Last updated: 5 July 2016

== Gamma Ethniki ==
=== League table ===
Pos	Team	Pld	W	D	L	GF	GA	GD	Pts	Promotion or relegation
1	Ergotelis (C, P)	28	19	7	2	50	21	+29	64	Promotion to Football League
2	Ionikos	28	19	6	3	55	18	+37	63	
3	Agios Ierotheos	28	15	9	4	40	23	+17	54	
4	Ethnikos Piraeus	28	11	7	10	34	33	+1	40	
5	Atsalenios	28	12	4	12	37	43	−6	40	

Source: Hellenic Football Federation (in Greek)
Rules for classification: 1st points; 2nd head-to-head points; 3rd head-to-head goal difference
(C) Champions; (P) Promoted

== Results summary ==
Overall								Home						Away					
Pld	W	D	L	GF	GA	GD	Pts	W	D	L	GF	GA	GD	W	D	L	GF	GA	GD
28	19	7	2	50	21	+29	64	9	4	1	25	9	+16	10	3	1	25	12	+13

Last updated: 24 November 2016.
Source: Competitive matches

=== Results by Round ===
Round	1	2	3	4	5	6	7	8	9	10	11	12	13	14	15	16	17	18	19	20	21	22	23	24	25	26	27	28	29	30
Ground	A	H	A	H	A	H	−	A	H	A	H	A	H	H	A	H	A	H	A	H	A	−	H	A	H	A	H	A	A	H
Result	W	W	W	W	L	D	−	W	D	W	L	D	W	W	D	D	W	D	D	W	W	−	W	W	W	W	W	W	W	W
Position	2	1	1	1	3	3	5	3	3	3	3	3	2	2	2	2	2	2	2	2	2	2	2	2	2	2	2	1	1	1

Source: sport24.gr
A = Away; H = Home; W = Win; D = Draw; L = Loss

=== Matches ===
Win Draw Loss Postponed

11 September 2016 1	Proodeftiki	0 − 2	Ergotelis	Nikaia, Greece
17:00		Report	Leal 39' (pen.), 76'	Stadium: Nikaia Municipal Stadium; Referee: Aristotelis Diamantopoulos

18 September 2016 2	Ergotelis	2 − 0	Rodos	Heraklion, Crete, Greece
16:30	Kaimakamoudis 15'; Calé 18'	Report		Stadium: Pankritio Stadium; Referee: Andreas Gkamaris

25 September 2016 3	Atsalenios	1 − 2	Ergotelis	Heraklion, Crete, Greece
16:30	Saklamakis 78'	Report	Leal 11'; Dimitris 89'	Stadium: Atsalenios Stadium; Referee: Petros Tsagkarakis

2 October 2016 4	Ergotelis	2 − 0	Triglia Rafina	Heraklion, Crete, Greece
16:00	Kaimakamoudis 74'; Katsikokeris 79'	Report		Stadium: Pankritio Stadium; Referee: Georgios Stavroulakis

9 October 2016 5	Ionikos	2 − 0	Ergotelis	Nikaia, Greece
16:00	Karalis 17' (pen.); Argyriou 64'	Report		Stadium: Neapoli Stadium; Referee: Kiriakos Gkritzepis

24 October 2016 6	Ergotelis	2 − 2	Ialysos	Heraklion, Crete, Greece
15:00	Calé 10'; Filakouris 87' (o.g.)	Report	Spartalis 40'; Delaportas 45+2'	Stadium: Pankritio Stadium; Referee: Christos Kasselakis

7 November 2016 8	Ilisiakos	1 − 2	Ergotelis	Zografou, Athens, Greece
15:00	Ioannou 77'	Report	Katsikokeris 25'; Tsoumagas 90+5'	Stadium: Zografou Municipal Stadium; Referee: Panagiotis Kouloudis

23 November 2016 9 ^{1}	Ergotelis	0 − 0	AEEK INKA	Heraklion, Crete, Greece
15:00		Report		Stadium: Pankritio Stadium; Referee: Georgios Stavroulakis

27 November 2016 10	Ethnikos Piraeus	0 − 1	Ergotelis	Moschato, Greece
15:00		Report	Calé 4'	Stadium: Moschato Municipal Stadium; Referee: Stylianos Fotis

11 December 2016 12	Panthiraikos	2 − 2	Ergotelis	Santorini, Greece
15:00	Mkrtchyan 25'; Perialis 43'	Report	Katsikokeris 80'; Kiliaras 90+5'	Stadium: Municipal Panthiraikos Stadium; Referee: Konstantinos Perrakis

18 December 2016 13	Ergotelis	2 − 1	A.E. Kifisia	Heraklion, Crete, Greece
15:00	Kiliraras 15'; Leal 90+5' (pen.)	Report	Farinola 59'	Stadium: Pankritio Stadium; Referee: Georgios Tsagarakis

4 January 2017 11 ^{2}	Ergotelis	2 − 3	Agios Ierotheos	Heraklion, Crete, Greece
15:00	Vogiatzis 54'; Kaimakamoudis 56'	Report	Saganas 28'; Thanopoulos 41'; Souflas 74'	Stadium: Pankritio Stadium; Referee: Konstantinos Bertakis

15 January 2017 15	Thyella Rafina	0 − 0	Ergotelis	Rafina, Athens, Greece
15:00		Report		Stadium: Municipal Rafina Stadium; Referee: Panagiotis Koukoulas

22 January 2017 14 ^{3}	Ergotelis	2 − 0	Ermis Zoniana	Heraklion, Crete, Greece
15:00	Katsikokeris 33'; Leal 48' (pen.)	Report		Stadium: Pankritio Stadium; Referee: Konstantinos Antoniou

29 January 2017 17	Rodos	0 − 3	Ergotelis	Rhodes, Greece
14:00		Report	Leal 50'; Kaimakamoudis 65'; Vogiatzis 83'	Stadium: Diagoras Stadium; Referee: Evangelos Kordolemis

5 February 2017 18	Ergotelis	1 − 1	Atsalenios	Heraklion, Crete, Greece
15:00	Leal 50'	Report	Nikolakakis 2' (o.g.)	Stadium: Pankritio Stadium; Referee: Charalambos Sotiriadis

12 February 2012 19	Triglia Rafina	2 − 2	Ergotelis	Rafina, Athens, Greece
15:00	Karras 48' (o.g.); Potouridis 87'	Report	Katsikokeris 58', 68'	Stadium: Rafina Municipal Stadium; Referee: Georgios Lambrou

19 February 2017 20	Ergotelis	2 − 1	Ionikos	Heraklion, Crete, Greece
15:00	Katsikokeris 75', 77'	Report	Karalis 90+6'	Stadium: Pankritio Stadium; Referee: Angelos Zaravinos

25 February 2017 16 ^{4}	Ergotelis	0 − 0	Proodeftiki	Heraklion, Crete, Greece
15:00		Report		Stadium: Pankritio Stadium; Referee: Georgios Tsagkarakis

5 March 2017 21	Ialysos	1 − 2	Ergotelis	Ialysos, Rhodes, Greece
15:00	Chatzifountas 40+2'	Report	Batzios 61'; Katsikokeris 90+2' (pen.)	Stadium: Ekonomideio Municipal Stadium; Referee: Andreas Gkamaris

19 March 2013 23	Ergotelis	3 − 0	Ilisiakos	Heraklion, Crete, Greece
15:00	Leal 23' (pen.); Katsikokeris 38' (pen.); Kaimakamoudis 90+1'	Report		Stadium: Pankritio Stadium; Referee: Minas Kokkinakis

2 April 2017 24	AEEK INKA	1 − 2	Ergotelis	Chania, Crete, Greece
16:00	Vourvachakis 36'	Report	Nikolakakis 60'; Leal 84'	Stadium: Mournies Municipal Stadium; Referee: Charalambos Sotiriadis

9 April 2017 25	Ergotelis	2 − 0	Ethnikos Piraeus	Heraklion, Crete, Greece
16:00	Katsikokeris 42'; Serginho 83'	Report		Stadium: Pankritio Stadium; Referee: Minas Kokkinakis

23 April 2017 26	Agios Ierotheos	0 − 1	Ergotelis	Peristeri, Athens, Greece
16:30		Report	Katsikokeris 32'	Stadium: Agios Ierotheos Stadium; Referee: Evangelos Kordolemis

30 April 2017 27	Ergotelis	2 − 0	Panthiraikos	Heraklion, Crete, Greece
14:30	Leal 27'; Kaimakamoudis 90'	Report		Stadium: Pankritio Stadium; Referee: Charalambos Kalogeropoulos

7 May 2017 28	A.E. Kifisia	1 − 3	Ergotelis	Kifissia, Athens, Greece
17:00	Kyriazis 57'	Report	Katsikokeris 8', 15', 73'	Stadium: Kifisia Municipal Stadium; Referee: Ioannis Kakridis

14 May 2017 29	Ermis Zoniana	1 − 3	Ergotelis	Zoniana, Crete, Greece
17:00	Plousis 88'	Report	Vellinis 15'; Leal 22', 26'	Stadium: Zoniana Municipal Stadium; Referee: Christos Kasselakis

21 May 2017 30	Ergotelis	3 − 1	Thyella Rafina	Heraklion, Crete, Greece
17:00	Katsikokeris 32', 38', 65' (pen.)	Report	Zechio 22'	Stadium: Pankritio Stadium; Referee: Charalabos Sotiriadis

1. Matchday 9 vs. AEEK INKA, originally meant to be held 20 November 2016, was postponed until 23 November 2016 via a direct order of the HFF, in association with UEFA and FIFA, in response to the arson of Super League Chief Refereeing Officer Georgios Mpikas' house in Ierissos, Chalkidiki.

2. Matchday 11 vs. Agios Ierotheos, originally meant to be held 4 December 2016, was postponed until 14 December 2016 by the HFF, due to Agios Ierotheos not being able to travel by sea to Crete for the match as a result of the Panhellenic Seamen's Federation strike. This strike also affected the Gamma Ethniki Cup match vs. A.E. Kifisia which was eventually held on 14 December 2016, thus pushing back Matchday 11 to 4 January 2017.

3. Matchday 14 vs. Ermis Zoniana, originally meant to be held 8 January 2017, was postponed until 22 January 2017 due to severe weather conditions.

4. Due to multiple matches being postponed throughout the season, matchday 16 vs. Proodeftiki, originally meant to be held in January 2017, was postponed until 25 February 2017.

== Gamma Ethniki Cup ==
=== First round ===
==== Match-day 1 ====
Home team	Score	Away team
AEEK INKA	1 − 1 (10 − 11 pen.)	Ergotelis (Q)

==== Matches ====
Win Draw Loss

16 October 2016 Match-day 1	AEEK INKA	1 − 1 (a.e.t.) (10 – 11 p)	Ergotelis	Chania, Crete, Greece
15:00	Tsikoudakis 44'	Report	Micheel 71' (pen.)	Stadium: Mournies Municipal Stadium; Referee: Georgios Stavroulakis
	Penalties
	Vestakis (penalty scored); Papathanasiou (penalty scored); Perdikakis (penalty scored); Kompegennitakis (penalty scored); Drakakis (penalty scored); Galanidis (penalty scored); Kitrakis (penalty scored); Stathinakis (penalty scored); Paligeorgos (penalty scored); Georgiou (penalty scored); Vestakis (penalty missed)		Poy (penalty scored); Micheel (penalty scored); Manousakis (penalty scored); Polychronakis (penalty scored); Katsikokeris (penalty scored); Kolokas (penalty scored); Gotsoulias (penalty scored); Beruashvili (penalty scored); Vogiatzis (penalty scored); Vasiliadis (penalty scored); Poy (penalty scored)

==== Match-day 2 ====
Home team	Score	Away team
Ergotelis	1 − 2	A.E. Kifisia (Q)

==== Matches ====
Win Draw Loss

14 December 2016 Match-day 2 ^{1}	Ergotelis	1 − 2	A.E. Kifisia	Heraklion, Crete, Greece
14:00	Kaimakamoudis 7'	Report	Karvounidis 30'; Farinola 87'	Stadium: Pankritio Stadium; Referee: Christos Kasselakis

1. Matchday 2 vs. A.E. Kifisia, originally meant to be held 13 November 2016, was postponed until 7 December 2016 via a direct order of the HFF, in association with UEFA and FIFA, in response to the arson of Super League Chief Refereeing Officer Georgios Mpikas' house in Ierissos, Chalkidiki. Then, it was once again postponed until 14 December 2016 due to A.E. Kifisia not being able to travel by sea to Crete for the match as a result of the Panhellenic Seamen's Federation strike.

== Statistics ==
Player has departed in mid-season

=== Goal scorers ===
No.	Pos.	Nation	Name	Greek Gamma Ethniki	Gamma Ethniki Cup	Total
	FW	(Greece)	Nikos Katsikokeris	18	0	18
	FW	(Uruguay)	Sergio Leal	12	0	12
	FW	(Greece)	Fotis Kaimakamoudis	6	1	7
	MF	(Brazil)	Elton Calé	3	0	3
	MF	(Greece)	Dimitrios Kiliaras	2	0	2
	MF	(Greece)	Vasilios Vogiatzis	2	0	2
	DF	(Greece) (Albania)	Alkis Dimitris	1	0	1
	DF	(Greece)	Anastasios Tsoumagas	1	0	1
	DF	(Greece)	Christos Batzios	1	0	1
	DF	(Greece)	Manolis Nikolakakis	1	0	1
	MF	(Portugal)	Serginho	1	0	1
	FW	(Greece)	Periklis Vellinis	1	0	1
	MF	(Brazil) (Spain)	Micheel	0	1	1
	-	-	Opponent's own Goals	1	0	1
TOTAL				50	2	52

Last updated: 5 July 2016
