= 2016–17 Gamma Ethniki Cup =

Tournament details
- Country: Greece
- Teams: 61

Final positions
- Champions: A.E. Karaiskakis
- Runners-up: Achaiki

Tournament statistics
- Matches played: 60
- Goals scored: 158 (2.63 per match)

The 2016–17 Gamma Ethniki Cup is the 3rd season of the competition, since its official establishment in 2013, and the first to take place after the 2015–16 edition was not held. In this competition, only the clubs of the Gamma Ethniki can participate. The 2016–17 Gamma Ethniki Cup winner will compete at the end of the season with the winner of the 2016–17 Amateurs' Cup for the Amateurs' Super Cup Greece.

== First round ==
In first round of the competition, the clubs in each group compete against each other in singles matches (overtime and penalties apply) until one club is declared Group winner. The pairs are the result of random drawing. The match days of the First Round have been set for 16 October 2016 for Match-Day 1, 13 November 2016 for Match-Day 2, 14 December 2016 for Match-Day 3 and 22 February 2017 for each Group Final. However, all matches scheduled for 13 November were postponed via a direct order of the HFF, in association with UEFA and FIFA, in response to the arson of Super League Chief Refereeing Officer Georgios Βikas' house in Ierissos, Chalkidiki. As a result, all Match-Day 2 matches were set for 7 December 2016, while Match-Day 3 matches were set for 21 December 2016.

== Group 1 ==
Location of teams in Group 1 of 2016–17 Gamma Ethniki

=== Matchday 1 ===
Team 1	Score	Team 2
Orfeas Xanthi	3–2	AE Pontion Vatolakkos
AO Kardia	0 − 0 (0 − 2 pen.)	Almopos Aridaea
Makedonikos Foufas	0–1	APE Langadas
Apollon Kalamarias	1 − 0 o.t	Doxa Drama
Kampaniakos	3 − 3 (4 − 5 pen.)	Nestos Chrysoupoli
Doxa Proskinites	2–1	Eordaikos
Naoussa	2–1	Apollon Paralimnio

- Kavala advance to Match-day 2 on walkover.

=== Matchday 2 ===
Team 1	Score	Team 2
Nestos Chrysoupoli	0–2	Apollon Kalamarias
Orfeas Xanthi	2–0	Doxa Proskinites
Kavala	0 − 0 (3 − 4 pen.)	Almopos Aridaea
APE Langadas	2 − 1 o.t	Naoussa

=== Matchday 3 ===
Team 1	Score	Team 2
Apollon Kalamarias	4–1	Orfeas Xanthi
APE Langadas	2–1	Almopos Aridaea

=== Group Final ===
Team 1	Score	Team 2
APE Langadas	1–2	Apollon Kalamarias

== Group 2 ==
Location of teams in Group 2 of 2016–17 Gamma Ethniki

=== Matchday 1 ===
Team 1	Score	Team 2
A.E. Karaiskakis	1–0	Ethnikos Filippiada
A.E Istiaia	2–1	Rigas Feraios
Olympiacos Volos	0–2	Apollon Larissa
Niki Volos	3–0	Thesprotos
Asteras Petriti	0–3	Mavroi Aetoi Eleftherochori
Tilikratis	2–1	Diagoras Sevasti
Amvrakia Kostakioi	1 − 1 (3−0 p)	Achilleas Neokaisareia
Pierikos	0 − 0 (9−10 p)	Pydna Kitros

=== Matchday 2 ===
Team 1	Score	Team 2
Amvrakia Kostakioi	1–2	Apollon Larissa
Pydna Kitros	2–0	Tilikratis
A.E. Karaiskakis	4 − 4 (4−3 p)	Mavroi Aetoi Eleftherochori
Niki Volos	1–0	A.E Istiaia

=== Matchday 3 ===
Team 1	Score	Team 2
Apollon Larissa	1 − 1 (3−4 p)	A.E. Karaiskakis
Pydna Kitros	2–3	Niki Volos

=== Group Final ===
Team 1	Score	Team 2
A.E. Karaiskakis	1–0	Niki Volos

== Group 3 ==
Location of teams in Group 3 of 2016–17 Gamma Ethniki

=== Matchday 1 ===
Team 1	Score	Team 2
Chalkida	2–3	Achaiki
Zevgolateio	4 − 3 o.t	Thiva
Tsiklitiras Pylos	1 − 1 (1 − 3 pen.)	Panachaiki
Panarkadikos	1–0	Doxa Megalopoli
Panargiakos	3–1	Ermionida
Asteras Amaliada	3–0	Loutraki
PAO Varda	2–3	Aiolikos

- Fostiras advance to Match-day 2 on walkover.

=== Matchday 2 ===
Team 1	Score	Team 2
Achaiki	1–0	Fostiras
Zevgolateio	3–1	Panargiakos
Asteras Amaliada	2–1	Panarkadikos
Panachaiki	1–0	Aiolikos

=== Matchday 3 ===
Team 1	Score	Team 2
Zevgolateio	0–1	Panachaiki
Asteras Amaliada	0–2	Achaiki

=== Group Final ===
Team 1	Score	Team 2
Panachaiki	0 − 0 (2 − 3 pen.)	Achaiki

== Group 4 ==
Location of teams in Group 4 of 2016–17 Gamma Ethniki

=== Matchday 1 ===
Team 1	Score	Team 2
Rodos	1–0	Ialysos
Atsalenios	2–1	Ermis Zoniana
AEEK INKA	1 − 1 (10 − 11 pen.)	Ergotelis
A.E. Kifisia	4–0	Proodeftiki
Ilisiakos	2 − 2 (4 − 2 pen.)	Ionikos
Agios Ierotheos	1–0	Thyella Rafina
Triglia Rafina	1–0	Ethnikos

- Panthiraikos advance to Match-day 2 on walkover.

=== Matchday 2 ===
Team 1	Score	Team 2
Agios Ierotheos	4–0	Triglia Rafina
Ergotelis	1–2	A.E. Kifisia
Panthiraikos	0–1	Rodos
Ilisiakos	1–3	Atsalenios

=== Matchday 3 ===
Team 1	Score	Team 2
Agios Ierotheos	1 − 1 (2 − 4 pen.)	A.E. Kifisia
Rodos	0–2	Atsalenios

=== Group Final ===
Team 1	Score	Team 2
A.E. Kifisia	3–0	Atsalenios

== Bracket ==
Semi-finals
26 March 2017 – Grevena Municipal Stadium
Apollon Kalamarias	2
A.E. Karaiskakis	3
26 March 2017 – Argos Municipal Stadium
Achaiki	1 (5)
A.E. Kifisia	1 (4)

Final
28 May 2017 – Panetolikos Stadium
A.E. Karaiskakis	1
Achaiki	0

== Semi-finals ==
In the Second Round (Semi-finals), the four Group winners compete on neutral Ground on single knockout matches.

26 March 2017
14:30

Apollon Kalamarias	2–3	A.E. Karaiskakis
Avramidis 33' (o.g.); Symelidis 67'	Report	Zigeridis 30'; Giftokostas 72'; Maziotis 90'

Grevena Municipal Stadium
Referee: Konstantinos Panytsidis (Kozani)

26 March 2017
14:30

Achaiki	1–1 (a.e.t.)	A.E. Kifisia
Kostoulas 55'	Report	Souleles 20'
Penalties
Konstantinopoulos (penalty scored); Lampropoulos (penalty scored); Mikelatos (penalty scored); Kostoulas (penalty missed); Georgopoulos (penalty scored); Angelopoulos (penalty scored)	5–4	Karakostas (penalty scored); Rentzis (penalty missed); Spiliotakis (penalty scored); Gezos (penalty scored); Tegousis (penalty scored); Tabakis (penalty missed)

Argos Municipal Stadium
Referee: Dimitrios Gkiafis (Aetolia-Acarnania)

== Final ==
28 May 2017
17:00

A.E. Karaiskakis	1–0	Achaiki
Kousidis 59'	Report

Panetolikos Stadium
Referee: Panagiotis Kekelos (Aetolia-Acarnania)

Karaiskakis	Achaiki

A.E. Karaikskakis:
GK	?	(Greece) Apostolos Androutsos
DF	?	(Greece) Nikolaos Papanikou
DF	?	(Greece) Spiros Lamprou
DF	?	(Greece) Konstantinos Chartsias	(yellow card) 32'
DF	?	(Greece) Aristotelis Karagiannidis
MF	?	(Greece) Alexandros Veletis
MF	?	(United States) George Collins	(substituted off) 92'
MF	?	(Greece) German Datidis
MF	?	(Greece) Nikolaos Gyftokostas
FW	?	(Greece) Nikos Kousidis	(yellow card) 77'	(substituted off) 80'
FW	?	(Greece) Sokratis Evangelou	(substituted off) 46'
Substitutes:
GK	?	(Greece) Apostolos Siaravas
DF	?	(Greece) Apostolos Avramidis	(substituted on) 80'
DF	?	(Greece) Marios Kapsalis
MF	?	(Greece) Alexandros Bekatoros
MF	?	(Greece) Giannis Goulas	(substituted on) 92'
MF	?	(Greece) Alexandros Maziotis
FW	?	(Greece) Charalampos Zygeridis	(substituted on) 46'
Manager:
(Greece) Nikos Theodosiadis

Achaiki:
GK	?	(Greece) Athanasios Drakopoulos
DF	?	(Greece) Georgios Ntazos	(yellow card) 28'
DF	?	(Greece) Christos Stefanopoulos
DF	?	(Greece) Spiros Sotiropoulos
DF	?	(Albania) Rildi Charizi
DF	?	(Greece) Christos Drimalas	(substituted off) 69'
MF	?	(Greece) Panagiotis Konstantinopoulos	(yellow card) 51' (yellow-red card) 90'
MF	?	(Greece) Joachim Apostolopoulos
MF	?	(Greece) Ilias Georgopoulos	(substituted off) 79'
FW	?	(Greece) Leonidas Kostoulas
FW	?	(Greece) Antonis Roumpatos	(substituted off) 63'
Substitutes:
GK	?	(Greece) Dionysis Ventouris
DF	?	(Greece) Georgios Petropoulos
DF	?	(Greece) Nikos Anagnostopoulos	(substituted on) 69'
MF	?	(Greece) Ilias Papadatos
MF	?	(Greece) Giannis Makris
MF	?	(Greece) Leonidas Aggelopoulos	(substituted on) 63'
FW	?	(Greece) Ilias Mantas	(substituted on) 79'
Manager:
(Greece) Alexandros Gavrilopoulos

Match officials

- Assistant referees:
  - Spiros Chouliaras (Aetoloacarnania)
  - Konstantinos Kalampokis (Aetoloacarnania)
- Fourth official: Vasilios Panagiotopoulos (Aetoloacarnania)

Match rules

- 90 minutes.
- 30 minutes of extra-time if necessary.
- Penalty shoot-out if scores still level.
- Seven named substitutes.
- Maximum of three substitutions.
