= Greek FCA Winners' Championship =

Men's association football league in Greece

F.C.A. Champion Teams Championship
- Organising body: Hellenic Football Federation
- Founded: 1968; 58 years ago
- First season: Protathlima Protathlitrion Omadon Enoseon Podosferikon Somation, Greek: Πρωτάθλημα Πρωταθλητριών Ομάδων Ενώσεων Ποδοσφαιρικών Σωματείων, lit. 'Football Clubs Associations Champion Teams Championship' (1968)
- Country: Greece
- Confederation: UEFA
- Number of clubs: 56 (since 2022)
- Level on pyramid: 3 (1968–1977); 5 (1987–1988, 1999, 2000–2001, 2012); 4 (2013–2016, 2022–2026)
- Promotion to: Gamma Ethniki
- Relegation to: Football Clubs Associations Championships
- Most championships: Anagennisi Arta (4 titles)
- Website: epo.gr
- Current: 2025

The Football Clubs Associations Champion Teams Championship (Greek: Πρωτάθλημα Πρωταθλητριών Ομάδων Ενώσεων Ποδοσφαιρικών Σωματείων) is a men's association football league contested annually by the most recent winners of all local Football Clubs Associations championships in Greece. It is not considered part of the Greek football league system, due to a lack of formal structure, requiring all local F.C.A. championships to have been completed prior to its start.

The F.C.A. Champion Teams Championship was founded in 1968, and held annually during 1968−1977 going by the name "Amateur Championship" as a means of achieving promotion to the formally-structured Beta Ethniki (the official 2nd tier of the Greek football league system, renamed in 2010 to Football League).

As of 1987, the F.C.A. Champion Teams Championship role was diminished to determining promotion to the Delta Ethniki (the fourth tier of the Greek football league system) by the local FCA champions. In fact, during the 2002−03 season, due to a re-structuring of the Greek football league system, the F.C.A. Champion Teams Championship was contested by Delta Ethniki Group winners, as a means of determining which clubs would eventually earn promotion to the Gamma Ethniki (thus effectively cutting down the number of promoting teams from 10 to 5, winners being determined in single knockout matches held at neutral grounds). The 19th edition of the competition took place during the 2011−12 post-season period.

On July 25, 2012 the Hellenic Football Federation decided to effectively neglect the outcome of the 2012 edition of the competition, thus allowing all local FCA champions to promote to the Delta Ethniki. The competition was not abolished however, and after merging the Delta and Gamma Ethniki into an amateur third level football league comprising six (and later four) Groups, the F.C.A. Champion Teams Championship was re-purposed to determine promotion from local competitions to the national level. In the 22nd edition of the competition (2015), the 14 Group winners earned promotion to the Gamma Ethniki, while the 2016 edition allowed twice as much clubs (28 in total, including Group runners-up) to advance to the Gamma Ethniki.

Anagennisi Arta is the most successful club, having reached the first place 4 times.

== 1968–1977 winners ==
The winners of the single knockout matches that were held as part of the "Amateur Championship" between local FCA champions in the years spanning between the 1967–68 and 1976–77 seasons were promoted to the Beta Ethniki.

1968	Argonaftis Piraeus • Megas Alexandros Thessaloniki
1969	Anagennisi Arta • Anagennisi Karditsa
1970	Pandramaikos • Apollon Krya Vrysi • A.O. Karditsa • Panaspropyrgiakos • Ergotelis • Panargiakos
1971	Orestis Orestiada • Naoussa • Orchomenos • P.A.O. Rouf • Orfeas Egaleo • Paniliakos
1972	Moudania • Thiva • Anagennisi Epanomi • Ilisiakos • Phoebus Kremasti • Pannemeatikos
1973	Nestos Chrysoupoli • Niki Polygyros • Achilleas Farsalon • Lamia • Panetolikos • Panarkadikos • Olympiakos Neon Liosion • Syros • Apollon Mytilene
1974	Ethnikos Sidirokastro • Kozani • Makedonikos Siatista • Dimitra Trikala • Patras • Doxa Vyronas • Moschato • Diagoras
1975	Akrites Sykies • Kampaniakos • Rigas Feraios • Ethnikos Asteras • Agios Dimitrios • Amfiali • Orfeas Egaleo
1976	Kilkisiakos • Apollon Kalamarias • Ethnikos Sidirokastro • Anagennisi Arta • Niki Volos • Paniliakos • Kallithea • Irodotos
1977	Makedonikos • Edessaikos • Thyella Serres • Elassona • Chalkida • Messolonghi • Agios Dimitrios • Ionikos

== 1987–2001 winners ==
As of the 1986–87 and until the 2000–01 season the winners of the single knockout matches, contested by local FCA champions, were promoted to the Delta Ethniki. Due to the fact that the latter was organized into 4 Groups during these years, it was impossible for all FCA Winners' Champions to earn promotion to the Delta Ethniki.

1987	Aiginiakos • Evros Soufli • Astrapi Mesopotamia • Amvrakia Arta • Olympiakos Kerkyra • Thyella Filotas • Minoiki Heraklion • Anagennisi Ierapetra • Phoebus Kremasti • Apollon Eretria • Pankorinthiakos • Agrampeli Grevena
1988	Atsalenios, AO Chania • Kos, Panthiraikos • Pamisos Messini, Pelopas Kiato • Messolonghi, Asteras Amaliada • Pallamiaki, PAO Kyriakio • Thyella Eleousa, Kentavros Volos • Almopos Aridaea, Apollon Litochoro • Tilikratis, Thesprotos • Panargiakos Argos Orestiko, Makedonikos Siatista • Serres '85, Ambelokipi Drama • Aspida Xanthi, Orestis Orestiada
1999	Orfeas Komotini • Doxa Amygdaleonas • Evosmos • Megas Alexandros Kalochori • Panargiakos Argos Orestiko • Achilleas Mparas • Iraklis Volos • Lefkimmi • Skoufas Kompoti • Panathinaikos Skagiopouleio • Iliakos Lechaina • Asteras Drepano • Olympiakos Anthili • Agios Dimitrios • Ilisiakos • OFI '94 • Apollon Kalythies • Aegeas Plomari
2000	Α.Ε. Kastoria, Akritas Nea Kromni • Epameinondas Leuctra, Anagennisi Arta • Olympiakos Chersonissos, Dafni Dafnonas • Pyrsos Grevena, Kassandra • Agioi Anargyroi, Iraklis Roditsa • Aias Salamina, Kos • Ptolemaida, Megas Alexandros Irakleia • Artaki, Agia Eleousa • Asteras Amaliada, Atromitos Piraeus
2001	Orfeas Souroti • Kallikratia • Orfeas Elefteroupoli • Iraklis Chalki • Svoronos • Alexandreia • A.E. Irakleio • Stylida • Ilisiakos • Aetos Petsali • Phaeakas Kato Korakiana • Messolonghi • Mani Piraeus • Ermis Korydallos • Thyella Patras • Rodos • Kissamikos • Aiolikos

== 2012–2022 winners ==
In 2012, the Hellenic Football Federation re-instated the F.C.A. Champion Teams Championship in order for local champions to earn promotion to the recently re-formatted Gamma Ethniki. The Table below presents all F.C.A. Champion Teams Championship winners, as well as clubs also earning promotion to the Gamma Ethniki as runners-up (where indicated).

2012	Asteras Magiko, PAO Kosmio (runner-up) • Iraklis Ampelokipi, Doxa Petroussa (runner-up) • Ethnikos Malgara, Enosi Apostolos Pavlos (runner-up) • Makedonikos Kozani F.C., Panargiakos Argos Orestiko (w.o) • Meteora, Anagennisi Perivoli (runner-up) • Rigas Feraios, Achilleas Neokaisareia (runner-up) • Euboekos, Achilleas Domokos (runner-up) • Aris Aitoliko, Keravnos Thesprotiko (runner-up) • Iasonas Nea Liosia, A.O Pefki (runner-up) • Dikaios, APO Nikolakakis (runner-up) • Pelopas Kiato, Panelefsiniakos (runner-up) • Doxa Nea Manolada, Ethnikos Sageika (runner-up) • Ethnikos Meligala, Portocheliakos (runner-up) • Kissamikos, A.E. Katsampas (runner-up)
2013	Nestos Chrysoupoli • Doxa Pentalofos • Moudania • Kastoria • Thesprotos • Machitis Terpsithea • Kymi • Preveza • Doxa Vyronas • Mykonos • Thyella Rafina • PAO Varda • Messiniakos • A.O. Agios Nikolaos
2014	Ethnikos Alexandroupoli • Thermaikos • Apollon Arnaia • Thyella Filotas • Flamouli • Pyrasos • Anagennisi Arta • Opountios • Ethnikos Piraeus • Aiolikos • Loutraki • Zakynthiakos • Ermis Kiveri • Anagennisi Ierapetra
2015	Nestos Chrysoupoli • APE Langadas • Apollon Krya Vrysi • Eordaikos • A.E. Farkadona • Pydna Kitros • Chalkida • Acheron Kanallaki • A.E. Irakleio • Kanaris Nenita • Ialysos • A.O. Levante • Sparta • Ermis Zoniana
2016	Orfeas Xanthi, Doxa Proskinites (runner-up) • A.O. Kardia, Apollon Paralimnio (runner-up) • Almopos Aridaea, Naoussa (runner-up) • Makedonikos Foufas, A.E. Pontion Vatolakkos (runner-up) • Mavroi Aetoi Eleftherochori, Asteras Petriti (runner-up) • Apollon Larissa, Diagoras Sevasti (runner-up) • Thiva, A.E. Istiaia (runner-up) • Tilikratis, Amvrakia Kostakioi (runner-up) • Proodeftiki, Agios Ierotheos (runner-up) • Rodos, Panthiraikos (runner-up) • Thyella Rafina, A.O. Zevgolateio (runner-up) • Achaiki, Asteras Amaliada (runner-up) • Tsiklitiras Pylos, Doxa Megalopolis (runner-up) • Atsalenios, AEEK INKA (runner-up)
2022	Vyron Kavala, Panthrakikos, Kampaniakos • AO Chanioti, Svoronos, PAO Kristoni • Asteras Petriti, Apollon Parga, Kastoria • Makedonikos Foufas, Dotieas Agia, Digenis Neochori • APS Patras, Paniliakos, Pangytheatikos • Moschato, Panargiakos, Chalkida • Agia Paraskevi, Vyzas Megara, Tympaki • Aris Petroupolis, Ialysos, Marko

== See also ==
- Greek football league system
- Football records and statistics in Greece

== Sources ==
- "ΑΘΛΗΤΙΚΗ ΗΧΩ"-29ης Ιουνίου 1987 (Greek)
- "ΑΘΛΗΤΙΚΗ ΗΧΩ"-6ης Ιουνίου 1988 (Greek)
- "ΑΘΛΗΤΙΚΗ ΗΧΩ"-3ης Ιουνίου 1999 (Greek)
- "ΑΘΛΗΤΙΚΗ ΗΧΩ"-5ης Ιουνίου 2000 (Greek)
- "ΑΘΛΗΤΙΚΗ ΗΧΩ"-5ης Ιουνίου 2001 (Greek)
- "ΑΘΛΗΤΙΚΗ ΗΧΩ"-22ας Ιουνίου 2003 (Greek)
