= 2016–17 Gamma Ethniki =

Gamma Ethniki
- Season: 2016–17

The 2016–17 Gamma Ethniki was the 34th season since the official establishment of the third tier of Greek football in 1983. It started on 11 September 2016 and ended at May 2017.

61 teams were separated into four groups, according to geographical criteria.

Ethnikos Neo Agioneri, Zakynthos and Doxa Nea Manolada withdrew from the league before the group draw.

== Group 1 ==
=== Teams ===
Location of teams in Group 1 of 2016–17 Gamma Ethniki

Team	Location	Last season
Nestos Chrysoupoli	Chrysoupoli	Group 1, 2nd
Doxa Proskinites	Proskinites	Thrace FCA champion, FCA Winners' Championship Group 1 winner
Apollon Kalamarias	Kalamaria	Group 1, 5th
Orfeas Xanthi	Xanthi	Xanthi FCA champion, FCA Winners' Championship Group 1 runner-up
Kavala	Kavala	Group 1, 4th
AO Kardia	Kardia	Macedonia FCA champion, FCA Winners' Championship Group 2 winner
Apollon Paralimnio	Paralimnio	Serres FCA champion, FCA Winners' Championship Group 2 runner-up
Almopos Aridea	Aridaea	Pella FCA champion, FCA Winners' Championship Group 3 winner
APE Langadas	Langadas	Group 1, 6th
Kampaniakos	Chalastra	Group 1, 8th
Naoussa	Naousa	Imathia FCA champion, FCA Winners' Championship Group 3 runner-up
Makedonikos Foufas	Foufas	Kozani FCA champion, FCA Winners' Championship Group 4 winner
Eordaikos	Ptolemaida	Group 1, 9th
Doxa Drama	Drama	Group 1, 3rd
~~AE Pontion Vatolakkos~~	~~Vatolakkos~~	~~Grevena FCA champion, FCA Winners' Championship Group 4 runner-up~~

=== Standings ===
Pos	Team	Pld	W	D	L	GF	GA	GD	Pts	Promotion or relegation
1	Apollon Kalamarias (C, P)	28	25	1	2	75	16	+59	73 (Note: Apollon Kalamaria deducted three points for this season by Hellenic Football Federation.)	Promotion to Football League
2	Doxa Dramas (P)	28	22	3	3	67	16	+51	69	Promotion to Football League
3	APE Langadas	28	16	2	10	38	30	+8	50	
4	Nestos Chrysoupoli	28	14	3	11	37	35	+2	45	
5	Orfeas Xanthi	28	11	11	6	31	22	+9	44	
6	Kavala	28	11	10	7	43	26	+17	43	
7	Apollon Paralimnio	28	12	6	10	44	23	+21	42	
8	Naoussa	28	11	7	10	28	32	−4	40	
9	Kampaniakos	28	12	2	14	34	44	−10	38	
10	AO Kardia	28	10	7	11	33	38	−5	35 (Note: AO Kardia deducted two points for this season and also two points for the 2017–18 season by Hellenic Football Federation.)	
11	Makedonikos Foufas	28	9	5	14	29	34	−5	32	
12	Almopos Aridea	28	9	3	16	24	31	−7	30	
13	Doxa Proskinites	28	6	7	15	26	46	−20	25	
14	Eordaikos	28	4	5	19	23	68	−45	17	
15	AE Pontion Vatolakkos (R)	28	1	2	25	4	75	−71	−1 (Note: AE Pontion Vatolakkos withdrew from the league on 1 February 2017. They were deducted six points for this season and also six points for the 2016–17 season by Hellenic Football Federation.)	Relegation to FCA championships

Source: Hellenic Football Federation (in Greek)
Rules for classification: 1st points; 2nd head-to-head points; 3rd head-to-head goal difference
(C) Champions; (P) Promoted; (R) Relegated

== Group 2 ==
=== Teams ===
Location of teams in Group 2 of 2016–17 Gamma Ethniki

Team	Location	Last season
Pydna Kitros	Kitros	Group 2, 4th
Pierikos	Katerini	Group 2, 7th
Mavroi Aetoi Eleftherochori	Eleftherochori	Trikala FCA champion, FCA Winners' Championship Group 5 winner
Diagoras Sevasti	Sevasti	Pieria FCA champion, FCA Winners' Championship Group 6 runner-up
Ethnikos Filippiada	Filippiada	Group 2, 9th
Asteras Petriti	Petriti	Kerkyra FCA champion, FCA Winners' Championship Group 5 runner-up
Thesprotos	Igoumenitsa	Group 2, 5th
A.E. Karaiskakis	Arta	Group 2, 2nd
Apollon Larissa	Larissa	Larissa FCA champion, FCA Winners' Championship Group 6 winner
A.E Istiaia	Istiaia	Euboea FCA champion, FCA Winners' Championship Group 7 runner-up
Achilleas Neokaisareia	Neokaisareia	Group 2, 8th
Niki Volos	Nea Ionia Volos	Group 2, 3rd
Rigas Feraios	Velestino	Group 2, 6th
Olympiacos Volos 1937	Volos	Football League, 17th
Tilikratis	Lefkada	Preveza-Lefkada FCA champion, FCA Winners' Championship Group 8 winner
Amvrakia Kostakioi	Arta	Arta FCA champion, FCA Winners' Championship Group 8 runner-up

=== Standings ===
Pos	Team	Pld	W	D	L	GF	GA	GD	Pts	Promotion or relegation
1	Apollon Larissa (C, P)	30	23	4	3	64	17	+47	73	Promotion to Football League
2	Karaiskakis (P)	30	20	6	4	43	14	+29	66	Promotion to Football League
3	Olympiacos Volos 1937	30	18	8	4	46	16	+30	62	
4	Diagoras Sevasti	30	19	4	7	47	27	+20	61	
5	Pydna Kitros	30	15	8	7	42	24	+18	53	
6	Niki Volos	30	15	5	10	36	30	+6	50	
7	Tilikratis	30	11	10	9	28	28	0	43	
8	A.E Istiaia	30	11	2	17	29	39	−10	35	
9	Thesprotos	30	10	4	16	36	40	−4	34	
10	Pierikos	30	8	9	13	21	35	−14	33	
11	Rigas Feraios	30	8	8	14	35	46	−11	32	
12	Amvrakia Kostakioi	30	9	3	18	26	42	−16	30	
13	Mavroi Aetoi Eleftherochori	30	7	9	14	25	42	−17	30	
14	Ethnikos Filippiada	30	6	10	14	22	37	−15	28	
15	Achilleas Neokaisareia (R)	30	7	5	18	30	54	−24	26	Relegation to FCA championships
16	Asteras Petriti (R)	30	3	5	22	26	54	−28	14	Relegation to FCA championships

Source: Hellenic Football Federation (in Greek)
Rules for classification: 1st points; 2nd head-to-head points; 3rd head-to-head goal difference
(C) Champions; (P) Promoted; (R) Relegated

== Group 3 ==
=== Teams ===
Location of teams in Group 3 of 2016–17 Gamma Ethniki

Team	Location	Last season
Tsiklitiras Pylos	Pylos	Messenia FCA champion, FCA Winners' Championship Group 13 winner
Zevgolateio	Zevgolateio	Corinthia FCA champion, FCA Winners' Championship Group 11 runner-up
Panargiakos	Argos	Group 3, 2nd
Chalkida	Chalkida	Group 3, 9th
PAO Varda	Varda	Group 3, 5th
Achaiki	Kato Achaia	Achaia FCA champion, FCA Winners' Championship Group 12 winner
Panarkadikos	Tripoli	Group 3, 3rd
Fostiras	Tavros	Group 4, 2nd
Asteras Amaliada	Amaliada	Elis FCA champion, FCA Winners' Championship Group 12 runner-up
Thiva	Thiva	Boeotia FCA champion, FCA Winners' Championship Group 7 winner
Panachaiki	Patras	Football League, 16th
Enosi Ermionida	Kranidi	Group 3, 8th
A.O.Loutraki	Loutraki	Group 3, 6th
Aiolikos	Mytilene	Group 3, 4th
Doxa Megalopolis	Megalopolis	Arcadia FCA champion, FCA Winners' Championship Group 13 runner-up

=== Standings ===
Pos	Team	Pld	W	D	L	GF	GA	GD	Pts	Promotion or relegation
1	Panachaiki (C, P)	28	20	5	3	47	9	+38	65	Promotion to Football League
2	Chalkida	28	14	10	4	34	22	+12	52	
3	PAO Varda	28	14	6	8	39	26	+13	48	
4	Enosi Ermionida	28	11	10	7	40	31	+9	43	
5	Asteras Amaliada	28	10	8	10	25	30	−5	38	
6	Thiva	28	9	10	9	32	29	+3	37	
7	Fostiras	28	9	9	10	25	20	+5	36	
8	Panarkadikos	28	9	9	10	21	24	−3	36	
9	Aiolikos	28	8	11	9	32	25	+7	35	
10	Panargiakos	28	11	2	15	24	35	−11	35	
11	A.O.Loutraki	28	10	4	14	22	35	−13	34	
12	Achaiki	28	10	6	12	26	32	−6	33 (Note: Achaiki deducted three points for this season by Hellenic Football Federation.)	
13	Tsiklitiras Pylos	28	7	9	12	22	26	−4	30	
14	Zevgolateio	28	6	8	14	15	37	−22	26	
15	Doxa Megalopolis (R)	28	6	7	15	24	47	−23	25	Relegation to FCA championships

Source: Hellenic Football Federation (in Greek)
Rules for classification: 1st points; 2nd head-to-head points; 3rd head-to-head goal difference
(C) Champions; (P) Promoted; (R) Relegated

== Group 4 ==
=== Teams ===
Location of teams in Group 4 of 2015–16 Gamma Ethniki

Team	Location	Last season
AEEK INKA	Chania	Chania FCA champion, FCA Winners' Championship Group 14 runner-up
Agios Ierotheos	Peristeri	Athens FCA champion, FCA Winners' Championship Group 9 runner-up
Thyella Rafina	Rafina(Diastavrosi neighborhood)	East Attica FCA champion, FCA Winners' Championship Group 11 winner
Ermis Zoniana	Zoniana	Group 4, 6th
Panthiraikos	Santorini	Cyclades FCA champion, FCA Winners' Championship Group 10 runner-up
Proodeftiki	Nikaia	Piraeus FCA champion, FCA Winners' Championship Group 9 winner
Atsalenios	Heraklion(Atsalenio neighborhood)	Heraklion FCA champion, FCA Winners' Championship Group 14 winner
Ilisiakos	Zografou	Group 4, 8th
A.E. Kifisia	Kifisia	Group 4, 9th
Triglia Rafina	Rafina	Group 4, 3rd
Ergotelis	Heraklion	Football League, 18th
Rodos	Rhodes	Dodecanese FCA champion, FCA Winners' Championship Group 10 winner
Ethnikos Piraeus	Piraeus	Group 4, 4th
Ionikos	Nikaia	Group 4, 7th
Ialysos	Ialysos	Group 4, 5th

=== Standings ===
Pos	Team	Pld	W	D	L	GF	GA	GD	Pts	Promotion or relegation
1	Ergotelis (C, P)	28	19	7	2	50	21	+29	64	Promotion to Football League
2	Ionikos	28	19	6	3	55	18	+37	63	
3	Agios Ierotheos	28	15	9	4	40	23	+17	54	
4	Ethnikos Piraeus	28	11	7	10	34	33	+1	40	
5	Atsalenios	28	12	4	12	37	43	−6	40	
6	Proodeftiki	28	10	9	9	31	27	+4	39	
7	Ermis Zoniana	28	9	7	12	25	33	−8	34	
8	Triglia Rafina	28	8	8	12	35	42	−7	32	
9	Panthiraikos	28	7	11	10	28	32	−4	32	
10	Rodos	28	8	7	13	29	41	−12	31	
11	A.E. Kifisia	28	7	9	12	30	36	−6	30	
12	Thyella Rafina	28	6	11	11	29	36	−7	29	
13	Ialysos	28	7	8	13	29	41	−12	29	
14	Ilisiakos	28	6	9	13	24	35	−11	27	
15	AEEK INKA (R)	28	7	6	15	25	39	−14	27	Relegation to FCA championships

Source: Hellenic Football Federation (in Greek)
Rules for classification: 1st points; 2nd head-to-head points; 3rd head-to-head goal difference
(C) Champions; (P) Promoted; (R) Relegated
