= Christos Batzios (footballer) =

Greek footballer (born 1991)

Personal information
- Date of birth: 15 October 1991 (age 35)
- Place of birth: Kavala, Greece
- Height: 1.89 m (6 ft 2 in)
- Position: Centre-back

Youth career
- –2007: Elpides Kavala
- 2007–2009: Aris Zygos

Senior career*
Years	Team	Apps	(Gls)
2009–2011	Ethnikos Alexandroupoli	22	(1)
2011–2012	Nea Chili		
2012–2014	Evros Soufli	36	(2)
2014–2017	Kavala	64	(2)
2017–2021	Ergotelis	117	(3)
2021–2022	Xanthi	22	(0)
2022–2025	Chania	73	(0)
- * Club domestic league appearances and goals as of 1 July 2025

Christos Batzios (Greek: Χρήστος Μπάτζιος, born 15 October 1991) is a Greek professional footballer who plays as a centre-back.

== Career ==
Born in Kavala, Batzios began his football career at the infrastructure segments of local club, Elpides Kavala, at the age of 7. At the age of 16, he signed up with fellow local club Aris Zygos, where he stayed until he graduated from high school. Having been accepted in the Department of Primary Education at the Democritus University of Thrace, Batzios combined his studies with amateur football, playing for Alexandroupoli-based clubs Ethnikos and Nea Chili, as well as neighboring club Evros Soufli. After graduating, Batzios returned to his hometown and signed a contract with Kavala in the summer of 2014. He, and teammate Alexandros Bracjani refused to sign a new contract with the club during the winter transfer window of the 2016–17 Gamma Ethniki season and subsequently signed with Cretan Gamma Ethniki club Ergotelis in January 2017.

After winning the Division title with Ergotelis at the end of the season, Batzios was one of just five players remaining with the club's roster during an uncertain transitional period, wherein the club was taken over by a new administration. Then the oldest member of the club at age 25, he was appointed team captain by his teammates, a position he kept during his years with the team. He is currently In the 10th place in the history of Ergotelis in terms of appearances, after having reached 128 appearances.

For the season of 2021–2022, Batzios was transferred to Xanthi FC, where he remained until the end of the season. His latest transfer was to the Cretan team Chania FC in August 2022, where he currently plays.

== Career statistics ==
As of matches played 19 May 2021

Appearances and goals by club, season and competition
Club	Season	League			Cup		Continental		Other		Total	
Club	Season	Division	Apps	Goals	Apps	Goals	Apps	Goals	Apps	Goals	Apps	Goals
Ergotelis	2016–17	Gamma Ethniki	16	1	0	0	—		0 (Note: Appearance in the Gamma Ethniki Cup)	0	16	1
Ergotelis	2017–18	Football League	29	0	2	0	—		—		31	0
Ergotelis	2018–19	Football League	28	2	8	0	—		—		36	2
Ergotelis	2019–20	Superleague 2	18	0	1	0	—		—		19	0
Ergotelis	2020–21	Superleague 2	26	0	—		—		—		26	0
Ergotelis	Total		117	3	11	0	—		0	0	128	3
Career total			117	3	11	0	—		0	0	128	3
