= Nikolaos Katsikokeris =

Greek footballer (born 1988)

Nikos Katsikokeris
Personal information
- Full name: Nikolaos Katsikokeris
- Date of birth: 19 June 1988 (age 38)
- Place of birth: Amfilochia, Greece
- Height: 1.82 m (5 ft 11 1/2 in)
- Position: Forward

Team information
- Current team: Giouchtas

Senior career*
Years	Team	Apps	(Gls)
2005–2007	Panetolikos	11	(1)
2007–2008	Tilikratis	30	(18)
2008–2009	Keratsini	30	(26)
2009–2011	Platanias	58	(19)
2011–2012	Ergotelis	27	(7)
2012–2013	AEK Athens	9	(0)
2013–2014	Panthrakikos	4	(0)
2014–2015	Panegialios	12	(1)
2015	Panargiakos	12	(4)
2015–2016	Ermis Zoniana	28	(17)
2016–2017	Ergotelis	27	(18)
2017–2018	Ethnikos Piraeus	24	(10)
2018–2019	Episkopi	0	(0)
2019–2020	Ierapetra	21	(3)
2020–	Giouchtas		
- * Club domestic league appearances and goals as of 18 July 2020

Nikos Katsikokeris (Greek: Νίκος Κατσικοκέρης, born 19 June 1988) is a Greek professional footballer who plays as a forward for Gamma Ethniki club Giouchtas.

== Club career ==
Katsikokeris began his professional career with Panetolikos at the age of 17. He then played for Tilikratis and Keratsini in the Delta Ethniki, the fourth tier of the Greek football league system. In 2009, he went to Platanias, a Cretan club playing in the Greek Football League 2, where he scored 19 goals in 58 games. His good performances did not go unnoticed, and in the summer of 2011, Katsikokeris signed for Ergotelis, a fellow Cretan club playing in the Greek Super League. Katsikokeris impressed with his performances with Ergotelis, coming straight from the third division to score 7 goals in 27 Super League games, thus drawing the attention of struggling Greek giants AEK Athens, who bought Katsikokeris from Ergotelis in the summer of 2012 for a reported 150K euros. On 16 September 2012, he made his debut for AEK Athens against Skoda Xanthi.

After AEK Athens were relegated at the end of the season, Katsikokeris signed at Panthrakikos on 14 August 2013. As he was not considered between his manager's primary choices, Katsikokeris left the club in 2014, and has since returned to Crete and the Gamma Ethniki, after a brief stay with Panegialios in the Football League.

After a distinguished performance with Cretan club Ermis Zoniana in the 2015–16 Gamma Ethniki season, in which he scored 16 goals in 25 matches, Katsikokeris returned to Ergotelis once again in the summer of 2016, this time determined to help his former club return to top flight after being relegated to the Gamma Ethniki. He did so by scoring 18 goals in 27 matches during the 2016−17 Gamma Ethniki season, finishing top-scorer of Group 4 for the second time in his career since his feats with Platanias in 2011. His stay at the club was abruptly ended due to uncertainty on whether the club would secure the required funds to actually promote to the Football League after securing the Division title, and therefore Katsikokeris chose to continue his career with Gamma Ethniki side Ethnikos Piraeus. He finished third top-scorer in the Group 6 Table with 7 goals in 18 matches, contributing to Ethnikos' first-place finish and subsequent qualification to the promotion play-offs. Katsikokeris scored an additional three goals in six games during the play-offs, but Ethnikos failed to promote to the Football League.

In July 2018, Katsikokeris moved back to Crete and signed a contract with newly promoted Gamma Ethniki club Episkopi. After Episkopi, joined for two seasons club Ierapetra. In 2022 he signed for Gamma Ethniki club, Giouchtas.
