= Manolis Papamattheakis =

Greek football manager

Personal information
- Full name: Emmanouil Papamattheakis
- Date of birth: 9 April 1972 (age 54)
- Place of birth: Heraklion, Crete, Greece

Team information
- Current team: Panthiraikos (manager)

Managerial career
- Years: Team
- 2006: OF Ierapetra
- 2008–2009: Olympiakos Chersonissos
- 2010: Olympiakos Chersonissos
- 2014: Ermis Zoniana
- 2014–2015: PAO Krousonas
- 2015–2016: Ermis Zoniana
- 2016–2017: Panthiraikos
- 2017–2018: Irodotos
- 2018–2019: Karaiskakis
- 2019: Giouchtas
- 2020–2021: OF Ierapetra
- 2021: Aiolikos
- 2021–2022: GPS Almyros Gaziou
- 2023: Episkopi
- 2024–2025: Irodotos
- 2025–: Panthiraikos

Manolis Papamattheakis (Greek: Μανώλης Παπαματθαιάκης; born 9 April 1972) is a Greek football manager.
