= Alkis Dimitris =

Greek footballer (born 1980)

Personal information
- Date of birth: 23 July 1980 (age 46)
- Place of birth: Sarandë, Albania
- Height: 1.83 m (6 ft 0 in)
- Position: Defender

Team information
- Current team: Doxa Pachiana (manager)

Senior career*
Years	Team	Apps	(Gls)
2001–2005	Ergotelis	83	(5)
2005–2006	Veria	28	(0)
2006–2007	AEP Paphos	10	(0)
2007–2009	Kallithea	72	(1)
2009–2011	Ilioupoli	49	(1)
2011–2012	Fokikos	9	(0)
2012–2016	Platanias	70	(1)
2016–2017	Ergotelis	9	(1)
2017–2018	AEEK INKA	15	(0)
Total		345	(9)

Managerial career
- 2018–: Doxa Pachiana
- * Club domestic league appearances and goals

Alkis Dimitris (Greek: Άλκης Δημήτρης; born 23 July 1980) is a Greek football manager and former professional player who played as a defender. He has spent the majority of his career representing Cretan clubs in various leagues of the Greek football league system, including the Super League Greece.

== Playing career ==
Born in Sarandë, Dimitris' family moved to Heraklion, Crete where he began playing football with Ergotelis in the Delta Ethniki. He was instrumental in helping Ergotelis earn consecutive promotions, which eventually brought the club in the Super League Greece in 2004. During this period, Dimitris made a total of 83 appearances and scored 5 goals for the Cretan club. He then went on to play for one season with Veria in the 2005–06 Beta Ethniki, followed by a six-month move to Cypriot club AEP Paphos. Afterwards, Dimitris returned to Greece and went on to play for 2nd division clubs Kallithea, Ilioupoli and Fokikos, before returning to Crete and signing with Football League side Platanias. He spent six months with Platanias in the Football League, and an additional four years in the Super League, after the club achieved promotion to the latter during the 2011–12 Football League season. On 19 June 2016, the 35-year old defender returned to Ergotelis. He was released from his contract in January 2017, and subsequently joined another Cretan club competing in the Gamma Ethniki, AEEK INKA. He followed the club in their relegation to the Chania Football Clubs Association A Division championship, where he retired his playing career in the summer of 2018, having won the local championship.

== Managerial career ==
After retiring, Dimitris was offered the head coach position of Chania FCA A Division club Doxa Pachiana.
