= Manolis Nikolakakis =

Greek footballer

Personal information
- Full name: Emmanouil Nikolakakis
- Date of birth: 19 February 1991 (age 35)
- Place of birth: Athens, Greece
- Height: 1.77 m (5 ft 9 1/2 in)
- Position: Right back

Team information
- Current team: Aspropyrgos
- Number: 13

Youth career
- 2010–2011: Levadiakos

Senior career*
Years	Team	Apps	(Gls)
2011–2015	Levadiakos	29	(0)
2015	Episkopi	16	(0)
2015–2016	AEL	12	(0)
2016–2017	Trikala	0	(0)
2017	Ergotelis	14	(1)
2017−2018	Akropolis IF	13	(0)
2018	Ergotelis	21	(0)
2018−2019	Kallithea	0	(0)
2019	Olympiacos Volos	0	(0)
2019−	Aspropyrgos	21	(0)
- * Club domestic league appearances and goals as of 12 August 2020

Manolis Nikolakakis (Greek: Μανώλης Νικολακάκης, born 19 February 1991) is a Greek professional footballer who plays as a right back for Football League club Aspropyrgos.

== Career ==
Nikolakakis started playing in the youth team of Levadiakos in 2010. He signed a professional contract with the club in January 2011 and was promoted to the men's team. After a six-month spell at Cretan side Episkopi, Nikolakakis moved to AEL on 24 July 2015, signing a 3-year contract with the club. He was released by the club in the summer of 2016 and joined Football League side Trikala. Not gaining substantial playing time with Trikala, Nikolakakis terminated his contract with the club by mutual consent and moved back to Crete, this time joining Gamma Ethniki title contenders Ergotelis in January 2017. He won the Gamma Ethniki Group 4 title with Ergotelis, scoring the first goal in his pro career during a 1−2 away victory over fellow Cretan club AEEK INKA. Following an uncertain period in which the club was speculated to not be able to participate in the Football League due to the departure of its investors, Nikolakakis signed a contract with Swedish Division 1 side Akropolis IF. He spent the first half of the 2017−18 season in Stockholm before returning to Ergotelis in January 2018 to play in the Football League.

== Career statistics ==
As of matches played 25 May 2018

Club	Season	League			Cup		Other		Total	
Club	Season	Division	Apps	Goals	Apps	Goals	Apps	Goals	Apps	Goals
Levadiakos	2010–11	Football League	0	0	0	0	1 (Note: Football League Play-Offs)	0	1	0
Levadiakos	2011–12	Super League Greece	1	0	0	0	—		1	0
Levadiakos	2012–13	Super League Greece	8	0	4	0	—		12	0
Levadiakos	2013–14	Super League Greece	11	0	2	0	—		13	0
Levadiakos	2014–15	Super League Greece	9	0	3	0	—		12	0
Total			29	0	9	0	1	0	39	0
Episkopi	2014–15	Football League	9	0	0	0	7 (Note: Football League Play-Outs)	0	16	0
Total			9	0	0	0	7	0	16	0
AEL	2015–16	Football League	12	0	3	0	—		15	0
Total			12	0	3	0	—		15	0
Trikala	2016–17	Football League	0	0	2	0	—		2	0
Total			0	0	2	0	—		2	0
Ergotelis	2016–17	Gamma Ethniki	14	1	—		—		14	1
Total			14	1	0	0	—		14	1
Akropolis IF	2017	Division 1	11	0	0	0	2 (Note: Superettan Relegation Play-Offs)	0	13	0
Akropolis IF	2018	Division 1	0	0	1	0	—		1	0
Total			11	0	1	0	2	0	14	0
Ergotelis	2017–18	Football League	21	0	0	0	—		21	0
Total			21	0	0	0	—		21	0
Kallithea	2018–19	Gamma Ethniki	0	0	—		—		0	0
Total			0	0	0	0	—		0	0
Career total			96	1	15	0	10	0	121	1

== Honours ==
AEL

- Football League: 2015–16

Ergotelis

- Gamma Ethniki: 2016−17
