= Soulis Papadopoulos =

Greek manager and former footballer

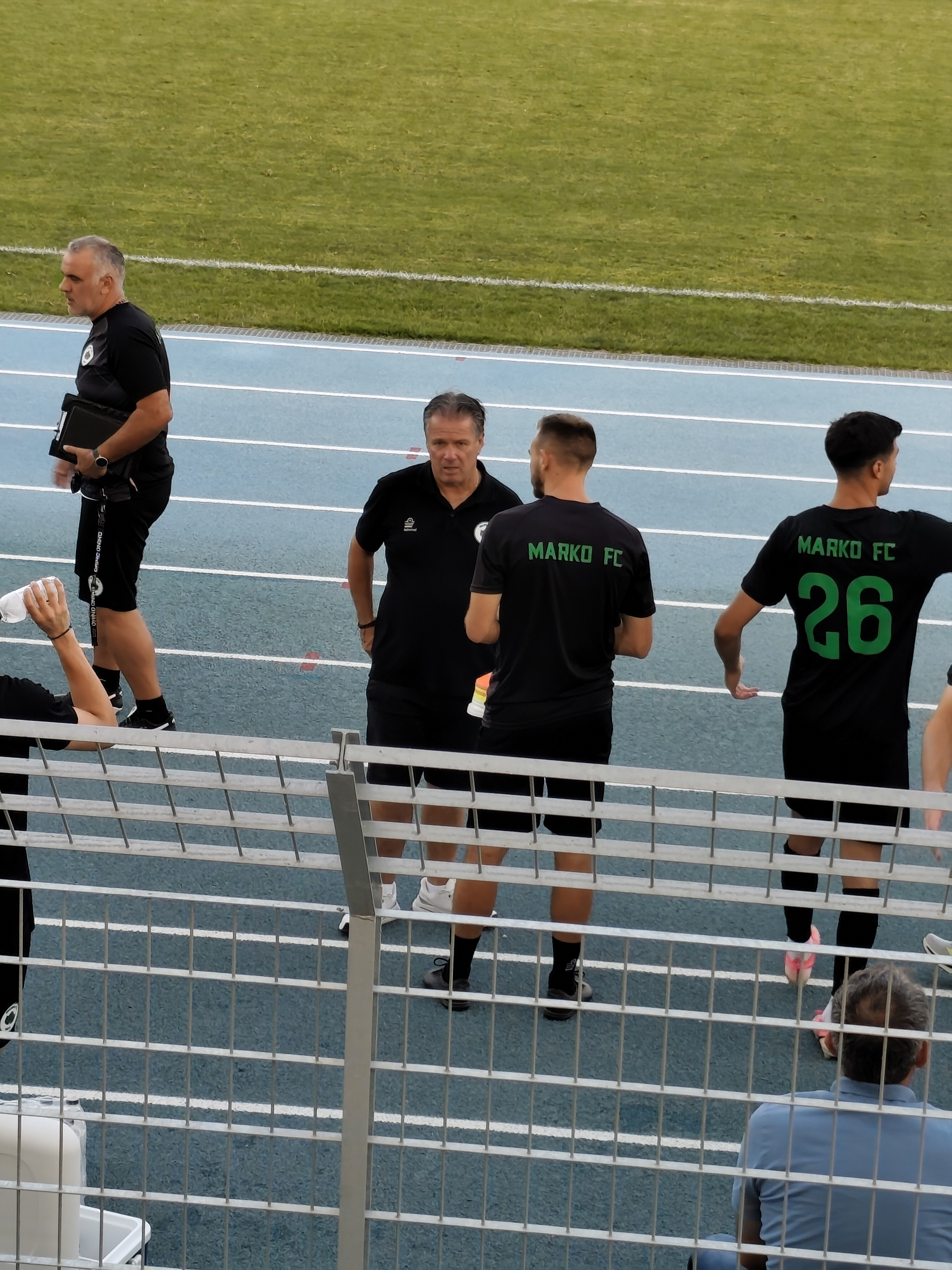
- Soulis Papadopoulos (pictured in the middle), taken during the Marko 1927 F.C. friendly match vs AO Karystos F.C. on 13/08/2026

Personal information
- Full name: Anastasios Papadopoulos
- Date of birth: 19 July 1967 (age 59)
- Place of birth: Nikaia, Attica, Greece
- Height: 1.70 m (5 ft 7 in)
- Position: Midfielder

Team information
- Current team: Marko (manager)

Youth career
- –1987: Proodeftiki

Senior career*
Years	Team	Apps	(Gls)
1987–1995	Proodeftiki		
1995–1996	Atromitos		
1996–1997	Doxa Vyronas		
1997–1999	Proodeftiki		

Managerial career
- 2000–2004: Proodeftiki
- 2004: Apollon Limassol
- 2005: Paniliakos
- 2005–2007: Proodeftiki
- 2007: Vyzas Megara
- 2007–2008: Olympiacos Volos
- 2008–2009: Pierikos
- 2009: Egaleo
- 2009–2010: Pierikos
- 2010: Diagoras
- 2010–2011: Veria
- 2011–2012: Pierikos
- 2012: Iraklis
- 2012: Pierikos
- 2012: Doxa Drama
- 2012–2013: Olympiacos Volos
- 2013: Aris
- 2013–2014: Aris
- 2014: Chania
- 2015: Chania
- 2015: AEL
- 2015: Lamia
- 2015: Olympiacos Volos
- 2017: Ergotelis
- 2017–2018: Asteras Amaliada
- 2018: Aittitos Spata
- 2019: Diagoras
- 2019–2020: Olympiacos Volos
- 2021: Trikala
- 2021–2023: Panachaiki
- 2023–2024: Ilioupoli
- 2024: Iraklis
- 2024: Panachaiki
- 2025–: Marko
- * Club domestic league appearances and goals

Soulis Papadopoulos (Greek: Σούλης Παπαδόπουλος; born 19 July 1967) is a Greek professional football manager and former player. He is the current manager of Super League 2 club Marko.

== Playing career ==
Papadopoulos began his football career at the infrastructure segments of his local Proodeftiki and was promoted to the first team in 1987. He spent the majority of his career in Proodeftiki, with brief tenures at Atromitos and Doxa Vyronas towards the end of his playing career. Papadopoulos retired in 1999, last playing for Proodeftiki in the Alpha Ethniki.

== Managerial career ==
Several months after his retirement, Papadopoulos began his coaching career as an assistant manager at Proodeftiki in the Alpha Ethniki. He took on as interim manager during coaching staff replacements and eventually, was appointed head coach of the club in 2000. Despite the club's relegation at the end of the 1999–2000 Alpha Ethniki season, Papadopoulos was entrusted to lead the team back to top-flight, which he managed after managing the club for two seasons in the Beta Ethniki. He would remain manager of Proodeftiki for the following two seasons in the Alpha Ethniki until the end of the 2003–04 Alpha Ethniki season, when he resigned from his post after a loss from Panionios, thus failing to avoid relegation to the Beta Ethniki.

Papadopoulos moved to Cyprus and was appointed head coach of Cypriot First Division side Apollon Limassol. His stay however was brief, as he resigned from his post in September 2004 after a 6–1 loss from Alki Larnaca. He returned to Greece to take over Kastoria in the Beta Ethniki, but terminated his contract in just two days, for personal reasons. Early in 2005, Papadopoulos took over as manager of Paniliakos, also in the Beta Ethniki before returning to Proodeftiki in the summer of 2005, managing the club for two seasons in the Beta Ethniki. At the end of the 2006-07 Beta Ethniki season, Proodeftiki finished in 16th place, thus being relegated to the Gamma Ethniki (the third tier of the Greek football league system) and Papadopoulos' contract with the club was terminated.

Papadopoulos moved to Vyzas Megara in 2007, and then Olympiacos Volos until March 2008. A month later, he was hired by Pierikos, where he managed to avoid relegation at the end of the season. He thus renewed his stay at Pierikos until April 2009.

In September 2009, Papadopoulos took over management of Egaleo, resigning after managing no win in three consecutive matches. He returned to Pierikos in October 2009, where he managed to enter the promotion play-offs. After Pierikos failed to promote to the Super League in the process, Papadopoulos' contract was terminated.

At the start of the 2010–11 season, he moved to Rhodes to take over local club Diagoras. He resigned after three games, and was appointed head coach by fellow Football League side Veria until January 2011. In March, he once again returned to Pierikos. He left the club in January 2012, and was appointed as the manager of Iraklis in the Football League 2 Northern Group. In May 2012 he was hired a fourth time by Pierikos until the end of the season. In the summer of 2012, he moved to Doxa Drama.

At the start of the 2012–13 season, in October 2012 and after consecutive bad results during the championship, Papadopoulos resigned as coach of Doxa Drama and was subsequently hired again by Olympiacos Volos, where he stayed until January 2013. Papadopoulos then returned to the Super League to take over management of former league powerhouse Aris in March 2013. Given the club's financial situation and struggling nature, Papadopoulos successfully managed to stay clear of relegation at the end the season, but terminated his contract in June, only to be re-appointed in December that same year to replace Zoran Milinković. His second tenure with Aris was less successful however, and after a loss against Ergotelis in March 2014, which solidified Aris' relegation to the Football League, Papadopoulos resigned.

In July 2014, he took over management of Cretan club Chania in the Football League but was replaced in October that same year. He was re-appointed in January 2015 and stayed in Chania for one more month. In March, he moved to AEL until the end of the season.

In August 2015, Papadopoulos was hired by Lamia, departing after a loss against his former club AEL during the opening match of the 2015–16 Football League season. In October 2015 Papadopoulos returned for a third time in his career to Olympiacos Volos, departing in December.

After a one-year break, Papadopoulos was hired by former Super League club Ergotelis in the Gamma Ethniki in January 2017. Although considered a title contender, Ergotelis trailed 7 points behind Ionikos when Papadopoulos took over. Nevertheless, Papadopoulos achieved a remarkable unbeaten record (12 wins, 3 draws) to narrowly finish on top of the 2016–17 Gamma Ethniki Group 4 Table, achieving promotion to the Football League. His stay was not renewed for the next season however, due to the departure of former club president Georgios Vrentzos, and an eventual change in club leadership.

In December 2017, Papadopoulos was hired by Gamma Ethniki side Asteras Amaliada, with whom he won his second Gamma Ethniki title in a row, leading the club to the top of the Group 5 Table and the Football League promotion play-offs. However, he was fired after a 3–0 away loss to Irodotos in the opening match of the play-offs.

== Honours ==
=== Manager ===
==== Marko ====
- Gamma Ethniki: 2024–25

==== Ergotelis ====
- Gamma Ethniki: 2016–17

==== Asteras Amaliadas ====
- Gamma Ethniki: 2017–18
