= Local football championships of Greece =

Regional men's association football leagues in Greece

The Football Clubs Associations Championships (Greek: Πρωταθλήματα Ενώσεων Ποδοσφαιρικών Σωματείων) are the lowest men's association football leagues of the Greek football league system. The participants are only amateur clubs from various Greek cities or villages. Every Football Clubs Association (Greek: Ένωση Ποδοσφαιρικών Σωματείων) organises its own championship. At the end of each Football Clubs Association Championship, the champion club plays knock-out matches against other Football Clubs Associations Championships champion clubs, participating in the F.C.A. Champion Teams Championship, as a means of determining which clubs will promote to the Gamma Ethniki. Every Football Clubs Association also organises its own cup. And at the end of each Football Clubs Association Cup, the cup winner had the right to participate in the Greek Cup until the 2024–25 season. From the 2025–26 season, the cup winners participate in the Greek Amateurs Cup.

== Football Clubs Associations ==
=== Current Football Clubs Associations ===
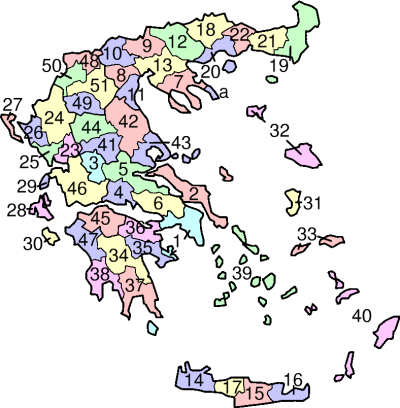
The prefectures of Greece

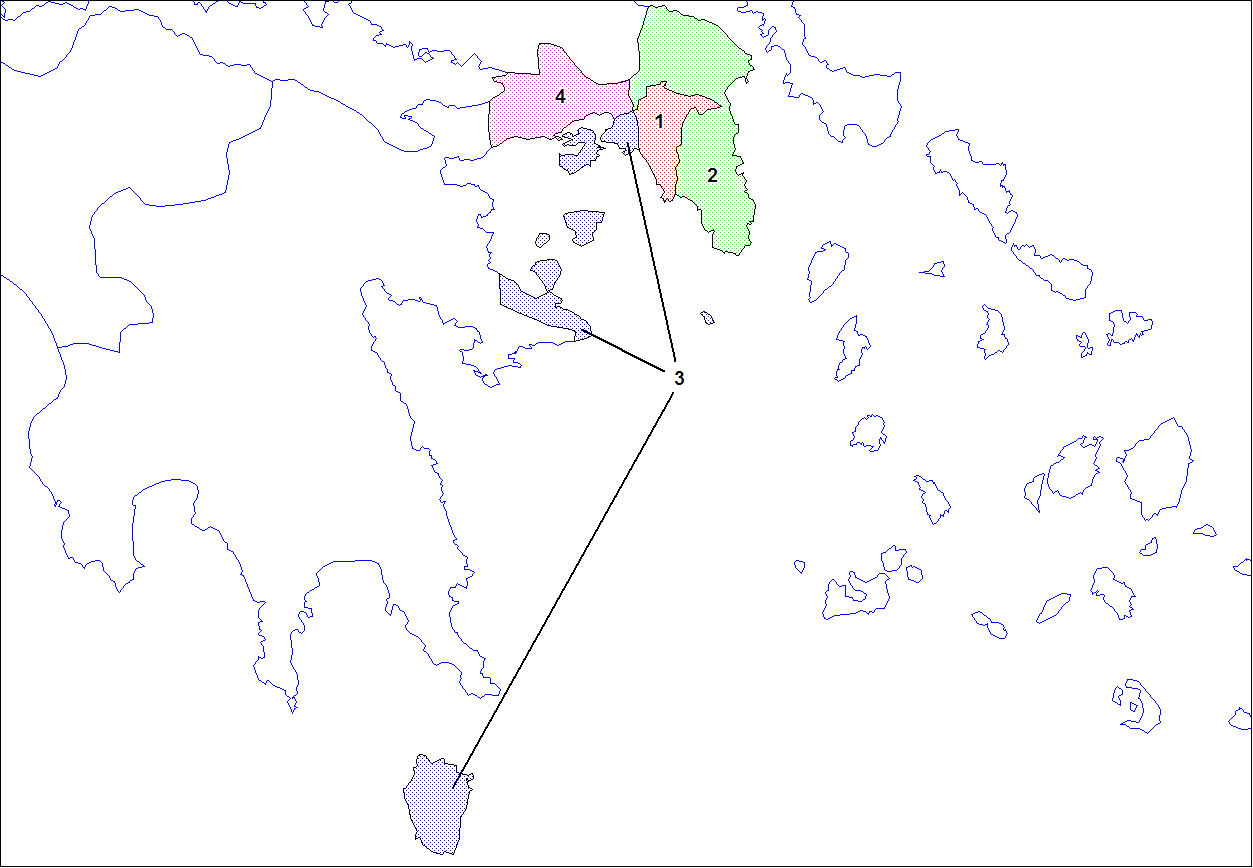
The prefectures of Attica (labelled 1 in the map above): 1 Athens, 2 East Attica, 3 Piraeus, 4 West Attica.

Football Clubs Association	Headquarters	Year established
Achaea	Patras	1927
Aetolia–Acarnania	Missolonghi	1968
Arcadia	Tripoli	1953
Argolida	Nafplio	1964
Arta	Arta	1981
Athens	Athens	1924
Boeotia	Livadeia	1973
Chalkidiki	Polygyros	1968
Chania	Chania	1950
Chios	Chios	1939
Corfu	Corfu	1952
Corinthia	Corinth	1946
Cyclades	Ermoupoli	1980
Dodecanese	Rhodes	1947
Drama	Drama	1963
East Attica	Pallini	2000
Elis	Pyrgos	1969
Epirus	Ioannina	1952
Euboea	Chalcis	1928
Evros	Alexandroupolis	1969
Evrytania	Karpenisi	1990
Florina	Florina	1979
Grevena	Grevena	1982
Heraklion	Heraklion	1929
Imathia	Veria	1954
Karditsa	Karditsa	1968
Kastoria	Kastoria	1977
Kavala	Kavala	1930
Kefalonia–Ithaca	Argostoli	1980
Kilkis	Kilkis	1960
Kozani	Kozani	1957
Laconia	Sparta	1952
Larissa	Larissa	1960
Lasithi	Agios Nikolaos	1982
Lesvos	Mytilene	1948
Macedonia	Thessaloniki	1924
Messinia	Kalamata	1929
Pella	Edessa	1971
Phocis	Amfissa	1984
Phthiotis	Lamia	1951
Pieria	Nea Efesos	1980
Piraeus	Piraeus	1925
Preveza–Lefkada	Preveza	1981
Rethymno	Rethymno	1946
Samos	Samos	1951
Serres	Serres	1955
Thesprotia	Igoumenitsa	1984
Thessaly	Volos	1929
Thrace	Komotini	1928
Trikala	Trikala	1973
West Attica	Elefsina	2003
Xanthi	Xanthi	1978
Zakynthos	Zakynthos	1987

=== Defunct Football Clubs Associations ===
Football Clubs Association	Headquarters	Operating period
Greece	Athens	1919–1924
Smyrna	Smyrna	1898–1922

== See also ==
- Greek football league system
