= Alexandros Bracjani =

Albanian footballer

Personal information
- Full name: Alexandros Bracjani
- Date of birth: 6 July 1992 (age 34)
- Place of birth: Albania
- Height: 1.84 m (6 ft 1/2 in)
- Position: Forward

Team information
- Current team: Makedonikos
- Number: 11

Youth career
- 2007–2008: Iraklis Kavala
- 2008–2011: Kavala

Senior career*
Years	Team	Apps	(Gls)
2011–2013	Kavala	33	(0)
2011–2012	→ AO Chania (loan)	17	(3)
2013–2014	Vyzantio Kokkinochoma	11	(0)
2014	Episkopi	10	(2)
2014–2017	Kavala		
2017	Ergotelis	6	(0)
2017–2018	PAEEK	24	(9)
2018–2019	ASIL	25	(3)
2020	PAEEK	9	(4)
2020–2021	Digenis Akritas Morphou	15	(0)
2021–	Makedonikos	21	(2)
- * Club domestic league appearances and goals as of 16 June 2023

Alexandros Bracjani (born 6 July 1992) is an Albanian professional footballer who plays as a forward for Greek Super League 2 club Makedonikos. He also holds a Greek passport.

== Club career ==
Bracjani started his career with local Kavala amateur outfit Iraklis Kavala, before being acquired by the city's more prestigious AO Kavala, where he featured in the Super League U20 League, finishing as top-scorer for the club's U−20 squad. He was promoted to the men's squad in January 2011, signing his first professional contract with club, but received no caps in the Super League. He was thus loaned out to Cretan club AO Chania, playing in the Gamma Ethniki during the winter transfer window of the 2011–2012 season, where he had 17 caps and scored 3 goals. Bracjani also received Greek citizenship during his time with Chania. He returned to Kavala in the summer of 2012, featuring in a total 33 matches (28 for the Greek Football League and 5 for the Greek Football Cup) but scoring no goals. During the summer of 2013, Bracjani moved to another Gamma Ethniki outfit, Vyzantio Kokkinochoma for six months, finishing the 2013–2014 season with Football League side Episkopi.

Bracjani returned to his former club Kavala and the Gamma Ethniki in 2014, after a brief spell with Episkopi in the Football League. He, and teammate Christos Batzios refused to sign a new contract with the club during the winter transfer window of the 2016–17 Gamma Ethniki season and subsequently signed with Cretan club Ergotelis in January 2017. He won the Gamma Ethniki Group 4 championship with Ergotelis, and was subsequently waived in July.

In August 2017, Bracjani signed with Cypriot Second Division club PAEEK.

== Honours ==
Ergotelis

- Gamma Ethniki: 2016–17
