= Arta Football Clubs Association =

Association football governing body in Arta Prefecture, Greece

- Full name: Arta Football Clubs Association; Greek: Ένωση Ποδοσφαιρικών Σωματείων Άρτας
- Short name: Arta F.C.A.; Greek: Ε.Π.Σ. Άρτας
- Founded: 1981; 45 years ago
- Headquarters: Arta, Greece
- FIFA affiliation: Hellenic Football Federation
- President: Athanasios Trompoukis
- Website: www.epsartas.gr

Arta Football Clubs Association (Greek: Ένωση Ποδοσφαιρικών Σωματείων Άρτας) is an association football governing body, representing teams from Arta Prefecture and part of Aetolia-Acarnania (Menidi). It is based in the city of Arta, and is a member of Hellenic Football Federation.

== History ==
Panamvrakikos, Aetos and Olympiakos joined the Epirus Football Clubs Association in 1952. They formed a league with the clubs from Ioannina. Later clubs from Arta also joined the EFCA. The clubs took part on Epirus championship for three decades. In 1981, they broke up from the Epirus Football Clubs Association, forming Arta Football Clubs Association.

== Organization ==
The association is a member of the Hellenic Football Federation and organizes a regional football league and cup.

== List of champions ==
Season	Club
1981–82	Achilleas Neochori
1982–83	AO Arta
1983–84	Proodeftiki Grammenitsa
1984–85	Aias Rachi
1985–86	Proodeftiki Grammenitsa
1986–87	Amvrakia Kostakioi
1987–88	Doxa Arta
1988–89	Niki Kalamia
1989–90	Melissa Arta
1990–91	Proodeftiki Grammenitsa
1991–92	Panagrotikos Agios Spyridonas
1992–93	Proodeftiki Grammenitsa
1993–94	Melissa Arta
1994–95	Filellines Peta
1995–96	Melissa Arta
1996–97	Skoufas Kompoti
1997–98	Melissa Arta
1998–99	Skoufas Kompoti
1999–00	Anagennisi Arta
2000–01	Skoufas Kompoti
2001–02	Anagennisi Arta
2002–03	AO Kiratsa Agios Dimitrios
2003–04	Arachthos Pachikalamos
2004–05	Aetos Diasello
2005–06	Arachthos Pachikalamos
2006–07	Skoufas Kompoti
2007–08	Arachthos Pachikalamos
2008–09	Asteras Rokka
2009–10	AO Filothei
2010–11	Omonoia Petra
2011–12	Aetos Diasello
2012–13	Skoufas Kompoti
2013–14	Anagennisi Arta
2014–15	Skoufas Kompoti
2015–16	Amvrakia Kostakioi
2016–17	Skoufas Kompoti
2017–18	AO Floriada
2018–19	Anagennisi Arta
2019–20	Skoufas Kompoti
2020–21	Abandoned
2021–22	AE Xirovouni
2022–23	Anagennisi Arta
2023–24	PAS Aneza
2024–25	Proodos Rogon
2025–26	PAS Aneza

=== Performance by club ===
Club	Titles	Season
Skoufas Kompoti	8	1997, 1999, 2001, 2007, 2013, 2015, 2017, 2020
Anagennisi Arta	5	2000, 2002, 2014, 2019, 2023
Proodeftiki Grammenitsa	4	1984, 1986, 1991, 1993
Melissa Arta	4	1990, 1994, 1996, 1998
Arachthos Pachikalamos	3	2004, 2006, 2008
Aetos Diasello	2	2005, 2012
Amvrakia Kostakioi	2	1987, 2016
PAS Aneza	2	2024, 2026
Achilleas Neochori	1	1982
AO Arta	1	1983
Aias Rachi	1	1985
Doxa Arta	1	1988
Niki Kalamia	1	1989
Panagrotikos Agios Spyridonas	1	1992
Filellines Peta	1	1995
AO Kiratsa Agios Dimitrios	1	2003
Asteras Rokka	1	2009
AO Filothei	1	2010
Omonoia Petra	1	2011
AO Floriada	1	2018
AE Xirovouni	1	2022
Proodos Rogon	1	2025

== Cup ==
The Arta FCA Cup is a football competition in which the clubs competing in any of the Arta FCA Football Leagues participate.

=== List of Cup Finals ===
Season	Club	Score	Club
1981–82	Melissa Arta	2–2 (4–2 pen)	Proodeftiki Grammenitsa
1982–83	AO Arta	1–0	Proodeftiki Grammenitsa
1983–84	Proodeftiki Grammenitsa	2–0	Atromitos Gavria
1984–85	Proodeftiki Grammenitsa	2–0	AO Arta
1985–86	Proodeftiki Grammenitsa	2–1	Melissa Arta
1986–87	Proodeftiki Grammenitsa	1–0	Amvrakia Kostakioi
1987–88	AO Arta	3–1	Amvrakia Kostakioi
1988–89	Asteras Rokka	2–1	Amvrakia Kostakioi
1989–90	Doxa Arta	4–0	Asteras Rokka
1990–91	Melissa Arta	2–1	Achilleas Neochori
1991–92	Melissa Arta	2–1	Achilleas Neochori
1992–93	Doxa Arta	3–2	Melissa Arta
1993–94	Anagennisi Arta	1–0	Filellines Peta
1994–95	Melissa Arta	3–0 (et)	Filellines Peta
1995–96	Melissa Arta	3–1	Proodeftiki Grammenitsa
1996–97	Amvrakia Kostakioi	3–0	AE Vigla
1997–98	Skoufas Kompoti	3–0	AO Filothei
1998–99	Anagennisi Arta	3–2	Skoufas Kompoti
1999–00	Skoufas Kompoti	3–1	Achilleas Neochori
2000–01	Skoufas Kompoti	3–0	AO Kiratsa Agios Dimitrios
2001–02	Anagennisi Arta	2–2 (4–3 pen)	Skoufas Kompoti
2002–03	Anagennisi Arta	1–0	AO Kiratsa Agios Dimitrios
2003–04	Anagennisi Arta	3–1	Arachthos Pachikalamos
2004–05	Arachthos Pachikalamos	3–1	Aetos Diasello
2005–06	Skoufas Kompoti	2–1 (et)	Aetos Diasello
2006–07	Skoufas Kompoti	3–0	Keravnos Megarchis
2007–08	Skoufas Kompoti	2–0	Doxa Arta
2008–09	Skoufas Kompoti	4–1	AO Filothei
2009–10	Anagennisi Arta	3–1	AO Agioi Anargyroi
2010–11	Omonoia Petra	1–0	AO Filothei
2011–12	AO Filothei	2–1	Skoufas Kompoti
2012–13	Anagennisi Arta	2–1	Skoufas Kompoti
2013–14	Doxa Arta	3–2	Anagennisi Arta
2014–15	Proodeftiki Grammenitsa	2–0	Doxa Arta
2015–16	AE Karaiskakis	1–0	Amvrakia Kostakioi
2016–17	Doxa Arta	0–3 (et)	Skoufas Kompoti
2017–18	Filellines Peta	1–1 (3–5 pen)	AE Xirovouni
2018–19	Skoufas Kompoti	1–2	Doxa Arta
2019–20	Anagennisi Arta	3–0	Apollon Glykorizo
2021–22	Anagennisi Arta	3–1	AE Xirovouni
2022–23	Anagennisi Arta	2-1 (et)	Doxa Arta
2023–24	Anagennisi Arta	3–0	PAS Aneza
2024–25	Anagennisi Arta	2–1	Proodos Rogon
2025–26	Anagennisi Arta	2–0	Filellines Peta

=== Performance by club ===
Club	Titles	Runner-up	Years (Titles)	Years (Runner-up)
Anagennisi Arta	13	1	1994, 1999, 2002, 2003, 2004, 2010, 2013, 2020, 2022, 2023, 2024, 2025, 2026	2014
Skoufas Kompoti	8	5	1998, 2000, 2001, 2006, 2007, 2008, 2009, 2017	1999, 2002, 2012, 2013, 2019
Proodeftiki Grammenitsa	5	3	1984, 1985, 1986, 1987, 2015	1982, 1983, 1996
Melissa Arta	5	2	1982, 1991, 1992, 1995, 1996	1986, 1993
Doxa Arta	4	4	1990, 1993, 2014, 2019	2008, 2015, 2017, 2023
AO Arta	2	1	1983, 1988	1985
Amvrakia Kostakioi	1	4	1997	1987, 1988, 1989, 2016
AO Filothei	1	3	2012	1998, 2009, 2011
Asteras Rokka	1	1	1989	1990
Arachthos Pachikalamos	1	1	2005	2004
AE Xirovouni	1	1	2018	2022
Omonoia Petra	1	–	2011	
AE Karaiskakis	1	–	2016	
Filellines Peta	–	4		1994, 1995, 2018, 2026
Achilleas Neochori	–	3		1991, 1992, 2000
AO Kiratsa Agios Dimitrios	–	2		2001, 2003
Aetos Diasello	–	2		2005, 2006
Atromitos Gavria	–	1		1984
AE Vigla	–	1		1997
Keravnos Megarchis	–	1		2007
AO Agioi Anargyroi	–	1		2010
Apollon Glykorizo	–	1		2020
PAS Aneza	–	1		2024
Proodos Rogon	–	1		2025

== Arta FCA clubs in National divisions ==
Club	First Division (Since 1959-60)	Second Division (Since 1962-63)	Third Division (Since 1965-66)	Fourth Division (Since 1982-83)	2023-24
Anagennisi Arta	0	10	25	12	Gamma Ethniki
AE Karaiskakis	0	5	4	1	-
Amvrakia Kostakioi	0	0	2	1	-
Skoufas Kompoti	0	0	1	5	Arta FCA A Division
Proodeftiki Grammenitsa	0	0	1	4	-
AO Floriada	0	0	1	0	-
Melissa Arta	0	0	0	7	Arta FCA A Division
Arachthos Pachikalamos	0	0	0	4	-
AO Filothei	0	0	0	3	Arta FCA A Division
Niki Kalamia	0	0	0	2	-
Asteras Rokka	0	0	0	2	Arta FCA B Division
Achilleas Neochori	0	0	0	1	-
AO Arta	0	0	0	1	-
Aias Rachi	0	0	0	1	Arta FCA A Division
Panagrotikos Agios Spyridonas	0	0	0	1	Arta FCA A Division
Filellines Peta	0	0	0	1	Arta FCA B Division
AO Kiratsa Agios Dimitrios	0	0	0	1	-
Aetos Diasello	0	0	0	1	-
Omonoia Petra	0	0	0	1	-
