= Micheel =

Brazilian footballer

Personal information
- Full name: Micheel Ângelo Quintanilha Pinheiro
- Date of birth: 26 November 1990 (age 35)
- Place of birth: Rio de Janeiro, Brazil
- Position: Midfielder

Senior career*
Years	Team	Apps	(Gls)
–2012	Duque de Caxias	5	(1)
2012–2013	São José EC	18	(1)
2013	Duque de Caxias	10	(0)
2014	Santa Rita	4	(0)
2014	ASA	9	(0)
2015	Campinense	3	(0)
2015–2016	Coruripe	22	(2)
2016	Boa EC	1	(0)
2016–2017	Ergotelis	25	(1)
2017–2018	Ethnikos Piraeus	13	(4)
2018–2019	Ialysos	0	(0)
2019	Perilima	0	(0)
2019	Ialysos	0	(0)
- * Club domestic league appearances and goals as of 10:52, 1 October 2015 (UTC)

Micheel Ângelo Quintanilha Pinheiro, simply known as Micheel (born 26 November 1990 in Rio de Janeiro, Brazil) is a Brazilian footballer, who plays as a midfielder.

== Honours ==
=== Club ===
Duque de Caxias

- Copa Rio: 2013

Campinense

- Campeonato Paraibano: 2015

Ergotelis

- Gamma Ethniki: 2017
