= Fotis Kaimakamoudis =

Greek footballer

Personal information
- Full name: Fotios Kaimakamoudis
- Date of birth: January 2, 1993 (age 33)
- Place of birth: Thessaloniki, Greece
- Height: 1.85 m (6 ft 1 in)
- Position: Forward

Youth career
- 2009−2011: Atromitos

Senior career*
Years	Team	Apps	(Gls)
2011−2014	Atromitos	0	(0)
2012	→ Ilisiakos (loan)	10	(3)
2012–2013	→ Glyfada (loan)	19	(7)
2013–2014	→ Mandraikos (loan)	22	(11)
2014–2015	Irodotos		
2015	Ionikos		
2015	Glyfada		
2015–2016	Fostiras		(5)
2016–2017	Ergotelis	25	(7)
2017–2018	A.E. Kifisia	10	(3)
2019–	Atsalenios	52	(24)

International career
2010−2012	Greece U-19	11	(2)
- * Club domestic league appearances and goals as of 2 May 2017

Fotis Kaimakamoudis (Greek: Φώτης Καϊμακαμούδης; born 2 January 1993) is a Greek professional footballer who plays as a forward for Gamma Ethniki club Atsalenios.

== Club career ==
Born in Thessaloniki, Kaimakamoudis began his football career with the infrastructure segments of Atromitos in Athens. During his spell with the U-20 outfit between 2009 and 2012, Kaimakamoudis amassed over 50 caps and scored a total of 28 goals. During the same time, he was called up for the national U-19 team, scoring twice in 11 games.

He was promoted to Atromitos' first team in 2011, but would not feature in any games during a six-month spell in the 2011−12 Super League season. Subsequently, Kaimakamoudis spent the next two-and-a-half seasons on loan in various Gamma Ethniki clubs, before being released by Atromitos to join Irodotos in the Gamma Ethniki in 2014. He then went on to play for Ionikos for six months before returning to Glyfada until the end of the 2014−15 season.

The next season, Kaimakamoudis signed for Gamma Ethniki title contenders Fostiras, narrowly missing out on promotion to the Football League by eventual Group winners OFI Crete. He then signed for Ergotelis, an ex-Super League club assembled to swiftly return to professional competitions. He contributed to Ergotelis' successful championship run with 7 goals in 25 matches, coming in mostly as a back-up striker. In July 2017, Kaimakamoudis signed with fellow Gamma Ethniki side A.E. Kifisia.
