= Paolo Farinola =

Brazilian-born Greek footballer

Personal information
- Full name: Paolo Farinola
- Date of birth: 22 February 1984 (age 42)
- Place of birth: Brasília, Brazil
- Height: 1.90 m (6 ft 3 in)
- Position: Winger

Team information
- Current team: Egaleo
- Number: 11

Senior career*
Years	Team	Apps	(Gls)
2001–2005	Skoda Xanthi	2	(0)
2005–2006	Acharnaikos	19	(3)
2006–2011	Ethnikos Piraeus	80	(13)
2011–2012	Veria	6	(0)
2012–2013	Kallithea	38	(7)
2013–2016	Apollon Smyrnis	72	(9)
2016–2017	A.E. Kifisia	0	(0)
2017–2018	Aittitos Spata	24	(8)
2018–2020	Egaleo	15	(1)
2020–2021	Nea Ionia		
- * Club domestic league appearances and goals

Paolo Farinola (born 22 February 1984) is a Brazilian-Greek professional footballer who plays as a winger for Football League club Egaleo.
