= Anastasios Rousakis =

Greek footballer

Personal information
- Full name: Anastasios Rousakis
- Date of birth: 21 July 1985 (age 41)
- Place of birth: Athens, Greece
- Height: 1.78 m (5 ft 10 in)
- Position: Midfielder

Youth career
- –2005: Ilioupoli

Senior career*
Years	Team	Apps	(Gls)
2005–2011	Ilioupoli	51	(0)
2011–2016	Kallithea	114	(10)
2016	Apollon Smyrnis	5	(0)
2016–2017	Ergotelis	23	(0)
2017–2019	Aittitos Spata		
2019–2020	Ilioupoli		
- * Club domestic league appearances and goals as of 28 June 2017

Anastasios Rousakis (Greek: Αναστάσιος Ρουσάκης; born 21 July 1985 in Greece) is a Greek former professional footballer, who played as a midfielder.
