= Manolis Stefanakos =

Greek footballer

Personal information
- Full name: Emmanouil Stefanakos
- Date of birth: 17 August 1989 (age 37)
- Place of birth: Athens, Greece
- Height: 2.00 m (6 ft 6 1/2 in)
- Position: Goalkeeper

Senior career*
Years	Team	Apps	(Gls)
2007–2008	Agioi Anargyroi		
2008–2010	Egaleo	38	(0)
2010–2012	Asteras Tripolis	2	(0)
2012–2016	Panetolikos	43	(0)
2016–2017	Ergotelis	12	(0)
2017–2018	Diagoras	18	(0)
2018–2019	Karaiskakis	17	(0)
2019–2020	Kalamata	16	(0)
2020–2021	Doxa Drama	23	(0)
2021–2022	Kyparissia		
- * Club domestic league appearances and goals as of 18 May 2021

Manolis Stefanakos (Greek: Μανώλης Στεφανάκος, born 17 August 1989) is a Greek professional footballer who plays as a goalkeeper.
