= Anastasios Kantoutsis =

Greek footballer

Personal information
- Full name: Anastasios Kantoutsis
- Date of birth: 23 May 1994 (age 32)
- Place of birth: Athens, Greece
- Height: 1.93 m (6 ft 4 in)
- Position: Centre back

Youth career
- –2012: Atromitos

Senior career*
Years	Team	Apps	(Gls)
2012–2015	Atromitos	0	(0)
2012–2014	→ Kalamata (loan)	50	(1)
2014–2015	→ Fokikos (loan)	20	(0)
2015–2016	Omonia	4	(0)
2016–2017	Ilisiakos	4	(1)
2016–2017	Kalamata	30	(6)
2017–2018	Kalamata	21	(2)
2018–2019	Niki Volos	29	(1)
2019–2020	Kalamata	8	(0)
2020–2021	Ialysos	12	(0)
2021–2024	Diavolitsi		
2024–2026	Miltiadis		

International career^{‡}
2009–2010	Greece U15	5	(0)
2010–2012	Greece U17	16	(1)
2012–2014	Greece U18	5	(0)
2012–2015	Greece U19	8	(0)
- * Club domestic league appearances and goals as of 21:00, 26 June 2021 (UTC) ‡ National team caps and goals as of 10 October 2014

Anastasios Kantoutsis (Greek: Αναστάσιος Καντούτσης, born 23 May 1994) is a Greek professional footballer who plays as a centre back.

== Club career ==
Born on 23 May 1994, Kantoutsis started his career with the youth squad of Atromitos, where he made a total of 68 appearances. In 2012, he was promoted to the men's team and immediately loaned out to Kalamata, where he played for the next two years, amassing a total of 50 caps. In the 2014–2015 season, Kantoutsis was once again loaned out, this time to Football League side Fokikos, where he featured in 20 matches. After he was released from his contract with Atromitos, Kantoutsis moved to Cyprus and signed a contract with Omonia. In the summer of 2016, Kantoutsis was released from his contract with the Cypriot club, and subsequently returned to Greece, signing for Gamma Ethniki side Ergotelis. Barely a month after signing his contract with the club however, Kantoutsis requested his contract be terminated for personal reasons.

== International career ==
Kantoutsis has represented Greece in the junior national teams, making several appearances for the U-15, U-17, U-18 and U-19 teams.
