= Thomas Garaklidis =

Greek footballer

Personal information
- Date of birth: 23 May 1989 (age 37)
- Place of birth: Giannitsa, Greece
- Position: Defender

Team information
- Current team: Ergotelis

Youth career
- Mavroi Aetoi Paralimnis

Senior career*
Years	Team	Apps	(Gls)
- Edessaikos
−2010	Niki Polygyros		
2010−2012	Evros Soufli	25	(1)
2012–2013	Doxa Drama	18	(0)
2013	Anagennisi Giannitsa	15	(1)
2013–2015	Nea Kavala	26	(2)
2015–2016	Doxa Drama	0	(0)
2016–2017	Ergotelis	2	(0)
- * Club domestic league appearances and goals as of 15 February 2012

Thomas Garaklidis (Greek: Θωμάς Γκαρακλίδης; born 23 May 1989) is a professional Greek football player.

== Career ==
Born in Giannitsa, Garaklidis started his professional career with Mavroi Aetoi Paralimnis, from which he moved on to Delta Ethniki clubs Edessaikos and Niki Polygyros. He then played for fellow Delta Ethniki side Evros Soufli in 2010, before making a leap in his career by moving to Super League side Doxa Drama on 28 January 2012. He played in eight Super League games with the "black eagles" before the club was relegated at the end of the season. He left Drama in January 2013, signing with his hometown club Anagennisi Giannitsa for six months, and with Nea Kavala in the summer of 2013, where he received substantially more playing time. He returned to Doxa Drama in 2015, where he stayed for 1,5 years.

In December 2016, Garaklidis signed with Cretan side Ergotelis in the Gamma Ethniki.
