= Thanasis Tegousis =

Greek footballer (born 1986)

Personal information
- Full name: Athanasios Tegousis
- Date of birth: 13 December 1986 (age 39)
- Place of birth: Agrinio, Greece
- Height: 1.75 m (5 ft 9 in)
- Position: Midfielder

Senior career*
Years	Team	Apps	(Gls)
2004–2007	Panetolikos	74	(3)
2007–2009	Panachaiki	36	(3)
2009–2011	Kallithea	61	(3)
2011–2012	Egaleo		
2012–	A.E. Kifisia		
- * Club domestic league appearances and goals

Thanasis Tegousis (Greek: Θανάσης Τεγούσης; born 13 December 1986) is a Greek footballer who last played for A.E. Kifisia in the Football League 2 (Greece) as a winger.

== Career ==
Born in Agrinio, Tegousis began his professional career with local side Panetolikos F.C. in July 2004.
