= Skoufas Kompoti F.C. =

Skoufas Kompoti
- Full name: Αθλητικός Όμιλος Σκουφάς Κομποτίου; Athlitikos Omilos Skoufas Kompoti (Skoufas Kompoti Athletic Club)
- Founded: 6 November 1952; 73 years ago
- Ground: Kompoti Stadium "Euaggelos Sergiannis"
- Chairman: Dimitrios Kaselouris
- Manager: Ilias Mangakis
- League: Arta FCA First Division
- 2025–26: Arta FCA First Division, 4th
- Website: https://skoufasfc.gr/

Skoufas Kompoti is a Greek football club, based in Kompoti, Arta.

In May 2025, the team elected a new board of directors, installing Kaselouris Dimitrios as president. In June 2025, the team announced the return of captain Panos Kaselouris, a defender, for the 2025-2026 season.

== Honours ==
=== Domestic Titles and honours ===
  - FCA Arta Champions: 8
    - 1996–97, 1998–99, 2000–01, 2006–07, 2012–2013, 2014–2015, 2016–17, 2019–20
  - FCA Arta Cup Winners: 8
    - 1997–98, 1999–00, 2000–01, 2005–06, 2006–07, 2007–08, 2008–09, 2016–17
