= Giannis Kolokas =

Greek footballer

Personal information
- Full name: Giannis Kolokas
- Date of birth: 28 June 1985 (age 41)
- Place of birth: Pyrgos, Elis, Greece
- Height: 1.89 m (6 ft 2 in)
- Position: Centre back

Team information
- Current team: Paniliakos

Youth career
- −2003: Paniliakos

Senior career*
Years	Team	Apps	(Gls)
2003−2009	Paniliakos	65	(0)
2009−2010	Ethnikos Asteras	14	(1)
2010−2013	Paniliakos	66	(1)
2013−2015	Ermionida	45	(1)
2015−2016	Panegialios	26	(1)
2016−2017	Ergotelis	10	(0)
2017	Panelefsiniakos	16	(1)
2017−2018	Paniliakos	19	(0)
- * Club domestic league appearances and goals

Giannis Kolokas (Greek: Γιάννης Κολόκας; born 28 June 1985 in Pyrgos, Elis, Greece) is a Greek footballer who currently plays for Gamma Ethniki club Paniliakos, as a centre back.
