= Zoniana =

Zoniana Ζωνιανά
- Municipal unit
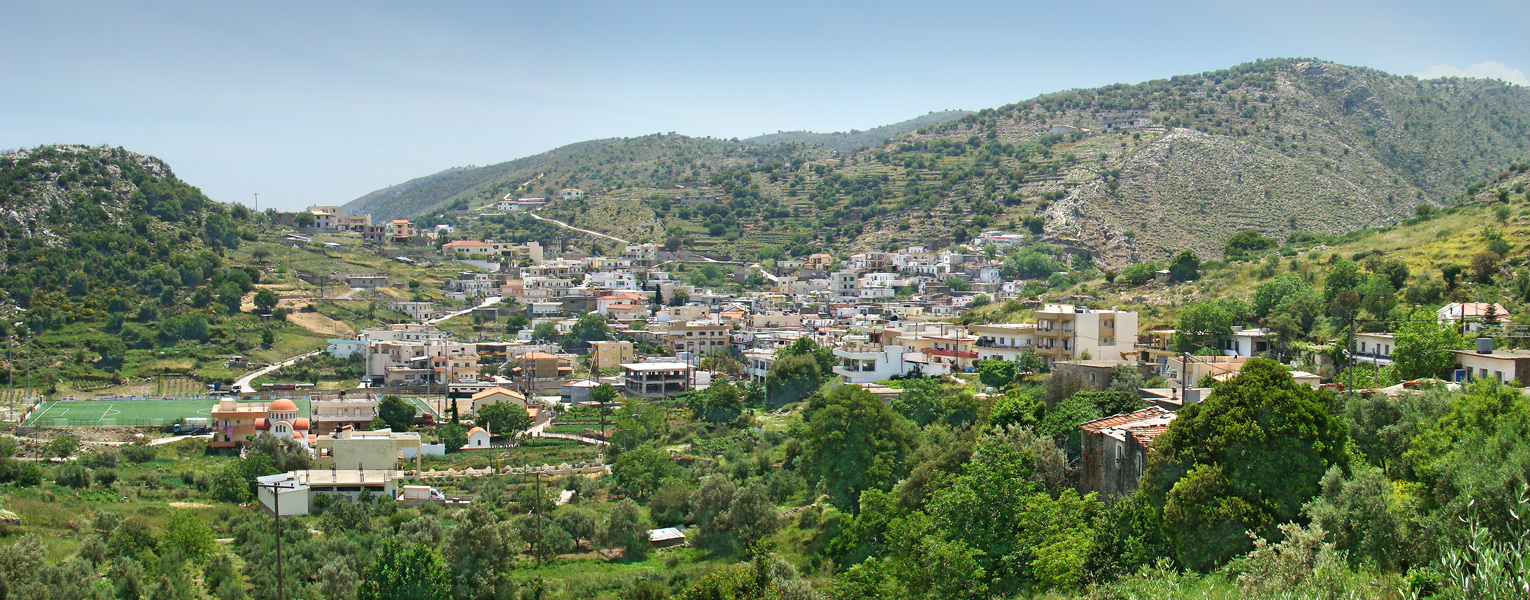
- Panoramic view of Zoniana

- Location within the regional unit

- Location within Greece
- Coordinates: 35°18′N 24°50′E
- Country: Greece
- Administrative region: Crete
- Regional unit: Rethymno
- Municipality: Mylopotamos

Area
  - Municipal unit: 17.9 km^{2} (6.9 sq mi)
- Elevation: 630 m (2,070 ft)

Population (2021)
  - Municipal unit: 1,206
  - Municipal unit density: 67.4/km^{2} (174/sq mi)
- Time zone: UTC+2 (EET)
  - Summer (DST): UTC+3 (EEST)
- Vehicle registration: ΡΕ

Zoniana (Greek: Ζωνιανά) is a town and a former municipality in the Rethymno regional unit, Crete, Greece. Since the 2011 local government reform it is part of the municipality Mylopotamos, of which it is a municipal unit. The municipal unit has an area of 17.926 km^{2} (6.921 sq mi). Population 1,206 (2021).
