= A.S. Vatolakkos F.C. =

Greek football club

A.S. Vatolakkos
- Full name: Athlitikos Syllogos Vatolakkos
- Founded: 1981; 45 years ago
- Stadium: Grevena FCA Ground
- Capacity: 500
- Chairman: Dimosthenis Vamvakas
- Manager: Giannis Samaras
- League: Gamma Ethniki
- 2025–26: Grevena FCA First Division, 1st
Home colours	Away colours

Athlitikos Syllogos Vatolakkos (Greek: Αθλητικός Σύλλογος Βατόλακκου) is a Greek football club, based in Vatolakkos, and is one of the largest sports clubs in Grevena. The colors of A.S. Vatolakkos are yellow and black. For 2026 the club plays in Gamma Ethniki.

== Honours ==
=== Domestic Titles and honours ===
  - Grevena FCA Champions: 4
    - 2014–15, 2015–16, 2024–25, 2025–26
  - Grevena FCA Cup Winners: 3
    - 2014–15, 2015–16, 2024–25
