= Makedonikos Foufas F.C. =

Association football team in Greece

Makedonikos Foufas
- Full name: Podosfairikos Syllogos Makedonikos Foufas
- Founded: 1977; 49 years ago
- Dissolved: July 2023; 3 years ago
- Ground: Municipal Ptolemaida Stadium "Emilios Theofanidis"
- Capacity: 4,000
Home colours	Away colours

Makedonikos Foufas Football Club (Greek: Π.Σ. Μακεδονικός Φούφα) was a Greek football club based in Foufas, Kozani, founded on January 1, 1977.

== Honours ==
=== Domestic titles and honors ===
  - Kozani FCA Champions: 5
    - 1991–92, 2003–04, 2007–08, 2015–16, 2021–22
  - Kozani FCA Cup Winners: 6
    - 2008–09, 2013–14, 2014–15, 2017–18, 2018–19, 2019–20
