= A.O. Zevgolateio F.C. =

AO Zevgolateio
- Full name: Athlitikos Omilos Zevgolateio
- Founded: 1969; 57 years ago
- Ground: Zevgolateio Municipal Stadium
- Chairman: Panagiotis Tsitouras
- Manager: Thanasis Meletsis
- League: Corinthia FCA First Division
- 2025–26: Corinthia FCA First Division, 5th
- Website: http://www.aozevgolatiou.org/

A.O Zevgolateio F.C. is a Greek football club, based in Zevgolateio, Corinthia.

== Honors ==
=== Domestic Titles and honors ===
  - Corinthia FCA Champions: 1
    - 2015–16
  - Corinthia FCA Cup Winners: 1
    - 2015-16
