= Achaiki F.C. =

Achaiki
- Full name: Achaiki Athlitiki Enosi
- Founded: 1920; 106 years ago
- Ground: Kato Achaea Municipal Stadium
- Capacity: 2,000
- Chairman: Giannis Nikolakopoulos
- Manager: Georgios Lagos
- League: Achaea FCA First Division
- 2025–26: Achaea FCA First Division, 2nd
Home colours

Achaiki Football Club (Greek: Αχαϊκή Α.Ε.) is a Greek football club based in Kato Achaia, Achaea, Greece.

The club was founded as an independent club in 1920 and dissolved in 1936. It we re-founded in 1945. The highest category team reached was Football League in 1981–82 and 1982–83 seasons. They played for their second season in Football League 2 for the season 2014–15.

== Honours ==
=== Domestic ===
  - Delta Ethniki Champions: 3
    - 1986–87, 1997–98, 2003–04
  - Achaea FCA Champions: 4
    - 1966–67, 1970–71, 1977–78, 2015–16
  - Achaea FCA Cup Winners: 5
    - 1976–77, 1978–79, 1979–80, 1988–89, 1996–97
  - Achaea FCA Super Cup Winners: 1
    - 2002
