= MAS Pydna Kitros F.C. =

MAS Pydna Kitros
- Full name: Morfotikos Athlitikos Syllogos Kitros "Pydna"
- Founded: 1977; 49 years ago
- Dissolved: 2017; 9 years ago
- Ground: Municipal Stadium; Kitros, Pieria, Greece
- Capacity: 800 (100 Seated)

MAS Pydna Kitros F.C. was a Greek football club, based in Kitros, Pieria.

The club was founded in 1977. In 2017 summer, its TIN was bought by agents that wanted to create a new club in Volos. The new club was named Volos NFC.

== Honors ==
=== Domestic Titles and honors ===
  - Greek Football Amateur Cup: 1
    - 2015–16
  - Eps Pieria Champions: 2
    - 2004–05, 2014–15
  - Eps Pieria Cup Winners: 3
    - 2005–06, 2014–15, 2015–16
