= A.E. Istiaia F.C. =

Greek football club

A.E. Istiaia
- Full name: Athlitiki Enosi Istiaia
- Founded: 1928; 98 years ago
- Ground: Istiaia Municipal Stadium
- Manager: Stathis Katsikogiannis
- League: Euboea FCA First Division
- 2025–26: Euboea FCA Second Division (Group 2), 2nd (promoted)

A.E. Istiaia F.C. is a Greek football club, based in Istiaia, Euboea.

The club was founded in 1928.

== Honours ==
=== Domestic ===
  - Euboea FCA Champions: 1
    - 2015–16

== Current squad ==
2019–20 season

Note: Flags indicate national team as defined under FIFA eligibility rules; some limited exceptions apply. Players may hold more than one non-FIFA nationality.

No.	Pos.	Nation	Player
—	GK	GRE	christos karatsolias
—	GK	GRE	Christos mouridis
—	GK	GRE	Anesths karagkounhs
—	GK	GRE	Giannhs kompothanasis
—	DF	ALB	Shefit kalivaci
—	DF	GRE	Athanasios psulos
—	DF	GRE	Athanasios Vasiliou
—	DF	GRE	spuros maxos
—	DF	GRE	dimitris gerogiorghs
—	DF	GRE	spuros papastamoulos
—	DF	GRE	christos giatzhs
—	DF	GRE	Anastasios Statharas
—	MF	GRE	Evaggelos gavril
—	MF	GRE	Georgios Petis
—	MF	GRE	Nikolaos Chondros
—	MF	GRE	spuros stamatopoulos
—	FW	GRE	Filippos Stamoulos
—	FW	GRE	Lefteris Stergiou

No.	Pos.	Nation	Player
—	FW	GRE	Marios Lavas
—	FW	GRE	Apostolos Mpalanos
—	FW	GRE	Antonis gerogiorgakis
—	FW	GRE	Giannhs kouromixelakis
—	FW	GRE	Leonidas Maravelhs
