= Ermis Zoniana F.C. =

Association football club in Greece

ΑΟ Ermis Zoniana
- Full name: Αθλητικός Όμιλος Ερμής Ζωνιανών; Athlitikós Ómilos Ermís Zonianón (Athletic Club Ermis Zoniana)
- Short name: Ermis Zoniana
- Founded: 1964; 62 years ago
- Ground: Zoniana Municipal Stadium
- Capacity: 500
- Chairman: Mattheos Klinis
- Manager: Kyriakos Galanos
- League: Rethymno FCA First Division
- 2025–26: Rethymno FCA First Division, 3rd
- Website: http://www.ermiszonianon.gr/
Home colours

AO Ermis Zoniana F.C., short for Athlitikos Omilos Ermis Zoniana Football Club and simply known as Ermis Zoniana, is a Greek association football club based in the village of Zoniana, located in the regional unit of Rethymno on the island of Crete. The club currently competes in the local Rethymno FCA A Division, having previously played for several seasons in the Gamma Ethniki, the third tier of the Greek football league system.

== History ==
Ermis Zoniana was founded in 1964 by a group of residents in the village of Zoniana and originally took part in Rethymno regional competitions. Over the years, the club ascended to the top-level Rethymno FCA Regional Championship, which the club won during the 2011−2012 season to earn promotion to its first ever national competition, the Delta Ethniki, which used to be the fourth tier of the Greek football league system. In what proved to be the final season in competition history (before the Delta and Gamma Ethniki were merged for the 2013−2014 season onward to form the new third level of the Greek football league pyramid), Ermis Zoniana earned a consecutive promotion to the reformed Gamma Ethniki, finishing 4th in the 2012−2013 Delta Ethniki Group 10 league table.

The club failed to avoid relegation in its inaugural season in the competition, but managed to make a swift return by once again winning the 2014−2015 Rethymno FCA Championship. In the 2015–16 Gamma Ethniki season, the club finished 6th in Group 4, thus staying clear of relegation.

During the club's tenure in the Gamma Ethniki, Ermis has had the opportunity to play against Greek giants AEK Athens during its debut season, as well as historic Cretan ex-Super League clubs OFI Crete and Ergotelis in later editions of the competition. Ermis actually managed to claim an impressive victory over OFI Crete during the 2015–16 Gamma Ethniki, recording a 1−0 home win on 22 November 2015.

== Honours ==
=== Domestic titles and honours ===
- Rethymno FCA Championship winners: 4
  - 2011−12, 2014−15, 2022−23, 2024−25
- Rethymno FCA Cup Winners: 1
  - 2012−13
- Rethymno FCA Super Cup Winners: 3
  - 2013, 2015, 2023
