= Agios Ierotheos F.C. =

Agios Ierotheos
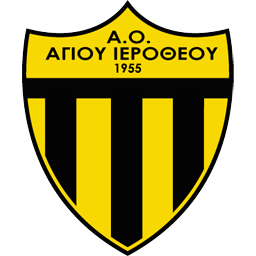
- Full name: Athlitikos Omilos Agios Ierotheos
- Founded: 1955; 71 years ago
- Ground: Choraphas Stadium
- Capacity: 600
- Chairman: Evangelos Marinos
- Manager: Makis Sassalos
- League: Athens FCA Second Division
- 2025–26: Athens FCA Second Division (Group 2), 9th
- Website: http://agiosierotheos.blogspot.gr
Home colours	Away colours

Agios Ierotheos Football Club (Greek: Α.Ο. Αγίου Ιεροθέου) is a Greek football club based in Chorafas, Peristeri, Athens, Greece.

In October 2010, police arrested 33 people following clashes between rival supporters of Agios Ierotheos and Egaleo during a Delta Ethniki match.

Agios Ierotheos appointed a new manager, Vangelis Stavrakopoulos, after a poor start to the 2017–18 Gamma Ethniki season.

== Honours ==
  - Athens FCA Champions: 3
    - 1980–81, 1993–94, 2015–16
  - Athens FCA Cup Winners: 1
    - 2020
