= Amvrakia Kostakioi F.C. =

Amvrakia Kostakioi
- Full name: Athlitikos Omilos Amvrakia Kostakioi
- Founded: 1953
- Dissolved: 2017
- Ground: Municipal Kostakioi Stadium; Kostakioi, Arta, Greece
- Capacity: 200
- Website: aokostakion.yolasite.com

Amvrakia Kostakioi F.C. was a Greek football club, based in Kostakioi, Arta. In 2017 the club played in 3rd League, Group 2.

== Honors ==
=== Domestic Titles and honors ===
  - Eps Epirus Champions: 1
    - 1965–66
  - Eps Arta Champions: 2
    - 1986–87, 2015–16
  - Eps Arta Cup Winners: 1
    - 1996-97
