= Panthiraikos F.C. =

Panthiraikos
- Full name: Πανθηραϊκός Αθλητικός Όμιλος
- Founded: 1970; 56 years ago
- Ground: Municipal Panthiraikos Stadium
- Capacity: 2,000
- Chairman: Babis Kampourakis
- Manager: Manolis Papamattheakis
- League: Cyclades FCA First Division
- 2025–26: Cyclades FCA First Division, 3rd
- Website: http://panthiraikos.gr/
Home colours	Away colours

Panthiraikos Football Club (Greek: Πανθηραϊκός Α.Ο.) is a Greek football club based in Santorini, Cyclades.

== History ==
The club started in 1969 and played against a number of other clubs from Athens, including Keratsini, Zografou (today known as Ilisiakos F.C.), Taxiarchis Alsoupolis, Aino Petroupolis and Kerameikos. Then, in 1971, the club participated in friendly games, in which they went off against Ios A.O., resulting in a 1–0 victory, Pannaxiakos 2-1 and Rin, the team of a French navy ship. With an attendance of more than 10,000 fans, Rin led the match until two goals from Biralis (25') and Gavalas (88') secured a win for the Santorinians.

In 1972, the club applied for a membership in the Piraeus Football League, yet only two other teams then participated: AO Syrou and Astir Syrou. AO Mykonos had withdrawn from the league the year before. They were rejected, along with all other teams based in the Cyclades, as several attempts had already been made before to expand the league there.

In 1980, the Football League of Cyclades was founded. Since then, they have won the 1st division three times (1984–85, 1987–88, 2015–16) and the Cyclades Cup twice, in 1989 and 2016. They participated in the third division of the National Football League (today known as the Super League Greece), and then the fourth division after their success in the Cyclades Cup for four consecutive years.

== Honours ==
=== Domestic Titles and honours ===
  - Cyclades FCA Champions: 3
    - 1984–85, 1987–88, 2015–16
  - Cyclades FCA Second Division Champions: 1
    - 2022–23
  - Cyclades FCA Cup Winners: 3
    - 1988–89, 2015–16, 2018–19
