= AE Ergazomenon Kritis SYN.KA F.C. =

AEEK SYN.KA
- Full name: Αθλητική Ένωση Εργαζομένων Κρήτης ΣΥΝ.ΚΑ; Athlitikí Énosi Ergazoménon Krítis SYN.KA (SYN.KA Athletic Union of Cretan Workers)
- Founded: 2009; 16 years ago
- Dissolved: 2021; 4 years ago
- Ground: Mournies Stadium
- Website: http://www.aeek-synka.gr/
Home colours

AEEK SYN.KA F.C., short for Athlitikí Énosi Ergazoménon Krítis SYN.KA (Greek: Αθλητική Ένωση Εργαζομένων Κρήτης ΣΥΝ.ΚΑ, translated as SYN.KA Athletic Union of Cretan Workers) was a Greek association football club based in the city of Chania on the island of Crete.

== History ==
AEEK SYN.KA was established in 2009 as AEEK IN.KA, by a group of workers in the shops of the IN.KA. Suppliers' and Consumers' Association, a chain of supermarkets operating in Crete. The club began playing in the third level of the Chania regional FCA League structure and within a few years, it won promotion to the top-level Chania FCA A Division.

In the 2015−16 season, AEEK INKA were crowned champions of Chania by finishing first in the league, and eventually earned promotion to the Gamma Ethniki for the first time in their history, by placing second in the 2016 FCA Winners' Championship. They were instantly relegated however, as they finished in 15th place in Group 4.

== Crest and colors ==
The club was founded by workers of the IN.KA. Suppliers' and Consumers' Association supermarkets chain, therefore incorporating the latter name in the club name and logo. In 2017, the supermarkets chain was renamed to SYN.KA Supermarkets therefore triggering the relevant change in the club title and logo.

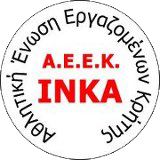
AEEK IN.KA logo (2009−2017)

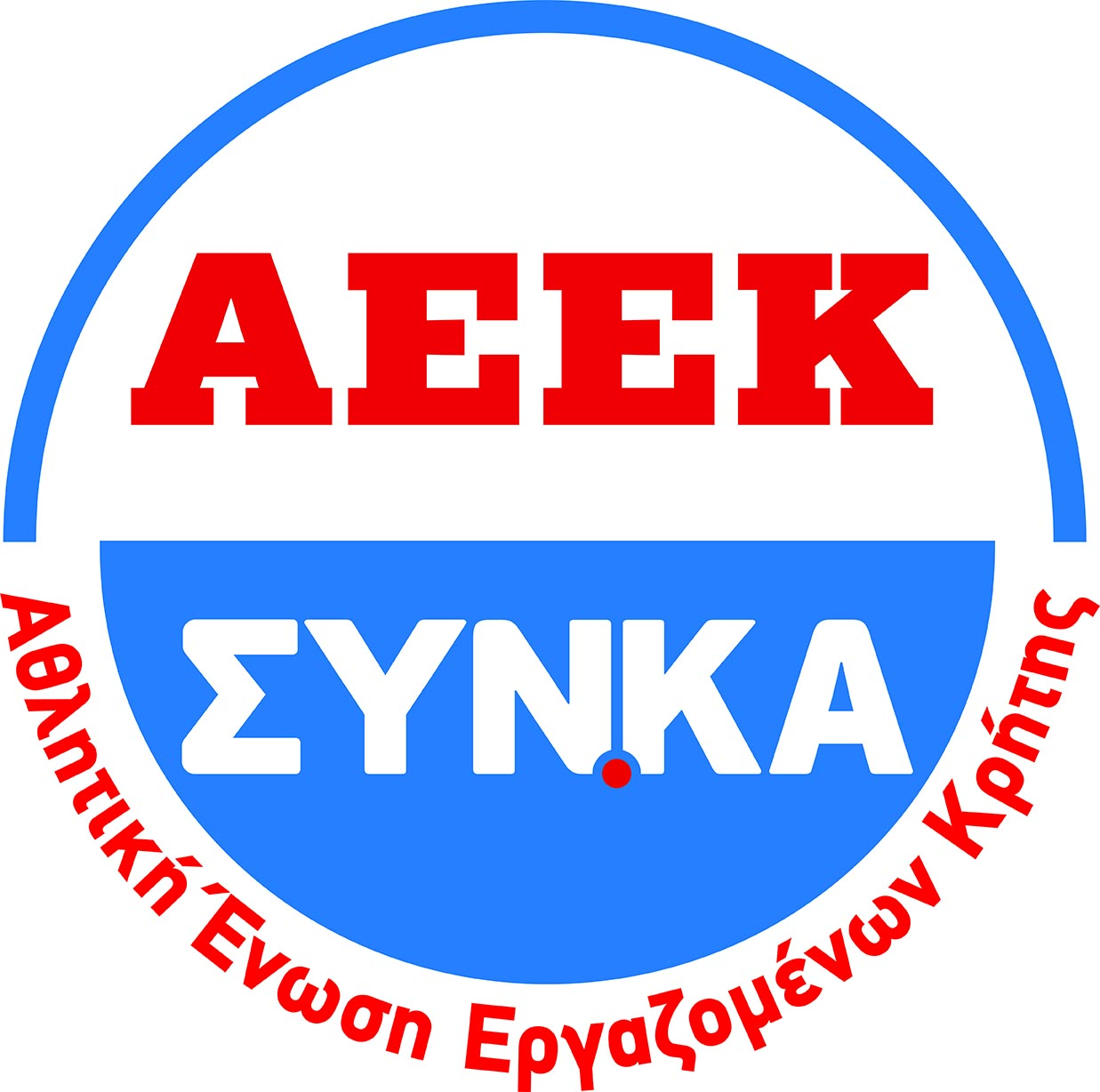
AEEK SYN.KA logo (2017−2021)

== Honours ==
=== Regional ===
- Chania FCA Championship
  - Winners (2): 2015–16, 2017–18
