= Greek football league system =

Series of interconnected leagues in Greece

The Greek association football leagues system consists of 2 nationwide professional leagues (Super League 1 Greece Limited Liability Partnership & A2 National Division Professional Football Association), 1 nationwide amateur league (Women's Football Clubs Association) and 53 regional amateur leagues (Football Clubs Associations).

== Cup eligibility ==
- Greece Super Cup: Super League 1 & Greece Cup
- Greece Cup: Super League 1 & Super League 2
- Greece Amateurs Cup: Gamma Ethniki & F.C.A. Cups Winners
- Women's Greece Cup: Women's Alpha Ethniki, Women's Beta Ethniki, Women's Gamma Ethniki

== Promotion and relegation ==
Super League: Bottom two teams are relegated to the Super League 2.

Super League 2: Top two teams are promoted to Super League. Bottom four teams are relegated to the Gamma Ethniki.

Gamma Ethniki: The champions of each group are promoted to the Super League 2. Twenty seven teams in total are relegated to the F.C.A. Championships.

F.C.A. Champion Teams Championship: The winner of each regional F.C.A. Championship qualifies for the promotion playoffs of the F.C.A. Champion Teams Championship. The top 3 teams of each of 8 promotion playoffs groups (24 total) are promoted to Gamma Ethniki.

As of 2026–27 season, Gamma Ethniki was divided in 10 groups with 10-12 teams each, winners of each group were promoted to professional Super League 2 and the bottom 3 teams are relegated to F.C.A. Championships.

As of 2026–27 season, Super League 2 has 16 teams. The top two teams are promoted to Super League 1 and the bottom 4 teams are relegated to Gamma Ethniki.

== Men's League Pyramid ==
As of 19 October 2026

Level	League(s) / Division(s)									
1	Super League 1; 14 teams									
	↓↑ 2 teams									
2	Super League 2; 16 teams									
	↓↑ 4 teams									
3	Gamma Ethniki; 113 teams divided in 10 groups									
3	Group 1; 10 teams	Group 2; 11 teams	Group 3; 11 teams	Group 4; 11 teams	Group 5; 11 teams	Group 6; 12 teams	Group 7; 12 teams	Group 8; 12 teams	Group 9; 11 teams	Group 10; 12 teams
	↓ 30 teams ↑ 24 teams									
4	F.C.A. Local Teams Championship; 56 teams divided in 8 Groups									
4	Group 1; 7 teams		Group 2; 7 teams	Group 3; 7 teams	Group 4; 7 teams	Group 5; 7 teams		Group 6; 7 teams	Group 7; 7 teams	Group 8; 7 teams

On 16 July 2006 the Alpha Ethniki was replaced as the highest league in the Greek football system by the Super League Greece 1. In 1962–2019, the Football League was the second level of the league system, until 2010 as Beta Ethniki. After the formation of Super League 2, in 2019–20 and 2020–21, the Football League was the third tier and Gamma Ethniki was the fourth tier. In 2010–2013 Gamma Ethniki as Football League 2.

53 F.C.A. Championships winners and 3 F.C.A. Championships runners-up (Athens F.C.A., Piraeus F.C.A. and Macedonia F.C.A.) qualify for promotion playoffs of the F.C.A. Champion Teams Championship.

== Women's League Pyramid ==
As of 19 October 2026

Level	League(s) / Division(s)							
1	Alpha Ethniki; 12 teams							
2	Beta Ethniki; 39 teams divided in 4 groups							
2	Group 1; 10 teams		Group 2; 10 teams		Group 3; 10 teams		Group 4; 9 teams	
3	Gamma Ethniki; 63 teams divided in 8 groups							
3	Group 1; 8 teams	Group 2; 8 teams	Group 3; 8 teams	Group 4; 8 teams	Group 5; 8 teams	Group 6; 8 teams	Group 7; 8 teams	Group 8; 7 teams

== See also ==
- Football in Greece
- Football records and statistics in Greece
- Hellenic Football Federation
- Greek Super Cup
- Greek Football Cup
- Super League Greece
- Super League Greece 2
- Greek Football Amateur Cup
- Gamma Ethniki
- Local football championships of Greece
- Greek FCA Winners' Championship
- Greek Women's Cup
- Greek A Division (women's football)
- Greek B Division (women's football)
