= Manolis Moniakis =

Greek footballer (born 1988)

Personal information
- Full name: Emmanouil Moniakis
- Date of birth: 9 November 1988 (age 37)
- Place of birth: Heraklion, Greece
- Height: 1.78 m (5 ft 10 in)
- Position: Left back

Team information
- Current team: O.F. Arkalochoriou
- Number: 12

Youth career
- –2006: Ergotelis

Senior career*
Years	Team	Apps	(Gls)
2006–2010	OFI	39	(0)
2010–2011	Olympiacos	0	(0)
2011	→ Kerkyra (loan)	2	(0)
2011–2015	OFI	44	(1)
2015–2017	AEL	37	(0)
2017–2018	OFI	9	(0)
2018–2019	Mylopotamos		
2019–2020	Almyros Gazi		
2020–	O.F. Arkalochoriou		

International career^{‡}
2006–2007	Greece U19	10	(0)
2007–2008	Greece U21	5	(0)
- * Club domestic league appearances and goals as of 13:52, 12 September 2019 (UTC) ‡ National team caps and goals as of 25 July 2015

Manolis Moniakis (Greek: Μανώλης Μονιάκης; born 9 November 1988) is a Greek professional footballer, who plays as a left back for O.F.Arkalochoriou in the Heraklion FCA A1 Championship, a regional league in the fifth tier of the Greek football league system.

== Club career ==
Born in Heraklion, Moniakis began playing football in the Ergotelis Youth Academy. Considered among the greatest Cretan talents in his generation, and having already received call-ups for the Greece U19, Moniakis sparked controversy in November 2006, when he left the club as soon as he turned 18 to sign his first professional contract with Ergotelis' local arch rival OFI. He played for the senior side of OFI from January 2007 until December 2010, featuring in 32 Super League games. However, he tested positive for cocaine in March 2009, and received a six-month suspension. After his return to action, Moniakis capitalized on his performances with OFI, earning a transfer to Olympiacos. He signed a four-year contract with the club in January 2011, and was immediately loaned out to fellow Super League side Kerkyra for six months.

His stay with the Piraeus-club was short-lived however, and at the start of 2011-12 season, Moniakis returned to OFI. He played for the Cretans until March 2015, when OFI announced that they were withdrawing from the Super League as the administration failed to meet the club's pressing financial obligations.

In July 2015, Moniakis signed a contract with Greek Football League side AEL, for an undisclosed fee. He was one of the key players, helping the club earn promotion to the Super League. He left the club on mutual consent on 5 May 2017. In July the same year, Moniakis made his second comeback to his former club OFI, at the time playing in the Football League, signing a two-year contract. After winning the Division title in 2018, Moniakis was waived by the club, and subsequently signed with recently relegated Rethymno FCA A Division club Mylopotamos. After helping the club swiftly return to the Gamma Ethniki, Moniakis returned to Heraklion in July 2019 to sign with Heraklion FCA A1 Division club Almyros Gazi.

== International career ==
Moniakis played for the Greece Under-19 and Greece Under-21 national football teams between 2006 and 2008.

== Honours ==
=== Club ===
==== AEL ====
- Football League: Winner: 2015–16

==== OFI ====
- Football League: Winner: 2017–18
