= Gymnastics Club Ergotelis =

Greek multi-sport club

Ergotelis
- Full name: Γυμναστικός Σύλλογος «Ο Εργοτέλης» Ηρακλείου Κρήτης; Gymnastikós Sýllogos «Ó Ergotélis» Iraklíou Krítis (Gymnastics Club «Ergotelis» Heraklion Crete)
- Nicknames: ĺ Kritikí (The Cretans) ĺ Kitrinómavri (The Yellow-Blacks); Érgo
- Founded: 7 August 1929; 97 years ago as Athlitikí Énosis «Ó Ergotélis»
- Colours: Yellow, Black
- Anthem: Ýmnos Ergotéli (Nikos Tzortzoglou, Giannis Lydakis)
- Chairman: Georgios Steikákis
- Website: Club home page

The Gymnastics Club «Ergotelis» Heraklion Crete (Greek: Γυμναστικός Σύλλογος «O Εργοτέλης» Ηρακλείου Κρήτης, Γ.Σ. Εργοτέλης), also known simply as Ergotelis (Greek: Εργοτέλης), is a Greek multi sport club based in Heraklion, Crete. The name of the club was inspired by that of the famous ancient Cretan expatriate Olympic runner Ergoteles of Himera. Officially founded in 1929, Ergotelis' colours are yellow and black. The club runs multiple football and basketball departments for both men and women playing in both regional and domestic competitions.

== Departments ==
=== Football ===
==== Men's ====
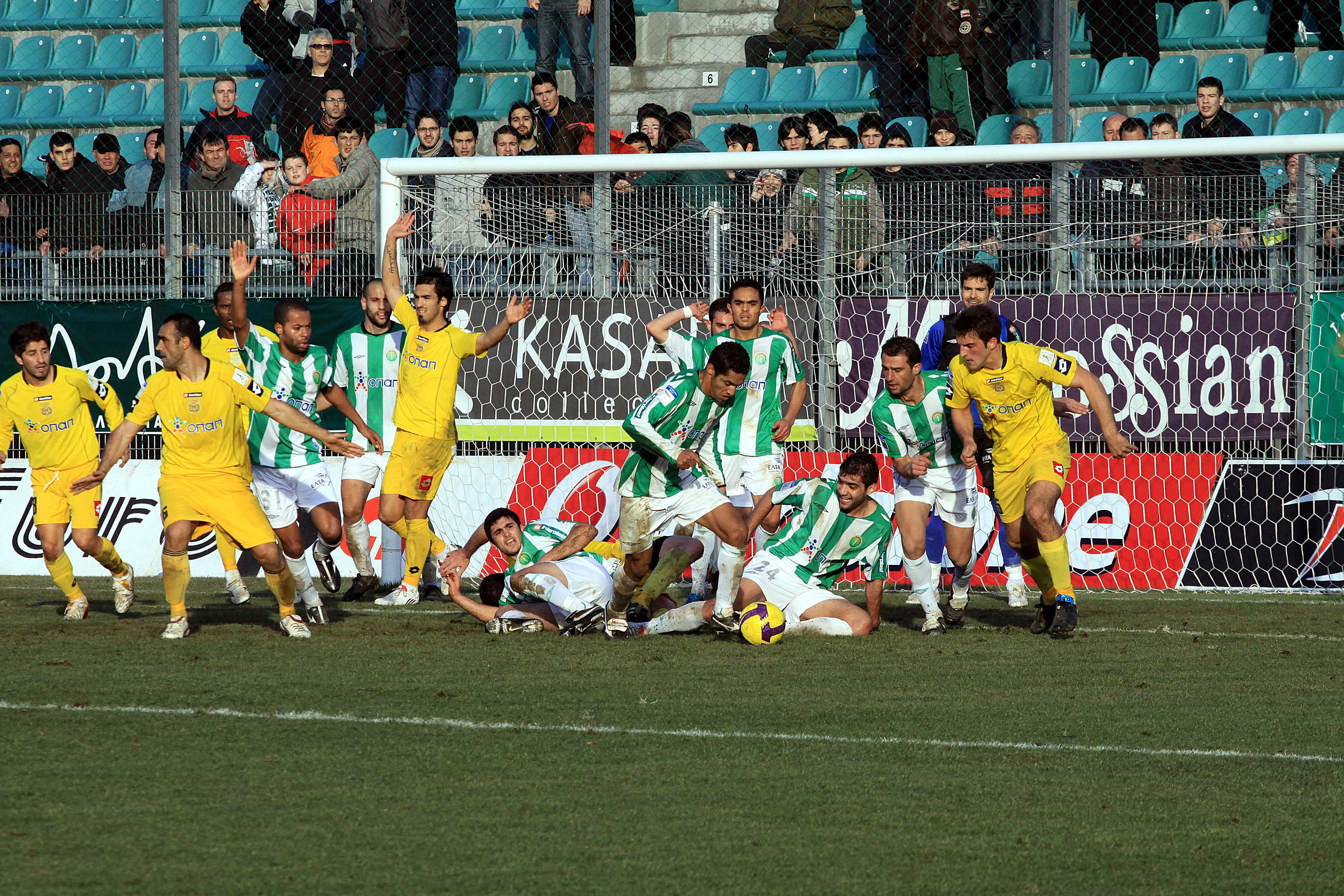
Snapshot from an Ergotelis Super League match vs. Panthrakikos during the 2009-10 season.

Ergotelis currently maintains multiple football departments. The men's Ergotelis Football Club is based in Heraklion and is the club's oldest and most successful department, officially established in 1929. The club currently competes in the Football League, the second tier of the Greek football league system, and hosts its home games at the Pankritio Stadium, the city's largest and most modern sports venue. Ergotelis F.C. is one of the two Heraklion-based football clubs to have competed in the Greek Super League, the country's top-level football competition, having made a total of 9 appearances during 2004–2015. The club's best finish in the competition is 7th place during the 2013–14 season. It has also won the Beta Ethniki (second tier of the Greek football league system) once, in 2006, as well as the Greek Football Amateur Cup in 1983.

Other football departments maintained by Ergotelis include Neoi Ergoteli (Greek: Νέοι Εργοτέλη, Young Ergotelis (♂)), Kanaria Ergoteli (Greek: Κανάρια Εργοτέλη, Ergotelis' Canaries) and the 2016-established Martinengo (Greek: Μαρτινένγκο). All of the aforementioned clubs are run through the Ergotelis Youth Academy, consisting primarily of young athletes registered in the club's infrastructure segments, based in the privately owned Ergotelis Athletic Centre. The club has determined for these teams to compete in various regional competitions of the Heraklion FCA football league system, passing on promotion rights in favor of internally moving players to the higher divisions on age-based criteria, as well as signing outstanding players to Ergotelis F.C. an its U-19 squad instead. All aforementioned teams host their home games at the Nikos Kazantzakis Stadium.

Club	Current Season (2018−19)
Ergotelis F.C.	Football League
Neoi Ergoteli	Heraklion FCA A2 Championship
Kanaria Ergoteli	Heraklion FCA B Championship (Group 1)
Martinengo	Heraklion FCA C Championship

==== Women's ====
Ergotelis has traditionally maintained a strong senior Women's football department. Nees Ergoteli (Greek: Νέες Εργοτέλη, Young Ergotelis (♀)) was Ergotelis' women's team in the Pan-Hellenic Women's Football Championship for many years. It is the most successful Women's Football Club in Crete, clinging to a 4th-place finish in the highest professional women's football league in Greece and reaching the Greek Women's Cup semi-finals during the 2015−2016 season. Many of the club's athletes have received multiple call-ups for the Greek women's national football team as a result of the club's success. However, internal disputes led to the club's board of directors to decide to dissolve the club in September 2016, «aiming to purge people and practices that are inappropriate for the ethos and history of Ergotelis». They are currently playing in the Gamma Ethniki, the third tier in the league structure.

In 2012, Ergotelis established a second women's football department, named after the parent club G.S. Ergotelis (Greek: Γ.Σ. Εργοτέλης) and consisting primarily of younger athletes from the club's training academies. After shutting down Nees Ergoteli in 2016, this club became the senior Ergotelis Women's football department. After its internal promotion to senior squad, Ergotelis won back-to-back Division titles in both the Gamma and Beta Ethniki, third and second tiers of the Greek women's football league system, thus managing a swift return of Ergotelis Women's football back to top-flight. They since compete in the Pan-Hellenic Women's Football Championship, the top tier of the Greek women's football league system.

Club	Current Season (2018−19)
Ergotelis W.F.C.	Alpha Ethniki
Nees Ergoteli	Gamma Ethniki

=== Basketball ===
The club's men's basketball department was founded in 1968, the same year it joined the registers of the Greek Federation of Sporting Clubs. In 1983, Ergotelis was one of the clubs that signed the establishment of the Cretan Basketball Associations Union. Currently, both men's and women's basketball departments are amateur clubs, that host home games at the Lido Indoor Hall in Heraklion, a basketball court with a capacity of 1,400 spectators.

The men's basketball department currently competes in the Cretan Basketball League, and holds the record for most regional titles won in Crete, having won a total of 15 regional Championships and two Cretan Cups, since the Cretan Local Basketball Committee, the governing body of basketball on the island, was founded in 1968 (and replaced by the Cretan Basketball Associations Union in 1983). It was the first Cretan basketball club to debut in national competitions in 1977, and first club managed by legendary Greek basketball coach, Giannis Ioannidis.

Club	Current Season (2018−19)
Ergotelis B.C.	Cretan Basket League (men)
Ergotelis W.B.C.	Cretan Basket League (women)

== Honours ==
=== Men's Football ===
==== Domestic ====
- Football League (2nd National Division)
  - Winners (1): 2005–06
- Gamma Ethniki (3rd National Division)
  - Winners (2): 1965–66, 2016−17
- Delta Ethniki (4th National Division)
  - Winners (2): 1984–85, 1995–96
- FCA Winners' Championship
  - Winners (1): 1970
- Amateur Cup
  - Winners (1): 1982–83

==== Regional ====
- Heraklion FCA Championship
  - Winners (7): 1949−50, 1952–53, 1963−64, 1967–68, 1969–70, 1974–75, 1976–77
- Heraklion FCA Cup
  - Winners (6): 1976–77, 1980–81, 1981–82, 1982–83, 1984–85, 1995–96

=== Women's Football ===
==== Domestic ====
- Beta Ethniki (2nd National Division)
  - Winners (3): 2001–02, 2007–08, 2017–18
- Gamma Ethniki (3rd National Division)
  - Winners (1): 2016–17
- Greek Women's Cup
  - Semi-Finals (1): 2015−2016

=== Men's Basketball ===
==== Regional ====
- Cretan A Basketball League
  - Winners (15) (record): 1969, 1970, 1971, 1974, 1976, 1977, 1979, 1982, 1985, 1990, 1992, 1994, 1997, 2002, 2010.
- Cretan Cup
  - Winners (2): 1983, 2010.

== Notable supporters ==
- Patrick Ogunsoto, football player, former Ergotelis player
- Apostolos Papoutsakis, entrepreneur, former Ergotelis FC owner
