= Nikos Kazantzakis Stadium =

Football stadium in Heraklion, Crete, Greece

- Martinengo Stadium
- Interactive map of Nikos Kazantzakis Stadium
- Full name: Ergotelis Athletic Centre − «Nikos Kazantzakis» Stadium (Αθλητικό Κέντρο Εργοτέλη − Γήπεδο «Νίκος Καζαντζάκης»)
- Former names: Ergotelis Stadium
- Location: Heraklion, Greece
- Coordinates: 35°19′54″N 25°07′50″E
- Owner: Gymnastics Club Ergotelis
- Operator: Gymnastics Club Ergotelis
- Capacity: 1,000 (~600 seated)
- Surface: Artificial turf
- Scoreboard: No

Construction
- Built: 1946
- Opened: 3 November 1946

Tenants
- Ergotelis Youth Academy; Ergotelis (women); Poros; Ethnikos Heraklion; P.O. Heraklion; AO Tiganitis; Ergotelis (men, 1946−2004, 2022−)

The «Nikos Kazantzakis» Stadium (Greek: Γήπεδο «Νίκος Καζαντζάκης»), formerly known as Ergotelis Stadium and more commonly as Martinengo Stadium, is a football stadium located on the Martinengo bastion, part of the fortifications of Heraklion, on the island of Crete. It is named after Modern Greek literature giant Nikos Kazantzakis, whose grave is also located on the same bastion. It is part of the Ergotelis Athletic Centre, a sport facilities complex owned by Greek multi-sport club Ergotelis. Built in 1946, as Ergotelis Stadium (Greek: Γήπεδο Εργοτέλη), it was the traditional home ground of Greek football club Ergotelis until 2004, when the club moved to the Pankritio Stadium, Heraklion's largest and most modern sports venue. The complex currently houses the Ergotelis Youth Academy, the largest youth sports academy on the island of Crete, and one of the largest in Greece, while the stadium itself is still used as the home ground of multiple Heraklion football clubs playing in the Heraklion Football Clubs Association amateur league system. It has a capacity of about 1,000 spectators, of which approximately 600 can be seated.

== Location ==
The stadium is located on the fortifications of Heraklion, atop the Martinengo bastion, in close proximity to Nikos Kazantzakis' grave. The stadium's location name Martinengo is often used to refer to the venue itself. Since being declared unfit for use in Greek domestic competitions in 2004 (the year of Ergotelis' first ever promotion to the Greek Super League) due to outdated facilities, archaeological authorities in Heraklion have blocked Ergotelis' attempts at renovating the stadium on multiple occasions, due to the location's historical significance, and have raised preservation concerns as a reason for evicting Ergotelis of their home turf. The club is therefore forced to rent out and play its home games in the city's larger and more modern Pankritio Stadium.

== History ==
The Ergotelis Stadium was officially opened on 3 November 1946, hosting a friendly game between the city's most prestigious football clubs and rivals, Ergotelis and OFI. In 1948, the Greek Ministry of Education gave Ergotelis their written concession for the use of the Martinengo bastion for sports facilities, thus officially recognizing the occupation-use of the area by Ergotelis. In 2004, the Martinengo facilities were officially designated as an Olympic practice field in the context of the 2004 Summer Olympics hosted in Greece. In 2017, the Gymnastics Club Ergotelis board of directors named the stadium after Greek writer Nikos Kazantzakis, whose grave is located on the top of the Martinengo bastion. Having been the home ground of Ergotelis for almost 60 years (1946−2004), the stadium is most vividly linked to a controversial concert held by left-liberal songwriter and composer Mikis Theodorakis (a key voice against the 1967–1974 right-wing government) on 6 August 1966, which to this day many hold as the foremost reason for Ergotelis' shut-down by the Greek military junta in 1967, and the club's eventual decline in lower regional and national competitions for a period lasting almost 30 years.
