= Kostas Stamatis =

Greek basketball player

Konstantinos Stamatis Κωνσταντίνος Σταμάτης
No. 9 – Ergotelis
- Position: Point guard
- League: Greek B Basket League

Personal information
- Born: April 1, 1990 (age 36)
- Listed height: 6 ft 0.5 in (1.84 m)

Career information
- Playing career: 2008–present

Career history
- 2008–2010: AEK
- 2012–2013: Livadeia
- 2013–2014: Ergotelis
- 2014–2015: Livadeia
- 2015–2016: Ikaros Kallitheas
- 2017-18: Ergotelis

Kostas Stamatis (Greek: Κώστας Σταμάτης; born 1990) is a Greek professional basketball player. He is 1.84 m (6 ft 0.5 in) in height and plays at the point guard position. He is currently playing with Cretan club Ergotelis in the Greek B Basket League.
