= Nikos Chouchoumis =

Greek basketball player

Nikos Chouchoumis Νίκος Χουχούμης
Artland Dragons
- Position: Point guard / shooting guard
- League: ProA

Personal information
- Born: May 1, 1996 (age 30) Mani, Greece
- Listed height: 6 ft 1.25 in (1.86 m)
- Listed weight: 210 lb (95 kg)

Career information
- Playing career: 2013–present

Career history
- 2013–2014: Panelefsiniakos
- 2014–2015: Aries Trikala
- 2015–2016: Titanes Palama
- 2016–2017: Ergotelis
- 2017–2018: Psychiko
- 2018–2019: Kavala
- 2019–2020: Koroivos Amaliadas
- 2020–2022: AOK Chania
- 2022–2023: Charilaos Trikoupis
- 2023–2024: Mykonos
- 2024–present: Artland Dragons

Nikos Chouchoumis (alternate spellings: Nikolaos, Houhoumis) (Greek: Νίκος Χουχούμης; (born May 1, 1996) is a Greek professional basketball player for Artland Dragons of the Pro A German League. He is a 1.86 m. tall combo guard.

== Professional career ==
Chouchoumis made his professional debut with Panelefsiniakos against Panathinaikos where his team lost 74–35. In 2014 he signed with Aries Trikala In 2016 he signed with B League Cretan club Ergotelis On November 12, after failing to find a contract in the NBA G League, Chouchoumis joined Kavala.

On July 19, 2023, he joined Mykonos of the Greek A2 Basket League. On January 4, 2024, he left Mykonos and joined Artland Dragons of the ProA.
