= Ergotelis Youth Academy =

Football academy system of Greek professional football club Ergotelis

Ergotelis Football Academy
- Full name: Πρότυπη Ακαδημία Εργοτέλη (Ergotelis Exemplar Academy)
- Ground: Nikos Kazantzakis Stadium, Heraklion, Crete, Greece
- Capacity: 1,000 (~600 seated)
- Owner: Gymnastics Club Ergotelis
- Chairman: Georgios Steiakakis
- Website: http://www.ergotelis.gr/gr/akadimia
Home colours	Away colours	Third colours

Ergotelis Football Academy is the football academy system of Greek professional football club Ergotelis. It is the largest youth sports academy on the island of Crete, hosting over 40 age-based boys' and girls' football departments, and one of the largest in Greece, registering over 900 children and adolescents aged 6−21 years old. The academy currently maintains various competitive departments, including the club's official youth team (Under-19), as well as an additional other 3 age-based sister clubs, all subsidiaries to the Gymnastics Club Ergotelis (Neoi Ergoteli, Kanaria Ergoteli, Martinengo). Ergotelis' U19 team currently plays in the Greek Football League's youth competition (Football League U19), while the other three teams participate at various levels of the Heraklion Football Clubs Association League system.

== Academy Personnel ==
As of 23 July 2018

General Manager	(Greece) Manolis Sevastakis
U−19 Coach	(Greece) Lefteris Kornaros
U−19 FitnessCoach	(Greece) Vacant
U−19 Goalkeepers' Coach	(Greece) Michalis Ximerakis
Neoi Ergoteli Coach	(Greece) Georgios Vlatas
Neoi Ergoteli General Manager	(Greece) Nikos Fantaoutsakis
Kanaria Ergoteli Coach	(Greece) Panagiotis Kordonouris
Kanaria Ergoteli General Manager	(Greece) Manolis Grammatikakis
Martinengo Coach	(Greece) Antonis Fragkakis
Martinengo General Manager	(Greece) Kostas Mavrakis

== Ergotelis U-19 ==
Ergotelis U−19 (Greek: Εργοτέλης Κ−19) is the official U−19 youth team of Ergotelis. They currently play in the Greek Football League's youth competition (Football League U19).

=== Squad ===
P. Players with professional contract.
As of 10 September 2020

Note: Flags indicate national team as defined under FIFA eligibility rules; some limited exceptions apply. Players may hold more than one non-FIFA nationality.

No.	Pos.	Nation	Player
—	GK	GRE	Leonidas Vlachakis
—	GK	GRE	Alexandros Stavrakakis
—	GK	GRE	Nikos Psimopoulos (P.)
—	DF	GRE	Antonis Venerakis
—	DF	GRE	Giannis Theodorakis (P.)
—	DF	ALB	Edison Kola (P.)
—	DF	GRE	Roberto Lushi
—	DF	GRE	Lucio Mehmetaj
—	DF	GRE	Arkadios Plaitakis
—	DF	GRE	Dimitris Stefanakis
—	MF	GRE	Giorgos Archontakis

No.	Pos.	Nation	Player
—	MF	GRE	Antonis Daskalakis
—	MF	GRE	Spiros Blushaj
—	MF	GRE	Marios Paya
—	MF	GRE	Nikitas Sfakianakis
—	MF	GRE	Angelos Chaidini
—	FW	GRE	Stathis Kapouranis
—	FW	GRE	Ippokratis Komninos
—	FW	GRE	Giannis Koutantos (P.)
—	FW	GRE	Alexandros Bernikou
—	FW	GRE	Themis Patrinos (P.)
—	FW	GRE	Giannis Stamatakis

=== Personnel ===
As of 23 January 2020

Head Coach	(Greece) Lefteris Kornaros
Goalkeepers' Coach	(Greece) Manolis Melibasakis
Goalkeepers' Coach	(Greece) Georgios Kalaitzakis

== Neoi Ergoteli ==
Neoi Ergoteli
- Full name: Νέοι Εργοτέλη (Young Ergotelis)
- Ground: Nikos Kazantzakis Stadium, Heraklion, Crete, Greece
- Capacity: 1,000 (~600 seated)
- Owner: Gymnastics Club Ergotelis
- Manager: Antonis Fragkakis
- Website: http://www.ergotelis.gr/gr/akadimia
Home colours	Away colours

Neoi Ergoteli (Greek: Νέοι Εργοτέλη, transliterated Ergotelis' Youth) is a sister club to Ergotelis and a subsidiary to the parent sports club of the same name. It acts as an unofficial reserve team to Ergotelis U−19. They compete in the regional Heraklion FCA A2 Division, the second tier of the regional League system, and by the club board's decision, are ineligible for promotion.

=== Squad ===
As of 23 January 2020

Note: Flags indicate national team as defined under FIFA eligibility rules; some limited exceptions apply. Players may hold more than one non-FIFA nationality.

No.	Pos.	Nation	Player
—	GK	GRE	Michael Iatrakis
—	DF	GRE	Dimitrios Kokkas
—	DF	GRE	Myron Mataliotakis
—	DF	GRE	Ioannis Tzagkarakis
—	MF	GRE	Emmanuel Androulakis
—	MF	GRE	Minas Kritsotakis
—	MF	GRE	Adamantios Paspalakis

No.	Pos.	Nation	Player
—	MF	GRE	Keidi Tsakoni
—	MF	GRE	Stefanos Tsamantiotis
—	FW	GRE	Nikolaos Anastasiadis
—	FW	GRE	Konstantinos Theodorakis
—	FW	GRE	Malo Kevani
—	FW	GRE	Alexandros Mourtzakis
—	FW	GRE	Dimitrios Pakioufakis

== Kanaria Ergoteli ==
Kanaria Ergoteli
- Full name: Κανάρια Εργοτέλη (Ergotelis' Canaries)
- Founded: 1995
- Ground: Nikos Kazantzakis Stadium, Heraklion, Crete, Greece
- Capacity: 1,000 (~600 seated)
- Owner: Gymnastics Club Ergotelis
- Manager: Georgios Vlatas
- Website: http://www.ergotelis.gr/gr/akadimia
Home colours	Away colours

Kanaria Ergoteli (Greek: Κανάρια Εργοτέλη, transliterated Ergotelis' Canaries) is a sister club to Ergotelis and a subsidiary to the parent sports club of the same name. It was founded in 1995,. After several years inactive, the club reverted to full operation in 2015. It acts as an unofficial U−17 youth team. They compete in the regional Heraklion FCA B Division, the third tier of the regional League system, and by the club board's decision, are ineligible for promotion.

=== Squad ===
As of 23 January

Note: Flags indicate national team as defined under FIFA eligibility rules; some limited exceptions apply. Players may hold more than one non-FIFA nationality.

No.	Pos.	Nation	Player
—	GK	GRE	Georgios Galanakis
—	GK	GRE	Ilias Georgantas
—	DF	GRE	Lyberis Lyberidis
—	DF	GRE	Andi Preskefa
—	DF	GRE	Guram Dvauri
—	DF	GRE	Georgios Tsakirakis
—	DF	GRE	Ioannis Tseros
—	DF	GRE	Rafaelo Hoxha
—	MF	GRE	Vasilios Kozanidis
—	MF	GRE	Christos Koutantos
—	MF	GRE	Aldo Dollakaj

No.	Pos.	Nation	Player
—	MF	GRE	Georgios Parasyris
—	MF	GRE	Eleftherios Platokoukis
—	MF	GRE	Ioannis Rethemniotakis
—	MF	GRE	Konstantinos Stampoulis
—	MF	GRE	Evangelos Tsagkarakis
—	MF	GRE	Sarandis Tsormpatzoudis
—	FW	GRE	Sabri Vila
—	FW	GRE	Andreas Kokkinos
—	FW	GRE	Georgios Kraniotakis
—	FW	GRE	Konstantinos Fanourgiakis
—	FW	GRE	Georgios Foniadakis

== Martinengo ==
Martinengo
- Full name: Μαρτινεγκο Αθλητικός Σύλλογος Ηρακλείου (Martinengo Athletic Club Heraklion)
- Founded: 30 July 2016; 10 years ago
- Ground: Nikos Kazantzakis Stadium, Heraklion, Crete, Greece
- Capacity: 1,000 (~600 seated)
- Owner: Gymnastics Club Ergotelis
- Manager: Panagiotis Kordonouris
- Website: http://www.ergotelis.gr/gr/akadimia
Home colours	Away colours

Martinengo (Greek: Μαρτινέγκο, named after the Martinengo bastion on top of which the Ergotelis Athletic Centre is located) is a sister club to Ergotelis and a subsidiary to the parent sports club of the same name. It is the most recent football department established by the club, founded in 2016 to act as an unofficial U−15 youth team. They compete in the regional Heraklion FCA C Division, the fourth tier of the regional League system, and by the club board's decision, are ineligible for promotion.

=== Squad ===
As of 23 January 2020

Note: Flags indicate national team as defined under FIFA eligibility rules; some limited exceptions apply. Players may hold more than one non-FIFA nationality.

No.	Pos.	Nation	Player
—	GK	GRE	Evangelos Drosatakis
—	GK	GRE	Nikolaos Kalogiannakis
—	GK	GRE	Athanasios Kinas
—	DF	GRE	Michalis Galanakis
—	DF	GRE	Petros Divanis
—	DF	GRE	Dimitrios Krasanakis
—	DF	GRE	Konstantinos Merkoulidis
—	DF	GRE	Konstantinos Beqaj
—	DF	GRE	Marios Skrafnakis
—	DF	GRE	Syria Hoxha
—	MF	GRE	Ioannis Gkionis
—	MF	GRE	Georgios Kalaitzakis

No.	Pos.	Nation	Player
—	MF	GRE	Ioannis Kritsotakis
—	MF	GRE	Emmanuel Mattheos
—	MF	GRE	Mario Daya
—	MF	GRE	Iasonas Rasoulis
—	MF	GRE	Stavros Sfakianakis
—	FW	GRE	Diogenis Kalaitzakis
—	FW	GRE	Daniel Disha
—	FW	GRE	Ioannis Pakioufakis
—	FW	GRE	Michael Papadakis
—	FW	GRE	Dimitrios Papadakis-Chatzigiannakis
—	FW	GRE	Leikado Hoxha

== Nees Ergoteli ==
Nees Ergoteli
- Full name: Νέες Εργοτέλη (Young Ergotelis)
- Ground: Nikos Kazantzakis Stadium, Heraklion, Crete, Greece
- Capacity: 1,000 (~600 seated)
- Owner: Gymnastics Club Ergotelis
- Manager: Gianna Douka
- Website: http://www.ergotelis.gr/gr/gunaikes
Home colours

Nees Ergoteli (Greek: Νέες Εργοτέλη, transliterated Ergotelis' Youth) is a sister club to Ergotelis Women's Soccer and a subsidiary to the parent sports club of the same name. It acts as a reserve team to Ergotelis. They compete in the Gamma Ethniki, the third tier of the Greek women's football league system.

=== Squad ===
As of 24 April 2019

Note: Flags indicate national team as defined under FIFA eligibility rules; some limited exceptions apply. Players may hold more than one non-FIFA nationality.

No.	Pos.	Nation	Player
—	GK	GRE	Efthymia Fragkouli
—	DF	GRE	Marirena Apostolaki
—	DF	GRE	Thaleia Vaxevani
—	DF	GRE	Anastasia Dolapsaki
—	DF	GRE	Glykeria Kokouva
—	DF	GRE	Marichrysa Papadaki
—	DF	GRE	Stella Stamataki

No.	Pos.	Nation	Player
—	DF	GRE	Lydia Chalabalaki
—	MF	GRE	Kiki Karpathiotaki
—	MF	GRE	Rena Liodaki
—	FW	GRE	Vasiliki Larou
—	FW	GRE	Katerina Papadaki
—	FW	GRE	Marianna Rapani
—	FW	GRE	Maria Saridaki

== Former Academy Players ==
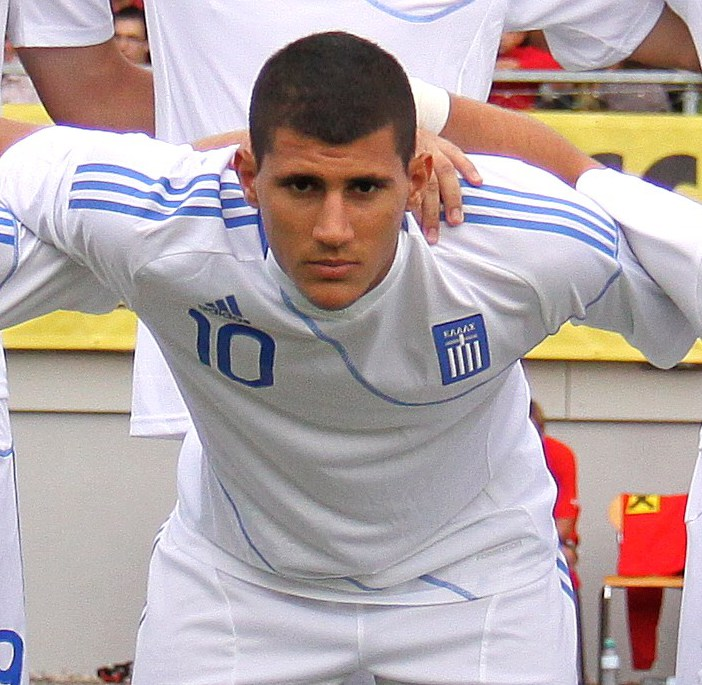
Nikos Karelis

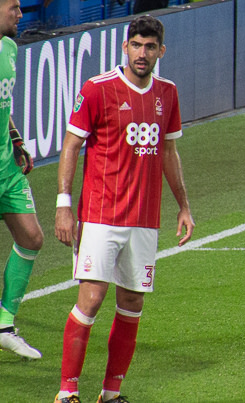
Andreas Bouchalakis

Greece

- (Greece) Andreas Bouchalakis
- (Greece) Antonis Bourselis
- (Greece) Bruno Chalkiadakis
- (Greece) Christos Chrysofakis
- (Greece) Alkis Dimitris
- (Greece) Giannis Domatas
- (Greece) Giannis Iatroudis
- (Greece) Nikos Karelis
- (Greece) Zacharias Kavousakis
- (Greece) Leonardo Koutris
- (Greece) Chrysovalantis Kozoronis
- (Greece) Manolis Moniakis
- (Greece) Epaminondas Pantelakis
- (Greece) Georgios Sarris
- (Greece) Manolis Tzanakakis
- (Greece) Manolis Saliakas

Albania

- (Albania) Albi Alla

Serbia

- (Serbia) Nikola Stojanović
