= Giannis Petrakis =

Greek footballer and manager

Personal information
- Full name: Ioannis Petrakis
- Date of birth: 20 May 1959 (age 67)
- Place of birth: Rethymno, Crete, Greece
- Position: Midfielder

Senior career*
| Years | Team | Apps | (Gls) |
| −1978 | Asteras Perama | | |
| 1978–1981 | Ergotelis | | |
| 1981–1985 | OFI | | |
| 1985–1988 | Ergotelis | | |
| 1988–1990 | EAR Rethymno | | |
| 1990–1991 | Poseidon Heraklion | | |

Managerial career
- 1991–1992: Asteras Perama
- 1992–1994: Ergotelis
- 1994–1995: Asteras Perama
- 1997–1998: Irodotos
- 1998–2000: PANO Malia
- 2000–2002: OFI
- 2002–2003: OFI (assistant)
- 2003–2004: Irodotos
- 2004–2006: Asteras Tripolis
- 2006–2009: Asteras Rethymno
- 2009–2010: Nea Ionia
- 2010–2011: Ionikos
- 2011–2012: Chania
- 2013: OFI
- 2013–2014: Ergotelis
- 2014–2019: PAS Giannina
- 2020: Olympiakos Nicosia
- 2020–2021: Apollon Limassol
- 2021: Apollon Smyrnis
- 2022: Olympiakos Nicosia
- 2023: Levadiakos
- 2023–2025: Panetolikos
- * Club domestic league appearances and goals

Giannis Petrakis (Greek: Γιάννης Πετράκης; born 20 May 1959) is a Greek professional football manager and former player.

== Playing career ==
Petrakis began his football career with his local side Asteras Perama, before moving to Heraklion and Ergotelis in 1978. In 1981 Petrakis moved to local rival OFI, playing in the Alpha Ethniki, the top level football league in Greece before returning to a Gamma Ethniki side Ergotelis in 1985, where he reached the 1985–86 Greek Cup quarterfinals. In 1988, he returned to his hometown Rethymno to play for EAR Rethymnou, before ending his career with Heraklion-based Poseidon, with whom he won his only title, the 1990–91 Delta Ethniki championship.

== Managerial career ==
Petrakis began his coaching career in 1991 at Asteras Perama. He took over Ergotelis in 1992, before returning to Asteras Perama in 1994. Up next in 1997, Petrakis was hired by Heraklion-based club Irodotos, whom he promoted to the Gamma Ethniki, the third tier of the Greek football league system. He then took over management of Malia local club PANO Malia, whom he promoted to the Delta Ethniki (the fourth tier of the Greek football league system) for the first time in their history and managed to win the Greek Football Amateur Cup in 2000. He then managed to also promote the amateur department of OFI, OFI 94 to the Delta Ethniki, and was manager from 2000 until 2002, when the club appointed him assistant to OFI's head coach Zdeněk Ščasný. In 2003, Petrakis returned to Irodotos, and managed to promote the club to the Gamma Ethniki once again.

In 2004, Petrakis left Crete for the first time in his career, taking over management of Arcadian club Asteras Tripolis, whom he also promoted to the Gamma Ethniki. He then returned to Rethymno and led local club Asteras Rethymno to the Gamma Ethniki as well. Petrakis went on to coach Nea Ionia (2009–2010), Ionikos (2010–2011) and Chania (2011–2012), before returning, and being appointed head coach of OFI on 7 January 2013, where he made his debut as a Super League manager. Petrakis coached the club in 15 matches, managing to avoid relegation, and terminated his contract with the club at the end of the season on mutual consent.

In the summer of 2013, Petrakis was hired as head coach of the other local Super League side Ergotelis. The season took off with an impressive start, in which the club remained undefeated for 8 consecutive matches (the best undefeated record in the club's history in the league). At the end of October however, Ergotelis began struggling, and as a result, the club's board of directors decided to replace Petrakis on 14 January 2014.

=== PAS Giannina ===
Fourteen days later, on 28 January 2014, Petrakis was hired by Epirus-based Super League club PAS Giannina. Petrakis managed avoid relegation at the end of the season, and subsequently went on to secure a 6th-place finish in the 2014–15 and 2015–16, thus leading PAS Giannina to their first ever UEFA Europa League campaign. For this feat, Petrakis was named "Best Manager in Greece" for the 2014–2015 season. Further contributing to the club's history, Petrakis managed to advance PAS Giannina to the Third qualifying round of the competition, after eliminating Norwegian club Odd 4–3 on aggregate. He was a candidate for "Best Manager in Greece" for the 2015–2016 season but he didn't voted again. His contract was not renewed because PAS Giannina were relegated from Super League.

== Honours ==
=== As a manager ===
Asteras Rethymno

- Championship Delta Ethniki: 2007
- Championships at A'Local League of Rethymno: 2009
- Rethymno Cups: 2006
- Rethymno Super Cups: 2006

Asteras Tripolis

- Gamma Ethniki: 2005–06
- Delta Ethniki: 2004–05

Apollon Limassol

- Cypriot First Division: Runners-up 2020–21

Individual

- Best Manager in Greece: 2014–15 with PAS Giannina
