= Ergotelis F.C. =

Greek professional association football club in Heraklion, Crete

Ergotelis
- Full name: Γυμναστικός Σύλλογος «Ο Εργοτέλης» Ηρακλείου Κρήτης; Gymnastikós Sýllogos «Ó Ergotélis» Iraklíou Krítis (Gymnastics Club «Ergotelis» Heraklion Crete)
- Nickname: ĺ Kitrinómavri (The Yellow-Blacks)
- Founded: 7 August 1929; 97 years ago as Athlitikí Énosis «Ó Ergotélis»
- Ground: Gazi Municipal Ground
- Capacity: 700
- Owner: Parent Club
- President: Thomas Gavalas
- Manager: Manolis Soutzis
- League: Gamma Ethniki
- 2025–26: Heraklion FCA First Division, 1st (promoted)
- Website: www.ergotelis.gr
Home colours	Away colours

Ergotelis Football Club (Greek: Π.Α.Ε. Εργοτέλης) is a Greek professional football club based in Heraklion, Crete, which competes in the Gamma Ethniki, the third tier of the Greek football league system, and hosts its home games at the Pankritio Stadium. Established in 1929 and named after the ancient Cretan Olympic runner, it is part of Gymnastics Club Ergotelis (Greek: Γ.Σ. Εργοτέλης).

Ergotelis is one of the two Heraklion-based football clubs to have competed in the Greek Super League, the country's top-level football competition, having made a total of 9 appearances during 2004–2015. The club's best finish in the competition is 7th place during the 2013–14 season. It has also won the Beta Ethniki (second tier of the Greek football league system) once, in 2006, as well as the Greek Amateur Cup in 1983. Its traditional colors are yellow and black.

== History ==
=== Early years ===
Ergotelis was established as an amateur club of Cretan footballers in 1929 by prominent Heraklion citizens, mainly refugees from Asia Minor. The club's foundation, as well as its first ever recorded game, a friendly 4–0 win against local side Leon (Greek: Λέων) held at Chandax (Greek: Χάνδαξ) stadium on 4 August 1929, was reported onto local newspaper 'Eleythera Skepsis' (Greek: Ελευθέρα Σκέψις) on Wednesday, 7 August 1929. Since its early days, Ergotelis showed the progressive ideals of its founders, being one of the first sports clubs in Greece to allow women into its sporting divisions, as well as its board of directors. The club temporarily shut down in 1935, following the involvement of its leading executives in political movements of the time. Ergotelis was re-established in 1937, developing a remarkable athletics department along with a strong football team, that went on to place 1st in the 1940 Heraklion Football Clubs Association Championship, which was never finished due to World War II.

After the war, the club emerged as the most powerful competitor to regular Heraklion Football Clubs Association champions OFI, shaping up a new football and social rivalry in local sport. Ergotelis eventually gained its own football ground in 1946, the Ergotelis Stadium (also known as Martinengo Stadium, after the Martinengo Bastion), located on the Venetian Era walls surrounding the city's center, and would mostly play in Heraklion's local championship and Greece's national Second Division, after the latter was founded in the early 1960s. Ergotelis actually came close to achieve a historic promotion to the First Division during the very first Beta Ethniki season held in 1960, finishing 3rd in the Southern Group, just 4 points behind Group Champions Atromitos Piraeus. The club was demoted to the newly established Gamma Ethniki in 1964−65 after finishing 9th in Group 2, and subsequently won the Group 1 Gamma Ethniki championship in 1966, the club's first ever national honour, to top off instant re-promotion to the Beta Ethniki.

=== Junta years, Theodorakis concert and repercussions (1966–1974) ===
Ergotelis' squad in the 1966−67 Beta Ethniki season.

During the Greek military junta of 1967–1974, Ergotelis was 'branded' as an unpatriotic organization, and its officials were accused for «deviating from the purposes for which they were elected, turning the club into an instrument servicing political, and sometimes unpatriotic objectives», after the club's board of directors allowed renowned songwriter and composer Mikis Theodorakis, a key voice against the right-wing government, to perform a concert on Martinengo stadium. After the conclusion of the 1966–1967 Beta Ethniki season, the club was forcibly relegated to amateur status through a legislation, that allowed each regional city of Greece to be represented in the country's Second national Division by a single team only. Furthermore, to add insult to injury, any local clubs remaining in the Beta Ethniki had the right to demand the transfer of any number of players from the relegated clubs, bypassing official transfer regulations. As a result, five of Ergotelis' best considered players at the time (Konstantinos Theodorakis, Dimitrios Papadopoulos, Manolis Stavroulakis, Konstantinos Zouraris and Georgios Skandalakis), were signed by local rival OFI – who remained in the national competitions. Shortly after, a court decision in favor of Ergotelis was overruled by the junta-controlled Hellenic Football Federation, which finally approved OFI's contracts with the players and threatened Ergotelis officials with eviction from their home turf in Martinengo Stadium. After members of the club's board of directors were either demoted or prosecuted, Ergotelis was practically dismantled in 1967. The club made a brief comeback to the Second Division after winning the 1969−70 local Heraklion Championship, but the weakened roster and administration were too inexperienced to be competitive, and the club was therefore instantly relegated at the end of the 1970−71 season, after finishing in last place.

=== Post-Junta period and the 80s sporadic breakthroughs (1974–1999) ===
After the junta's collapse in 1974, several attempts were made to bring the team back to Greek football reality, however most of these were met with failure. As a result, Ergotelis struggled between the lower regional and national competitions for over 30 years. Ergotelis managed not to go completely unnoticed during these years however, achieving some notable breakthroughs in the 80s, along the way to a rebirth.

During the 1982–83 season, the club won the Greek Football Amateur Cup, by defeating AO Arta 2–0 in the competition final held at the Leoforos Alexandras Stadium, thus becoming the first Cretan club to win the competition. The 1984–85 season saw the club finishing at the top of the Delta Ethniki Group 1 table to promote to the Gamma Ethniki as champions. However the most notable feat of this period came during the 1985–86 season, when Ergotelis, at the time playing in the Gamma Ethniki, managed to reach the Greek Cup quarterfinals, which would remain the best performance of the club in the competition for 33 years. Being the sole representative of the Gamma Ethniki still remaining in the competition, Ergotelis consecutively eliminated Niki Volos, Alpha Ethniki side Panserraikos and Olympiacos Volos to reach the quarterfinals, where the club squared off against eventual title winners Panathinaikos. Though giving the "Greens" a tough match to eventually go down 2–3 in the first leg held at the Theodoros Vardinogiannis Stadium in Heraklion, Ergotelis were completely dominated in the second leg, where they lost to the eventual Greek champions with an emphatic 7–1 score at the Leoforos Alexandras Stadium on 9 April 1986. This feat marked the end of Ergotelis' attempts at a return during this period, as the club was relegated back to the Delta Ethniki two years later, at the end of the 1987–88 season.

Ergotelis briefly resurfaced in the mid-90s, spending two consecutive seasons in the Gamma Ethniki during 1996–98, after winning the Delta Ethniki 1995–96 Group 2 championship. It would then take another 5 years for the club to re-emerge, and this time complete a full comeback.

=== Rebirth and rise to top-flight (1999–2006) ===

Ergotelis lineup May 30, 2004 (3–5–2)

In the late 90s Ergotelis' came under the ownership of veteran football directors Georgios Soultatos and Nikos Tzortzoglou, who took over the club for the third time after two relatively successful tenures during the 90s. Learning from past experience, careful transfers of promising players from the Cretan market were made, while an emphasis was placed on the development and growth of the club's infrastructure, leading up to the establishment of the Ergotelis Youth Academy at Martinengo Stadium. Within a couple of years, Ergotelis grew into a strong, competitive team composed mostly of Cretan players, that would celebrate three consecutive promotions from the 4th Division to reach the Alpha Ethniki, the highest professional football league in Greece for the first time in club history.

In 2001, the Soultatos−Tzortzoglou duo appointed Cretan manager and former OFI legendary goalkeeper Myron Sifakis as club manager, a position he would retain for the next three-and-a-half years. After managing promotion to the Gamma Ethniki in 2002, the club signed Nigerian striker Patrick Ogunsoto, who eventually developed into the club's all-time top-scorer. The professional football department of Ergotelis was established the same year, as a requirement for the club being eligible to play in the Gamma Ethniki. Despite being newcomers, Ergotelis finished second in the 2002−03 Gamma Ethniki season, boasting a remarkable 80 points on the League Table and winning every single home game played at Martinengo Stadium that season. Ogunsoto personally scored 30 goals in 32 games, with emblematic team captain Stavros Labrakis adding in another 12, both significantly contributing to the club's triumphant return to the Beta Ethniki after a 31-year absence.

In the following season, Ergotelis participated in the Beta Ethniki, once again leveraging on a string of strong home game performances (eleven wins, three draws and only one loss), backed by a fierce support of the club's fans. The club came in third with 55 points in the Beta Ethniki, earning a chance at promotion in a single promotion play-off match against the club that would finish 14th in the 2003–04 Alpha Ethniki season. On May 30, 2004, Ergotelis won that match, defeating Athenian club Akratitos 1−0 at the neutral Makedonikos Stadium in Thessaloniki in front of a cheering crowd of 2,000 fans travelling from various corners of the country, thanks to an injury time goal by Jean Marie Sylla. The club thus became the second team to have represented Heraklion in the highest professional football league in Greece, alongside club rival OFI. Hundreds of Ergotelis supporters took to the streets that night in celebrations, escorting the victors' bus from the Heraklion International Airport to Martinengo Stadium. Ergotelis' promotion coincided with the completion of the Pankritio Stadium for the 2004 Summer Olympics, and due to the stricter regulations for football venues in the Alpha Ethniki, the team left Martinengo Stadium and moved to the Pankritio, which still remains the club's home ground to this day.

On the sidelines, the club took full advantage of the new stadium during its debut season in the Alpha Ethniki, attracting fans from all over Crete and earning recognition by both the Greek state and Hellenic Football Federation. As a result, the club broke several attendance records, including setting the Pankritio Stadium's sold-out record on 20 February 2005, during a Super League 2−1 home win against reigning champions Olympiacos. On the pitch however, the club's lack of experience led to an underwhelming league performance. Despite achieving notable wins against Greek giants Olympiacos and PAOK, Ergotelis failed to avoid relegation and eventually finished in 15th place having just 5 wins, 5 draws and 20 losses. Patrick Ogunsoto produced 11 out of a total 19 goals scored by Ergotelis during the season, in which the club also terminated its contract with Myron Sifakis after controversial remarks following a 0−1 home loss vs. his former playing club OFI. The following year however, after overcoming a rough start to the 2005–06 season, Ergotelis returned to good form after Greek manager Nikos Karageorgiou took over in mid-season, achieving instant promotion back to top-flight and winning its first-ever Beta Ethniki title. The club spent the season undefeated at home (11 wins, 4 draws), while also managing to impress crowds once again with their performance in the Greek Football Cup, where they managed to eliminate Greek giants Panathinaikos. Once again, Ogunsoto led the club in scoring with 21 goals, earning himself a transfer abroad to Belgian First Division side Westerlo.

=== Super League tenure and Papoutsakis' era (2006–2012) ===
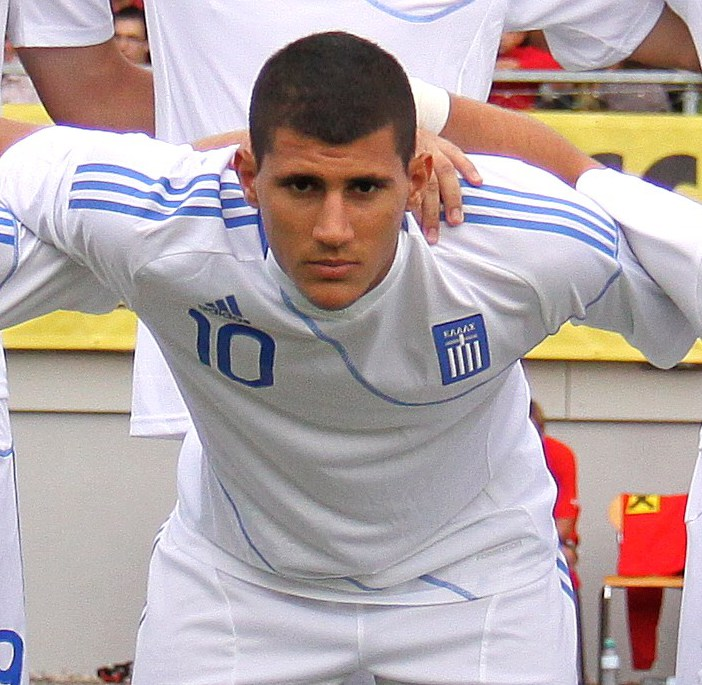
Nikos Karelis promoted from youth squad in 2008.

Ergotelis second promotion coincided with the founding of the Super League Greece, a modern continuation of the previous Alpha Ethniki, now under the supervision of the Super League coalition of participating clubs. Ergotelis' squad for the 2006–07 Super League season was bolstered with quality players in all positions, such as former Real Madrid forward Perica Ognjenović, Austrian international centre-back Mario Hieblinger and Brazilian midfielder Silva Júnior, many of whom stayed at the club for many years, forming a competitive team that spent several consecutive seasons in top-flight. The club was again recognized by Greek state officials for its organization of innovative actions and initiatives during the season, as well as its ethos and fair play spirit. On the pitch, Ergotelis secured a 9th-place finish with 39 points on the League Table, maintaining a strong home game performance (7 wins, 4 draws and 4 losses), and managing 4 additional Away wins, most notably vs. Panathinaikos and local rival OFI. In January 2008, Ergotelis came under the ownership of then club vice-president and prominent businessman Apostolos Papoutsakis, who put forward an ambitious investment plan to keep the club in top flight. During Papoutsakis' presidency, the club rose to prestigious standards in Greek football, which eventually earned Ergotelis consecutive Fair Play awards, for the 2008–09 and 2009–10 seasons. Nikos Karageorgiou remained manager of the club for six consecutive seasons, in which the club saw a steady financial growth, mainly due to the transfers of promising young Greek players Dimitrios Kiliaras and Vasilios Koutsianikoulis to prestigious clubs Panionios and PAOK respectively. Prior to these feats however, the club had to overcome a difficult transition period. Coping with the change in leadership, Ergotelis finished a turbulent 2007–08 season, barely avoiding relegation on the final match day thanks to a combination of league results, which allowed the club to capitalize on its 2–0 home win vs. Xanthi in front of 10,000 cheering fans. Club legend Patrick Ogunsoto returned to Ergotelis in mid season to assist in this feat with 6 goals, helping the club reach a 13th-place finish, boasting just 7 wins, 9 draws and 14 losses.

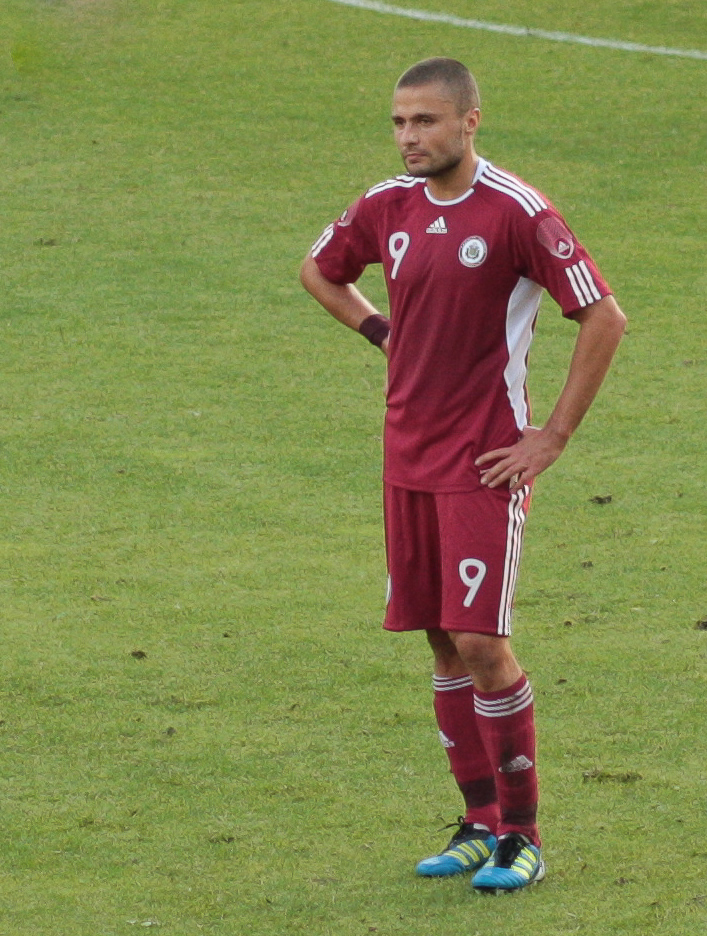
Māris Verpakovskis

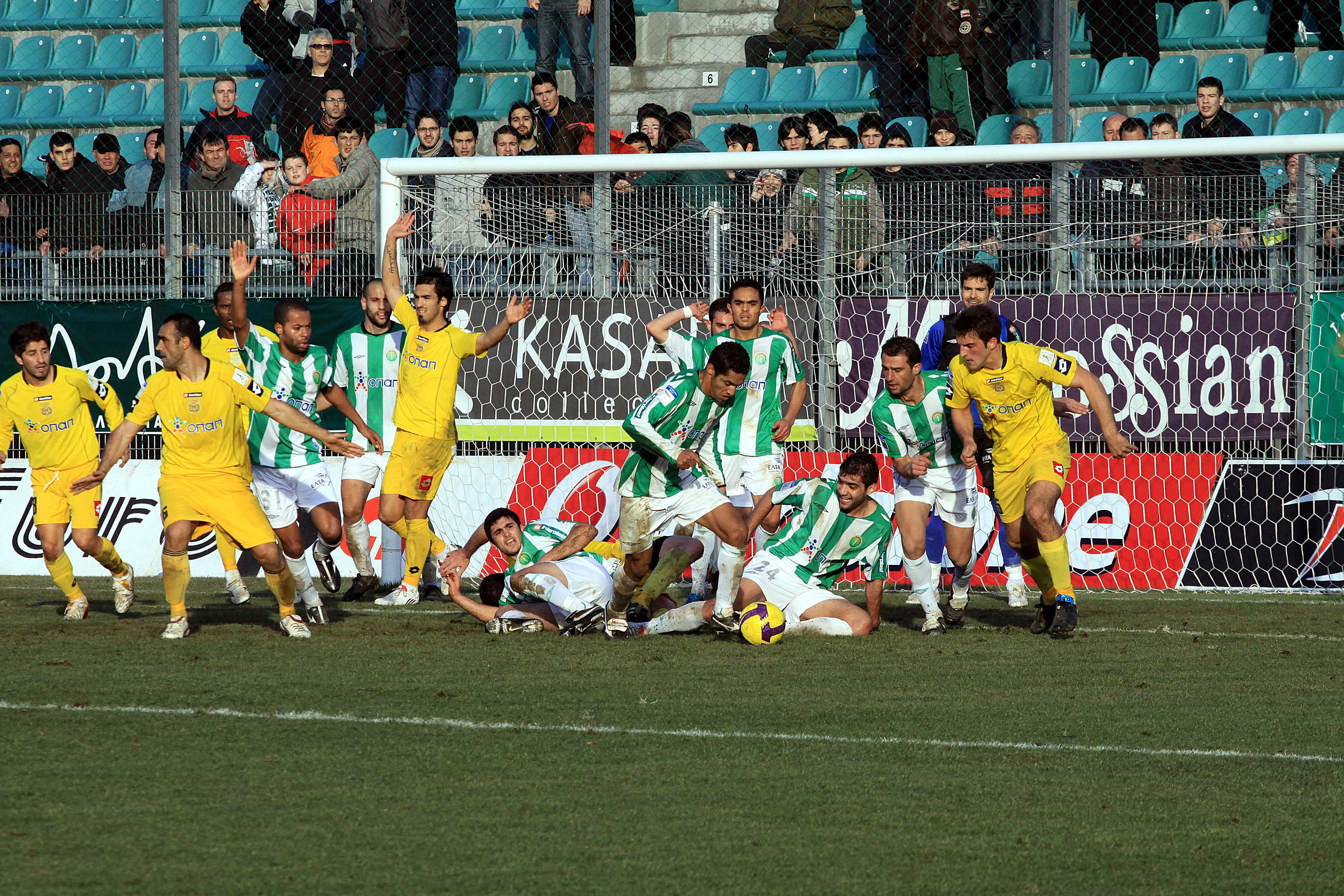
Ergotelis vs. Panthrakikos during the 2009–10 season.

During the 2008–09 season, Ergotelis achieved memorable wins against Greece's traditional football giants Panathinaikos and Olympiacos, including a 2–3 away competition win in the Athens Olympic Stadium against Panathinaikos on October 29, 2008. Capitalizing on strong performances away from home, along with a mediocre home record, the club tied its best league performance, finishing in 9th place. Most notably, Ergotelis became the sole club to represent Heraklion in top tier, following club rival OFI's relegation at the end of the season. The 2009–10 season was dedicated to Ergotelis' 80th anniversary, in which the club issued a special anniversary logo and completed impressive transfers, most notably bringing in Latvia's all-time top scorer Māris Verpakovskis. Moreover, Ergotelis organized a series of social and beneficial activities, and fittingly commemorated its anniversary with a stunning 5–0 thrashing of reigning champions Olympiacos in a friendly game held at Pankritio Stadium on September 6, 2009. The club's League performance fell short of expectations however, as Ergotelis finished in 11th place, stressfully securing their place in top flight with two consecutive wins during the final two match days. Next season saw the club reach its most notable achievement of this period, securing an 8th-place finish in the 2010–11 season. Outside the pitch, the club's board of directors would gain praise from the media for its initiative to sign international partnerships with Dutch side FC Utrecht and State-side Philadelphia Union. Social and beneficial activities organized by the club during this period culminated in a concert held at Pankritio Stadium on September 19, 2011, honoring Mikis Theodorakis in commemoration of the 45 years passed since the controversial concert at Martinengo Stadium in 1966.

For the 2011–12 season, the club's board of directors decided to cut down the team's budget, a direct result of the Greek economic crisis of the late 2000s. While the season took off on a promising start, subsequent weak performances, along with rising tensions between several of the club's players and the manager, ultimately failed to keep Ergotelis in top-flight. The team was relegated in the end of the season, after a disastrous second round which saw the club win only 2 of the total 15 matches, and thus return to the 2nd tier (which had been renamed as the Football League) after finishing in 14th place. To further add to the fans' pain, club president Papoutsakis died on July 23, 2012, at the age of 60.

=== Financial struggles, meltdown and Gamma Ethniki restart (2012–2017) ===
The next season saw Ergotelis go through a major overhaul on all fronts. Nikos Karageorgiou terminated his contract on mutual consent after six years of service, and former renowned Cypriot striker Siniša Gogić took over as manager of the team. The roster was rebuilt with youngsters from the club's training academies, as most of the club's veterans were either released, or refused to follow the team in the lower division. During mid-season, the club experienced financial instability after major shareholders announced they were stepping down. Despite these facts however, Ergotelis managed to secure a second-place finish in the 2012–13 Football League marathon procedure, with 22 wins, 9 draws and 9 losses, thus celebrating a third promotion to the Super League. Ergotelis' third tenure in top-flight would prove to be short-lived however.

Ergotelis' first season in top-flight after re-promotion was nothing short of impressive for club standards. The 2013–14 season saw Ergotelis achieve its best finish in the Super League. Boasting an all-time best 44 points, Ergotelis finished in 7th place, tied with 6th-place OFI as both had 11 wins, 11 draws and 12 losses at the end of the season. The club's impressive good form was disrupted in the following season however, as continuous managerial changes, an abundance of unfortunate and costly player transfers, multiple matches being postponed in mid-season and competitors withdrawing from the league due to financial reasons, led to a 16th-place finish during the regular Super League season. The club ultimately was placed in 15th place post-season, after Kerkyra was relegated for illegal transfer of shares, and were penalized to the last position of the league table.

The next season turned out to be one of the most difficult in the club's recent history, as there were many open issues regarding which competition the club would be participating in at the start of the season. Open legal issues with Super League clubs Kerkyra and Veria left the relegation status of Ergotelis ambiguous, as club officials made a final effort for the club to remain in top-flight by taking both cases in court. After both cases resolved, and left Ergotelis relegated, there was much speculation on whether the club would follow in the footsteps of clubs such as AEK Athens, Larissa and local rival OFI, who chose to dissolve and voluntarily play in the Gamma Ethniki in an attempt to start anew and clear their financial debts. Despite the unbearable financial obligations tied to the decision to keep playing in the Football League, Ergotelis' major shareholder and son of the late Apostolos Papoutsakis Dimitrios, took the decision to keep the club in professional level and attempt a fourth promotion to the Super League, gathering past board members and financiers under one banner. The club hired Bosnian manager Jasminko Velić and began preparations for the Football League almost a month after the season was officially declared started. Despite high hopes however, the club soon fell behind in the League table, while its financial status worsened. As players started filing claims against the club in the winter transfer window of 2016, thus releasing themselves of their contracts due to unpaid wages, Papoutsakis announced his resignation as club president. The remaining board members along with a group of 17 players who refused to let the team die, managed to keep the club running until 19 January 2016, when club officials finally decided to withdraw the team from the competition. After 14 consecutive years playing in professional divisions, Ergotelis was once again relegated to amateur status.

After its withdrawal from professional competitions, the football department of Ergotelis reinstated its amateur status, thus merging with the parent multi-sport club, Gymnastics Club Ergotelis. The latter's officials decided that the Football Club should thus be dissolved and enter into liquidation, a process that would allow Ergotelis to compete in amateur competitions under new leadership, free of the financial obligations of the previous administration. The decision was fiercely rivaled by major shareholder Papoutsakis, who instead opted for liquidation without dismantling the company, in operation under the provisions of the bankruptcy code. After the Gymnastics Club's administration reached out on the matter to the Deputy Minister for Sport Stavros Kontonis, joined by fellow Football League withdrawn competitors Olympiacos Volos, elections were held in April 2016 appointing Georgios Vrentzos as the new president of the Gymnastics Club, and head of all its football departments. After the Hellenic Football Federation, the Greek Professional Sports Commission and the Greek Ministry of Development all ruled in favor of the Gymnastics Club case and reassured its officials that the club would compete in the Gamma Ethniki, the third tier of the Greek football league system, the club's new administration was free to open up winding-up proceedings and appoint liquidators, while at the same time rebuilding the football department and attempt a swift return to professional competitions. As the club brought in former Ergotelis stars such as Sergio Leal and Nikolaos Katsikokeris to lead the effort on the pitch and filled the roster with veteran Football League players, the new administration's project eventually paid off. Ergotelis finished at the top of the 2016–17 Gamma Ethniki Group 4 Table, thus managing instant promotion back to pro-level competitions. After celebrations on securing the Division title ended, club president Vrentzos announced he could no longer financially support the football club on his own and that he had initiated talks with external parties to secure the required funds to form a new Ergotelis professional Football Club department, eligible to compete in the Football League. Eventually, after a full week of negotiations during the end of July 2017, and with Georgios Vrentzos set to retire, the club's General Assembly agreed to transfer the ownership of Ergotelis' professional football department to Egyptian businessman Maged Samy, owner of Egyptian Premier League club Wadi Degla and Belgian B Division side Lierse S.K.

=== Maged Samy era (2017–2022) ===
For the first season in the Football League under Samy's presidency, Ergotelis boasted a youthful team led by controversial Greek manager Takis Gonias. After an experimental First Round, Ergotelis' squad significantly improved and maintained an impressive good form, winning several key matches, scoring many goals, maintaining ball possession rates close to 60%-70% and eventually battling their way out of the relegation zone, finishing in 9th place. Following the departure of Gonias for Wadi Degla at the end of the season, and his replacement with Cypriot manager Nikki Papavasiliou, Ergotelis impressed with their performance in the Greek Cup, where they managed to advance to the Round of 16 despite being drawn in the same group with Super League powerhouses PAOK and Aris. They went on to eliminate local Super League rival OFI in the knock-out phase to eventually make it to the quarter-finals for the first time since 1986, matching the club's best-ever performance in the competition. In the Football League, Ergotelis narrowly missed out on the chance to play in a promotion play-off match, finishing 4 points behind second place. However, they were eventually deducted three points for failing the economic oversight process requirements of the HFF, and thus finished in 4th place, securing its participation in the newly established Super League 2. Next year however, saw the sudden departure of Papavasiliou to take over Super League side Panionios right before the start of the season, with manager Giannis Taousianis taking over. In a season that was cut short due to the COVID-19 pandemic, Ergotelis failed to repeat their previous year's performance, eventually finishing in seventh place with 29 points.

The next season, Ergotelis came the closest to returning to the Super League, literally missing out on promotion as champions in the final match of the season. After overcoming a slow start with two losses in the first two games, Ergotelis impressed with performances during the First round of the tournament, where the team went 7-1-0 over the next 8 games. After a sluggish start to the Second round, Ergotelis entered the Promotion Play-offs in 4th place. The club won all its playoffs matches against fellow promotion contenders, until eventually going down 2−1 vs. eventual Division Champion Ionikos in the final match of the season, thus finishing in 4th place. The game raised much controversy due to the presence of Ionikos fans at Neapoli Stadium despite lockdown regulations, as well as questionable decisions by referee Vasilios Fotias late in the game.

=== Return to Local Leagues (2022–2026) ===
On 29 September 2022, Ergotelis officially withdrew from the national leagues, as the club was unable to meet the financial and competitive demands of the Super League 2 and Gamma Ethniki. The departure of majority owner Maged Samy, who relinquished his shares, created significant issues, and the club passed into the hands of the amateur club Ergotelis. The club decided to take a "big step back to take more steps forward," focusing on its youth teams and restructuring the football department on solid foundations.

After evaluating the available options for the division in which the men's team would compete, Ergotelis decided to participate in the Heraklion FCA First Division, the top local division in Heraklion, for the 2022–23 season. This decision was approved by the Hellenic Football Federation, and the club became the 17th team to participate in the league, prompting the local association to hold a new draw.

Ergotelis’ return to the local leagues marked its first participation in the Heraklion FCA in 46 years, with the aim of rebuilding and returning to the national leagues as soon as possible.

In the 2025–26 season, Ergotelis won the Heraklion FCA championship for the 8th time in its history, earning promotion back to the national divisions after 4 years.

== Crest and colours ==
Ergotelis first logo survives from the historical document of the club's establishment, and depicts a runner surrounded by a laurel wreath, similar to the ones awarded to the ancient Olympic Games victors. The club's colours, yellow and black were chosen due to their prominent featuring in Minoan civilization. Early photographs of Ergotelis' football department and fans depict an alternate club logo, simply the letter E possibly framed within a circle. In recent years, Ergotelis' emblem evolved to depict a football player wearing the club's traditional colors (yellow and black). The football player, possibly a reference to Ergotelis' original establishment as a football club, honors the athlete in general, while the Olympic crown is a reference to the Olympic champion Ergoteles of Himera, whom the club is named after. Since the early 2000s, the club's logo is framed within a yellow shield.

Multiple versions of the club's latter logo have been issued, primarily for sponsorship reasons. For instance, during the 2006–07 season and up until the 2013–14 season, Ergotelis' crest included its major sponsor's title "DIETHNIS ENOSIS". (Greek: «ΔΙΕΘΝΗΣ ΕΝΩΣΙΣ»). In 2009, the club issued an anniversary logo, which used a slightly darker palette and featured a smaller version of the laurel wreath and athlete, framed within a golden 80, part of the phrase "80 ΧΡΟΝΙΑ 1929–2009" (English: "80 YEARS 1929–2009").

For the club's 90th anniversary in 2019, all G.S. Ergotelis departments were issued an anniversary logo, inspired by the 1929 original, as depicted in club documents at that time. Due to the overwhelmingly positive reception the logo gained by both fans and club officials, this logo became permanent in 2020, replacing the commemorative "90" graphic behind the runner with the club's foundation date "1929".

=== Logos ===
1929 (original)

2000–2004 (variations)

2004–2019 (variations)

=== Anniversary logos ===
80th Anniversary (2009)

90th Anniversary (2019)

=== Kit evolution ===
Ergotelis' original home colours. Variations of this basic kit have been used throughout the 1950s and 60s.

As previously mentioned, the team's jersey colours are yellow and black. Early kits resembled the kit depicted in the club's crest, with black shorts and a yellow shirt, while black stripes and variations thereof were introduced in later years. Ergotelis' kits during the club's first seasons in the Super League were supplied by French company Le Coq Sportif. Afterwards, the team signed a contract with Italian company Lotto, which resulted in several iconic kits that in some cases have been re-used throughout multiple seasons. Ergotelis' partnership with Lotto was interrupted during the 2011–12 season in which the club wore kits produced by Macron. In 2013, Ergotelis started a two-year partnership deal with fellow Italian company Eye Sportwear, which designed and produced two custom kits, one for each of the 2013–14 and 2014–15 seasons, both patented by Ergotelis. In the summer of 2018, the club announced a three-year sponsor partnership with American sports manufacturing company Capelli Sport.

=== Manufacturers and shirt sponsors ===
Period	Kit manufacturer	Shirt sponsor
2001–2002	Kelme	Cava Protypo
2002−2003	Puma	No sponsor
2003–2004	Le Coq Sportif	Piraeus Bank
2004–2005	Le Coq Sportif	Almaco Aluminium
2005–2006	Admiral	Almaco Aluminium
2006–2007	Le Coq Sportif	OPAP
2007–2008	Lotto	Diethnis Enosis
2008–2009	Lotto	OPAP
2009–2011	Lotto	Lotto
2011–2012	Macron	Lotto
2012–2013	Lotto	Lotto
2013–2015	Eye	Lotto
2015–2016	Macron	Pame Stoixima
2016–2017	Lotto	No sponsor
2017–2018	Lotto	Be My Hero
2018−	Capelli	No sponsor

Current sponsorships

- Great Shirt Sponsor: N/A
- Official Sport Clothing Manufacturer: Capelli
- Official Sponsors: Vitex, Fresh Snack, imonline, Zaro's, Karatarakis Hotels and Restaurants, Gresko Inc.

== Stadiums and facilities ==
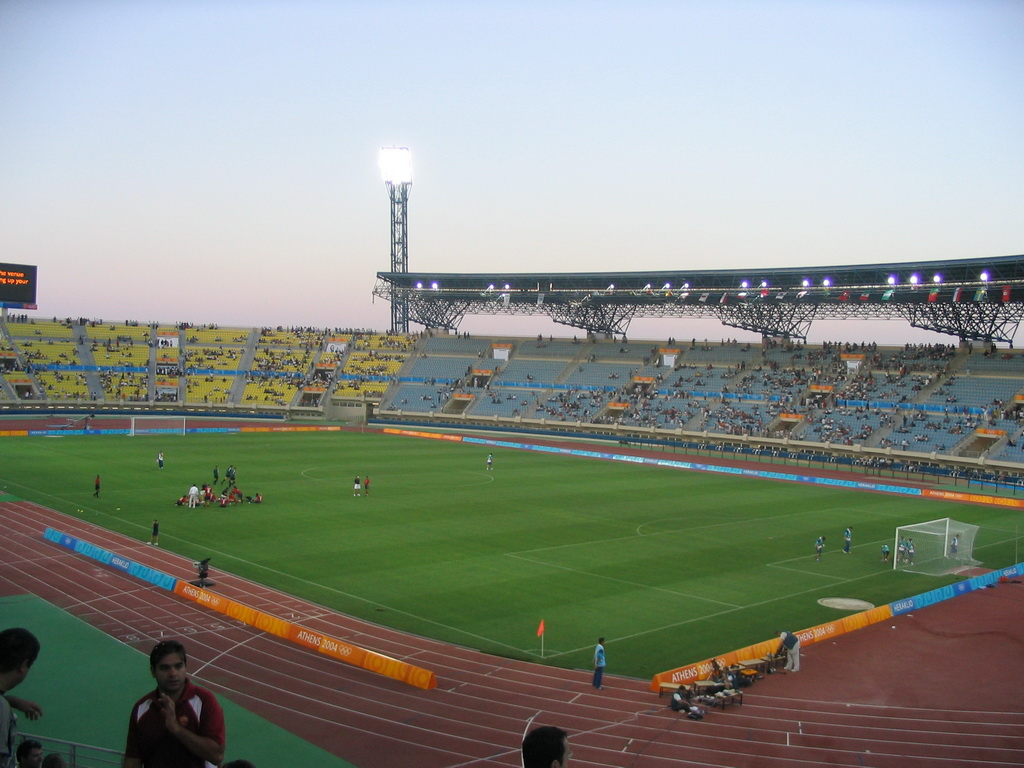
Pankritio Stadium

Ergotelis' traditional home ground is the Nikos Kazantzakis Stadium, previously known as Ergotelis Stadium or "Martinengo Stadium", located on the Venetian-era fortifications surrounding the city of Heraklion. Built in 1946, Martinengo Stadium has been used as the home ground of multiple Heraklion amateur football clubs, and currently hosts Ergotelis' football academies, the largest training academies center on the island, and one of the largest training centers in Greece. The stadium has been used by Ergotelis during the club's tenure in lower amateur and regional competitions until the club's promotion to the Alpha Ethniki in 2004, and has also been the stage of a controversial Mikis Theodorakis concert on 6 August 1966, which many hold as the foremost reason for Ergotelis' eventual disbandment by the ruling military junta in 1967.

As Martinengo Stadium was not fit for use in Alpha Ethniki matches, Ergotelis' home ground was relocated to the newly built Pankritio Stadium in 2004, with local rival OFI's neighboring Theodoros Vardinogiannis Stadium being declared the club's alternate home ground. During its first season in the competition, Ergotelis averaged almost 10,000 supporters during home games, and consequently set the Pankritio Stadium's attendance record on 20 February 2005, in a 2−1 Super League victory over reigning champions Olympiacos with 27,950 tickets being sold-out. Over the years however, attendances dropped significantly, limiting Ergotelis to a small, yet fiercely loyal fanbase.

Stadium	Capacity	Years
Nikos Kazantzakis Stadium	1,000 (~600 seated)	1946–2004, 2022–
Pankritio Stadium	26,240	2004–2022

== Supporters ==
Ergotelis' core fanbase is currently organized into two supporters' unions, namely the Daltons Club and the Alternatives Fans of Ergotelis. They both attend Ergotelis' home games, usually occupying the Pankritio Stadium's Gate 19.

== Rivalry with OFI ==
The two Super League clubs based in Heraklion, Ergotelis and OFI, maintain a rivalry that can be traced back to socio-political roots. Characteristic of this animosity, the first ever game between the two teams, a friendly match in 1929, ended after 35 minutes. Ergotelis were ahead by 1–0, when the game had to be abandoned after violence between the players broke out.

During the Greek military junta of 1967–1974 a government legislation determined that every regional Greek city should be represented in professional divisions by a single football team. At that time, both OFI and Ergotelis used to play in the Second National division, and at the end of the 1966–67 season, had finished in 3rd and 10th place respectively. Despite both clubs having secured their place in next year's edition of the tournament, Ergotelis was relegated to amateur status by law. Furthermore, the teams remaining in the second division were granted the rights to sign any number of players from the relegated clubs, and thus OFI signed contracts with 5 of Ergotelis' best considered players at the time. Ergotelis' side claimed their relegation to be retaliation for allowing renowned left-liberal songwriter and composer Mikis Theodorakis to perform a concert in Martinengo Stadium, giving political dimensions to the already strained relations between the two clubs. In the years to come Ergotelis languished in the lower leagues, while OFI prospered. These facts have led to various controversies among the fans of the two clubs, especially since Ergotelis' come back, at the early 00's.

In recent years, both sides have shown good will in maintaining this rivalry on the pitch only. Furthermore, OFI fans celebrated Ergotelis' promotion and attended home games during the club's first season in the Super League. Ergotelis on the other hand, loaned their longtime scoring legend Patrick Ogunsoto to a financially weakened Beta Ethniki side OFI in 2010 for no fee, as an attempt to assist their prestigious rival in their struggle to once again return to the Super League.

== Titles & honours ==
=== Domestic ===
- Beta Ethniki (2nd National Division)
  - Winners (1): 2005–06
- Gamma Ethniki (3rd National Division)
  - Winners (2): 1965–66, 2016−17
- Delta Ethniki (4th National Division)
  - Winners (2): 1984–85, 1995–96
- FCA Winners' Championship
  - Winners (1): 1970
- Amateur Cup
  - Winners (1): 1982–83

=== Regional ===
- Heraklion FCA Championship
  - Winners (8): 1949−50, 1952–53, 1963−64, 1967–68, 1969–70, 1974–75, 1976–77, 2025–26
- Heraklion FCA Cup
  - Winners (6): 1976–77, 1980–81, 1981–82, 1982–83, 1984–85, 1995–96
- Heraklion FCA Super Cup
  - Winners (1): 2026

== Statistics ==
=== Player records ===
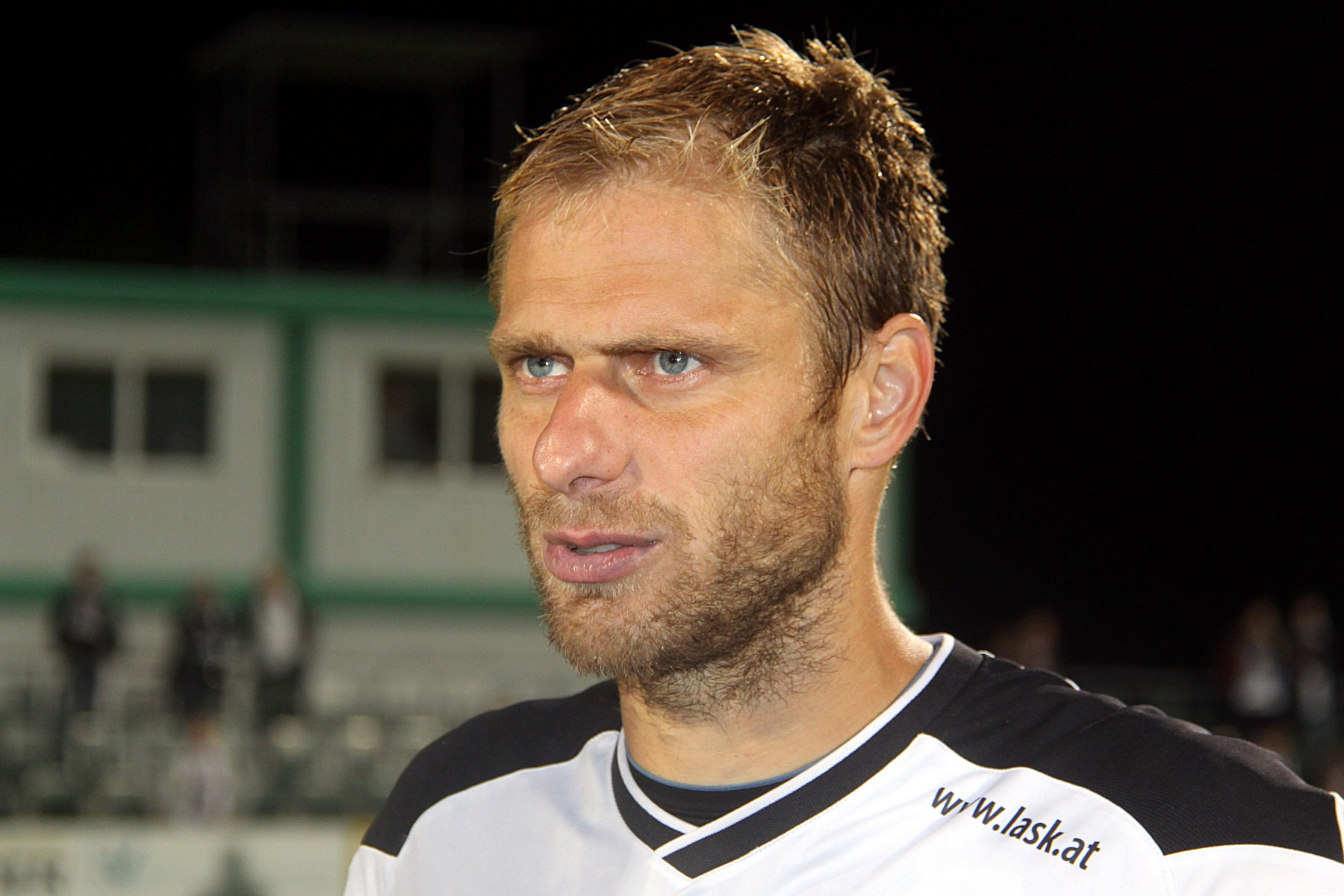
Mario Hieblinger, most capped player for Ergotelis in the Greek Superelague (149).

**League top scorers**

Rank	Player	Nationality	Goals
1	Patrick Ogunsoto	(Nigeria)	85
2	Sergio Leal	(Uruguay)	30
3	Joseph Efford	(United States)	29
4	Nikos Katsikokeris	(Greece)	25
5	Mario Budimir	(Croatia)	24^{1}

**Most appearances**

Rank	Player	Nationality	League Matches	Cup Matches	All Matches
1	Patrick Ogunsoto	(Nigeria)	162	16	**178**
2	Fragkiskos Economakis	(Greece)	140	18	**158**
3	Mario Hieblinger	(Austria)	149^{1}	5	**154**
3	Diego Romano	(Argentina)	149	5	**154**
4	Júnior	(Brazil)	147^{1}	4	**151**

Club appearances and goals counted for domestic Greek professional football leagues. Players indicated in bold are currently active with the club.
1. All in the Super League.

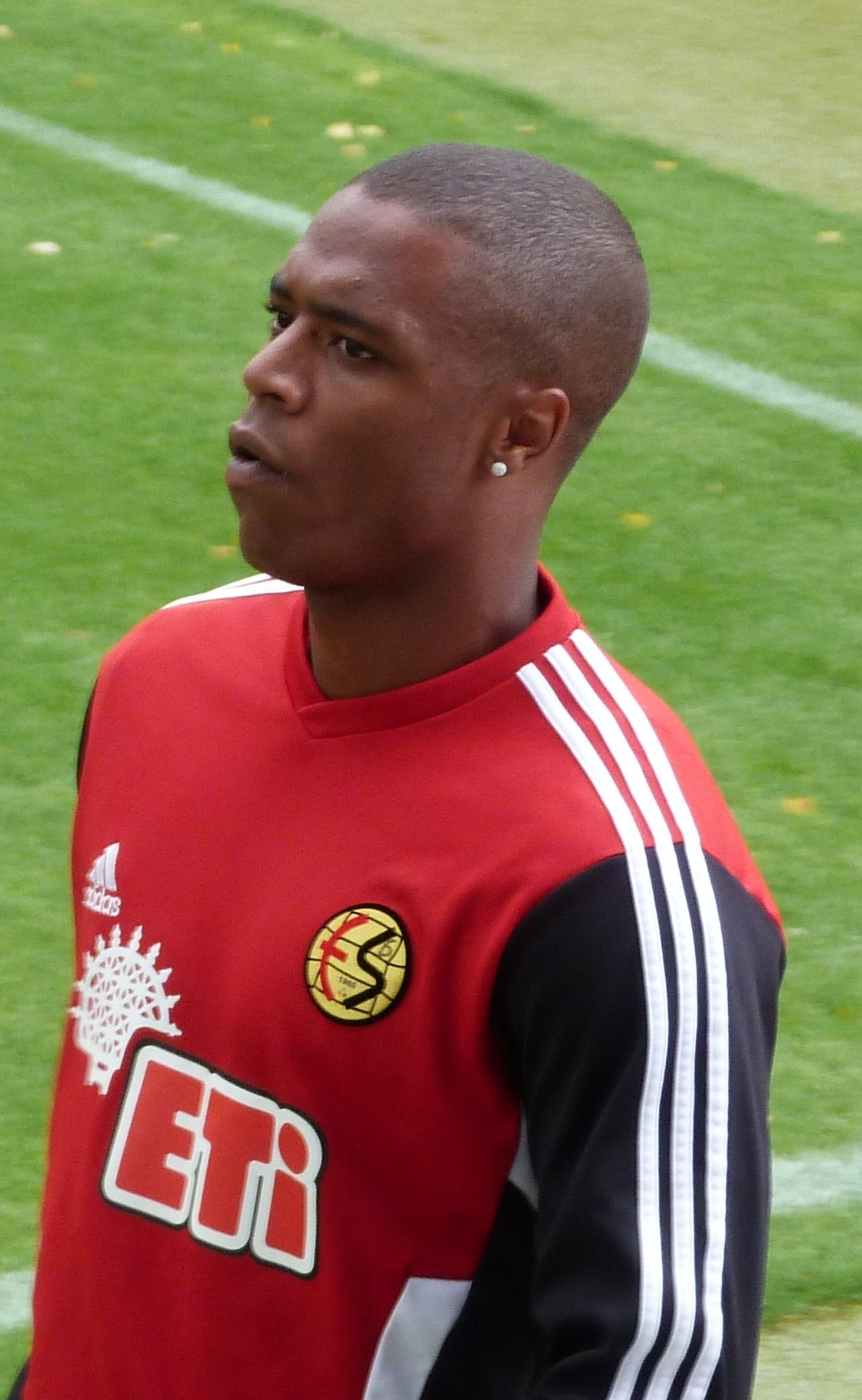
Former Inter Milan midfielder Pelé earned Ergotelis a €500K transfer in just 12 caps.

=== Transfer records ===
Record transfer fees received by Ergotelis
Rank	For	Fee	Received from	Date	Ref
1	(Greece) Vasilios Koutsianikoulis	€1,2m	(Greece) PAOK	26 May 2009	
2	(Greece) Dimitrios Kiliaras	€500k	(Greece) Panionios	16 May 2008	
2	(Portugal) Pelé	€500k	(Greece) Olympiacos	30 December 2013	
3	(Greece) Dimitrios Grammozis	€150k	(Cyprus) Omonia	8 December 2008	
3	(Greece) Nikolaos Katsikokeris	€150k	(Greece) AEK	26 August 2012	
3	(Greece) Andreas Bouchalakis	€150k	(Greece) Olympiacos	13 May 2013	

== Affiliated clubs ==
=== Past affiliations ===
- (Egypt) Wadi Degla
- (Netherlands) FC Utrecht
- (United States) Philadelphia Union
- (Belgium) Lierse S.K.

== Personnel ==
Position	Name
President	(Greece) Thomas Gavalas
Vice-presidents	(Greece) Georgios Polychronakis (Greece) Kostas Giapizoglou (Greece) Georgios Kalogerakis (Greece) Georgios Margaritsanakis
Board Members	(Greece) Dionysios Bovoletis (Greece) Michalis Kaselakis (Greece) Nikos Fantaoutsakis (Greece) Charis Filippakis
General Manager	(Greece) Stavros Labrakis
Football Academies Director	(Greece) Georgios Polychronakis, (Greece) Kostas Giapizoglou

- Last updated: 4 August 2026
- Source: ergotelis.gr

=== Technical staff ===
Position	Name	Nationality
Head coach	Nikos Badimas	(Greece)
Assistant coach	Manolis Soutzis	(Greece)
Assistant coach − Analyst	Christos Tsakiris	(Greece)
Fitness coach	Georgios Gounelas	(Greece)
Goalkeepers Coach	Anastasios Meintanis	(Greece)
General Manager	Stavros Labrakis	(Greece)
Medical staff
Position	Name	Nationality
Doctor	Sifis Christoforakis	(Greece)
Assistant doctor	Nikos Androulakis	(Greece)
Physiotherapist	Aposotolos Fyrgadis	(Greece)
Masseur	Dimitris Darivianakis	(Greece)
Caretaker	Svetlozar Gospodinov	(Bulgaria)

== Managerial history ==
- (Greece) Giannis Petrakis (1992–94)
- (Greece) Athanasios Loukanidis (1994)
- (Albania) Andrea Betini (1996–97)
- (Greece) Manolis Patemtzis (1999 – 28 December 1999)
- (Greece) Myron Sifakis (28 December 1999 – 31 May 2001: 1 year, 5 months and 3 days)
- (Greece) Pavlos Dermitzakis (2 July 2001 – 7 November 2001: 4 months and 5 days)
- (Greece) Myron Sifakis (9 November 2001 – 4 April 2005: 3 years, 4 months and 26 days)
- (Greece) Manolis Patemtzis (5 April 2005 – 30 January 2006: 9 months and 25 days)
- (Greece) Nikos Karageorgiou (1 February 2006 – 30 April 2012: 6 years, 2 months and 29 days)
- (Cyprus) (Serbia) Siniša Gogić (28 June 2012 – 16 April 2013: 9 months and 19 days)
- (Greece) Stavros Labrakis & (Greece) Vasilios Plesitis (interim) (16 April 2013 – 14 June 2013: 1 month and 29 days)
- (Greece) Giannis Petrakis (14 June 2013 – 13 January 2014: 6 months and 30 days)
- (Greece) Marinos Ouzounidis (20 January 2014 – 13 May 2014: 3 months and 23 days)
- (Spain) Juan Ferrando (3 July 2014 – 1 September 2014: 1 month and 29 days)
- (Greece) Pavlos Dermitzakis (5 September 2014 – 15 December 2014: 3 months and 10 days)
- (Greece) Giannis Taousianis (15 December 2014 – 12 February 2015: 1 month and 28 days)
- (Greece) (Romania) Ioannis Matzourakis (12 February 2015 – 25 February 2015: 13 days)
- (Greece) Giannis Taousianis (28 February 2015 – 30 June 2015: 4 months and 2 days)
- (Bosnia and Herzegovina) Jasminko Velić (5 August 2015 – 21 October 2015: 2 months and 16 days)
- (Greece) Stavros Labrakis (21 October 2015 – 9 February 2016: 3 months and 19 days)
- (Greece) Giannis Chatzinikolaou (16 June 2016 – 25 October 2016: 4 months and 9 days)
- (Greece) Nikos Oustampasidis (26 October 2016 – 16 January 2017: 2 months and 21 days)
- (Greece) Soulis Papadopoulos (18 January 2017 − 29 July 2017: 6 months and 11 days)
- (Greece) Takis Gonias (21 August 2017 − 29 May 2018: 9 months and 8 days)
- (Cyprus) Nikki Papavasiliou (29 May 2018 − 1 September 2019: 1 year, 3 months and 3 days)
- (Greece) Giannis Taousianis (2 September 2019 – 18 June 2021: 1 year, 9 months and 16 days)
- (Greece) Nikos Badimas (27 June 2021 – 20 May 2022: 10 months and 23 days)
