= Pankritio Stadium =

Building in Heraklion, Crete Region, Greece

- Interactive map of Pankritio Stadium
- Location: Heraklion, Crete, Greece
- Coordinates: 35°20′12″N 25°6′22″E
- Owner: Hellenic Olympic Committee
- Operator: City of Heraklion
- Capacity: 26,240
- Surface: Grass
- Scoreboard: LED
- Record attendance: 27,950 (Ergotelis v Olympiacos, 20 February 2005)
- Field size: 105 x 68 m

Construction
- Groundbreaking: 1990
- Built: 31 December 2003
- Opened: 31 March 2004
- Renovated: June 2025
- Cost: € 50,000,000
- Architects: Vassilis Floudas & Associates

Tenants
- Ergotelis (2004−2022); OFI (2005−2009, 2025−); Greece national football team(select matches)

Website
- www.aahaeota.gr

The Pankritio Stadium (Greek: Παγκρήτιο Στάδιο, Pankritio Stadio, literally: Pancretan Stadium) is a multi-purpose sports stadium located in Heraklion on the island of Crete. It was completed on 31 December 2003, and officially opened on 31 March 2004. As one of the most modern sports venues in Greece at the time, it was used as one of the football venues to host matches of the 2004 Summer Olympic football tournament. It has a capacity of 26,240 seats, and was the home ground of local association football clubs Ergotelis. It also serves as the home stadium of OFI (starting from the 2025-26 season onwards) and is also one of Greece national team's home grounds.

== Location ==
The Pankritio Stadium is located in Heraklion, at the Lido district to the west of the city center. It has been built about 50 meters from the island coast, and is neighbored by the Lido Indoor Hall and the city's outdoor pool venue, of which the whole district is named after (Lido).

== History ==
The stadium broke ground sometime during the late 80s, however construction work was not completed on time, and was eventually indefinitely postponed. Once Greece won the bid to host the 2004 Summer Olympics, construction of the stadium finally continued in 2001. It was eventually completed on 31 December 2003. The total construction cost was estimated at €50,000,000. The new stadium was officially opened on 31 March 2004, to host an international friendly game between Greece and Switzerland.

Due to its size, age and ranking, the Pankritio was selected as one of the football venues of the 2004 Summer Olympics Football Tournament, hosting in total 10 matches (5 men's Group Stage matches, 2 women's Group Stage matches, one men's Quarterfinals match, one women's Quarterfinals match and one women's Semi-Final match). After the tournament, the stadium was rented out, and has since been used as a training and home ground of the city's football club Ergotelis, and occasionally also by Greece. In 2006, the Pankritio hosted the 2005–06 Greek Cup Final, the first to be played in Heraklion since 1931.

Although primarily considered a football stadium, the Pankritio, has also been used to host major athletics events, such as the 2004 Tsiklitiria annual IAAF World Challenge meeting and the 2015 European Team Championships First League. The stadium has also been used for a number of music concerts, most notably hosting Deep Purple and Vasilis Papakonstantinou on May 6, 2011.

In 2015 parts of the stadium's west-side roof were detached following a major wind storm affecting Crete. Eventually the roof would be detached completely for safety reasons. In 2021, the roof was re-attached, however in 2024 the stadium was closed temporarily following another roof detachment, this time at the east side of the stadium.

In 2025, renovation works began at the stadium in light of upcoming friendly matches against Bulgaria and Slovakia hosted by the Greek national football team, to meet the highest UEFA category standards. They include the establishment of 50 VIP seats, the addition of extra low energy lights, installation of new sets of railings of different sizes, and the overall restoration of the stadium's exterior.

== Facilities ==
The Pankritio Stadium sports complex features in total two football grounds built to international standards (main stadium and training ground), an 8-lane track, an auxiliary 6-lane track, an indoor gym and swimming pool, multi-purpose halls for boxing, wrestling, fencing, dance, weightlifting, shooting, and tae kwon do, a rowing simulator and a physiotherapy room with sauna and hot tub. Additionally, the stadium features seminar meeting rooms, a dining room, and a showroom featuring exhibits from the 2004 Summer Olympics and 2011 Special Olympics.

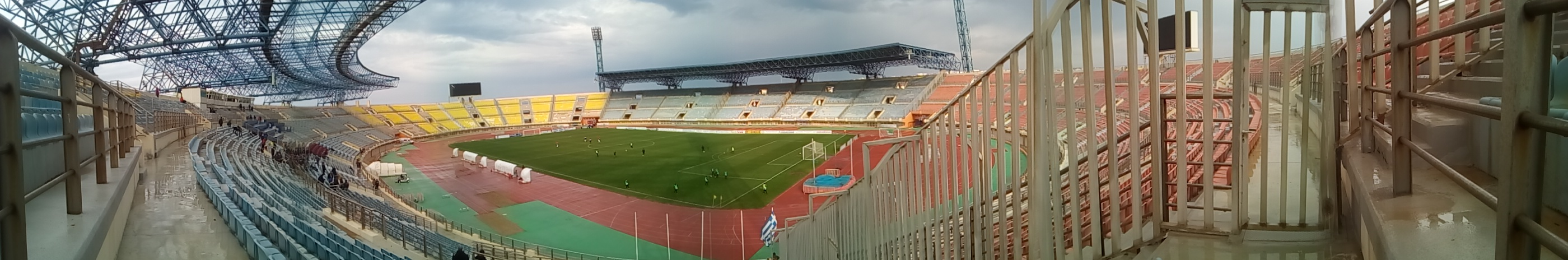
Panorama of the stadium

The complex is neighbored by the city's outdoor swimming pool and the Lido Indoor Hall.

== Tenants ==
The stadium has been used as the home ground of Football League football team Ergotelis, since its opening in 2004, as their traditional home turf Nikos Kazantzakis Stadium was declared unfit for use in official matches at any level of the Greek football league system since 2004. Between 2006 and 2009, the stadium was also used by Ergotelis' rival OFI, until their original home ground, Theodoros Vardinogiannis Stadium, upgrade was done. However, in 2025, given the constant reduction of usable spectator capacity due to safety issues, Pankritio will indefinitely serve as OFI's home starting from the 2025-26 season.

The Pankritio serves as an occasional home ground for the Greece national football team and has hosted both friendlies and competitive fixtures.

== Records ==
The stadium attendance record and first ever sold-out event was set on 20 February 2005, in a Super League match between Ergotelis and reigning champions Olympiacos with 27,950 tickets being sold. The result was a 2−1 victory for the home team.

== 2004 Summer Olympics ==
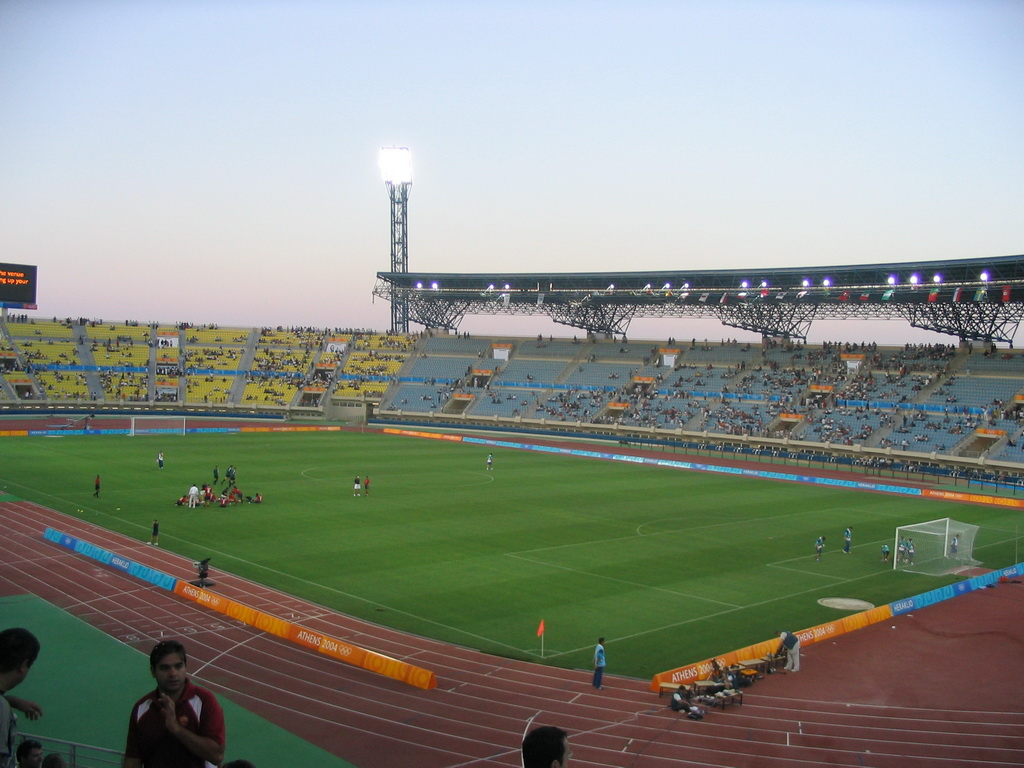
Pankritio Stadium during the 2004 Summer Olympics Football tournament.

Pankritio Stadium hosted six games of the men's football tournament at the 2004 Summer Olympics, and four games of the women's Olympic Football tournament.

=== Men's tournament ===
Date	Time	Team No. 1	Res.	Team No. 2	Round	Attendance
11 August 2004	20:30	Tunisia	1–1	Australia	Group C	15,757
12 August 2004	20:30	Costa Rica	0–0	Morocco	Group D	3,212
14 August 2004	20:30	Serbia and Montenegro	1–5	Australia	Group C	8,857
15 August 2004	20:30	Morocco	1–2	Portugal	Group D	7,581
18 August 2004	20:30	Costa Rica	4–2	Portugal	Group D	11,218
21 August 2004	18:00	Iraq	1–0	Australia	Quarter-finals	10,023

=== Women's tournament ===
Date	Time	Team No. 1	Res.	Team No. 2	Round	Attendance
11 August 2004	18:00	Greece	0–3	United States	Group C	15,757
14 August 2004	20:30	Greece	0–1	Australia	Group C	8,857
20 August 2004	21:00	Mexico	0–5	Brazil	Quarter-finals	3,012
23 August 2004	18:00	United States	2–1 (a.e.t.)	Germany	Semi finals	5,165
