= Ergotelis B.C. =

Greek amateur basketball club in Heraklion, Crete

Ergotelis
- Leagues: Greek C Basket League
- Founded: 15 October 1968; 58 years ago
- Arena: Lido Indoor Hall
- Capacity: 1,400
- Location: Heraklion, Crete, Greece
- Team colours: Yellow and black
- President: Vangelis Giannoulakis
- Head coach: Giannis Viskadourakis
- Ownership: Gymnastics Club Ergotelis
- Championships: 16 Cretan Championships; 3 Cretan Cups
Home	Away

G.S. Ergotelis Basketball (Greek: Γ.Σ. Εργοτέλης Μπάσκετ), also known simply as Ergotelis, is a Greek amateur basketball club, part of the multi-sport club Gymnastics Club Ergotelis, that is based in Heraklion, Crete. The club's basketball department currently competes in the Greek C Basket League, and was officially founded in 1968, the same year it joined the registers of the Greek Federation of Sporting Clubs. In 1983, Ergotelis was one of the clubs that signed the establishment of the Cretan Basketball Associations Union. Currently, both men's and women's basketball departments are amateur clubs, that host home games at the Lido Indoor Hall in Heraklion, a basketball court with a capacity of 1,400 spectators. Ergotelis currently holds the record for most regional titles won in Crete, having won a total of 16 regional Championships and 3 Cretan Cups, since the Cretan Local Basketball Committee, the governing body of basketball on the island, was founded in 1968 (and replaced by the Cretan Basketball Associations Union in 1983).

== Club history ==
=== Creation ===
On 15 October 1968, Ergotelis' basketball department was the first in Heraklion to join the registers of the Greek Federation of Sporting Clubs (the governing body for basketball in Greece, the Hellenic Basketball Federation became an independent organization in 1970). This was at a time when the club's football department officials were accused by the Greek military junta of 1967–1974 for «deviating from the purposes for which they were elected, turning the club into an instrument servicing political, and sometimes unpatriotic objectives».

In the summer of 1968, and after AEK B.C. won the FIBA European Cup Winners' Cup, the Greek Federation of Sporting Clubs sent out representatives to Heraklion to promote the sport of basketball in the city. In a meeting held at the offices of the Heraklion Union of Football Clubs, the decision was made for prominent sport clubs operating in the city, Ergotelis, G.E. Heraklion, OFI and Irakleio O.A.A. to form basketball departments. Similarly, clubs A.O. Kydon and O.A. Chania representing the nearby city of Chania were also invited to participate in the discussions.

Key members in the establishment of the club's basketball department were N. Papadogiannis, T. Sinopoulos, V. Kokkinis, D. Giannoulakis and I. Myrtakis, who was also appointed first president of the Cretan Local Basketball Committee. The very first training sessions were held behind the spectators' seating area and subsequently on the sidelines of Ergotelis F.C. home ground Martinengo Stadium. Charis Evangelinos was appointed first head coach of the club, being subsequently replaced in 1969 by former Panathinaikos athlete, Kimonas Agathos.

=== 1969−1977: First Steps ===
In April 1969, Ergotelis organized its first tournament, in which Sporting and Olympiacos represented the capital, Athens. As the Cretan Local Basketball Committee gradually became the governing body of basketball in Crete, Ergotelis participated in May 1969 in the first Eastern Cretan Local Basketball Committee Championship, and subsequently won its first title. During the next decade, Ergotelis won the regional championship an additional 6 times, in 1970, 1971, 1974, 1976, 1977 and 1979.

After winning the 1975–76 Cretan Championship, and under coach Vangelis Karkanakis, Ergotelis participated in the Provincial Championship, attempting to promote to the national competitions, and in particular, the Greek B Basketball League. The goal was met during the next season, 1976–77, during which the club once again won the regional title in Crete. The club appointed Giannis Ioannidis, a man who would later become one of the most successful basketball coaches in Greece, as head coach and travelled to Athens to participate in the Provincial Championship. After victories over Kydon Chania (59–51) and Chalkida (75–69), Ergotelis secured a place in a national competition for the first time in its history.

=== 1977–1983: Competing at national level ===
During the 1977–78 season, Ergotelis made its debut in the Greek B Basketball League. After 20 matches however, the club managed claim only a single victory (vs. Dorieas Rodos, 58–33), and as a result, was instantly relegated.

For the next season, 1978–79, Ergotelis, led by head coach Manthos Stathakis, was once again crowned Cretan Champion, and thus participated in the Provincial Championship held in August 1979. The club tied at the top of the final standings table with Panachaiki, but secured promotion to the B League as it had won the head-to-head match during the championship.

During the 1979–80 B League season, Ergotelis was placed in a separate Southern Group, along with 11 other clubs. At the end of the season, Ergotelis placed last, and was once again relegated. The next year, the Eastern and Western Cretan Local Basketball Committees merged, forming the Unified Cretan Local Basketball Committee.

During the 1981–82 season, Ergotelis won its first Cretan Cup, after a 56–45 victory over Kydon Chania in the competition final. The same year, Ergotelis also won the Cretan Local Basketball Committee Championship, and participated once more in the Provincial Championship, where it placed 2nd in the Southern Group. Ergotelis eventually won the promotion play-off match vs. Faeakas Kerkyra (51–50), thus making a return to the B League. In what proved to be the club's last appearance in the competition for over 30 years, Ergotelis managed to win only 3 out of a total 26 matches in the 1982–83 B League season, and as a result was relegated once again after claiming the bottom spot in the League Table.

=== 1983−1992: Regional competitions ===
During 1984–85, Ergotelis again won the Cretan Championship, after a 64–44 victory over Kydon in the competition final, however the club failed to promote to national level after partaking in a promotion play-off tournament. More of the same happened during the 1986–87 season, in which the Cretan Local Basketball Committee Championship was renamed to Cretan Basketball Association Union A Basketball League, which saw the club finish in 2nd place. Ergotelis managed to win the 1989–90 edition of the tournament, however the club once again failed to achieve promotion.

In the end, during the 1991–92 season under coach Kostas Dionysopoulos, and once again after the club won the regional title in Crete, Ergotelis managed to promote to the newly founded C League, after coming through undefeated in the promotion play-off tournament.

=== 1992–2009: Attempts in the C League and decline ===
Ergotelis made its debut in the C League during the 1992–93 season, being placed in a Group along with 11 other teams. The club finished in 11th place after an 8–14 record, and was subsequently relegated back to the Cretan A League. The next season, Ergotelis once again won the Cretan title, after winning the finals series against O.A. Chania 3–2, thus making an instant return to the C League.

In its second season in the C League during the 1995–96 season, Ergotelis finished in 10th place, again leading to relegation to the local championship. In the summer, the club merged with another local basketball club, Kronos, and won the 1996–97 Cretan A League for the 13th time in its history. During the following season (1997–98), Ergotelis managed to stay clear from relegation in the C League, making quality changes to the roster and finishing in 8th place. However, as the club faced serious internal issues throughout the 1998–99 season, Ergotelis was once again relegated.

The club made one more brief return to the C League after winning its 14th Cretan Championship in the 2001–02 season. The 2002–03 C League season saw the club finish in the bottom of the table (tied with Kentavros Dafni), after a 3–23 record. For the next 6 years, and until the spring of 2009, Ergotelis competed in the Cretan A League, unable to record any notable achievements.

=== 2009–2017: Return to the Nationals and meltdown ===
In the 2009–10 season, Ergotelis won both the Cretan A League (15th title), as well as the Cretan Cup (2nd title), thus being promoted back to the C League after several years of absence. During the 2010–11 C League season, Ergotelis was placed in the 2nd Southern Group along with 13 opponents. After a 14–12 record, Ergotelis finished 6th, tied with Chalkida, securing its place in next season's tournament.

The next season (2011–12) Ergotelis once again competed in the same Group, whose participants were reduced from 14 to 12. The club finished in 7th place, after a triple tie-in with Polis Kallithea and Niki Amarousiou, all of which had an 11–11 record during the season. After another re-structuring of the Group to contain a total of 11 teams in 2012–13, Ergotelis finished in 6th place after an 11–9 record, staying in the C League for the third time in a row.

Ιn its fourth consecutive season in the C League, Ergotelis was once again placed in the 2nd Southern Group, which was once again made up of 11 teams. With a 13–7 record, Ergotelis achieved its best finish in the League so far, by placing 4th in the final Group standings table. However, the club was defeated 70–65 in the play-off ranking match vs. Apollon Ancient Corinth, the club that placed 4th in the 2013–14 C League Northern Group.

Promotion to the B League became an even more difficult task in the 2014–15 C League season, as the Groups were once again restructured to contain 14 teams each. With a 17–9 record, Ergotelis finished in third place, which marks the best performance of the club in the competition. Afterwards, the club squared off against Promitheas Chalandri in the neutral ground of Chania, winning the play-off match 73–69 and gaining advantage for promoting to the B League, in case the league would be restructured. Indeed, the Hellenic Basketball Federation went through with its planned changes, announcing Ergotelis' return to the B League after 32 years. The club failed to avoid relegation at the end of the season however, and after calculating costs, club president Vangelis Giannoulakis decided to opt out of the C League, and instead have the club start anew in the Cretan Basket League, in hopes of attracting more financiers for the future.

== Logos and uniforms ==
=== Logos ===
−2014

2014−2020

== Personnel ==
=== Current roster ===
Ergotelis B.C. roster
Players
Coaches

Pos.	No.	Nat.	Name	Ht.	Wt.	Age
G	1	(Greece)	Chasapis, Alex	1.85 m (6 ft 1 in)
F	2	(Greece)	Nisotakis, Nikos	1.90 m (6 ft 3 in)
G	3	(Greece)	Maniadis, Angelos	1.84 m (6 ft 0 in)
F	4	(Greece)	Skandalakis, Nikos	2.00 m (6 ft 7 in)
F	5	(Greece)	Christodoulou, Pantelis	1.93 m (6 ft 4 in)
F	6	(Greece)	Dapoulakis, Myron	1.92 m (6 ft 4 in)
G	7	(Greece)	Omirolis, Pavlos	1.87 m (6 ft 2 in)
F	8	(Greece)	Dospras, Giorgos	1.97 m (6 ft 6 in)
G	9	(Greece)	Athanasiadis, Giannis	1.86 m (6 ft 1 in)
F	10	(Greece)	Kalogerakis, Giorgos	1.89 m (6 ft 2 in)
F	11	(Greece)	Ambadiotakis, Nikos	1.92 m (6 ft 4 in)
F	12	(Greece)	Vertoudos, Kostas	1.98 m (6 ft 6 in)
G	13	(Greece)	Chomatas, Theodoros	1.87 m (6 ft 2 in)
C	14	(Greece)	Kompselis, Vasilis (C)	1.95 m (6 ft 5 in)

Head coach

- (Greece) Giannis Viskadourakis

Assistant coach(es)

- (Greece) Alexis Christodoulou

Legend

- (C) Team captain
- Injured

== Notable former coaches ==
- Charis Evangelinos
- Kimon Agathos
- Giorgos Filippakis
- Antonis Pantazis
- Giorgos Nikitopoulos
- Giorgos Karavias
- Vangelis Karkanakis
- Angelikakis
- Giannis Ioannidis
- Manthos Stathakis
- Kostas Dionysopoulos
- Aris Raftopoulos
- S. Karavias
- Nikos Toulis
- Stathakis
- Vangelis Chiladakis
- Lakis Karabelas
- Christos Diktapanidis
- Giannis Stathopoulos
- Kostas Perantonakis
- Iraklis Sfakianakis
- Dimitirs Kasapidis
- Manos Karlaftis
- Koulouriotis
- Alexandris
- Kokolakis
- Nikos Galifianakis
- Spiros Karlaftis
- Manolis Dimitriadis
- Giorgos Makrakis
- Giorgos Amerikanos

== Honours ==
=== Regional competitions ===
- Cretan A Basketball League
  - Winners (16): 1969, 1970, 1971, 1974, 1976, 1977, 1979, 1982, 1985, 1990, 1992, 1994, 1997, 2002, 2010, 2020
- Cretan Cup
  - Winners (3): 1983, 2010, 2020

== Other teams ==
=== Youth teams ===
Ergotelis youth basketball has won three Youth Cretan Championships, starting in the 1970–71. In 1986, Ergotelis Youth, under coach Manolis Stavrakakis, finished 4th in the Greek Youth Basketball League held in Karditsa, which is the best in the history of the department.

=== Women's Basketball ===
Ergotelis currently maintains women's basketball departments who partake in the Adult, Young Women and Teenage Championships organized by Cretan Basketball Clubs Association.
