= Ergoteles of Himera =

5th-century BC Olympic running victor

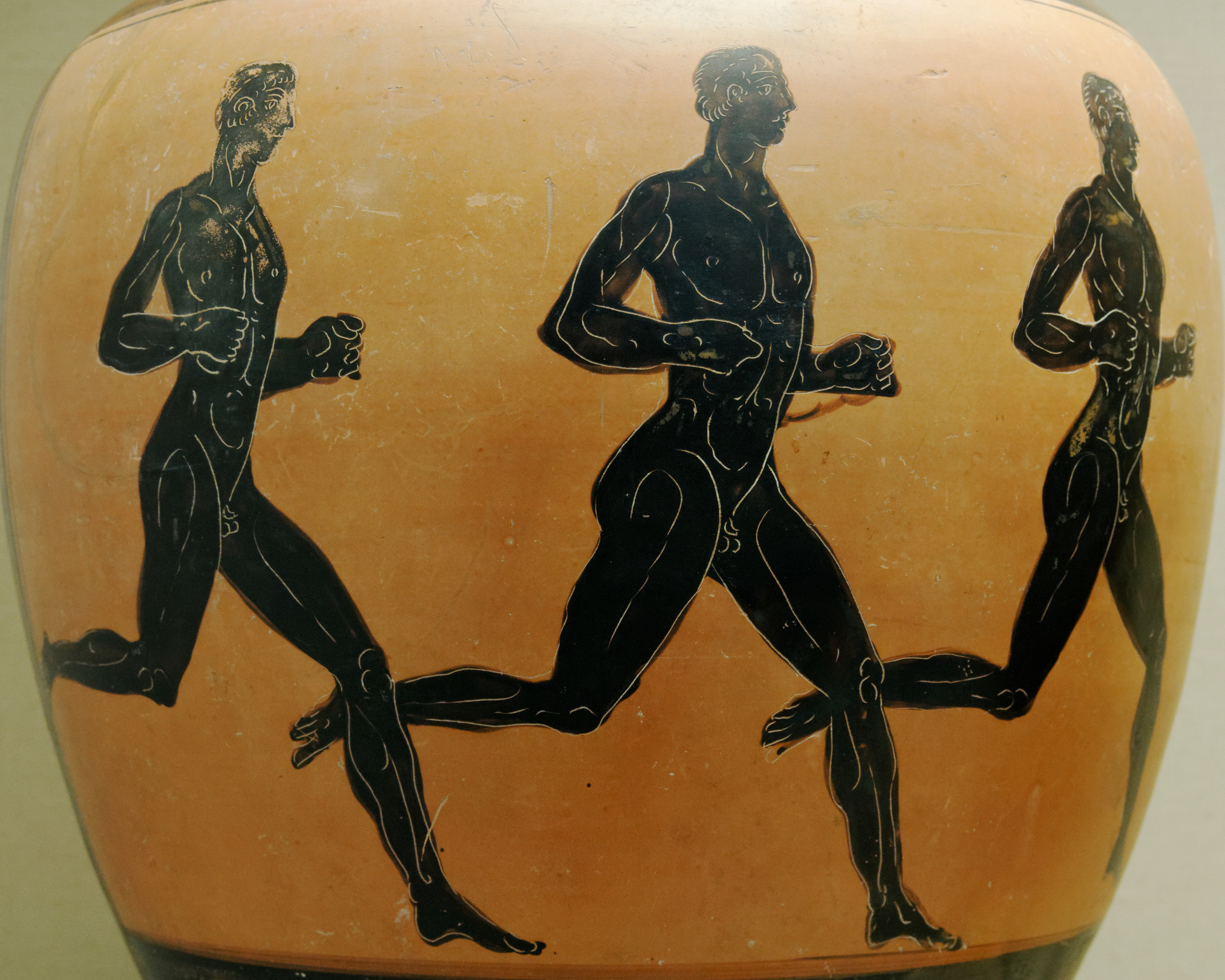
Ancient runners from an Attic black-figured Panathenaic prize amphora.

Ergoteles (Ancient Greek: Ἐργοτέλης) or Ergotelis, was a native of Knossos and Olympic runner in the Ancient Olympic Games.

Civil disorder (ancient Greek: Stasis) had compelled him to leave Crete. He came to Sicily and was naturalized as a citizen of Himera, Magna Graecia. He won the Olympic dolichos ("long race") of 472 BC and 464 BC, as well as winning twice in both Pythian and Isthmian Games.

A four-line inscribed epigram of c. 450 BC found in Olympia commemorates the six Ergotelian victories. The base of an inscribed statue at Olympia, which was seen and exploited by the geographer Pausanias, was rediscovered in 1953. Pindar honoured Ergoteles with the following Epinikion hymn:

Daughter of Eleutherian Jove, protecting Fortune, to thy power I pray to guard imperial Himera : Guided by thee the winged gallies move thro' the wide sea : thine are the impetuous wars, the pondering councils : by thy changeful sway. Now sunk below, now lifted to the stars, thro' life's illusions vain Hope steers her wandering way. But by sure presage to descry the approaching day's event, mysterious Heaven hath not to helpless mortals given; And all is blind towards dim futurity. Oft on the best in fond Opinion's spite Joy's sad reverse has fallen; others no less . With Woe's distressful storms long doomed to fight. Have changed in one short hour disaster to success. Son of Philanor, thy renown had shed its faded flower, thy speed beyond thy native bower, like the brave cock's domestic wars, unknown : Had not, Ergoteles, the civil fray, that friend with friend embroils, forced thee from Cnossian fields away; Now in the Olympic grove for nobler toils, by Isthmians once, and twice in Pytho crowned, a worthier hearth thy Fame has found by the warm waves of Himera, whose Nymphs by thee ennobled hail thy stay.

== Namesake ==
The Gymnastics Club Ergotelis established in 1929 in Heraklion, Crete, was named after Ergoteles, in commemoration of the first Olympic champion native to the modern Heraklion prefecture.
