= Lido Indoor Hall =

Sports venue in Heraklion, Crete, Greece

- The Lido
- Interactive map of Lido Indoor Hall
- Location: Heraklion, Crete, Greece
- Coordinates: 35°20′8.599″N 25°6′16.277″E
- Owner: Hellenic Ministry of Sports, General Secretariat of Sports
- Capacity: Basketball: 1,400
- Surface: Parquet

Construction
- Groundbreaking: 1986
- Opened: 1986
- Renovated: 1995

Tenant
- Ergotelis

The Lido Indoor Hall, or simply, the Lido Hall, is a multi-purpose indoor arena that is located in the city of Heraklion, on the island of Crete, in Greece. It is named after the district where it's located, called Lido (Greek: Λίντο). The arena has been used to host a variety of sports events, such as volleyball, boxing, kickboxing, wrestling and Mixed martial arts, but its primary use is hosting basketball games. It is the home of Ergotelis B.C. of the Greek C Basket League and former home of Irakleio B.C. during its tenure in Greek A1 Basketball League. It is part of the Heraklion National Sports Centre, and is located next to the Pankritio Stadium. It has a seating capacity of 1,400.

== History ==
The arena was built in 1986. Its current state dates back to 1995, when the arena was partially renovated (e.g. more tiers were added) to be the home of Irakleio B.C., when the team was promoted to the Greek A1 Basketball League, the top tier of the Greek basketball league system. For many years it was the only indoor arena in Heraklion, until the construction of the TEI Indoor Sports Hall in 2004 and primarily that of the Heraklion Indoor Sports Arena in 2007. Due to these newer venues, the Lido Indoor Hall has been considered outdated and inadequate for the city's indoor sports outings, currently being used as the home for Cretan Basket League club Ergotelis. Despite appearances though, the arena surprisingly hosted the 2005 Greek Basketball Cup final contested by Greek basketball powerhouses Panathinaikos and Aris.
