= AE Mylopotamos F.C. =

Α.Ε. Mylopotamos
- Full name: Αθλητική Ένωση Μυλοποτάμου; Athlitikí Énosi Mylopotámou (Athletic Union of Mylopotamos)
- Short name: AEM
- Founded: 1962; 64 years ago A.E. Peramatos (1962–1968); A.E. Astir Peramatos (1968–2015); A.E. Mylopotamou (2015–Present)
- Chairman: Manolis Kougioumtzis
- League: Rethymno FCA A Division
- 2018−19: 1st (promotion in Gamma Ethniki)
Home colours	Away colours

A.E. Mylopotamos, short for Athletic Union of Mylopotamos (Greek: Αθλητική Ένωση Μυλοποτάμου, romanized: Athlitikí Énosi Mylopotámou) and also simply known as AEM, is a Greek football club, based in Perama, Rethymno, Crete. Their colours are blue and yellow, and their crest is a star, a reference to the club's previous name Asteras Perama (Perama Star, Greek: Αστέρας Περάματος, romanized: Astéras Perámatos). The club currently competes in the regional Rethymno FCA A Division, having previously played in the third tier of the Greek football league system.

== History ==
The club was founded as Athlitiki Enosi Astir Peramatos and was commonly known as Asteras Perama until 2015, when the club's board of directors decided to reach out to the entire Mylopotamos' community and rename the club as A.E. Mylopotamos to represent the whole region. The club managed to win the Rethymno FCA A Division Championship in the 2016−17 season, thus managing promotion to the Gamma Ethniki, the third tier of the Greek football league system for the first time in club history.

== Honours ==
=== Regional ===
- Rethymno FCA Championship
  - Winners (6): 1988–89, 1996–97, 2004–05, 2016–17, 2018–19, 2021–22
- Rethymno FCA Cup
  - Winners (7): 1988–89, 1989–90, 1990–91, 1991–92, 1992–93, 2013–14, 2014–15
