= Christos Aravidis =

Greek footballer (born 1987)

Personal information
- Full name: Christos Aravidis
- Date of birth: 13 March 1987 (age 39)
- Place of birth: Athens, Greece
- Height: 1.77 m (5 ft 9 1/2 in)
- Position: Forward

Youth career
- 2002–2004: Akratitos

Senior career*
Years	Team	Apps	(Gls)
2004–2006	Akratitos	23	(1)
2006–2009	Panionios	50	(4)
2008–2009	→ Ethnikos Asteras (loan)	23	(3)
2009–2011	Aris	13	(0)
2011–2012	Doxa Dramas	25	(1)
2012–2014	Panionios	55	(20)
2014–2017	AEK Athens	76	(29)
2018–2019	OFI	9	(1)
2019	Asteras Tripolis	11	(0)
2019–2020	Yverdon	15	(6)
2020	Lamia	6	(2)
2020–2021	Panachaiki	20	(6)
2021–2022	Levadiakos	2	(0)
2022–2023	Apollon Pontus	17	(1)
2024–2025	Kentavros Vrilissia	7	(1)

International career^{‡}
2003–2004	Greece U17	8	(3)
2005	Greece U19	8	(0)
2006–2007	Greece U21	11	(4)
2015–2016	Greece	5	(1)
- * Club domestic league appearances and goals as of 15 June 2023 ‡ National team caps and goals as of 22:18, 10 June 2016 (UTC)

Christos Aravidis (Greek: Χρήστος Αραβίδης; born 13 March 1987) is a Greek former professional footballer who plays as a forward.

== Early life ==
It was at the age of 7,5 when Aravidis first visited the academies of AEK Athens. "In the beginning was just fun after a game became a passion," he recalls, when his father and ex-football player unknowingly motivated his son to deal with football. "My father was a footballer and through him I loved football."

== Club career ==
=== Akratitos ===
His steps in football seemed always carefully and selectively. After playing in the Football League for Akratitos, he made his debut in the Super League Greece with the club at the age of 18,5 against AEK Athens. He scored his first goal in the major league in a match against OFI and he was constantly selected in the Greece U-21 team.

=== Panionios ===
He signed a three-year contract with Panionios. Ewald Lienen, the new coach of Panionios was presented a few days ago, and the 19 years' old had to fight to find time in the first major challenge of his career. He succeeded beyond any expectation. Became a member of the starting XI and had a striking appearance in Thessaloniki against Aris with one goal and assist, and ended his first season in the club having 30 appearances and two goals, but after December he gradually lost his position in the team. The scene was similar the next season besides the 26 appearances and three goals.

==== Loan to Ethnikos Asteras ====
Aravidis joined Ethnikos Asteras on loan until the end of the 2008–2009 season on summer of 2008. In April 2009 he filed an appeal against the Ethnikos Asteras, as he played almost entirely unpaid and at the end of the season being released from Panionios, will search the new challenge in his career.

=== Aris ===
Aris offered him the opportunity to make a step further, by signing a three-year contract. But in Aris neither Mazinho in the beginning, nor Héctor Cúper trusted him and Aravidis succeeded to make only 13 appearances with the club, in almost two years. "The fact is that I did not get the opportunities I deserve. Prior to Aris I had a good football path, which I will try to keep it. This is football and there is no problem. Not always all come as you want." In August 2012 he filed an appeal against Aris, as he played almost entirely unpaid. asking for the subtraction of two points due to the debt to him.

=== Doxa Drama ===
Doxa Drama was the next step in his career. In October 2012 he filed his third appeal (after Ethnikos Asteras and Aris) against the Doxa Drama as there was a private agreement for bonus participations and rentals that never received.

=== Return to Panionios ===
In the 2012–13 season became the club's top scorer with 8 goals, contributing in their promotion to Super League. Eventually over the years he made 112 appearances (24 goals, 8 assists) with Panionios.

=== AEK Athens ===
On 31 January 2014, besides the rumours for PAOK and Panathinaikos, Aravidis decided to play for AEK Athens in Football League at the end of 2013-14 season by signing a three years' contract, when the team was in Football League and since then is a first team option. Aravidis at the end of 2014-15 season, in the few minutes that he played against Alimos, typically secured the lead in the list of scorers of the Southern Group of the Football League, with 13 goals. On 22 August 2015, in a 3–0 home game against Platanias scored his first goal in Super League Greece with AEK Athens.

"Fans will be satisfied if we win the championship. We want the best possible result. If we continue to work hard we'll manage something. Our targets are the Greek Cup and the championship. AEK Athens are a huge club and we returned where we belong to. The match against PAOK is a big game that all fans should enjoy it. We'll try for the best. It's always nice to play with full stands" Aravidis said. On 23 September 2015, he opened the score in an away derby game against PAOK, but his club still lost. Christos Aravidis is due a new contract as his current one expires at the end of 2017.

On 20 December 2016, in a home match against PAS Giannina he was then sent off in the 10th minute of the game after headbutting Thodoris Berios in the chest. On 12 March 2017 he scored the last goal of AEK in the 3–0 home "double-headed eagle" derby against PAOK. On 6 April 2017 he scored the second goal in his club effort to win a place in season playoffs sealing a 2–0 away win against Platanias F.C.

On 7 June 2017, AEK Athens officially announced that the contract of international striker was solved. Aravidis had 96 appearances (34 goals, 9 assists) in all competitions with the club.

=== OFI ===
On 7 August 2018, Aravidis, after a year without a club, completed a free transfer move to Greek Super League side OFI on a year contract for an undisclosed fee. On 30 October 2018, Aravidis scored after a long period (572 days to be exact) a hat-trick against Niki Volos in a 3–0 home Greek Cup game.

=== Asteras Tripolis ===
On 4 February 2019, after six months with OFI, Aravidis signed a six months contract with Asteras Tripolis for an undisclosed fee. On 17 February 2019, he scored his first goal with the club in a 4–1 home Greek Cup win against Ergotelis.

=== Yverdon ===
On 29 July 2019 he signed a one-year contract with third-tier Swiss club Yverdon. The 32-year-old forward was absolutely crucial for the club, after scoring six goals in 15 games and helping the Swiss team get a great distance in its effort to gain the promotion. For this reason, the management of Yverdon decided to terminate the contract with the experienced striker in order to save the rest of his contract, and the Greek international received a good amount of compensation as he had a contract until the summer of 2021.

=== Lamia ===
On 14 February 2020 he signed a contract with Super League 1 club Lamia, until the end of the 2019–20 season. On 22 February 2020, he scored a brace in his debut in a 2–2 home draw game against Aris.

=== Panachaiki ===
On 17 August 2020 he signed a contract with Super League 2 club Panachaiki.

== International career ==
Aravidis has a plural international career in youth Greece squads. On 4 September 2015 he made his debut for Greece in a home game for UEFA against Finland in Piraeus. On 8 October 2015 in just his 3rd cap, he scored his first ever goal for Greece by scoring their only goal in a 3–1 away defeat to Northern Ireland in a UEFA Euro 2016 qualifying match in Belfast.

== Career statistics ==
=== Club ===
As of 11 October 2024

Appearances and goals by club, season and competition
Club	Season	League			National Cup		Continental		Other		Total	
Club	Season	Division	Apps	Goals	Apps	Goals	Apps	Goals	Apps	Goals	Apps	Goals
Akratitos	2004–05	Beta Ethniki	12	0	1	0	—		—		13	0
Akratitos	2005–06	Alpha Ethniki	11	1	1	0	—		—		12	1
Akratitos	Total		23	1	2	0	—		—		25	1
Panionios	2006–07	Super League Greece	28	2	2	0	—		—		30	2
Panionios	2007–08	Super League Greece	22	2	2	1	2 (Note: Appearances in UEFA Cup)	0	—		26	3
Panionios	Total		50	4	4	1	2	0	—		56	5
Ethnikos Asteras	2008–09	Beta Ethniki	23	3	2	0	—		—		25	3
Aris	2009–10	Super League Greece	9	0	0	0	—		—		9	0
Aris	2010–11	Super League Greece	4	0	0	0	—		—		4	0
Aris	Total		13	0	0	0	—		—		13	0
Doxa Dramas	2011–12	Super League Greece	24	1	2	0	—		—		26	1
Panionios	2012–13	Super League Greece	25	8	1	0	—		—		26	8
Panionios	2013–14	Super League Greece	30	12	4	0	—		—		34	12
Panionios	Total		55	20	5	0	—		—		60	20
AEK Athens	2014–15	Football League	29	17	9	3	—		—		38	20
AEK Athens	2015–16	Super League Greece	34	9	7	2	—		—		41	11
AEK Athens	2016–17	Super League Greece	13	3	3	0	1 (Note: Appearances in UEFA Europa League qualifiers)	0	—		17	3
AEK Athens	Total		76	29	16	5	1	0	—		93	34
OFI	2018–19	Super League Greece	9	1	2	0	—		—		11	1
Asteras Tripolis	2018–19	Super League Greece	11	0	3	0	—		—		14	0
Yverdon	2019–20	Swiss Promotion League	15	6	0	0	—		—		15	6
Lamia	2019–20	Super League Greece	6	2	—		—		—		6	2
Panachaiki	2020–21	Super League Greece 2	20	6	—		—		—		20	6
Levadiakos	2021–22	Super League Greece 2	2	0	—		—		—		2	0
Apollon Pontus	2022–23	Super League Greece 2	17	1	5	1	—		—		22	2
Kentavros Vrilissia	2024–25	Athens FCA Division 1	7	1	0	0	—		—		7	1
Career total			351	75	44	7	3	0	0	0	396	82

=== International ===
As of 7 June 2016

Greece
Year	Apps	Goals
2015	3	1
2016	2	0
Total	5	1

=== International goals ===
No.	Date	Venue	Opponent	Score	Result	Competition
1.	8 October 2015	Windsor Park, Belfast, Northern Ireland	Northern Ireland	3–1	3–1	UEFA Euro 2016 qualification

== Honours ==
AEK Athens

- Greek Cup: 2015–16
- Football League: 2014–15

Levadiakos

- Super League 2: 2021–22

Individual

- Football League top scorer: 2014–15
