= 2025–26 Gamma Ethniki =

Greek 3rd tier football season

Gamma Ethniki
- Season: 2025–26
- Dates: 13 September 2025 – 17 May 2026
- Champions: Group 1: Panthrakikos Group 2: Apollon Kalamaria Group 3: Elassona Group 4: PAS Pyrgos Group 5: Aris Petroupolis Group 6: Ethnikos Piraeus
- Promoted: Panthrakikos; Apollon Kalamaria; Zakynthos; PAS Pyrgos
- Relegated: Group 1: Thermaikos; PAOK Dytiko; Orestis Orestiada Group 2: Kozani; Asteras Karditsa; Evosmos Group 3: Nea Selefkia; Proodos Rogon; Thesprotos Group 4: Thyella Patras; Ermis Meligou; Pangitheatikos Group 5: Kentavros Vrilissia; Amarynthiakos; Rodos Group 6: Haidari; Aias Salamina; Granitis Agia Marina
- All statistics correct as of 4 June 2026.

The 2025–26 Gamma Ethniki was the 44th season since the official establishment of the championship in 1982 and the 3rd tier of Greek football after the restructuring of 2021. It had an amateur character, while the Hellenic Football Federation (HFF) was responsible for the conduct of the championship.

The competition started on 13 September 2025 with Group 3 and concluded in May 2026, was conducted in six groups, different from the previous 2024–25 season, where there were four groups. 73 teams participated and 4 of them were promoted and 18 of them were relegated at the end of the season. The groups were formed according to geographical criteria and the draw for the fixtures took place on 4 August 2025.

The deadline for applications was 11 July 2025. Iraklis Ammoudia from Serres FCA did not apply and was replaced by Anagennisi Schimatari, while Lamia did not declare participation for 2025–26 Super League Greece 2 and will participate in Gamma Ethniki.

The official match ball supplier for the season was Nike.

== Way of Conduct ==
The championship was held in three (3) phases for the promotion to the higher division and in two (2) phases for the relegation to the lower division.

First Phase: The 1st phase of the six (6) Groups of the Championship in the 2025–2026 season was held with the participation of all teams in 22 matches (home and away matches).

== Promotion and Relegation ==
For Promotion:
Second Phase
After the completion of the 1st phase of the Championship, the teams that occupied positions 1 to 6 in the 1st, 2nd, 3rd, 4th, 5th and 6th Groups participated in a Special Championship in each of the aforementioned Groups, competing again with the teams in their Group in 5 matches (5 single matches, 3 home and 2 away, following a draw). The points accumulated by all teams in the 1st phase of the Championship were transferred to the Special Championship of the teams that took places 1-6.

Third Phase
The teams that occupied the first three (3) places in Groups 1, 2 and 3 as well as the best 2nd team of the aforementioned Groups, formed a Group of four (4) teams and competed among themselves in double matches (6 matches, 3 home and 3 away, following a draw), without transferring the points accumulated in the 1st and 2nd phases of the Championship. The teams that occupied the first two (2) places (1st and 2nd) of the Group were promoted to Super League 2. Same procedure applied for the Groups 4, 5 and 6 and in the end with the same procedure, 2 more teams were promoted to Super League 2.

For Relegation:
Second Phase
After the completion of the 1st phase of the Championship, the teams that occupied positions 7 to 12 in the 1st, 2nd and 3rd Groups, participated in a Special Championship in each of the aforementioned Groups, competing again with the teams in their Group in 5 matches (5 single matches, 3 home and 2 away, following a draw). The points that all teams had accumulated in the 1st phase of the Championship were transferred to the Special Championship of the teams that took places 7-12. The teams that occupied the last three (3) positions (10th, 11th and 12th) in each Group were relegated to Local FCA Championships. Same procedure applied for the Groups 4, 5 and 6 and in the end with the same procedure, 9 more teams were relegated to Local FCA Championships.

== Group 1 ==
=== Teams ===
Location of teams in Group 1 of 2025-26 Gamma Ethniki

Team	Location	Last season
Aetos Ofrynio	Ofrynio	Kavala FCA Champion
Apollon Krya Vrysi	Krya Vrysi	Group 1, 6th
Doxa Drama	Drama	Drama FCA Champion
Iraklis Thermaikos	Thessaloniki	Thessaloniki FCA Champion
Kilkisiakos	Kilkis	Group 1, 9th
Orestis Orestiada	Orestiada	Group 1, 11th
Panthrakikos	Komotini	Group 1, 2nd
PAOK Dytiko	Dytiko	Pella FCA Champion
PAOK Kristoni	Kristoni	Group 1, 5th
Poseidon Nea Michaniona	Michaniona	Group 1, 4th
Thermaikos	Thermi	Group 1, 10th
Xanthi	Xanthi	Xanthi FCA Champion

=== First Phase Standings ===
Pos	Team	Pld	W	D	L	GF	GA	GD	Pts	Promotion or relegation
1	Panthrakikos	22	16	3	3	52	17	+35	51	Qualification to Second Phase of Promotion
2	Xanthi	22	12	8	2	48	17	+31	44	Qualification to Second Phase of Promotion
3	Doxa Drama	22	13	4	5	41	25	+16	43	Qualification to Second Phase of Promotion
4	Iraklis Thermaikos	22	10	8	4	32	18	+14	38	Qualification to Second Phase of Promotion
5	Poseidon Nea Michaniona	22	8	10	4	27	22	+5	34	Qualification to Second Phase of Promotion
6	Aetos Ofrynio	22	10	3	9	37	37	0	33	Qualification to Second Phase of Promotion
7	PAOK Kristoni	22	7	8	7	24	27	−3	29	Qualification to Second Phase of Relegation
8	Apollon Krya Vrysi	22	6	8	8	29	30	−1	26	Qualification to Second Phase of Relegation
9	Thermaikos	22	6	4	12	19	32	−13	22	Qualification to Second Phase of Relegation
10	Kilkisiakos	22	5	6	11	27	38	−11	21	Qualification to Second Phase of Relegation
11	PAOK Dytiko	22	3	7	12	21	42	−21	16	Qualification to Second Phase of Relegation
12	Orestis Orestiada	22	1	1	20	12	63	−51	4	Qualification to Second Phase of Relegation

Source: Hellenic Football Federation: 2025-26 Standings (Group 1) (in Greek)
Rules for classification: 1) points; 2) head-to-head points; 3) head-to-head goal difference; 4) goal difference; 5) goals scored.

=== First Phase Results ===
Home \ Away	AOF	AKV	DOX	IRT	KIL	ORO	PAN	PKD	PKR	POS	THE	XAN
Aetos Ofrynio	—	2–2	2–0	0–1	3–2	3–0	0–1	4–2	2–0	2–4	2–0	0–3
Apollon Krya Vrysi	2–2	—	0–0	1–1	4–0	4–1	1–5	0–0	1–1	1–1	3–1	1–0
Doxa Drama	2–1	3–2	—	1–1	2–1	5–2	1–2	3–1	4–1	4–2	4–1	1–2
Iraklis Thermaikos	1–2	1–0	1–0	—	1–0	4–0	2–2	1–1	3–0	0–0	1–1	1–2
Kilkisiakos	4–2	0–1	1–2	1–1	—	4–0	0–1	5–2	1–1	0–0	1–1	1–3
Orestis Orestiada	0–3	0–3	0–0	1–2	0–1	—	1–3	2–1	0–1	0–1	1–2	0–3
Panthrakikos	5–2	2–0	2–3	2–0	5–1	5–0	—	1–0	4–0	3–1	2–0	0–0
PAOK Dytiko	1–1	4–1	1–3	0–3	1–1	2–1	0–3	—	1–1	1–0	0–2	1–1
PAOK Kristoni	2–0	2–1	0–1	2–0	0–0	4–0	1–0	2–2	—	1–3	0–2	1–1
Poseidon Nea Michaniona	1–2	0–0	1–1	1–1	2–0	3–2	2–1	1–0	0–0	—	3–1	1–1
Thermaikos	0–1	2–1	0–1	1–2	0–1	3–0	0–2	1–0	0–1	0–0	—	1–1
Xanthi	3–1	2–0	1–0	0–3	6–1	5–0	1–1	5–0	2–2	1–1	4–0	—

Source: Hellenic Football Federation: 2025-26 Match Schedule (Group 1) (in Greek)
Legend: Blue = home team win; Yellow = draw; Red = away team win.

=== Second Phase Standings and Results ===
==== Promotion Group Standings ====
Pos	Team	Pld	W	D	L	GF	GA	GD	Pts	Promotion or relegation
1	Panthrakikos (C, Q)	5	4	0	1	15	4	+11	63	Qualification to Third Phase of Promotion
2	Xanthi	5	3	1	1	12	1	+11	54	
3	Doxa Drama	5	3	0	2	7	8	−1	52	
4	Iraklis Thermaikos	5	3	1	1	5	3	+2	48	
5	Poseidon Nea Michaniona	5	1	0	4	7	15	−8	37	
6	Aetos Ofrynio	5	0	0	5	4	19	−15	33	

Source: Hellenic Football Federation: 2025-26 Standings (Promotion Group 1) (in Greek)
Rules for classification: 1) points; 2) head-to-head points; 3) head-to-head goal difference; 4) goal difference; 5) goals scored.
(C) Champions; (Q) Qualified for the phase indicated

==== Promotion Group Results ====
Home \ Away	AOF	DOX	IRT	PAN	POS	XAN
Aetos Ofrynio	—	—	0–2	—	—	0–7
Doxa Drama	3–2	—	0–2	—	—	—
Iraklis Thermaikos	—	—	—	0–2	2–1	0–0
Panthrakikos	5–1	2–0	—	—	6–1	—
Poseidon Nea Michaniona	2–1	2–3	—	—	—	0–3
Xanthi	—	0–1	—	2–0	—	—

Source: Hellenic Football Federation: 2025-26 Match Schedule (Promotion Group 1) (in Greek)
Legend: Blue = home team win; Yellow = draw; Red = away team win.

==== Relegation Group Standings ====
Pos	Team	Pld	W	D	L	GF	GA	GD	Pts	Promotion or relegation
1	Apollon Krya Vrysi	5	3	0	2	11	7	+4	35	
2	PAOK Kristoni	5	2	0	3	8	10	−2	35	
3	Kilkisiakos	5	4	1	0	14	5	+9	34	
4	Thermaikos (R)	5	3	2	0	10	5	+5	33	Relegation to Local FCA Championships
5	PAOK Dytiko (R)	5	1	1	3	5	10	−5	20	Relegation to Local FCA Championships
6	Orestis Orestiada (R)	5	0	0	5	2	14	−12	4	Relegation to Local FCA Championships

Source: Hellenic Football Federation: 2025-26 Standings (Relegation Group 1) (in Greek)
Rules for classification: 1) points; 2) head-to-head points; 3) head-to-head goal difference; 4) goal difference; 5) goals scored.
(R) Relegated

==== Relegation Group Results ====
Home \ Away	AKV	KIL	ORO	PKD	PKR	THE
Apollon Krya Vrysi	—	1–2	—	—	—	1–3
Kilkisiakos	—	—	4–0	5–3	2–0	—
Orestis Orestiada	0–3	—	—	0–1	—	1–3
PAOK Dytiko	1–3	—	—	—	0–2	0–0
PAOK Kristoni	1–3	—	3–1	—	—	—
Thermaikos	—	1–1	—	—	3–2	—

Source: Hellenic Football Federation: 2025-26 Match Schedule (Relegation Group 1) (in Greek)
Legend: Blue = home team win; Yellow = draw; Red = away team win.

== Group 2 ==
=== Teams ===
Location of teams in Group 2 of 2025-26 Gamma Ethniki

Team	Location	Last season
Akrites Sykies	Sykies	Macedonia FCA Champion
Alexandreia	Alexandreia	Group 2, 11th
Apollon Kalamaria	Kalamaria	Group 1, 3rd
Asteras Karditsa	Karditsa	Karditsa FCA Champion
Eordaikos	Ptolemaida	Kozani FCA Champion
Ermis Exochi	Exochi	Pieria FCA Champion
Ethnikos Neo Keramidi	Neo Keramidi	SL2 North Group, 10th, Relegated
Evosmos	Evosmos	Group 1, 8th
Kozani	Kozani	Group 2, 9th
Pierikos	Katerini	Group 2, 2nd
Sarakinos Volos	Volos	Thessaly FCA Champion
Veria	Veria	Imathia FCA Champion

=== First Phase Standings ===
Pos	Team	Pld	W	D	L	GF	GA	GD	Pts	Promotion or relegation
1	Apollon Kalamaria	22	17	4	1	47	6	+41	55	Qualification to Second Phase of Promotion
2	Ethnikos Neo Keramidi	22	14	6	2	49	24	+25	48	Qualification to Second Phase of Promotion
3	Veria	22	12	4	6	32	19	+13	40	Qualification to Second Phase of Promotion
4	Ermis Exochi	22	10	5	7	36	30	+6	35	Qualification to Second Phase of Promotion
5	Pierikos	22	9	3	10	22	23	−1	30	Qualification to Second Phase of Promotion
6	Alexandreia	22	8	5	9	27	31	−4	29	Qualification to Second Phase of Promotion
7	Akrites Sykies	22	8	5	9	29	24	+5	29	Qualification to Second Phase of Relegation
8	Eordaikos	22	8	4	10	25	27	−2	28	Qualification to Second Phase of Relegation
9	Kozani	22	6	8	8	17	22	−5	26	Qualification to Second Phase of Relegation
10	Sarakinos Volos	22	8	2	12	27	38	−11	26	Qualification to Second Phase of Relegation
11	Asteras Karditsa	22	5	6	11	28	43	−15	21	Qualification to Second Phase of Relegation
12	Evosmos	22	0	2	20	13	65	−52	2	Qualification to Second Phase of Relegation

Source: Hellenic Football Federation: 2025-26 Match Schedule (Group 2) (in Greek)
Rules for classification: 1) points; 2) head-to-head points; 3) head-to-head goal difference; 4) goal difference; 5) goals scored.

=== First Phase Results ===
Home \ Away	AKR	ALE	APK	AST	EOR	ERM	ENK	EVO	KOZ	PIE	SAR	VER
Akrites Sykies	—	2–0	2–4	4–2	4–0	1–0	1–1	1–1	4–0	0–1	2–0	2–1
Alexandreia	3–0	—	0–4	2–1	0–1	0–3	2–2	3–0	0–0	2–0	2–1	0–3
Apollon Kalamaria	2–0	3–0	—	3–0	2–0	3–1	0–1	5–0	0–0	1–0	4–1	2–0
Asteras Karditsa	2–0	2–2	0–1	—	1–1	2–5	3–3	2–1	0–0	1–0	1–2	3–2
Eordaikos	2–1	1–1	0–0	1–1	—	3–1	2–3	4–0	1–0	1–0	0–1	0–2
Ermis Exochi	0–0	1–3	0–0	5–1	2–1	—	2–1	1–1	0–0	3–1	4–1	1–1
Ethnikos Neo Keramidi	1–1	4–0	1–1	2–1	3–1	5–1	—	2–0	3–0	1–0	1–0	0–2
Evosmos	0–3	1–4	0–2	0–4	0–3	1–3	2–4	—	1–3	0–2	2–4	0–1
Kozani	1–1	1–0	0–2	0–0	1–0	0–1	2–3	3–0	—	1–2	1–1	1–2
Pierikos	1–0	0–2	0–2	3–0	2–1	1–0	1–1	4–1	0–0	—	3–2	0–0
Sarakinos Volos	1–0	1–0	0–3	4–1	1–2	1–2	0–4	2–1	0–1	3–1	—	0–0
Veria	1–0	0–0	0–3	2–0	1–0	3–0	2–3	4–1	1–2	1–0	3–1	—

Source: Hellenic Football Federation: 2025-26 Match Schedule (Group 2) (in Greek)
Legend: Blue = home team win; Yellow = draw; Red = away team win.

=== Second Phase Standings and Results ===
==== Promotion Group Standings ====
Pos	Team	Pld	W	D	L	GF	GA	GD	Pts	Promotion or relegation
1	Apollon Kalamaria (C, Q)	5	4	0	1	7	1	+6	67	Qualification to Third Phase of Promotion
2	Ethnikos Neo Keramidi (Q)	5	5	0	0	14	3	+11	63	Qualification to Third Phase of Promotion
3	Veria	5	2	1	2	6	4	+2	47	
4	Ermis Exochi	5	2	1	2	6	9	−3	42	
5	Alexandreia	5	1	0	4	3	9	−6	32	
6	Pierikos	5	0	0	5	1	11	−10	30	

Source: Hellenic Football Federation: 2025-26 Standings (Promotion Group 2) (in Greek)
Rules for classification: 1) points; 2) head-to-head points; 3) head-to-head goal difference; 4) goal difference; 5) goals scored.
(C) Champions; (Q) Qualified for the phase indicated

==== Promotion Group Results ====
Home \ Away	ALE	APK	ENK	ERM	PIE	VER
Alexandreia	—	0–3	1–3	—	—	—
Apollon Kalamaria	—	—	—	2–0	—	1–0
Ethnikos Neo Keramidi	—	1–0	—	5–2	4–0	—
Ermis Exochi	1–0	—	—	—	1–0	2–2
Pierikos	1–2	0–1	—	—	—	0–3
Veria	1–0	—	0–1	—	—	—

Source: Hellenic Football Federation: 2025-26 Match Schedule (Promotion Group 2) (in Greek)
Legend: Blue = home team win; Yellow = draw; Red = away team win.

==== Relegation Group Standings ====
Pos	Team	Pld	W	D	L	GF	GA	GD	Pts	Promotion or relegation
1	Akrites Sykies	5	2	1	2	5	8	−3	36	
2	Eordaikos	5	2	2	1	4	1	+3	36	
3	Sarakinos Volos	5	3	1	1	9	2	+7	36	
4	Kozani (R)	5	3	0	2	11	3	+8	35	Relegation to Local FCA Championships
5	Asteras Karditsa (R)	5	2	1	2	5	8	−3	28	Relegation to Local FCA Championships
6	Evosmos (R)	5	0	1	4	2	14	−12	3	Relegation to Local FCA Championships

Source: Hellenic Football Federation: 2025-26 Standings (Relegation Group 2) (in Greek)
Rules for classification: 1) points; 2) head-to-head points; 3) head-to-head goal difference; 4) goal difference; 5) goals scored.
(R) Relegated

==== Relegation Group Results ====
Home \ Away	AKR	AST	EOR	EVO	KOZ	SAR
Akrites Sykies	—	—	—	—	1–4	1–0
Asteras Karditsa	2–0	—	0–0	2–0	—	—
Eordaikos	0–1	—	—	—	—	0–0
Evosmos	2–2	—	0–3	—	0–5	—
Kozani	—	2–0	0–1	—	—	—
Sarakinos Volos	—	6–1	—	2–0	1–0	—

Source: Hellenic Football Federation: 2025-26 Match Schedule (Relegation Group 2) (in Greek)
Legend: Blue = home team win; Yellow = draw; Red = away team win.

== Group 3 ==
=== Teams ===
Location of teams in Group 3 of 2025-26 Gamma Ethniki

Team	Location	Last season
Anagennisi Arta	Arta	Group 2, 3rd
Anagennisi Schimatari	Schimatari	Boeotia FCA Champion
Anthoupoli	Larissa	Group 2, 6th
Aris Filiates	Filiates	Group 2, 10th
Asteras Stavros	Stavros	Group 3, 7th
Elassona	Elassona	Larissa FCA Champion
Lamia	Lamia	SL1, 14th, Relegated
Lefkimmi	Lefkimmi	Kerkyra FCA Champion
Nea Selefkia	Nea Selefkia	Thesprotia FCA Champion
Proodos Rogon	Preveza	Preveza FCA Champion
Tilikratis	Lefkada	Group 2, 4th
Thesprotos	Igoumenitsa	Group 2, 5th
Trikala	Trikala	Group 2, 7th

=== First Phase Standings ===
Pos	Team	Pld	W	D	L	GF	GA	GD	Pts	Promotion or relegation
1	Elassona	24	11	10	3	31	19	+12	43	Qualification to Second Phase of Promotion
2	Aris Filiates	24	12	7	5	33	19	+14	43	Qualification to Second Phase of Promotion
3	Trikala	24	11	10	3	35	18	+17	43	Qualification to Second Phase of Promotion
4	Asteras Stavros	24	11	7	6	36	28	+8	40	Qualification to Second Phase of Promotion
5	Lamia	23	8	12	3	33	17	+16	36	Qualification to Second Phase of Promotion
6	Tilikratis	24	9	8	7	25	22	+3	35	Qualification to Second Phase of Promotion
7	Anagennisi Arta	24	9	8	7	26	21	+5	35	Qualification to Second Phase of Relegation
8	Lefkimmi	24	10	3	11	31	31	0	33	Qualification to Second Phase of Relegation
9	Anagennisi Schimatari	24	9	5	10	25	24	+1	32	Qualification to Second Phase of Relegation
10	Anthoupoli	24	7	6	11	21	29	−8	27	Qualification to Second Phase of Relegation
11	Nea Selefkia	24	5	11	8	25	27	−2	26	Qualification to Second Phase of Relegation
12	Proodos Rogon	24	5	6	13	30	40	−10	21	Qualification to Second Phase of Relegation
13	Thesprotos (Note: Thesprotos was punished by the HFF Disciplinary Committee with a loss of the 3rd matchday against Anagennisi Schimatari, with a result of 0-3, as well as a penalty of 3 points deduction, due to not sufficient participation of juvenile football players. On January 2026 Thesprotos has been suspended from participating in Gamma Ethniki by the HFF and as a result they have been fined 300€ and demoted to amateur Local FCA Championships.) (R)	23	1	1	21	6	62	−56	−5	Withdrew

Source: Hellenic Football Federation: 2025-26 Match Schedule (Group 3) (in Greek)
Rules for classification: 1) points; 2) head-to-head points; 3) head-to-head goal difference; 4) goal difference; 5) goals scored.
(R) Relegated

=== First Phase Results ===
Home \ Away	ANA	ANS	ANT	ARF	ASS	ELA	LAM	LEF	NES	PRR	TIL	THE	TRI
Anagennisi Arta	—	1–0	1–0	1–1	0–0	1–0	1–1	2–0	1–1	0–1	0–2	4–0	2–0
Anagennisi Schimatari	2–2	—	1–0	1–3	2–1	3–1	0–0	2–1	2–2	2–0	2–0	3–0	0–1
Anthoupoli	0–0	0–1	—	0–3	1–2	1–1	1–0	3–1	0–0	3–1	0–1	2–0	1–4
Aris Filiates	1–0	2–0	1–0	—	1–0	2–2	1–1	1–0	2–0	2–2	0–1	3–0	1–0
Asteras Stavros	3–2	2–1	1–2	1–0	—	0–2	0–2	1–0	2–2	3–2	2–0	3–0	1–1
Elassona	1–1	1–0	1–0	1–0	2–2	—	1–1	3–1	2–1	2–1	0–0	3–1	1–1
Lamia	2–0	0–0	5–0	0–0	1–1	0–0	—	2–0	2–1	4–0	1–1	3–0	2–2
Lefkimmi	1–2	0–0	1–1	3–2	0–1	1–0	3–2	—	4–0	1–0	0–0	3–1	4–3
Nea Selefkia	0–0	1–0	1–1	2–2	1–2	0–1	0–0	1–2	—	2–0	1–2	3–0	0–0
Proodos Rogon	0–2	1–2	0–1	2–3	0–0	0–1	4–5	1–0	2–2	—	3–1	4–1	1–1
Tilikratis	2–0	2–0	1–1	1–0	3–3	1–1	0–2	1–2	0–1	1–1	—	3–0	0–2
Thesprotos	0–3	1–0	0–3	0–1	1–5	0–3	0–0	0–3	0–3	0–3	0–2	—	1–2
Trikala	3–0	2–1	2–0	1–1	2–0	1–1	1–0	2–0	0–0	1–1	0–0	3–0	—

Source: Hellenic Football Federation: 2025-26 Match Schedule (Group 3) (in Greek)
Legend: Blue = home team win; Yellow = draw; Red = away team win.

=== Second Phase Standings and Results ===
==== Promotion Group Standings ====
Pos	Team	Pld	W	D	L	GF	GA	GD	Pts	Promotion or relegation
1	Elassona (C, Q)	5	2	3	0	5	3	+2	52	Qualification to Third Phase of Promotion
2	Aris Filiates	5	1	2	2	3	3	0	48	
3	Trikala	5	0	3	2	1	3	−2	46	
4	Lamia	5	2	3	0	3	1	+2	45	
5	Asteras Stavros	5	1	2	2	4	7	−3	45	
6	Tilikratis	5	1	3	1	4	3	+1	41	

Source: Hellenic Football Federation: 2025-26 Standings (Promotion Group 3) (in Greek)
Rules for classification: 1) points; 2) head-to-head points; 3) head-to-head goal difference; 4) goal difference; 5) goals scored.
(C) Champions; (Q) Qualified for the phase indicated

==== Promotion Group Results ====
Home \ Away	ARF	ASS	ELA	LAM	TIL	TRI
Aris Filiates	—	3–0	0–1	—	—	—
Asteras Stavros	—	—	—	0–0	2–2	—
Elassona	—	2–1	—	—	1–1	0–0
Lamia	0–0	—	1–1	—	—	—
Tilikratis	2–0	—	—	0–1	—	1–1
Trikala	0–0	0–1	—	0–1	—	—

Source: Hellenic Football Federation: 2025-26 Match Schedule (Promotion Group 3) (in Greek)
Legend: Blue = home team win; Yellow = draw; Red = away team win.

==== Relegation Group Standings ====
Pos	Team	Pld	W	D	L	GF	GA	GD	Pts	Promotion or relegation
1	Lefkimmi	5	3	1	1	14	13	+1	43	
2	Anagennisi Arta	5	2	0	3	14	15	−1	41	
3	Anagennisi Schimatari	5	2	1	2	10	12	−2	39	
4	Anthoupoli	5	2	2	1	8	5	+3	35	
5	Nea Selefkia (R)	5	2	2	1	7	4	+3	34	Relegation to Local FCA Championships
6	Proodos Rogon (R)	5	1	0	4	11	15	−4	24	Relegation to Local FCA Championships

Source: Hellenic Football Federation: 2025-26 Standings (Relegation Group 3) (in Greek)
Rules for classification: 1) points; 2) head-to-head points; 3) head-to-head goal difference; 4) goal difference; 5) goals scored.
(R) Relegated

==== Relegation Group Results ====
Home \ Away	ANA	ANS	ANT	LEF	NES	PRR
Anagennisi Arta	—	—	2–1	5–1	0–3	—
Anagennisi Schimatari	3–2	—	—	—	2–2	—
Anthoupoli	—	3–1	—	2–2	—	2–0
Lefkimmi	—	4–2	—	—	2–1	5–3
Nea Selefkia	—	—	0–0	—	—	1–0
Proodos Rogon	7–5	1–2	—	—	—	—

Source: Hellenic Football Federation: 2025-26 Match Schedule (Relegation Group 3) (in Greek)
Legend: Blue = home team win; Yellow = draw; Red = away team win.

== Group 4 ==
=== Teams ===
Location of teams in Group 4 of 2025-26 Gamma Ethniki

Team	Location	Last season
Ermis Meligou	Himerini Meligou	Arcadia FCA Champion
Korinthos	Korinthos	Group 3, 2nd
Loutraki	Loutraki	Group 3, 5th
Miltiadis Pyrgos Trifilia	Pyrgos Trifilia	Group 3, 9th
Panachaiki	Patras	SL2 South Group, 10th, Relegated
Panegialios	Aigio	Group 3, 8th
Pangitheatikos	Gytheio	Group 3, 12th
Panthouriakos	Thouria	Messenia FCA Champion
Pelopas Kiato	Kiato	Corinthia FCA Champion
PAS Pyrgos	Pyrgos	Ilia FCA Champion
Thyella Patras	Patras	Achaia FCA Champion
Zakynthos	Zakynthos	Group 2, 8th

=== First Phase Standings ===
Pos	Team	Pld	W	D	L	GF	GA	GD	Pts	Promotion or relegation
1	PAS Pyrgos	22	18	2	2	45	7	+38	56	Qualification to Second Phase of Promotion
2	Zakynthos	22	16	4	2	47	11	+36	52	Qualification to Second Phase of Promotion
3	Panegialios	22	15	5	2	40	15	+25	50	Qualification to Second Phase of Promotion
4	Miltiadis Pyrgos Trifilia	22	9	6	7	32	23	+9	33	Qualification to Second Phase of Promotion
5	Korinthos	22	8	8	6	35	31	+4	32	Qualification to Second Phase of Promotion
6	Pelopas Kiato	22	9	2	11	20	32	−12	29	Qualification to Second Phase of Promotion
7	Panthouriakos	22	7	7	8	29	25	+4	28	Qualification to Second Phase of Relegation
8	Loutraki	22	8	4	10	18	18	0	28	Qualification to Second Phase of Relegation
9	Panachaiki	22	7	6	9	29	26	+3	27	Qualification to Second Phase of Relegation
10	Thyella Patras	22	5	6	11	20	30	−10	21	Qualification to Second Phase of Relegation
11	Ermis Meligou	22	2	4	16	13	40	−27	10	Qualification to Second Phase of Relegation
12	Pangitheatikos	22	0	2	20	8	78	−70	2	Qualification to Second Phase of Relegation

Source: Hellenic Football Federation: 2025-26 Match Schedule (Group 4) (in Greek)
Rules for classification: 1) points; 2) head-to-head points; 3) head-to-head goal difference; 4) goal difference; 5) goals scored.

=== First Phase Results ===
Home \ Away	ERM	KOR	LOU	MIL	PAN	PNE	PNG	PNT	PEL	PYR	THP	ZAK
Ermis Meligou	—	2–0	0–1	0–2	0–1	1–4	2–0	1–2	0–1	0–2	3–3	1–4
Korinthos	1–1	—	1–0	4–2	0–0	1–2	0–0	5–2	1–0	2–4	2–1	2–2
Loutraki	2–1	0–1	—	0–0	2–2	1–2	4–0	1–1	1–0	0–1	1–0	1–0
Miltiadis Pyrgos Trifilia	2–0	2–0	1–0	—	3–0	1–1	4–0	0–3	0–0	0–0	3–0	0–3
Panachaiki	3–0	1–4	1–0	4–2	—	0–1	3–1	1–1	1–3	0–1	1–2	1–1
Panegialios	1–0	3–0	0–0	1–1	1–0	—	5–0	1–0	1–0	1–1	1–0	2–2
Pangitheatikos	0–0	1–5	0–2	0–3	0–5	0–5	—	0–5	1–3	0–2	0–3	1–3
Panthouriakos	1–1	1–1	2–0	2–1	0–0	1–3	5–2	—	2–0	0–1	0–0	0–2
Pelopas Kiato	3–0	1–1	2–0	1–4	0–4	0–2	2–1	1–0	—	0–3	1–0	0–3
PAS Pyrgos	2–0	3–1	1–0	2–0	2–0	3–1	7–0	2–0	4–0	—	2–0	0–1
Thyella Patras	2–0	2–2	1–2	1–1	1–1	1–2	2–1	0–0	0–2	0–2	—	1–0
Zakynthos	3–0	1–1	1–0	1–0	1–0	2–0	8–0	2–1	3–0	1–0	3–0	—

Source: Hellenic Football Federation: 2025-26 Match Schedule (Group 4) (in Greek)
Legend: Blue = home team win; Yellow = draw; Red = away team win.

=== Second Phase Standings and Results ===
==== Promotion Group Standings ====
Pos	Team	Pld	W	D	L	GF	GA	GD	Pts	Promotion or relegation
1	PAS Pyrgos (C, Q)	5	3	1	1	12	5	+7	66	Qualification to Third Phase of Promotion
2	Zakynthos (Q)	5	3	1	1	11	4	+7	62	Qualification to Third Phase of Promotion
3	Panegialios	5	3	2	0	6	0	+6	61	
4	Korinthos	5	2	1	2	6	8	−2	39	
5	Miltiadis Pyrgos Trifilia	5	0	1	4	2	13	−11	34	
6	Pelopas Kiato	5	0	2	3	2	9	−7	31	

Source: Hellenic Football Federation: 2025-26 Standings (Promotion Group 4) (in Greek)
Rules for classification: 1) points; 2) head-to-head points; 3) head-to-head goal difference; 4) goal difference; 5) goals scored.
(C) Champions; (Q) Qualified for the phase indicated

==== Promotion Group Results ====
Home \ Away	KOR	MIL	PNE	PEL	PYR	ZAK
Korinthos	—	2–0	—	1–0	3–3	—
Miltiadis Pyrgos Trifilia	—	—	0–3	—	—	1–3
Panegialios	2–0	—	—	—	1–0	0–0
Pelopas Kiato	—	0–0	0–0	—	—	—
PAS Pyrgos	—	5–1	—	3–0	—	1–0
Zakynthos	3–0	—	—	5–2	—	—

Source: Hellenic Football Federation: 2025-26 Match Schedule (Promotion Group 4) (in Greek)
Legend: Blue = home team win; Yellow = draw; Red = away team win.

==== Relegation Group Standings ====
Pos	Team	Pld	W	D	L	GF	GA	GD	Pts	Promotion or relegation
1	Panachaiki	5	3	1	1	19	4	+15	37	
2	Panthouriakos	5	3	0	2	13	7	+6	37	
3	Loutraki	5	2	2	1	11	6	+5	36	
4	Thyella Patras (R)	5	4	1	0	10	2	+8	34	Relegation to Local FCA Championships
5	Ermis Meligou (R)	5	1	0	4	8	9	−1	13	Relegation to Local FCA Championships
6	Pangitheatikos (R)	5	0	0	5	0	34	−34	2	Relegation to Local FCA Championships

Source: Hellenic Football Federation: 2025-26 Standings (Relegation Group 4) (in Greek)
Rules for classification: 1) points; 2) head-to-head points; 3) head-to-head goal difference; 4) goal difference; 5) goals scored.
(R) Relegated

==== Relegation Group Results ====
Home \ Away	ERM	LOU	PAN	PNG	PNT	THP
Ermis Meligou	—	—	0–3	7–0	—	1–2
Loutraki	1–0	—	—	7–0	—	—
Panachaiki	—	2–2	—	10–0	4–1	—
Pangitheatikos	—	—	—	—	0–6	0–4
Panthouriakos	3–1	3–0	—	—	—	—
Thyella Patras	—	1–1	1–0	—	2–0	—

Source: Hellenic Football Federation: 2025-26 Match Schedule (Relegation Group 4) (in Greek)
Legend: Blue = home team win; Yellow = draw; Red = away team win.

== Group 5 ==
=== Teams ===
Location of teams in Group 5 of 2025-26 Gamma Ethniki

Team	Location	Last season
AER Afantou	Afantou	Group 3, 10th
Amarynthiakos	Amarynthos	Group 3, 11th
Apollon Kalythies	Kalythies	Dodecanese FCA Champion
Aris Petroupolis	Petroupoli	Group 4, 5th
Ethnikos Asteras	Kaisariani	Group 4, 8th
Diagoras	Rhodes	SL2 North Group, 9th, Relegated
Doxa Vyronas	Vyronas	Athens FCA Group 2 Champion
Karystos	Karystos	Euboea FCA Champion
Kentavros Vrilissia	Vrilissia	Athens FCA Group 1 Champion
Nea Artaki	Nea Artaki	Group 3, 3rd
Nea Ionia	Nea Ionia	Group 4, 3rd
Rodos	Rhodes	Group 3, 6th

=== First Phase Standings ===
Pos	Team	Pld	W	D	L	GF	GA	GD	Pts	Promotion or relegation
1	Aris Petroupolis	22	15	6	1	36	11	+25	51	Qualification to Second Phase of Promotion
2	Nea Artaki	22	13	8	1	26	8	+18	47	Qualification to Second Phase of Promotion
3	Diagoras	22	9	8	5	28	15	+13	35	Qualification to Second Phase of Promotion
4	Karystos	22	9	8	5	22	12	+10	35	Qualification to Second Phase of Promotion
5	AER Afantou	22	9	5	8	25	24	+1	32	Qualification to Second Phase of Promotion
6	Ethnikos Asteras	22	9	5	8	32	26	+6	32	Qualification to Second Phase of Promotion
7	Nea Ionia	22	9	4	9	23	23	0	31	Qualification to Second Phase of Relegation
8	Doxa Vyronas	22	8	7	7	32	21	+11	31	Qualification to Second Phase of Relegation
9	Apollon Kalythies	22	9	4	9	32	31	+1	31	Qualification to Second Phase of Relegation
10	Kentavros Vrilissia	22	8	3	11	27	30	−3	27	Qualification to Second Phase of Relegation
11	Amarynthiakos	22	4	2	16	20	36	−16	14	Qualification to Second Phase of Relegation
12	Rodos (Note: Rodos was expelled from the championship after three zeroes in home games against AER Afantou (21/09/2025), Apollon Kalythies (12/10/2025) and Amarynthiakos (25/10/2025).) (R)	22	0	0	22	0	66	−66	0	Expelled

Source: Hellenic Football Federation: 2025-26 Match Schedule (Group 5) (in Greek)
Rules for classification: 1) points; 2) head-to-head points; 3) head-to-head goal difference; 4) goal difference; 5) goals scored.
(R) Relegated

=== First Phase Results ===
Home \ Away	AER	AMA	APK	APE	ASK	DIA	DOV	KAR	KEN	NAR	NIO	ROD
AER Afantou	—	3–1	3–4	0–0	3–0	1–1	0–1	1–0	1–0	0–0	1–1	3–0
Amarynthiakos	0–1	—	1–2	0–1	0–1	1–0	1–0	1–1	1–0	1–2	0–1	3–0
Apollon Kalythies	2–0	4–2	—	0–1	2–1	3–2	0–0	0–2	3–2	1–1	1–2	3–0
Aris Petroupolis	4–1	1–0	2–0	—	4–0	0–3	2–1	1–0	2–0	0–0	3–1	3–0
Ethnikos Asteras	3–1	2–1	3–3	1–1	—	2–2	2–1	0–0	5–1	3–0	0–1	3–0
Diagoras	0–1	3–1	2–1	0–0	1–0	—	2–2	1–0	0–0	1–2	2–0	3–0
Doxa Vyronas	4–2	7–1	0–0	1–2	2–1	0–0	—	2–3	2–1	3–0	0–1	3–0
Karystos	0–0	1–0	1–0	0–0	1–0	0–0	0–0	—	0–2	0–2	2–1	3–0
Kentavros Vrilissia	2–0	1–0	3–0	3–4	1–1	0–1	2–1	0–4	—	1–2	2–0	3–0
Nea Artaki	1–0	1–0	2–0	0–0	1–0	1–0	1–0	1–1	0–0	—	0–0	3–0
Nea Ionia	0–1	3–1	1–0	0–2	0–1	1–1	0–1	0–0	3–0	1–4	—	3–0
Rodos	0–3	0–3	0–3	0–3	0–3	0–3	0–3	0–3	0–3	0–3	0–3	—

Source: Hellenic Football Federation: 2025-26 Match Schedule (Group 5) (in Greek)
Legend: Blue = home team win; Yellow = draw; Red = away team win.

=== Second Phase Standings and Results ===
==== Promotion Group Standings ====
Pos	Team	Pld	W	D	L	GF	GA	GD	Pts	Promotion or relegation
1	Aris Petroupolis (C, Q)	5	4	0	1	8	3	+5	63	Qualification to Third Phase of Promotion
2	Nea Artaki	5	3	0	2	6	4	+2	56	
3	Karystos	5	3	1	1	7	5	+2	45	
4	Diagoras	5	2	1	2	6	8	−2	42	
5	Ethnikos Asteras	5	1	1	3	5	5	0	36	
6	AER Afantou	5	0	1	4	7	14	−7	33	

Source: Hellenic Football Federation: 2025-26 Standings (Promotion Group 5) (in Greek)
Rules for classification: 1) points; 2) head-to-head points; 3) head-to-head goal difference; 4) goal difference; 5) goals scored.
(C) Champions; (Q) Qualified for the phase indicated

==== Promotion Group Results ====
Home \ Away	AER	APE	ASK	DIA	KAR	NAR
AER Afantou	—	—	1–1	1–2	—	2–4
Aris Petroupolis	4–2	—	—	—	2–0	—
Ethnikos Asteras	—	0–1	—	4–1	—	—
Diagoras	—	0–1	—	—	2–2	1–0
Karystos	3–1	—	1–0	—	—	—
Nea Artaki	—	1–0	1–0	—	0–1	—

Source: Hellenic Football Federation: 2025-26 Match Schedule (Promotion Group 5) (in Greek)
Legend: Blue = home team win; Yellow = draw; Red = away team win.

==== Relegation Group Standings ====
Pos	Team	Pld	W	D	L	GF	GA	GD	Pts	Promotion or relegation
1	Doxa Vyronas	4	2	2	0	4	1	+3	39	
2	Nea Ionia	4	2	0	2	5	7	−2	37	
3	Apollon Kalythies	4	1	2	1	3	4	−1	36	
4	Kentavros Vrilissia (R)	4	2	2	0	7	1	+6	35	Relegation to Local FCA Championships
5	Amarynthiakos (R)	4	0	0	4	0	6	−6	14	Relegation to Local FCA Championships

Source: Hellenic Football Federation: 2025-26 Standings (Relegation Group 5) (in Greek)
Rules for classification: 1) points; 2) head-to-head points; 3) head-to-head goal difference; 4) goal difference; 5) goals scored.
(R) Relegated

==== Relegation Group Results ====
Home \ Away	AMA	APK	DOV	KEN	NIO
Amarynthiakos	—	—	0–2	0–2	—
Apollon Kalythies	1–0	—	—	0–0	—
Doxa Vyronas	—	0–0	—	—	1–0
Kentavros Vrilissia	—	—	1–1	—	4–0
Nea Ionia	1–0	4–2	—	—	—

Source: Hellenic Football Federation: 2025-26 Match Schedule (Relegation Group 5) (in Greek)
Legend: Blue = home team win; Yellow = draw; Red = away team win.

== Group 6 ==
=== Teams ===
Location of teams in Group 6 of 2025-26 Gamma Ethniki

Team	Location	Last season
Aias Salamina	Salamina	Piraeus FCA Group 2 Champion
Asteras Vari	Vari	Group 3, 10th
Atsalenios	Heraklion (Atsalenio neighborhood)	Group 4, 6th
Ethnikos Piraeus	Piraeus	Group 4, 2nd
Giouchtas	Archanes	Group 4, 9th
Granitis Agia Marina	Agia Marina	Chania FCA Champion
Haidari	Haidari	Group 4, 4th
Ilisiakos	Athens (Ilisia neighborhood)	Group 4, 7th
Ionikos	Nikaia	Piraeus FCA Group 1 Champion
Mykonos	Mykonos	Group 3, 4th
Saronikos Anavyssos	Anavyssos	East Attica FCA Champion
Thyella Rafina	Rafina	Group 4, 11th

=== First Phase Standings ===
Pos	Team	Pld	W	D	L	GF	GA	GD	Pts	Promotion or relegation
1	Ethnikos Piraeus	22	14	7	1	32	17	+15	49	Qualification to Second Phase of Promotion
2	Ionikos	22	11	6	5	25	20	+5	39	Qualification to Second Phase of Promotion
3	Saronikos Anavyssos	22	11	5	6	26	16	+10	38	Qualification to Second Phase of Promotion
4	Mykonos	22	11	4	7	30	25	+5	37	Qualification to Second Phase of Promotion
5	Asteras Vari	22	10	6	6	32	23	+9	36	Qualification to Second Phase of Promotion
6	Thyella Rafina	22	9	6	7	26	20	+6	33	Qualification to Second Phase of Promotion
7	Atsalenios	22	8	5	9	25	25	0	29	Qualification to Second Phase of Relegation
8	Giouchtas	22	8	4	10	30	30	0	28	Qualification to Second Phase of Relegation
9	Ilisiakos	22	7	6	9	25	29	−4	27	Qualification to Second Phase of Relegation
10	Haidari	22	7	3	12	24	26	−2	24	Qualification to Second Phase of Relegation
11	Aias Salamina	22	6	3	13	20	28	−8	21	Qualification to Second Phase of Relegation
12	Granitis Agia Marina	22	1	3	18	13	49	−36	6	Qualification to Second Phase of Relegation

Source: Hellenic Football Federation: 2025-26 Match Schedule (Group 6) (in Greek)
Rules for classification: 1) points; 2) head-to-head points; 3) head-to-head goal difference; 4) goal difference; 5) goals scored.

=== First Phase Results ===
Home \ Away	AIS	ASV	ATS	ETH	GIO	GRA	HAI	ILI	ION	MYK	SAR	THR
Aias Salamina	—	0–1	2–0	0–1	2–0	4–0	0–4	3–0	0–1	1–2	0–2	2–1
Asteras Vari	3–2	—	1–0	0–0	3–2	2–0	1–1	0–0	3–1	2–1	0–1	4–2
Atsalenios	2–0	1–1	—	0–0	1–0	4–1	1–0	2–2	1–1	2–0	0–2	2–2
Ethnikos Piraeus	1–0	1–1	1–0	—	1–1	2–0	1–0	3–2	2–0	2–2	1–0	2–1
Giouchtas	5–0	1–3	1–0	2–3	—	1–1	1–0	1–0	1–1	1–2	2–2	1–0
Granitis Agia Marina	0–0	2–1	0–3	2–3	1–2	—	1–3	1–3	0–2	0–1	0–3	0–0
Haidari	0–2	0–2	0–2	1–2	3–1	2–1	—	3–1	0–0	2–0	0–1	0–2
Ilisiakos	2–2	0–0	1–2	1–2	1–5	3–0	1–0	—	2–0	2–1	1–0	0–0
Ionikos	1–0	1–0	2–1	3–1	1–0	3–0	1–0	0–2	—	2–1	1–1	1–0
Mykonos	1–0	3–2	2–1	1–1	2–0	3–2	1–1	2–0	3–1	—	1–2	1–0
Saronikos Anavyssos	1–0	2–1	2–0	0–2	0–1	1–0	2–3	1–1	1–1	0–0	—	2–0
Thyella Rafina	0–0	2–1	4–0	0–0	3–1	3–1	2–1	1–0	1–1	1–0	1–0	—

Source: Hellenic Football Federation: 2025-26 Match Schedule (Group 6) (in Greek)
Legend: Blue = home team win; Yellow = draw; Red = away team win.

=== Second Phase Standings and Results ===
==== Promotion Group Standings ====
Pos	Team	Pld	W	D	L	GF	GA	GD	Pts	Promotion or relegation
1	Ethnikos Piraeus (C, Q)	5	2	3	0	5	1	+4	58	Qualification to Third Phase of Promotion
2	Ionikos	5	1	3	1	5	6	−1	45	
3	Asteras Vari	5	1	4	0	3	2	+1	43	
4	Mykonos	5	1	3	1	4	4	0	43	
5	Saronikos Anavyssos	5	1	1	3	4	7	−3	42	
6	Thyella Rafina	5	1	2	2	5	6	−1	38	

Source: Hellenic Football Federation: 2025-26 Standings (Promotion Group 6) (in Greek)
Rules for classification: 1) points; 2) head-to-head points; 3) head-to-head goal difference; 4) goal difference; 5) goals scored.
(C) Champions; (Q) Qualified for the phase indicated

==== Promotion Group Results ====
Home \ Away	ASV	ETH	ION	MYK	SAR	THR
Asteras Vari	—	—	1–1	0–0	1–0	—
Ethnikos Piraeus	0–0	—	1–1	—	—	2–0
Ionikos	—	—	—	—	1–1	0–2
Mykonos	—	0–0	1–2	—	—	—
Saronikos Anavyssos	—	0–2	—	1–2	—	—
Thyella Rafina	1–1	—	—	1–1	1–2	—

Source: Hellenic Football Federation: 2025-26 Match Schedule (Promotion Group 6) (in Greek)
Legend: Blue = home team win; Yellow = draw; Red = away team win.

==== Relegation Group Standings ====
Pos	Team	Pld	W	D	L	GF	GA	GD	Pts	Promotion or relegation
1	Giouchtas	5	3	1	1	11	6	+5	38	
2	Atsalenios	5	2	1	2	7	5	+2	36	
3	Ilisiakos	5	3	0	2	9	5	+4	36	
4	Haidari (R)	5	2	2	1	8	6	+2	32	Relegation to Local FCA Championships
5	Aias Salamina (R)	5	0	0	5	2	14	−12	21	Relegation to Local FCA Championships
6	Granitis Agia Marina (R)	5	2	2	1	7	8	−1	14	Relegation to Local FCA Championships

Source: Hellenic Football Federation: 2025-26 Standings (Relegation Group 6) (in Greek)
Rules for classification: 1) points; 2) head-to-head points; 3) head-to-head goal difference; 4) goal difference; 5) goals scored.
(R) Relegated

==== Relegation Group Results ====
Home \ Away	AIS	ATS	GIO	GRA	HAI	ILI
Aias Salamina	—	0–1	—	—	—	0–3
Atsalenios	—	—	4–0	0–0	—	1–2
Giouchtas	5–0	—	—	4–1	1–1	—
Granitis Agia Marina	2–1	—	—	—	1–1	3–2
Haidari	3–1	3–1	—	—	—	—
Ilisiakos	—	—	0–1	—	2–0	—

Source: Hellenic Football Federation: 2025-26 Match Schedule (Relegation Group 6) (in Greek)
Legend: Blue = home team win; Yellow = draw; Red = away team win.

== Third Phase of Promotion ==
=== Group 1 ===
==== Standings ====
Pos	Team	Pld	W	D	L	GF	GA	GD	Pts	Promotion or relegation
1	Apollon Kalamaria (P)	6	4	1	1	10	7	+3	13	Promotion to Super League 2
2	Panthrakikos (P)	6	4	0	2	13	6	+7	12	Promotion to Super League 2
3	Ethnikos Neo Keramidi	6	2	0	4	11	14	−3	6	
4	Elassona	6	1	1	4	6	13	−7	4	

Source: Hellenic Football Federation: 2025-26 Match Schedule (Third Phase Promotion Group 1) (in Greek)
Rules for classification: 1) points; 2) head-to-head points; 3) head-to-head goal difference; 4) goal difference; 5) goals scored.
(P) Promoted

==== Results ====
Home \ Away	APK	ELA	ENK	PAN
Apollon Kalamaria	—	2–1	3–2	2–0
Elassona	0–0	—	2–3	0–2
Ethnikos Neo Keramidi	2–3	1–2	—	3–2
Panthrakikos	2–0	5–1	2–0	—

Source: Hellenic Football Federation: 2025-26 Match Schedule (Third Phase Promotion Group 1) (in Greek)
Legend: Blue = home team win; Yellow = draw; Red = away team win.

=== Group 2 ===
==== Standings ====
Pos	Team	Pld	W	D	L	GF	GA	GD	Pts	Promotion or relegation
1	Zakynthos (P)	6	3	2	1	8	4	+4	11	Promotion to Super League 2
2	PAS Pyrgos (P)	6	2	2	2	4	7	−3	8	Promotion to Super League 2
3	Aris Petroupolis	6	2	2	2	4	4	0	8	
4	Ethnikos Piraeus	6	1	2	3	3	4	−1	5	

Source: Hellenic Football Federation: 2025-26 Match Schedule (Third Phase Promotion Group 2) (in Greek)
Rules for classification: 1) points; 2) head-to-head points; 3) head-to-head goal difference; 4) goal difference; 5) goals scored.
(P) Promoted

==== Results ====
Home \ Away	APE	ETH	PYR	ZAK
Aris Petroupolis	—	1–0	1–2	1–0
Ethnikos Piraeus	0–0	—	2–0	0–1
PAS Pyrgos	1–0	0–0	—	0–3 (Note: The match was awarded 0–3 to Zakynthos following a disciplinary decision, after it had been abandoned due to objects being thrown that caused injury to a Zakynthos player.)
Zakynthos	1–1	2–1	1–1	—

Source: Hellenic Football Federation: 2025-26 Match Schedule (Third Phase Promotion Group 2) (in Greek)
Legend: Blue = home team win; Yellow = draw; Red = away team win.
