= Aris Petroupolis F.C. =

Aris Petroupolis
- Full name: Aris Petroupolis Athens FC
- Founded: 1926; 100 years ago
- Ground: Alkyon Ground, Petroupoli
- Capacity: 1000
- Chairman: Dimitrios Kostopoulos
- Manager: Dionysis Sassalos
- League: Athens FCA First Division
- 2025–26: Gamma Ethniki (Group 5), 1st (withdrew)
Home colours	Away colours

Aris Petroupolis is a Greek football club based in Petroupoli, Athens. Its colors are red and yellow. It is one of the oldest football clubs of the Athens Football Association, with registration number 9, having been a member since 1926.

The club was created in its current form in 1966, when Aris Athens moved to Petroupoli, which had originated in 1946 from the merger of the old clubs Olympiacos Athens(founded in 1926) and Atlas Thymaraki (founded in 1928). Aris Petroupolis football team, have competed for 13 seasons in the 4th National League. Aris competes currently in Athens FCA First Division, the fourth highest tier in Greek Football League system.

== Other departments ==
=== Basketball ===
The basketball department of Aris Petroupolis was created in 1976. It has the title of Aris Petroupolis Athletic Club and has become independent from the football club. It maintains competitive departments: men's, women's, teenagers, youth, boys, girls, boys', girls' and Academies. The total number of athletes employed reaches 400 people. It uses the Petroupoli Indoor Gymnasium, the Agia Triada Indoor Gymnasium and the Agios Dimitrios Open Stadium.

=== Rugby league ===
The Aris Petroupoli rugby league department was a member of the Hellenic Federation of Rugby League. In the past, the team had competed in the Greek Men's Rugby League Championship.
