= Stergios Dimopoulos =

Greek professional footballer

Personal information
- Date of birth: 20 May 1990 (age 36)
- Place of birth: Karditsa, Greece
- Height: 1.85 m (6 ft 1 in)
- Position: Centre-back

Team information
- Current team: Sarakinos Volos

Youth career
- 2006–2009: Anagennisi Karditsa

Senior career*
Years	Team	Apps	(Gls)
2009–2012	Anagennisi Karditsa	2	(0)
2012–2013	AEL	6	(0)
2013–2017	Anagennisi Karditsa	81	(0)
2017–2020	Volos	54	(5)
2021	Levadiakos	11	(1)
2021–2022	Veria	20	(0)
2022–2023	Anagennisi Karditsa	21	(1)
2023–2024	Kalamata	6	(0)
2024–2025	Diagoras	36	(2)
2025–	Sarakinos Volos		
- * Club domestic league appearances and goals as of 15 June 2025

Stergios Dimopoulos (Greek: Στέργιος Δημόπουλος; born 20 May 1990) is a Greek professional footballer who plays as a centre-back for Gamma Ethniki club Sarakinos Volos.

== Career ==
Dimopoulos played for Anagennisi Karditsa's youth teams from 2006 to 2009, until he moved to the first team. On 25 July 2012 he signed a 1+2 years contract with AEL.

== Honours ==
Anagennisi Karditsa

- Delta Ethniki: 2011–12

Volos

- Gamma Ethniki: 2017–18
- Football League: 2018–19
