= Theodoros Chiritrantas =

Greek footballer (born 2000)

Personal information
- Date of birth: 10 November 2000 (age 25)
- Place of birth: Thessaloniki, Greece
- Height: 1.75 m (5 ft 9 in)
- Position: Right-back

Team information
- Current team: Iraklis Thermaikos

Senior career*
Years	Team	Apps	(Gls)
2017–2019	Agrotikos Asteras	44	(3)
2019–2021	Apollon Smyrnis	0	(0)
2020	→ Ialysos (loan)	9	(1)
2021–2022	Trikala	24	(0)
2022–2024	Iraklis	32	(1)
2024–2025	Anagennisi Karditsas		
2025–	Iraklis Thermaikos		
- * Club domestic league appearances and goals as of 5 August 2024

Theodoros Chiritrantas (Greek: Θεόδωρος Χειρίτραντας; born 10 November 2000) is a Greek professional footballer who plays as a right-back for Gamma Ethniki club Iraklis Thermaikos.
