= Neti Meçe =

Albanian footballer

Personal information
- Full name: Nesat Meçe
- Date of birth: 11 August 1995 (age 31)
- Place of birth: Ersekë, Albania
- Height: 1.84 m (6 ft 0 in)
- Position: Midfielder

Team information
- Current team: Sarakinos Volos

Youth career
- –2014: Niki Volos

Senior career*
Years	Team	Apps	(Gls)
2014–2019	Niki Volos	8	(0)
2019–2020	Karaiskakis	19	(1)
2020–2023	Niki Volos	56	(3)
2024–2025	Kavala	17	(0)
2025–2026	Trikala		
2026–	Sarakinos Volos		

International career^{‡}
2014	Albania U21	1	(0)
- * Club domestic league appearances and goals as of 16 June 2025 ‡ National team caps and goals as of 16 November 2014

Nesat "Neti" Meçe (born 8 November 1995) is an Albanian professional footballer who plays as a midfielder for Gamma Ethniki club Sarakinos Volos.

== Career statistics ==
=== Club ===
As of 13 September 2020

Season	Club	League country	League		Domestic Cup		Europe		Total	
Season	Club	League country	Apps	Goals	Apps	Goals	Apps	Goals	Apps	Goals
2014–15	Niki Volos	Super League Greece	6	0	0	0	-	-	6	0
Total			6	0	0	0	0	0	6	0
Career total			6	0	0	0	0	0	6	0
