= Giannis Tsakirakis =

Greek footballer

Personal information
- Full name: Giannis Tsakirakis
- Date of birth: 1 April 1992 (age 34)
- Place of birth: , Greece
- Position: Defender

Senior career*
Years	Team	Apps	(Gls)
2010–2012	Ilisiakos	2	(0)
2012–2013	A.O Pefki	0	(0)
2013–2014	Vyzas Megaron	14	(1)
2014–	Doxa Vyrona		
- * Club domestic league appearances and goals as of 19 August 2014

Giannis Tsakirakis (Greek: Γιάννης Τσακιράκης; born 1 April 1992) is a football player.
