= Akrites Sykies F.C. =

Association football club in Greece

Akrites Sykies
- Full name: Podosfairiki Athlitiki Enosi Akrites Sykies
- Founded: 27 February 1939; 87 years ago
- Ground: Sykies Municipal Stadium
- Capacity: 600
- Chairman: Nikolaos Iakovidis
- Manager: Nikolaos Mintis
- League: Gamma Ethniki
- 2025–26: Gamma Ethniki (Group 2), 7th
Home colours	Away colours

Podosfairiki Athlitiki Enosi Akrites Sykies (Greek: Ποδοσφαιρική Αθλητική Ένωση Ακρίτες Συκεών) is a Greek football club based in Sykies, Thessaloniki. The official foundation year of the club is 1939, and its official colors are blue and white.

== History ==
=== Foundation and continuation ===
The historic football club of Sykies was officially founded on 27 February 1939 under the name Athlitikos Podosfairikos Omilos "Akrites Sykies". In 1946, A.P.S. Akrites Sykies was officially recognized by the Hellenic Football Federation with registration number 181 and joined the Macedonia FCA strength, beginning its competitive journey. In 2000, it merged with "Toxotis Sykies", "Kolokotronis Sykies", "Ethnikos Sykies", and the football department of "Panathlitikos Sykies", being renamed to Podosfairiki Athlitiki Enosi "Akrites Sykies" with the objective of giving the city of Sykies a team that would play a leading role in football.

=== Later years ===
The first participation of Akrites Sykies in an official championship following its recognition by the HFF was recorded in the 1946–47 season, marking the start of the historic Sykies club's official competitive journey in the Macedonia FCA Third Division. The team continued competing between the Third and Second Divisions, and in the 1955–56 season, Akrites Sykies played in the Macedonia FCA First Division for the first time, facing PAOK, Aris, Iraklis, and Apollon Kalamarias. On 22 January 1960, the club created a major upset by eliminating top-tier Apollon Kalamarias from the Greek Cup with a 1–0 victory.

In the 1974–75 season, the club won the Macedonia FCA First Division championship for the first time in its history and qualified for the special promotion tournament. Following a 2–1 victory in the play-off match against Niki Polygyros in Veria, it claimed 1st place in the 1st group out of 7 teams and earned historic promotion to the Beta Ethniki, where it competed in the 1975–76 season. In 1979, Akrites Sykies defeated Kampaniakos 1–0 in the Macedonia FCA Cup final held at the Polichni Stadium and won the cup.

In the following years, Akrites Sykeon stood out with their presence in the National Amateur Division during the 1979–80, 1980–81, and 1981–82 seasons. The club also participated in the Delta Ethniki championship for 5 consecutive seasons, specifically from 1982–83 through 1986–87, as well as in 1990–91, 1991–92, and 1992–93.

In the 2024–25 season, the club won the Macedonia FCA championship and took part in the special promotion tournament, where it earned promotion to the national divisions after 32 years. In the 2025–26 season, it finished in 7th place in Group 2 of Gamma Ethniki.

== Crest and colours ==
The club's colors are blue and white, and its crest features an Akritas bearing a spear and shield, inspired by the Akritai of Cappadocia and defenders of the Byzantine borders.

== Honours ==
=== Regional ===
- Macedonia FCA First Division
  - Winners (4): 1974–75, 1978–79, 1997–98, 2024–25
- Macedonia FCA Cup
  - Winners (1): 1978–79
