= Asteras Karditsa F.C. =

Association football club in Greece

Asteras Karditsa
- Full name: Athlitikos Omilos Asteras Karditsa
- Founded: 1980; 46 years ago
- Ground: Asteras Karditsa Ground
- Chairman: Vissarion Siourtos
- Manager: Makis Rizogiannis
- League: Karditsa FCA First Division
- 2025–26: Gamma Ethniki (Group 2), 11th (relegated)
Home colours	Away colours

Athlitikos Omilos Asteras Karditsa (Greek: Αθλητικός Όμιλος Αστέρας Καρδίτσας) is a Greek football club based in Karditsa, Thessaly. The official foundation year of the club is 1980, and its official colors are red and black.

== History ==
Asteras was founded in 1980 and belongs to the Karditsa FCA. The club's first appearance in Delta Ethniki was during the 1991–92 season, when it suffered relegation. It competed in Delta Ethniki once again in 2005–06, and continuously during the 2007–08 and 2008–09 seasons.

In the 2024–25 season, the club won the Karditsa FCA Championship and secured a historic promotion to Gamma Ethniki through the special promotion tournament, which stands as the highest achievement in the club's history.

During the 2025–26 season, Asteras competed in Gamma Ethniki, securing two historic victories against teams with more than 15 appearances in the top tier: a 1–0 home win against Pierikos and a 3–2 home win against Veria. Despite a competitive presence, the club was unable to maintain its place in the division and was relegated after a single season in the national categories.

== Honours ==
=== Regional ===
- Karditsa FCA First Division
  - Winners (8): 1987–88, 1990–91, 2000–01, 2004–05, 2006–07, 2021–22, 2022–23, 2024–25
- Karditsa FCA Cup
  - Winners (1): 1993–94
