= 1975–76 Beta Ethniki =

Beta Ethniki
- Season: 1975–76
- Dates: 28 September 1975 – 27 June 1976
- Champions: OFI (South); Kavala (North)
- Promoted: OFI; Kavala
- Relegated: Ionikos; Agios Dimitrios; AE Amfiali; Akrites Sykies; Chalkida; Rigas Feraios

Beta Ethniki 1975–76 complete season.

== South Group ==
=== League table ===
| Pos | Team | Pld | W | D | L | GF | GA | GD | Pts | Promotion or relegation |
|---|---|---|---|---|---|---|---|---|---|---|
| 1 | OFI (C, P) | 38 | 23 | 6 | 9 | 60 | 38 | +22 | 52 | Promotion to Alpha Ethniki |
| 2 | Panarkadikos | 38 | 19 | 7 | 12 | 54 | 39 | +15 | 45 | |
| 3 | Proodeftiki | 38 | 15 | 12 | 11 | 42 | 37 | +5 | 42 | |
| 4 | Egaleo | 38 | 15 | 11 | 12 | 43 | 33 | +10 | 41 | |
| 5 | Rodos | 38 | 19 | 9 | 10 | 73 | 48 | +25 | 40 (Note: ?7 points deducted?) | |
| 6 | Ilisiakos | 38 | 14 | 10 | 14 | 43 | 40 | +3 | 38 | |
| 7 | Fostiras | 38 | 16 | 6 | 16 | 41 | 46 | −5 | 38 | |
| 8 | Kalamata | 38 | 15 | 7 | 16 | 46 | 46 | 0 | 37 | |
| 9 | Korinthos | 38 | 10 | 16 | 12 | 39 | 35 | +4 | 36 | |
| 10 | AFC Patra | 38 | 13 | 10 | 15 | 39 | 41 | −2 | 36 | |
| 11 | Koropi | 38 | 12 | 12 | 14 | 31 | 33 | −2 | 36 | |
| 12 | Chania | 38 | 13 | 10 | 15 | 34 | 42 | −8 | 36 | |
| 13 | Atromitos Piraeus | 38 | 13 | 10 | 15 | 37 | 46 | −9 | 36 | |
| 14 | Orfeas Egaleo | 38 | 14 | 8 | 16 | 46 | 57 | −11 | 36 | |
| 15 | Ethnikos Asteras | 38 | 10 | 15 | 13 | 43 | 40 | +3 | 35 | |
| 16 | Olympiacos Liosia | 38 | 12 | 11 | 15 | 37 | 48 | −11 | 35 | |
| 17 | Panelefsiniakos | 38 | 15 | 12 | 11 | 33 | 26 | +7 | 34 (Note: Panelefsiniakos had 8 points deducted.) | |
| 18 | Ionikos (R) | 38 | 13 | 9 | 16 | 45 | 48 | −3 | 32 (Note: Ionikos and Agios Dimitrios had 3 points deducted.) | Relegation to C National Amateur Division |
| 19 | Agios Dimitrios (R) | 38 | 9 | 8 | 21 | 39 | 61 | −22 | 26 | Relegation to C National Amateur Division |
| 20 | AE Amfiali (R) | 38 | 9 | 11 | 18 | 31 | 52 | −21 | 26 | Relegation to C National Amateur Division |

(C) Champions; (P) Promoted; (R) Relegated

== North Group ==
=== League table ===
| Pos | Team | Pld | W | D | L | GF | GA | GD | Pts | Promotion or relegation |
|---|---|---|---|---|---|---|---|---|---|---|
| 1 | Kavala (C, P) | 38 | 22 | 15 | 1 | 59 | 13 | +46 | 59 (Note: Kavala and Veria were decided who promote to the Alpha Ethniki in the play-off match.) | Promotion to Alpha Ethniki |
| 2 | Veria | 38 | 24 | 11 | 3 | 69 | 20 | +49 | 59 | |
| 3 | Olympiacos Volos | 38 | 21 | 9 | 8 | 73 | 32 | +41 | 51 | |
| 4 | Doxa Drama | 38 | 19 | 13 | 6 | 63 | 29 | +34 | 51 | |
| 5 | AEL | 38 | 15 | 12 | 11 | 58 | 42 | +16 | 42 | |
| 6 | Lamia | 38 | 14 | 9 | 15 | 34 | 38 | −4 | 37 | |
| 7 | Almopos Aridea | 38 | 15 | 7 | 16 | 39 | 48 | −9 | 37 | |
| 8 | Anagennisi Karditsa | 38 | 11 | 14 | 13 | 34 | 35 | −1 | 36 | |
| 9 | Trikala | 38 | 13 | 9 | 16 | 54 | 56 | −2 | 35 | |
| 10 | Panthrakikos | 38 | 15 | 5 | 18 | 44 | 47 | −3 | 35 | |
| 11 | Levadiakos | 38 | 12 | 11 | 15 | 32 | 45 | −13 | 35 | |
| 12 | Anagennisi Epanomi | 38 | 11 | 13 | 14 | 28 | 43 | −15 | 35 | |
| 13 | Pandramaikos | 38 | 11 | 12 | 15 | 31 | 30 | +1 | 34 | |
| 14 | Naoussa | 38 | 14 | 6 | 18 | 43 | 50 | −7 | 34 | |
| 15 | Kampaniakos | 38 | 12 | 10 | 16 | 37 | 53 | −16 | 34 | |
| 16 | Xanthi | 38 | 12 | 9 | 17 | 33 | 57 | −24 | 33 | |
| 17 | Kozani | 38 | 13 | 6 | 19 | 39 | 53 | −14 | 32 | |
| 18 | Akrites Sykies (R) | 38 | 12 | 6 | 20 | 37 | 59 | −22 | 30 | Relegation to C National Amateur Division |
| 19 | Chalkida (R) | 38 | 12 | 6 | 20 | 40 | 58 | −18 | 28 (Note: ?2 points deducted?) | Relegation to C National Amateur Division |
| 20 | Rigas Feraios (R) | 38 | 6 | 9 | 23 | 28 | 67 | −39 | 21 | Relegation to C National Amateur Division |

(C) Champions; (P) Promoted; (R) Relegated

=== Promotion play-off ===
| Team 1 | Score | Team 2 |
|---|---|---|
| Kavala | 2–1 | Veria |
