= A.O. Pefki F.C. =

AO Pefki
- Full name: Athlitikos Omilos Pefki
- Founded: 1938; 88 years ago
- Ground: Municipal Stadium of Pefki
- Capacity: 1,000
- Chairman: Monemvasiotis Panagiotis
- Manager: Athanasiadis Giorgios
- League: Athens FCA First Division
- 2025–26: Athens FCA Second Division (Group 2), 3rd (promoted)
- Website: http://aopefkis.gr

A.O. Pefki Football Club is a Greek football club, based in Pefki, Attica.

The club was founded in 1938.

== Honours ==
=== Domestic Titles and honours ===
  - Athens FCA First Division Champions: 2
    - 2007–08, 2011–12
  - Athens FCA Cup Winners: 1
    - 1986–87
