= Iraklis Thermaikos F.C. =

Iraklis Thermaikos
- Full name: Iraklis Thermaikos Football Club
- Founded: 2019; 7 years ago
- Ground: Chalastra Municipal Stadium
- Chairman: Eleftherios Imionidis
- Manager: Michalis Salepis
- League: Gamma Ethniki
- 2025–26: Gamma Ethniki (Group 1), 4th
- Website: Official website
Home colours	Away colours

Iraklis Thermaikos (Greek: Ηρακλής Θερμαϊκού), is an association football club based in Ampelokipoi, Thessaloniki, Greece.

== History ==
=== Foundation ===
The club was founded in 2019, inheriting the framework and register of Rouvikonas Ampelokipoi, which had been established in 2005 and competed mainly in the lower divisions of the Macedonia FCA. The name "Iraklis" was chosen in honour of Iraklis Thessaloniki, of which Eleftherios Imionidis—president of Iraklis Thermaikos—is a devoted supporter.

=== League history ===
It immediately became evident that the club operated under professional standards, a fact that was soon reflected on the pitch. In the 2019–20 season, which marked the team's first official league appearance, they were close to securing promotion from the Second to the First Division before the season was suspended due to the COVID-19 pandemic. In the 2020–21 season, the club again competed in the Second Division, but the championship was once more halted after just a few matchdays for the same reason.

From the 2021–22 season, when the FCA competitions resumed normal operation, Iraklis Thermaikos embarked on an unbroken upward trajectory. Initially, the club celebrated promotion to the First Division of the Macedonia FCA in 2022, while during the 2022–23 season, it achieved a second consecutive promotion—this time to the A1 Division (the top tier of the Macedonia FCA) for the first time in its history.

During the 2024–25 season, Iraklis managed to finish in 2nd place in the A1 Division standings, earning a spot in the promotion play-offs for the Gamma Ethniki. In the play-offs, the team again finished in 2nd place in their group behind only Veria, securing promotion to the national divisions for the first time in its history after just five years of existence. The club matched this success in the Macedonia FCA Cup, reaching the final at Toumba Stadium where they were defeated 3–1 by Apollon Kalamarias, a Gamma Ethniki side.

During the 2025–26 season, Iraklis Thermaikos wrote a golden page in its history by finishing fourth in Group 1 of the Gamma Ethniki, securing historic victories throughout the campaign against clubs with long-standing presences in the Super League Greece. Specifically, they defeated Doxa Drama twice (1–0 at home during the regular season and 0–2 away in the play-offs) and recorded a 0–3 away victory against Xanthi during the regular season.

== Crest and Colours ==
Its emblem depicts the capital Greek letter Eta (Η), while its colours are blue and white.

== Stadium ==
Although Iraklis Thermaikos is based in Ampelokipoi, Thessaloniki, the designation "Thermaikos" in the club's name does not refer to the Municipality of Thermaikos, but rather to the Thermaic Gulf, in an effort by the club to encompass the entire Thessaloniki urban area. As a natural consequence, the team does not play in a fixed stadium, but across various grounds throughout the Thessaloniki urban area. During the 2024–25 season, the club played at the stadium of Agios Vasileios, outside the limits of the metropolitan area, before moving to the stadium in Chalastra. In view of the team's first appearance in a national division for the 2025–26 season, it was decided that the club would continue to play its home matches in Chalastra.
