= Kentavros Vrilissia F.C. =

Greek football club

Kentavros Vrilissia
- Full name: Podosfairikos Athlitikos Omilos Kentavros Vrilissia
- Short name: Kentavros
- Founded: 2003; 23 years ago
- Ground: Vrilissia Municipal Stadium
- Capacity: 300
- Chairman: Manolis Manikas
- Manager: Giorgos Ikonomopoulos
- League: Athens FCA First Division
- 2025–26: Gamma Ethniki Group 5, 10th (relegated)
Home colours	Away colours

Kentavros Vrilissia F.C. (Greek: Ποδοσφαιρικός Αθλητικός Όμιλος Βριλησσίων Κένταυρος) is a Greek football club, based in Vrilissia, Athens. The club was founded in the autumn of 2003 and participates in the Athens Football Clubs Association.

== History ==
Kentavros was founded in 2003 and competed in the local divisions of the Athens FCA. In the 2024–25 season, the club won its first-ever league championship. Kentavros defeated Atromitos Metamorfosi 3–0 to finish at the top of its group, outdistancing several historic clubs such as Apollon Smyrnis, Athinaikos, P.A.O. Rouf, and Trachones Alimos. The team subsequently participated in the promotion play-offs, securing a historic promotion to Gamma Ethniki for the first time in its history after defeating Pannaxiakos.

In its debut 2025–26 season in Gamma Ethniki, Kentavros failed to achieve the coveted goal of survival, finishing in 10th place which led to relegation.

== Crest and colours ==
The club's colours are yellow and blue, and its emblem features the mythical centaur from Greek mythology.

== Honours ==
=== Regional ===
- Athens FCA Championship

Winners (1): 2024–25
