= Sarakinos Volos F.C. =

Association football club in Greece

Sarakinos
- Full name: Athlitikos Syllogos Ano Volos Sarakinos
- Founded: 1951; 75 years ago
- Ground: Sarakinos Ground
- Chairman: Theodoros Gklavinis
- Manager: Stelios Arsenos
- League: Gamma Ethniki
- 2025–26: Gamma Ethniki (Group 2), 9th
Home colours	Away colours

Sarakinos Volos (Greek: Σαρακηνός Βόλου) is a Greek football club based in Agia Paraskevi district of Volos, Thessaly. Its official colours are red and black.

== History ==
In 1951, the residents of the then-community of Agia Paraskevi (which at the time lay outside the Volos urban area) founded Sarakinos, formalizing the region's football activity that had existed informally before World War II under the name Aetos Agia Paraskevi. During the 1951–52 season, Sarakinos made its debut in the Thessaly FCA Second Division, winning the title undefeated; however, the club was not promoted as promotion was not provided for in the Thessaly FCA regulations. The roster during that season consisted of: Zigras (goalkeeper), Dialas I, Siouras, Dialas II, Balaskonis, Mallakasiotis, Ntafilias I, Ntafilias II, Kostoglou, Tsochas, Bartzos, Stachtos, Kokkinos, Dragogiannis, and Kongas.

In the 2024–25 season, Sarakinos won the Thessaly FCA First Division championship, securing promotion to Gamma Ethniki via the promotion play-offs and returning to the national third tier after forty-three years. In the 2025–26 season, Sarakinos secured its stay in the division by finishing in 9th place in Group 2.

== Honours ==
=== Regional ===
- Thessaly FCA First Division (3): 1978–79, 1990–91, 2024–25
- Thessaly FCA Cup (1): 1994–95
