= Athens Football Clubs Association =

Association football governing body in Athens Prefecture, Greece

- Full name: Athens Football Clubs Association; Greek: Ένωση Ποδοσφαιρικών Σωματείων Αθηνών
- Short name: Athens F.C.A.; Greek: Ε.Π.Σ. Αθηνών
- Founded: 1924; 102 years ago
- Headquarters: Athens, Greece
- FIFA affiliation: Hellenic Football Federation
- President: Panagiotis Dimitriou
- Website: epsath.gr

Athens Football Clubs Association (Greek: Ένωση Ποδοσφαιρικών Σωματείων Αθηνών-ΕΠΣΑ) is one of the oldest amateur association football governing bodies, representing teams from Athens Prefecture.

== History ==
It was officially founded in 1924, but its history begins in 1919 when the Greece Football Clubs Association was founded. During the 1923–24 Championship of the E.P.S. Greece, the Athenian teams had many complaints from the referee, who they accused of being biased against them in favor of the club of Piraeus. The climax of the protests was the withdrawal from the championship of three teams of Athens on 30 March 1924, two games before its end and while the title seemed to be decided between O.F. Piraeus and A.P.S. Piraeus, who eventually won the title. The teams that left were Panathinaikos, Apollon Athens and Athinaikos

Almost immediately, those three clubs, together with Atromitos, Panionios and the then-founded Milon Athens, created the "Athens Football Clubs Association" (E.S.P. Athens) and proceeded to hold a separate championship with the participation of five clubs. The founding clubs of the association were:

- AEK Athens
- Goudi Athens
- Atromitos
- Panathinaikos
- Panionios
- Apollon Athens

In the early 2000s, the associations of the former the Prefecture of East Attica were split off, creating the East Attica Football Clubs Association, as well as the counterparts of the former Prefecture of West Attica by founding West Attica Football Clubs Association.

== Organization ==
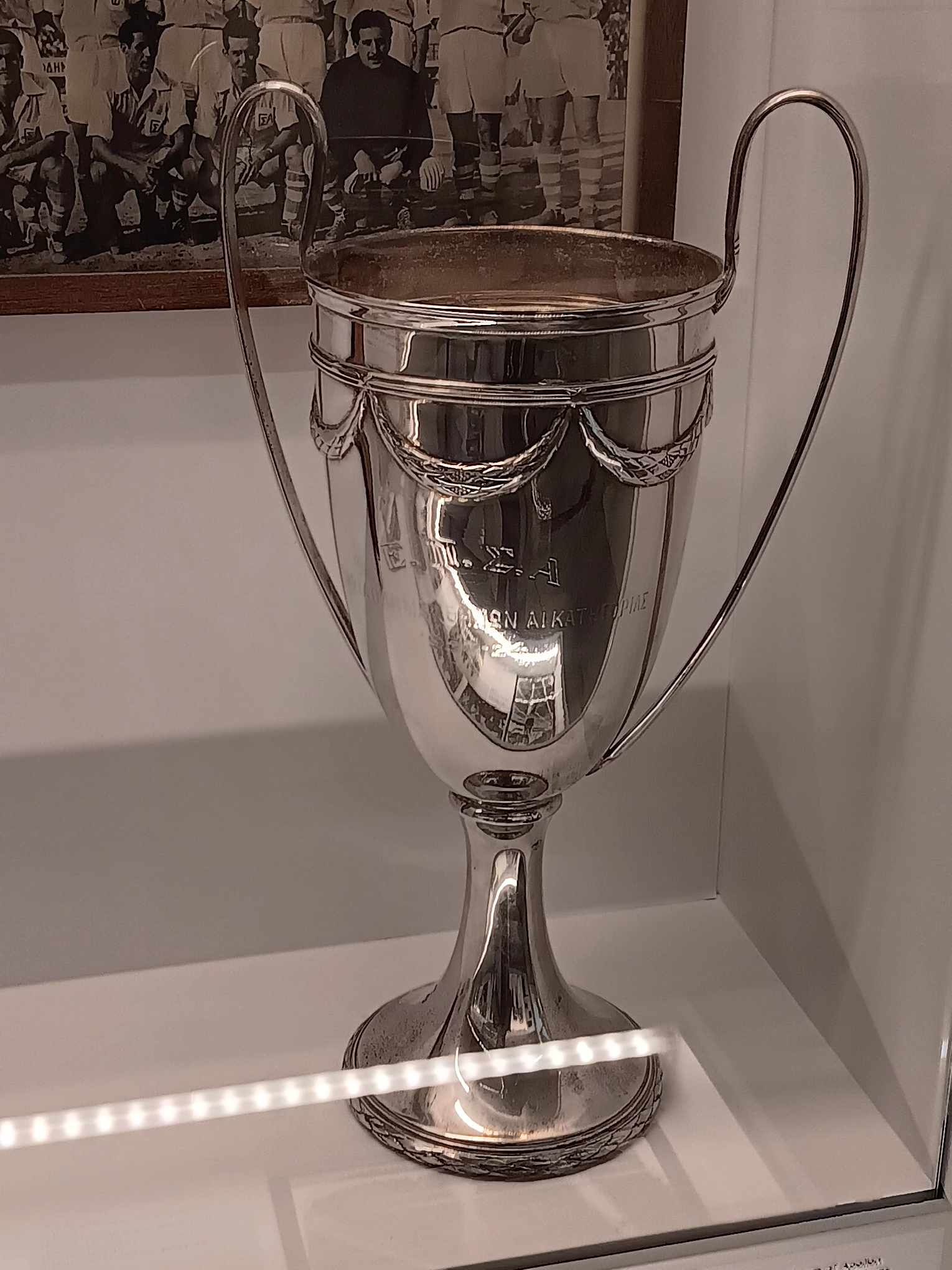
1924 Athens Football Clubs Association Cup

From 1924 to 1959 the first division E.P.S. Athens included in its composition the top teams of Athens. Until the 1958–59 season, the first two, three or four teams of the final standings of Athens first division were qualified to the final phase of the Panhellenic Championship, together with the corresponding teams from the E.P.S. of Piraeus and Macedonia and some provincial clubs that qualified through a special tournament called "Regional Championships". Thus, the first division of Athens was the most difficult of any other local association, as the clubs that made it up were clearly stronger than their counterparts. It was common for the Athenian teams that reached the final phase of the Panhellenic Championship to be exhausted due to great competition and the lack of current training infrastructure. Until 1959 the first division of Athens was essentially the most powerful local league in the country, but with the establishment of the national divisions, it lost ground in the football hierarchy.

== League ==
The association is a member of the Hellenic Football Federation and organizes a regional football league and cup. It currently represents 900 football players and 131 amateur men's football clubs.

Twenty (20) of these football clubs are playing in national leagues. The six (6) women's football clubs of Athens F.C.A. are playing in the first and second national league. Sixteen (16) football clubs are playing in Hellenic Indoor Football League.

The football clubs are separated in three leagues:

- Athens F.C.A. A league (33 clubs)
  - Group A (17 clubs)
  - Group B (16 clubs)
- Athens F.C.A. B league (47 clubs)
  - Group A (16 clubs)
  - Group B (15 clubs)
  - Group C (16 clubs)
- Athens F.C.A. C league (48 clubs)
  - Group A (12 clubs)
  - Group B (12 clubs)
  - Group C (12 clubs)
  - Group D (12 clubs)

=== Champions ===
Season	Winner
Before the establishment of national divisions
1923–24	Apollon Athens
1924–25	Panathinaikos
1925–26	Panathinaikos
1926–27	Panathinaikos
1927–28	Atromitos
1928–29	Panathinaikos
1929–30	Panathinaikos
1930–31	Panathinaikos
1931–32	Goudi
1932–33	Goudi
1933–34	Panathinaikos
1934–35	Abandoned
1935–36	Asteras Gyzi
1936–37	Panathinaikos
1937–38	Apollon Athens
1938–39	Panathinaikos
1939–40	AEK Athens
1940–41	Not held
1941–42	Not held
1942–43	AEK Athens
1943–44	Not held
1944–45	Not held
1945–46	AEK Athens
1946–47	AEK Athens
1947–48	Apollon Athens
1948–49	Panathinaikos
1949–50	AEK Athens
1950–51	Panionios
1951–52	Panathinaikos
1952–53	Panathinaikos
1953–54	Panathinaikos
1954–55	Panathinaikos
1955–56	Panathinaikos
1956–57	Panathinaikos
1957–58	Apollon Athens
1958–59	Panathinaikos
After the establishment of national divisions
1959–60	Egaleo
1960–61	Egaleo
1961–62	Atromitos
1962–63	Ilisiakos
1963–64	PAO Kalogreza
1964–65	A.O. Chalandri
1965–66	Attikos
1966–67	Petralona
1967–68	Poseidon Glyfada
1968–69	Kallithea
1969–70	Acharnaikos
1970–71	Ilisiakos
1971–72	Ilisiakos
1972–73	Asteras Zografou
1973–74	PAO Thriamvos Athens
1974–75	Agios Dimitrios
1975–76	Kallithea
1976–77	Agios Dimitrios
1977–78	PAO Rouf
1978–79	Diagoras Egaleo
1979–80	Athinais
1980–81	Agios Ierotheos
1981–82	Ilioupoli
1982–83	Charavgiakos
1983–84	Marko
1984–85	A.O. Vouliagmeni
1985–86	Cholargos
1986–87	Akratitos
1987–88	Ilioupoli
1988–89	Keravnos Keratea
1989–90	Agia Eleousa
1990–91	G.S. Patisia
1991–92	Agia Paraskevi
1992–93	Attikos
1993–94	Agios Ierotheos
1994–95	Olympiakos Nea Liosia
1995–96	Ilioupoli
1996–97	Akratitos
1997–98	Asteras Zografou
1998–99	Ilisiakos
1999–2000	Agia Eleousa
2000–01	Ilisiakos
2001–02	Terpsithea Glyfada
2002–03	Athinais
2003–04	Agia Paraskevi
2004–05	Sourmena
2005–06	Agoi Anargyroi
2006–07	Paradisos Amarousiou (1st group); Olympiakos Nea Liosia (2nd group)
2007–08	A.O. Pefki (1st group); Vrilissia (2nd group)
2008–09	Elpidoforos Kifisia (1st group); Pera Club (2nd group)
2009–10	Ifestos Peristeri
2010–11	A.O. Trachones Alimos
2011–12	Iasonas Nea Liosia (1st group); A.O. Pefki (2nd group)
2012–13	Charavgiakos (1st group); Doxa Vyronas (2nd group)
2013–14	Haidari (1st group); Panerythraikos (2nd group)
2014–15	A.E. Irakleio (1st group); Egaleo (2nd group)
2015–16	Egaleo (1st group); Agios Ierotheos (2nd group)
2016–17	Charavgiakos (1st group); Egaleo (2nd group)
2017–18	Agoi Anargyroi (1st group); Charavgiakos (2nd group)
2018–19	A.E. Kifisia (1st group); Fostiras (2nd group)
2019–20	Charavgiakos (1st group); PAO Rouf (2nd group)
2020–21	Suspended due to COVID-19 pandemic
2021–22	Aris Petroupolis
2022–23	Ilisiakos
2023–24	Asteras Kaisariani (1st group); A.O. Nea Ionia (2nd group)
2024–25	Kentavros Vrilissia (1st group); Doxa Vyronas (2nd group)
2025–26	PAO Rouf (1st group); Apollon Smyrnis (2nd group)

=== Winners by club ===
Before the establishment of national divisions
Club	Winner	Seasons
Panathinaikos	17	1925, 1926, 1927, 1929, 1930, 1931, 1934, 1937, 1939, 1949, 1952, 1953, 1954, 1955, 1956, 1957, 1959
AEK Athens	5	1940, 1943, 1946, 1947, 1950
Apollon Athens	4	1924, 1938, 1948, 1958
Goudi	2	1932, 1933
Atromitos	1	1928
Asteras Gyzi	1	1936
Panionios	1	1951

After the establishment of national divisions
Club	Winner	Seasons
Ilisiakos	6	1963, 1971, 1972, 1999, 2001, 2023
Egaleo	5	1960, 1961, 2015, 2016, 2017
Charavgiakos	5	1983, 2013, 2017, 2018, 2020
Agios Ierotheos	3	1981, 1994, 2016
Ilioupoli	3	1982, 1988, 1996
Haidari	3	1986, 2014, 2023
PAO Rouf	3	1978, 2020, 2026
Kallithea	2	1969, 1976
Agios Dimitrios	2	1975, 1977
Attikos	2	1966, 1993
Akratitos	2	1987, 1997
Asteras Zografou	2	1973, 1998
Agia Eleousa	2	1990, 2000
Athinais	2	1980, 2003
Agia Paraskevi	2	1992, 2004
Doxa Vyronas	2	2013, 2025
Olympiakos Nea Liosia	2	1995, 2007
A.O Pefki	2	2008, 2012
Agoi Anargyroi	2	2006, 2018
Atromitos	1	1962
PAO Kalogreza	1	1964
A.O. Chalandri	1	1965
Petralona	1	1967
Poseidon Glyfada	1	1968
Acharnaikos	1	1970
PAO Thriamvos Athens	1	1974
Diagoras Egaleo	1	1979
Marko	1	1984
A.O. Vouliagmeni	1	1985
Cholargos	1	1986
Keravnos Keratea	1	1989
G.S. Patisia	1	1991
Terpsithea Glyfada	1	2002
Sourmena	1	2005
Paradisos Amarousiou	1	2007
Vrilissia	1	2008
Pera Club	1	2009
Elpidoforos Kifisia	1	2009
Ifestos Peristeri	1	2010
A.O. Trachones Alimos	1	2011
Iasonas Neon Liosion	1	2012
Panerythraikos	1	2014
A.E. Irakleio	1	2015
A.E. Kifisia	1	2019
Fostiras	1	2019
Aris Petroupolis	1	2022
Asteras Kaisariani	1	2024
A.O. Nea Ionia	1	2024
Kentavros Vrilissia	1	2025
Apollon Smyrnis	1	2026

== Cup ==
=== Finals ===
Season	Winner	Result	Runner-up	Ground	Source
1971–72	A.O.N. Argyroupoli	2–2 (3–2 p)	Charavgiakos	Nea Smyrni Stadium	
1972–73	PAO Thriamvos Athens	1–1 (3–2 p)	A.O.N. Argyroupoli	Nea Smyrni Stadium	
1973–74	A.O. Koukouvaounes	2–0	A.O. Paradisos Amarousion	Cholargos Municipal Stadium	
1974–75	Ilioupoli	1–1 (3–2 p)	Agoi Anargyroi	Tavros Stadium	
1975–76	PAO Rouf	3–2	Kallithea	Peristeri Stadium	
1976–77	Agios Dimitrios	3–2	A.O. Oropos	Grigoris Lamprakis Stadium	
1977–78	Ilioupoli	0–0 (4–3 p)	Iraklis Peristeri	Nikos Goumas Stadium	
1978–79	A.O. Pangrati	0–0 (3–2 p)	Keravnos Keratea	Leoforos Alexandras Stadium	
1979–80	Athinaikos	2–0	Koropi	Leoforos Alexandras Stadium	
1980–81	Athinaikos	2–1	Cholargos	Peristeri Stadium	
1981–82	A.O. Peristeri	1–0	Keravnos Keratea	Georgios Kamaras Stadium	
1982–83	A.O. Chalandri	0–0 (3–0 p)	Agios Dimitrios	Leoforos Alexandras Stadium	
1983–84	A.E. Galatsi	3–1	Marko	Leoforos Alexandras Stadium	
1984–85	Ifestos Peristeri	3–1	Ilioupoli	Grigoris Lamprakis Stadium	
1985–86	Keravnos Keratea	3–1	Asteras Zografou	Grigoris Lamprakis Stadium	
1986–87	A.O. Pefki	0–0 (4–3 p)	Triglia Rafinas	Leoforos Alexandras Stadium	
1987–88	A.O. Vouliagmeni	4–2	A.O. Pefki	Leoforos Alexandras Stadium	
1988–89	Doxa Vyronas	2–1	A.O. Kifisia	Leoforos Alexandras Stadium	
1989–90	Cholargos	1–0	Machi Marathonas	Leoforos Alexandras Stadium	
1990–91	A.O. Kifisia	1–1 (4–3 p)	A.O. Pefki	Leoforos Alexandras Stadium	
1991–92	Agia Paraskevi	2–0	A.O. Chalandri	Athens Olympic Stadium	
1992–93	Panathinaikos (Amateur team)	2–0	Agios Ierotheos	Athens Olympic Stadium	
1993–94	Panathinaikos (Amateur team)	2–1	AEK Nea Liosia	Athens Olympic Stadium	
1994–95	Marko	2–1	Agios Ierotheos		
1995–96	Agia Eleousa	4–1	PAO Kamatero	Georgios Kamaras Stadium	
1996–97	Sourmena	2–1	Aris Petroupolis		
1997–98	Akratitos	3–0	Acharnaikos	Nikos Goumas Stadium	
1998–99	Asteras Zografou	1–1 (5–4 p)	Akratitos	Georgios Kamaras Stadium	
1999–2000	Agios Dimitrios	1–0	Thrasyvoulos		
2000–01	Thrasyvoulos	3–0	A.O. Chalandri		
2001–02	PAO Rouf	1–0	Thrasyvoulos		
2002–03	Ilisiakos	1–0	Haidari	Grigoris Lamprakis Stadium	
2003–04	Haidari	3–2 (a.e.t.)	Sourmena	Michalis Kritikopoulos Stadium	
2004–05	Agia Paraskevi	2–1	Ajax Tavros	Leoforos Alexandras Stadium	
2005–06	Fostiras	2–0	PAO Rouf	Peristeri Stadium	
2006–07	Fostiras	4–0	A.O. Nea Ionia	Stavros Mavrothalassitis Stadium	
2007–08	Agia Paraskevi	3–2	PAO Rouf	Leoforos Alexandras Stadium	
2008–09	PAO Rouf	2–1	Olympiakos Neon Liosion	Peristeri Stadium	
2009–10	Apollon Smyrnis	2-1	Elpidoforos Kifisia	Georgios Kamaras Stadium	
2010–11	Keravnos Glyfada	2–0	Iasonas Ilion	Peristeri Stadium	
2011–12	Fostiras	3–1	Athinaikos	Peristeri Stadium	
2012–13	A.E. Kifisia	1–1 (4–3 p)	Egaleo	Nea Smyrni Stadium	
2013–14	Panerythraikos	1–0	A.E. Irakleio	Georgios Kamaras Stadium	
2014–15	Egaleo	1–0	Charavgiakos	Nea Smyrni Stadium	
2015–16	A.O. Chalandri	3–0	Ilisiakos	Georgios Kamaras Stadium	
2016–17	Sourmena	2–1	Charavgiakos	Nea Smyrni Stadium	
2017–18	A.E. Kifisia	2–0	Agia Paraskevi	Peristeri Stadium	
2018–19	Ilisiakos	1–0	Agios Ierotheos	Georgios Kamaras Stadium	
2019–20	Agios Ierotheos	3–0 (w/o)^{1}	Fostiras	―	
2020–21	Suspended^{2}				
2021–22	Ilioupoli	3–1	Diana Ilioupoli	Georgios Kamaras Stadium	
2022–23	Ethnikos Asteras	1–0 (a.e.t.)	Aris Petroupolis	Georgios Kamaras Stadium	
2023–24	A.O. Nea Ionia	2–0	Aris Petroupolis	Georgios Kamaras Stadium	
2024–25	Haidari	3–2 (a.e.t.)	Apollon Smyrnis	Peristeri Stadium	
2025–26	Haidari	1–0	PAO Rouf	Leoforos Alexandras Stadium	

Notes

^{1} The cup was suspended due to the COVID-19 pandemic and thus the outcome of the institution was judged after a draw.

^{2} All the institutions of the local association were suspended due to the COVID-19 pandemic.

=== Winners by club ===
Club	Winner	Season
Agia Paraskevi	3	1992, 2005, 2008
PAO Rouf	3	1976, 2002, 2009
Fostiras	3	2006, 2007, 2012
Ilioupoli	3	1975, 1978, 2022
Haidari	3	2004, 2025, 2026
Athinaikos	2	1980, 1981
Panathinaikos (Amateur team)	2	1993, 1994
Agios Dimitrios	2	1977, 2000
A.O. Chalandri	2	1983, 2016
Sourmena	2	1997, 2017
A.E. Kifisia	2	2013, 2018
Ilisiakos	2	2003, 2019
A.O.N. Argyroupoli	1	1972
PAO Thriamvos Athens	1	1973
A.O. Koukouvaounes	1	1974
A.O. Pangrati	1	1979
A.O. Peristeri	1	1982
A.E. Galatsi	1	1984
Ifestos Peristeri	1	1985
Keravnos Keratea	1	1986
A.O Pefki	1	1987
A.O. Vouliagmeni	1	1988
Doxa Vyronas	1	1989
Cholargos	1	1990
A.O. Kifisia	1	1991
Marko	1	1995
Agia Eleousa	1	1996
Akratitos	1	1998
Asteras Zografou	1	1999
Thrasyvoulos	1	2001
Apollon Smyrnis	1	2010
Keravnos Glyfada	1	2011
Panerythraikos	1	2014
Egaleo	1	2015
Agios Ierotheos	1	2020
Ethnikos Asteras	1	2023
A.O. Nea Ionia	1	2024

== Sources ==
- Greece – List of Regional Champions
