= Petroupoli =

Petroupoli Πετρούπολη
- Municipality
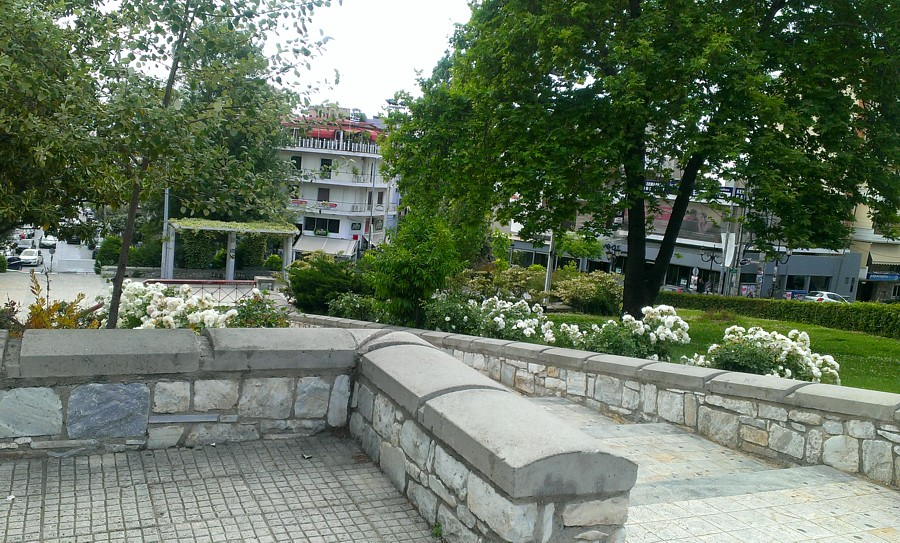

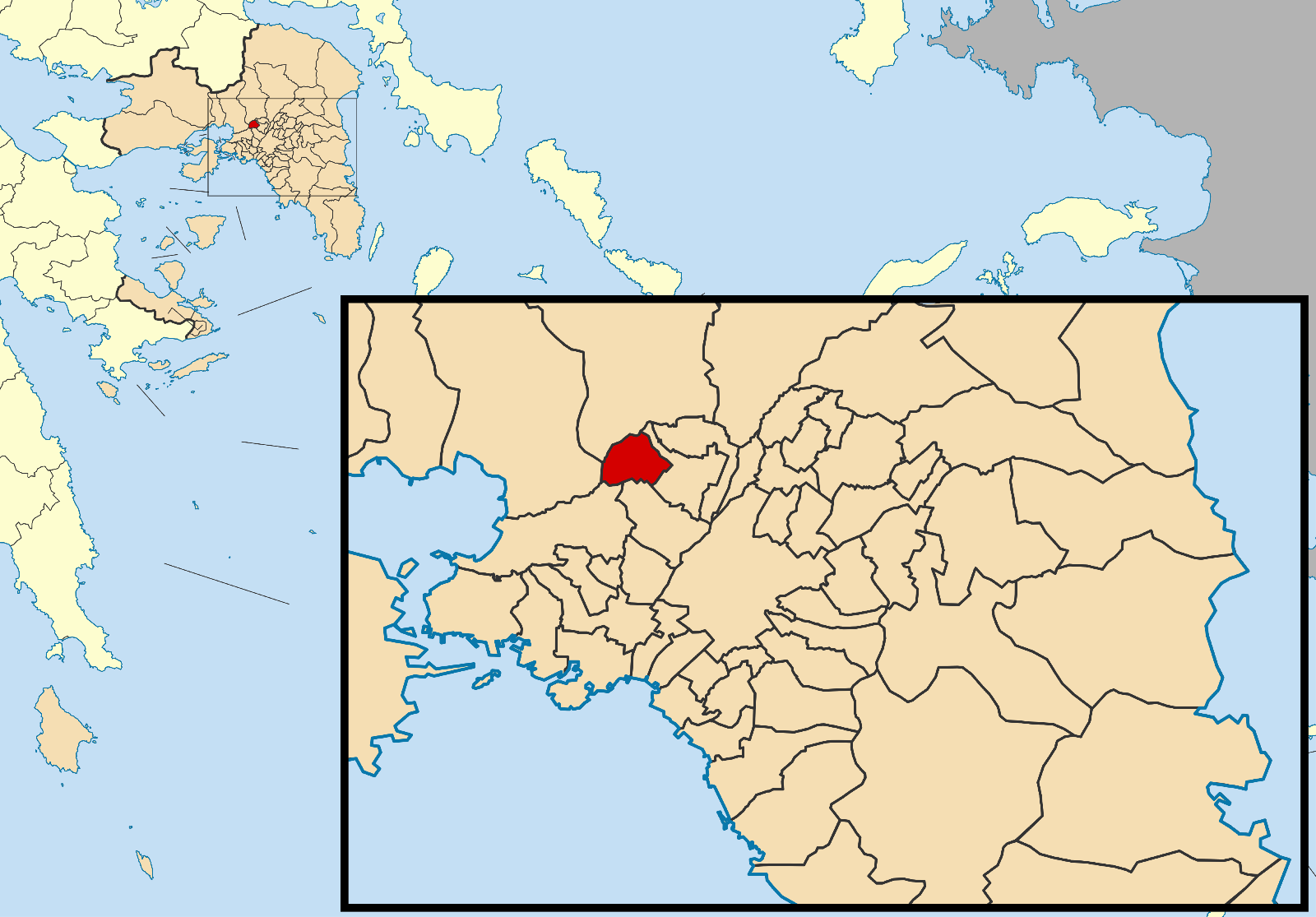

- Location within Greece
- Coordinates: 38°2′N 23°41′E
- Country: Greece
- Administrative region: Attica
- Regional unit: West Athens

Government
  - Mayor: Evangelos Simos (since 2023)

Area
  - Municipality: 6.597 km^{2} (2.547 sq mi)
- Highest elevation: 262 m (860 ft)
- Lowest elevation: 108 m (354 ft)

Population (2021)
  - Municipality: 60,146
  - Density: 9,117/km^{2} (23,610/sq mi)
- Time zone: UTC+2 (EET)
  - Summer (DST): UTC+3 (EEST)
- Postal code: 13231
- Area code: 210 50
- Vehicle registration: ΙΖΧ
- Website: www.petroupoli.gov.gr

Petroupoli (Greek: Πετρούπολη, meaning "city of Petros/Peter") is a semi-mountainous town in Attica, Greece, in the west suburbs of Athens. Petroupoli was part of the community of Nea Liosia until 1946, when it became a separate community. It was elevated to municipality status in 1972.

== Geography ==
Petroupoli is situated in the eastern foothills of the Zacharitsa (Poikilo Oros) mountain, 7 km northwest of Athens. The municipality has an area of 6.597 km^{2}. Its main streets (25 March Ave., Anatolikis Romylias St., and Perikleous St.) connect the town with Ilion and Peristeri.

ASDA (Association for the Development of Western Athens) regards Petroupoli as the most developed town in the administrative sector of West Athens .

== Culture and education ==
The Petra Festival takes place every summer. The area's junior football (soccer) team is named Akadimia Petroupolis.

The traditional festival of the church in the upper town dedicated to the prophet Elias is usually organized around July in the playground of Profitis Elias, where folk music and dances are performed along with other activities such as grilled meat selling.

Petroupoli incorporates a number of private and 15 public kindergartens, 12 primary schools (11 public and 1 private), 6 public lower secondary schools (gymnasia), 5 public upper secondary schools (lyceums), and one public Technical Secondary School (EPAL).

== Historical population ==
Year	Population
1981	27,902
1991	38,278
2001	48,327
2011	58,979
2021	60,146
