= Vrilissia =

Vrilissia Βριλήσσια
- Municipality
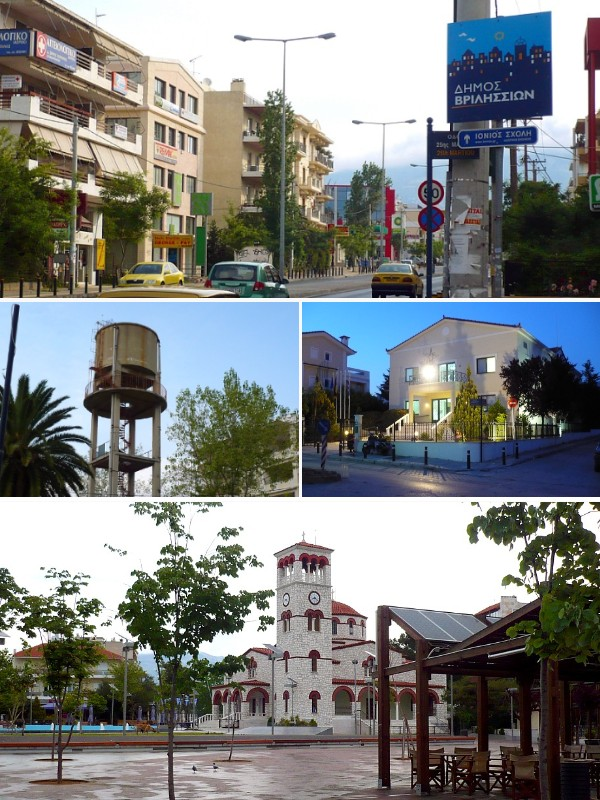
- From upper left: Pendelis Avenue, The Water Tower, the Cultural Hall and Analipseos Square

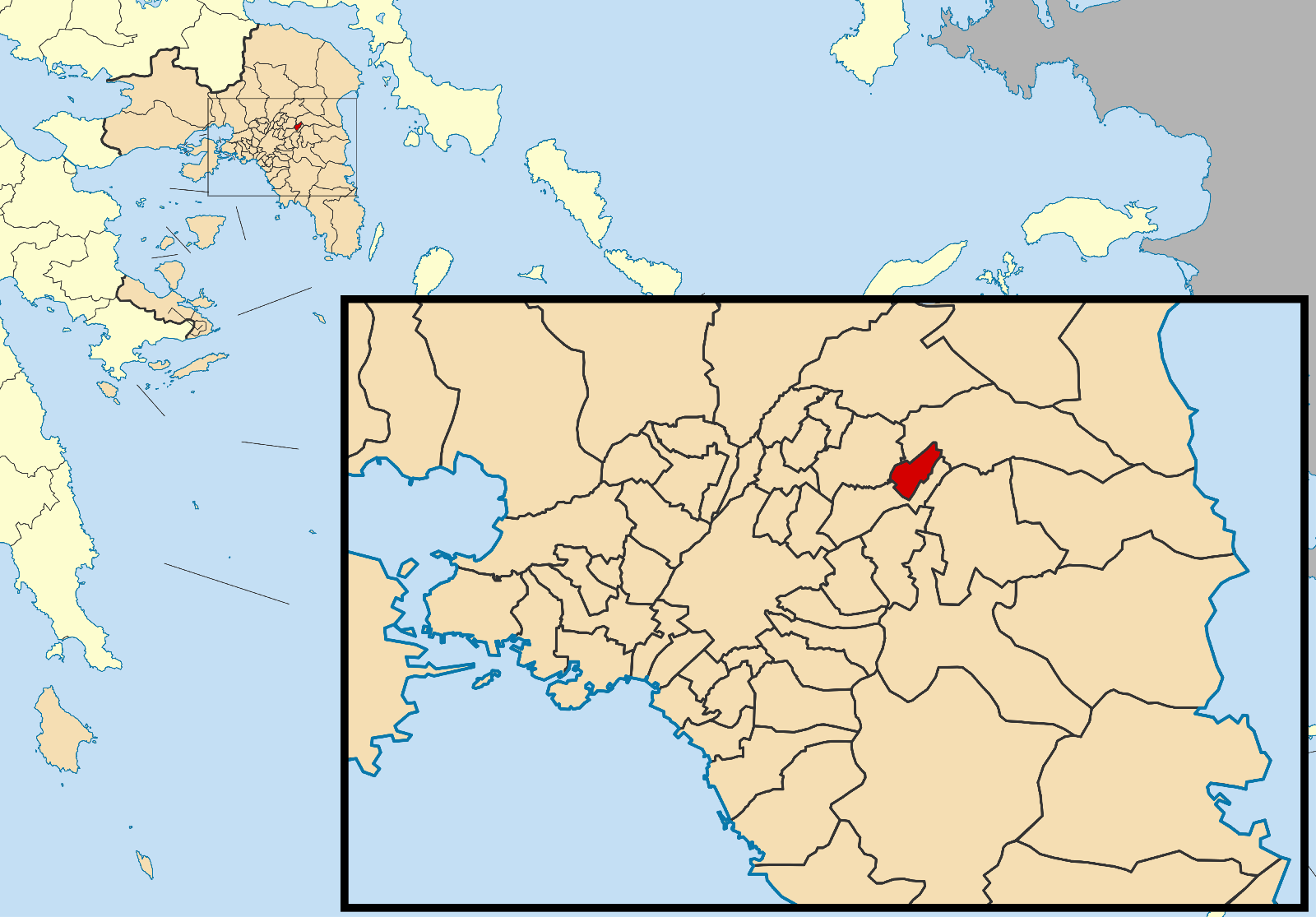

- Location within Greece
- Coordinates: 38°2′N 23°50′E
- Country: Greece
- Administrative region: Attica
- Regional unit: North Athens

Government
  - Mayor: Ioannis Pisimisis (since 2023)

Area
  - Municipality: 3.856 km^{2} (1.489 sq mi)
- Elevation: 245 m (804 ft)

Population (2021)
  - Municipality: 32,417
  - Density: 8,407/km^{2} (21,770/sq mi)
- Time zone: UTC+2 (EET)
  - Summer (DST): UTC+3 (EEST)
- Postal code: 152 35
- Area code: 210
- Vehicle registration: I
- Website: www.vrilissia.gr

Vrilissia (Greek: Βριλήσσια) is a suburban town and a municipality of the North Athens regional unit, in the Attica region of Greece. It is located in the Athens basin, at the southwestern foot of the Penteli Mountain. According to the 2021 census, the municipality has 32,417 residents.

== Geography ==
The administrative limits of the municipality extend from the Chalandri gully up to foothills of the Penteli, known as Patima and Koufos Hills. Vrilissia lies approximately 10 kilometres (6 miles) north-east of the centre of the Greek capital and 5 kilometres (3 miles) northwest of the city of Pallini, centre of East Attica. The area of the Vrilissia municipality is 3.856 square kilometres (1.489 square miles).

Among the municipality's features one notices the low rise profile with four apartment floors maximum at the center, while particularly high is also the rate of private gardens. The centre of the municipality is built up around the Analipseos Main Church (Jesus Christ's Ascension Church), while the commercial area mainly extends throughout the Penteli Avenue. The municipality is generally composed of residents among the median and upper income bands.

The municipality is connected with all urban and suburban means of transport of Attica. The Athens northern beltway A6 motorway (Greece) and the short A621 motorway pass through the municipality. It is served by two commuter railway stations (Doukissis Plakentias station and Pentelis station) and a metro station (Doukissis Plakentias). Several (and relatively frequent) buses serve destinations to neighbouring suburbs as well as the centre of Athens. The main thoroughfare is Pentelis Avenue, which connects Vrilissia with Chalandri and central Athens.

== History ==
In antiquity the area of Vrilissia formed part of the deme of Phlya, which covered the land spanning from Psychiko to Agia Paraskevi and mainly centered on what is now known as the Municipality of Chalandri.

Vrilissia was part of the municipality of Chalandri until 1949, when it became a separate community. It became a municipality in 1990. The suburb experienced rapid development during 2004 as a result of city improvements for the Athens Olympic Games, with the city's peripheral road circuit completed, works of the city's regeneration, widening of the central avenue and diverting of the inner traffic. After long-lasting conflicts, the Naval Base region was transferred to the municipality with an official ceremony, while many small parks were created in each neighbourhood.

Tax Values of the land in 2007 fluctuate from €1,550 – 2,050 / m^{2}, in similar levels with the neighbouring Chalandri and Agia Paraskevi. Actual selling prices broke through the barrier of the €2,000 / m^{2} reaching between €2,200 and 3,000 / m^{2}.

Mayor of municipality since 2007 is Mr Kostas Ioannidis, while Mr Nikos Papadopoulos is granted with the title of Emeritus President of the Municipality as chairman of the Vrilissia Community for many years, assisting on local issues. From January 2024 mayor is Mr Ioannis Pisimisis.

== Etymology ==
One may come across many references of the "Vrilissos" (or alternatively "Vrilittos") name in some of Thucydides, Herodotus and Strabo's writings. The name probably means "Great Rock" and derives from the words "vri" (βρι), meaning "forceful", from the verb "vriao" (βριάω), meaning "I'm full of power", "li" (λη), from the word "laas" (λάας) meaning "rock", and the Pelasgic ending "sos" (σος). The Penteli Mountain was named that way because of the great white stones and beautiful marbles mined out and used for the magnificent world-renowned monuments of Acropolis in antiquity (as well as for the modern buildings of the 19th century in Athens), before the Great Penteli Abbey being set at the foot of the mountain in 1576 by the bishop of Evripos, Timotheos Mentelis.

The word "Vrilissia" is a plural form of a neuter noun (τα Βριλήσσια) referring to the land of the Great Rock Mountain (Penteli). The word is pronounced as "Vri-lί-ssi-a". The Greek form for Municipality of Vrilissia is "Δήμος Βριλησσίων".

The city's logo depicts a well known ancient Greek trove, whereas a boulder representing the municipality's megalith-shaped form is placed at the main park of the city (Eleftherias Square, meaning Square of Freedom).

== Features ==
Vrilissia is an affluent suburb with several schools spanning all grades, sporting grounds and parks; it is also home to a large commercial district with a number of banks and several malls within its territory. Two popular centres of activity are the two main squares, "Plateia Iroon" or Iroon Square and "Plateia Analipseos" or Analipseos Square, recently renovated and hosting several small coffee shops. Vrilissia has exceptionally wide, straight roads, in stark contrast to those typically found in Athens, and is also relatively green, with most houses/apartment blocks extending to gardens.

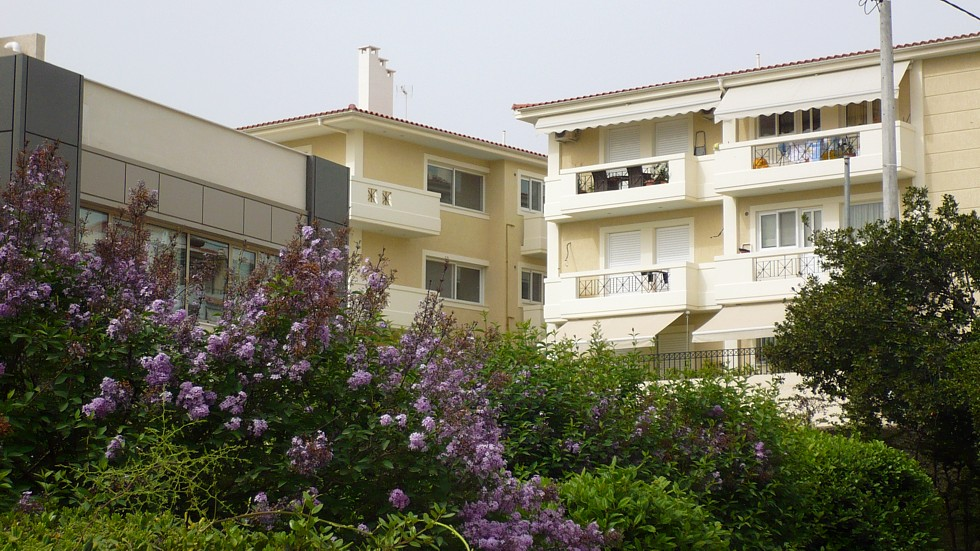
Ano Vrilissia Maisonette Block

Vrilissia has a popular men's handball team, competing in the A1 league.

== Vrilissia suburban forest ==
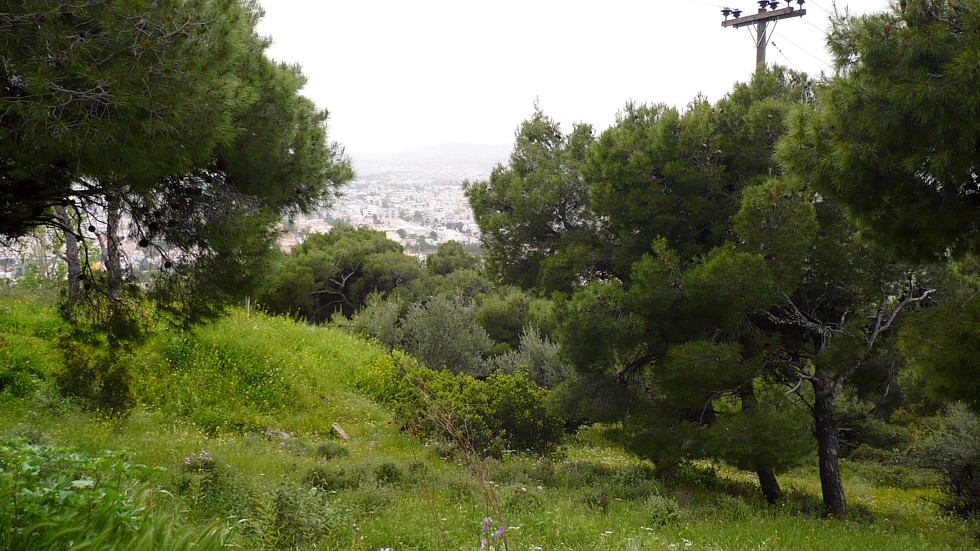
Vrilissia Suburban Forest

The administrative limits of the city at around 1950–1970 reached up to the foothills of the Pentelikon Mountain. In particular, the residential part at the urban design of the suburb in the old days reached to the peripheral road of Penteli, Anapafseos's Avenue. Over that avenue the woodland of Patima Hill (Footing Hill) spread, on which the Metamorphoseos tou Sotiros (Jesus Christ Savior's Metamorphosis) church was set, as well as a small space with pits placed for the neighbouring marble workshops. This space was progressively shaped for the settlement of the Vrilissia Municipal Damari (Pit) Theatre of Aliki Vougiouklaki.

At that time, Penteli constituted a popular destination for day excursions for Athenians, as well as picnics, walks in the forest, a stop for a coffee, or dinner at the local taverns. Despite the natural wealth of the mountain, it was never characterised as a "National Forest", as was the case with the neighbouring Parnitha Mountain, largely due to the landholding muniments of the Penteli Abbey since the 16th century, often sold or adopted by local mountaineer graziers working at the abbey's farm-lands, before the constitution of the modern Greek state.. When urban housing projects began reaching Halandri, Vrilissia and Melissia, Penteli started to transform into a residential landscape. Features that had long started to creep in, since the time of the monks, the Sarakatsaneoi graziers and the Doukissa of Plakentia who lived there since the 18th century. The gradual rise in value of the region, caused by the build-up of the area, triggered individual or association claims, while the available pieces of land at the main Vrilissia area were rapidly taken up.

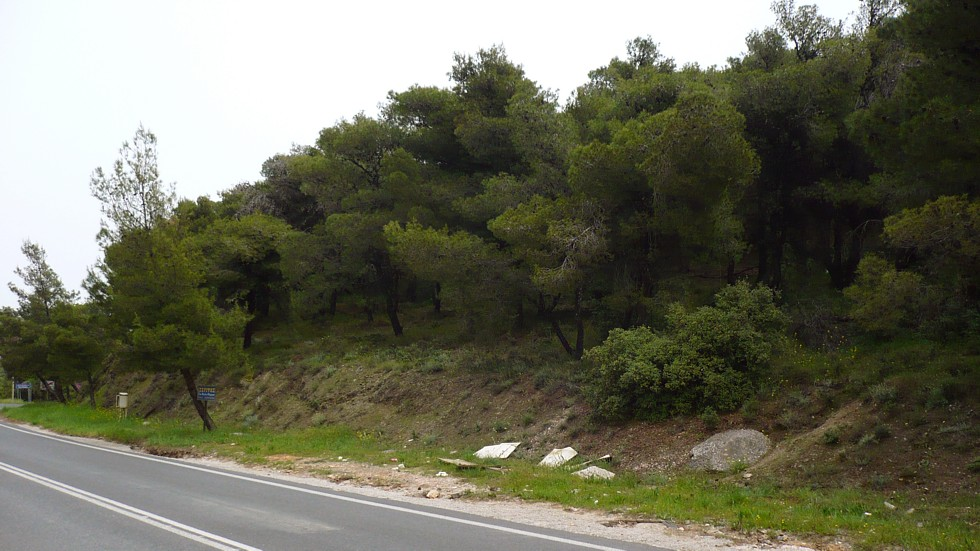
Pentelis Avenue

When the Penteli town plan began to take form, the claims increased, both in volume and intensity. Courts began to vindicate individual and association claims with a legal base of "good fidelity", and "usucaption". Vrilissia kept expanding into the hill, while it saw losses from each of its sides from the neighbouring suburbs of Melissia, New and Old Penteli. Around this time and in stark contrast to the lower-density provisions afforded for the Ano Vrilissia settlement below the Anapafseos Avenue, the hill was allowed multi-floor apartment blocks (up to five levels), in the process compromising the aesthetics of the Penteliko scenery.

The hill was residented during a period when the cadastre and the distinction of the urban and forestry areas were at a primal stage (and still are in 2007 for Greece). The south area of the hill looking at the Athens basin was included in the urban design of Vrilissia and the street layout approved was implemented. However, at the east of the Patima of Vrilissia residential settlement, beyond the steep Kalavriton (Kalavrita) Street, still lies a forestry area that has not been recognized nor by the plan of Vrilissia, neither by Penteli. This area is known as "Krassas Settlement", which has been a point of scepticism for the various municipal authorities that governed the suburb. The need for applying the law often stumbled at social dilemmas, with resulted to the few residents of the settlement being cut away from any form of transportation or other urban convenience applied, but with the municipality also being unable to utilise part of its forestry heritage. This area amounts roughly to 0.045 km^{2} (0.017 sq mi), of which the 0.010 are inhabited. The latest proposals of the municipal council suggested concession of 500 m^{2} (5,400 sq ft) per household to those who abide by the criteria of the law (that allocate titles of purchase of the land inhabited). The municipality, according to the same proposal, claims the remaining indisposed land at the region of 0.030 km^{2} (0.012 sq mi) plus those that in collaboration with the forestry service of Penteli will be declared as forestry. As a result of the above, a few months before the summer of 2007 it had been forecast that 0.040 km^{2} (0.015 sq mi) of forestry land would be acquired and utilised by the municipality. Still, some local papers forecast negative events, as this would stimulate the appetite of many.

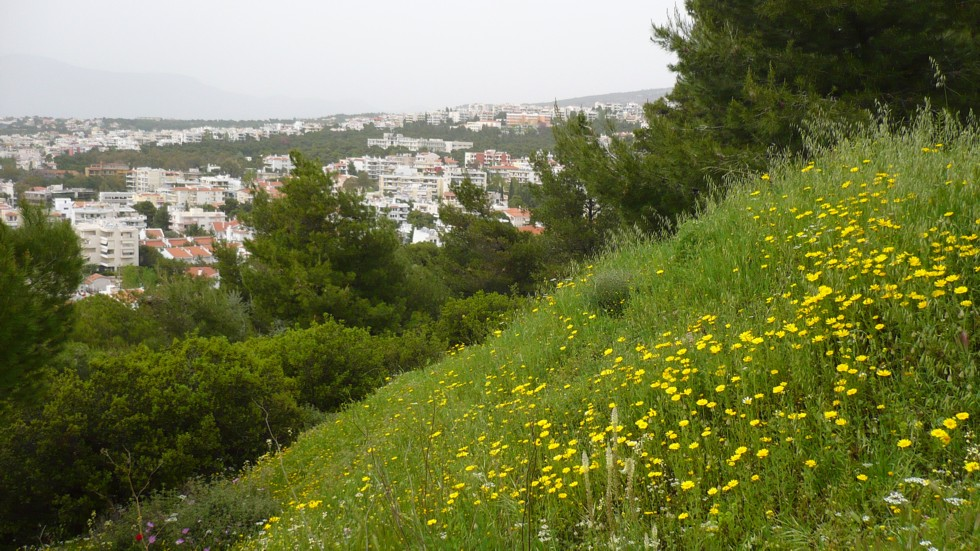
Patima Hill

Finally, a pine-clad area of 0.088 km^{2} (0.034 sq mi) was preserved around the northern borders of the municipality, up to the neighbouring suburbs and reaching the Halandri gullies to the south, a natural protection of the city from the traffic and exhaust. The climate of Vrilissia has always been exceptional in a "cement city" as some parts of Athens are often characterized. Even today, with the important new transportation projects built, and the trading development, Vrilissia's climate is still considered to be clean, offering ideal conditions of living to its residents. Nevertheless, during the last years many unfortunate incidents have threatened this particular feature of the region.

In the means of the 2000s (decade), members of the Building Association "Agios Theoklitos" (Saint Theoklitos) are introduced as owners of large pieces of the Patima forested land to the west of the Vrilissia built area (near the Penteli Avenue), claiming that their association bought this piece of land in 1965 from the Penteli Abbey. However, the Court of First Instance of Athens (Πολυμελές Πρωτοδικείο Αθηνών) by the 3537/2001 decision indicated that the Greek state was the owner of the sub judice piece of land, for the Penteli Abbey had never been the owner of the 88.542 m^{2} (953.06 sq ft) sold to the Association. For another individual claim of 9.713 m ^{2} at the same geographic region, the Court on the 7319/2005 decision indicated that at the same the individual had bought the sub judice piece of land at an auction sale (December 20, 1971) by the Penteli Abbey for 2,980,000 drachmas (δραχμές). The thought prevailed in the court was that the wide region of "Gerotsakouli" (Γεροτσακούλι) had been owned by the abbey since its foundation in 1578 by Saint Timotheos Mentelis, Bishop of Evripos partially by donations from devout Christians and by purchase in 1600 by the Ottoman from Karystos of Evia named Kagadis with muniments that were destroyed during the Greek liberation by the army of Omer Vryonis.

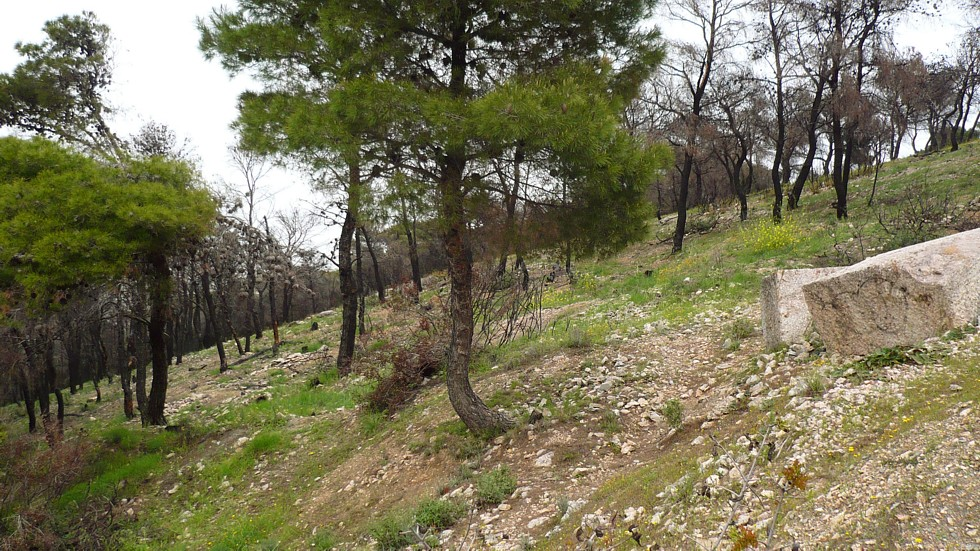
Burnt area near the land claimed by the Agios Theoklitos association, a few weeks after the adjudication

The recorded suggestions of the Greek state that the sub judice piece of land was characterized as forested since 1836 and that it constituted part of a wider region that came under its ownership by the Treaty of Konstantinoupoli on account of the "final distinction of the Greek borders" and by the 1830 protocols of London, as successor of the Turkish State, were not accepted by the court. On the contrary, the court decided that the Abbey from 1600 until 1955 owned in good faith those parts (among the rest) and became owner of this piece of public property on usucaption, since also public property may come under private ownership as long as this piece of property is used for 30 consecutive years in good faith, which was completed on 9/11 1915. However, it only until the July 2007 that the Appellate reached a verdict on the same case which vindicated the individual claims on the same argument and which did not even accept the procedural intervention of the Municipality at the Court. This particular verdict constitutes a critical decision for the irrevocable examination of the substance of the case because even attempting to exercise recantation would only affect jurisprudential matters of the case and not the substance of the verdict. In each case, however, the Greek state and the municipality are expected to examine any possible legal means left.

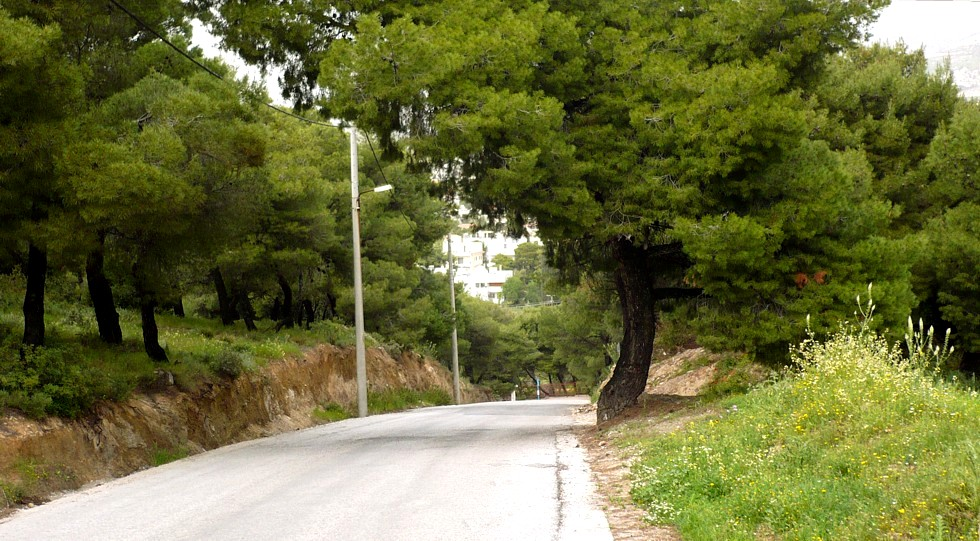
Inside the forested area

On June 29, 2007, only a few weeks after the announcement of the verdict and the refusal of the municipality to accept it, a great fire burst at that specific region, while the fire service was scattered around other great fires all over Greece. Fires consumed several residential buildings and forests, with the blaze lasting during the evening hours and drawing to an end following that. Another fire spread later in the summer, on August 16, 2007, and consumed tens more houses as flames spread on dry grass; if this had been removed, fire would not have spread to buildings. The conflagration entered the settlement in the evening hours. Firefighters arrived to battle the flames along with firetrucks, helicopters and airplanes. The fire burnt for several hours and ended at night. It is only some weeks after the black-letter day, the Great Parnitha Mountain was partially destroyed that this incident came to light. The government fights against the fire and manages to control it with the help of the residents only a few hours before the light comes down. However, that's not the end of the dark summer of 2007 that such incidents happen. The Vrilissia gully is also struck while evidence of arson is found. Even the great Naval Base, a junction of interests, is struck, although the greater part of its reformation project to turn it into a park is completed. Some days afterwards, Nea Penteli and the northern district of Melissia are also struck, while the Marousi Municipality rushes to characterize the great Syggros Park as "Syggros Forest" as smaller incidents of fire take place there. Adjacent Municipalities with forest heritage begin volunteer projects of surveillance by residents (such as Pefki and Vrilissia) while the Chalandri gully is also struck, only a few metres away from the local fire brigade department. The incidents around Attica are numerous (Kalivia Thorikou, Keratea, Imittos and Panio forests etc.) at the same time other Greek peripheries are in danger.

== Sports ==
Vrilissia is the seat of two clubs with Panhellenic titles (championships or cups). ESN Vrilissia (Ekpolitistikos Omilos Neon Vrilissia) has won three titles in Greek Handball competitions and FO Vrilissia (Filathlitikos Omilos Vrilissia) has won titles in Women Volleyball Competitions. Kentavros Vrilissia is the most known football club of Vrilissia.

Sport clubs based in Vrilissia
Club	Founded	Sports	Achievements
ESN Vrilissia	1979	Handball	Panhellenic titles in Handball
FO Vrilissia	1985	Volleyball	Panhellenic titles in Women Volleyball
Kentavros Vrilissia	2003	Football	Earlier presence in Gamma Ethniki

== Population ==
Year	Population
1981	7,587
1991	16,571
2001	25,582
2011	30,741
2021	32,417

source: ESYE, Vrilissia Municipality

== Settlements ==
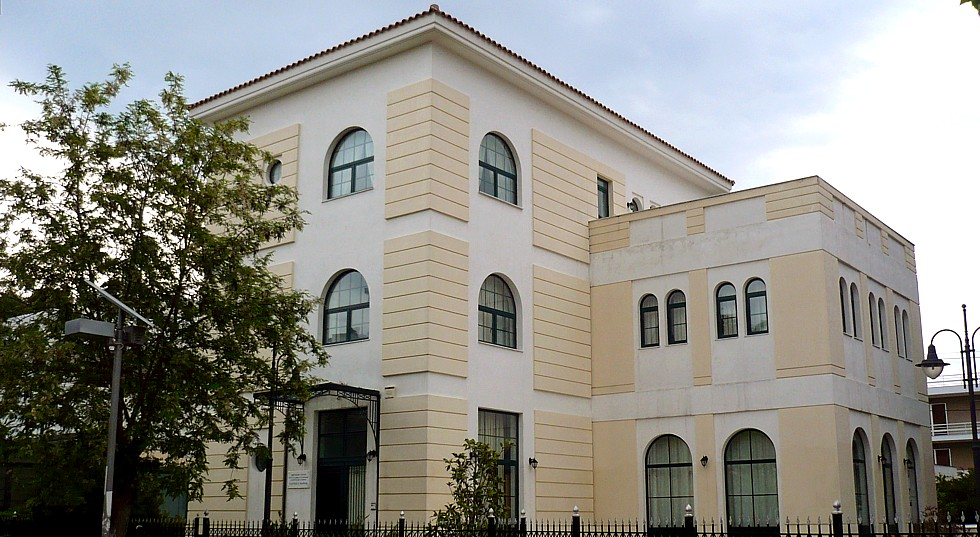
The Analipseos Cultural Hall at Vrilissia

- Analipsi
- Rematia
- Ano Vrilissia
- Patima Hill
- Krassas Settlement
- Doukissis Plakentias Belt

== See also ==
- List of municipalities of Attica
