= 2022–23 Gamma Ethniki =

Greek 3rd tier football season

Gamma Ethniki
- Season: 2022–23
- Promoted: Aiolikos; Kampaniakos; Kozani; Tilikratis; Giouchtas
- Relegated: Pandramaikos; Vyron Kavala; Agrotikos Asteras; Orfeas Xanthi; Alexandroupoli; Megas Alexandros Orfani AEP Kozani; Elassona; Edessaikos; Makedonikos Foufas; Olympiacos Volos; Dotieas Agia Panagriniakos; Apollon Parga; Digenis Neochori; Chalkida; Nafpaktiakos Asteras Finikas Nea Epidavros; Aias Gastouni; Paniliakos; Diavolitsi; Pangitheatikos; APS Patrai Keratsini; Moschato; Poros; Tympaki; Agios Ierotheos
- All statistics correct as of 23 June 2023.

The 2022–23 Gamma Ethniki was the 40th season since the official establishment of the championship in 1983, and the second after the reestablishment as the 3rd tier of the Greek Football. The competition started on 13 November 2022, and was conducted in five groups, in contrast to 2021–22 season, when it was conducted in seven groups. The groups were formed according to geographical criteria. After all games of the five groups are played, the champion of each group qualifies for a playoff round, from which the top four clubs will be promoted to Super League 2.

== Group 1 ==
=== Teams ===
Location of teams in Group 1 of 2022-23 Gamma Ethniki

Team	Location	Last season
Agrotikos Asteras	Evosmos	Group 1, 1st
Alexandroupoli	Alexandroupoli	Group 1, 9th
Apollon Paralimnio	Paralimnio	Group 1, 3rd
Aris Avato	Avato	Group 1, 4th
Doxa Drama	Drama	Group 1, 7th
Kampaniakos	Chalastra	Macedonia FCA Champion
Kavala	Kavala	SL2 North Group 15th
Megas Alexandros Orfani	Orfani	Group 1, 11th
Nestos Chrysoupoli	Chrysoupoli	Group 1, 8th
Orfeas Xanthi	Xanthi	Group 1, 10th
Pandramaikos	Drama	Group 1, 2nd
Panthrakikos	Komotini	Thrace FCA Champion
Poseidon Nea Michaniona	Michaniona	Group 2, 5th
Thermaikos	Thermi	Group 1, 5th
Vyron Kavala	Kavala	Kavala FCA champion

=== Standings ===
Pos	Team	Pld	W	D	L	GF	GA	GD	Pts	Promotion or relegation
1	Kampaniakos (C, Q)	28	17	8	3	50	19	+31	59	Qualification to Play-offs
2	Kavala	28	16	7	5	55	23	+32	55	
3	Poseidon Nea Michaniona	28	16	5	7	40	29	+11	53	
4	Doxa Drama	28	14	7	7	52	32	+20	49	
5	Apollon Paralimnio	28	13	8	7	49	32	+17	47 (Note: Head-to-head results: Apollon Paralimnio - Panthrakikos 1-1, Panthrakikos - Apollon Paralimnio 1-1.)	
6	Panthrakikos	28	13	8	7	44	36	+8	47	
7	Nestos Chrysoupoli	28	11	8	9	38	34	+4	41 (Note: Head-to-head results: Nestos Chrysoupoli - Aris Avato 2-0, Aris Avato - Nestos Chrysoupoli 2-0.)	
8	Aris Avato	28	13	2	13	29	35	−6	41	
9	Thermaikos	28	10	10	8	26	26	0	40	
10	Pandramaikos (R)	28	11	4	13	43	35	+8	37	Relegation to FCA championships
11	Vyron Kavala (R)	28	7	11	10	36	37	−1	32	Relegation to FCA championships
12	Agrotikos Asteras (R)	28	7	9	12	26	41	−15	30 (Note: Head-to-head results: Agrotikos Asteras - Orfeas Xanthi 1-0, Orfeas Xanthi - Agrotikos Asteras 1-1.)	Relegation to FCA championships
13	Orfeas Xanthi (R)	28	8	6	14	31	49	−18	30	Relegation to FCA championships
14	Alexandroupoli (R)	28	2	7	19	17	52	−35	13	Relegation to FCA championships
15	Megas Alexandros Orfani (R)	28	0	4	24	12	68	−56	4	Relegation to FCA championships

Source: Hellenic Football Federation: 2022-23 Match Schedule (Group 1) (in Greek)
Rules for classification: 1) points; 2) head-to-head points; 3) head-to-head goal difference; 4) goal difference; 5) goals scored.
(C) Champions; (Q) Qualified for the phase indicated; (R) Relegated

=== Results ===
Home \ Away	AGR	ALE	APP	AVA	DOX	KMP	KAV	MAO	NES	ORF	PDR	PTH	POS	THE	VYK
Agrotikos Asteras	—	1–0	2–0	1–2	0–3	0–1	1–0	2–0	0–2	1–0	1–1	1–1	0–1	1–1	1–1
Alexandroupoli	2–2	—	0–3	1–2	0–0	1–1	0–2	3–1	1–4	1–2	0–1	0–1	0–1	0–1	2–1
Apollon Paralimnio	1–0	1–1	—	3–1	3–0	1–1	0–1	2–0	2–2	5–1	4–3	1–1	1–0	1–2	1–2
Aris Avato	0–1	1–0	0–3	—	1–0	0–2	1–1	1–0	2–0	1–0	1–0	1–3	1–2	0–1	1–0
Doxa Drama	3–2	3–0	3–1	2–3	—	1–2	1–1	4–1	0–2	6–0	0–0	3–0	2–2	0–0	2–2
Kampaniakos	5–0	4–0	2–2	2–0	2–1	—	0–0	3–0	2–1	2–0	4–3	2–3	2–0	2–0	1–1
Kavala	4–2	4–0	3–0	3–0	3–1	2–1	—	6–0	0–0	3–1	2–0	2–1	2–2	2–0	3–0
Megas Alexandros Orfani	0–2	1–1	0–2	0–4	1–3	0–4	0–2	—	1–1	1–2	0–2	0–0	1–2	0–1	2–3
Nestos Chrysoupoli	4–1	2–2	1–3	2–0	1–2	0–0	0–3	2–1	—	2–1	1–4	3–1	1–0	0–0	1–1
Orfeas Xanthi	1–1	2–1	1–1	0–1	1–1	2–0	2–2	4–0	1–0	—	2–1	2–2	1–2	0–1	1–0
Pandramaikos	1–0	2–0	1–1	3–1	2–3	0–2	2–0	4–0	1–2	5–1	—	4–0	0–1	0–2	2–0
Panthrakikos	2–2	3–0	1–1	2–0	1–2	1–1	3–2	3–1	1–0	3–0	1–0	—	1–0	1–2	2–1
Poseidon Nea Michaniona	0–0	2–0	0–4	1–0	0–1	0–1	1–0	4–1	2–1	2–1	3–1	3–1	—	1–1	4–3
Thermaikos	1–1	1–1	1–2	1–3	0–2	0–0	3–1	1–0	1–2	3–1	0–0	1–1	0–2	—	1–1
Vyron Kavala	4–0	3–0	2–0	1–1	1–3	0–1	1–1	0–0	1–1	1–1	2–0	1–3	2–2	1–0	—

Source: Hellenic Football Federation: 2022-23 Match Schedule (Group 1) (in Greek)
Legend: Blue = home team win; Yellow = draw; Red = away team win.
For upcoming matches, an "a" indicates there is an article about the rivalry between the two participants.

== Group 2 ==
=== Teams ===
Location of teams in Group 2 of 2022-23 Gamma Ethniki

Team	Location	Last season
AEP Kozani	Kozani	Group 2, 3rd
A.O.Chaniotis	Chaniotis	Chalkidiki FCA Champion
Dotieas Agia	Agia	Larissa FCA champion
Edessaikos	Edessa	Group 2, 4th
Ethnikos Neo Keramidi	Neo Keramidi	Group 3, 7th
GAS Svoronos	Svoronos	Pieria FCA champion
Kastoria	Kastoria	Kastoria FCA champion
Kozani	Kozani	Group 2, 1st
Makedonikos Foufas	Foufas	Kozani FCA champion
Olympiacos Volos	Volos	SL2 North Group 16th
Elassona	Elassona	Group 3, 3rd
PAOK Kristoni	Kristoni	Kilkis FCA champion
Pierikos	Katerini	SL2 North Group 14th
Keravnos Anchelochori	Anchelochori	Group 2, 7th (as Thiella Sarakinoi)

=== Standings ===
Pos	Team	Pld	W	D	L	GF	GA	GD	Pts	Promotion or relegation
1	Kozani (C, Q)	26	16	9	1	53	16	+37	57	Qualification to Play-offs
2	Ethnikos Neo Keramidi	26	11	9	6	35	25	+10	42 (Note: Head-to-head results: Ethnikos Neo Keramidi - Keravnos Anchelochori 2-2, Keravnos Anchelochori - Ethnikos Neo Keramidi 0-2.)	
3	Keravnos Anchelochori	26	12	6	8	47	25	+22	42	
4	Chaniotis	26	11	8	7	40	34	+6	41	
5	Pierikos	26	11	6	9	34	27	+7	39 (Note: Head-to-head results: Pierikos - GAS Svoronos 1-2, GAS Svoronos - Pierikos 0-2.)	
6	GAS Svoronos	26	10	9	7	31	29	+2	39	
7	PAOK Kristoni	26	10	7	9	26	36	−10	37	
8	Kastoria	26	9	9	8	23	23	0	36	
9	AEP Kozani (R)	26	10	5	11	40	39	+1	35	Relegation to FCA championships
10	Elassona (R)	26	5	14	7	19	23	−4	29	Relegation to FCA championships
11	Edessaikos (R)	26	7	7	12	25	35	−10	28	Relegation to FCA championships
12	Makedonikos Foufas (R)	26	7	6	13	22	36	−14	27	Relegation to FCA championships
13	Olympiacos Volos (R)	26	6	7	13	16	26	−10	25	Relegation to FCA championships
14	Dotieas Agia (R)	26	5	2	19	14	51	−37	17	Relegation to FCA championships

Source: Hellenic Football Federation: 2022-23 Match Schedule (Group 2) (in Greek)
Rules for classification: 1) points; 2) head-to-head points; 3) head-to-head goal difference; 4) goal difference; 5) goals scored.
(C) Champions; (Q) Qualified for the phase indicated; (R) Relegated

=== Results ===
Home \ Away	AEP	CHA	DOT	EDE	ENK	SVO	KAS	KOZ	MFO	OVL	ELA	PKR	PIE	KER
AEP Kozani	—	2–3	0–0	3–0	1–0	2–4	1–1	0–4	5–0	2–0	0–1	2–2	1–1	1–0
Chaniotis	3–2	—	3–0	0–0	1–2	1–1	1–0	2–2	1–0	1–2	2–1	0–1	2–2	4–3
Dotieas Agia	0–6	2–1	—	1–0	3–4	0–1	0–2	1–5	1–0	0–1	0–1	2–0	0–2	0–5
Edessaikos	1–2	1–0	1–0	—	2–2	1–2	2–2	1–2	2–3	1–2	1–1	1–1	1–0	2–1
Ethnikos Neo Keramidi	5–2	1–4	1–0	1–2	—	1–0	0–0	1–1	1–0	0–0	2–1	5–0	1–1	2–2
GAS Svoronos	3–0	2–2	5–2	1–0	1–0	—	1–1	1–1	1–1	1–0	0–0	2–0	0–2	0–2
Kastoria	2–0	0–1	1–0	1–2	0–0	4–0	—	1–5	0–1	0–0	0–0	0–0	2–1	1–0
Kozani	1–0	4–0	1–0	3–1	1–1	2–0	2–0	—	4–1	1–0	0–0	4–0	2–0	1–2
Makedonikos Foufas	0–1	0–0	1–0	2–0	0–0	3–1	1–0	0–2	—	5–2	1–1	1–1	1–2	0–1
Olympiacos Volos	0–0	1–1	0–1	1–0	0–1	1–0	1–2	1–1	1–0	—	0–1	0–1	0–1	0–1
Elassona	2–3	2–3	1–1	0–0	1–0	0–0	1–1	1–1	1–0	1–1	—	0–1	0–0	1–1
PAOK Kristoni	2–0	3–2	3–0	3–1	0–1	0–0	0–1	1–1	0–0	1–0	2–0	—	1–2	2–1
Pierikos	4–3	0–0	3–0	0–1	2–1	1–2	0–1	0–1	2–1	1–0	1–1	6–1	—	0–1
Keravnos Anchelochori	0–1	0–2	3–0	1–1	0–2	2–2	3–0	1–1	6–0	2–2	2–0	4–0	3–0	—

Source: Hellenic Football Federation: 2022-23 Match Schedule (Group 2) (in Greek)
Legend: Blue = home team win; Yellow = draw; Red = away team win.
For upcoming matches, an "a" indicates there is an article about the rivalry between the two participants.

== Group 3 ==
=== Teams ===
Location of teams in Group 3 of 2022-23 Gamma Ethniki

Team	Location	Last season
Apollon Parga	Parga	Preveza-Lefkada FCA champion
Asteras Petriti	Petriti	Kerkyra FCA champion
Chalkida	Chalcis	Euboea FCA champion
Digenis Neochori	Oichalia	Trikala FCA champion
Lefkimmi	Lefkimmi	Group 2, 6th
Nafpaktiakos Asteras	Nafpaktos	Group 4, 5th
Fiki	Fiki	Group 3, 6th
Panagriniakos	Agrinio	Group 4, 7th
Panelefsiniakos	Eleusis	Group 6, 3rd
Tilikratis	Lefkada	Group 4, 2nd
Trikala	Trikala	SL2 North Group 17th
Vyzas	Megara	West Attica FCA champion
Ypato	Ypato	Group 3, 2nd
Zakynthos	Zakynthos	SL2 South Group 17th

=== Standings ===
Pos	Team	Pld	W	D	L	GF	GA	GD	Pts	Promotion or relegation
1	Tilikratis (C, Q)	26	18	5	3	58	15	+43	59	Qualification to Play-offs
2	Ypato	26	18	4	4	44	9	+35	58	
3	Panelefsiniakos	26	17	6	3	60	17	+43	57	
4	Fiki	26	14	4	8	40	24	+16	46	
5	Vyzas	26	11	9	6	44	23	+21	42	
6	Trikala	26	12	4	10	36	32	+4	40	
7	Asteras Petriti	26	11	5	10	26	34	−8	38	
8	Lefkimmi	26	10	6	10	30	34	−4	36 (Note: Head to head results: Lefkimmi - Zakynthos 0-0, Zakynthos - Lefkimmi 2-5.)	
9	Zakynthos	26	10	6	10	33	34	−1	36	
10	Panagriniakos (R)	26	7	7	12	39	42	−3	28	Relegation to FCA championships
11	Apollon Parga (R)	26	5	8	13	29	35	−6	23	Relegation to FCA championships
12	Digenis Neochori (R)	26	5	7	14	15	35	−20	22	Relegation to FCA championships
13	Chalkida (R)	26	3	5	18	15	74	−59	14	Relegation to FCA championships
14	Nafpaktiakos Asteras (R)	26	3	0	23	9	70	−61	9	Relegation to FCA championships

Source: Hellenic Football Federation: 2022-23 Match Schedule (Group 3) (in Greek)
Rules for classification: 1) points; 2) head-to-head points; 3) head-to-head goal difference; 4) goal difference; 5) goals scored.
(C) Champions; (Q) Qualified for the phase indicated; (R) Relegated

=== Results ===
Home \ Away	APA	ASP	CHA	DIG	LEF	NAF	FIK	PAG	PEL	TIL	TRI	VYZ	YPA	ZAK
Apollon Parga	—	0–0	7–0	0–0	2–0	3–0	0–1	1–1	0–2	0–2	3–1	0–0	1–3	0–0
Asteras Petriti	1–0	—	3–0	2–1	1–0	2–0	0–2	2–1	2–1	1–1	1–2	3–2	0–2	1–1
Chalkida	1–0	1–1	—	0–1	2–2	1–0	1–3	1–1	0–6	0–4	0–3	1–1	0–2	0–4
Digenis Neochori	0–0	0–1	0–2	—	0–0	3–0	2–1	0–2	0–1	0–2	0–2	0–0	0–3	0–1
Lefkimmi	3–1	0–0	1–0	1–0	—	4–0	0–0	2–0	1–1	2–4	1–0	2–4	0–3	0–0
Nafpaktiakos Asteras	0–1	2–1	3–2	0–2	0–2	—	1–0	1–2	0–5	0–3	1–3	0–4	0–5	1–2
Fiki	2–1	2–0	8–0	0–0	3–0	3–0	—	4–2	0–1	2–1	2–0	0–0	0–1	3–2
Panagriniakos	3–3	1–2	5–0	2–3	1–2	3–0	2–3	—	0–1	0–3	6–3	1–0	1–1	2–2
Panelefsiniakos	3–2	5–0	5–1	5–0	4–0	2–0	4–0	0–0	—	1–1	1–3	3–0	0–0	3–2
Tilikratis	1–0	4–0	3–0	2–0	2–0	5–0	2–0	4–1	1–1	—	3–2	5–0	2–1	2–0
Trikala	4–0	3–0	2–2	2–2	0–1	1–0	0–0	0–1	1–0	1–1	—	0–1	1–0	1–0
Vyzas	1–1	0–2	5–0	3–0	2–1	7–0	3–0	0–0	1–1	1–0	4–0	—	0–0	4–0
Ypato	2–1	2–0	1–0	2–0	2–0	3–0	1–0	2–0	1–2	0–0	2–0	2–0	—	3–0
Zakynthos	4–2	1–0	3–0	1–1	2–5	1–0	0–1	2–1	1–2	2–0	0–1	1–1	1–0	—

Source: Hellenic Football Federation: 2022-23 Match Schedule (Group 3) (in Greek)
Legend: Blue = home team win; Yellow = draw; Red = away team win.
For upcoming matches, an "a" indicates there is an article about the rivalry between the two participants.

== Group 4 ==
=== Teams ===
Location of teams in Group 4 of 2021-22 Gamma Ethniki

Team	Location	Last season
Aias Gastouni	Gastouni	Group 4, 6th
Aiolikos	Lesvos	Group 6, 5th
A.O. Diavolitsi	Diavolitsi	Group 4, 3rd
Enosi Ermionida	Kranidi	Group 5, 7th
Finikas Nea Epidavros	Nea Epidavros	Group 5, 5th
Ialysos	Ialysos	Dodecanese FCA champion
Mykonos	Mykonos	Group 5, 4th
Panargiakos	Argos	Argolis FCA champion
Pangitheatikos	Gythio	Laconia FCA champion
Paniliakos	Pirgos	Elis FCA champion
Panionios	Nea Smyrni	Group 7, 2nd
Pyli Kos	Kos	Group 6, 6th
A.P.S. Patrai	Patras	Achaea FCA champion
Rodos	Rhodes	SL2 South Group, 16th

=== Standings ===
Pos	Team	Pld	W	D	L	GF	GA	GD	Pts	Promotion or relegation
1	Aiolikos (C, Q)	26	20	1	5	50	17	+33	61	Qualification to Play-offs
2	Rodos	26	19	1	6	50	19	+31	58	
3	Panionios	26	15	9	2	46	12	+34	54	
4	Mykonos	26	13	9	4	31	16	+15	48	
5	Panargiakos	26	11	7	8	38	21	+17	40 (Note: Head to head results: Panargiakos - Ialysos 1-0, Ialysos - Panargiakos 2-1.)	
6	Ialysos	26	11	7	8	36	26	+10	40	
7	Finikas Nea Epidavros (Note: Finikas Nea Epidavros were relegated to FCA championships due to financial problems.) (R)	26	11	5	10	41	37	+4	38	Relegation to FCA championships
8	Ermionida	26	11	4	11	39	39	0	37	
9	Pyli Kos	26	10	6	10	35	29	+6	36	
10	Aias Gastouni (R)	26	9	3	14	33	45	−12	30	Relegation to FCA championships
11	Paniliakos (R)	26	7	5	14	20	50	−30	26	Relegation to FCA championships
12	A.O. Diavolitsi (R)	26	3	8	15	17	45	−28	17	Relegation to FCA championships
13	Pangitheatikos (R)	26	2	6	18	18	58	−40	12 (Note: Head to head results: Pangitheatikos - A.P.S. Patrai 3-2, A.P.S. Patrai - Pangitheatikos 1-0.)	Relegation to FCA championships
14	A.P.S. Patrai (R)	26	3	3	20	17	57	−40	12	Relegation to FCA championships

Source: Hellenic Football Federation: 2022-23 Match Schedule (Group 4) (in Greek)
Rules for classification: 1) points; 2) head-to-head points; 3) head-to-head goal difference; 4) goal difference; 5) goals scored.
(C) Champions; (Q) Qualified for the phase indicated; (R) Relegated

=== Results ===
Home \ Away	AIA	AIO	DIA	ERM	FNE	IAL	MYK	PAR	PGT	PIL	PIO	KOS	PAT	ROD
Aias Gastouni	—	0–1	5–0	1–3	3–4	2–1	0–3	1–1	4–2	3–0	0–2	1–0	2–1	1–2
Aiolikos	2–1	—	3–0	3–0	2–3	2–1	1–0	0–1	6–2	6–0	2–1	2–0	3–0 (Note: Originally scheduled to be played on 8 April 2023, the match Aiolikos – Patrai was not conducted, as Patrai did not travel to Mytilene. The match was forfeited 3–0 to Aiolikos.)	2–1
A.O. Diavolitsi	0–2	0–1	—	0–0	2–1	0–1	0–1	1–3	1–1	1–1	1–3	3–0	2–1	1–4
Ermionida	1–1	0–4	3–1	—	2–0	2–1	1–2	1–0	3–0	6–3	0–0	2–1	5–0	1–0
Finikas Nea Epidavros	2–0	0–1	1–1	3–2	—	2–4	1–0	0–0	3–0	2–1	0–2	4–1	4–0	1–3
Ialysos	2–0	1–2	2–1	1–0	2–0	—	1–1	2–1	2–0	1–1	0–0	2–2	3–0	1–1
Mykonos	3–0	1–0	0–0	1–0	0–0	3–1	—	1–1	2–1	1–0	1–1	0–0	1–0	3–0
Panargiakos	1–1	0–1	5–0	2–0	1–1	1–0	1–1	—	4–1	3–0	0–3	1–2	4–0	1–2
Pangitheatikos	1–2	1–2	0–0	1–1	1–4	0–1	0–2	0–2	—	1–1	0–2	1–1	3–2	2–1
Paniliakos	1–0	0–1	1–0	2–1	2–1	0–4	1–0	0–2	0–0	—	0–0	1–3	2–1	2–1
Panionios	4–1	1–1	1–1	4–1	3–1	2–0	1–1	0–0	5–0	3–0	—	3–1	1–0	1–0
Pyli Kos	3–0	0–1	2–1	3–1	0–1	1–1	1–1	2–1	3–0 (Note: The match was scheduled for Wednesday, 15 March 2023. The match was forfeited 3–0 in favour of Pyli Kos, since Pangitheatikos decided not to travel, as the match was scheduled for a weekday and the team was at last place at the time and composed of several footballers-students.)	3–0	0–0	—	5–0	0–1
A.P.S Patrai	1–2	1–0	0–0	1–2	2–2	1–1	1–2	0–2	1–0	3–1	0–3	0–1	—	0–3
Rodos	4–0	2–1	3–0 (Note: Diavolitsi did not field a lineup for the match against Rodos, therefore the match was forfeited 3-0 to Rodos.)	4–1	2–0	1–0	3–0 (Note: Mykonos did not field a lineup for the match against Rodos, therefore the match was forfeited 3-0 to Rodos.)	1–0	3–0	3–0 (Note: Originally scheduled to be played on 12 April 2023, the match Rodos – Paniliakos was not conducted, as Paniliakos did not travel to Rhodes. The match was forfeited 3–0 to Rodos.)	1–0	1–0	3–1	—

Source: Hellenic Football Federation: 2022-23 Match Schedule (Group 4) (in Greek)
Legend: Blue = home team win; Yellow = draw; Red = away team win.
For upcoming matches, an "a" indicates there is an article about the rivalry between the two participants.

== Group 5 ==
=== Teams ===
Location of teams in Group 6 of 2021-22 Gamma Ethniki

Team	Location	Last season
Agia Paraskevi	Agia Paraskevi	Athens FCA Group 1 champion
Agios Ierotheos	Peristeri	Group 5, 6th
ΑΟ Agios Nikolaos	Agios Nikolaos	Group 7, 4th
Aris Petroupolis	Petroupoli	Athens FCA Group 3 champion
Ethnikos Piraeus	Piraeus	Group 6, 2nd
Fostiras	Tavros	Group 5, 2nd
GPS Almyros	Gazi	Group 7, 6th
Giouchtas	Archanes	Group 7, 5th
Keratsini	Keratsini	Group 6, 7th
Marko	Markopoulo	East Attica FCA champion
Poros	Heraklion (Poros neighborhood)	Group 7, 3rd
A.E. Moschato	Moschato	Piraeus FCA Group 2 2nd
Thyella Rafina	Rafina (Diastavrosi neighborhood)	Group 6, 4th
Tympaki	Tympaki	Heraklion FCA champion

=== Standings ===
Pos	Team	Pld	W	D	L	GF	GA	GD	Pts	Promotion or relegation
1	Giouchtas (C, Q)	26	13	11	2	38	18	+20	50	Qualification to Play-offs
2	Marko	26	12	10	4	31	11	+20	46	
3	Thyella Rafina	26	13	3	10	39	27	+12	42	
4	Fostiras	26	10	10	6	38	20	+18	40 (Note: Head-to-head results: Fostiras - Ethnikos Piraeus 0-0, Ethnikos Piraeus - Fostiras 0-0.)	
5	Ethnikos Piraeus	26	9	13	4	25	14	+11	40	
6	Agia Paraskevi	26	8	13	5	29	22	+7	37 (Note: Head-to-head points (goals): Agia Paraskevi 10 (8-5), Almyros 9 (7-5), Agios Nikolaos 6 (8-10), Aris Petroupolis 5 (5-8).)	
7	GPS Almyros	26	10	7	9	40	30	+10	37	
8	Agios Nikolaos	26	9	10	7	33	26	+7	37	
9	Aris Petroupolis	26	9	10	7	32	24	+8	37	
10	Keratsini (R)	26	8	12	6	31	20	+11	36	Relegation to FCA championships
11	Α.Ε. Moschato (R)	26	10	3	13	30	42	−12	33	Relegation to FCA championships
12	Poros (Note: Poros has 3 points deducted, from the HFF for illegal player participation. The game Poros - Agia Paraskevi originally finished 1-0 for Poros, but was awarded 0-3 to Agia Paraskevi for irregular participation of Iraklis Kaminiotis for Poros.) (R)	26	8	8	10	29	32	−3	29	Relegation to FCA championships
13	Tympaki (R)	26	4	5	17	24	49	−25	17	Relegation to FCA championships
14	Agios Ierotheos (R)	26	0	3	23	11	95	−84	3	Relegation to FCA championships

Source: Hellenic Football Federation: 2022-23 Match Schedule (Group 5) (in Greek)
Rules for classification: 1) points; 2) head-to-head points; 3) head-to-head goal difference; 4) goal difference; 5) goals scored.
(C) Champions; (Q) Qualified for the phase indicated; (R) Relegated

=== Results ===
Home \ Away	APA	AIE	ANI	APE	ETH	FOS	ALM	GIO	KER	MAR	POR	MOS	THY	TYM
Agia Paraskevi	—	2–0	2–2	2–0	2–2	0–1	1–0	0–0	0–4	1–1	1–1	1–3	1–1	2–1
Agios Ierotheos	0–5	—	1–2	0–3	1–3	1–7	1–2	0–2	0–4	0–5	1–5	0–2	1–3	1–1
Agios Nikolaos	1–1	8–0	—	2–1	1–1	1–1	1–1	1–1	0–0	1–0	2–0	1–0	1–0	2–0
Aris Petroupolis	1–1	3–1	2–1	—	0–0	1–1	0–0	2–0	1–1	0–0	3–1	3–1	2–1	1–1
Ethnikos Piraeus	1–1	0–0	1–0	1–0	—	0–0	1–1	1–2	2–0	0–0	0–0	1–0	2–0	3–0
Fostiras	0–1	7–0	2–2	1–0	0–0	—	2–0	2–3	1–1	0–1	2–0	2–0	1–0	2–0
GPS Almyros	1–1	3–0 (Note: On 2 April 2023, with the match GPS Almyros - Agios Ierotheos at 1-0, Agios Ierotheos had only 6 players on the pitch, therefore the match was forfeited 0–3 in favor of GPS Almyros.)	3–1	2–1	2–1	2–0	—	2–2	1–1	1–0	0–0	7–2	2–3	5–0
Giouchtas	0–0	3–0 (Note: Originally scheduled to be played on 12 April 2023, the match Giouchtas – Agios Ierotheos was not conducted, as Agios Ierotheos did not travel to Crete. The match was forfeited 3–0 to Giouchtas.)	2–0	1–1	0–0	1–1	2–1	—	1–1	0–0	1–2	4–0	2–1	5–1
Keratsini	0–0	5–0	0–1	0–0	0–0	0–2	2–1	0–0	—	1–1	3–1	1–0	1–0	2–2
Marko	0–0	5–0	2–0	1–0	0–2	1–0	1–0	0–0	0–0	—	0–0	3–0	2–1	3–0
Poros	0–3 (Note: Game originally finished 1-0 for Poros, but was awarded 0-3 to Agia Paraskevi because of illegal participation of Iraklis Kaminiotis for Poros.)	5–1	1–1	3–1	0–0	0–0	2–1	1–2	0–1	1–0	—	4–3	0–0	1–0
A.E. Moschato	1–0	1–0	0–0	0–2	2–1	1–1	0–1	0–1	2–1	2–2	2–0	—	1–0	2–0
Thyella Rafina	1–0	7–0	2–0	1–1	1–0	3–1	2–1	1–2	2–1	1–2	2–1	3–1	—	2–1
Tympaki	0–1	2–2	2–1	1–3	1–2	1–1	3–0	0–1	2–1	0–1	2–0	3–4	0–1	—

Source: Hellenic Football Federation: 2022-23 Match Schedule (Group 5) (in Greek)
Legend: Blue = home team win; Yellow = draw; Red = away team win.
For upcoming matches, an "a" indicates there is an article about the rivalry between the two participants.

== Play-off round ==
The five champions from Regular season played in a double round-robin tournament for four places in 2023–24 Super League Greece 2.

Pos	Team	Pld	W	D	L	GF	GA	GD	Pts	Promotion or relegation	AIO	KMP	KOZ	TIL	GIO
1	Aiolikos (P)	8	4	1	3	10	10	0	13	Promotion to Super League 2	—	2–0	2–0	2–1	2–2
2	Kampaniakos (P)	8	3	3	2	10	8	+2	12	Promotion to Super League 2	2–0	—	3–1	1–1	2–0
3	Kozani (P)	8	4	0	4	8	8	0	12	Promotion to Super League 2	2–0	2–0	—	1–0	1–0
4	Tilikratis (P)	8	2	3	3	7	8	−1	9	Promotion to Super League 2	1–2	1–1	1–0	—	1–0
5	Giouchtas (Note: Giouchtas was promoted to Super League 2 after Apollon Smyrnis F.C. withdrew from the Super League 2.) (P)	8	2	3	3	8	9	−1	9	Promotion to Super League 2	2–0	1–1	2–1	1–1	—

Source: Hellenic Football Federation (in Greek)
Legend: Blue = home team win; Yellow = draw; Red = away team win.
Rules for classification: 1) points; 2) head-to-head points; 3) head-to-head goal difference; 4) goal difference; 5) goals scored.
(P) Promoted
