= 2023–24 Gamma Ethniki =

Greek 3rd tier football season

Gamma Ethniki
- Season: 2023–24
- Dates: 17 September 2023 - 28 April 2024
- Champions: Kavala (Group 1); Ethnikos Neo Keramidi (Group 2); Panargiakos (Group 3); Panionios (Group 4)
- Promoted: Kavala (Group 1); Ethnikos Neo Keramidi (Group 2); Panargiakos (Group 3); Panionios (Group 4)
- Relegated: Group 1: Niki Efkarpia; Doxa Drama; Veria; Aetos Varvara; Aris Peteino; Anagennisi Epanomi; Megas Alexandros Agia Marina; Keravnos Angelochori Group 2: Kileler; Eordaikos; Thyella Katsikas; Kastoria; Vataniakos; Lefkimmi; Fiki; Magnisiakos Group 3: Messolonghi; Ermionida; Erani Filiatra; Ialysos; Vyzas; Panelefsiniakos; Pyli Kos; PAO Varda Group 4: Almyros Gazi; Ypato; Ellopiakos; Proodeftiki; Atromitos Piraeus; Agia Paraskevi; Fostiras; Peramaikos; Ermis Zoniana; Episkopi; Apollon Smyrnis
- Matches: 1,225
- Goals: 3,100 (2.53 per match)
- Top goalscorer: Franco Shea (28 goals) (Nestos)
- Biggest home win: Panionios - Ermis Zoniana 7-1 (05.12.2023)
- Highest scoring: Panionios - Ermis Zoniana 7-1 (05.12.2023); Vyzas - Panelefsiniakos 4-4 (23.04.2024)

The 2023–24 Gamma Ethniki was the 42nd season since the official establishment of the championship in 1982 and the 3rd tier of Greek football after the restructuring of 2021. It has an amateur character, while the Hellenic Football Federation (HFF) is responsible for the conduct of the championship.

The competition started on 17 September 2023 and concluded on 28 April 2024, and was conducted in four groups, in contrast to 2022–23 season, when it was conducted in five groups. 72 teams were participating and 30 of them were relegated at the end of the season. The groups were formed according to geographical criteria.

Promoted to
2024–25 Super League Greece 2
Kavala (from Group 1)
Ethnikos Neo Keramidi (from Group 2)
Panargiakos (from Group 3)
Panionios (from Group 4)

== Way of Conduct ==
After all games of the four groups are played, the champion of each group will be promoted to Super League 2. The seven last teams of each group will be relegated to Local FCA Championships and also 2 more teams will be relegated after a single play-out game in neutral ground. The 11th team of the 1st group will play against the 11th team of the 2nd group and the 11th team of the 3rd group against the 11th team of the 4th group.

== Group 1 ==
=== Teams ===
Location of teams in Group 1 of 2023-24 Gamma Ethniki

Team	Location	Last season
Aetos Varvara	Varvara	Chalkidiki FCA Champion
Anagennisi Epanomi	Epanomi	Macedonia FCA 2nd
Apollon Paralimnio	Paralimnio	Group 1, 5th
Aris Avato	Avato	Group 1, 8th
Aris Peteino	Peteino	Xanthi FCA Champion
Veria	Veria	SL2 North Group 12th
Doxa Drama	Drama	Group 1, 4th
Thermaikos	Thermi	Group 1, 9th
Keravnos Angelochori	Angelochori	Group 2, 3rd
Kavala	Kavala	Group 1, 2nd
PAOK Kristoni	Kristoni	Group 2, 7th
Megas Alexandros Agia Marina	Agia Marina	Imathia FCA champion
Nestos Chrysoupoli	Chrysoupoli	Group 1, 7th
Niki Efkarpia	Efkarpia	Macedonia FCA Champion
Orestis Orestiada	Orestiada	Evros FCA Champion
Panthrakikos	Komotini	Group 1, 6th
Poseidon Nea Michaniona	Michaniona	Group 1, 3rd
Chaniotis	Chaniotis	Group 2, 4th

=== Standings ===
Pos	Team	Pld	W	D	L	GF	GA	GD	Pts	Promotion or relegation
1	Kavala (C, P)	34	32	1	1	89	11	+78	97	Promotion to Super League 2
2	Nestos Chrysoupoli	34	25	6	3	75	19	+56	81	
3	Panthrakikos	34	23	8	3	69	18	+51	77	
4	Chaniotis	34	16	9	9	49	33	+16	57	
5	Aris Avato	34	15	10	9	48	33	+15	55	
6	Poseidon Nea Michaniona	34	17	4	13	55	29	+26	55	
7	Thermaikos	34	16	7	11	42	35	+7	55	
8	PAOK Kristoni	34	16	6	12	43	41	+2	54	
9	Orestis Orestiada	34	15	9	10	49	46	+3	54	
10	Apollon Paralimnio	34	14	10	10	54	37	+17	52	
11	Niki Efkarpia (R)	34	13	10	11	49	40	+9	49	Relegation to Local FCA championships
12	Doxa Drama (R)	34	12	8	14	56	40	+16	44	Relegation to Local FCA championships
13	Veria (R)	34	8	8	18	28	55	−27	32	Relegation to Local FCA championships
14	Aris Peteino (R)	34	6	5	23	24	67	−43	23	Relegation to Local FCA championships
15	Aetos Varvara (R)	34	6	4	24	26	92	−66	22	Relegation to Local FCA championships
16	Anagennisi Epanomi (R)	34	3	10	21	18	66	−48	19	Relegation to Local FCA championships
17	Megas Alexandros Agia Marina (R)	34	2	8	24	18	65	−47	14	Relegation to Local FCA championships
18	Keravnos Angelochori (Note: Keravnos Angelochori withdrew from the league in December 2023, before the 14th matchday.) (R)	34	4	3	27	17	82	−65	0	Withdrew

Source: Hellenic Football Federation: 2023-24 Match Schedule (Group 1) (in Greek)
Rules for classification: 1) points; 2) head-to-head points; 3) head-to-head goal difference; 4) goal difference; 5) goals scored.
(C) Champions; (P) Promoted; (R) Relegated

=== Results ===
Home \ Away	AET	ANE	APP	AVA	APE	CHA	DOX	KAV	KER	MAM	NES	NEF	ORO	PKR	PTH	POS	THE	VER
Aetos Varvara	—	0–1	0–2	1–4	2–1	0–0	2–1	0–7	3–0 (Note: Keravnos Angelochori lost the game 3–0 on forfeit, having withdrawn from the league.)	2–0	1–2	2–2	2–3	0–2	0–5	1–4	0–2	3–0
Anagennisi Epanomi	0–1	—	1–1	0–3	2–2	0–3	0–3	0–1	1–2	1–1	0–0	0–1	1–1	1–3	0–1	0–5	0–3	0–3
Apollon Paralimnio	7–0	1–1	—	3–0	2–0	1–1	2–1	0–2	3–0	2–0	0–2	2–0	5–1	1–2	1–3	0–0	0–0	3–0
Aris Avato	4–1	0–0	2–0	—	2–0	0–0	3–2	0–1	3–0	5–0	0–1	0–0	0–0	1–1	0–3	2–1	1–2	3–0
Aris Peteino	1–1	3–2	0–0	1–2	—	1–2	1–1	0–5	0–2	1–0	0–2	1–2	1–2	0–1	0–4	0–3	0–2	1–0
Chaniotis	3–0	0–0	1–2	0–0	1–0	—	2–1	0–2	3–0	3–1	0–2	2–0	0–0	3–2	0–1	0–2	3–0	2–2
Doxa Drama	5–1	6–0	0–1	2–0	2–1	1–1	—	0–1	3–0	4–1	0–0	0–0	0–0	2–0	1–2	2–1	2–1	4–1
Kavala	5–0	4–0	3–1	2–0	1–0	3–1	3–1	—	3–0	5–1	1–0	4–1	5–1	2–0	0–0	3–1	3–0	6–1
Keravnos Angelochori	3–0	0–3	0–1	2–2	0–3	1–4	0–3	0–3	—	1–1	0–3	0–3	0–3	0–3	0–2	0–3	0–3	2–1
Megas Alexandros Agia Marina	2–2	0–1	0–1	0–1	1–1	2–5	1–1	1–0	3–0	—	0–5	1–2	0–1	0–0	0–1	1–1	0–1	0–0
Nestos Chrysoupoli	3–0	4–0	4–2	1–1	4–0	2–0	3–2	0–3	3–0	2–0	—	2–1	6–1	4–1	1–1	3–0	4–0	4–1
Niki Efkarpia	7–0	1–1	2–2	3–0	5–0	2–1	1–1	0–1	2–2	1–0	0–0	—	3–2	3–1	1–2	1–3	2–0	1–1
Orestis Orestiada	2–0	5–0	2–1	3–2	0–2	2–2	1–0	0–2	2–1	3–0	2–0	3–0	—	2–1	0–2	0–0	0–0	3–0
PAOK Kristoni	2–0	1–0	3–3	0–0	1–0	0–2	2–1	2–3	2–1	2–1	0–3	2–0	2–0	—	2–3	1–0	0–2	1–0
Panthrakikos	4–0	2–0	2–1	1–1	6–0	3–0	1–0	0–1	3–0	1–0	0–1	0–0	2–2	1–1	—	2–0	2–2	5–0
Poseidon Nea Michaniona	4–0	2–0	2–1	0–1	3–0	0–1	4–2	0–1	3–0	4–0	1–2	2–0	4–1	1–0	0–2	—	1–0	0–0
Thermaikos	2–1	2–1	1–1	1–3	3–0	0–1	2–1	0–2	1–0	4–0	1–1	0–1	1–1	1–1	2–1	1–0	—	1–0
Veria	2–0	1–1	1–1	1–2	1–3	0–2	1–1	0–1	3–0	1–0	0–1	2–1	1–0	0–1	1–1	1–0	2–1	—

Source: Hellenic Football Federation: 2023-24 Match Schedule (Group 1) (in Greek)
Legend: Blue = home team win; Yellow = draw; Red = away team win.
For upcoming matches, an "a" indicates there is an article about the rivalry between the two participants.

== Group 2 ==
=== Teams ===
Location of teams in Group 2 of 2023-24 Gamma Ethniki

Team	Location	Last season
Anagennisi Arta	Arta	Arta FCA Champion
Asteras Petriti	Petriti	Group 3, 7th
Asteras Stavros	Stavros	Phthiotis FCA Champion
Vataniakos	Katerini (Vatan neighborhood)	Pieria FCA Champion
Ethnikos Neo Keramidi	Neo Keramidi	Group 2, 2nd
Eordaikos	Ptolemaida	Kozani FCA Champion
Zakynthos	Zakynthos	Group 3, 9th
Thesprotos	Igoumenitsa	SL2 North Group 14th
Kastoria	Kastoria	Group 2, 8th
Kileler	Kileler	Larissa FCA Champion
Lefkimmi	Lefkimmi	Group 3, 8th
Magnisiakos	Volos	Thessaly FCA Champion
Nea Artaki	Nea Artaki	Euboea FCA Champion
Pierikos	Katerini	Group 2, 5th
Svoronos	Svoronos	Group 2, 6th
Trikala	Trikala	Group 3, 6th
Fiki	Fiki	Group 3, 4th
Thyella Katsikas	Katsikas	Epirus FCA Champion

=== Standings ===
Pos	Team	Pld	W	D	L	GF	GA	GD	Pts	Promotion or relegation
1	Ethnikos Neo Keramidi (C, P)	34	24	6	4	57	18	+39	78	Promotion to Super League 2
2	Nea Artaki	34	23	7	4	62	19	+43	76	
3	Svoronos	34	21	9	4	63	23	+40	72	
4	Zakynthos	34	16	10	8	50	30	+20	58	
5	Pierikos	34	16	7	11	49	27	+22	55	
6	Anagennisi Arta	34	16	6	12	35	33	+2	54	
7	Kileler (R)	34	15	8	11	36	22	+14	53	Withdrew
8	Asteras Stavros	34	15	7	12	38	35	+3	52	
9	Trikala	34	14	10	10	49	37	+12	52	
10	Thesprotos	34	16	4	14	54	45	+9	52	
11	Asteras Petriti	34	15	5	14	36	38	−2	50	
12	Eordaikos (R)	34	13	11	10	40	31	+9	50	Relegation to Local FCA championships
13	Thyella Katsikas (R)	34	13	9	12	49	32	+17	48	Relegation to Local FCA championships
14	Lefkimmi (R)	34	9	6	19	38	52	−14	33	Relegation to Local FCA championships
15	Kastoria (R)	34	9	6	19	35	52	−17	33	Relegation to Local FCA championships
16	Vataniakos (R)	34	8	7	19	36	67	−31	31	Relegation to Local FCA championships
17	Fiki (Note: Fiki withdrew from the league in December 2023, before the 15th round.) (R)	33	2	1	30	12	90	−78	−8	Withdrew
18	Magnisiakos (Note: On November 19, 2023, Magnisiakos withdrew from the league because of financial problems.) (R)	33	0	1	32	1	89	−88	−14	Withdrew

Source: Hellenic Football Federation: 2023-24 Match Schedule (Group 2) (in Greek)
Rules for classification: 1) points; 2) head-to-head points; 3) head-to-head goal difference; 4) goal difference; 5) goals scored.
(C) Champions; (P) Promoted; (R) Relegated

=== Results ===
Home \ Away	ANA	ASP	ASS	EOR	ENK	FIK	KAS	KIL	LEF	MAG	NAR	PIE	SVO	THE	THK	TRI	VAT	ZAK
Anagennisi Arta	—	0–1	1–0	0–2	0–1	3–0 (Note: Fiki lost the game 3–0 on forfeit, having withdrawn from the league.)	0–0	0–2	1–0	3–0 (Note: Magnisiakos lost the game 3–0 on forfeit, having withdrawn from the league.)	0–0	2–1	0–0	1–0	3–1	1–0	2–2	1–0
Asteras Petriti	2–0	—	2–0	1–0	0–3	3–0	1–0	0–1	0–2	3–0	1–0	2–1	1–2	0–0	2–2	3–0	2–0	0–1
Asteras Stavros	0–2	2–1	—	0–2	1–0	3–0	2–0	0–1	3–2	0–0	2–0	0–0	0–0	0–0	3–2	1–0	5–0	1–0
Eordaikos	1–0	1–2	1–1	—	1–0	3–0	2–1	1–0	1–1	3–0	0–2	1–0	0–0	3–3	0–2	5–1	1–2	0–0
Ethnikos Neo Keramidi	2–0	2–0	2–0	1–0	—	3–0	4–1	2–0	2–0	3–0	1–0	2–1	1–3	3–2	1–0	2–2	3–1	0–1
Fiki	0–2	2–2	0–2	1–0	0–2	—	0–3	0–3	0–3	3–0	0–3	0–3	0–3	0–3	0–3	0–3	1–2	0–3
Kastoria	4–0	0–2	0–1	0–1	0–2	3–1	—	0–1	1–1	3–0	0–0	0–1	0–4	0–1	0–2	1–4	3–3	0–2
Kileler	0–1	2–0	2–0	1–1	1–1	3–0	0–1	—	1–0	3–0 (Note: On 29 October 2023, Magnisiakos did not field a lineup against Kileler, losing the game 3–0 on forfeit.)	0–1	2–0	1–3	3–1	1–1	0–0	2–1	0–0
Lefkimmi	1–2	1–1	2–0	0–0	0–2	3–0	1–1	0–1	—	3–0	4–1	0–2	0–3	1–3	1–0	0–1	2–2	1–2
Magnisiakos	0–3 (Note: On 5 November 2023, Magnisiakos did not field a lineup against Anagennisi Arta, losing the game 3–0 on forfeit.)	0–3	0–3	0–3	1–2	Ν/Α (Note: The two teams have withdrawn from the championship and therefore their match won't take place at all.)	0–3	0–3	0–1	—	0–2	0–1	0–3	0–3	0–3	0–3	0–3	0–3
Nea Artaki	4–0	2–0	4–1	3–0	1–1	3–0	3–0	2–0	3–1	3–0	—	1–0	0–0	2–1	1–1	4–2	1–0	1–0
Pierikos	1–2	4–0	2–0	1–0	0–2	5–1	1–1	1–0	5–0	3–0	2–3	—	2–0	4–0	1–1	2–0	2–1	0–0
Svoronos	2–0	4–0	2–2	4–2	0–0	2–0	4–2	1–0	2–0	3–0	0–0	2–0	—	3–2	0–2	0–2	2–1	4–1
Thesprotos	2–1	2–0	1–2	0–1	1–1	3–0	0–1	2–1	1–3	2–0	0–1	3–1	0–3	—	2–0	3–1	2–1	2–0
Thyella Katsikas	2–0	1–0	3–0	0–0	1–2	4–1	0–2	0–0	2–1	3–0	1–1	1–1	0–1	1–2	—	0–0	4–0	2–3
Trikala	0–0	0–1	1–1	1–1	0–0	2–1	5–1	1–0	4–0	3–0	1–5	0–0	1–0	2–1	2–0	—	4–0	2–2
Vataniakos	1–3	0–0	0–2	1–1	0–2	3–0	0–2	0–0	3–2	3–0	0–3	0–1	1–1	1–3	0–4	2–1	—	2–0
Zakynthos	1–1	3–0	2–0	1–1	0–2	4–1	3–1	1–1	1–0	3–0	0–2	0–0	2–2	4–3	1–0	0–0	6–0	—

Source: Hellenic Football Federation: 2023-24 Match Schedule (Group 2) (in Greek)
Legend: Blue = home team win; Yellow = draw; Red = away team win.
For upcoming matches, an "a" indicates there is an article about the rivalry between the two participants.

== Group 3 ==
=== Teams ===
Location of teams in Group 3 of 2023-24 Gamma Ethniki

Team	Location	Last season
AER Afantou	Afantou	Dodecanese FCA Champion
Vyzas	Megara	Group 3, 5th
Hellas Syros	Ermoupoli	Cyclades FCA Champion
Erani Filiatra	Filiatra	Messinia FCA Champion
Enosi Ermionida	Kranidi	Group 4, 8th
Thyella Rafina	Rafina (Diastavrosi neighborhood)	Group 5, 3rd
Ialysos	Ialysos	Group 4, 6th
Korinthos	Corinth	Corinthia FCA Champion
Asteras Vari	Vari	East Attica FCA Champion
Marko	Markopoulo	Group 5, 2nd
Messolonghi	Messolonghi	Aetoloacarnania FCA Champion
Mykonos	Mykonos	Group 4, 4th
PAO Varda	Varda	Elis FCA Champion
Panegialios	Aigio	Achaea FCA Champion
Panargiakos	Argos	Group 4, 5th
Panelefsiniakos	Eleusis	Group 3, 3rd
Pyli Kos	Kos	Group 4, 9th
Rodos	Rhodes	Group 4, 2nd

=== Standings ===
Pos	Team	Pld	W	D	L	GF	GA	GD	Pts	Promotion or relegation
1	Panargiakos (C, P)	34	23	7	4	49	13	+36	76	Promotion to Super League 2
2	Korinthos	34	21	7	6	58	29	+29	70	
3	Thyella Rafina	34	19	8	7	52	28	+24	65	
4	Hellas Syros	34	20	3	11	66	30	+36	63	
5	Asteras Vari	34	17	9	8	52	22	+30	60	
6	Marko	34	16	9	9	42	33	+9	57	
7	Rodos	34	15	10	9	51	29	+22	55	
8	Ialysos (R)	34	16	7	11	40	34	+6	55	Relegation to Local FCA championships
9	Panegialios	34	17	4	13	56	43	+13	55	
10	Mykonos	34	15	6	13	51	35	+16	51	
11	AER Afantou	34	13	11	10	42	36	+6	50	
12	PAO Varda (R)	34	13	4	17	33	49	−16	43	Relegation to Local FCA championships
13	Pyli Kos (R)	34	10	7	17	35	48	−13	37	Relegation to Local FCA championships
14	Panelefsiniakos (R)	34	11	2	21	36	66	−30	35	Relegation to Local FCA championships
15	Vyzas (Note: By decision of the Disciplinary Committee, Vyzas Megaron has been suspended from the games against AER Afantou and PAO Varda and a penalty of 10 points deducted.) (R)	34	8	9	17	32	64	−32	23	Relegation to Local FCA championships
16	Erani Filiatra (Note: By decision of the Disciplinary Committee, Erani Filiatra has been suspended from the game against Panelefsiniakos and a penalty of 3 points deducted.) (R)	34	5	11	18	35	54	−19	23	Relegation to Local FCA championships
17	Ermionida (R)	34	5	7	22	24	58	−34	22	Relegation to Local FCA championships
18	Messolonghi (Note: By decision of the Disciplinary Committee, Messolonghi has been suspended from the game against Mykonos and a penalty of 5 points deducted.) (R)	34	0	3	31	16	99	−83	−2	Relegation to Local FCA championships

Source: Hellenic Football Federation: 2023-24 Match Schedule (Group 3) (in Greek)
Rules for classification: 1) points; 2) head-to-head points; 3) head-to-head goal difference; 4) goal difference; 5) goals scored.
(C) Champions; (P) Promoted; (R) Relegated

=== Results ===
Home \ Away	AFA	ASV	ELL	ERA	ERM	IAL	KOR	MAR	MES	MYK	PAN	PAR	PEL	PYL	ROD	VAR	VYZ	THY
AER Afantou	—	1–0	0–1	2–0	1–3	2–2	1–1	1–0	5–1	2–1	3–1	1–0	2–0	0–0	2–1	2–0	3–0 (Note: Vyzas refused to travel for the match against AER Afantou in Rhodes Island, therefore the match was awarded over the team of AER Afantou with a score of 3-0.)	1–1
Asteras Vari	1–0	—	2–0	3–0	3–0	1–3	0–2	0–0	5–1	0–2	1–1	1–2	1–0	3–0	0–1	4–0	6–0	3–1
Hellas Syros	1–0	1–1	—	4–0	2–0	1–2	4–1	2–0	6–0	2–1	3–1	0–1	4–1	3–0	1–1	4–0	4–1	1–1
Erani Filiatra	3–0	1–1	0–2	—	1–1	0–0	0–1	2–2	5–0	2–0	3–4	0–0	0–3 (Note: The match originally finished 1-1.)	4–1	1–1	0–2	0–0	0–1
Ermionida	0–0	0–1	0–2	1–1	—	0–2	0–3	2–3	4–1	0–1	1–0	1–2	0–1	0–0	0–3	1–0	0–1	0–3
Ialysos	1–1	1–0	2–1	2–0	1–1	—	0–1	3–0	3–2	1–0	4–2	1–3	2–1	0–1	1–0	1–0	0–0	1–0
Korinthos	4–0	1–0	1–0	3–0	1–0	1–0	—	1–0	2–0	2–2	1–0	0–1	4–0	2–2	1–1	2–1	2–0	1–1
Marko	1–0	2–2	1–0	1–1	3–1	2–0	1–0	—	3–0	1–0	3–1	0–1	1–0	2–1	0–0	1–0	2–2	1–2
Messolonghi	1–1	0–5	0–4	1–1	1–2	0–3	1–4	1–1	—	1–3	1–4	0–3	1–3	0–2	0–2	1–2	1–2	0–2
Mykonos	1–2	1–1	3–0	4–1	3–1	0–0	2–4	3–1	3–0	—	3–0	0–1	2–3	2–0	0–1	1–1	3–0	0–2
Panegialios	2–0	0–0	2–1	2–1	3–1	1–0	3–1	0–1	4–0	2–0	—	0–1	5–1	2–1	0–3	4–0	2–0	0–1
Panargiakos	0–0	0–0	2–0	1–1	2–0	4–0	1–0	2–1	3–0	0–0	1–0	—	2–0	3–0	2–1	0–1	2–0	1–0
Panelefsiniakos	0–3	0–1	2–5	0–5	1–1	3–1	0–2	0–1	2–0	0–3	2–3	0–3	—	1–0	1–0	2–0	0–1	2–1
Pyli Kos	1–0	1–2	1–2	2–1	3–0	2–0	2–2	2–2	2–1	3–0	1–2	0–0	0–1	—	2–3	1–0	2–0	1–1
Rodos	3–1	0–2	1–0	3–1	4–0	1–1	4–1	1–3	4–0	0–0	1–1	0–0	3–0	2–1	—	0–0	4–0	0–1
PAO Varda	1–1	0–1	0–2	3–0	3–2	2–0	0–0	0–1	1–0	0–3	2–1	0–2	3–2	3–0	1–0	—	3–0 (Note: Match was suspended in 87th minute due to riots from the fans, when the score was 2-1. Awarded 3-0 to PAO Varda.)	0–3
Vyzas	2–2	0–1	0–2	1–0	1–1	1–0	1–2	1–1	1–0	1–2	0–2	3–2	4–4	2–0	2–2	2–4	—	1–1
Thyella Rafina	2–2	0–0	2–1	2–0	1–0	0–2	1–4	1–0	2–0	0–2	1–1	2–1	2–0	2–0	3–0	5–0	4–2	—

Updated to match(es) played on 28 April 2024. Source: Hellenic Football Federation: 2023-24 Match Schedule (Group 3) (in Greek)
Legend: Blue = home team win; Yellow = draw; Red = away team win.
For upcoming matches, an "a" indicates there is an article about the rivalry between the two participants.

== Group 4 ==
=== Teams ===
Location of teams in Group 4 of 2023-24 Gamma Ethniki

Team	Location	Last season
Agia Paraskevi	Agia Paraskevi	Group 5, 6th
Agios Nikolaos	Agios Nikolaos	Group 5, 8th
Almyros Gazi	Gazi	Group 5, 7th
Apollon Smyrnis	Athens (Rizoupoli neighborhood)	SL2 South Group, 3rd
Aris Petroupolis	Petroupoli	Group 5, 9th
Atromitos Piraeus	Piraeus (Kaminia neighborhood)	Piraeus FCA Group 1 Champion
Atsalenios	Heraklion (Atsalenio neighborhood)	Heraklion FCA, Champion
Ethnikos Piraeus	Piraeus	Group 5, 5th
Ellopiakos	Ellopia	Boeotia FCA Champion
Episkopi	Episkopi	SL2 South Group, 13th
Ermis Zoniana	Zoniana	Rethymno FCA Champion
Fostiras	Tavros	Group 5, 4th
Haidari	Haidari	Athens FCA Group 1 Champion
Ilisiakos	Athens (Ilisia neighborhood)	Athens FCA Group 3 Champion
Panionios	Nea Smyrni	Group 4, 3rd
Peramaikos	Perama	Piraeus FCA Group 2 Champion
Proodeftiki	Korydallos	SL2 South Group, 12th
Ypato	Ypato	Group 3, 2nd

=== Standings ===
Pos	Team	Pld	W	D	L	GF	GA	GD	Pts	Promotion or relegation
1	Panionios (C, P)	34	26	6	2	81	22	+59	84	Promotion to Super League 2
2	Ethnikos Piraeus	34	20	12	2	61	19	+42	72	
3	Almyros Gazi (R)	34	17	12	5	59	28	+31	63	Relegation to Local FCA championships
4	Aris Petroupolis (Note: By decision of the Disciplinary Committee of the EPO, Aris Petroupolis has been given a nullity in the game against Almyros Gaziou, a 5-point penalty and a 5-point penalty from the next season. With the decision of the appeals committee, the 5 points penalty from this season were returned to Aris Petroupolis, the nullification remained in the game with Almyros Gaziou.)	34	18	6	10	47	38	+9	60	
5	Ilisiakos	34	16	9	9	43	29	+14	57	
6	Ypato (R)	34	14	9	11	45	34	+11	51	Relegation to Local FCA championships
7	Atsalenios	34	14	8	12	41	33	+8	50	
8	Agios Nikolaos (Note: By decision of the Disciplinary Committee of the EPO, Agios Nikolaos has been suspended from the game against Atromitos Piraeus and a penalty of 3 points deducted.)	34	14	10	10	55	38	+17	49	
9	Haidari	34	13	10	11	39	29	+10	49	
10	Ellopiakos (R)	34	13	9	12	45	43	+2	48	Relegation to Local FCA championships
11	Proodeftiki (R)	34	14	6	14	47	38	+9	48	Relegation to Local FCA championships
12	Apollon Smyrnis (R)	34	10	12	12	39	37	+2	42	Relegation to Local FCA championships
13	Episkopi (R)	34	9	10	15	40	54	−14	37	Relegation to Local FCA championships
14	Ermis Zoniana (R)	34	9	10	15	36	54	−18	37	Relegation to Local FCA championships
15	Peramaikos (R)	34	9	3	22	32	58	−26	30	Relegation to Local FCA championships
16	Fostiras (Note: By decision of the Appeals Committee of the EPO, Fostiras has been suspended from the game with Agia Paraskevi and penalty of deduction of 3 points.) (R)	34	6	13	15	29	42	−13	28	Relegation to Local FCA championships
17	Agia Paraskevi (Note: By decision of the Appeals Committee of the EPO, Agia Paraskevi has been suspended from the game with Fostiras and penalty of deduction of 3 points.) (R)	34	5	5	24	28	82	−54	17	Relegation to Local FCA championships
18	Atromitos Piraeus (R)	34	3	2	29	16	105	−89	11	Relegation to Local FCA championships

Source: Hellenic Football Federation: 2023-24 Match Schedule (Group 4) (in Greek)
Rules for classification: 1) points; 2) head-to-head points; 3) head-to-head goal difference; 4) goal difference; 5) goals scored.
(C) Champions; (P) Promoted; (R) Relegated

=== Results ===
Home \ Away	APA	ANI	ALM	APO	APE	ATP	ATS	ETH	ELO	EPI	ERZ	FOS	HAI	ILI	PIO	PER	PRO	YPA
Agia Paraskevi	—	0–3	1–1	1–0	3–2	3–0	0–1	0–2	0–1	0–0	0–1	1–2	1–1	0–2	0–1	2–4	0–3	1–4
Agios Nikolaos	3–0	—	2–2	3–3	0–0	0–3 (Note: The match originally finished 2-1.)	0–0	1–3	2–0	2–2	0–0	2–1	1–0	2–0	0–0	5–0	2–0	0–1
Almyros Gazi	6–1	2–2	—	2–0	3–0 (Note: The match was suspended at the 39th minute, while the score was 2-1, because a football player from Aris Petroupolis was hit by a fan of Almyros.)	6–0	2–1	2–2	1–0	3–2	2–0	1–0	1–0	2–1	0–1	5–2	0–0	3–1
Apollon Smyrnis	0–0	1–3	1–1	—	0–0	5–0 (Note: Atromitos Piraeus did not compete in the second half in the match against Apollon Smyrnis and the match ended with first half's result 5-0, in favor of Apollon Smyrnis.)	1–1	0–1	0–1	2–0	4–1	0–0	1–0	1–1	1–2	1–0	1–1	3–0
Aris Petroupolis	3–1	2–1	2–0	2–1	—	4–2	1–0	1–2	0–1	1–0	2–1	1–0	1–1	2–1	0–1	1–0	1–2	2–1
Atromitos Piraeus	5–0	0–6	0–0	0–1	0–1	—	0–2	0–3	1–4	0–5	1–1	2–1	0–4	0–5	0–4	1–2	0–2	0–2
Atsalenios	3–3	2–1	1–0	1–1	1–2	6–0	—	0–0	1–1	1–0	1–1	3–0	0–2	0–1	1–2	2–1	2–1	1–0
Ethnikos Piraeus	3–0	1–0	0–2	3–0	1–2	3–0	0–0	—	3–1	1–0	3–0	2–1	3–0	1–1	2–0	3–1	3–0	0–0
Ellopiakos	6–0	1–1	1–2	0–2	0–2	3–0	2–1	0–4	—	3–0	2–0	1–1	1–0	0–1	0–1	2–0	3–1	3–3
Episkopi	2–3	1–3	0–4	3–1	3–2	2–1	2–1	1–4	3–0	—	0–1	2–2	1–1	1–0	1–4	1–0	1–1	1–1
Ermis Zoniana	5–2	0–1	2–2	3–2	1–1	3–0	0–2	1–1	1–1	2–2	—	1–0	1–2	1–1	3–4	1–0	1–0	0–1
Fostiras	0–3 (Note: The match originally finished 0-1.)	0–0	1–1	1–1	0–2	6–0	0–2	1–1	1–1	1–1	1–0	—	1–0	0–0	0–1	1–3	1–0	1–2
Haidari	1–0	2–1	0–1	1–0	1–1	5–0	0–1	1–1	0–0	2–0	2–0	2–2	—	1–2	2–2	2–0	1–0	1–0
Ilisiakos	3–1	1–0	1–0	0–1	2–1	2–0	1–0	1–1	1–1	2–2	0–0	1–1	2–0	—	0–1	2–1	2–1	2–0
Panionios	4–0	4–0	1–1	2–2	3–0	4–0	5–0	1–1	5–0	2–0	7–1	2–0	2–1	3–1	—	4–1	2–1	1–1
Peramaikos	1–0	1–3	1–1	0–0	1–2	1–0	0–2	1–1	2–1	3–0	4–0	0–1	0–1	0–2	0–3	—	0–3	1–2
Proodeftiki	5–0	4–3	1–0	1–2	2–2	3–0	1–0	0–2	2–3	0–0	3–1	2–0	1–1	2–1	1–0	0–1	—	1–2
Ypato	4–0	1–2	0–0	1–0	2–1	6–0	2–1	0–0	1–1	0–1	0–1	1–1	1–1	1–0	1–2	3–0	0–2	—

Source: Hellenic Football Federation: 2023-24 Match Schedule (Group 4) (in Greek)
Legend: Blue = home team win; Yellow = draw; Red = away team win.
For upcoming matches, an "a" indicates there is an article about the rivalry between the two participants.
