= 2021–22 Gamma Ethniki =

Greek 3rd tier football season

Gamma Ethniki
- Season: 2021–22

The 2021–22 Gamma Ethniki was the 39th season since the official establishment of the championship in 1983, and the first after the reestablishment as the 3rd tier of the Greek Football. It started on 23 October 2021. After the finish of the seven groups, the champion of each group qualified for a playoff round, to determine which four teams will be promoted to 2022–23 Super League 2.

81 teams are divided into seven groups according to geographical criteria.

== Group 1 ==
=== Teams ===
Location of teams in Group 1 of 2021-22 Gamma Ethniki

Team	Location	Last season
Thermaikos	Thermi	Group 2, 3rd
Anagennisi Plagia	Plagia	Group 2, 7th
Doxa Drama	Drama	SL2, 10th
Orfeas Xanthi	Xanthi	Group 1, 1st
Nestos Chrysoupoli	Chrysoupoli	Group 1, 7th
Agrotikos Asteras	Evosmos	Group 2, 4th
Alexandroupoli	Alexandroupoli	Group 1, 5th
Ethnikos Sochos	Sochos	Group 1, 10th
Megas Alexandros Orfani	Orfani	Group 1, 8th
Pandramaikos	Drama	Group 1, 4th
Aris Avato	Avato	Group 1, 9th
Apollon Paralimnio	Paralimnio	Group 1, 6th

=== Standings ===
Pos	Team	Pld	W	D	L	GF	GA	GD	Pts	Promotion or relegation
1	Agrotikos Asteras (C, Q)	22	14	6	2	33	8	+25	48	Qualification to Play-offs
2	Pandramaikos	22	10	9	3	38	20	+18	39	
3	Apollon Paralimnio	22	10	5	7	34	22	+12	35	
4	Aris Avato	22	9	5	8	28	21	+7	32	
5	Thermaikos	22	10	2	10	24	25	−1	32	
6	Ethnikos Sochos (Note: Ethnikos Sochos were relegated to FCA championships due to financial problems.) (R)	22	7	10	5	21	13	+8	31	Relegation to FCA championships
7	Doxa Drama	22	6	12	4	25	19	+6	30	
8	Nestos Chrysoupoli	22	7	8	7	25	27	−2	29	
9	Alexandroupoli (Note: Alexandroupoli has 3 points deducted, from the HFF. The game Anagennisi Plagias - Akexandroupoli originally finished 2-4. The game forfeited 3-0, because Alexandroupoli hasn't 5 players under 21 years old at the squad list.)	22	7	5	10	27	38	−11	23	
10	Orfeas Xanthi	22	6	4	12	22	43	−21	22	
11	Megas Alexandros Orfani	22	4	6	12	13	27	−14	18	
12	Anagennisi Plagia (R)	22	5	2	15	17	44	−27	17	Relegation to FCA championships

Source: Hellenic Football Federation (in Greek)
Rules for classification: 1) points; 2) head-to-head points; 3) head-to-head goal difference.
(C) Champions; (Q) Qualified for the phase indicated; (R) Relegated

== Group 2 ==
=== Teams ===
Location of teams in Group 2 of 2021-22 Gamma Ethniki

Team	Location	Last season
Megas Alexandros Trikala	Trikala	Group 2, 8th
Makedonikos	Efkarpia	Group 2, 5th
Kozani	Kozani	Group 3, 5th
Edessaikos	Edessa	Group 2, 9th
Poseidon Nea Michaniona	Michaniona	Group 2, 1st
A.E. Lefkimmi	Lefkimmi	Group 5, 2nd
O.F.A.M.	Ágios Matthaíos	Group 5, 5th
Thyella Sarakinoi	Sarakinoi	Group 2, 2nd
Iraklis Ampelokipi	Ampelokipoi	Group 1, 2nd
AEP Kozani	Kozani	FL North Group, 10th
Anagennisi Giannitsa	Giannitsa	Group 2, 6th
Ktinotrofikos Asteras Kalirachis	Kalirachi	Group 5, 4th

=== Standings ===
Pos	Team	Pld	W	D	L	GF	GA	GD	Pts	Promotion or relegation
1	Makedonikos (Note: Makedonikos lost the game against Lefkimmi, but won the appeal and took part at the promotion play offs. CAS vindicate Lefkimmi, awarding Kozani the league title and 1st place, but EPO decided the promotion of Makedonikos, since they had finished 4th at the promotion play-offs which had already been conducted by the time of the verdict.) (Q)	22	15	4	3	32	10	+22	49	Qualification to Play-offs
2	Kozani (C)	22	14	5	3	35	11	+24	47	
3	AEP Kozani	22	11	4	7	28	18	+10	37	
4	Edessaikos	22	11	3	8	30	25	+5	36	
5	Poseidon Nea Michaniona	22	9	6	7	28	22	+6	33	
6	Thyella Sarakinoi (Note: Thyella Sarakinon merged with Keravnos Angelochoriou (EPSM), on 2 August 2022.)	22	10	3	9	30	31	−1	33	
7	Megas Alexandros Trikala (R)	22	10	3	9	27	22	+5	33	Relegation to FCA championships
8	A.E. Lefkimmi (Note: -A.E. Lefkimmi had 3 points deducted, from the HFF. The game Lefkimmi- Makedonikos originally finished 1-0. The game forfeited to Makedonikos. On 5 July 2022 CAS accepted Lefkimmi's appeal, but the League Table didn't change, because EPO had validated it. Finally, EPO gave back to Lefkimmi the six points, and relegated Megas Alexandros Trikalon.)	22	9	3	10	27	25	+2	30	
9	O.F.A.M. (R)	22	5	7	10	24	38	−14	22	Relegation to FCA championships
10	Anagennisi Giannitsa (R)	22	6	4	12	15	26	−11	22	Relegation to FCA championships
11	Ktinotrofikos Asteras Kalirachis (R)	22	3	5	14	15	38	−23	14	Relegation to FCA championships
12	Iraklis Ampelokipi (R)	22	2	7	13	18	43	−25	13	Relegation to FCA championships

Source: Hellenic Football Federation (in Greek)
Rules for classification: 1) points; 2) head-to-head points; 3) head-to-head goal difference.
(C) Champions; (Q) Qualified for the phase indicated; (R) Relegated

== Group 3 ==
=== Teams ===
Location of teams in Group 3 of 2021-22 Gamma Ethniki

Team	Location	Last season
AO Nea Artaki	Nea Artaki	Group 4, 4th
Iraklis Larissa	Larissa	Group 3, 7th
P.O. Elassona	Elassona	Group 3, 9th
P.O. Fiki	Fiki	Group 3, 8th
Atromitos Palamas	Palamas	Group 3, 6th
AO Ypato	Ypato	Group 4, 3rd
Theseus Agria	Agria	Group 4, 7th
Ethnikos Neo Keramidi	Neo Keramidi	Group 3, 3rd
A.P.O. Atalanti	Atalanti	Group 4, 8th
Amvrysseas	Distomo	Group 4, 5th
Aetos Makrychori	Makrychori	Group 3, 4th
Dimitra Efxeinoupoli	Efxeinoupoli	Group 4, 6h

=== Standings ===
Pos	Team	Pld	W	D	L	GF	GA	GD	Pts	Promotion or relegation
1	Iraklis Larissa (C, Q)	22	16	4	2	35	13	+22	52	Qualification to Play-offs
2	AO Ypato	22	15	5	2	36	10	+26	50	
3	P.O. Elassona	22	10	7	5	21	20	+1	37	
4	Amvrysseas (Note: On 5 August 2022 Amvrysseas Distomou withdrew from Gamma Ethniki due to financial problems and were subsequently relegated to FCA championships.) (R)	22	10	5	7	27	13	+14	35	Relegation to FCA championships
5	Dimitra Efxeinoupoli (Note: Dimitra Efxeinoupoli were relegated to FCA championships due to financial problems.) (R)	22	10	5	7	29	21	+8	35	Relegation to FCA championships
6	P.O. Fiki	22	11	1	10	26	25	+1	34	
7	Ethnikos Neo Keramidi	22	9	6	7	23	15	+8	33	
8	AO Nea Artaki (R)	22	8	8	6	25	13	+12	32	Relegation to FCA championships
9	Atromitos Palamas (R)	22	9	3	10	28	22	+6	30	Relegation to FCA championships
10	Theseus Agria (R)	22	5	5	12	18	29	−11	20	Relegation to FCA championships
11	A.P.O. Atalanti (R)	22	4	0	18	15	50	−35	12	Relegation to FCA championships
12	Aetos Makrychori (R)	22	0	1	21	3	65	−62	1	Relegation to FCA championships

Source: Hellenic Football Federation (in Greek)
Rules for classification: 1) points; 2) head-to-head points; 3) head-to-head goal difference.
(C) Champions; (Q) Qualified for the phase indicated; (R) Relegated

== Group 4 ==
=== Teams ===
Location of teams in Group 4 of 2021-22 Gamma Ethniki

Team	Location	Last season
Ethnikos Skoulikado	Skoulikado	Group 9, 5th
Aias Gastouni	Gastouni	Group 9, 3rd
Diagoras Vrachnaiika	Vrachnaiika	Group 9, 2nd
Tilikratis	Lefkada	Group 5, 3rd
Anagennisi Arta	Arta	Group 5, 7th
Panegialios	Aigio	Group 9, 4th
Nafpaktiakos Asteras	Nafpaktos	Group 9, 7th
A.O. Diavolitsi	Diavolitsi	Group 9, 8th
PAS Acheron Kanallaki	Kanallaki	Group 5, 1st
Panachaiki	Patras	SL2 7th
Amvrakikos Loutro	Loutro	Group 5, 8th
PAO Varda	Varda	Group 9, 6th
Panagriniakos	Agrinio	Group 5, 6th

=== Standings ===
Pos	Team	Pld	W	D	L	GF	GA	GD	Pts	Promotion or relegation
1	Panachaiki (C, Q)	24	18	2	4	53	16	+37	56	Qualification to Play-offs
2	Tilikratis	24	16	4	4	44	17	+27	52	
3	A.O. Diavolitsi	24	14	5	5	40	23	+17	47	
4	PAS Acheron Kanallaki (Note: PAS Acheron Kanallaki were relegated to FCA championships due to financial problems.) (R)	24	11	7	6	33	19	+14	40	Relegation to FCA championships
5	Nafpaktiakos Asteras	24	11	6	7	30	19	+11	39	
6	Aias Gastouni	24	12	3	9	37	30	+7	39	
7	Panagriniakos	24	11	6	7	27	23	+4	39	
8	Diagoras Vrachnaiika (R)	24	10	5	9	31	24	+7	35	Relegation to FCA championships
9	Ethnikos Skoulikado (R)	24	9	5	10	20	26	−6	32	Relegation to FCA championships
10	PAO Varda (R)	24	6	4	14	22	29	−7	22	Relegation to FCA championships
11	Panegialios (R)	24	4	7	13	18	31	−13	19	Relegation to FCA championships
12	Anagennisi Arta (R)	24	6	1	17	19	46	−27	19	Relegation to FCA championships
13	Amvrakikos Loutro (R)	24	0	1	23	3	74	−71	1	Relegation to FCA championships

Source: Hellenic Football Federation (in Greek)
Rules for classification: 1) points; 2) head-to-head points; 3) head-to-head goal difference.
(C) Champions; (Q) Qualified for the phase indicated; (R) Relegated

== Group 5 ==
=== Teams ===
Location of teams in Group 5 of 2021-22 Gamma Ethniki

Team	Location	Last season
Aris Skala	Skala	Group 7, 6th
Enosi Ermionida	Kranidi	Group 7, 4th
Panarkadikos	Tripoli	Group 7, 5th
Agios Ierotheos	Peristeri	Group 7, 3rd
Santorini 2020	Santorini	FL South Group, 5th
Ermis Meligou	Meligou	Group 7, 7th
Mykonos	Mykonos	Group 6, 7th
Ilioupoli	Ilioupoli	Group 6, 2nd
Foinikas Nea Epidavros	Nea Epidavros	Group 7, 8th
Fostiras	Tavros	Group 6, 5th
Charavgiakos	Ilioupoli	Group 6, 3rd

=== Standings ===
Pos	Team	Pld	W	D	L	GF	GA	GD	Pts	Promotion or relegation
1	Ilioupoli (C, Q)	20	15	3	2	41	11	+30	48	Qualification to Play-offs
2	Fostiras	20	12	3	5	29	16	+13	39	
3	Santorini 2020 (Note: Santorini 2020 were relegated to FCA championships due to financial problems.) (R)	20	10	6	4	30	9	+21	36	Relegation to FCA championships
4	Mykonos	20	9	3	8	30	27	+3	30	
5	Foinikas Nea Epidavros	19	9	1	9	23	26	−3	28	
6	Agios Ierotheos	20	8	3	9	21	26	−5	27	
7	Enosi Ermionida	20	8	3	9	19	25	−6	27	
8	Charavgiakos (R)	20	7	4	9	19	27	−8	25	Relegation to FCA championships
9	Panarkadikos (R)	20	7	2	11	27	27	0	23	Relegation to FCA championships
10	Ermis Meligou (R)	20	5	5	10	16	29	−13	20	Relegation to FCA championships
11	Aris Skala (R)	20	1	5	14	10	41	−31	8	Relegation to FCA championships

Source: Hellenic Football Federation (in Greek)
Rules for classification: 1) points; 2) head-to-head points; 3) head-to-head goal difference.
(C) Champions; (Q) Qualified for the phase indicated; (R) Relegated

== Group 6 ==
=== Teams ===
Location of teams in Group 6 of 2021-22 Gamma Ethniki

Team	Location	Last season
Aiolikos	Lesvos	Group 8, 2nd
Keratsini	Keratsini	Group 8, 8th
Panelefsiniakos	Eleusis	Group 8, 7th
Ethnikos Piraeus	Piraeus	Group 6, 6th
Aittitos Spata	Spata	Group 6, 8th
Kyanos Asteras Vari	Vari	Group 8, 6th
Thyella Rafina	Rafina (Diastavrosi neighborhood)	Group 8, 1st
Proodeftiki	Moschato	Group 6, 4th
Aias Salamina	Salamina	Group 8, 5th
A.O. Pyli Kos	Kos	Group 8, 3rd
A.O. Karavas	Piraeus (Karavas neighborhood)	Group 8, 4th

=== Standings ===
Pos	Team	Pld	W	D	L	GF	GA	GD	Pts	Promotion or relegation
1	Proodeftiki (C, Q)	20	12	7	1	32	10	+22	43	Qualification to play-offs
2	Ethnikos Piraeus	20	13	3	4	36	19	+17	42	
3	Panelefsiniakos	20	12	5	3	37	16	+21	41	
4	Thyella Rafina	20	8	6	6	21	18	+3	30	
5	Aiolikos	20	8	4	8	20	22	−2	28	
6	A.O. Pyli Kos	20	7	6	7	20	25	−5	27	
7	Keratsini	20	7	3	10	16	26	−10	24	
8	Kyanos Asteras Vari (R)	20	7	3	10	27	30	−3	24	Relegation to FCA championships
9	Aias Salamina (R)	20	5	5	10	22	28	−6	20	Relegation to FCA championships
10	A.O. Karavas (R)	20	2	8	10	15	28	−13	14	Relegation to FCA championships
11	Aittitos Spata (R)	20	3	2	15	12	36	−24	11	Relegation to FCA championships

Source: Hellenic Football Federation (in Greek)
Rules for classification: 1) points; 2) head-to-head points; 3) head-to-head goal difference.
(C) Champions; (Q) Qualified for the phase indicated; (R) Relegated

== Group 7 ==
=== Teams ===
Location of teams in Group 7 of 2021-22 Gamma Ethniki

Team	Location	Last season
Panionios	Nea Smyrni	Group 6, 1st
P.A.O. Rouf	Rouf	Group 7, 2nd
A.E. Neapoli	Neapoli	Group 10, 10th
Almyros Gazi	Gazi	Group 10, 4th
AO Agios Nikolaos	Agios Nikolaos	Group 10, 2nd
Aris Souda	Souda	Group 10, 7th
AO Poros	Heraklion (Poros neighborhood)	Group 10, 8th
Atsalenios	Heraklion (Atsalenio neighborhood)	Group 10, 3rd
Anagennisi Ierapetra	Ierapetra	Group 10, 9th
Giouchtas	Archanes	Group 10, 6th

=== Standings ===
Pos	Team	Pld	W	D	L	GF	GA	GD	Pts	Promotion or relegation
1	P.A.O. Rouf (C, Q)	18	13	4	1	37	16	+21	43	Qualification to play-offs
2	Panionios	18	12	4	2	33	12	+21	40	
3	AO Poros	18	8	6	4	32	20	+12	30	
4	AO Agios Nikolaos	18	9	3	6	28	21	+7	30	
5	Giouchtas	18	7	6	5	19	16	+3	27	
6	Almyros Gazi	18	7	5	6	29	17	+12	26	
7	Atsalenios (R)	18	8	2	8	28	25	+3	26	Relegation to FCA championships
8	Aris Souda (R)	18	2	4	12	12	26	−14	10	Relegation to FCA championships
9	Anagennisi Ierapetra (R)	18	3	1	14	12	53	−41	10	Relegation to FCA championships
10	A.E. Neapoli (R)	18	2	3	13	10	34	−24	9	Relegation to FCA championships

Source: Hellenic Football Federation (in Greek)
Rules for classification: 1) points; 2) head-to-head points; 3) head-to-head goal difference.
(C) Champions; (Q) Qualified for the phase indicated; (R) Relegated

== Play-off round ==
The seven champions from Regular season met once (6 matches per team) for four places in 2022–23 Super League Greece 2. It started on 15 May 2022.

Pos	Team	Pld	W	D	L	GF	GA	GD	Pts	Promotion or qualification	PAC	PRO	AGR	MAK	ILI	PAO	ILA
1	Panachaiki (P)	6	5	0	1	11	5	+6	15	Promotion to Super League 2	—	—	—	—	1–0	2–1	3–0
2	Proodeftiki (P)	6	3	1	2	8	3	+5	10	Promotion to Super League 2	2–1	—	—	0–0	—	—	4–0
3	Agrotikos Asteras (Note: Agrotikos Asteras was not promoted to Super League 2 because of financial problems, therefore Ilioupoli was promoted instead.)	6	3	1	2	9	6	+3	10		2–3	1–0	—	—	—	2–0	—
4	Makedonikos (P)	6	2	3	1	5	4	+1	9	Promotion to Super League 2	0–1	—	1–0	—	2–1	—	—
5	Ilioupoli (P)	6	2	1	3	8	7	+1	7	Promotion to Super League 2	—	1–0	1–1	—	—	—	5–2
6	P.A.O. Rouf (Note: PAO Rouf was promoted to Super League 2 after Ergotelis F.C. withdrew from the league.) (P)	6	2	1	3	7	9	−2	7	Promotion to Super League 2	—	0–2	—	2–2	1–0	—	—
7	Iraklis Larissa (Note: Iraklis Larissa was promoted to Super League 2 after Xanthi F.C. withdrew from the league.) (P)	6	0	1	5	4	18	−14	1	Promotion to Super League 2	—	—	1–3	0–0	—	1–3	—

Source: Hellenic Football Federation (in Greek)
Legend: Blue = home team win; Yellow = draw; Red = away team win.
Rules for classification: 1) Points; 2) Head-to-head points (Regular season and play-off); 3) Head-to-head goal difference (Regular season and play-off); 4) Regular season position.
(P) Promoted
