= Milan Lalkovič =

Slovak footballer

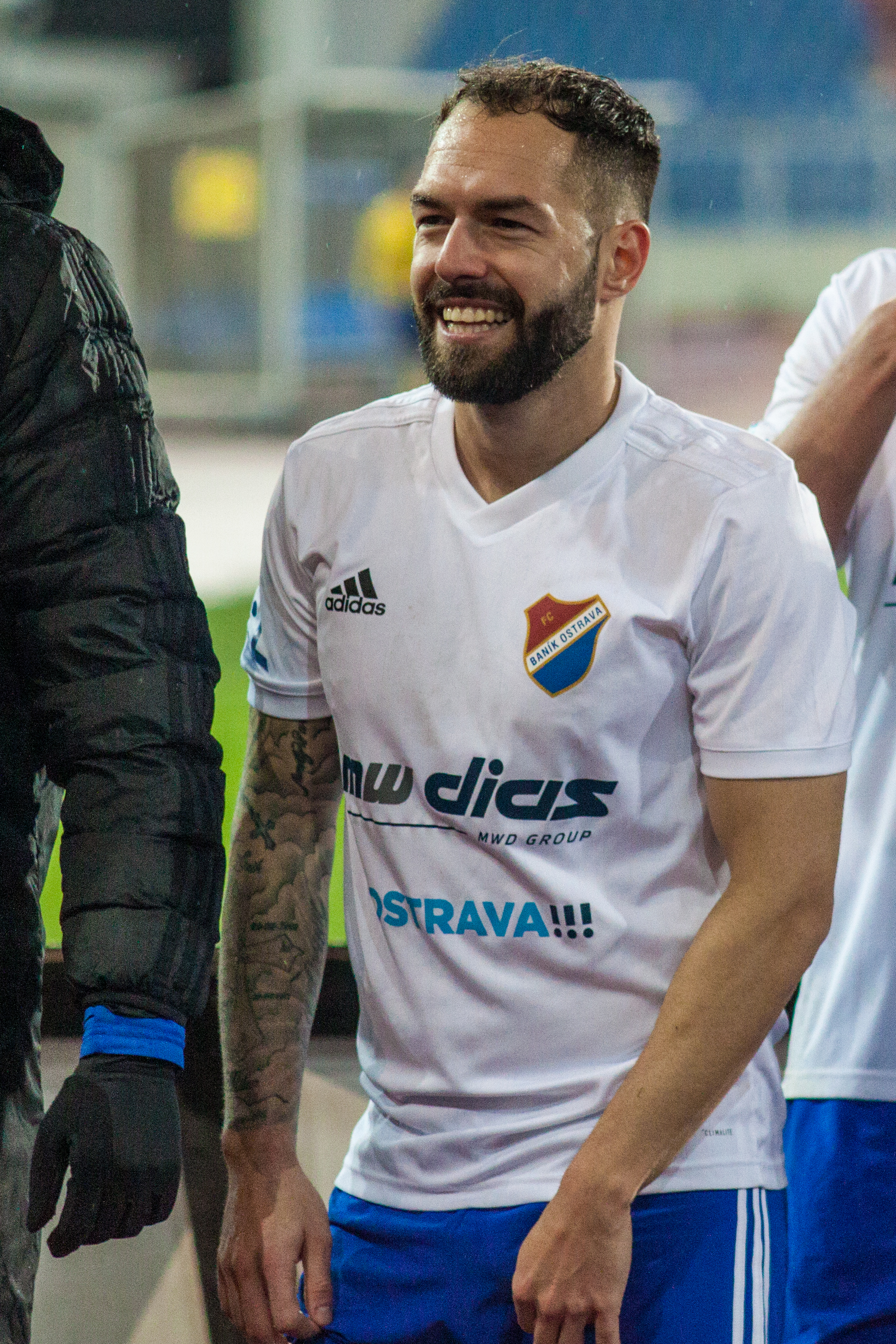
- Lalkovič with Baník Ostrava in 2019

Personal information
- Date of birth: 9 December 1992 (age 33)
- Place of birth: Košice, Czechoslovakia
- Height: 1.74 m (5 ft 9 in)
- Position: Winger

Team information
- Current team: Chorley
- Number: 22

Youth career
- Košice-Barca
- 1998–2007: MFK Košice
- 2007–2010: Chelsea

Senior career*
Years	Team	Apps	(Gls)
2010–2014	Chelsea	0	(0)
2011	→ Doncaster Rovers (loan)	6	(0)
2012	→ ADO Den Haag (loan)	2	(0)
2012–2013	→ Vitória de Guimarães (loan)	8	(0)
2013–2014	→ Walsall (loan)	38	(6)
2014–2015	Mladá Boleslav	6	(0)
2015	Barnsley	17	(0)
2015–2016	Walsall	40	(7)
2016–2018	Portsmouth	14	(1)
2017	→ Ross County (loan)	6	(0)
2018–2019	Sigma Olomouc	17	(2)
2019–2021	Baník Ostrava	13	(0)
2021	Příbram	8	(0)
2021–2022	Boston United	7	(0)
2022	Makedonikos		
2022–2023	AO Chaniotis		
2023	Thermaikos		
2023–2024	Pyli Kos		
2024	PAS Korinthos		
2024	Stalybridge Celtic	6	(1)
2024–2025	Rushall Olympic	10	(0)
2025–	Chorley	35	(3)

International career^{‡}
2007–2009	Slovakia U17	9	(2)
2009–2010	Slovakia U19	3	(0)
2011–2014	Slovakia U21	16	(1)
- * Club domestic league appearances and goals as of 11:29, 26 April 2026 (UTC) ‡ National team caps and goals as of 18 July 2015

Milan Lalkovič (born 9 December 1992) is a Slovak professional footballer who plays as a winger for National League North club Chorley.

== Club career ==
=== Early career ===
Born in Košice, Lalkovič spent his early career with Košice-Barca and MFK Košice before signing for English club Chelsea in 2007. He joined Doncaster Rovers in August 2010; Lalkovič made a total of six appearances for Doncaster before returning to Chelsea.

Lalkovič signed a season-long loan deal with Dutch club ADO Den Haag in August 2011, and a season-long loan deal with Portuguese club Vitória de Guimarães in July 2012. On 4 January 2013 Lalkovič was recalled by Chelsea as he was struggling to find regular playing time.

On 15 July 2013, Lalkovič signed for Walsall on a six-month loan deal. During this period, Lalkovič scored 4 times in 24 appearances. On 6 January 2014, Lalkovič extended his loan with Walsall until the end of the season. On 23 May 2014, Chelsea released Lalkovič and made him available for free transfer.

On 25 July 2014, Lalkovič signed a deal with Czech FK Mladá Boleslav. Following the termination of his deal with the side, he completed a free transfer to League One side Barnsley on 8 January 2015, signing an eighteen-month contract. Lalkovič made his Barnsley début coming off the bench in a 2–0 victory against Yeovil Town. Lalkovič made seventeen appearances in total for the Tykes but was permitted to conclude his contract early at the end of the season.

=== Walsall ===
Lalkovič rejoined Walsall on 16 July 2015, signing a one–year deal with the Saddlers. He scored his first goal in his second spell at Walsall in a League Cup tie against Brighton & Hove Albion.

=== Portsmouth ===
On 28 June 2016, Lalkovič signed a two-year deal with Portsmouth for an undisclosed fee after failing to agree a new contract with Walsall. He scored his first goal for the club in a 5–1 win over Barnet on 24 September 2016.

On 20 January 2017, Lalkovič joined Scottish Premiership side Ross County on loan for the remainder of the 2016–17 campaign.

On transfer deadline day, Milan had his contract cancelled 6 months early by mutual consent.

=== Czech First League ===
On 18 October 2018, Lalkovič joined Czech First League side Sigma Olomouc on a short-term deal until the end of the season. After the season, he left Sigma Olomouc for FC Baník Ostrava.

On 2 February 2021, Lalkovič joined fellow Czech First League side Příbram on a short-term deal until the end of the season.

=== Return to England ===
On 2 November 2021, Lalkovic returned to England, after signing for National League North side Boston United.

In October 2024, following two years in Greece, Lalkovič once again returned to England, joining Northern Premier League Division One West club Stalybridge Celtic. The following month, he joined National League North side Rushall Olympic. In March 2025, Lalkovic joined fellow National League North side Chorley on a non-contract basis.

== Career statistics ==
As of match played 18 January 2025

Appearances by cub, season and competition
Club	Season	League			FA Cup		League Cup		Other		Total	
Club	Season	Division	Apps	Goals	Apps	Goals	Apps	Goals	Apps	Goals	Apps	Goals
Chelsea	2011–12	Premier League	0	0	0	0	0	0	0	0	0	0
Chelsea	2012–13	Premier League	0	0	0	0	0	0	0	0	0	0
Chelsea	2013–14	Premier League	0	0	0	0	0	0	0	0	0	0
Chelsea	Total		0	0	0	0	0	0	0	0	0	0
Doncaster Rovers (loan)	2011–12	Championship	6	0	0	0	0	0	—		6	0
ADO Den Haag (loan)	2011–12	Eredivisie	2	0	0	0	—		—		2	0
Vitória de Guimarães (loan)	2012–13	Primeira Liga	8	0	1	0	1	0	—		10	0
Walsall (loan)	2013–14	League One	38	6	2	0	1	0	1 (Note: Appearance(s) in Football League Trophy)	0	42	6
Mladá Boleslav	2014–15	Czech First League	6	0	2	0	—		0	0	8	0
Barnsley	2014–15	League One	17	0	0	0	0	0	0	0	17	0
Walsall	2015–16	League One	40	5	1	0	3	1	3 (Note: One appearance in Football League Trophy and two appearances in Football League One play-offs)	0	47	6
Portsmouth	2016–17	League Two	13	1	1	0	0	0	2	0	16	1
Portsmouth	2017–18	League One	1	0	0	0	0	0	1	0	2	0
Portsmouth	Total		14	1	1	0	0	0	3	0	18	1
Ross County (loan)	2016–17	Scottish Premiership	6	0	2	0	0	0	—		8	0
Sigma Olomouc	2018–19	Czech First League	17	2	0	0	0	0	1	0	8	0
Baník Ostrava	2019–20	Czech First League	11	0	1	0	0	0	—		12	0
Baník Ostrava	2020–21	Czech First League	2	0	0	0	0	0	—		2	0
Baník Ostrava	Total		13	0	1	0	0	0	0	0	14	0
Příbram	2020–21	Czech First League	8	0	0	0	0	0	—		8	0
Boston United	2021–22	National League North	7	0	0	0	—		2 (Note: Appearance(s) in FA Trophy)	0	9	0
Makedonikos	2021–22	Gamma Ethniki Grp 2	No data currently available									
Makedonikos	2022–23	Super League 2	No data currently available									
Chaniotis	2022–23	Gamma Ethniki Grp 2	No data currently available									
Thermaikos	2022–23	Gamma Ethniki Grp 1	No data currently available									
Pyliou	2023–24	3rd National Grp 4	No data currently available									
Korinthos	2023–24	Gamma Ethniki Grp 3	No data currently available									
Stalybridge Celtic	2024–25	NPL Division One West	6	1	0	0	—		0	0	6	1
Rushall Olympic	2024–25	National League North	10	0	—		—		4 (Note: Two appearances in FA Trophy, one appearance in Staffordshire Senior Cup and one appearance in Walsall Senior Cup)	2	14	2
Career total			197	15	10	0	5	1	14	2	226	18

== Honours ==
Vitória de Guimarães

- Taça de Portugal: 2012–13

Portsmouth

- EFL League Two: 2016–17

Makedonikos

- Gamma Ethniki: 2021–22 runner-up, promotion via play-offs
