= P.S. Ethnikos Neo Keramidi =

Ethnikos Neo Keramidi
- Full name: Ethnikos Proodeftikos Sillogos Neo Keramidi Pieria
- Founded: 1951; 75 years ago
- Ground: Neo Keramidi Municipal Stadium
- Chairman: Stelios Kalaitzidis
- Manager: Konstantinos Velitzelos
- League: Gamma Ethniki
- 2025–26: Gamma Ethniki (Group 2), 2nd
- Website: neofc.gr
Home colours	Away colours

P.S. Ethnikos Neo Keramidi (Greek: Π.Σ. Εθνικός Νέου Κεραμιδίου, Εθνικός Προοδευτικός Σύλλογος Νέου Κεραμιδίου) is a Greek professional football club, based in Neo Keramidi, Pieria, Greece. It was founded in 1951. The club's home ground is the Neo Keramidi Stadium, but for the participation in Super League 2, Ethnikos uses the Katerini Stadium.

== History ==
Ethnikos Neo Keramidi made its first appearance in a national category during the 2020–21 season, securing a 3rd-place finish in its group with 25 points. The team played only the first round of matches due to disruptions caused by the COVID-19 pandemic. The following season proved challenging, with the team barely avoiding relegation by a single point. In subsequent seasons, Ethnikos Neo Keramidi established itself as a formidable force in the Gamma Ethniki, boasting a strong squad. In February 2023, the club appointed Vangelis Moras, a former international footballer and coach of Apollon Larissa and P.O. Elassona, as its head coach.

The 2023–24 season marked the most successful in the club's history. Ethnikos Neo Keramidi won their Gamma Ethniki group and achieved automatic promotion to Super League Greece 2, the second division of Greek football.

In its inaugural season in the professional divisions during the 2024–25 campaign, Ethnikos endured a dismal run, finishing in last place in both the regular season and the play-outs, inevitably returning to Gamma Ethniki.

In the following season (2025–26), Ethnikos enjoyed an excellent run in Group 2 of Gamma Ethniki, finishing in 2nd place behind Apollon Kalamarias and 16 points ahead of Veria. As the best runner-up among the Northern groups, the team qualified for the promotion play-offs seeking an immediate return to Super League 2. However, despite a competitive performance, Ethnikos failed to secure promotion and remained in Gamma Ethniki.

== Honours ==
=== National ===
- Gamma Ethniki (1):
  - 2023–24

=== Regional ===
- Pieria FCA First Division (1):
  - 2019–20
- Pieria FCA Cup (1):
  - 2023–24

== Season by season ==
Season	Tier	Division	Place	Notes
2020–21	3	Gamma Ethniki	3rd	
2021–22	3	Gamma Ethniki	7th	
2022–23	3	Gamma Ethniki	2nd	
2023–24	3	Gamma Ethniki	1st	Champions, Promoted
2024–25	2	Super League Greece 2	10th	Relegated
2025–26	3	Gamma Ethniki	2nd	
