= Agia Varvara, Pieria =

Agia Varvara Αγία Βαρβάρα
- Settlement
- Location within Greece
- Coordinates: 40°16.35′N 22°27.95′E
- Country: Greece
- Administrative region: Central Macedonia
- Regional unit: Pieria
- Municipality: Katerini
- Municipal unit: Katerini
- Community: Svoronos
- Elevation: 50 m (160 ft)

Population (2021)
  - Total: 62
- Time zone: UTC+2 (EET)
  - Summer (DST): UTC+3 (EEST)
- Postal code: 601 00
- Area code: +30-2351
- Vehicle registration: KN

Agia Varvara (Greek: Αγία Βαρβάρα) is a village of the Katerini municipality. Before the 1997 local government reform it was part of the community of Svoronos. The 2021 census recorded 62 inhabitants in the village. Agia Varvara is a part of the municipal community of Svoronos.

== See also ==
- List of settlements in the Pieria regional unit
