= Doxa Drama F.C. =

Doxa Drama
- Full name: Γυμναστικός Σύλλογος Δόξα Δράμας (Gymnastics Society Doxa Drama)
- Nickname: Μαυραετοί (Black Eagles)
- Founded: 1918; 108 years ago, as Peleus
- Ground: Doxa Drama Stadium
- Capacity: 10,000
- Chairman: Eleftherios Kallinikidis
- Manager: Konstantinos Nebegleras
- League: Gamma Ethniki
- 2025–26: Gamma Ethniki (Group 1), 3rd
- Website: https://doxadramas1918.gr
Home colours	Away colours

Doxa Drama Football Club (Greek: Δόξα Δράμας) is a Greek professional football club based in the city of Drama, Macedonia, Greece. Founded in 1918, the club's home ground since then has been Doxa Drama Stadium.

Doxa Drama is considered one of the most historic and major teams of Greece and was one of the founding members of the Super League, the first tier of Greek football.

== History ==
During World War I, near the city of Drama, Macedonia, a team of English soldiers who played football regularly in their camp inspired the local Greek population to create the first football club in the region. Founded as Peleus in 1918, the team was renamed Doxa (Glory) in 1919.

Initially, the team colors were black and white with the logo of a black clover. After the war, the team's logo was permanently changed to a black eagle, while the team colours of black and white remain until today.

The first formal match of Doxa was against AO Kavala, the team of neighbouring city of Kavala. In that first game, Doxa lost 3–0. Doxa Drama is one of the founders of the Greek League Alpha Ethniki, the highest tier of Greek club football. Doxa reached the final of the Greek football Cup in 1953–54, 1957–58, and 1958–59, but lost all three finals from Olympiacos.

Doxa Drama participated in Alpha Ethniki for 21 seasons. Financial and administrative turmoil, however, led to the club being relegated to Greece's amateur division, Delta Ethniki. In 2008–09, Doxa had a strong year in the Third Division and clinched the Gamma Ethniki North title with two games to spare. Doxa returned to Beta Ethniki after 11 years for the 2009–10 season, where the team finished 14th in the regular season and 13th after the Beta Ethniki play-outs.

Financial problems continued for Doxa Drama which was never able to return to Alpha Ethniki (Nowadays named Super League). In season 2018–19, it plays in the Greek Football League (2nd level of Greek Football).

In February 2019, a group of Russian, and Lithuanian investors based in Delaware purchased 15% of the team (Minority stake).

During the 2020–21 season, Doxa was relegated to the Gamma Ethniki after four years following the rejection of its participation certificate by the Professional Sports Committee.

During the 2021–22 season, Doxa recorded a mediocre to decent campaign, securing division survival on the final matchday following a 2–2 draw against Ethnikos Sochou. The following season proved far more comfortable, with the club finishing in 4th place without facing relegation threats, despite ongoing administrative difficulties surrounding the team.

However, this stable run ended in the 2023–24 season—the third consecutive year in the third tier—which marked one of the darkest chapters in the club's history. Following a disappointing performance, Doxa finished in 12th place and was relegated to the regional Drama FCA league for the first time after 65 consecutive years in the national divisions.

During the 2024–25 season, Doxa won the regional championship undefeated, winning all 26 league matches to earn qualification for the 2025 Greek Football Clubs Association Winners' Championship special promotion tournament, through which the club secured promotion back to the national divisions. Additionally, Doxa completed a domestic double that same season by winning the Drama FCA Cup.

During the 2025–26 season, Doxa returned to the Gamma Ethniki, delivering a strong campaign to finish in 3rd place in Group 1 with 52 points.

== Stadium ==
Doxa Drama's stadium is a multipurpose stadium used primarily for football matches in Drama. It is the physical seat of Doxa Drama with a capacity of 10,000 spectators. In its early years, the club was trying to find a place to be able to have a stable seat. They did it in 1953, when Athanasios Doubesis, with his official donation, gave an area to build the stadium. After World War II, and after rebuilding the stadium, it was originally only the western platform. In the 80s, the northern part of the stadium was built, while in the same decade attempted to build the left-hand side, which did not start, but was completed in 2011, when the works on the stadium were over.

== Crest and colours ==
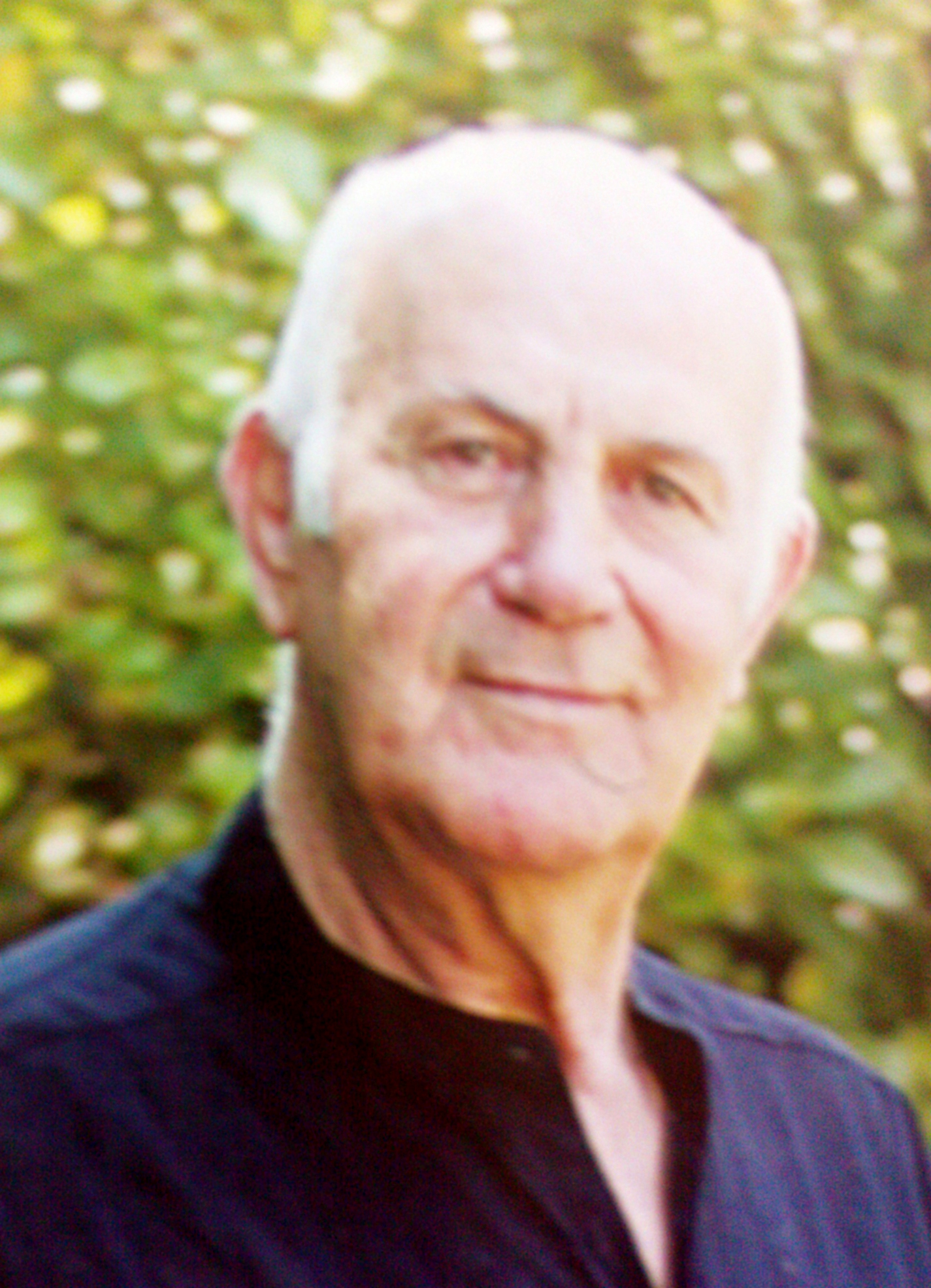
Takis Loukanidis started his career in Doxa Drama.

=== Crest ===
The primary crest of the club was the clover. Each leaf of the clover was written a letter from the GSD (initially the words "Gymnastic Association of Drama"). The crest changed in the 1950s after many fans' reactions, removing the preference for black clover and putting the black eagle in its position, which the team has today.

=== Colours ===
The colours of the club are black and white. The black clothing honors those Doxa Drama's footballers who were killed during the Greek-Bulgarian War. Doxa's Takis Loukanidis had said:

I do not know who those footballers were, but we honored the lads, feeling great pride wearing the black!

== Rivalries ==
Matches between Doxa Drama and Kavala draw significant interest, carrying the character of a local derby in a longstanding regional rivalry.

== League participations ==
(since 1959)
Tier	Season	Participations
1st		25
2nd		27
3rd		13
4th	(*not exist from 2013)	4
Local	(*include 2024–25)	1

== Seasons in the 21st century (details) ==
Season	Category	Position	Cup
2000–01	Delta Ethniki (4th division)	3rd	
2001–02	Delta Ethniki (4th division)	6th	
2002–03	Delta Ethniki (4th division)	1st	
2003–04	Gamma Ethniki (3rd division)	10th	1R
2004–05	Gamma Ethniki (3rd division)	8th	1R
2005–06	Gamma Ethniki (3rd division)	6th	2R
2006–07	Gamma Ethniki (3rd division)	11th	1R
2007–08	Gamma Ethniki (3rd division)	17th	1R
2008–09	Gamma Ethniki (3rd division)	1st	2R
2009–10	Beta Ethniki (2nd division)	14th	2R
2010–11	Football League 2 (3rd division)	5th	2R
2011–12	Super League (1st division)	18th	R16
2012–13	Football League (2nd Division)	9th	1R
2013–14	Football League (2nd division)	10th	1R
2014–15	Gamma Ethniki (3rd division)	4th	
2015–16	Gamma Ethniki (3rd division)	3rd	
2016–17	Gamma Ethniki (3rd division)	2nd	
2017–18	Football League (2nd division)	5th	
2018–19	Gamma Ethniki (2nd division)	8th	QR
2019–20	Super League 2 (2nd Division)	10th	4R
2020–21	Super League 2 (2nd Division)	10th	Cancelled
2021–22	Gamma Ethniki (3rd Division)	7th	
2022–23	Gamma Ethniki (3rd Division)	4th	
2023–24	Gamma Ethniki (3rd Division)	12th	
2024–25	Drama FCA First Division	1st	
2025–26	Gamma Ethniki (3rd Division)	3rd	
2026–27	Gamma Ethniki (3rd Division)		

Key: QR = Qualifying Round, 1R = First Round, 2R = Second Round, 3R = Third Round, 4R = Fourth Round, 5R = Fifth Round, GS = Group Stage, R16 = Round of 16, QF = Quarter-finals, SF = Semi-finals.

== Notable managers ==
- (Greece) Kostas Vasilakakis (1981–95)
- (Greece) Michalis Grigoriou
- (Greece) Apostolos Charalampidis
- (Greece) Makis Katsavakis

== Notable players ==
- (Greece) Paraskevas Antzas
- (Greece) Georgios Georgiadis
- (Greece) Takis Loukanidis
- (Greece) Theodoros Pachatouridis
- (Greece) Kyriakos Tohouroglou

== Honours ==
=== Domestic ===
==== Leagues ====
- Football League (Second Division)
  - Winners (3): 1962–63, 1978–79, 1987–88
- Gamma Ethniki (Third Division)
  - Winners (1): 2008–09
- Delta Ethniki (Fourth Division)
  - Winners (1): 2002–03
- Drama FCA First Division
  - Winners (1): 2024–25
- East Macedonia FCA First Division
  - Winners (9): 1937–38, 1948–49, 1950–51, 1953–54, 1954–55, 1955–56, 1956–57, 1957–58, 1958–59

==== Cups ====
- Greek Football Cup
  - Runners-Up (3): 1953–54, 1957–58, 1958–59
- Drama FCA Cup Winners
  - Winners (4): 2000–01, 2001–02, 2015–16, 2024–25
- Drama FCA Super Cup Winners
  - Winners (1): 2015–16

== Bibliography ==
- «ΔΟΞΑ ΔΡΑΜΑΣ 1918–1965 ΛΕΥΚΩΜΑ», Βασίλης Τσιαμπούσης, 1996, εκδόσεις Δ.Ε.Κ.ΠΟ.Τ.Α. Δήμου Δράμας
- Γράμμα στη Δόξα, έκδοση 1918–2008 ενενήντα χρόνια Δόξα Δράμας, Δράμα, 2009.
- «Δόξα Δράμας 1980–1995 τα δεκαπέντε χρόνια της Δόξας στην Α΄ Επαγγελματική κατηγορία», Θεόδωρος Μπουδακίδης, Δράμα, 2018.
