= Moussa Pokong =

Cameroonian footballer

Personal information
- Full name: Étienne Le Doux Moussa Pokong
- Date of birth: 13 August 1987 (age 39)
- Place of birth: Garoua, Cameroon
- Height: 1.70 m (5 ft 7 in)
- Position: Forward

Team information
- Current team: AO Poros

Youth career
- Roumdé Adjia de Garoua

Senior career*
Years	Team	Apps	(Gls)
2003–2005	FS d'Akonolinga	0	(0)
2006–2009	Club Africain	0	(1)
2009–2010	Al-Khor SC	3	(0)
2010–2012	Monastir	2	(0)
2012	Iraklis Psachna	30	(6)
2014–2015	Tyrnavos	35	(7)
2016–2017	Kissamikos	21	(2)
2017–2019	Makedonikos		
2019–	AO Poros		
- * Club domestic league appearances and goals

Étienne Le Doux Moussa Pokong (born 13 August 1987) is a Cameroonian footballer who plays as a forward for AO Poros.

== Club career ==
Pokong was born in Garoua. He transferred to Club Africain in January 2006, he came from FS d'Akonolinga. After three years resign with the Tunisian club Club Africain to join Al-Khor Sports Club.

On 20 August 2019, Pokong joined Greece club AO Poros.

== International career ==
Pokong earned his first call-up for the Cameroon national team on 14 October 2007 for a qualification game against Morocco.
