= Prosilio, Pieria =

Prosilio Προσήλιο
- Settlement
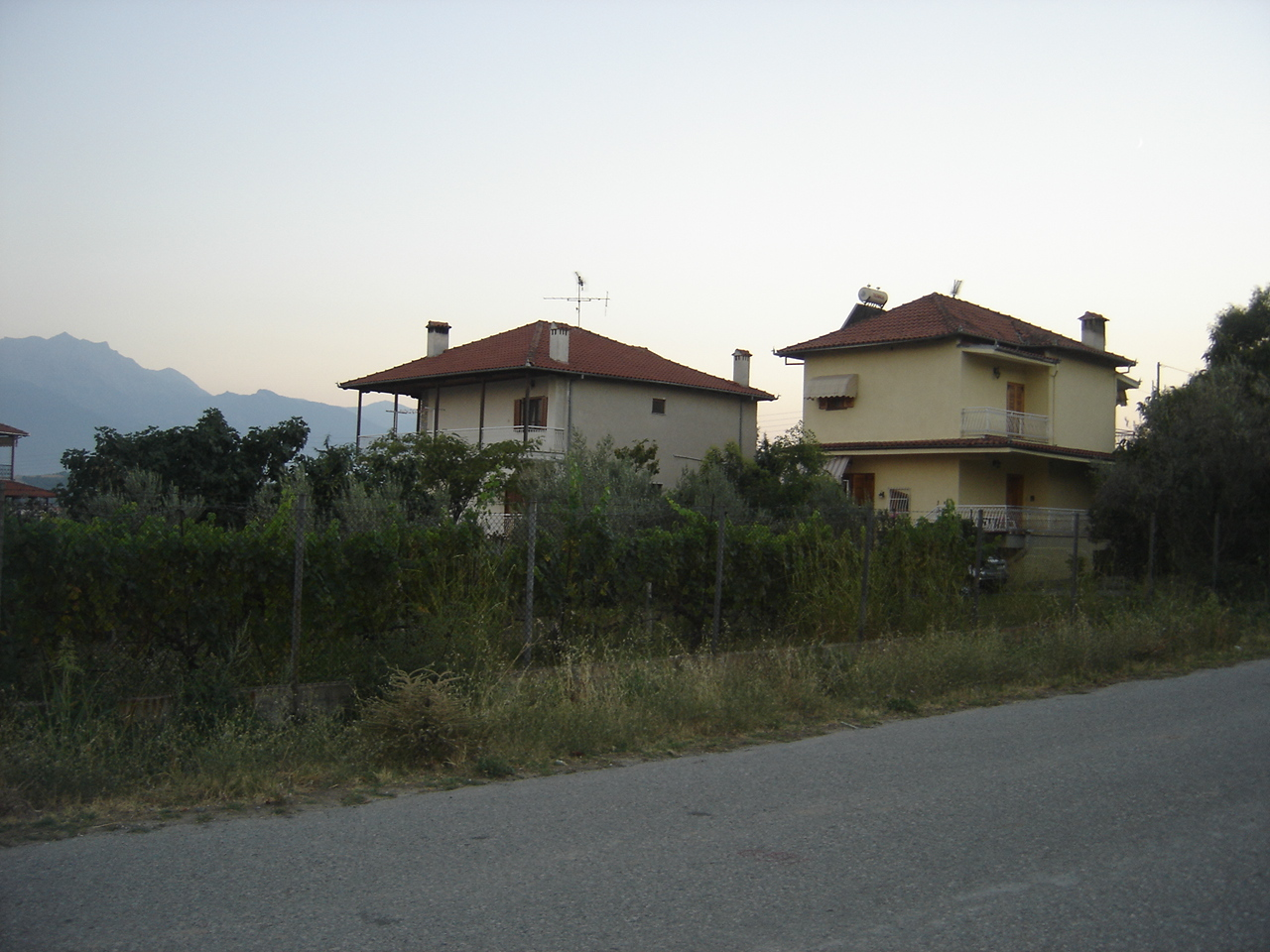
- Houses in Prosilio

- Location within Greece
- Country: Greece
- Administrative region: Central Macedonia
- Regional unit: Pieria
- Municipality: Katerini
- Municipal unit: Katerini
- Community: Svoronos
- Elevation: 55 m (180 ft)

Population (2021)
  - Total: 158
- Time zone: UTC+2 (EET)
  - Summer (DST): UTC+3 (EEST)
- Postal code: 601 00
- Area code: +30-2351
- Vehicle registration: KN

Prosilio (Greek: Προσήλιο) is a settlement, suburb, of the Katerini municipality. Before the 1997 local government reform it was part of the community of Svoronos. The 2021 census recorded 158 inhabitants in the settlement.

In infrastructure terms Prosilio has wooded hill and tress, the Orthodox Church of Agia Sofia and the Ecclesiastical Elderly Care Home of the Metropolis of Kitros, Katerini and Platamon where nearby there is the Ecclesiastical Guest House that once housed the Second Chance Seminary School of Katerini for two years ecclesiastical lifelong learning education. All the state services, such as school, medical care centre, of Svoronos service the citizens of Prosilio.

== See also ==
- List of settlements in the Pieria regional unit
