= A.O. Pyli Kos F.C. =

Association football club in Greece

Pyli Kos
- Full name: Athlitikos Omilos Pyli Kos
- Founded: 1980; 46 years ago
- Ground: Pyli Municipal Stadium
- Chairman: Petros Kefalianos
- Manager: Stamatis Togrou
- League: Dodecanese FCA Second Division
- 2025–26: Dodecanese FCA First Division, 4th (withdrew)

Athlitikos Omilos Pyli Kos (Greek: Αθλητικός Όμιλος Πυλίου Κω) is a Greek football club based in Pyli, Kos, Dodecanese. Its official colors are maroon and white. The club plays its home matches at the "Dimitris Roufas" Pyli Municipal Stadium, located in the Agios Georgios area.

== History ==
=== A.O. Pyli Kos (1980–2005) ===
Officially founded in 1980, the club competed in the regional leagues of the Dodecanese FCA until the 2004–05 season.

=== A.O. Dikaios Kos (2005–2017) ===
In 2005, the club merged with Anagennisi Asfendiou (founded in 1981) to form Athlitikos Omilos Dikaios Kos. Under this name, the club won one Dodecanese FCA Second Division title (2007–08) and one Dodecanese FCA First Division championship (2011–12), earning promotion to the Delta Ethniki for the 2012–13 season. Additionally, they reached the final of the Dodecanese FCA Cup twice, finishing as runners-up in 2010–11 against Ialysos–Anagennisi Rodos and in 2011–12 against Aris Archangelos.

=== A.E. Dikaios–Antimachos Kos (2017–2019) ===
In 2017, A.O. Dikaios Kos merged with Antimachos Kos (founded in 1979) to form Athlitiki Enosi Dikaios–Antimachos Kos. During the 2017–18 season, the club won the Dodecanese FCA Cup, defeating Doxa Kardamaina 4–0 in the final.

=== A.O. Pyli Kos (2019–present) ===
In the summer of 2019, the general assembly of the club's members updated its statute, restoring the original name to Athlitikos Omilos Pyli Kos as well as its traditional colors, while designating the Pyli Stadium in the Agios Georgios area as its primary home ground.

In the 2019–20 season, A.O. Pyli Kos won the Dodecanese FCA First Division championship and earned promotion to the Gamma Ethniki. During the 2020–21 season, competing in Gamma Ethniki as the 4th tier of Greek football, they finished 3rd in Group 8 behind Thyella Rafina and Aiolikos, and ahead of Aias Salamina. In the 2021–22 season, following the 2021 league restructuring, they played in Gamma Ethniki as the 3rd tier for the first time, remaining in the division until the 2023–24 season.

After spending two years in the Dodecanese FCA First Division, the club considered self-relegation to the Second Division due to financial difficulties.

== Honours ==
=== Regional ===
- Dodecanese FCA First Division (2): 2011–12, 2019–20
- Dodecanese FCA Cup (1): 2017–18
