= AO Poros F.C. =

Póros
- Full name: Αθλητικός Όμιλος Πόρου; Athlitikós Ómilos Pórou; Poros Athletic Club
- Founded: 2012; 14 years ago
- Ground: Nikos Kazantzakis Stadium
- Manager: Konstantinos Tzobanakis
- League: Heraklion FCA First Division
- 2022–23: Gamma Ethniki (Group 5), 12th (relegated)
Home colours

A.O. Poros F.C., short for Athlitikos Omilos Porou (Greek: Αθλητικός Όμιλος Πόρου, translated Athletic Club of Poros) and also known simply as Poros, is a Greek football club, based in the Póros urban area in Heraklion, Crete. The club was founded in 2012. They currently compete in the Gamma Ethniki, the third tier of the Greek football league system, and host their home games in the Nikos Kazantzakis Stadium, known also as “Martinengo Stadium”.

== Honours ==
=== Regional ===
- Heraklion FCA Championship
  - Winners (1): 2018−19

== Players ==
=== Current squad ===
As of 23 January 2020

Note: Flags indicate national team as defined under FIFA eligibility rules; some limited exceptions apply. Players may hold more than one non-FIFA nationality.

No.	Pos.	Nation	Player
1	GK	GRE	Panagiotis Papadopoulos
2	DF	GRE	Konstantinos Ziogas
4	DF	POR	Rodrigo Alírio
5	DF	GRE	Athanasios Patiniotis
3	DF	GUI	Papi Mohamed Kourouma
7	MF	GRE	Alexandros Spiliotis

No.	Pos.	Nation	Player
6	MF	GRE	Andreas Zacharioudakis
8	MF	ALB	Leonard Senka
14	FW	GRE	Leonidas Megalos
10	FW	GRE	Charalampos Pilios
9	FW	CMR	Moussa Pokong
11	FW	GRE	Antonis Amarantidis
