= Aetos Varvara F.C. =

Aetos Varvara
- Full name: Athlitikos Politistikos Syllogos Aetos Varvara
- Founded: 1979; 47 years ago
- Ground: Varvara Municipal Stadium
- Chairman: Georgios Kotakis
- Manager: Georgios Alvanos
- League: Chalkidiki FCA First Division
- 2025–26: Chalkidiki FCA First Division, 2nd

Aetos Varvara Football Club (Greek: Α.Ε.Σ. Αετός Βαρβάρας) is a Greek football club based in Varvara, Chalkidiki, Greece.

== History ==
The history of Aetos Varvara began in 1979, when a small group of local villagers, driven by passion and dedication to football, decided to establish their own club. Initially, the team competed solely in friendly matches; however, their drive for sports led them to construct a home ground using their own resources, enabling them to register and compete in the Chalkidiki Football Clubs Association Championship the following year. Inspired by the area's rich natural environment and mountainous landscape, the club's founding members adopted white and green as its primary colors, carrying their native land on their jerseys. Later, the club chose the eagle as its crest and symbol, seeking a wild mountain animal to represent superiority, freedom, and the spirit of victory.

The club won its first regional championship during the 2011–12 season, finishing with an impressive 15 to 16-point lead over the runner-up. This victory qualified them for the Delta Ethniki promotion play-offs, though they ultimately fell short of securing promotion. The club captured its next title during the 2019–20 season, which was curtailed due to the COVID-19 pandemic. Sitting in first place with approximately seven matches remaining when play was suspended, Aetos Varvara was declared champion and earned automatic promotion to the Gamma Ethniki for the first time.

During the 2022–23 season, Aetos Varvara secured another league championship title, mathematically clinching first place three matchdays before the end of the season with a 10-point lead over the second-placed team.

During the 2021–22 season, Aetos Varvara won the Chalkidiki FCA Cup for the first time in its history, defeating AO Chanioti 1–0 in extra time.

== Honours ==
=== Domestic ===
  - Chalkidiki FCA Champions: 3
    - 2011–12, 2019–20, 2022–23
  - Chalkidiki FCA Cup Winners: 1
    - 2021–22
