= Digenis Neochori F.C. =

Digenis Neochori
- Founded: 1956; 70 years ago
- Ground: "Babis Papachatzis" Ground
- Chairman: Georgios Alexiou
- Manager: Panagiotis Kyparissis
- League: Gamma Ethniki
- 2025–26: Trikala FCA First Division, 1st (promoted)
- Website: http://digenisfc.gr

Digenis Neochori Football Club (Greek: Διγενής Νεοχωρίου) is a Greek football club based in Oichalia, Trikala, Greece.

== Honours ==
=== Domestic ===
  - Trikala FCA Champions: 9
    - 1980–81, 1986–87, 1989–90, 1992–93, 2016–17, 2018–19, 2021–22, 2024–25, 2025–26
  - Trikala FCA Cup Winners: 5
    - 1982–83, 1986–87, 2016–17, 2017–18
