= Aris Avato F.C. =

Aris Avato
- Full name: A.M.P.S Aris Avato Football Club
- Founded: 1958; 68 years ago
- Ground: Avato Municipal Stadium
- Capacity: 600
- Chairman: Ilias Kotopoulos
- Manager: Dimitrios Karydis
- League: Xanthi FCA First Division
- 2025–26: Xanthi FCA First Division, 2nd

Aris Avato Football Club (Greek: Α.Μ.Π.Σ. Άρης Αβάτου) is a Greek football club based in Avato, Xanthi, Greece.

== Honours ==
=== Domestic ===
  - Xanthi FCA Champions: 3
    - 2013–14, 2014–15, 2016–17
  - Xanthi FCA Cup Winners: 4
    - 2016–17, 2017–18, 2023–24, 2024–25
  - Xanthi FCA Super Cup Winners: 1
    - 2024
