= Megas Alexandros Orfani F.C. =

Greek football club

Megas Alexandros Orfani FC
- Full name: Athlitikos Syllogos Megas Alexandros Orfani
- Founded: 1974; 52 years ago
- Dissolved: 29 May 2026; 4 months ago
- Ground: Orfani Municipal Stadium
- League: Kavala FCA

Megas Alexandros Orfani Football Club (Greek: Α.Σ. Μέγας Αλέξανδρος Ορφανίου) was a Greek football club based in Orfani, Kavala, Greece.

== Honours ==
Megas Alexandros Orfani FC honours
Type	Competition	Titles	Seasons
Domestic	Greek Football Amateur Cup	1	1987-88
Regional	Kavala FCA First division Championship	4	1986–87, 1987–88, 1995–96, 2019-20
Regional	Kavala FCA Cup	3	1986–87, 1987–88, 1993–94
