= Aias Gastouni F.C. =

Association football club in Greece

Aias Gastouni
- Full name: Athlitikos Syllogos Aias Gastouni
- Founded: 1919; 107 years ago
- Ground: Gastouni Municipal Stadium
- Capacity: 1,000
- Chairman: Konstantina Kladi
- Manager: Juan Ramón Rocha
- League: Elis FCA First Division
- 2025–26: Elis FCA First Division, 4th
- Website: Official website
Home colours	Away colours

Aias Gastouni (Greek: Αίας Γαστούνης) is a Greek football club based in Gastouni, Elis. The official foundation year of the club is 1919, and its official colors are red and white.

== History ==
=== Founding and early history ===
Aias Gastouni originally existed in Gastouni starting in 1919, initially featuring a crest depicting a ship named "Aias," honoring the eponymous hero from Homer's epic, the Iliad. The club operated independently, playing numerous friendly matches during the 1930s against other unofficial football teams across Elis. During the Metaxas regime, all sports clubs—including Aias—were required to align their statutes under a unified framework, leading to the official establishment of "Athlitikos Syllogos Aias Gastouni" in 1939.

During the 1951–52 season, Aias participated for the first time in the regional championship of the Patras Football Clubs Association. In the 1969–70 season, following the founding of the Elis Football Clubs Association, the club became one of the ten founding members of the association and competed in its top division during its inaugural championship. In terms of honours, the club has won seven Elis regional championships, six Elis regional cups, and one Greek Amateur Cup, which represents the highest distinction in the club's history.

=== National divisions and achievements ===
During the 1981–82 season, Aias Gastouni competed in a national division for the first time, participating in the 3rd Group of the National Amateur Division, which functioned as the third tier of Greek football. Garnering 38 points in 28 matches with a goal tally of 39 for and 24 against, Aias finished 5th in the standings, placing one position above Asteras Amaliada and ahead of historic clubs such as Kalamata, Pankorinthiakos, and AO Sparti.

The 1986–87 season is particularly noteworthy for Aias Gastouni, as the club won the Elis FCA championship to earn promotion back to Delta Ethniki, alongside securing the Elis FCA Cup by defeating Asteras Amaliada in the final. This victory granted the team entry into the nationwide Greek Football Amateur Cup. Following an exceptional run in the tournament, Aias faced the amateur team of PAS Giannina in the final at the neutral Georgios Karaiskakis Stadium in Piraeus, winning 2–1. To this day, Aias remains the only club from the Elis prefecture to have captured this title, with Paniliakos being the only other team from the region to reach the final.

During the 2019–20 season, Aias Gastouni secured its seventh and most recent Elis Football Clubs Association championship title to date and earned its promotion to Gamma Ethniki.

On 17 November 2025, club president Nikos Kardaris announced the appointment of Greek football legend Juan Ramón Rocha as head coach.

On 13 August 2026, following the resignation of president Nikos Kardaris, a new board meeting was convened where Konstantina Kladi was elected as the new president of the club.

== Honours ==
=== National ===
- Greek Amateur Cup
  - Winners (1): 1986–87

=== Regional ===
- Elis FCA First Division
  - Winners (7): 1980–81, 1986–87, 1990–91, 1995–96, 2001–02, 2004–05, 2019–20
- Elis FCA Cup
  - Winners (6): 1986–87, 1989–90, 1992–93, 1993–94, 1995–96, 1996–97
- Achaea FCA Second Division
  - Winners (1): 1966–67
