= Svoronos =

Svoronos Σβορώνος
- Community
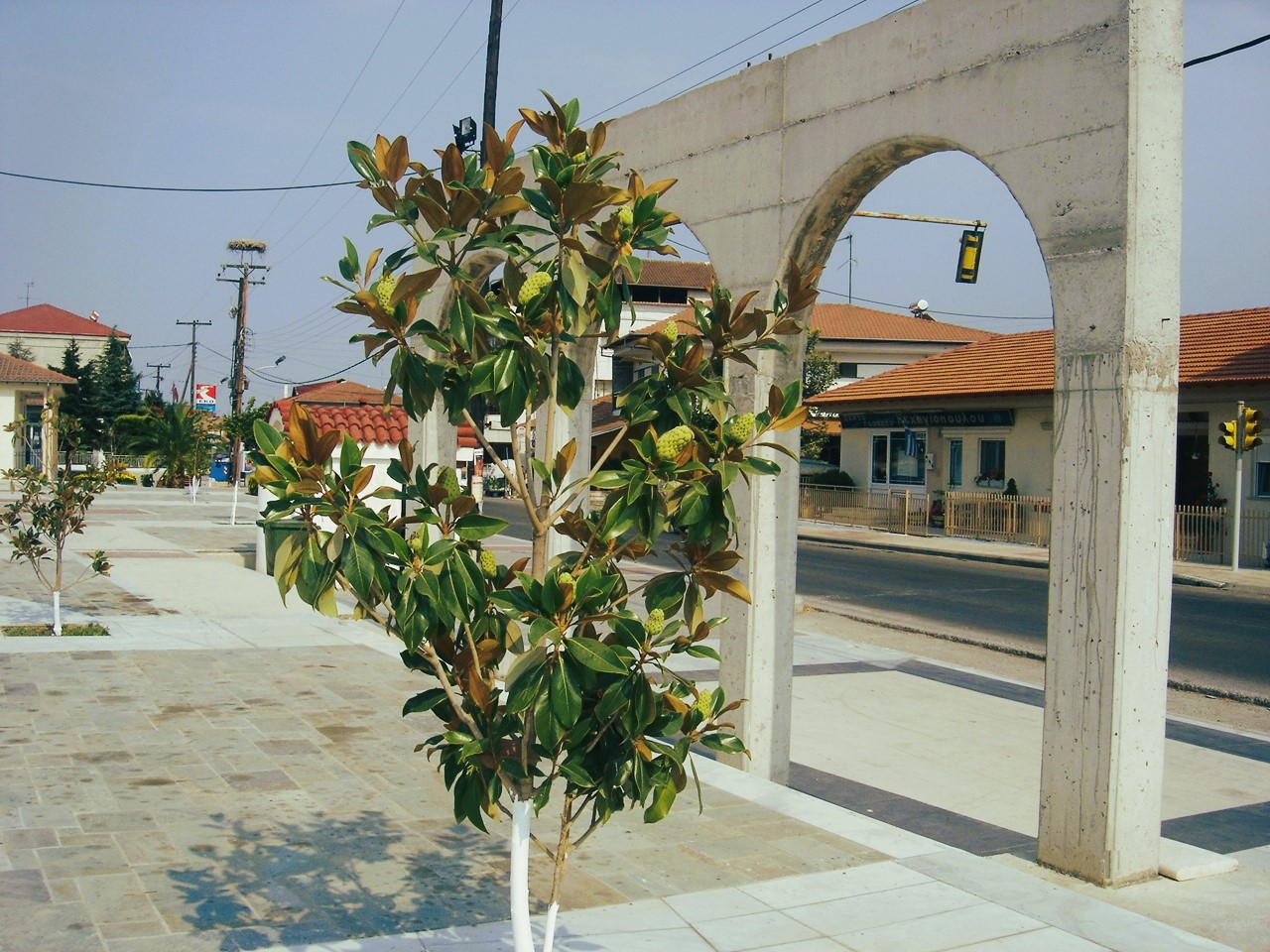
- A square in Svoronos

- Location within Greece
- Coordinates: 40°16′N 22°28′E
- Country: Greece
- Administrative region: Central Macedonia
- Regional unit: Pieria
- Municipality: Katerini
- Municipal unit: Katerini
- Elevation: 45 m (148 ft)

Population (2021)
  - Community: 2,062
- Time zone: UTC+2 (EET)
  - Summer (DST): UTC+3 (EEST)
- Postal code: 601 50
- Area code: +30-2351
- Vehicle registration: KN

Svoronos (Greek: Σβορώνος) is a village and a community of the Katerini municipality. Before the 2011 local government reform it was part of the municipality of Katerini, of which it was a municipal district. The 2021 census recorded 2,062 residents in the community.

== Administrative division ==
The community of Svoronos consists of the settlements Svoronos, Agia Varvara and Prosilio.

== Notable natives ==
- Kyriakos Papadopoulos

== See also ==
- List of settlements in the Pieria regional unit
