= Ypato =

Ypato Ύπατο
- Community
- Location within Greece
- Coordinates: 38°23′N 23°24′E
- Country: Greece
- Administrative region: Central Greece
- Regional unit: Boeotia
- Municipality: Thebes
- Municipal unit: Thebes

Population (2021)
  - Community: 316
- Time zone: UTC+2 (EET)
  - Summer (DST): UTC+3 (EEST)

Ypato (Greek: Ύπατο) is a village in Thebes Municipality, Boeotia, Greece. It is located east of Thebes, in the slopes of Mount Ypatio. According to the 2021 Census, it has 316 residents. There's a church that is located 3 kilometres (1.9 mi) from the village, called Church of Transfiguration of Jesus of Sagmata, built close to Mount Ypatio.

== Etymology ==
The village was known as Syrtzi (Σύρτζι) until 1930, when it was renamed to Ypato.

== See also ==
- List of settlements in Boeotia
