= Poseidon Nea Michaniona F.C. =

Poseidon Michaniona
- Full name: Athlitikos Syllogos Poseidon Nea Michaniona
- Nickname: Κυανόλευκοι (The Blue-whites)
- Founded: 1947; 79 years ago
- Stadium: Nea Michaniona Municipal Stadium
- Chairman: Stelios Kalfas
- Manager: Georgios Amanatidis
- League: Gamma Ethniki
- 2025–26: Gamma Ethniki (Group 1), 5th
Home colours	Away colours

Athlitikos Syllogos Poseidon Nea Michaniona (Greek: Aθλητικός Σύλλογος Ποσειδών Νέας Μηχανιώνας) is a Greek football club based in Michaniona, Greece.

== History ==
Poseidon Nea Michaniona was founded in 1947, and its colors are blue and white. In 1969, it earned promotion from the Third to the Second Division of the Macedonia FCA, and reached the First Division the following year. It remained there until 1982, when it won promotion to the Delta Ethniki. During the 1982–83 season, the team retained its place in the division with relative ease, and in the 1983–84 season, under player-manager Sakis Zarzopoulos, achieved an impressive second-half comeback to finish in first place, earning promotion to the Gamma Ethniki for the first time in its history.

A major moment in the club's history occurred during the 1998–99 Greek Football Cup, when Apollon Paralimniou secured a historic 1–0 victory over AEK Athens in the first round.

Since the 2019–20 season, the club has been competing continuously in the Gamma Ethniki.

== Honours ==
=== National ===
  - Fourth Tier Champions: 3
    - 1983–84, 1990–91, 2020–21

=== Domestic ===
  - Macedonia FCA Champions: 3
    - 1981–82, 1988–89, 2018–19
  - Macedonia FCA Cup Winners: 1
    - 1994–95
  - Greek Football Amateur Cup: 1
    - 1994–95
