= A.E. Mykonos F.C. =

Association football club in Greece

A.E. Mykonos
- Full name: Athlitiki Enosi Mykonos
- Founded: 2020; 6 years ago
- Ground: Korfos Municipal Stadium
- Capacity: 700
- Chairman: Stamatis Dachtylidis
- Manager: Vangelis Chantes
- League: Gamma Ethniki
- 2025–26: Gamma Ethniki (Group 6), 4th

A.E. Mykonos (Greek: Αθλητική Ένωση Μυκόνου) is a Greek football club based in Mykonos, Cyclades. Founded in 2020, its official club colours are blue and white. The club plays its primary home matches at Korfos Municipal Stadium and uses Ano Mera Stadium as its secondary ground.

== History ==
In the summer of 2020, the administrators of the two main clubs on the island of Mykonos, A.O. Mykonos (founded in 1981) and A.S. Ano Mera Mykonos (founded in 1989), decided to merge the two associations in order to create a more competitive team capable of sustaining itself in the higher divisions of Greece. The new club was named A.E. Mykonos (Athletic Union of Mykonos) and took the place of A.S. Ano Mera in the Gamma Ethniki, while a secondary team (A.E. Mykonos B) was formed to take the place of A.O. Mykonos in the local Cyclades FCA championship.

Since the 2021–22 season, the men's football department of A.E. Mykonos competes in the third tier Gamma Ethniki.

During the 2022–23 season, A.E. Mykonos won the Cyclades FCA Cup by defeating Hellas Syros 2–0 in the final.

== Honours ==
=== Domestic ===
  - Cyclades FCA Cup Winners: 1
    - 2022–23
