= A.E. Lefkimmi F.C. =

Greek football club

A.E. Lefkimmi
- Full name: Athlitiki Enosi Lefkimmi
- Founded: 1951; 75 years ago
- Ground: Lefkimmi Municipal Stadium
- Capacity: 500
- Chairman: Alexandros Alexakis
- Manager: Kostas Christoforakis
- League: Gamma Ethniki
- 2025–26: Gamma Ethniki (Group 3), 7th
Home colours	Away colours

A.E. Lefkimmi Football Club (Greek: Α.Ε. Λευκίμμης) is a Greek football club based in Lefkimmi, Corfu, Greece.

== History ==
=== Establishment and first years ===
In the early 1950s, the young people of Lefkimmi, free from the fear of occupation and in general of a turbulent era, timidly took their first steps regarding the establishment of sports clubs. The neighborhoods of Riglades create football teams and give them names in order to symbolize strength and pride, in order to impress the opponents. "Aetos" is born in Baghdad (Anaplades), "Doxa" in Maniouratika and "Keravnos" is created in Agioi Pantes and in Tsartsada, where all three neighboring teams are the ancestors of the club. OL) created in 1951, with Prokopis Chrysikopoulos as its first president. However, the prosperous course of the people of Ano Lefkimmi in the field of sports will stand as an opportunity to create a second team in the same area. "Diagoras" was therefore the second group of Lefkimmi and represented the settlements of Agioi Theodoroi, Panagia, Melikion and Potamio. On 9 June 1968, by decision of its general assembly, Diagoras was renamed "AO Lefkimmi".

=== The merger ===
However, despite the fact that the contacts and relations between the two clubs were marked by intense rivalry or even enmity, many times they will eventually reach the merger and the creation of the club Palevkimimikos Athletic Club (PAO) in 1974.

Pallefkimmiikos will change over time into a strong pole for claiming football distinctions that have long monopolized the clubs of the region, immediately changing the data and the correlations of Corfu football. However, he won the championship for the second time in the period 1987–88 and participated in the special amateur football championship 1988 without being able to rise again in the D national team. In 1990–91 he won for the 3rd time s the FCA Corfu championship and climbed back into the Delta Ethniki.

They also won a cup of FCA Corfu, in 1986–87.

=== Renaming ===
In 1990, Pallefkimmiikos was renamed the Athletic Union of Lefkimmi (AEL), representing all the villages / settlements of the Lefkimmi area. However, in the championships, the name AE Lefkimmi appeared from the 1991–92 season. Lefkimmis participates in the Delta Ethniki, where they competed for four seasons (1991–92 until 1994–95) whenever they were demoted. Then they competed in the local championship with the exception of the years 1996–97, 1999–00 and 2009–10 when they competed again in the Delta Ethniki as a champion of Corfu.

In 2016–17, Lefkimmi won the Corfu championship again and won the promotion to the Gamma Ethniki for the first time.

In 2017–18, Lefkimmi won in 6th place in the championship and remained in the category.

In 2018–19, Lefkimmi finished one place higher, in 5th, remaining another year in the Gamma Ethniki.

In the 2024–25 season, Lefkimmi won the Corfu FCA championship for the 8th time in its history and secured promotion back to Gamma Ethniki.

In the 2025–26 season, Lefkimmi won the Corfu FCA Cup for the 7th time by defeating Thinaliakos 2–0 in the final, while also securing its stay in Gamma Ethniki by finishing 7th in Group 3.

== Honours ==
=== Domestic ===
  - Corfu FCA Champions: 8
    - 1985–86, 1987–88, 1990–91, 1995–96, 1998–99, 2008–09, 2016–17, 2024–25
  - Corfu FCA Cup Winners: 7
    - 1974–75, 1986–87, 1993–94, 2004–05, 2016–17, 2023–24, 2025–26
  - Corfu FCA Super Cup Winners: 3
    - 2017, 2024, 2026
