= P.O. Fiki F.C. =

P.O. Fikis
- Full name: Podosfairikos Omilos Fikis
- Founded: 1971; 55 years ago
- Ground: Fiki Municipal Stadium
- Chairman: Apostolis Giannopoulos
- League: Trikala FCA Second Division
- 2025–26: Trikala FCA First Division, 16th (withdrew)

P.O. Fikis Football Club (Greek: Ποδοσφαιρικός Όμιλος Φήκης) is a Greek football club based in Fiki, Trikala, Greece.

== Honours ==
=== Domestic ===
  - Trikala FCA Champions: 1
    - 2019–20
  - Trikala FCA Cups: 2
    - 2021–22, 2022–23

== Notable players ==
- Georgios Koltsidas
- Vangelis Nasiakos
- Thanasis Tsirogiannis
- Ioannis Skondras
- Nikos Skondras
- Georgios Niklitsiotis
