= A.E. Ermionida F.C. =

Association football club in Greece

Ermionida
- Full name: Athletic Union Ermionida
- Founded: 2011; 15 years ago
- Ground: Municipal Stadium of Kranidi
- Capacity: 800
- Chairman: Anargyros Liberopoulos
- Manager: Alexandros Mantzounis
- League: Argolida FCA First Division
- 2025–26: Argolida FCA First Division, 5th
- Website: http://ermionidafc.gr
Home colours	Away colours

old logo of the team

A.E Ermionida F.C. (Greek: Α.Ε. Ερμιονίδας) is a Greek football club based in Kranidi, Argolis.

== History ==
The club was founded in 2011 after the merge of A.E.K. Kranidi and Ermis Ermioni.

The club earned promotion to the second tier for the first time in the 2013–14 season. Despite having an amazing season in the Football League during the 2014–15 season and finishing 5th collecting 41 points out of 24 matches, the club got relegated through the play-offs.

The club badge resembles Hermes, one of the 12 Olympian gods in Ancient Greek religion.

== Honours ==
=== Domestic ===
- Gamma Ethniki
  - Winners (1): 2013–14
- Delta Ethniki
  - Winners (1): 2012–13
- Argolida FCA First Division
  - Winners (1): 2024–25
- Argolis FCA Cup
  - Winners (1): 2017–18

== Players ==
=== Current squad ===
As of 2 Nov 2025. Note: Flags indicate national team as defined under FIFA eligibility rules; some limited exceptions apply. Players may hold more than one non-FIFA nationality.

No.	Pos.	Nation	Player
15	GK	GRE	Ioannis Apostolou
1	GK	GRE	Fotis Koumparoulis
3	DF	GRE	Giorgos Stergiou
8	DF	GRE	Alexandros Fournaros
5	DF	GRE	Paris Zavvos
12	DF	GRE	Angelos Bountalis
2	DF	GRE	Lefteris Stergiou
19	DF	GRE	Klajdi Mehmetaj
20	DF	GRE	Konstantinos Papadopoulos Elissaios
15	MF	ALB	Kleo Llapushi
9	MF	GRE	Angelos Syrpis
11	MF	GRE	Lazaros Doumtsis

No.	Pos.	Nation	Player
14	MF	GRE	Giorgos Chatziroditis
17	MF	ALB	Mario Mamutaj
6	MF	GRE	Vasilis Fournaros
10	FW	ALB	Kristo Qeli
7	FW	GRE	Giorgos Tribonias (Captain)
