= Neo Keramidi =

Neo Keramidi Νέο Κεραμίδι
- Settlement
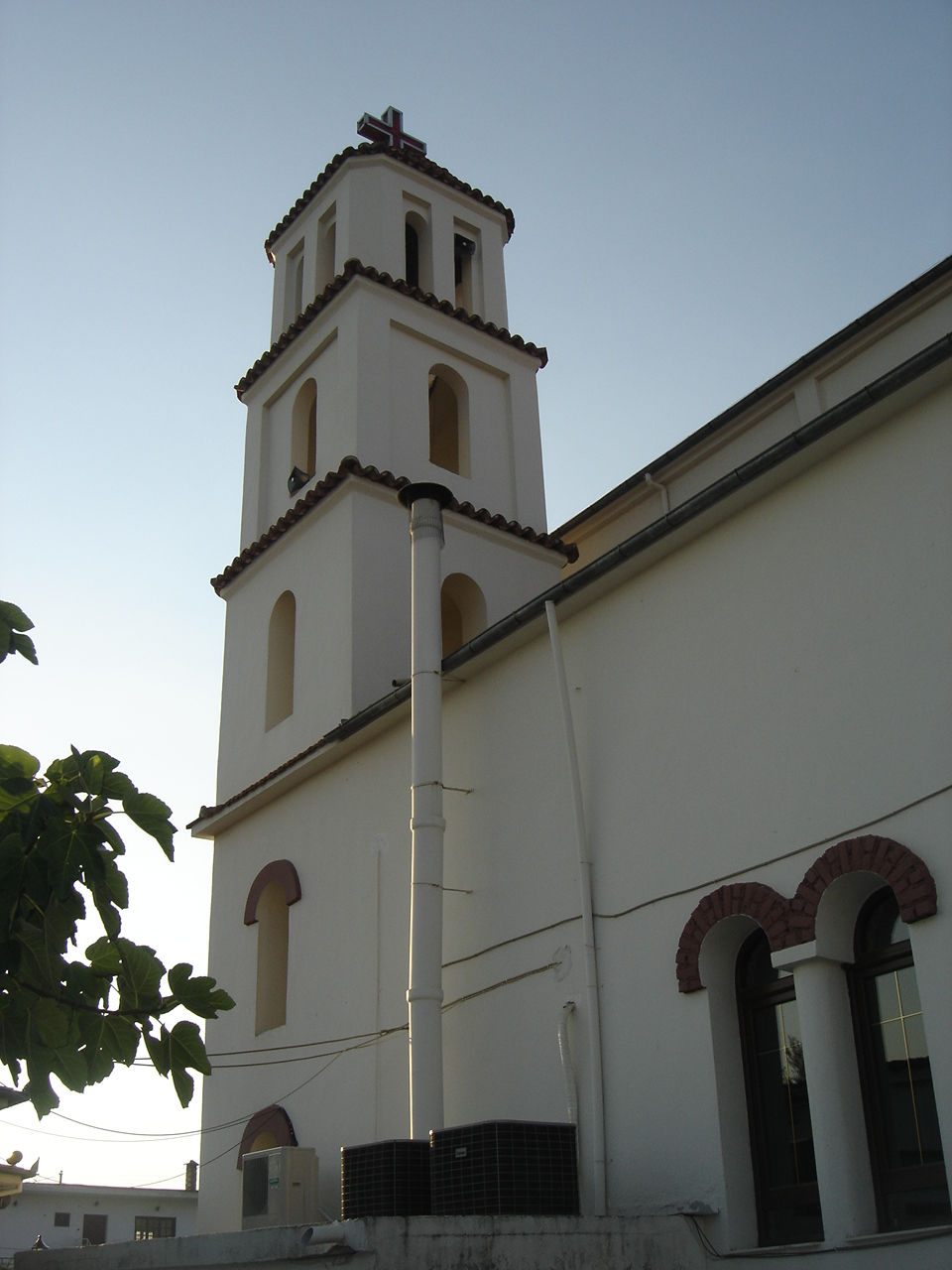
- A church in Neo Keramidi

- Location within Greece
- Coordinates: 40°17.15′N 22°27.8′E
- Country: Greece
- Administrative region: Central Macedonia
- Regional unit: Pieria
- Municipality: Katerini
- Municipal unit: Katerini
- Community: Katerini
- Elevation: 60 m (200 ft)

Population (2021)
  - Total: 511
- Time zone: UTC+2 (EET)
  - Summer (DST): UTC+3 (EEST)
- Postal code: 601 50
- Area code: +30-2351
- Vehicle registration: KN

Neo Keramidi (Greek: Νέο Κεραμίδι) is a village and a part of the municipality of Katerini. The 2021 census recorded 511 inhabitants in the village.

== See also ==
- List of settlements in the Pieria regional unit
