= Thyella Rafina F.C. =

Thyella Rafina
- Full name: A.P.O. Thyella Diastavrosi Rafina
- Nickname: Λιγνιτωρύχοι (Lignite miners)
- Founded: 1957; 69 years ago
- Ground: Municipal Rafina Stadium "Panagiotis Skoufos"
- Capacity: 300
- Chairman: Spyros Loukatos
- Manager: Paraskevas Andralas
- League: Gamma Ethniki
- 2025–26: Gamma Ethniki (Group 6), 6th
- Website: http://thiellafc.gr
Home colours	Away colours

Thyella Rafina Football Club (Greek: Α.Π.Ο. Θύελλα Διασταύρωσης Ραφήνας) is a Greek football club based in Rafina, Attica, Greece.

The club was founded in 1957. They will play in Gamma Ethniki for the season 2026–27.

== History ==
A.P.O. Thyella Rafina was founded in 1957 by local residents of Rafina, the majority of whom worked as lignite miners. Before adopting green and white as its official colors, the club went through several variations including yellow-black, red-white, and yellow-red, while its crest featured the letter Theta, representing the initial of its name.

== Colours ==
Green for many pines and black for charcoal which the area produced.

== Honours ==
=== Domestic ===
  - Fourth Division: 1
    - 2020–21
  - East Attica FCA Champions: 3
    - 2012–13, 2014–15, 2015–16
  - East Attica FCA Cup: 2
    - 2014–15, 2017–18
