= Avato =

Settlement in the Xanthi regional unit of Greece

Avato Άβατο
- Community
- Location within Greece
- Coordinates: 40°57′31″N 24°48′20″E
- Country: Greece
- Administrative region: Eastern Macedonia and Thrace
- Regional unit: Xanthi
- Municipality: Topeiros

Population (2021)
  - Community: 956
- Time zone: UTC+2 (EET)
  - Summer (DST): UTC+3 (EEST)

Avato (Greek: Άβατο meaning impassable, sacrosanct) is a settlement in the Xanthi regional unit of Greece. It is located 3 kilometers south southeast of Evlalo and 24.7 kilometers north northeast of Xanthi. In 2021, the population of Avato was 956 inhabitants. The settlement belongs to the municipality of Topeiros.

A number of residents are of African-Greek descent with roots dating back to Ottoman times, when their ancestors have been brought to Avato as slaves from Sudan.

The ancestors of Thrace’s Afrogreeks were brought by an Ottoman pasha from Egypt (likely by Ibrahim’s son, Mohammed Ali), since the area was an Egyptian estate during the years of Ottoman occupation.

As slavery was widespread in North Africa at the time, Turkish Sudan, according to scholars, was a major source of slaves. The Ottoman Empire was one of the main customers.

300–350 years ago, ships with black slaves bought by local beys sailed to the town of Abdera, Thrace.
