= 2019–20 Greek Football Cup =

2019–20 Greek Cup

Tournament details
- Country: Greece
- Teams: 84

Final positions
- Champions: Olympiacos (28 titles)
- Runners-up: AEK Athens

Tournament statistics
- Matches played: 107
- Goals scored: 264 (2.47 per match)
- Top goal scorer(s): Dimitrios Pelkas; Georgios Pamlidis (4 goals each)

The 2019–20 Greek Football Cup is the 78th season of the Greek Football Cup. A total of 84 clubs are accepted to enter. 14 from the Super League 1 (1st tier), 12 from the Super League 2 (2nd tier), 14 from the Football League (3rd tier) and 44 previous season local Cup winners. The Second Leg Semi-Final matches and the Final were postponed due to the COVID-19 pandemic in Greece until June.

The Final was originally scheduled for 26 July and was postponed to 30 August because of Olympiacos' pressure in HFF to change the stadium from Georgios Kamaras Stadium to Olympic Stadium and after the no of the Hellenic Police in the first stadium. The Final was rescheduled for 30 August in the Olympic Stadium but it was postponed again because Olympiacos' player Maximiliano Lovera was tested positive for COVID-19. The Final was rescheduled again for 12 September at Panthessaliko Stadium in Volos.

== Calendar ==
Round	Date(s)	Fixtures	Clubs	New entries	Leagues entering
First Round	24, 25, 28 August & 17 September 2019	21	84 → 62	44	Local Cup Winners
Second Round	31 August, 1, 4, 8, 15 September & 2 October 2019	11	62 → 51	none	none
Third Round	14, 15, 18, 25 September & 16 October 2019	12	51 → 39	14	Football League
Fourth Round	24–26 September, 2, 9, 23 October 2019	12	39 → 27	12	Super League 2
Fifth Round	29–31 October & 3–5 December 2019	22	27 → 16	9	Super League 1, places 6–14
Round of 16	7–9, 14–16 January 2020	16	16 → 8	5	Super League 1, places 1–5
Quarter-finals	4–6, 11–13 February 2020	8	8 → 4	none	none
Semi-finals	4 March & 24 June 2020	4	4 → 2	none	none
Final	12 September 2020	1	2 → 1	none	none

== Participating clubs ==
Super League 1	Super League 2	Football League	2018−19 Local Cup Winners		
AEK Athens; AEL; Aris; Asteras Tripolis; Atromitos; Lamia; OFI; Olympiacos; Panathinaikos; Panetolikos; Panionios; PAOK; Volos; Xanthi	Apollon Larissa; Apollon Pontus; Apollon Smyrnis; Chania; Doxa Drama; Ergotelis; Karaiskakis; Kerkyra; Levadiakos; Panachaiki; PAS Giannina; Platanias	Diagoras; Egaleo; Enosis Aspropyrgos; Ialysos; Ierapetra; Ionikos; Kavala; Kalamata; Niki Volos; Olympiacos Volos; Thesprotos; Triglia; Trikala; Veria	Acharnaikos; AEEK SYNKA; Aetos Orfano; Aiolikos; Apollon Efpalio^{2}; APO Atalanti; Atromitos Agios Georgios; Atromitos Patras; Atsalenios; Doxa Arta; Edessaikos; PO Elassona; Episkopi; Ethnikos Alexandroupoli; Ethnikos Piraeus; ~~Grevena Aerata~~^{1}	Ilisiakos; Karitsa; Korinthos; Leonidio; Makedonikos Foufas; Megas Alexandros Iasmos; Megas Alexandros Kallithea; ~~Meliteas Meliti~~^{1}; Meteora; Nea Artaki; Omiros Neochori; Orfeas Xanthi; Pallixouriakos; Panargiakos	Pandramaikos; Enosis Vathyllos-Pansamiakos; Panserraikos; Panthiraikos; PAONE Eptalofos^{3}; Pellana; Potamia; Sellana; Souli Paramythia; Thermaikos; Thinaliakos; ~~Thriamvos Serviana~~^{1}; Tilikratis; Xenophon Krestena; Ypato; Zakynthos^{4}

Notes:

1.Grevena Aerata, Meliteas Meliti and Thriamvos Serviana withdrew from the competition. Their respective FCA Cup finalists were invited instead, but in each case, did not accept the bid to enter either.
2.Asteras Itea, winners of the 2018−19 Phocis FCA Cup, withdrew from the competition and their spot was filled by 2018−19 finalists Apollon Efpalio.
3.Alexandros Kilkis, winners of the 2018−19 Kilkis FCA Cup, withdrew from the competition and their spot was filled by 2018−19 finalists PAONE Eptalofos.
4.Katastari, winners of the 2018−19 Zakynthos FCA Cup, withdrew from the competition and their spot was filled by 2018−19 finalists Zakynthos.

== Qualifying rounds ==
=== First round ===
The draw for this round took place on 9 August 2019. The majority of fixtures were held on 24, 25 and 28 August 2019.

Two of the fixtures, Kalamata–Atromitos Patras and Enosis Vathyllos-Pansamiakos–Aiolikos were postponed in light the bids of Kalamata and Aiolikos to enter the Football League. Kalamata were eventually greenlighted to play in the Football League by decision of the HFF, taking the place of Nestos Chrysoupoli, who withdrew their participation. As such, despite being drawn against Atromitos Patras, they advanced to the Third Round draw on walkover. Likewise, Atromitos advanced to the next round on walkover.

==== Summary ====
Team 1	Score	Team 2
24 August 2019
Tilikratis	3–1	Sellana
25 August 2019
Pellana	2–0	Atromitos Agios Georgios
Pallixouriakos	0–1	Xenophon Krestena
Thinaliakos	2–1	Potamia
Megas Alexandros Iasmos	0–3 (w/o)	Pandramaikos
Ethnikos Alexandroupoli	0–7	Aetos Orfano
Panserraikos	2–2 (4–3 p)	Orfeas Xanthi
PAONE Eptalofos	0–4	Karitsa
Makedonikos Foufas	3–2	Megas Alexandros Kallithea
Edessaikos	1–2	Thermaikos
PO Elassona	0–0 (4–2 p)	Souli Paramythia
APO Atalanti	2–0	Meteora
Apollon Efpalio	3–0	Omiros Neochori
Korinthos	2–0	Leonidio
Nea Artaki	2–2 (2–3 p)	Ethnikos Piraeus
Episkopi	1–0	Atsalenios
Acharnaikos	0–3	AEEK SYNKA
28 August 2019
Doxa Arta	2–0	Zakynthos
Ypato	5–0	Panargiakos
Panthiraikos	3–0	Ilisiakos
17 September 2019
Enosis Vathyllos-Pansamiakos	0–0 (2–4 p)	Aiolikos
N/A
Kalamata	bye	
Atromitos Patras	bye	

Notes:
1. Megas Alexandros Iasmos withdrew from the competition.

==== Matches ====
24 August 2019
17:00 EEST

Tilikratis	3–1	Sellana
Kolovos 53'; Katagis 65' (pen.); Georgousis 84'	Report	Bakratsas 86'

Lefkada Stadium, Lefkada
Referee: Aristotelis Kostoulas (Arta)

25 August 2019
16:00 EEST

Pellana	2–0	Atromitos Agios Georgios
Mikelatos 35'; Platanas 45'	Report

Sparta Municipal Stadium, Sparta
Referee: Nikolaos Avgerinos (Arcadia)

25 August 2019
16:00 EEST

Pallixouriakos	0–1	Xenophon Krestena
	Report	Anamourlidis 36'

Agios Antonios Municipal Stadium, Lixouri
Referee: Konstantinos Kalamaris (Aetoloacarnania)

25 August 2019
16:30 EEST

Thinaliakos	2–1	Potamia
Agoras 34'; Mouzakitis 77'	Report	Genitsaropoulos 71'

Thinaliakos Municipal Stadium, Corfu
Referee: Marios Sintoris (Thesprotia)

25 August 2019
17:00 EEST

Megas Alexandros Iasmos	0–3 (Awarded)	Pandramaikos
	Report

Iasmos Municipal Stadium, Iasmos

25 August 2019
17:00 EEST

Ethnikos Alexandroupoli	0–7	Aetos Orfano
	Report	Fousteris 2', 41'; Karagiannidis 8'; Tsiloglou 9', 53'; Kampatzis 64'; Savvatianos 87'

Fotis Kosmas Stadium, Alexandroupolis
Referee: Christos Kakoulidis (Thrace)

25 August 2019
17:00 EEST

Panserraikos	2–2 (a.e.t.)	Orfeas Xanthi
Papavasiliou 38', 116'	Report	Xantinidis 53'; Soukrioglou 120'
Penalties
Papavasiliou (penalty missed); Psaltis (penalty scored); Gourtsas (penalty scored); Obosu (penalty scored); Zeris (penalty scored)	4–3	(penalty scored) Katranitsas; (penalty scored) Karagiozis; (penalty missed) Soukrioglou; (penalty scored) Halil Ibram; (penalty missed) Makrakis

Serres Municipal Stadium, Serres
Referee: Georgios Takidis (Kilkis)

25 August 2019
17:00 EEST

PAONE Eptalofos	0–4	Karitsa
	Report	Alexiou 31', 77'; Gika 47'; Costa 74'

Kilkis Municipal Stadium, Kilkis
Referee: Michail Michoulias (Macedonia)

25 August 2019
17:00 EEST

Makedonikos Foufas	3–2 (a.e.t.)	Megas Alexandros Kallithea
Topalis 52', 59' (pen.); Mavromatidis 117'	Report	Hasaj 87', 90'

Emilios Theofanidis Stadium, Ptolemaida
Referee: Konstantinos Sidiropoulos (Pella)

25 August 2019
17:00 EEST

Edessaikos	1–2	Thermaikos
Pantelidis 24'	Report	Achalinopoulos 70'; Stefanidis 76'

Municipal Stadium of Edessa, Edessa
Referee: Vasileios Polychroniou (Kastoria)

25 August 2019
17:00 EEST

PO Elassona	0–0 (a.e.t.)	Souli Paramythia
	Report
Penalties
Lagos (penalty scored); Chamos (penalty scored); Pepkolaj (penalty scored); Athanasoulis (penalty scored)	4–2	(penalty scored) Georgakis; (penalty missed) Mokos; (penalty scored) Dokos; (penalty missed) Karaboikis

Elassona Municipal Stadium, Elassona
Referee: Stylianos Leonidas (Trikala)

25 August 2019
17:00 EEST

APO Atalanti	2–0	Meteora
Chaikalis 41'; Dimos 63' (pen.)	Report

Atalanti Municipal Stadium, Atalanti
Referee: Marios Pogas (Euboea)

25 August 2019
17:00 EEST

Apollon Efpalio	3–0	Omiros Neochori
Roubatos 4'; Papandreou 55', 60'	Report

Malamata Stadium, Efpalio
Referee: Nikolaos Papakonstantinou (Messinia)

25 August 2019
17:00 EEST

Korinthos	2–0	Leonidio
Panteleou 9'; Tsokos 87'	Report

Korinthos Stadium, Corinth
Referee: Alexandros Fokas (Achaea)

25 August 2019
17:00 EEST

Nea Artaki	2–2 (a.e.t.)	Ethnikos Piraeus
Papadakis 32'; Spanos 75'	Report	Moustafidis 7'; Tsiavos 49'
Penalties
Balabanis (penalty missed); Georgiou (penalty missed); Vezyrtzoglou (penalty missed); Mavropoulos (penalty missed); Karantakis (penalty scored); Papadakis (penalty scored)	2–3	(penalty missed) Grammatikopoulos; (penalty missed) Makrostergios; (penalty missed) Tsiavos; (penalty scored) Skenderaj; (penalty scored) Lamprakis; (penalty scored) Daoulias

Nea Artaki Municipal Stadium, Nea Artaki
Referee: Stefanos Xirogiannis (Boeotia)

25 August 2019
17:00 EEST

Episkopi	1–0	Atsalenios
Karvouniaris 27'	Report

Theodoros Vardinogiannis Stadium, Heraklion
Referee: Michail Tampouratzis (Lasithi)

25 August 2019
17:00 EEST

Acharnaikos	0–3	AEEK SYNKA
	Report	Singh 26'; Pangalos 52'; Tsitas 81'

Acharnes Stadium, Acharnes
Referee: Aristidis Aliagas (West Attica)

28 August 2019
16:00 EEST

Doxa Arta	2–0	Zakynthos
Thanasis 7'; Ikonomou 44'	Report

Arta Stadium, Arta
Referee: Dimitrios Chouliaras (Preveza-Lefkada)

28 August 2019
17:00 EEST

Ypato	5–0	Panargiakos
Spiliotis 1', 48'; Kakkavas 10'; Potouridis 24'; Cadú 39'	Report

Thebes Municipal Stadium, Thebes
Referee: Vasilios Stamos (Elis)

28 August 2019
17:00 EEST

Panthiraikos	3–0	Ilisiakos
Valavanopoulos 6', 37'; Perialis 12'	Report

Municipal Panthiraikos Stadium, Santorini
Referee: Lampros Tsagarakis (Chania)

17 September 2019
16:00 EEST

Enosis Vathyllos-Pansamiakos	0–0 (a.e.t.)	Aiolikos
	Report
Penalties
Penalty scored	2–4	(penalty scored) Kritikos; (penalty scored) Parellis; (penalty scored) Valios; (penalty scored) Sofiannis

Karlovasi Municipal Stadium, Karlovasi
Referee: Pantelis Tzamoutzantonis (Chios)

=== Second round ===
The draw for this round took place on 27 August 2018.

==== Summary ====
Team 1	Score	Team 2
31 August 2019
PO Elassona	1–1 (5–3 p)	Tilikratis
1 September 2019
Thinaliakos	1–0	Apollon Efpalio
Aetos Orfano	4–2	Thermaikos
Pellana	1–0	AO Ypato
Pandramaikos	2–1 (a.e.t.)	Makedonikos Foufas
Xenophon Krestena	2–1	Doxa Arta
AE Karitsa	1–2	Panserraikos
4 September 2019
Episkopi	2–0	Ethnikos Piraeus
8 September 2019
Panthiraikos	1–0	AEEK SYNKA
15 September 2019
APO Atalanti	1–0	Atromitos Patras
2 October 2019
Aiolikos	2–0	Korinthos

==== Matches ====
31 August 2019
16:30 EEST

PO Elassona	1–1 (a.e.t.)	Tilikratis
Pepkolaj 33'	Report	Kolovos 45'
Penalties
Chamos (penalty scored); Pepkolaj (penalty scored); Petani (penalty scored); Panagiotou (penalty scored); Souglis (penalty scored)	5–3	(penalty missed) Katagis; (penalty scored) Kolovos; (penalty scored) Toska; (penalty scored) Kyvelidis; (penalty scored) Tsiantis

Elassona Municipal Stadium, Elassona
Referee: Vangelis Lathyris (Phtiotis)

1 September 2019
16:30 EEST

Thinaliakos	1–0	Apollon Efpalio
Koudas 73' (pen.)	Report

Thinaliakos Municipal Stadium, Corfu
Referee: Leonidas Tzovas (Epirus)

1 September 2019
16:30 EEST

Aetos Orfano	4–2	Thermaikos
Apostolidis 11', 79'; Doumanis 32' (pen.), 55'	Report	Mavromatis 39'; Kravvaris 84'

Ofrynio Municipal Stadium, Kavala
Referee: Vasilios Chorozoglou (Drama)

1 September 2019
16:30 EEST

Pellana	1–0	AO Ypato
Sikalopoulos 30'	Report

Sparta Municipal Stadium, Sparta
Referee: Georgios Markantonatos (Elis)

1 September 2019
16:30 EEST

Pandramaikos	2–1 (a.e.t.)	Makedonikos Foufas
Giannikis 26'; Beroukas 95'	Report	Mavromatidis 28'

Drama Municipal Stadium, Drama
Referee: Panagiotis-Rafail Tsiaras (Kavala)

1 September 2019
16:30 EEST

Xenophon Krestena	2–1	Doxa Arta
Batzakas 35'; Moutsos 56'	Report	Thanasis 37'

Krestena Municipal Stadium, Krestena
Referee: Nikolaos Chronas (Achaea)

1 September 2019
20:00 EEST

AE Karitsa	1–2	Panserraikos
Alexiou 75'	Report	Gourtsas 23' (pen.), 86'

Katerini Stadium, Katerini
Referee: Athanasios Boutsikos (Macedonia)

4 September 2019
16:30 EEST

Episkopi	2–0	Ethnikos Piraeus
Foukarakis 41'; Lima 85'	Report

Gallos Stadium, Rethymno
Referee: Marios Viskadouros (Heraklion)

8 September 2019
16:30 EEST

Panthiraikos	1–0	AEEK SYNKA
Perialis 73'	Report

Panthiraikos Municipal Stadium, Santorini
Referee: Georgios Balachoutis (Piraeus)

15 September 2019
16:00 EEST

APO Atalanti	1–0	Atromitos Patras
Tsakanikas 84'	Report

Atalanti Municipal Stadium, Atalanti
Referee: Dimitrios Psychoulas (Boeotia)

2 October 2019
15:00 EEST

Aiolikos	2–0	Korinthos
Bourous 70'; Lazaridis 90'	Report

Mytilene Municipal Stadium, Mytilene
Referee: Aristidis Aliagas (West Attica)

=== Third round ===
The draw for this round took place on 9 September 2019. A total of 24 teams are involved in the Round 3 draw: The 12 2019−20 Football League teams entering in this round, and the twelve winners of the previous round. 12 single-match fixtures were determined, of which the winners will qualify to the next Round. The majority of fixtures were held on 14, 15 and 18 September.

==== Summary ====
Team 1	Score	Team 2
14 September 2019
Aetos Orfano	2–1	Thesprotos
PO Elassona	0–1 (a.e.t.)	Enosis Aspropyrgos
15 September 2019
Episkopi	1–2	Trikala
Panthiraikos	0–0 (5–4 p)	OF Ierapetra
Thinaliakos	0–1 (a.e.t.)	Kavala
Pandramaikos	0–3	Ionikos
Xenophon Krestena	1–2	Egaleo
Panserraikos	2–0	Triglia
18 September 2019
Pellana	0–2	Ialysos
Veria	2–0	Diagoras
25 September 2019
APO Atalanti	2–3 (a.e.t.)	Olympiacos Volos
16 October 2019
Aiolikos	1–0	Niki Volos
N/A
Kalamata	bye	

==== Matches ====
14 September 2019
16:00 EEST

Aetos Orfano	2–1	Thesprotos
Servilakis 21' (o.g.); Apostolidis 62'	Report	Konstantinou 47'

Ofrynio Municipal Stadium, Ofrynio
Referee: Konstantinos Poulikidis (Drama)

14 September 2019
16:00 EEST

PO Elassona	0–1 (a.e.t.)	Enosis Aspropyrgos
	Report	Nikolakakis 103'

Elassona Municipal Stadium, Elassona
Referee: Dimitris Theocharis (Thessaly)

15 September 2019
15:00 EEST

Episkopi	1–2	Trikala
Tsirigotis 69'	Report	Aleksić 45+3' (pen.); Tsipras 67'

Theodoros Vardinogiannis Stadium, Heraklion
Referee: Georgios Patemtzis (Heraklion)

15 September 2019
16:00 EEST

Panthiraikos	0–0 (a.e.t.)	OF Ierapetra
	Report
Penalties
Kontis (penalty scored); Birbili (penalty scored); Paligeorgos (penalty scored); Manariotis (penalty scored); Lluka (penalty scored)	5–4	(penalty missed) Katsikokeris; (penalty scored) Chrysofakis; (penalty scored) Shehu; (penalty scored) Karagiannis; (penalty scored) Anastasopoulos

Panthiraikos Municipal Stadium, Santorini
Referee: Konstantinos Bairaktaris (Athens)

15 September 2019
16:00 EEST

Thinaliakos	0–1 (a.e.t.)	Kavala
	Report	Sarigiannidis 94' (o.g.)

Kerkyra Stadium, Corfu
Referee: Giannis Panos (Grevena)

15 September 2019
16:00 EEST

Pandramaikos	0–3	Ionikos
	Report	Tientcheu 13'; Kritikos 53'; Dagras 88'

Doxa Drama Stadium, Drama
Referee: Nikolaos Maropoulos (Imathia)

15 September 2019
16:00 EEST

Xenophon Krestena	1–2	Egaleo
Boutsikakis 61' (pen.)	Report	Papanikolas 83'; Petropoulos 90'

Pyrgos Municipal Stadium, Pyrgos
Referee: Panagiotis Kaddas (Achaea)

15 September 2019
20:00 EEST

Panserraikos	2–0	Triglia
Papavasiliou 25'; Gourtsas 49'	Report

Serres Municipal Stadium, Serres
Referee: Panagiotis Tsopoulidis (Xanthi)

18 September 2019
15:00 EEST

Pellana	0–2	Ialysos
	Report	Sérginho 26' (pen.); Natsiopoulos 42'

Sparta Municipal Stadium, Sparta
Referee: Athanasios Roussos (Corinth)

18 September 2019
16:00 EEST

Veria	2–0	Diagoras
Simoni 50', 59'	Report

Veria Municipal Stadium, Veria
Referee: Stavros Tsimenteridis (Kozani)

25 September 2019
16:00 EEST

APO Atalanti	2–3 (a.e.t.)	Olympiacos Volos
Chaikalis 13'; Malissovas 53'	Report	Skopelitis 10'; Koutsianikoulis 20'; Randy 118'

Atalanti Municipal Stadium, Atalanti
Referee: Andreas Gamaris (Athens)

16 October 2019
16:00 EEST

Aiolikos	1–0	Niki Volos
Sofianis 13'	Report

Mytilene Municipal Stadium, Mytilene
Referee: Konstantinos Katikos (Athens)

=== Fourth round ===
The draw for this round took place on 17 September 2019. A total of 24 teams were involved in the Round 4 draw: The 12 2019−20 Super League 2 teams entering in this round, and the twelve winners of the previous round. 12 single-match fixtures were determined, of which the winners qualified to the next Round. The majority of fixtures were held on 24, 25 and 26 September.

==== Summary ====
Team 1	Score	Team 2
24 September 2019
Ionikos	1–2	Panachaiki
Veria	3–0	Levadiakos
Trikala	1–0	Doxa Drama
25 September 2019
Egaleo	0–2	Ergotelis
Kavala	2–0	Chania
Kalamata	0–0 (4–3 p)	Karaiskakis
26 September 2019
Panthiraikos	1–2	Platanias
2 October 2019
Ialysos	1–0	Kerkyra
Aetos Orfano	0–1	Apollon Larissa
Enosis Aspropyrgos	0–2	PAS Giannina
9 October 2019
Olympiacos Volos	1–0	Apollon Pontus
23 October 2019
Aiolikos	1–0	Apollon Smyrnis
N/A
Panserraikos	bye	

==== Matches ====
24 September 2019
16:00 EEST

Ionikos	1–2	Panachaiki
Manalis 40'	Report	Moraitis 17'; Kynigopoulos 77'

Neapoli Stadium, Nikaia
Referee: Alexandros Tsakalidis (Chalkidiki)

24 September 2019
16:00 EEST

Veria	3–0	Levadiakos
Simoni 53'; Penta 61'; Pasas 71'	Report

Veria Stadium, Veria
Referee: Spyros Zabalas (Epirus)

24 September 2019
16:00 EEST

Trikala	1–0	Doxa Drama
Papageorgiou 43'	Report

Trikala Municipal Stadium, Trikala
Referee: Konstantinos Tsetsilas (Grevena)

25 September 2019
16:00 EEST

Egaleo	0–2	Ergotelis
	Report	Barata 72'; Bourselis 79'

Stavros Mavrothalassitis Stadium, Aigaleo
Referee: Panagiotis Koukoulas (Lesbos)

25 September 2019
16:00 EEST

Kavala	2–0	Chania
Gromitsaris 17' (o.g.); Katharios 31'	Report

Anthi Karagianni Stadium, Kavala
Referee: Fotis Polychronis (Pieria)

25 September 2019
16:00 EEST

Kalamata	0–0 (a.e.t.)	Karaiskakis
	Report
Penalties
Osmanagić (penalty scored); Kouiroukidis (penalty scored); Babis (penalty scored); Intzidis (penalty missed); Rakić (penalty scored)	4–3	(penalty scored) Kapias; (penalty missed) Vlachos; (penalty scored) Meçe; (penalty scored) Kyvelidis; (penalty missed) Tsoutsis

Theodoros Kolokotronis Stadium, Tripoli
Referee: Konstantinos Andrianos (Achaea)

26 September 2019
11:00 EEST

Panthiraikos	1–2	Platanias
Manariotis 26'	Report	Loukinas 45' (pen.), 75'

Panthiraikos Municipal Stadium, Santorini
Referee: Fotis Ntaoulas (West Attica)

2 October 2019
14:30 EEST

Ialysos	1–0	Kerkyra
Avgenikou 26'	Report

Municipal Stadium Ekonomideio, Ialysos
Referee: Efstratios Macheras (Athens)

2 October 2019
16:00 EEST

Aetos Orfano	0–1	Apollon Larissa
	Report	Bastakos 30'

Anthi Karagianni Stadium, Kavala
Referee: Apostolos Tzoumalakis (Serres)

2 October 2019
16:00 EEST

Enosis Aspropyrgos	0–2	PAS Giannina
	Report	Naumets 18'; Pamlidis 38'

Aspropyrgos Municipal Stadium, Aspropyrgos
Referee: Konstantinos Andrianos (Achaea)

9 October 2019
16:00 EEST

Olympiacos Volos	1–0	Apollon Pontus
Rokas 57'	Report

Alkazar Stadium, Larissa
Referee: Konstantinos Panytsidis (Kozani)

23 October 2019
16:00 EEST

Aiolikos	1–0	Apollon Smyrnis
Bourous 42' (pen.)	Report

Mytilene Municipal Stadium, Mytilene
Referee: Pantelis Tzamoutzantonis (Chios)

=== Fifth round ===
The draw for this round took place on 16 October 2019. A total of 22 teams are involved in the Round 5 draw: The 8 2019−20 Super League teams, who finished in places 6–13 in the 2018−19 season entering the competition in this round, the twelve winners of the previous round, the champion of the 2018–19 Football League (Volos), and the single club advancing on walkover in Round 4 (Panserraikos).

As of this phase onward, teams play against each other over two legs on a home-and-away basis, except for the one-match final.

In the draw for Round 5, the nine Super League teams are seeded, and the 13 clubs advancing from previous Rounds are unseeded. The seeded teams are drawn against the unseeded teams, with the seeded teams hosting the second leg. The remaining 4 unseeded clubs will be drawn against one another with the team being drawn last hosting the second leg.

A total of 11 fixtures were determined, of which the winners will qualify to the Round of 16. The first leg matches will be held on 29, 30 and 31 October, while the 2nd leg matches will be held 3, 4 and 5 December 2019.

==== Seeding ====
Seeded	Unseeded
Panionios	Panserraikos
Lamia	Panachaiki
Panathinaikos	Veria
Panetolikos	Trikala
AEL	Ergotelis
Asteras Tripolis	Kavala
Xanthi	Kalamata
OFI	Platanias
Volos	Ialysos
	Apollon Larissa
PAS Giannina
Olympiacos Volos
Aiolikos

==== Summary ====
Team 1	Agg.	Team 2	1st leg	2nd leg
Apollon Larissa	2–4	Xanthi	2–1	0–3
Panserraikos	2–2 (2–4 p)	Volos	1–1	1–1 (a.e.t.)
PAS Giannina	3–1	Veria	1–0	2–1
Olympiacos Volos	0–9	Panionios	0–3	0–6
Kalamata	3–1	AEL	3–0	0–1
Kavala	2–4	OFI	2–0	0–4
Panachaiki	1–5	Panathinaikos	1–3	0–2
Platanias	2–4	Asteras Tripolis	0–1	2–3 (a.e.t.)
Ialysos	1–9	Panetolikos	0–4	1–5
Aiolikos	0–6	Lamia	0–3	0–3
Trikala	4–2	Ergotelis	3–2	1–0

==== Matches ====
29 October 2019
15:00 EET

Apollon Larissa	2–1	Xanthi
Nazim 50'; Brebos 83'	Report	Lisgaras 45'

Filippoupoli Stadium, Larissa
Referee: Alexandros Katsikogiannis (Epirus)
4 December 2019
17:15 EET

Xanthi	3–0	Apollon Larissa
Barrientos 2'; William 42'; Sturgeon 49'	Report

Xanthi FC Arena, Xanthi
Referee: Ioannis Papadopoulos (Macedonia)

Xanthi won 4–2 on aggregate.

29 October 2019
17:15 EET

Panserraikos	1–1	Volos
Giannarakis 70'	Report	Tsaousis 90'

Serres Municipal Stadium, Serres
Referee: Georgios Vreskas (Pieria)
5 December 2019
17:15 EET

Volos	1–1 (a.e.t.)	Panserraikos
Mantzis 37'	Report	Conci 90' (pen.)
Penalties
Tsokanis (penalty scored); Chica (penalty scored); Tsaousis (penalty missed); Torres (penalty scored); Lyratzis (penalty scored)	4–2	(penalty scored) Triantafyllou; (penalty missed) Conci; (penalty scored) Kasmeridis; (penalty missed) Polyzos

Panthessaliko Stadium, Volos
Referee: Dimitris Maloutas (Imathia)

Volos won 4–2 on penalties.

29 October 2019
19:30 EET

PAS Giannina	1–0	Veria
Pamlidis 47'	Report

Zosimades Stadium, Ioannina
Referee: Meletis Gioumatzidis (Pella)
4 December 2019
19:30 EET

Veria	1–2	PAS Giannina
Melikiotis 41'	Report	Pamlidis 37'; Pilios 90+4' (pen.)

Veria Stadium, Veria
Referee: Mattheos Vournelis (Macedonia)

PAS Giannina won 3–1 on aggregate.

30 October 2019
15:00 EET

Olympiacos Volos	0–3	Panionios
	Report	Emmanouilidis 57' (pen.), 88'; Ikonomidis 64'

Alcazar Stadium, Larissa
Referee: Stathis Gortsilas (Macedonia)
4 December 2019
17:15 EET

Panionios	6–0	Olympiacos Volos
Doumtsios 2'; Tsiloulis 21', 25', 53'; Camara 73'; Papanikolaou 89'	Report

Nea Smyrni Stadium, Nea Smyrni
Referee: Alexandros Katsikogiannis (Epirus)

Panionios won 9–0 on aggregate.

30 October 2019
15:00 EET

Kalamata	3–0	AEL
Alexopoulos 39', 72', 90'	Report

Kalamata Municipal Stadium, Kalamata
Referee: Dimitris Maloutas (Imathia)
4 December 2019
19:30 EET

AEL	1–0	Kalamata
Warda 50'	Report

AEL FC Arena, Larissa
Referee: Stathis Gortsilas (Macedonia)

Kalamata won 3–1 on aggregate.

30 October 2019
17:15 EET

Kavala	2–0	OFI
Koutsoubas 6'; Papadopoulos 38'	Report

Anthi Karagianni Stadium, Kavala
Referee: Dimitrios Karantonis (Imathia)
4 December 2019
15:00 EET

OFI	4–0	Kavala
Tsilianidis 39'; Neira 51', 55'; Figueiredo 90'	Report

Theodoros Vardinogiannis Stadium, Heraklion
Referee: Stefanos Koubarakis (Thrace)

OFI won 4–2 on aggregate.

31 October 2019
15:00 EET

Platanias	0–1	Asteras Tripolis
	Report	Tasoulis 26'

Perivolia Municipal Stadium, Chania
Referee: Alexandros Tsamouris (Piraeus)
4 December 2019
15:00 EET

Asteras Tripolis	3–2 (a.e.t.)	Platanias
Iglesias 91', 102' (pen.); Fernández 120+1'	Report	Loukinas 14'; Bianconi 102'

Theodoros Kolokotronis Stadium, Tripoli
Referee: Dimitrios Karantonis (Imathia)

Asteras Tripolis won 4–2 on aggregate.

31 October 2019
15:00 EET

Ialysos	0–4	Panetolikos
	Report	Sjöstedt 20'; Dálcio 53'; Román 85'; Tahar 88'

Municipal Stadium Ekonomideio, Ialysos
Referee: Georgios Tasis (Epirus)
3 December 2019
13:45 EET

Panetolikos	5–1	Ialysos
Bajrovic 58', 73' (pen.); Biai 60'; Jovanović 85'	Report	Petavrakis 77'

Panetolikos Stadium, Agrinio
Referee: Vangelis Manouchos (Argolida)

Panetolikos won 9–1 on aggregate.

31 October 2019
17:15 EET

Aiolikos	0–3	Lamia
	Report	Romanić 15'; Tyronne 45'; Saliakas 70'

Mytilene Municipal Stadium, Mytilene
Referee: Vangelis Manouchos (Argolida)
5 December 2019
15:00 EET

Lamia	3–0	Aiolikos
Vlachomitros 13'; Vasilogiannis 16', 69'	Report

Lamia Municipal Stadium, Lamia
Referee: Vasilis Fotias (Pella)

Lamia won 6–0 on aggregate.

31 October 2019
19:30 EET

Trikala	3–2	Ergotelis
Eleftheriadis 54'; Peláez 81'; Tsipras 89'	Report	Tsipras 67' (o.g.); Iatroudis 70'

Trikala Municipal Stadium, Trikala
Referee: Athanasios Dragousis (Kilkis)
3 December 2019
17:15 EET

Ergotelis	0–1	Trikala
	Report	Vertzos 7'

Pankritio Stadium, Heraklion
Referee: Andreas Vlachos (East Attica)

Trikala won 4–2 on aggregate.

== Knockout phase ==
Each tie in the knockout phase, apart from the final, was played over two legs, with each team playing one leg at home. The team that scored more goals on aggregate over the two legs advanced to the next round. If the aggregate score was level, the away goals rule was applied, i.e. the team that scored more goals away from home over the two legs advanced. If away goals were also equal, then extra time was played. The away goals rule was again applied after extra time, i.e. if there were goals scored during extra time and the aggregate score was still level, the visiting team advanced by virtue of more away goals scored. If no goals were scored during extra time, the winners were decided by a penalty shoot-out. In the final, which were played as a single match, if the score was level at the end of normal time, extra time was played, followed by a penalty shoot-out if the score was still level.
The mechanism of the draws for each round is as follows:

- In the draw for the Round of 16, the five Super League clubs finishing in places 1–5 in the previous season are seeded, while the clubs advancing from the Fifth Round are unseeded.
  The seeded teams are drawn against the unseeded teams, with the seeded teams hosting the second leg. The remaining 6 unseeded clubs will be drawn against one another with the team being drawn last hosting the second leg.
- In the draws for the quarter-finals onwards, there are no seedings and teams from the same group can be drawn against each other.

== Bracket ==
Round of 16
1	Volos	0	2	2
16	Atromitos	3	0	3
8	Xanthi	0	1	1
9	Aris	1	2	3
5	AEK Athens	1	0	1
12	Asteras Tripolis	1	2	3
4	Panetolikos (a)	0	1	1
13	Panionios	0	1	1
6	OFI	0	1	1
11	PAOK	3	4	7
3	PAS Giannina	1	1	2
14	Panathinaikos	0	3	3
7	Trikala	0	1	1
10	Lamia	1	1	2
2	Kalamata	0	1	1
15	Olympiacos	2	4	6

Quarter-finals
Atromitos	0	0	0
Aris	0	1	1
AEK Athens	1	4	5
Panetolikos	1	0	1
PAOK	2	1	3
Panathinaikos	0	0	0
Lamia	0	2	2
Olympiacos	0	3	3

Semi-finals
Aris	1	2	3
AEK Athens (a.e.t.)	2	2	4
PAOK	3	0	3
Olympiacos	2	2	4

Final
AEK Athens	0
Olympiacos	1

== Round of 16 ==
The draw took place on 16 December 2019.

=== Seeding ===
Seeded	Unseeded
PAOK	Panetolikos
Olympiacos	Asteras Tripolis
AEK Athens	Xanthi
Atromitos	OFI
Aris	Volos
Panionios	PAS Giannina
Lamia	Trikala
Panathinaikos	Kalamata

=== Summary ===
Team 1	Agg.	Team 2	1st leg	2nd leg
Volos	2–3	Atromitos	0–3	2–0
PAS Giannina	2–3	Panathinaikos	1–0	1–3
Asteras Tripolis	1–3	AEK Athens	1–1	0–2
Kalamata	1–6	Olympiacos	0–2	1–4
OFI	1–7	PAOK	0–3	1–4
Trikala	1–2	Lamia	0–1	1–1
Xanthi	1–3	Aris	0–1	1–2
Panetolikos	1–1 (a)	Panionios	0–0	1–1 (a.e.t.)

=== Matches ===
7 January 2020
19:30 EET

Volos	0–3	Atromitos
	Report	Goutas 2'; Vellios 63', 76'

Panthessaliko Stadium, Volos
Referee: Vangelis Manouchos (Argolida)
14 January 2020
17:15 EET

Atromitos	0–2	Volos
	Report	Guarrotxena 13' (pen.), 22' (pen.)

Peristeri Stadium, Peristeri
Referee: Alexandros Tsamouris (Piraeus)

Atromitos won 3–2 on aggregate.

8 January 2020
17:15 EET

PAS Giannina	1–0	Panathinaikos
Pamlidis 28'	Report

Zosimades Stadium, Ioannina
Referee: Fotis Fotiadis (Kastoria)
15 January 2020
17:15 EET

Panathinaikos	3–1	PAS Giannina
Donis 56'; Schenkeveld 58'; Macheda 72' (pen.)	Report	Pantelakis 24'

Olympic Stadium, Marousi
Referee: Ioannis Papadopoulos (Macedonia)

Panathinaikos won 3–1 on aggregate.

16 January 2020
17:30 EET

Asteras Tripolis	1–1	AEK Athens
Crespi 20'	Report	Oliveira 33' (pen.)

Theodoros Kolokotronis Stadium, Tripoli
Referee: Stathis Gortsilas (Macedonia)
30 January 2020
19:00 EET

AEK Athens	2–0	Asteras Tripolis
Mantalos 14'; Albanis 17'	Report

Olympic Stadium, Marousi
Attendance: 4,508
Referee: Dimitris Maloutas (Imathia)

AEK Athens won 3–1 on aggregate.

8 January 2020
15:00 EET

Kalamata	0–2	Olympiacos
	Report	Ranđelović 6'; Christodoulopoulos 53'

Kalamata Municipal Stadium, Kalamata
Referee: Alexandros Katsikogiannis (Epirus)
15 January 2020
17:30 EET

Olympiacos	4–1	Kalamata
Lovera 3', 68'; Guerrero 17', 51'	Report	El Idrissi 66'

Karaiskakis Stadium, Piraeus
Referee: Aristidis Vatsios (West Attica)

Olympiacos won 6–1 on aggregate.

7 January 2020
21:30 EET

OFI	0–3	PAOK
	Report	Limnios 24'; Bisewar 32'; Akpom 64'

Theodoros Vardinogiannis Stadium, Heraklion
Referee: Athanasios Sezos (Kilkis)
15 January 2020
15:00 EET

PAOK	4–1	OFI
Lamprou 12'; Pelkas 23' (pen.), 55'; Świderski 80'	Report	Korovesis 27'

Toumba Stadium, Thessaloniki
Referee: Georgios Vreskas (Pieria)

PAOK won 7–1 on aggregate.

9 January 2020
19:30 EET

Trikala	0–1	Lamia
	Report	Romanić 51'

Trikala Municipal Stadium, Trikala
Referee: Dimitris Maloutas (Imathia)
14 January 2020
18:30 EET

Lamia	1–1	Trikala
Bianconi 11' (pen.)	Report	Pelkas 33'

Lamia Municipal Stadium, Lamia
Referee: Fotis Fotiadis (Kastoria)

Lamia won 2–1 on aggregate.

8 January 2020
20:30 EET

Xanthi	0–1	Aris
	Report	Ideye 57'

Xanthi FC Arena, Xanthi
Referee: Stefanos Koubarakis (Thrace)
14 January 2020
18:30 EET

Aris	2–1	Xanthi
Sasha 42'; Ideye 59'	Report	Faucher 22'

Kleanthis Vikelidis Stadium, Thessaloniki
Referee: Aristomenis Koutsiaftis (Arta)

Aris won 3–1 on aggregate.

8 January 2020
19:30 EET

Panetolikos	0–0	Panionios
	Report

Panetolikos Stadium, Agrinio
Referee: Alexandros Tsamouris (Piraeus)
15 January 2020
17:15 EET

Panionios	1–1 (a.e.t.)	Panetolikos
Domingues 119'	Report	Bajrovic 116'

Nea Smyrni Stadium, Nea Smyrni
Referee: Dimitris Maloutas (Imathia)

Panetolikos won on away goals.

== Quarter-finals ==
The draw took place on 23 January 2020.

=== Summary ===
Team 1	Agg.	Team 2	1st leg	2nd leg
Aris	1–0	Atromitos	0–0	1–0
Panetolikos	1–5	AEK Athens	1–1	0–4
PAOK	3–0	Panathinaikos	2–0	1–0
Lamia	2–3	Olympiacos	0–0	2–3

=== Matches ===
6 February 2020
19:00 EET

Aris	0–0	Atromitos
	Report

Kleanthis Vikelidis Stadium, Thessaloniki
Referee: Aristidis Vatsios (West Attica)
13 February 2020
19:00 EET

Atromitos	0–1	Aris
	Report	Daniel Larsson 15'

Peristeri Stadium, Peristeri
Referee: Georgios Vreskas (Pieria)

Aris won 1–0 on aggregate.

5 February 2020
17:00 EET

Panetolikos	1–1	AEK Athens
Dauda 60'	Report	Svarnas 32'

Panetolikos Stadium, Agrinio
Referee: Vangelis Manouchos (Argolida)
19 February 2020
18:15 EET

AEK Athens	4–0	Panetolikos
Oliveira 7'; Krstičić 36'; Albanis 80'; Livaja 88'	Report

Olympic Stadium, Marousi
Attendance: Behind closed doors
Referee: Petros Tsagarakis (Chania)

AEK Athens won 5–1 on aggregate.

5 February 2020
21:30 EET

PAOK	2–0	Panathinaikos
Vieirinha 34' (pen.); Varela 72'	Report

Toumba Stadium, Thessaloniki
Referee: Sandro Schärer (Switzerland)
12 February 2020
20:00 EET

Panathinaikos	0–1	PAOK
	Report	Świderski 12'

Olympic Stadium, Marousi
Referee: Michael Fabbri (Italy)

PAOK won 3–0 on aggregate.

4 February 2020
18:00 EET

Lamia	0–0	Olympiacos
	Report

Lamia Municipal Stadium, Lamia
Referee: Georgios Vreskas (Pieria)
12 February 2020
18:00 EET

Olympiacos	3–2	Lamia
Hassan 60'; Cissé 72', 77'	Report	Adejo 45'; Villalba 90' (pen.)

Karaiskakis Stadium, Piraeus
Referee: Aristomenis Koutsiaftis (Arta)

Olympiacos won 3–2 on aggregate.

== Semi-finals ==
The draw took place on 20 February 2020.

=== Summary ===
Team 1	Agg.	Team 2	1st leg	2nd leg
PAOK	3–4	Olympiacos	3–2	0–2
AEK Athens	4–3	Aris	2–1	2–2 (a.e.t.)

=== Matches ===
4 March 2020
21:30 EET

PAOK	3–2	Olympiacos
Pelkas 10', 69' (pen.); Mišić 12'	Report	Hassan 3'; Guilherme 8'

Toumba Stadium, Thessaloniki
Referee: Javier Estrada Fernández (Spain)
24 June 2020
21:30 EEST

Olympiacos	2–0	PAOK
Masouras 65'; Camara 85'	Report

Karaiskakis Stadium, Piraeus
Attendance: Behind closed doors
Referee: Bjorn Kuipers (Netherlands)

Olympiacos won 4–3 on aggregate.

4 March 2020
18:30 EET

AEK Athens	2–1	Aris
Mantalos 8'; Vranjes 57'	Report	Gama 11' (pen.)

Olympic Stadium, Marousi
Attendance: 9,142
Referee: Artur Soares Dias (Portugal)
24 June 2020
19:00 EEST

Aris	2–2 (a.e.t.)	AEK Athens
Mancini 57'; Diguiny 90+3'	Report	Livaja 90+6', 102'

Kleanthis Vikelidis Stadium, Thessaloniki
Attendance: Behind closed doors
Referee: Danny Makkelie (Netherlands)

AEK Athens won 4–3 on aggregate.

== Final ==
12 September 2020
21:00 EEST

AEK Athens	0–1	Olympiacos
	Report	Ranđelović 9'

Panthessaliko Stadium, Volos
Attendance: Behind closed doors
Referee: Björn Kuipers (Netherlands)

== Top scorers ==
Rank	Player	Club	Goals
1	(Greece) Dimitrios Pelkas	PAOK	4
1	(Greece) Georgios Pamlidis	PAS Giannina	4
3	(Greece) Christos Alexiou	Karitsa	3
3	(Albania) Alberto Simoni	Veria	3
3	(Greece) Giannis Loukinas	Platanias	3
3	(Greece) Gavriil Apostolidis	Aetos Orfano	3
3	(Greece) Sotiris Tsiloulis	Panionios	3
3	(Greece) Dimitris Gourtsas	Panserraikos	3
3	(Greece) Georgios Papavasiliou	Panserraikos	3
3	(Sweden) Admir Bajrovic	Panetolikos	3
3	(Greece) Vangelis Alexopoulos	Kalamata	3
3	(Croatia) Marko Livaja	AEK Athens	3
