= 2020–21 Gamma Ethniki =

Gamma Ethniki
- Season: 2020–21
- Dates: 11 October 2020 – 11 July 2021

The 2020–21 Gamma Ethniki was the 38th season since the official establishment of the championship in 1983, but the 2nd season as the fourth tier of the Greek Football. It started on 11 October 2020 but put on hold from the Greek government due to the COVID-19 pandemic on 1 November 2020. It restarted on 11 April 2021, with the group stage being completed after its first round. The champions of each group then qualified for a playoff round, to determine which four teams would be promoted to 2021–22 Super League 2.

136 teams were divided into ten groups according to geographical criteria.

Doxa Kato Kamila, Souli Paramythia, Thinaliakos, AO Anatoli, PAS Kithairon Kaparelli, Sparti and Panakrotiriakos withdrew from the league before the group draw.

== Group 1 ==
=== Teams ===
Location of teams in Group 1 of 2020-21 Gamma Ethniki

Team	Location	Last season
Nestos Chrysoupoli	Chrysoupoli	Group 1, 2nd
Apollon Paralimnio	Paralimnio	Group 1, 3rd
Aetos Orfano	Ofrynio	Group 1, 4th
Pandramaikos	Drama	Group 1, 5th
Aris Avato	Avato	Group 1, 6th
Alexandroupoli	Alexandroupoli	Group 1, 8th
Orfeas Xanthi	Xanthi	Group 1, 9th
A.E. Didymoteicho	Didymoteicho	Evros FCA Champion
Doxa Neo Sidirochori	Neo Sidirochori	Thrace FCA Champion
Elpis Sapes	Sapes	Thrace FCA 2nd
Anagennisi Thalassia	Thalassia	Xanthi FCA champion
Megas Alexandros Orfani	Orfani	Kavala FCA champion
A.E. Ampelokipi Drama	Drama (Ampelokipi neighborhood)	Drama FCA champion
Ethnikos Sochos	Sochos	Macedonia FCA Champion
A.E. Evosmos	Evosmos	Macedonia FCA 3rd
Iraklis (Note: Participated as successor club A.S. Iraklis Ampelokipon.)	Thessaloniki	Macedonia FCA 4th (Note: Promoted as A.S. Iraklis Ampelokipon before the agreement with G.S. Iraklis Thessalonikis.)

=== Standings ===
Pos	Team	Pld	W	D	L	GF	GA	GD	Pts	Promotion or relegation
1	Orfeas Xanthi (C, Q)	15	11	2	2	27	11	+16	35	Qualification to Play-offs
2	Iraklis	15	10	3	2	32	7	+25	33	
3	Aetos Orfano (R)	15	8	4	3	27	11	+16	28	Relegation to FCA championships
4	Pandramaikos	15	8	2	5	20	13	+7	26	
5	Alexandroupoli	15	7	4	4	22	16	+6	25	
6	Apollon Paralimnio	15	7	3	5	18	13	+5	24	
7	Nestos Chrysoupoli	15	6	6	3	15	9	+6	24	
8	Megas Alexandros Orfani	15	7	1	7	18	22	−4	22	
9	Aris Avato	15	6	3	6	20	12	+8	21	
10	Ethnikos Sochos	15	4	8	3	18	13	+5	20	
11	A.E. Evosmos (R)	15	5	5	5	16	18	−2	20	Relegation to FCA championships
12	Elpis Sapes (R)	15	5	4	6	16	18	−2	19	Relegation to FCA championships
13	A.E. Ampelokipi Drama (R)	15	5	2	8	18	29	−11	17	Relegation to FCA championships
14	A.E. Didymoteicho (R)	15	5	1	9	17	21	−4	16	Relegation to FCA championships
15	Anagennisi Thalassia (R)	15	2	0	13	9	38	−29	6	Relegation to FCA championships
16	Doxa Neo Sidirochori (R)	15	0	0	15	2	44	−42	0	Relegation to FCA championships

Source: Hellenic Football Federation (in Greek)
Rules for classification: 1) points; 2) head-to-head points; 3) head-to-head goal difference.
(C) Champions; (Q) Qualified for the phase indicated; (R) Relegated

== Group 2 ==
=== Teams ===
Location of teams in Group 2 of 2020-21 Gamma Ethniki

Team	Location	Last season
Poseidon Michaniona	Michaniona	Group 2, 2nd
Anagennisi Giannitsa	Giannitsa	Group 2, 3rd
Makedonikos	Efkarpia	Group 2, 4th
Edessaikos	Edessa	Group 2, 5th
Thermaikos	Thermi	Group 2, 6th
Thyella Sarakinoi	Sarakinoi	Group 2, 7th
Agrotikos Asteras	Evosmos	Group 2, 8th
Megas Alexandros Trikala	Langadas	Group 2, 9th
Nea Kallikrateia	Kallikrateia	Group 2, 10th
Niki Agathia	Agkathia	Group 2, 11th
PAO Koufalia	Koufalia	Macedonia FCA 2nd
Ethnikos Giannitsa	Giannitsa	Pella FCA champion
Aetos Varvara	Varvara	Chalkidiki FCA Champion
PAOK Alexandreia	Alexandreia	Imathia FCA champion
Anagennisi Plagia	Plagia	Kilkis FCA champion

=== Standings ===
Pos	Team	Pld	W	D	L	GF	GA	GD	Pts	Promotion or relegation
1	Poseidon Michaniona (C, Q)	14	12	2	0	27	6	+21	38	Qualification to Play-offs
2	Thyella Sarakinoi	14	8	2	4	23	15	+8	26	
3	Thermaikos	14	8	1	5	24	18	+6	25	
4	Agrotikos Asteras	14	8	1	5	23	21	+2	25	
5	Makedonikos	14	6	6	2	27	10	+17	24	
6	Anagennisi Giannitsa	14	7	1	6	23	15	+8	22	
7	Anagennisi Plagia	14	6	4	4	20	12	+8	22	
8	Megas Alexandros Trikala	14	6	3	5	20	18	+2	21	
9	Edessaikos	14	6	3	5	16	19	−3	21	
10	Niki Agathia (R)	14	6	2	6	15	16	−1	20	Relegation to FCA championships
11	Nea Kallikrateia (R)	14	4	3	7	15	20	−5	15	Relegation to FCA championships
12	Aetos Varvara (R)	14	4	2	8	21	27	−6	14	Relegation to FCA championships
13	Ethnikos Giannitsa (R)	14	3	2	9	17	26	−9	11	Relegation to FCA championships
14	PAO Koufalia (R)	14	1	5	8	8	22	−14	8	Relegation to FCA championships
15	PAOK Alexandreia (R)	14	1	1	12	11	45	−34	4	Relegation to FCA championships

Source: Hellenic Football Federation (in Greek)
Rules for classification: 1) points; 2) head-to-head points; 3) head-to-head goal difference.
(C) Champions; (Q) Qualified for the phase indicated; (R) Relegated

== Group 3 ==
=== Teams ===
Location of teams in Group 3 of 2020-21 Gamma Ethniki

Team	Location	Last season
A.E. Karitsa	Karitsa	Group 3, 3rd
Iraklis Larissa	Larissa	Group 3, 4th
Atromitos Palamas	Palamas	Group 3, 5th
AO Sellana	Sellana	Group 3, 7th
Meteora	Meteora	Group 3, 10th
Oikonomos Tsaritsani	Tsaritsani	Group 3, 11th
Dias Dion	Dion	Group 3, 12th
Makedonikos Foufas	Foufas	Group 4, 9th
Ethnikos Neo Keramidi	Neo Keramidi	Pieria FCA champion
Anagennisi Karditsa	Karditsa	Karditsa FCA champion
Aetos Makrychori	Makrychori	Larissa FCA champion
P.O. Elassona	Elassona	Larissa FCA 2nd
P.O. Fiki	Fiki	Trikala FCA champion
Ermis Amyntaio	Amyntaio	Florina FCA champion
Kozani	Kozani	Kozani FCA champion

=== Standings ===
Pos	Team	Pld	W	D	L	GF	GA	GD	Pts	Promotion or relegation
1	Anagennisi Karditsa (C, Q)	14	12	2	0	40	5	+35	38	Qualification to Play-offs
2	A.E. Karitsa (R)	14	11	2	1	28	7	+21	35	Relegation to FCA championships
3	Ethnikos Neo Keramidi	14	8	1	5	16	17	−1	25	
4	Aetos Makrychori	14	7	3	4	24	11	+13	24	
5	Kozani	14	6	5	3	17	15	+2	23	
6	Atromitos Palamas	14	6	4	4	17	14	+3	22	
7	Iraklis Larissa	14	6	2	6	23	15	+8	20	
8	P.O. Fiki	14	6	2	6	22	17	+5	20	
9	P.O. Elassona	14	5	4	5	16	16	0	19	
10	AO Sellana (R)	14	5	1	8	15	15	0	16	Relegation to FCA championships
11	Dias Dion (R)	14	3	4	7	11	23	−12	13	Relegation to FCA championships
12	Ermis Amyntaio (R)	14	3	3	8	12	36	−24	12	Relegation to FCA championships
13	Meteora (R)	14	2	4	8	10	24	−14	10	Relegation to FCA championships
14	Oikonomos Tsaritsani (R)	14	2	3	9	14	29	−15	9	Relegation to FCA championships
15	Makedonikos Foufas (R)	14	3	0	11	12	33	−21	9	Relegation to FCA championships

Source: Hellenic Football Federation (in Greek)
Rules for classification: 1) points; 2) head-to-head points; 3) head-to-head goal difference.
(C) Champions; (Q) Qualified for the phase indicated; (R) Relegated

== Group 4 ==
=== Teams ===
Location of teams in Group 4 of 2020-21 Gamma Ethniki

Team	Location	Last season
Theseus Agria	Agria	Group 3, 2nd
Almyros	Almyros	Group 3, 6th
A.P.O. Atalanti	Atalanti	Group 3, 8th
Diagoras Stefanovikeio	Stefanovikeio	Group 3, 9th
AO Ypato	Ypato	Group 6, 3rd
AO Nea Artaki	Nea Artaki	Group 6, 9th
Opountios	Martino	Phthiotis FCA champion
Amvrysseas	Distomo	Boeotia FCA champion
Iraklis Psachna	Psachna	Euboea FCA champion
Fokikos	Amfissa	Phocis FCA champion
Dimitra Efxeinoupoli	Efxeinoupoli	Thessaly FCA champion

=== Standings ===
Pos	Team	Pld	W	D	L	GF	GA	GD	Pts	Promotion or relegation
1	Diagoras Stefanovikeio (C, Q)	10	6	2	2	20	8	+12	20	Qualification to Play-offs
2	Iraklis Psachna (R)	10	6	2	2	17	9	+8	20	Relegation to FCA championships
3	AO Ypato	10	4	6	0	11	3	+8	18	
4	AO Nea Artaki	10	4	4	2	15	10	+5	16	
5	Amvrysseas	10	4	2	4	8	11	−3	14	
6	Dimitra Efxeinoupoli	10	3	4	3	8	7	+1	13	
7	Theseus Agria	10	2	6	2	14	13	+1	12	
8	A.P.O. Atalanti	10	3	2	5	15	15	0	11	
9	Fokikos (R)	10	3	2	5	9	14	−5	11	Relegation to FCA championships
10	Almyros (R)	10	2	4	4	7	10	−3	10	Relegation to FCA championships
11	Opountios (R)	10	1	0	9	1	25	−24	3	Relegation to FCA championships

Source: Hellenic Football Federation (in Greek)
Rules for classification: 1) points; 2) head-to-head points; 3) head-to-head goal difference.
(C) Champions; (Q) Qualified for the phase indicated; (R) Relegated

== Group 5 ==
=== Teams ===
Location of teams in Group 5 of 2020-21 Gamma Ethniki

Team	Location	Last season
Kerkyra	Corfu	SL2 11th
Anagennisi Arta	Arta	Group 4, 2nd
PAS Acheron Kanallaki	Kanallaki	Group 4, 3rd
Tilikratis	Lefkada	Group 4, 5th
AE Messolonghi	Messolonghi	Group 4, 7th
A.E. Lefkimmi	Lefkimmi	Group 4, 10th
PAS Preveza	Igoumenitsa	Group 4, 11th
O.F.A.M.	Ágios Matthaíos	Kerkyra FCA champion
Thyella Katsikas	Katsikas	Epirus FCA champion
Amvrakikos Loutro	Loutro	Aetoloacarnania FCA champion
Panagriniakos	Agrinio	Aetoloacarnania FCA 2nd
Pas Thyella 2015	Monastiraki	Preveza-Lefkada FCA champion
Asteras Kalirachi	Kalirachi	Grevena FCA champion
Megas Alexandros Kallithea	Kastoria (Kallithea neighborhood)	Kastoria FCA champion

=== Standings ===
Pos	Team	Pld	W	D	L	GF	GA	GD	Pts	Promotion or relegation
1	PAS Acheron Kanallaki (C, Q)	13	11	1	1	31	7	+24	34	Qualification to Play-offs
2	A.E. Lefkimmi	13	8	4	1	18	7	+11	28	
3	Tilikratis	13	8	2	3	19	8	+11	26	
4	Asteras Kalirachi	13	6	3	4	20	11	+9	21	
5	O.F.A.M.	13	6	2	5	14	17	−3	20	
6	Panagriniakos	13	5	4	4	16	12	+4	19	
7	Anagennisi Arta	13	5	3	5	12	11	+1	18	
8	Amvrakikos Loutro	13	5	3	5	9	10	−1	18	
9	Thyella Katsikas (R)	13	4	3	6	10	19	−9	15	Relegation to FCA championships
10	Megas Alexandros Kallithea (R)	13	4	2	7	12	16	−4	14	Relegation to FCA championships
11	Kerkyra (R)	13	4	1	8	11	25	−14	13	Relegation to FCA championships
12	AE Messolonghi (R)	13	3	2	8	6	17	−11	11	Relegation to FCA championships
13	PAS Preveza (Note: PAS Preveza has 3 points deducted, from the HFF.) (R)	13	2	6	5	9	13	−4	9	Relegation to FCA championships
14	Pas Thyella 2015 (R)	13	1	2	10	15	29	−14	5	Relegation to FCA championships

Source: Hellenic Football Federation (in Greek)
Rules for classification: 1) points; 2) head-to-head points; 3) head-to-head goal difference.
(C) Champions; (Q) Qualified for the phase indicated; (R) Relegated

== Group 6 ==
=== Teams ===
Location of teams in Group 6 of 2019-20 Gamma Ethniki

Team	Location	Last season
Panionios	Nea Smyrni	SL, 16th
Fostiras	Tavros	Group 5, 3rd
AE Moschato	Moschato	Group 5, 7th
Ethnikos Piraeus	Piraeus	Group 5, 8th
Mykonos	Mykonos	Group 5, 10th as AS Ano Mera Mykonos
Marko	Markopoulo	Group 6, 2nd
Aittitos Spata	Spata	Group 6, 5th
Pannaxiakos	Naxos	Cyclades FCA champion
Proodeftiki	Moschato	Piraeus FCA champion
Charavgiakos	Ilioupoli	Athens FCA champion
Ilioupoli	Ilioupoli	Athens FCA 2nd

=== Standings ===
Pos	Team	Pld	W	D	L	GF	GA	GD	Pts	Promotion or relegation
1	Panionios (C, Q)	10	8	2	0	20	7	+13	26	Qualification to play-offs
2	Ilioupoli	10	8	1	1	21	9	+12	25	
3	Charavgiakos	10	5	2	3	17	14	+3	17	
4	Proodeftiki	10	5	1	4	12	10	+2	16	
5	Fostiras	10	5	0	5	13	12	+1	15	
6	Ethnikos Piraeus	10	3	2	5	10	13	−3	11	
7	Mykonos	10	3	1	6	10	12	−2	10	
8	Aittitos Spata	10	2	4	4	6	9	−3	10	
9	Moschato (R)	10	2	3	5	8	17	−9	9	Relegation to FCA championships
10	Marko (R)	10	2	3	5	6	13	−7	9	Relegation to FCA championships
11	Pannaxiakos (R)	10	2	1	7	8	15	−7	7	Relegation to FCA championships

Source: Hellenic Football Federation (in Greek)
Rules for classification: 1) points; 2) head-to-head points; 3) head-to-head goal difference.
(C) Champions; (Q) Qualified for the phase indicated; (R) Relegated

== Group 7 ==
=== Teams ===
Location of teams in Group 7 of 2019-20 Gamma Ethniki

Team	Location	Last season
Agios Ierotheos	Peristeri	Group 5, 4th
A.E. Kifisia	Kifisia	Group 5, 5th
Panarkadikos	Tripoli	Group 6, 4th
Nafplio 2017	Nafplio	Group 7, 3rd
Enosi Ermionida	Kranidi	Group 7, 5th
Pangytheatikos	Gytheio	Group 7, 11th
P.A.O. Rouf	Rouf	Athens FCA champion Group B
Ermis Meligou	Meligou	Arcadia FCA champion
Aris Skala	Skala	Laconia FCA champion
OFM Molaikos	Molaoi	Laconia FCA 3rd
Atromitos Chiliomodi	Chiliomodi	Corinthia FCA champion
Koronida Koilada	Koilada	Argolis FCA champion
Foinikas Nea Epidavros	Nea Epidavros	Argolis FCA 2nd

=== Standings ===
Pos	Team	Pld	W	D	L	GF	GA	GD	Pts	Promotion or relegation
1	A.E. Kifisia (C, Q)	12	11	0	1	28	5	+23	33	Qualification to Play-offs
2	P.A.O. Rouf	12	8	1	3	19	9	+10	25	
3	Agios Ierotheos	12	6	3	3	19	10	+9	21	
4	Enosi Ermionida	12	5	5	2	16	10	+6	20	
5	Panarkadikos	12	5	2	5	8	9	−1	17	
6	Aris Skala	12	3	7	2	10	11	−1	16	
7	Ermis Meligou	12	4	3	5	9	11	−2	15	
8	Foinikas Nea Epidavros	12	4	3	5	10	16	−6	15	
9	Pangytheatikos (R)	12	4	2	6	15	10	+5	14	Relegation to FCA championships
10	O.F.M. Molaikos (R)	12	3	5	4	10	14	−4	14	Relegation to FCA championships
11	Atromitos Chiliomodi (R)	12	2	2	8	9	25	−16	8	Relegation to FCA championships
12	Koronida Koilada (R)	12	1	4	7	9	18	−9	7	Relegation to FCA championships
13	Nafplio 2017 (R)	12	1	4	7	8	22	−14	7	Relegation to FCA championships

Source: Hellenic Football Federation (in Greek)
Rules for classification: 1) points; 2) head-to-head points; 3) head-to-head goal difference.
(C) Champions; (Q) Qualified for the phase indicated; (R) Relegated

== Group 8 ==
=== Teams ===
Location of teams in Group 8 of 2019-20 Gamma Ethniki

Team	Location	Last season
Keratsini	Keratsini	Group 5, 9th
Akratitos	Ano Liosia	Group 5, 11th
Thyella Rafina	Rafina (Diastavrosi neighborhood)	Group 6, 6th
Aiolikos	Mytilene	Group 6, 7th
Kyanos Asteras Vari	Vari	East Attica FCA champion
Aias Salamina	Salamina	Piraeus FCA champion Group B
A.O. Karavas	Piraeus (Karavas neighborhood)	Piraeus FCA 2nd Group B
Panelefsiniakos	Eleusis	West Attica FCA champion
A.O. Pyli Kos	Pyli	Dodecanese FCA champion
Aetos Loutra	Loutra	Lesbos FCA champion
A.PS.E.S. Pythagoras	Kontakeika	Samos FCA champion
A.P.E. Mikrasiatiki	Chios	Chios FCA champion

=== Standings ===
Pos	Team	Pld	W	D	L	GF	GA	GD	Pts	Promotion or relegation
1	Thyella Rafina (C, Q)	11	7	4	0	24	6	+18	25	Qualification to Play-offs
2	Aiolikos	11	8	1	2	17	6	+11	25	
3	A.O. Pyli Kos	11	6	1	4	13	8	+5	19	
4	A.O. Karavas	11	5	3	3	16	10	+6	18	
5	Aias Salamina	11	5	3	3	15	8	+7	18	
6	Kyanos Asteras Vari	11	4	5	2	18	9	+9	17	
7	Panelefsiniakos	11	5	1	5	20	14	+6	16	
8	Keratsini	11	4	2	5	11	13	−2	14	
9	Akratitos (R)	11	3	3	5	12	16	−4	12	Relegation to FCA championships
10	Aetos Loutra (R)	11	1	6	4	10	20	−10	9	Relegation to FCA championships
11	A.P.E. Mikrasiatiki (R)	11	1	3	7	5	21	−16	6	Relegation to FCA championships
12	A.PS.E.S. Pythagoras (R)	11	0	2	9	12	42	−30	2	Relegation to FCA championships

Source: Hellenic Football Federation (in Greek)
Rules for classification: 1) points; 2) head-to-head points; 3) head-to-head goal difference.
(C) Champions; (Q) Qualified for the phase indicated; (R) Relegated

== Group 9 ==
=== Teams ===
Location of teams in Group 9 of 2020-21 Gamma Ethniki

Team	Location	Last season
Nafpaktiakos Asteras	Nafpaktos	Group 4, 12th
Zakynthos	Zakynthos	Group 7, 4th
PAO Varda	Varda	Group 7, 6th
A.O. Tsilivi	Planos	Group 7, 7th
A.O. Diavolitsi	Diavolitsi	Group 7, 8th
Thyella Patras	Patras	Group 7, 9th
Diagoras Vrachnaiika	Vrachnaiika	Group 7, 10th
Aias Gastouni	Gastouni	Elis FCA champion
Pamisos Messini	Messini	Messinia FCA champion
Ethnikos Skoulikado	Skoulikado	Zakynthos FCA Champion
Panegialios	Aigio	Achaea FCA champion
Achaiki	Kato Achaia	Achaea FCA 2nd
Pallixouriakos	Lixouri	Kefalonia-Ithaca FCA Champion

=== Standings ===
Pos	Team	Pld	W	D	L	GF	GA	GD	Pts	Promotion or relegation
1	Zakynthos (C, Q)	12	7	5	0	18	9	+9	26	Qualification to Play-offs
2	Diagoras Vrachnaiika	12	7	2	3	16	10	+6	23	
3	Aias Gastouni	12	6	4	2	21	12	+9	22	
4	Panegialios	12	6	3	3	12	8	+4	21	
5	Ethnikos Skoulikado	12	6	2	4	16	12	+4	20	
6	PAO Varda	12	5	5	2	10	8	+2	20	
7	Nafpaktiakos Asteras	12	5	4	3	16	7	+9	19	
8	A.O. Diavolitsi	12	5	2	5	13	14	−1	17	
9	Achaiki (R)	12	4	5	3	8	9	−1	17	Relegation to FCA championships
10	Pamisos Messini (R)	12	3	3	6	7	10	−3	12	Relegation to FCA championships
11	Thyella Patras (R)	12	2	2	8	16	24	−8	8	Relegation to FCA championships
12	Pallixouriakos (R)	12	2	1	9	5	17	−12	7	Relegation to FCA championships
13	A.O. Tsilivi (R)	12	0	2	10	5	23	−18	2	Relegation to FCA championships

Source: Hellenic Football Federation (in Greek)
Rules for classification: 1) points; 2) head-to-head points; 3) head-to-head goal difference.
(C) Champions; (Q) Qualified for the phase indicated; (R) Relegated

== Group 10 ==
=== Teams ===
Location of teams in Group 10 of 2020-21 Gamma Ethniki

Team	Location	Last season
Platanias	Platanias	SL2, 9th
Giouchtas	Archanes	Group 8, 2nd
Irodotos	Heraklion (Nea Alikarnassos neighborhood)	Group 8, 3rd
Atsalenios	Heraklion (Atsalenio neighborhood)	Group 5, 5th
AO Agios Nikolaos	Agios Nikolaos	Group 5, 6th
AEEK SYN.KA	Chania	Group 5, 7th
AO Poros	Heraklion (Poros neighborhood)	Group 5, 8th
A.E. Neapoli	Neapoli	Lasithi FCA champion
Anagennisi Ierapetra	Ierapetra	Lasithi FCA 2nd
Neos Asteras Rethymno	Rethymno	Rethymno FCA champion
Aris Rethymno	Rethymno	Rethymno FCA 2nd
Aris Souda	Souda	Chania FCA champion
Paleochora	Palaiochora	Chania FCA 2nd
A.O. Damasta	Damasta	Heraklion FCA champion
G.P.S. Almyros Gazi	Gazi	Heraklion FCA 2nd

=== Standings ===
Pos	Team	Pld	W	D	L	GF	GA	GD	Pts	Qualification
1	Irodotos (C, Q)	15	11	3	1	30	9	+21	36	Qualification to Play-offs
2	Agios Nikolaos	15	11	1	3	31	12	+19	34	
3	Atsalenios	15	9	4	2	25	15	+10	31	
4	Almyros Gazi	15	8	4	3	35	14	+21	28	
5	AEEK SYNKA	15	8	4	3	30	14	+16	28	
6	Giouchtas	15	7	6	2	22	12	+10	27	
7	Aris Souda	15	7	3	5	23	17	+6	24	
8	Poros	15	7	2	6	17	19	−2	23	
9	Anagennisi Ierapetra	15	7	1	7	33	29	+4	22	
10	A.E. Neapoli	15	7	1	7	16	18	−2	22	
11	Rethymniakos (R)	15	7	0	8	21	20	+1	21	Relegation to FCA championships
12	Damasta (R)	15	5	3	7	20	20	0	18	Relegation to FCA championships
13	Neos Asteras Rethymno (R)	15	5	0	10	19	29	−10	15	Relegation to FCA championships
14	Paleochora (R)	14	2	0	12	6	39	−33	6	Relegation to FCA championships
15	Platanias (R)	15	1	2	12	8	29	−21	5	Relegation to FCA championships
16	Aris Rethymno (R)	14	0	0	14	1	41	−40	0	Relegation to FCA championships

Source: Hellenic Football Federation (in Greek)
Rules for classification: 1) points; 2) head-to-head points; 3) head-to-head goal difference.
(C) Champions; (Q) Qualified for the phase indicated; (R) Relegated

== Promotion Playoffs ==
=== Group 1 ===
The five champion teams from first 5 groups will meet once (4 matches per team) for two places in Super League 2.

Pos	Team	Pld	W	D	L	GF	GA	GD	Pts	Promotion or qualification	ANK	ORF	ACK	PMI	DST
1	Anagennisi Karditsa (P)	4	3	1	0	9	4	+5	10	Promotion to Super League 2	—	2–0	4–2	—	—
2	Orfeas Xanthi (Note: Orfeas Xanthi although he was promoted, he won't play in Super League 2 due to weaknesses)	4	2	1	1	4	3	+1	7		—	—	1–0	—	2–0
3	PAS Acheron Kanallaki	4	2	0	2	8	5	+3	6		—	—	—	2–0	4–0
4	Poseidon Michaniona	4	1	2	1	4	5	−1	5		1–1	1–1	—	—	—
5	Diagoras Stefanovikeio	4	0	0	4	2	10	−8	0		1–2	—	—	1–2	—

Source: Hellenic Football Federation (in Greek)
Legend: Blue = home team win; Yellow = draw; Red = away team win.
Rules for classification: 1) Points; 2) Head-to-head points (Regular season and play-off); 3) Head-to-head goal difference (Regular season and play-off); 4) Regular season position.
(P) Promoted

=== Group 2 ===
The five champion teams from group 6 to 10 will meet once (4 matches per team) for two places in Super League 2.

Pos	Team	Pld	W	D	L	GF	GA	GD	Pts	Promotion or qualification	AEK	IRO	PAN	ZAK	THY
1	A.E. Kifisia (P)	4	4	0	0	8	0	+8	12	Promotion to Super League 2	—	3–0	—	2–0	—
2	Irodotos (P)	4	2	1	1	3	3	0	7	Promotion to Super League 2	—	—	1–0	2–0	—
3	Panionios (Note: Panionios although invited by the federation, he won't play in Super League 2 due to debts.)	4	2	0	2	3	3	0	6		0–1	—	—	—	1–0
4	Zakynthos (Note: Zakynthos promoted due to vacant positions.) (P)	4	1	0	3	3	7	−4	3	Promotion to Super League 2	—	—	1–2	—	2–1
5	Thyella Rafina	4	0	1	3	1	5	−4	1		0–2	0–0	—	—	—

Source: Hellenic Football Federation (in Greek)
Legend: Blue = home team win; Yellow = draw; Red = away team win.
Rules for classification: 1) Points; 2) Head-to-head points (Regular season and play-off); 3) Head-to-head goal difference (Regular season and play-off); 4) Regular season position.
(P) Promoted
