= Apostolidis =

Apostolidis (Greek: Αποστολίδης) is a Greek surname. It is a patronymic surname which literally means "the son of Apostolos". It may refer to the following people:

- Christos Apostolidis (born 1952), Greek footballer
- Gavriil Apostolidis (born 1989), Greek footballer
- Georgios Apostolidis (born 1984), Greek basketball player
- Giannis Apostolidis (born 1988), Greek footballer
- Koulis Apostolidis (born 1946), Greek footballer
- Loukas Apostolidis (born 1980), Greek footballer
- Manolis Apostolidis (born 1983), Greek football player
- Marianne Apostolides, Canadian writer
- Renos Apostolidis (1924–2004), Greek writer, philologist and literary critic.
