= Argyris =

Argyris (Greek: Αργύρης) is a Greek name, related to the word άργυρος (argyros) meaning silver. It is used both as a given name (sometimes as a nickname for Argyrios or Anargyros) and as a surname. Notable people with the name include:

== Given name ==
- Argyris Brebos (born 1996), Greek footballer
- Argyris Chionis (1943–2011), Greek poet
- Argyris Darelas (born 2003), Greek footballer
- Argyris Kampetsis (born 1999), Greek footballer
- Argyris Karagiannis (1903–????), Greek sprinter
- Argyris Papapetrou (born 1965), Greek basketball player
- Argyris Pedoulakis (born 1964), Greek basketball player
- Argyris Samios (born 1990), Greek footballer
- Argyris Theodoropoulos (born 1981), Greek water polo player

== Surname ==
- Angelos Argyris (born 1994), Greek footballer
- Chris Argyris (1923–2013), American business theorist
- Giannis Argyris (1918–1993), Greek actor
- John Argyris (1913–2004), Greek pioneer of computer applications in science and engineering

== See also ==
- Argyris, a synonym of the moth genus Problepsis
