= List of people from Anambra State =

The following people were all born in, residents of, or are otherwise closely associated with Anambra State, Nigeria.

- Chinua Achebe, Nigerian writer known for his novel Things Fall Apart
- Chimamanda Ngozi Adichie, writer, short story writer and feminist
- Somadina Adinma, Actor and model
- Alfred Achebe, Traditional monarch who serves as Obi of Onitsha
- Pete Edochie, Veteran actor
- Rita Edochie
- Alex Ifeanyichukwu Ekwueme
- Lazarus Ekwueme
- Zubby Michael
- Chukwuedu Nwokolo
- Peter Obi
- Valerian Okeke
- Charles Soludo
- Uzoamaka Power
- Chika Ike
- Louis Aniweta
- Austin Ejide
- Caleb Ekwegwo
- Robert Eziakor
- Obum Gwacham
- Micheal Henry
- Chinamerem Igboeli
- Joshua Izuchukwu
- Maureen Mmadu
- David Nazim
- Odirah Ntephe
- Greg Nwokolo
- Alexander Nwora
- Chibuike Ohizu
- Emmanuel Okala
- Michael Onwatuegwu
- Simy
