= Diego Peláez =

Diego Peláez may refer to:

- Diego Peláez (bishop) (11th century)
- Diego Peláez (footballer) (born 1989)
