= Petros Kravaritis =

Greek footballer

Personal information
- Date of birth: 31 August 1987 (age 39)
- Place of birth: Lamia, Greece
- Height: 1.86 m (6 ft 1 in)
- Position: Goalkeeper

Youth career
- –2006: Panathinaikos

Senior career*
Years	Team	Apps	(Gls)
2006—2009	Panathinaikos	0	
2007—2009	→ Koropi (loan)	1	
2009—2010	Thrasyvoulos	1	
2010—2012	Rodos	0	
2012—2013	Kordelio	19	
2013—2014	Anagennisi Giannitsa	8	
2014	Ermionida	0	
2014—2015	Serres	20	
2015—2017	I Sparti	10	
2017—2018	Apollon Larissa	2	
2018—2019	Sparti	10	
2019—2020	Ypato	1	
2020—2021	AE Moschato	0	
2021—present	Fostiras	1	
2021—present	Panionios		
- * Club domestic league appearances and goals as of 02 November 2021

Petros Kravaritis (Greek: Πέτρος Κραβαρίτης, born 31 August 1987) is a Greek goalkeeper. He currently plays for Fostiras.

Kravaritis was part of Panathinaikos' youth team before signing on with the professional team in 2006. He didn't make an appearance that season and the club loaned him to Koropi for two years not long after. From 2009 to 2010, he was signed with Thrasyvoulos; 2010–2011, Rodos; 2012–2013, Kordelio; and 2013–2014, Anagennisi Giannitsa and Ermionida. He played for Serres from 2014 to 2015 and P.S. «I Sparti» from 2015 to 2017. He goaltended for Apollon Larissa for a reason before returning to Sparta for the 2018–2019 season. He them moved onto Ypato and AE Moschato for a year each. He currently has a one-year contract with Fostiras for the 2021–2022 season. He also played a few games for Panionios in 2021.
