= Papanikolas =

Papanikolas, Παπανικόλας is a Greek surname. Notable people with the surname include:

- Helen Z. Papanikolas (1917–2004), Greek-American ethnic historian, novelist, and folklorist
- Michalis Papanikolas (born 1993), Greek professional footballer
