= Dimitrios Magafinis =

Greek football manager

Personal information
- Full name: Dimitrios Magafinis
- Date of birth: 11 May 1968 (age 58)
- Place of birth: Thasos, Greece

Team information
- Current team: Nea Artaki (manager)

Managerial career
- Years: Team
- 2009: Zakynthos
- 2011–2012: Zakynthos
- 2012: Diagoras
- 2012–2013: Zakynthos
- 2013–2014: Korinthos
- 2014: Asteras Magoula
- 2014–2015: Orfeas Elefteroupoli
- 2015: Vyzantio Kokkinochoma
- 2015–2016: Ermionida
- 2016: Zakynthos
- 2016–2017: Nestos
- 2017–2018: Paleochora
- 2018: Lefkimmi
- 2019: Tilikratis
- 2019–2021: Aetos Orfano
- 2021–2022: Megas Alexandros Orfani
- 2021–2022: Panarkadikos
- 2022: Doxa Theologos Potos
- 2022–2023: Zakynthos
- 2023–2024: Nea Artaki
- 2024: Anagennisi Arta
- 2024–2025: Miltiadis Pyrgos Trifilia
- 2025–2026: Karystos
- 2026–: Nea Artaki

Dimitrios Magafinis (Greek: Δημήτριος Μαγκαφίνης; born 11 May 1968) is a Greek football manager.
