= Christos Albanis (footballer, born 1994) =

Greek footballer

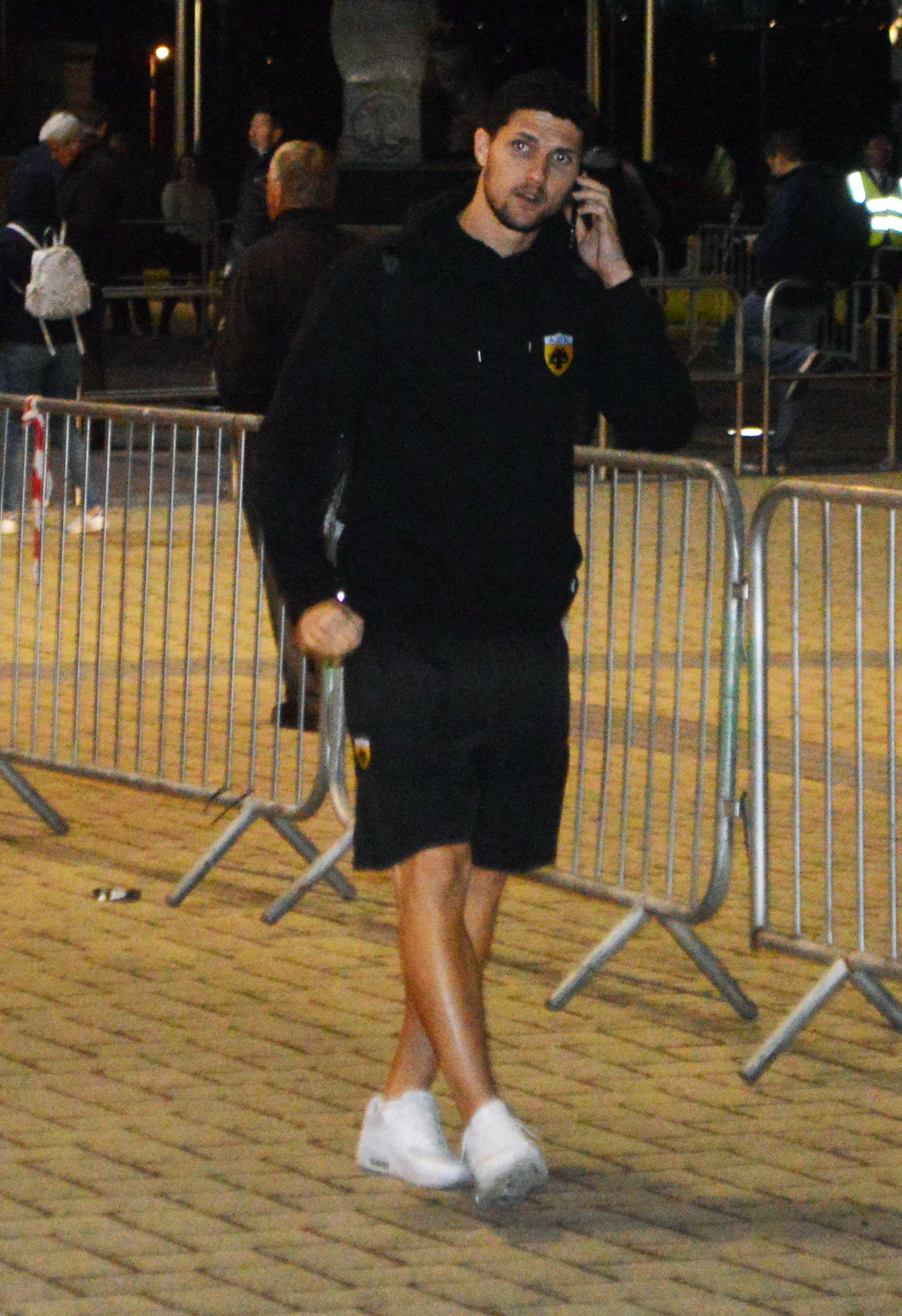
- Albanis with AEK Athens in 2018

Personal information
- Date of birth: 5 November 1994 (age 31)
- Place of birth: Kalabaka, Greece
- Height: 1.84 m (6 ft 0 in)
- Position: Winger

Team information
- Current team: AEL
- Number: 14

Youth career
- –2005: Meteora
- 2005–2010: AO Dimitra Apollon 2005
- 2010–2013: Werder Bremen
- 2013–2014: Eintracht Frankfurt
- 2014–2015: Freiburg

Senior career*
Years	Team	Apps	(Gls)
2013–2014	Eintracht Frankfurt II	20	(4)
2014–2015	SC Freiburg II	20	(4)
2015–2018	Apollon Smyrnis	63	(18)
2018–2023	AEK Athens	62	(5)
2021–2022	→ Apollon Limassol (loan)	25	(5)
2022–2023	→ Andorra (loan)	31	(4)
2023–2026	Andorra	31	(1)
2025–2026	→ Gimnàstic (loan)	16	(1)
2026–	AEL	3	(0)

International career
2011	Greece U18	2	(0)
2014–2015	Greece U20	4	(0)
2015	Greece U21	2	(0)
- * Club domestic league appearances and goals as of 21 September 2026

Christos Albanis (Greek: Χρήστος Αλμπάνης; born 5 November 1994) is a Greek professional footballer who plays as a winger for Super League 2 club AEL.

== Career ==
=== Early career ===
Born in Kalabaka, Trikala, Greece, Albanis started his career at Meteora, the team of his native town. At the age of 16 he moved to Germany, joining Werder Bremen's U17 team. He later went on to play for the club's U19 team before playing for Eintracht Frankfurt II and SC Freiburg II.

=== Apollon Smyrnis ===
On 31 August 2015, Apollon Smyrnis announced the signing of Albanis on a two-year deal. During the first season he did not get much first team action. In the 2016–17 season he was one of the most important players, as his team won the league title and gained promotion to the Super League. He scored 9 goals and provided his teammates with 6 assists. His performances attracted the interest of Super League side, Panionios, but Apollon Smyrnis' administration moved quickly and extended his contract by two additional years.

On 22 October 2017, he scored his first Super League goal in a 2–0 home win against Xanthi, which was also his first for the 2017–18 season. A week later, he scored the equalizer in a 1–1 away draw against Panetolikos. A further week later, he scored in a third successive match, a 4–3 home win against PAS Giannina. On 10 December 2017 he scored in the early minutes of the second half, but Apollon didn't avoid a 3–1 home loss. On 1 April 2018, he scored a brace in a 3–0 home win game against AEL in his club's effort to avoid relegation. On 22 April 2018, Albanis’ strike in the opening minute of a tense match at the Georgios Kamaras Stadium against champions Olympiacos was enough to seal three vital points for the home side, and are now assured of Super League next season as a result.

=== AEK Athens ===
In May 2018, Apollon Smyrnis announced the transfer of Albanis to AEK Athens. Apollon Smyrnis secured a resale rate of 20%. On 14 August 2018, he made his international debut in a 2–1 home win UEFA Champions League Third qualifying round, 2nd leg game against Celtic as a late substitute. On 17 March 2019, came off the bench to score a superb late goal which earned AEK Athens a narrow 1–0 away win over rivals Atromitos as AEK Athens cemented their grip on third place. It was his first goal with the club in all competitions.

On 22 January 2020, he scored his first goal for the season, by collecting a stray pass from an opponent in the area, and slid his effort under the goalkeeper in a 3–1 away win against Volos. On 16 February 2020, Albanis scored the only goal of the game as AEK Athens triumphed 1–0 against Aris at the Kleanthis Vikelidis Stadium in Thessaloniki, and three days later he scored in a 4–0 home Greek Cup win game against Panetolikos.

On 7 January 2021, he signed a contract extension, until the summer of 2024. On 15 February 2021, he scored in a 4–2 away win against AEL. It was his first of the season. On 18 April 2021, Albanis sealed a 3–1 home win against Asteras Tripolis.

On 1 September 2021, Apollon Limassol announces the agreement with AEK for the transfer on a long-season loan until May 2022.

=== Andorra ===
On 1 September 2022, Albanis switched teams and countries again after agreeing to a one-year loan deal with Segunda División side FC Andorra. The following 3 February, he agreed to join the club on a permanent two-year deal, effective the following July; AEK also retained 40% over a future sale.

In July 2023, however, Albanis suffered a knee injury which sidelined him for the first half of the season, which ended in relegation. On 6 July 2024, he renewed his contract until 2027.

On 22 August 2025, Albanis was loaned to Primera Federación club Gimnàstic de Tarragona, for one year.

=== AEL ===
On 5 August 2026, Albanis signed for AEL on a free transfer.

== Career statistics ==
As of 27 May 2024

Appearances and goals by club, season and competition
Club	Season	League			National cup (Note: Includes Greek Cup, Cypriot Cup, Copa del Rey)		Europe		Total	
Club	Season	Division	Apps	Goals	Apps	Goals	Apps	Goals	Apps	Goals
Eintracht Frankfurt II	2013–14	Regionalliga Südwest	20	4	—		—		20	4
SC Freiburg II	2014–15	Regionalliga Südwest	20	4	—		—		0	4
Apollon Smyrnis	2015–16	Super League Greece 2	7	1	1	0	—		8	1
Apollon Smyrnis	2016–17	Super League Greece 2	27	9	2	0	—		29	9
Apollon Smyrnis	2017–18	Super League Greece	29	8	2	0	—		31	8
Apollon Smyrnis	Total		63	18	5	0	—		68	18
AEK Athens	2018–19	Super League Greece	13	1	3	0	1	0	17	1
AEK Athens	2019–20	Super League Greece	26	2	6	2	0	0	32	4
AEK Athens	2020–21	Super League Greece	22	2	5	0	2	0	29	2
AEK Athens	2021–22	Super League Greece	0	0	0	0	2	0	2	0
AEK Athens	2022–23	Super League Greece	1	0	0	0	0	0	1	0
AEK Athens	Total		62	5	14	2	5	0	81	7
Apollon Limassol (loan)	2021–22	Cypriot First Division	25	5	2	0	—		27	5
Andorra (loan)	2022–23	Segunda División	31	4	1	0	—		32	4
Andorra	2023–24	Segunda División	2	0	0	0	—		2	0
Career total			223	40	22	2	5	0	249	42

== Honours ==
Apollon Limassol

- Cypriot First Division: 2021–22
