= Koutsopoulos =

Koutsopoulos is a Greek surname. People with this name include:

- Dimitrios Koutsopoulos (born 1978), Greek footballer
- Dušan Jelic Koutsopoulos (born 1974), Serbian-Greek former basketball player
- Vangelis Koutsopoulos (born 1980), Greek footballer
