= Konstantinos Banousis =

Greek footballer (born 1988)

Kostas Banousis
Personal information
- Full name: Konstantinos Banousis
- Date of birth: 23 January 1988 (age 38)
- Place of birth: Elassona, Greece
- Height: 1.83 m (6 ft 0 in)
- Position: Defensive midfielder

Youth career
- –2008: AEL

Senior career*
Years	Team	Apps	(Gls)
2008–2009	AEL	0	(0)
2009	→ Chaidari (loan)	13	(2)
2009–2010	→ Pyrsos Grevena (loan)	22	(2)
2010–2011	Eordaikos	21	(2)
2011–2012	Oikonomos Tsaritsani	25	(10)
2012–2015	OFI	42	(0)
2015–2016	AEL	37	(1)
2016–2017	Sparta	26	(0)
2017–2018	Asteras Amaliada	21	(1)
2018–2019	Ermis Aradippou	17	(0)
2019–2020	PS Sparti		
2020–2021	A.E. Mykonos		
2021–2022	Aias Salamina		
2022–2023	Aspropyrgos		
2023–2024	Elassona		
- * Club domestic league appearances and goals as of 10:46, 18 May 2019

Konstantinos Banousis (Greek: Κωνσταντίνος Μπανούσης; born 23 January 1988) is a Greek footballer who plays as a midfielder.

== Career ==
He began his career from the youth team of AEL, and in 2009 he was given on loan to Haidari and in the next season to Pyrsos Grevena. He has also played for Eordaikos 2007, and for Oikonomos Tsaritsani, (teams of lower National Categories), until 6 August 2012, when he made the major step to Greek Super League signing for OFI. He competed with the Cretan club for almost 2,5 years. After the dissolution of the team due to major financial problems, he freed himself from his professional contract and on 20 January 2015 he signed with AEL.
