= Niki Agathia F.C. =

Greek football club

Niki Agathia
- Founded: 1966; 60 years ago
- Ground: Agathia Municipal Stadium
- Chairman: Dimitrios Matsoukas
- Manager: Stavros Kostoglidis
- League: Imathia FCA
- 2020–21: Gamma Ethniki, 10th (relegated)

Niki Agathia Football Club (Greek: Νίκη Αγκαθιάς) is a Greek football club based in Agathia, Imathia, Greece.

== Honours ==
=== Domestic ===
  - Imathia FCA champion: 4
    - 1991–92, 1994–95, 2007–08, 2017–18
  - Imathia FCA Cup Winners : 2
    - 1993–94, 1996–97
