= Sotiris Chamos =

Greek professional footballer

Personal information
- Full name: Sotiriοs Chamos
- Date of birth: 15 December 1993 (age 32)
- Place of birth: Elassona, Greece
- Height: 1.87 m (6 ft 1 1/2 in)
- Position: Attacking midfielder

Team information
- Current team: Hellas München

Youth career
- 2011: PO Elassona

Senior career*
| Years | Team | Apps | (Gls) |
| 2011–2012 | PO Elassona | 0 | (0) |
| 2012–2013 | Niki Volos | 2 | (0) |
| 2013 | Tilikratis | 7 | (0) |
| 2013–2015 | Oikonomos Tsaritsani | 27 | (8) |
| 2015–2016 | AEL | 0 | (0) |
| 2016 | → Pydna Kitros (loan) | | |
| 2016–2019 | Oikonomos Tsaritsani | | |
| 2019–2020 | PO Elassona | | |
| 2020– | Hellas München | | |
- * Club domestic league appearances and goals as of 8 July 2016

Sotiris Chamos (Greek: Σωτήρης Χάμος; born 15 December 1993) is a Greek professional footballer who plays as a midfielder for Hellas München.

== Career ==
Chamos was born on December 15, 1993, in Elassona, a town and a municipality in the Larissa regional unit in Greece. He began his career from the youth team of his hometown, PO Elassona. He has also played for Niki Volos, Tilikratis and for Oikonomos Tsaritsani, (teams of lower National Categories), until August 2015, when he made a major step to his career signing for AEL, under the recommendation of his coach Ratko Dostanić. On 1 February 2016 Chamos was given on loan to Gamma Ethniki club Pydna Kitros until the end of the season.
