= Manolis Apostolidis =

Greek footballer (born 1983)

Personal information
- Full name: Emmanouil Ioannis Apostolidis
- Date of birth: 17 December 1983 (age 42)
- Place of birth: Kavala, Greece
- Height: 1.86 m (6 ft 1 in)
- Position: Goalkeeper

Youth career
- 2002: Kavala

Senior career*
Years	Team	Apps	(Gls)
2003–2009	Kavala	61	(0)
2009–2010	→ Thermaikos (loan)	11	(0)
2010–2011	Kavala	0	(0)
2011–2012	Panthrakikos	0	(0)
2012–2013	Kavala	32	(0)
2013–2014	Niki Volos	40	(0)
2014–2015	AEL	33	(0)
2015–2016	Apollon Smyrnis	15	(0)
2016–2017	Agrotikos Asteras	11	(0)
2017–2018	Trikala	37	(0)
2018–2020	Niki Volos	25	(0)
2020–2021	Diagoras Stefanovikeio	24	(0)
2021–2022	Niki Volos	16	(0)
- * Club domestic league appearances and goals as of 11 July 2021 (UTC)

Manolis Apostolidis (Greek: Μανώλης Αποστολίδης; born 17 December 1983) is a Greek former professional footballer who played as a goalkeeper.

== Career ==
Apostolidis comes from Kavala, and has started his professional career in his hometown team AOK. He has also played for Panthrakikos, Thermaikos, and for the Thessalian club Niki Volos. He signed for AEL on 22 June 2014.
