= Dimitrios Koutsopoulos =

Greek footballer

Dimitris Koutsopoulos
Personal information
- Date of birth: 20 April 1978 (age 48)
- Place of birth: Karditsa, Greece
- Height: 1.80 m (5 ft 11 in)
- Position: Goalkeeper

Team information
- Current team: AO Sellana

Senior career*
Years	Team	Apps	(Gls)
1996–1997	Paniliakos	1	(0)
1997–1998	FAS Naoussa	23	(0)
1998–2000	Anagennisi Karditsa	62	(0)
2001	Paniliakos F.C.	0	(0)
2001–2003	Leonidio	60	(0)
2003–2004	Paniliakos F.C.	8	(0)
2004–2008	Messiniakos F.C.	61	(0)
2008–2009	Apollon Kalamarias	34	(0)
2009–2010	Anagennisi Karditsa	18	(0)
2010–2014	Panthrakikos	75	(0)
2014–2015	Apollon Smyrnis	7	(0)
2015–2017	Anagennisi Karditsa	57	(0)
2017–	AO Sellana	0	(0)
- * Club domestic league appearances and goals as of 20 January 2019

Dimitris Koutsopoulos (Greek: Δημήτριος Κουτσόπουλος; born 20 April 1978) is a Greek footballer. He currently plays for AO Sellana.

== Career ==
His skills induced him to sign his first professional contract with Paniliakos F.C. After a short stay in the Peloponnesian team he moved to Naousa FC, however his big step forward was when he returned to Karditsa to play for his native team Anagennisi Karditsa in Beta Ethniki. Kotsiopoulos played for "Kanaria" for 2,5 years and he moved to Paniliakos again in the half of 2001/02 season, when Anagennisi Karditsa relegated to Gamma Ethniki. He then moved to another club of Peloponnese called Leonidio to return for third time to Paniliakos in 2003/04 season when they promoted to Super League Greece. When Paniliakos were relegated to Beta Ethniki in 2004, Koutsopoulos signed for Messiniakos F.C. and played there for four years. In 2008, he signed for Apollon Kalamarias with the team aiming the immediate comeback to Super League. Financial trouble led the team in Delta Ethniki and Koutsopoulos released and signed on a free transfer by Anagennisi Karditsa in summer 2009. His reflexes and the ability to set up the defence are mainly his virtues which include him in the top goalkeepers in Beta Ethniki. He has already played 18 games this season, saving two penalties and helping "ASA" in difficult moments. Koutsopoulos joined Panthrakikos in 2010 and played for the Komotini club in the Super League Greece, where the league’s official player profile credits him with 18 appearances in 2012–13 and 4 in 2013–14. His later clubs include AO Sellana, Iraklis Sofades, Atromitos Palamas and Digenis Neochoriou. In 2026 he signed with Doxa Mascholouriou for the 2026–27 season of the Gamma Ethniki. His brother, Vangelis Koutsopoulos is also a football player.
