= Vangelis Alexopoulos =

Greek footballer

Personal information
- Full name: Evangelos Alexopoulos
- Date of birth: 16 August 1995 (age 31)
- Place of birth: Kalamata, Greece
- Height: 1.84 m (6 ft 0 in)
- Position: Striker

Team information
- Current team: Marko
- Number: 17

Senior career*
Years	Team	Apps	(Gls)
2017–2019	Apollon Kalamata	58	(35)
2019–2021	Kalamata	36	(3)
2021–2023	Panachaiki	24	(4)
2023–2024	Giouchtas	30	(6)
2024–2025	Ilioupoli	23	(4)
2025–	Marko	23	(1)
- * Club domestic league appearances and goals as of 6 September 2026

Vangelis Alexopoulos (Greek: Βαγγέλης Αλεξόπουλος; born 16 August 1995) is a Greek professional footballer who plays as a striker for Super League 2 club Marko.
