= Kostas Triantafyllou =

Greek footballer

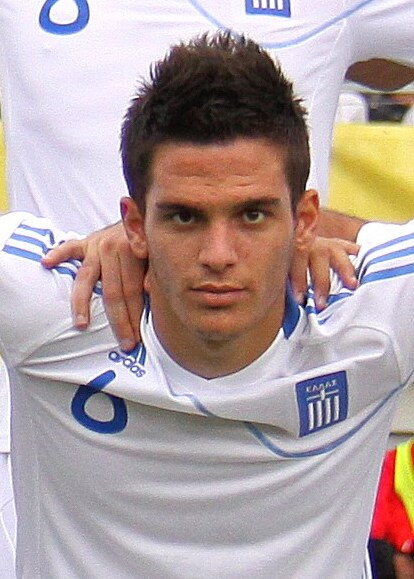
- 2021 picture of Kostas Triantafyllou

Personal information
- Full name: Konstantinos Triantafyllou
- Date of birth: 2 April 1991 (age 35)
- Place of birth: Ptolemaida, Greece
- Height: 1.77 m (5 ft 10 in)
- Position: Midfielder

Senior career*
Years	Team	Apps	(Gls)
2010–2013	Panserraikos		
2013–2014	Panthrakikos		
2014–2015	Panserraikos		
2015	Ethnikos Gazoros		
2016–2019	Apollon Paralimnio		
2019–2021	Panserraikos		
2021–2022	Serres 1800	13	(1)
2022–2025	Pythagoras Kala Dendra	31	(4)

International career
2011–2012	Greece U21	4	(0)
- * Club domestic league appearances and goals

Kostas Triantafyllou (Greek: Κώστας Τριανταφύλλου; born 2 April 1991) is a Greek footballer.
