= Chinamerem Igboeli =

Nigerian footballer

Personal information
- Date of birth: 5 May 2004 (age 22)
- Place of birth: Onitsha, Nigeria
- Position: Forward

Team information
- Current team: Ifeanyi Ubah
- Number: 38

Senior career*
Years	Team	Apps	(Gls)
2020–	Ifeanyi Ubah	10	(2)
- * Club domestic league appearances and goals as of 14:44, 19 August 2021 (UTC)

Chinamerem Igboeli (born 5 May 2004) is a Nigerian footballer who currently plays as a forward for Ifeanyi Ubah.

== Career statistics ==
=== Club ===
As of 19 August 2021.

Club	Season	League			Cup		Continental		Other		Total	
Club	Season	Division	Apps	Goals	Apps	Goals	Apps	Goals	Apps	Goals	Apps	Goals
Ifeanyi Ubah	2020–21	NPFL	10	2	0	0	–		0	0	10	2
Career total			10	2	0	0	0	0	0	0	10	2
