= Franck Eric Tientcheu =

Cameroonian footballer

Franck Tientcheu
Personal information
- Full name: Franck Eric Tientcheu
- Date of birth: 12 November 1996 (age 29)
- Place of birth: Yaoundé, Cameroon
- Height: 1.85 m (6 ft 1 in)
- Position: Midfielder

Team information
- Current team: Ionikos
- Number: 96

Youth career
- Kadji Sports Academy

Senior career*
Years	Team	Apps	(Gls)
–2017	Dragon Club		
2018	ES Métlaoui		
2018–2019	Sparta	19	(1)
2019–	Ionikos	26	(0)
- * Club domestic league appearances and goals as of 27 February 2021

Franck Eric Tientcheu (born 12 November 1996) is a Cameroonian professional footballer who plays as a midfielder for Greek Super League 2 club Ionikos.

== Career ==
Following a youthful spell in the Kadji Sports Academy, he played for domestic Dragon Cljub before signing for Tunisian first-tier club ES Métlaoui. After playing the spring season of the 2017–18 Tunisian Ligue Professionnelle 1 he signed for Greece's Sparta.
