= Argyris Chionis =

Greek poet

Argyris Chionis (Greek: Αργύρης Χιόνης; 22 April 1943 – 25 December 2011) was a Greek poet. In 1967, shortly after the military junta came to power, he emigrated to Paris.

== Selected works ==
- Alpheiós and Aréthousa
