= Admir Bajrović =

Swedish association football player

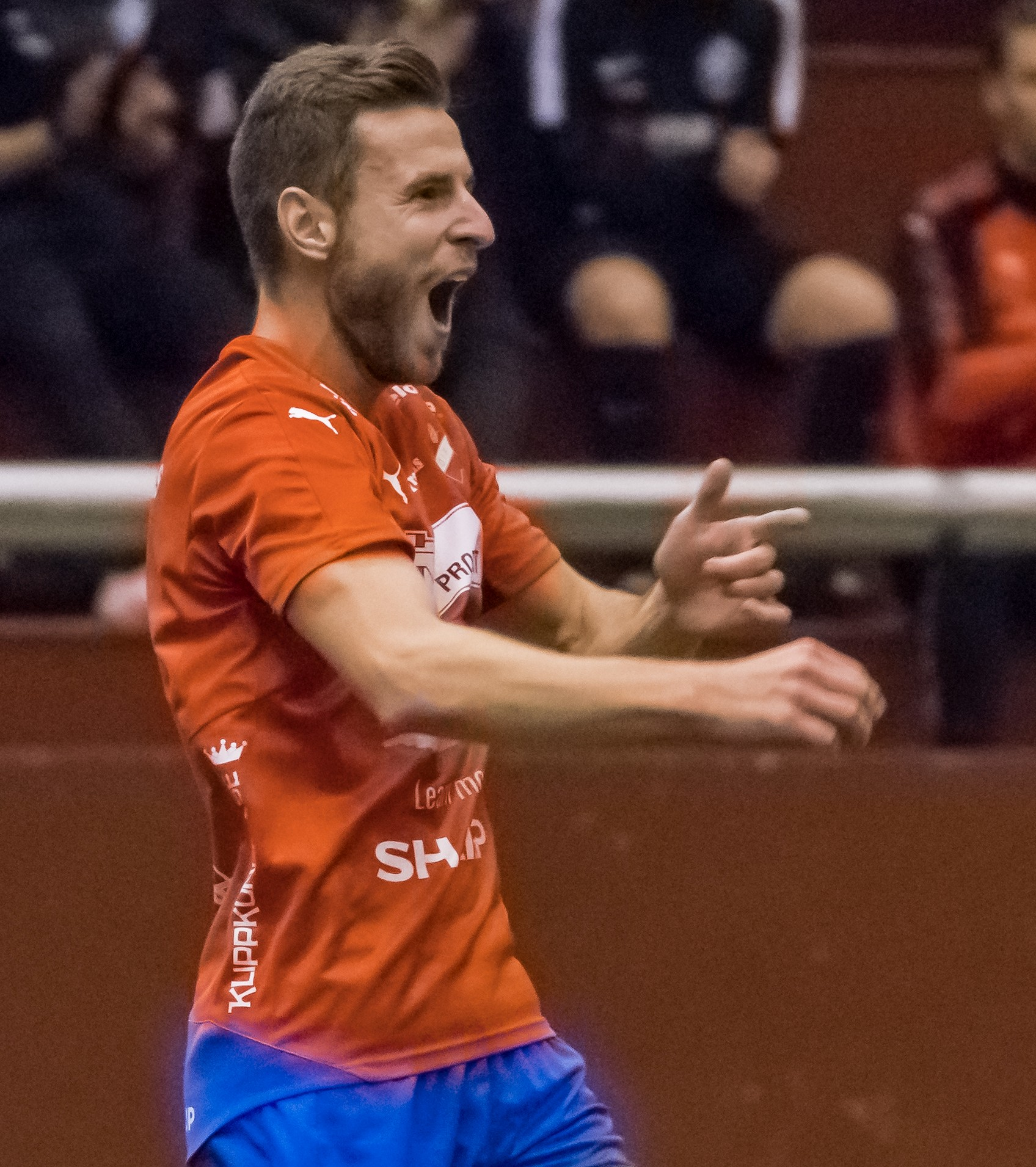
- Bajrović in 2017

Personal information
- Date of birth: 6 August 1995 (age 31)
- Place of birth: Alvesta, Sweden
- Height: 1.78 m (5 ft 10 in)
- Position: Striker

Youth career
- 2001–2010: Trollhättan
- 2012–2014: NEC Nijmegen

Senior career*
Years	Team	Apps	(Gls)
2010–2012	Trollhättan	27	(8)
2014–2015	NEC Nijmegen	1	(0)
2015–2016	Ljungskile	33	(7)
2015	→ Follo (loan)	6	(1)
2017–2018	Östers	34	(9)
2018–2019	Gefle	15	(6)
2019–2020	Panetolikos	39	(10)
2020–2021	Sepsi OSK	13	(2)
2021–2022	Chania	29	(17)
2022	Sukhothai	6	(0)
2023–2024	Panserraikos	26	(3)
2024	Levadiakos	9	(2)
2024–2025	Tirana	23	(3)
2025–2026	Olympiakos Nicosia	16	(1)

International career^{‡}
2012	Sweden U17	4	(2)
2012–2013	Sweden U19	4	(0)
- * Club domestic league appearances and goals as of 14 June 2026 ‡ National team caps and goals as of 20 August 2020

Admir Bajrović (born 6 August 1995) is a Swedish professional footballer who played as a forward for Cypriot First Division club Olympiakos Nicosia.

== International career ==
Bajrović represented the Sweden U17 and U19 teams between 2012 and 2013.

== Career statistics ==
=== Club ===
As of match played 3 April 2024

Appearances and goals by club, season and competition
Club	Season	League			National Cup (Note: Includes KNVB Cup, Svenska Cupen, Greek Cup)		League Cup		Continental		Other		Total	
Club	Season	Division	Apps	Goals	Apps	Goals	Apps	Goals	Apps	Goals	Apps	Goals	Apps	Goals
NEC Nijmegen	2014–15	Eerste Divisie	1	0	1	0	—		—		—		2	0
Ljungskile	2015	Superettan	13	1	3	1	—		—		—		16	2
Ljungskile	2016	Superettan	20	6	3	0	—		—		—		23	6
Ljungskile	Total		33	7	6	1	—		—		—		39	8
Follo (loan)	2015	1. divisjon	6	1	0	0	—		—		—		6	1
Östers	2017	Superettan	23	7	1	1	—		—		—		24	8
Östers	2018	Superettan	11	2	2	0	—		—		—		13	2
Östers	Total		34	9	3	1	—		—		—		37	10
Gefle	2018	Superettan	15	6	1	0	—		—		—		16	6
Panetolikos	2018–19	Super League Greece	15	5	0	0	—		—		—		15	5
Panetolikos	2019–20	Super League Greece	24	5	5	3	—		—		—		29	8
Panetolikos	Total		39	10	5	3	—		—		—		44	13
Sepsi OSK	2020–21	Liga I	13	2	0	0	—		—		—		13	2
Chania	2021–22	Super League Greece 2	29	17	2	1	—		—		—		31	18
Sukhothai	2022–23	Thai League 1	6	0	0	0	—		—		—		6	0
Panserraikos	2022–23	Super League Greece 2	17	3	2	0	—		—		—		19	3
Panserraikos	2023–24	Super League Greece	9	0	2	0	—		—		—		11	0
Panserraikos	Total		26	3	4	0	—		—		—		30	3
Levadiakos	2023–24	Super League Greece 2	9	2	—		—		—		—		9	2
Career total			211	57	22	6	—		—		—		233	63

== Honours ==
NEC Nijmegen

- Eerste Divisie: 2014–15
