= Loukas Apostolidis =

Greek professional football goalkeeper

Loukas Apostolidis (Greek: Λουκάς Αποστολίδης; born 23 October 1980, in Berlin) is a Greek professional football goalkeeper. He previously played for Veria FC, from 2005 to 2008 and Super League Greece side Kerkyra, from 2008 to 2011, and later moved to Iraklis.
