= Dimitris Gourtsas =

Greek footballer

Personal information
- Full name: Dimitrios Gourtsas
- Date of birth: 27 October 1990 (age 36)
- Place of birth: Nigrita, Greece
- Height: 1.76 m (5 ft 9 in)
- Positions: Centre forward; right winger

Team information
- Current team: Nigrita 2018 (manager, player)
- Number: 97

Youth career
- 2002–2005: Visaltiakos Nigrita

Senior career*
Years	Team	Apps	(Gls)
2005–2008	Visaltiakos Nigrita		
2008–2009	Panserraikos	14	(0)
2009–2010	→ Anagennisi Giannitsa (loan)	19	(5)
2010–2011	→ Odysseas Kordelio (loan)	0	(0)
2011–2012	Panserraikos	15	(1)
2012–2013	Panachaiki	36	(8)
2013–2015	AEL	31	(17)
2015	→ Tyrnavos (loan)	10	(2)
2015–2017	Aiginiakos	30	(20)
2017–2018	Panserraikos	39	(17)
2018–2019	Agrotikos Asteras	0	(0)
2019–2021	Panserraikos		
2021–	Nigrita 2018		

International career
2008–2009	Greece U19	4	(0)

Managerial career
- 2023–: Nigrita 2018
- * Club domestic league appearances and goals as of 17:35, 9 March 2018 (UTC)

Dimitris Gourtsas (Greek: Δημήτρης Γκούρτσας; born 27 October 1990) is a Greek footballer and manager. He currently plays for Serres FCA club Nigrita 2018.

== Career ==
Gourtsas made his first football steps just in the age of 12 in his local town team Visaltiakos Nigrita. At the age of 17 he signed for Panserraikos his first professional contract. In the season 2008/09 he had appearances both in the U-21 team of the club and also in the first squad under coach Giannis Papakostas. On 21 August 2013 he signed a three years contract with AEL, where he had his most successful and productive season so far, having scored 17 goals in 26 games in the Greek Football League 2 championship.

On 2 January 2017, he returned to Panserraikos, following his release from Aiginiakos. He finished the 2016–17 season making 30 appearances, scoring 9 goals and giving 4 assists. He started the 2017–18 season as the undisputed leader of the club.
