= Michalis Karvouniaris =

Greek footballer

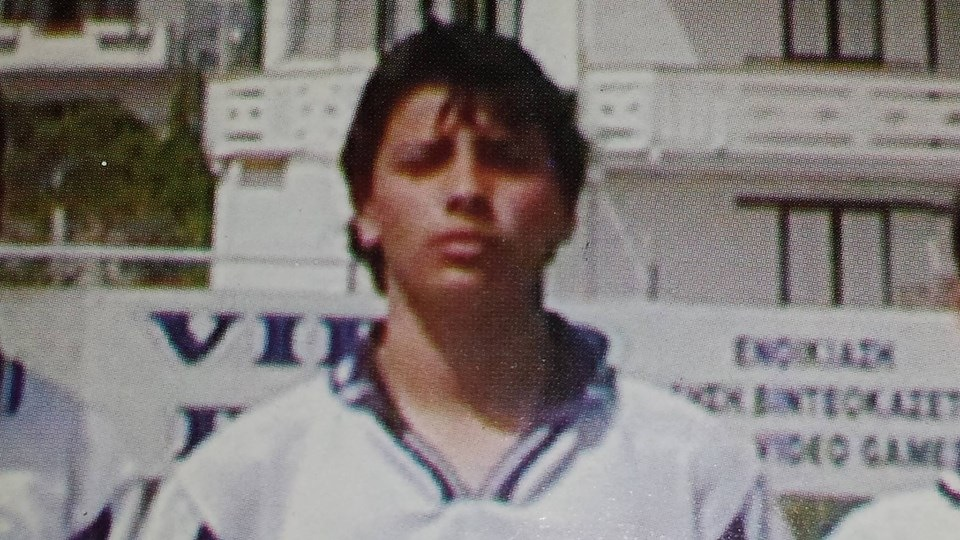
Karvouniaris as a youth with Aris Soudas A.P.S.

Michalis Karvouniaris (Greek: Μιχάλης Καρβουνιάρης; born 12 March 1993) is a Greek professional footballer who plays as a midfielder.

== Career ==
=== Youth ===
Karvouniaris started playing football at the age of seven in a local team named Aris Soudas A.P.S. He played through all the club's youth teams, in which he made great appearances that earned him a call-up in Chania city's mixed team (pre-National team). That team consisted of the best players (of Greek nationality only) of the municipality of Chania teams. In a tournament at Heraklion city in which Karvouniaris team faced Heraklion city's mixed team, he made a stand out performance that caught the attention of the scouters of Ergotelis (by that time Ergotelis were a Super League Greece team), by that time Karvouniaris was 14 years old.

At 15 years of age, Karvouniaris was promoted to Aris Soudas A.P.S. senior team, being one of the youngest players in the team's history to earn a senior appearance.

In the meantime Ergotelis scouters were monitoring his performances with Aris Soudas A.P.S. at Chania city's Premier Division and therefore decided to give him a trial.

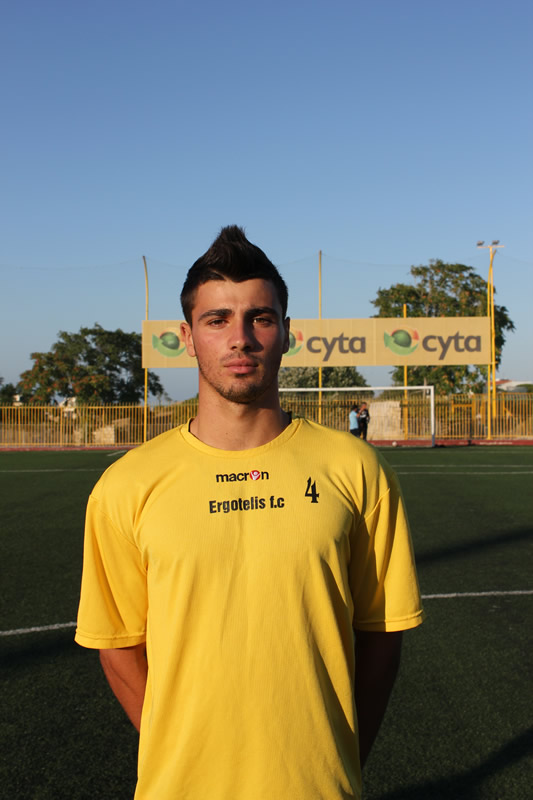
Karvouniaris with Ergotelis under-20

=== 2009–2012 ===
After he managed to impress the coaching stuff and scouters of Ergotelis F.C. since his first day of the trials and after succeeding in the rest of the trainings he took part, Ergotelis F.C. decides to offer to Karvouniaris a youth contract.

From 29 August 2009 Karvouniaris became a part of the Ergotelis U18's team. In his first season at the U18's he made 21 appearances. Though his appearances that season (2009–10) which helped the team achieve the 3rd place in the Championship (to finish behind the Greek powerhouses U18's Olympiacos F.C. and Paok F.C.), he made a great impression on both the team's youth and with the senior coaches, who were tracking his progress.

The next season (2010–11) Karvouniaris was promoted to the Under 20's team of Ergotelis F.C., in which he played for 2 seasons playing in more than 50 games, as well as helping the team reach the semi-finals of Heraklion city's domestic Cup.

=== 2012–2014 ===
On 29 August 2012 Karvouniaris signed for Kissamikos P.G.S. F.C., a team based in Chania, Greece. By that time Kissamikos was competing at the Greek 4th Division.

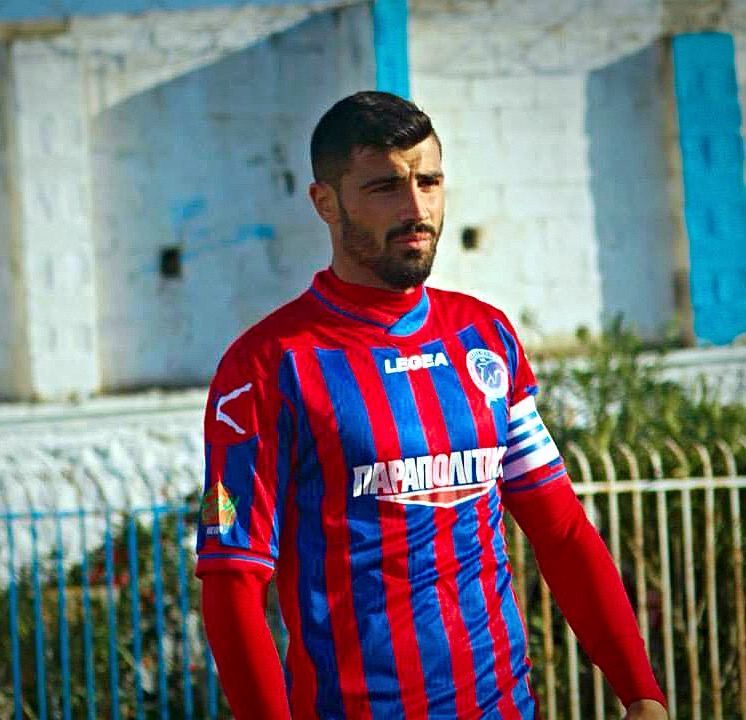
Karvouniaris with Kissamikos in 2014

In his first season (2012–13) Karvouniaris earned 17 appearances in an 18-round Championship. Despite the fact that he was 19 years old Karvouniaris was one of the major reasons to the team's promotion to the Greek 3rd Division (Football League 2). The same season Kissamikos P.G.S. F.C. won Chania city's Super Cup and was a finalist in the Domestic Cup.

The 2013–14 season found Kissamikos P.G.S. F.C. competing in the Greek 3rd Division (Football League 2) for the first time in the club's history, with Karvouniaris once again being one of the team's most valuable players playing 22 games and scoring twice, helping Kissamikos P.G.S. F.C. finish 4th in the Championship with 49 points.

In the first half of the 2014–15 season Karvouniaris was named as captain of Kissamikos P.G.S. F.C.. That first half of the season Karvouniaris capped 12 appearances at Kissamikos second season at the Greek 3rd Division (Football League 2) and played a major role on the club winning the Championship that season and earning the promotion to the Greek 2nd Division (Football League) although the second half of the season he was transferred at Panachaiki F.C.

=== 2015 ===
In the second half of the 2014–15 season Karvouniaris signed his first professional contract with Panachaiki F.C., a team based in Patra, Greece who was competing in the Greek 2nd Division (Football League) and was on the second position that second half of season Karvouniaris signed for them. In his first half season with Panachaiki F.C. he struggled to make an impact playing 2 games at the regular season and another 2 at the season's play-off for the promotion to the Greek 1st Division (Super League), scoring once as well.

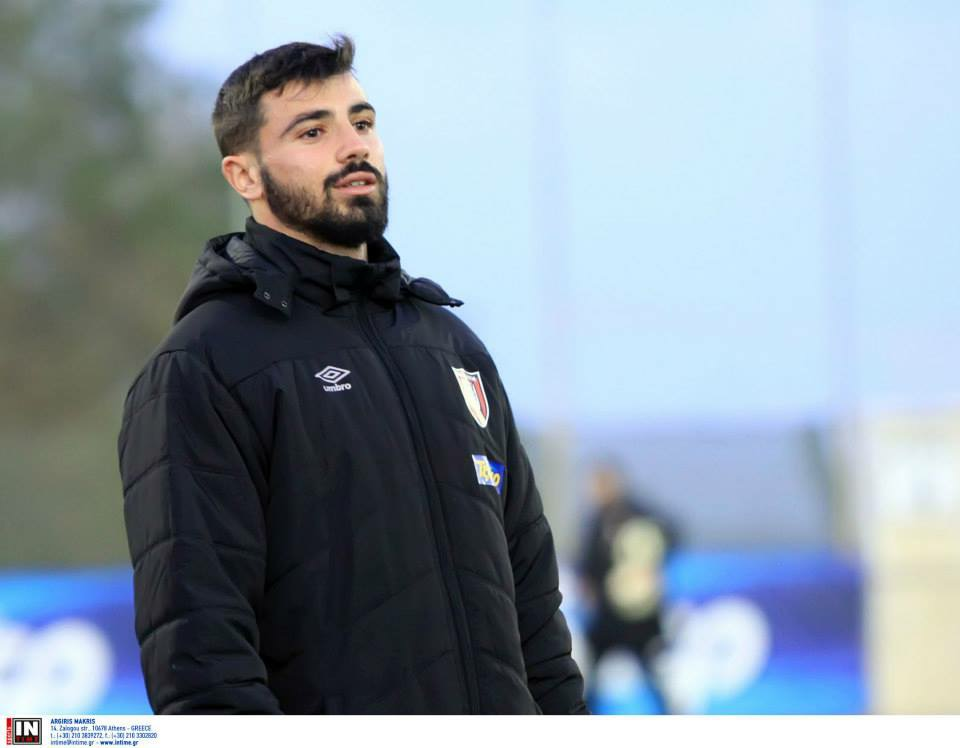
Karvouniaris with Panachaiki in 2015

The first half of the 2015–16 season Karvouniaris started earning the trust of Panachaiki F.C. coaching stuff and fans and he managed to make 7 appearances, before he decided to leave the club due to financial problems they are going through.

=== 2016 ===
Karvouniaris moved to Australia to trial for Northcote City FC in which he succeeded and from January 2016 he signed up with the club. Northcote City F.C. is a club based in Melbourne, Australia and is currently competing in Australia's 2nd Division (PS4 NPL Victoria).
