= Gavriil Apostolidis =

Greek footballer (born 1989)

Personal information
- Date of birth: 12 January 1989 (age 37)
- Place of birth: Kavala, Greece
- Height: 1.80 m (5 ft 11 in)
- Position: Forward

Youth career
- 2004–2007: Doxa Drama
- 2007–2008: Asteras Tripolis

Senior career*
Years	Team	Apps	(Gls)
2006–2007	Doxa Drama	15	(2)
2008–2011	Asteras Tripolis	2	(0)
2011	Kavala	0	(0)
2011–2015	Aris Akropotoamos		
2015–2016	Vyzantio Kokkinochoma		
2016–2017	Nestos Chrysoupoli		
2017–2018	Aetos Orfano		
2018	Thyella Kamari		
2018–2019	Nea Kallikrateia		
2019–	Aetos Orfano		
- * Club domestic league appearances and goals as of 20 June 2011

Gavriil Apostolidis (Greek: Γαβριήλ Αποστολίδης; born 12 January 1989) is a Greek football player.
