= AES Diagoras Stefanovikeio F.C. =

Diagoras Stefanovikeio
- Full name: Athlitikos Eksoraistikos Syllogos Diagoras Stefanovikeio
- Founded: 1957; 69 years ago
- Ground: Stefanovikeio Ground
- Capacity: 502
- Chairman: Tryfon Karatziolis
- Manager: Konstantinos Tsourikas
- League: Thessaly FCA First Division
- 2025–26: Thessaly FCA Second Division, 3rd (promoted)
Home colours

Athlitikos Eksoraistikos Syllogos Diagoras Stefanovikeio (Greek: Aθλητικός Εξωραϊστικός Σύλλογος "Διαγόρας" Στεφανοβικείου) is a Greek football club based in Stefanovikeio, Magnesia, Greece.

== Honours ==
=== National ===
  - Fourth Tier Champions: 1
    - 2020–21

=== Regional ===
  - Thessaly FCA Champions: 1
    - 2018–19
