= Andreas Tsipras =

Greek footballer

Personal information
- Date of birth: 7 October 1993 (age 33)
- Place of birth: Voulpi, Evrytania, Greece
- Height: 1.81 m (5 ft 11 in)
- Position: Forward

Team information
- Current team: Ilisiakos

Youth career
- Thrasyvoulos

Senior career*
| Years | Team | Apps | (Gls) |
| 2011–2012 | Acharnaikos | 0 | (0) |
| 2012–2013 | Ethnikos Asteras | 3 | (1) |
| 2013 | Fokikos | 0 | (0) |
| 2013–2014 | Panerythraikos | 25 | (19) |
| 2014–2017 | Kallithea | 57 | (4) |
| 2017–2018 | Trikala | 19 | (0) |
| 2018–2019 | Iraklis | 3 | (0) |
| 2019–2020 | Trikala | 22 | (2) |
| 2020–2021 | Rodos | 17 | (2) |
| 2021–2022 | Asteras Vlachioti | 21 | (0) |
| 2022–2023 | Panionios | 0 | (0) |
| 2023–2024 | A.O. Ypato | | |
| 2024 | Panegialios | | |
| 2024– | Ilisiakos | | |
- * Club domestic league appearances and goals as of 23 October 2024

Andreas Tsipras (Greek: Ανδρέας Τσίπρας; born 7 October 1993) is a Greek professional footballer who plays as a forward for Gamma Ethniki club Ilisiakos.
