= AO Nea Artaki F.C. =

AO Nea Artaki
- Full name: Athlitikos Omilos Nea Artaki FC
- Founded: 1966; 60 years ago
- Ground: Nea Artaki Municipal Stadium
- Capacity: 600
- Chairman: Giannis Vagiannis
- Manager: Dimitrios Magafinis
- League: Gamma Ethniki
- 2025–26: Gamma Ethniki (Group 5), 2nd
Home colours	Away colours

Athlitikos Omilos Nea Artaki FC (Greek: Αθλητικός Όμιλος Νέας Αρτάκης) is a Greek football club based in Nea Artaki, Euboea, Greece.

== Honours ==
=== Domestic ===
  - Euboea-Boeotia FCA Champions: 2
    - 1972–73, 1973–74
  - Euboea FCA Champions: 8
    - 1984–85, 1992–93, 1998–99, 1999–00, 2005–06, 2013–14, 2018–19, 2022–23
  - Euboea FCA Cup Winners: 7
    - 1981–82, 2001–02, 2003–04, 2013–14, 2018–19, 2021–22, 2023–24
