= David Nazim =

Nigerian association football player

Personal information
- Date of birth: 7 November 1996 (age 30)
- Place of birth: Onitsha, Nigeria
- Height: 1.89 m (6 ft 2 in)
- Position: Midfielder

Team information
- Current team: Hapoel Afula

Senior career*
Years	Team	Apps	(Gls)
2015–2016	Zakynthos	19	(3)
2016–2017	Kerkyra	2	(0)
2017–2018	Ankaran Hrvatini	1	(0)
2018	Panserraikos	18	(1)
2018–2019	Olympiacos Volos		
2019–2020	Apollon Larissa	16	(2)
2020–2022	Karaiskakis	37	(8)
2022–2023	Chania	17	(0)
2023–2024	Egaleo	23	(4)
2024–	Hapoel Afula	33	(0)
- * Club domestic league appearances and goals as of 15 June 2025

David Nazim (born 7 November 1996) is a Nigerian professional footballer who plays as a midfielder for israeli liga leumit club Hapoel Afula.
