= Souli Paramythia F.C. =

Greek football club

Souli Paramythia
- Full name: Athlitikos Podosfairikos Syllogos Souli Paramythia
- Founded: 1934; 92 years ago
- Ground: Paramythia Municipal Stadium
- Capacity: 600
- Chairman: Dimitrios Doumas
- Manager: Evangelos Peponis
- League: Thesprotia FCA First Division
- 2025–26: Thesprotia FCA First Division, 2nd

Souli Paramythia Football Club (Greek: Α.Π.Σ. Σούλι Παραμυθιάς) is a Greek football club, based in Paramythia, Thesprotia, Greece.

== History ==
Souli Paramythia competes in the competitions of the Thesprotia Football Clubs Association. The club won the local league championship for the first time in the 1992–93 season and was promoted to the Delta Ethniki. However, it failed to maintain its position in the division and was immediately relegated back to the local leagues. In the 2006–07 season, the team secured the local championship once again, earning promotion to the Delta Ethniki for a second time, but was again unable to remain in the category and suffered immediate relegation.

During the 2008–09 season, the club won its third local championship and earned promotion once again to the Delta Ethniki. In the 2009–10 season, unlike its previous campaigns, the team successfully avoided relegation and remained in the division for the first time. However, in the following season, it was relegated back to the local leagues once again.

In the 2017–18 season, the team won the local championship undefeated once again, earning promotion to the Gamma Ethniki for the first time in its history. The following season (2018–19), the club finished in 7th place, successfully avoiding relegation in its inaugural campaign. During the 2019–20 season, it competed in the Gamma Ethniki, which effectively acted as the fourth tier of Greek football following the national league restructuring. The championship was suspended due to the COVID-19 pandemic, with Souli finishing in third place with 41 points. Despite earning the right to participate in the Gamma Ethniki for the following season, Souli elected to register for the local regional league instead.

== Honours ==
=== Domestic ===
  - Thesprotia FCA Champion: 4
    - 1992–93, 2006–07, 2008–09, 2017–18
  - Thesprotia FCA Cup Winners: 5
    - 2011–12, 2013–14, 2014–15, 2015–16, 2018–19
  - Thesprotia FCA Super Cup Winners: 3
    - 2012, 2015, 2016
