= Diego Peláez (footballer) =

Spanish footballer (born 1989)

Personal information
- Full name: Diego Peláez Silva
- Date of birth: 18 May 1989 (age 37)
- Place of birth: Santiago de Compostela, Spain
- Height: 1.75 m (5 ft 9 in)
- Positions: Attacking midfielder; left winger

Youth career
- Celta

Senior career*
Years	Team	Apps	(Gls)
2008–2009	Céltiga		
2009–2010	Pontevedra B	17	(5)
2011–2012	Coruxo	20	(1)
2012–2014	Compostela	63	(4)
2014–2015	Cultural Leonesa	30	(5)
2015–2016	Racing de Ferrol	32	(4)
2016	Marbella	13	(1)
2017	Sabadell	10	(2)
2017–2018	Mirandés	22	(2)
2018–2019	Conquense	14	(0)
2019	Teruel	15	(1)
2019–2020	Trikala	22	(4)
2020	Managua	9	(0)
2021	Lorca Deportiva	15	(1)
2021	Resources Capital	2	(0)
- * Club domestic league appearances and goals as of 30 January 2022

Diego Peláez Silva (born 18 May 1989) is a Spanish professional footballer who plays as an attacking midfielder or winger.

== Club career ==
In 2014, Peláez signed for Cultural Leonesa in the Spanish third division. On 5 October 2014, Peláez scored his first goal for Cultural Leonesa during a 3–1 win over Burgos from the halfway line.

In 2019, he signed for Greek third division club Trikala.

In 2020, Peláez signed for Managua in Nicaragua.

Before the second half of the 2020–21 season, he signed for Spanish team Lorca Deportiva.

In October 2021, Peláez signed for Hong Kong Premier League club Resources Capital. On 31 October 2021, he debuted for Resources Capital in a 4–0 loss to Southern District. On 29 January 2022, he left the club after featuring in seven games for RCFC, including groups stage of Sapling Cup and the HKPL.
