= Michalis Papanikolas =

Greek footballer

Personal information
- Full name: Michail Papanikolas
- Date of birth: 28 March 1993 (age 33)
- Place of birth: Athens, Greece
- Height: 1.88 m (6 ft 2 in)
- Position: Centre-back

Team information
- Current team: Aris Petroupolis

Youth career
- Proodeftiki

Senior career*
Years	Team	Apps	(Gls)
2011–2013	Proodeftiki	39	(3)
2013–2014	Olympiacos Volos	3	(0)
2014–2015	Ethnikos Piraeus	0	(0)
2015	Istiaia	0	(0)
2015–2016	Proodeftiki	0	(0)
2016–2017	Acharnaikos	0	(0)
2017–2018	Proodeftiki	0	(0)
2018–2023	Egaleo	75	(2)
2023–	Aris Petroupolis		
- * Club domestic league appearances and goals

Michalis Papanikolas (Greek: Μιχάλης Παπανικόλας; born 28 March 1993) is a Greek professional footballer who plays as a centre-back for Aris Petroupolis.

== Honours ==
Egaleo

- Gamma Ethniki: 2018–19
