= Argyris Brebos =

Greek footballer (born 1996)

Personal information
- Full name: Anargyros Brebos
- Date of birth: 24 September 1996 (age 30)
- Place of birth: Athens, Greece
- Height: 1.85 m (6 ft 1 in)
- Position: Winger

Team information
- Current team: Egaleo
- Number: 26

Youth career
- 2009–2015: Thrasyvoulos
- 2015–2016: Panionios

Senior career*
Years	Team	Apps	(Gls)
2016–2017	Panelefsiniakos	4	(0)
2017–2018	Aspropyrgos	18	(0)
2018–2019	Acharnaikos	19	(4)
2019–2021	Apollon Larissa	10	(0)
2021	Karaiskakis	12	(1)
2021–2022	Egaleo	8	(0)
2022–	Proodeftiki	0	(0)
- * Club domestic league appearances and goals as of 13 April 2022

Argyris Brebos (Greek: Αργύρης Μπρέμπος; born 24 September 1996) is a Greek professional footballer who plays as a winger for Super League 2 club Egaleo.
