= A.E. Karitsa F.C. =

Greek football club

A.E. Karitsa
- Full name: Athlitiki Enosi Karitsa
- Founded: 1981; 45 years ago
- Ground: Karitsa Municipal Stadium
- Chairman: Antonis Paschalis
- Manager: Ioakim Beniskos
- League: Gamma Ethniki
- 2025–26: Pieria FCA First Division, 1st (promoted)
Home colours	Away colours

A.E. Karitsa Football Club (Greek: Α.Ε. Καρίτσας) is a Greek football club, based in Karitsa, Pieria, Greece

== History ==
A.E. Karitsa was founded in 1981. The club's football team won the Pieria FCA championship during the 1997–98 season, earning promotion to the Delta Ethniki. It made its first appearance in the Delta Ethniki during the 1998–99 season, finishing 17th in Group 5 with 19 points, which resulted in relegation back to the local divisions. In the 2017–18 season, the team participated in the amateur Gamma Ethniki, taking the spot of Poseidon Neon Poron, and finished 12th in Group 1 with 28 points, leading to relegation to the local leagues once again.

During the 2018–19 season, the club won the Pieria FCA championship and returned to the Gamma Ethniki, which by then operated as the fourth tier. It remained there for two seasons (2019–20 & 2020–21). In fact, during the 2020–21 season, A.E. Karitsa came close to reaching the promotion play-offs after finishing in 2nd place; however, it declared an inability to participate for the 2021–22 season and subsequently returned to the Pieria FCA championships. In the 2025–26 season, A.E. Karitsa won its third Pieria FCA championship, returning to Gamma Ethniki after 5 years. The season concluded with the double after winning the Pieria FCA Cup, defeating Svoronos 5–4 on penalties following a 1–1 draw in regular time.

== Honours ==
=== Domestic ===
  - Pieria FCA Champions: 3
    - 1997–98, 2018–19, 2025–26
  - Pieria FCA Cup Winners: 3
    - 2017–18, 2018–19, 2025–26
