= Megas Alexandros Kallithea F.C. =

Greek football club

Megas Alexandros Kallithea
- Founded: 1984; 41 years ago
- Dissolved: 2021 (merged with Kastoria F.C.)
- Ground: Kastoria Municipal Stadium

Megas Alexandros Kallithea Football Club was a Greek football club, based in Kastoria (Kallithea neighborhood), Kastoria, Greece.

== History ==
The club was founded in 1984 and named after Megas Alexandros. It played in Gamma Ethniki, Greek football's third tier for 3 seasons in recent years. In 2021 after 37 years of operation, Megas Alexandros was absorbed by Kastoria 1980 F.C. in order for the latter to participate in a national division.

== Honours ==
=== Domestic ===
  - Kastoria FCA champion: 3
    - 2015–16, 2017–18, 2019–20
  - Kastoria FCA Cup Winners: 2
    - 2014–15, 2015–16

== Notable players ==
- (Greece) Konstantinos Kormaris
