= A.P.O. Atalanti F.C. =

APO Atalanti
- Full name: Athlitikos Podosferikos Omilos Atalanti
- Founded: 1968; 58 years ago
- Ground: Atalanti Municipal Stadium
- Chairman: Konstantinos Tsakanikas
- League: Phthiotis FCA
- 2025–26: Phthiotis FCA First Division, 11th
Home colours	Away colours

APO Atalanti Football Club (Greek: Αθλητικός Ποδοσφαιρικός Όμιλος Αταλάντης) is a Greek football club based in Atalanti, Phthiotis, Greece.

== History ==
On 13 June 1968, Athletic Football Club "Atalanti" (APO Atalanti) was officially founded through the merger of "Aias Lokrou" (founded in 1928 with football and athletics departments) and "Olympiacos Atalanti" (founded in 1931 with a football department). Since its inception, the club has officially competed in the regional championships of the Phthiotis Football Clubs Association.

During the 1982–83 season, the club competed in the National Amateur Championship, marking its first appearance in a national division. In the 1984–85 season, it reached the final of the Phthiotis FCA Cup for the first time, losing to APOK Velouchi. In the 1992–93 season, the club reached the cup final for a second time, defeating AO Malesina 2–1 to win its first Phthiotis FCA Cup title, before winning the trophy again in the 1995–96 season by beating Olympiacos Anthili in the final.

In 1992, the club was crowned Phthiotis FCA champion for the first time in its history and earned promotion to the Delta Ethniki, where it competed continuously during the 1992–93, 1993–94, and 1994–95 seasons, making its last appearance in that division during the 2002–03 season. In 2019, after 27 years, the club won the Phthiotis FCA championship for the second time and earned promotion to the Gamma Ethniki, completing a domestic double by also winning the Phthiotis FCA Cup for the third time in its history.

== Honours ==
=== Domestic ===
  - Phthiotis FCA Champions: 2
    - 1991–92, 2018–19
  - Phthiotis FCA Cup Winners: 3
    - 1992–93, 1995–96, 2018–19
