= A.S. Meteora F.C. =

Greek football club

A.S. Meteora
- Full name: Athlitikos Syllogos Meteora
- Founded: 1929; 97 years ago
- Ground: Kalabaka Municipal Stadium
- Capacity: 1,426
- Chairman: Georgios Ratzas
- Manager: Spyros Evangelou
- League: Trikala FCA First Division
- 2025–26: Trikala FCA First Division, 2nd
- Website: https://www.asmeteora.gr/
Home colours	Away colours

A.S. Meteora Football Club (Greek: Α.Σ. Μετέωρα) is a Greek football club, based in Kalabaka, Trikala, Greece. It is named after the Meteora Greek Orthodox monasteries which are located in the town.

== Honours ==
=== Domestic ===
  - Trikala FCA Champions (11):
    - 1974–75, 1977–78, 1979–80, 1985–86, 1996–97, 2001–02, 2008–09, 2011–12, 2017–18, 2022–23, 2023–24
  - Trikala FCA Cup Winners (15):
    - 1975–76, 1977–78, 1978–79, 1980–81, 1981–82, 1983–84, 1984–85, 1997–98, 1999–2000, 2001–02, 2002–03, 2007–08, 2013–14, 2018–19, 2025–26

== Current squad ==
As of 5 November 2019

Note: Flags indicate national team as defined under FIFA eligibility rules; some limited exceptions apply. Players may hold more than one non-FIFA nationality.

No.	Pos.	Nation	Player
—	GK	GRE	Michalis Zaropoulos
—	GK	GRE	Themis Goulionis
—	GK	GRE	Giorgos Georgiou
—	DF	GRE	Angelos Zisis
—	DF	GRE	Panagiotis Papaefthymiou
—	DF	GRE	Thodoris Fortounis
—	DF	GRE	Panagiotis Avgeros
—	DF	GRE	Thodoris Christodoulopoulos
—	DF	GRE	Antonis Tampouras
—	DF	GRE	Panagiotis Manolis
—	DF	GRE	Apostolos Ioannidis
—	DF	GRE	Christos Grigoriou

No.	Pos.	Nation	Player
—	MF	GRE	Giannis Kiakos
—	MF	GRE	Vangelis Litsios
—	MF	GRE	Nikos Syrakos
—	MF	GRE	Tasos Maroudas
—	MF	GRE	Leonidas Ioannou
—	MF	GRE	Andreas Georgakis
—	MF	GRE	Thanasis Ouzounoglou
—	FW	GRE	Nikos Skondras
—	FW	GRE	Panagiotis Polyzopoulos
—	FW	GRE	Giorgos Metsiotis
—	FW	GRE	Giorgos Andreopoulos
