= P.O. Elassona F.C. =

Association football club in Greece

- Full name: Podosfairikos Omilos Elassona F.C.
- Founded: 1957; 69 years ago
- Ground: Elassona Municipal Stadium
- Capacity: 1,500
- Chairman: Konstantinos Batsilas
- Manager: Sotirios Tsatsos
- League: Gamma Ethniki
- 2025–26: Gamma Ethniki (Group 3), 1st
Home colours	Away colours

P.O. Elassona Football Club (Greek: Ποδοσφαιρικός Όμιλος Ελασσόνας) is a Greek football club based in Elassona, Larissa, Greece.

== History ==
=== 1922–1936: Proodeftikos Omilos ===
The club was founded in 1922 under the name of Proodeftikos Omilos Elassona. It was housed in the Millet Bahçe building, and its activity continued until 1936, when the 4th of August Regime was declared, which also abolished P.O.E..

=== 1957: Refounding ===
Re-established in 1957 under the name Podosfairikos Omilos Elassona (Elassona Football Club), with Antonis Kyrkos serving as the club's first president. The year 1957 also marks the official founding year of the club. It participated in the championships of the Thessaly FCA until 1960, when the Larissa FCA was founded; P.O.E. was one of its 22 founding member clubs and participated in its inaugural championship, winning the Group A title in the Third Division. From 1963 onwards, it consistently competed in the First Division.

=== Promotion to Beta Ethniki ===
20 years after its refounding, P.O.E. reached Beta Ethniki. The club could not maintain this position, but in the 1980–81 season it was promoted back to the second-tier division, gaining widespread recognition among Greek football fans.

=== Modern Era ===
In 2007, the club merged with the other team from Elassona, Olosson, creating Podosfairiki Synenosi Elassona (Elassona Football Union). The name was maintained until 2011–12, when the club readopted its historical name (P.O.E.), aspiring to regain its past prestige. During the 2019–20 season, the club achieved promotion to Gamma Ethniki as runners-up of the Larissa FCA, competing in Group 3. It finished 9th, securing its survival in the division. In the 2021–22 season, it finished 3rd in Group 3 of Gamma Ethniki. In 2024, Giorgos Kaltekis assumed the role of technical director at P.O.E. Meanwhile, the team finished in 2nd place in the Larissa FCA championship. In the 2024–25 season, P.O.E. won the championship title and participated in the special promotion tournament, through which it earned promotion back to Gamma Ethniki.

In the 2025–26 season, P.O.E. finished in 1st place in Group 3 of Gamma Ethniki, securing its participation in the promotion play-offs. The club faced the champions of the other three Northern groups (Panthrakikos, Apollon Kalamarias, and Ethnikos Neo Keramidi), but failed to achieve a historic promotion to Super League 2. Simultaneously, Elassona won the Larissa FCA Cup for the fifth time, defeating the Larissa FCA champion, Iraklis Larissa, 2–1 in the final held at the AEL FC Arena.

=== Notable coaches ===
- (Argentina) Horacio Morales
- (Greece) Vangelis Moras
- (Greece) Zisis Ziagas
- (Greece) Alexis Alexandris
- (Greece) Giorgos Kaltekis

=== Notable players ===
- (Argentina) Daniel Hill
- (Greece) Kostas Siavalas
- (Greece) Giannis Galitsios
- (Greece) Giannis Alexoulis
- (Greece) Konstantinos Banousis

== Stadium ==
P.O.E. uses the Elassona Municipal Stadium (capacity: 1,500 seated) for its home matches, which serves as the traditional venue of the team. On October 15, 2022, the renovated Municipal Stadium of the town was officially inaugurated, preceding a friendly match between P.O.E. and AEL.

== Rivalries ==
Oikonomos Tsaritsani is considered the club's "eternal" rival since the 1950s due to the proximity of the two towns. Numerous derbies have been played over the years, with the home grounds of both teams almost always packed to capacity.

== Honours ==
=== National ===
- Gamma Ethniki: 2
  - 1976–77, 2025–26
- Delta Ethniki: 1
  - 1983–84

=== Domestic ===
- Larissa FCA Champions: 3
  - 1987–88, 2008–09 (as PS Elassona), 2024–25
- Larissa FCA Cup Winners: 5
  - 2010–11 (as PS Elassona), 2018–19, 2021–22, 2022–23, 2025–26
- Larissa FCA Super Cup Winners: 1
  - 2026
