= P.S. "I Sparti" =

Greek football club

Podosferikós Sýllogos «I Sparti»
- Full name: Νέος Ποδοσφαιρικός Σύλλογος Δήμου Σπάρτης; Néos Podosferikós Sýllogos Dímou Spartis; New Football Club of the Municipality of Sparta
- Founded: 2010 as Athlitiki Enosi Pellana-Kastoreio
- Dissolved: 2020
- Ground: Sparta Municipal Stadium, Sparta, Greece

P.S. «I Sparti» (Greek: Π.Σ. "Η Σπάρτη"), short for Podosferikós Sýllogos «I Sparti» was a Greek football club, based in Pellana, Laconia, Greece. The club last competed in the Gamma Ethniki, the third tier of the Greek football league system.

== History ==
Old crest (2010–2019).

The club was founded in 2010 as Athlitiki Enosi Pellana-Kastoreio, enjoying relative success in the region as they won the Laconia FCA Cup in 2013. In 2018, they were promoted to the Gamma Ethniki, the third tier of the Greek football league system for the first time in their history after winning the Laconia regional championship. On 12 August 2019, the club was renamed as Néos Podosferikós Sýllogos Dímou Spartis.

== Honours ==
=== Domestic Titles and Honours ===
  - Laconia FCA Champion: 1
    - 2017–18
  - Laconia FCA Cup Winners: 1
    - 2012–13

== Players ==
=== Current squad ===
As of 7 January 2020

Note: Flags indicate national team as defined under FIFA eligibility rules; some limited exceptions apply. Players may hold more than one non-FIFA nationality.

No.	Pos.	Nation	Player
—	GK	POL	Maciej Czyzniewski
—	GK	GRE	Thanasis Gimousis
—	DF	GRE	Theodoros Platanas
—	DF	GRE	Konstantinos Kontogiannis
—	DF	GRE	Panagiotis Tsimiklis
—	DF	GRE	Christos Panagiotidis
—	DF	GRE	Thanasis Aspiotis
—	DF	GRE	Iosif Lampropoulos
—	DF	GRE	Giannis Sotiropoulos
—	MF	GRE	Dimitris Petridis
—	MF	GRE	Georgios Anastasakos
—	MF	GRE	Leonidas Rassias

No.	Pos.	Nation	Player
—	MF	GRE	Konstantinos Banousis
—	MF	GRE	Thanasis Kakamis
—	MF	GRE	Georgios Gemistos
—	FW	GRE	Georgios Sampatakos
—	FW	GRE	Konstantinos Kardaris
—	FW	GRE	Dimitris Mikelatos
—	FW	GRE	Dimitris Zarafetas
—	FW	GRE	Christos Spyropoulos
—	FW	GRE	Efthymis Dimitrelis
—	FW	GRE	Georgios Sikalopoulos
—	FW	GRE	Omiros Syrengelas
