= AO Sellana F.C. =

Association football club in Greece

AO Sellana
- Founded: 1968; 58 years ago
- Ground: Proastio Ground
- Chairman: Georgios Kouvaras
- Manager: Giannis Pontikas
- League: Karditsa FCA First Division
- 2025–26: Karditsa FCA First Division, 3rd
Home colours	Away colours

AO Sellana Football Club (Greek: Α.Ο. Σελλάνων) is a Greek football club based in Sellana, Karditsa, Greece.

== History ==
The club was founded in 1968 as "Proodos Proastio" and was renamed to its current name in 1999. During the 2002–03 season, it competed in the Delta Ethniki, from which it was relegated immediately. In the 2013–14 and 2015–16 seasons, AO Sellana won the Karditsa FCA championship but failed to gain promotion to Gamma Ethniki through the promotion play-offs between the FCA champions in 2014 and 2016. The club won its third local championship during the 2016–17 season and competed in the Gamma Ethniki from 2017 until 2021.

== Honours ==
=== Domestic Titles and honours ===
  - Karditsa FCA Champions: 3
    - 2013–14, 2015–16, 2016–17
  - Karditsa FCA Cup Winners: 4
    - 2013–14, 2016–17, 2017–18, 2018–19
  - Karditsa FCA Super Cup Winners: 2
    - 2014, 2016
