= Aetos Orfano F.C. =

Aetos Orfano
- Founded: 1979; 47 years ago
- Ground: Ofrynio Municipal Stadium
- Chairman: Nikolaos Lampidis
- Manager: Pantelis Stylianos
- League: Gamma Ethniki
- 2019–20: Gamma Ethniki, 4th

Aetos Orfano Football Club (Greek: Α.Σ. Αετός Ορφανού) is a Greek football club, based in Ofrynio, Kavala, Greece.

== Honours ==
=== Domestic ===
  - Kavala FCA Champions: 1
    - 2016–17
  - Kavala FCA Cup Winners: 1
    - 2013–14
