= Dimitrios Kiliaras =

Greek footballer (born 1986)

Personal information
- Date of birth: 23 March 1986 (age 40)
- Place of birth: Heraklion, Crete, Greece
- Height: 1.70 m (5 ft 7 in)
- Position: Midfielder

Team information
- Current team: OFAM

Youth career
- –2002: Irodotos

Senior career*
Years	Team	Apps	(Gls)
2002–2008	Ergotelis	94	(8)
2008–2011	Panionios	16	(0)
2009–2010	→ Ergotelis (loan)	11	(0)
2011–2012	Levadiakos	25	(1)
2012–2013	AEP Paphos	10	(0)
2013	Panachaiki	15	(0)
2013–2014	Iraklis Psachna	20	(3)
2014	Panegialios	9	(0)
2014–2015	Panargiakos	0	(0)
2015–2016	Ialysos	?	(4)
2016	Sparti	9	(3)
2016–2017	Ergotelis	15	(2)
2017	Irodotos	16	(8)
2017–2019	Kronos Argyrades		
2019–2020	Almyros Gazi		
2020–2021	Irodotos		
2022	Almyros Gazi		
2022–2023	PAO Korakiana		
2023–2024	Asteras Petriti		
2024–2025	Olympiada Karousades		
2025–	OFAM		

International career
2006–2007	Greece U21	8	(1)
- * Club domestic league appearances and goals as of 10 September 2019

Dimitrios Kiliaras (Greek: Δημήτριος Κοιλιάρας; born 23 March 1986) is a Greek professional footballer who plays as a midfielder for Gamma Ethniki club OFAM.

== Career ==
Kiliaras began playing football with local club Irodotos, before moving to Gamma Ethniki side Ergotelis in 2002. As the club celebrated consecutive promotions to reach the Alpha Ethniki (later renamed to Super League) in 2004, Kiliaras made his top-flight debut during the 2004–05 season. He impressed with his performances for Ergotelis in the Super League, earning a transfer to Panionios on 16 May 2008 for a reported 500K Euros. Playing the same position as Panionios Uruguayan stars at the time Álvaro Recoba and Fabián Estoyanoff, Kiliaras did not manage to maintain a place in the club's starting XI, and was subsequently loaned out back to Ergotelis in 2009.

After his contract with Panionios ended, Kiliaras moved to fellow Super League side Levadiakos. He then spent one season in Cyprus with AEP Paphos before returning to Greece signing for Football League side Panachaiki. Kiliaras eventually went back to playing in the Gamma Ethniki, featuring for 2015–16 Group 3 champions Sparti in 2016. On 1 July 2016, Kiliaras returned to a Gamma Ethniki side Ergotelis for the third time in his career, 6 years past his loan spell from Panionios.

In January 2017, Kiliaras requested to be released from his contract with Ergotelis, expressing his desire to return to his very first club, Irodotos, playing in Heraklion's top regional division, and help them in their struggle to return to the Gamma Ethniki. Ergotelis reluctantly granted the player's wish and his contract was therefore terminated on 22 January 2017. Kiliaras' transfer made an impact for Irodotos, as the club won four trophies that season, including the Heraklion Football Clubs Association double, the Greek Football Amateur Cup and the Amateurs' Super Cup. Kiliaras actually secured the final trophy for Irodotos by scoring the winning goal (0–1) in the 74th minute. In total, Kiliaras scored 8 goals in 16 caps for Irodotos.

In the summer of 2017, Kiliaras moved to Corfu, signing with local FCA A1 club Kronos Argyrades, whom he helped gain consecutive promotions to the Gamma Ethniki and the Football League during a two-year stay. In the summer of 2019, Kiliaras returned to Crete, and signed a contract with local FCA A1 Championship club Almyros.

In the summer 2020, Kiliaras returned to his former club, Irodotos. In January 2022, Kiliaras was back at Almyros Gazi. Six months later, in June 2022, he left the club as he had to travel to Corfu for family reasons. A few days later, he signed with PAO Korakiana from Corfu.

In July 2023, he joined Asteras Petriti. A year later, in July 2024, Kiliaras signed for Olympiada Karousades.

== Personal life ==
Born in Heraklion, Kiliaras began playing football at a young age, when his father, a retired Irodotos footballer, signed him up at the infrastructure segments of his former club. His younger brother Giannis is also a professional footballer, currently playing for Irodotos. They played together for Ergotelis in the Super League during the 2007–08 season.

== Honours ==
=== Club ===
==== Sparti ====
- Gamma Ethniki: 2015–16

==== Irodotos ====
- Greek Football Amateur Cup: 2016–17
- Amateurs' Super Cup: 2017

==== Kronos Argyrades ====
- Gamma Ethniki: 2018–19
