= 2013–14 Amateurs' Super Cup Greece =

2014 Amateurs' Super Cup Greece
AEL	Panerythraikos
2	1
- Date: 8 June 2014
- Venue: Amfissa Municipal Stadium, Amfissa
- Referee: Konstantinos Konstantakis (Achaea)
- Weather: Clear; 27 °C (81 °F)

The 2014 Amateurs' Super Cup was the 1st edition of the Greek Amateurs' Super Cup, an annual Greek football match played between the winner of the previous season's Gamma Ethniki Cup winner and the winner of the Greek Amateur Cup.

The match was contested by Larissa, winners of the 2013–14 Football League 2 Cup, and Panerythraikos, the 2013–14 Greek Amateurs' Cup winners. AEL eventually won the match 2 − 1 in overtime, thus completing the amateur treble, having previously won both the 2013–14 Football League 2 Group 2 and Cup for that season.

== Details ==
8 June 2014
18:30 EET

AEL	2–1 (a.e.t.)	Panerythraikos
Bousinakis 66'; Tsemperidis 99'	Report	Tsipras 90'

Amfissa Municipal Stadium, Amfissa
Referee: Konstantinos Konstantakis (Achaea)

AEL	Panerythraikos

GK	?	(Greece) Georgios Sikalias
DF	?	(Greece) Nikos Karanikas
DF	?	(Greece) Dimitris Roussis
DF	?	(Greece) Nikos Arabatzis
MF	?	(Greece) Georgios Siakkas
MF	?	(Greece) Konstantinos Nebegleras(c)
MF	?	(Greece) Thanasis Patiniotis
MF	?	(Greece) Alexandros Tsemperidis	(yellow card) 71'	(substituted off) 105'
MF	?	(Greece) Dimitris Pliagas		(substituted off) 62'
FW	?	(Greece) Nestoras Stefanidis
FW	?	(Greece) Apostolos Garyfallopoulos		(substituted off) 76'
Substitutes:
GK	?	(Greece) Anastasios Karakoutsis
DF	?	(Greece) Konstantinos Koromilas
DF	?	(Greece) Giannis Agtzidis
MF	?	(Greece) Georgios Savvidis		(substituted in) 76'
MF	?	(Greece) Konstantinos Koulidis		(substituted in) 105'
FW	?	(Greece) Dimitiros Tzoumakis
MF	?	(Greece) Periklis Bousinakis		(substituted in) 62'
Manager:
(Greece) Panagiotis Tzanavaras

GK	?	(Greece) Manolis Molfesis
DF	?	(Greece) Karolos Glinos	(substituted off) 110'
DF	?	(Greece) Labros Golias (c)
DF	?	(Greece) Konstantinos Gritzas
MF	?	(Greece) Konstantinos Adraktas
MF	?	(Greece) Spididon Chatzis
MF	?	(Greece) Kogiannis
MF	?	(Greece) Romanos Mikos	(substituted off) 72'
MF	?	(Greece) Charalabos Papathanasiou	(substituted in) 79'
FW	?	(Greece) Andreas Tsipras
FW	?	(Greece) Nikos Antoniadis
Substitutes:
GK	?	(Greece) Pantelis Pidoulas
MF	?	(Greece) Dimitrios Anagnostis
DF	?	(Greece) Filippos Saxinidis
MF	?	(Greece) Evangelos Papadopoulos	(substituted in) 110'
FW	?	(Greece) Antonios Basteas	(substituted in) 79'
FW	?	(Greece) Dimitrios Giannopoulos	(substituted in) 72'
DF	?	(Greece) Petros Triantafyllou
Manager:
(Greece) Antonis Tsimpakis

Match officials:

- Assistant referees:
  - Themistoklis Spanos (Achaea)
  - Panagiotis Messinis (Achaea)
- Fourth official: Nikolaos Makripodis (Achaea)

Match rules

- 90 minutes
- 30 minutes extra-time if the scores still level
- Penalty shoot-out if scores still level
- Six named substitutes, of which three may be used
