= 2016–17 Amateurs' Super Cup Greece =

2017 Amateurs' Super Cup Greece
A.E. Karaiskakis	Irodotos
0	1
- Date: 4 June 2017
- Venue: Elefsina Municipal Stadium, Elefsina
- Referee: Konstantinos Katikos

The 2017 Amateurs' Super Cup was the 3rd edition of the Greek Amateurs' Super Cup, an annual Greek football match played between the winner of the previous season's Gamma Ethniki Cup and the winner of the Amateur Cup.

The match was contested by A.E. Karaiskakis, winners of the 2016–17 Gamma Ethniki Cup, and Irodotos, the 2016–17 Greek Amateurs' Cup winners. It was eventually won by Irodotos with a 0 − 1 victory. This was the fourth trophy in total won by the club for the 2016–17 season, as Irodotos had previously won the Heraklion FCA Championship and Heraklion FCA Cup double, along with the Greek Football Amateur Cup.

== Details ==
4 June 2017
TBD EET

A.E. Karaiskakis	0 − 1	Irodotos
	Report	Kiliaras 74'

Elefsina Municipal Stadium, Elefsina
Referee: Konstantinos Katikos (Athens)

Karaiskakis	Irodotos

GK	?	(Greece) Apostolos Siaravas
DF	?	(Greece) Nikolaos Papanikou	(substituted off) 76'
DF	?	(Greece) Spiros Lamprou
DF	?	(Greece) Apostolos Avramidis
DF	?	(Greece) Aristotelis Karagiannidis	(yellow card) 64'
DF	?	(Greece) Konstantinos Chartsias
MF	?	(United States) George Collins
MF	?	(Greece) German Datidis
MF	?	(Greece) Alexandros Bekatoros	(substituted off) 74'
MF	?	(Greece) Alexandros Maziotis	(substituted off) 53'
FW	?	(Greece) Charalampos Zygeridis
Substitutes:
FW	?	(Greece) Nikos Kousidis	(substituted on) 53'
FW	?	(Greece) Sokratis Evangelou	(substituted on) 76'
MF	?	(Greece) Nikolaos Gyftokostas	(substituted on) 74'
Manager:
(Greece) Nikos Theodosiadis

GK	?	(Greece) Timotheos Loutriotis
DF	?	(Greece) Konstantinos Provydakis
DF	?	(Greece) Anastasios Tsoumagas
DF	?	(Greece) Labros Kefaloukos
DF	?	(Greece) Manolis Kandilakis
DF	?	(Greece) Konstantinos Balafas
MF	?	(Greece) Evangelos Moraitis	(yellow card) 64'	(substituted off) 87'
MF	?	(Greece) Michail Fragoulakis	(yellow card) 14'
MF	?	(Greece) Dimitrios Kiliaras	(substituted off) 90'
FW	?	(Greece) Nikolaos Bernidakis	(substituted off) 72'
FW	?	(Cyprus) Achilleas Achilleos	(yellow card) 27'
Substitutes:
DF	?	(Greece) Vasilios Babis	(substituted on) 87'
FW	?	(Greece) Georgios Mylonas	(substituted on) 72'
MF	?	(Greece) Vasilios Papadakis	(substituted on) 90'
Manager:
(Greece) Lefteris Vasiliadis

Match officials:

- Assistant referees:
  - Maria Detsi (Athens)
  - Theodoros Gournias (East Attica)
- Fourth official: Andreas Vlachos (East Attica)

Match rules

- 90 minutes
- 30 minutes extra-time if the scores still level
- Penalty shoot-out if scores still level
- Six named substitutes, of which three may be used

2017 Amateurs' Super Cup

Irodotos
1st Title
