= Tympaki F.C. =

Association football club in Greece

A.O. Tympaki
- Full name: Athlitikos Omilos Tympaki
- Founded: 1965; 61 years ago
- Ground: Tympaki Municipal Ground
- Capacity: 700
- Chairman: Antonios Lamprakis
- Manager: Nikolaos Soutzis
- League: Gamma Ethniki
- 2025–26: Heraklion FCA First Division, 3rd (promoted)
Home colours	Away colours

Athlitikos Omilos Tympaki (Greek: Αθλητικός Όμιλος Τυμπακίου) is a Greek football club based in Tympaki, Heraklion, Crete. The official foundation year of the club is 1965, and its official colors are black and white.

== History ==
Athlitikos Omilos Tympaki was founded in 1965, with the club's first official statute drafted by Giorgos Tavernarakis.

In 1985, 20 years after its foundation, A.O.T. won the 2nd group championship of the Heraklion FCA First Division; however, it was subsequently defeated by Atsalenios in the title play-off match, losing the overall Heraklion FCA championship title and the opportunity for promotion to the National Amateur Division (4th tier). In 1992, the club was crowned EPS Heraklion champion and earned promotion to the Delta Ethniki, competing there for the first time in the 1992–93 season before suffering relegation. In 1994, it won the Heraklion FCA championship once again, securing promotion back to Delta Ethniki for its second appearance in the 1994–95 season, though it was again unable to avoid relegation.

In 2005, Tympaki was crowned Heraklion FCA champion and once again won promotion to the Delta Ethniki. This time, it remained in the 4th national tier for three consecutive seasons, from 2005–06 to 2007–08. In 2022, after finishing top of the table with 76 points, the club was crowned Heraklion FCA champion for the first time in 17 years, earning a place in the promotion play-offs for the Gamma Ethniki. In its debut appearance in the Gamma Ethniki during the 2022–23 season, A.O.T. was unable to maintain its position and suffered relegation. Following a one-year absence from the top tier of the Heraklion FCA, the club returned to the First Division and, despite challenges regarding the national sports registry, won the Heraklion FCA championship for the 2023–24 season. It finished top of the A1 table with 76 points—matching its tally from the 2021–22 title-winning campaign—recording 25 wins, 1 draw, and 4 losses to finish four points ahead of runners-up Irodotos. By winning this championship, the club once again secured its participation in the special amateur promotion play-offs, through which it achieved its return to the Gamma Ethniki after a one-year absence.

In the 2024–25 season, the club was once again unable to remain in the Gamma Ethniki and ultimately returned to the local championship. The following season (2025–26), it finished 3rd in the Heraklion FCA First Division standings, securing its third promotion to the Gamma Ethniki within five years.

== Honours ==
=== Regional ===
- Heraklion FCA First Division
  - Winners (5): 1991–92, 1993–94, 2004–05, 2021–22, 2023–24
- Heraklion FCA Super Cup
  - Winners (1): 2024
