= Arcadia Football Clubs Association =

Association football governing body in Arcadia Prefecture, Greece

- Full name: Arcadia Football Clubs Association; Greek: Ένωση Ποδοσφαιρικών Σωματείων Αρκαδίας
- Short name: Arcadia F.C.A.; Greek: Ε.Π.Σ. Αρκαδίας
- Founded: 1953; 73 years ago
- Headquarters: Tripoli, Greece
- FIFA affiliation: Hellenic Football Federation
- President: Stavros Georgopoulos
- Website: epsarkadias.gr

Arcadia Football Clubs Association (Greek: Ένωση Ποδοσφαιρικών Σωματείων Αρκαδίας) is an association football organization in Arcadia Prefecture that is part of the Hellenic Football Federation.

Its headquarters is located in the subregional capital city of Tripoli and the organization has about 50 clubs. Basic organizations of the union is local soccer championships into three divisions and the Arcadia Cup, in which teams from local divisions, and body-member of clubs playing in the higher divisions.

The winner of the first division used to head to the National Fourth Division. As of 2012–13, the winner of the first division plays vs. three other prefectures in a 6-game home and away playoff with the winner of that after-season tournament advancing to Football League 2 (Greece).

The cup winner of Arkadia participates into the Greek Amateur Cup.

for many years, there were three divisions. As of 2012–13, there is no third division as the second division is composed of two groups. At the end of the season, the winner of each second division group plays the second place team of the other group to determine who gets promoted to the first division.

The union also organizes matches for the youth and adult competition, women take part in the 'Arcadia FCA Mixed Competition which plays games with other mixed associations and organizations.

The association awards each year a reward to the greatest scorer and the Characteristic Cup' in teams with the highest points "fair play" of each category

== Divisions (2026–27) ==
The 2026–27 season features the following teams:

=== First division ===
Premier Division
AEK Tripoli
AO Neoi Tripoli
Apollon Tyros
Dimitsana
Ermis Meligous
Iraklis Vervena
Leonidio
Panarkadikos
Tegea

=== Second division ===
Second Division
Apollon Tyros B
Doxa Megalopoli
Elpida Tripoli
Mantineiakos
Nestani
Nikitaras Doliana
Orchomenos Levidi
Panthyreatikos B
Vrasies

== League ==
=== Organization ===
The structure of the championship of Arcadia Football Clubs Association is consisted of 2 divisions:

- A Category
- B Category

=== List of Champions ===
Season	Winner
1953–54	Panarkadikos
1954–55	Panarkadikos
1955–56	Atromitos Tripoli
1956–57	Asteras Tripolis
1957–58	Asteras Tripolis
1958–59	Asteras Tripolis
1959–60	Asteras Tripolis
1960–61	Asteras Tripolis
1961–62	Aris Tripoli
1962–63	Panarkadikos
1963–64	AO Tripoli
1964–65	Panarkadikos
1965–66	Aris/Atromitos Tripoli
1966–67	Ermis Merkovouni
1967–68	Arkadikos
1968–69	Panarkadikos
1969–70	Ermis Merkovouni
1970–71	Panthyreatikos
1971–72	Leonidio
1972–73	Panarkadikos
1973–74	Leonidio
1974–75	AEK Tripoli
1975–76	AEK Tripoli
1976–77	Doxa Megalopoli
1977–78	AEK Tripoli
1978–79	Doxa Megalopoli
1979–80	Anagennisi Tripoli
1980–81	Doxa Megalopoli
1981–82	Leonidio
1982–83	Doxa Megalopoli
1983–84	Leonidio
1984–85	Anagennisi Tripoli
1985–86	Doxa Megalopoli
1986–87	AEK Tripoli
1987–88	Asteras Tripolis
1988–89	AEK Tripoli
1989–90	Asteras Tripolis
1990–91	Leonidio
1991–92	Panthyreatikos
1992–93	Doxa Megalopoli
1993–94	Vrasies
1994–95	Doxa Megalopoli
1995–96	Panarkadikos
1996–97	Leonidio
1997–98	Panthyreatikos
1998–99	AO Tripoli
1999–00	Panthyreatikos
2000–01	AO Tripoli
2001–02	Panarkadikos
2002–03	Asteras Tripolis
2003–04	Pangortyniakos
2004–05	Panthyreatikos
2005–06	Doxa Megalopoli
2006–07	Nestani
2007–08	Ermis Meligous
2008–09	Vrasies
2009–10	Panarkadikos
2010–11	Tegea
2011–12	Panarkadikos
2012–13	Falaisia
2013–14	Panthyreatikos
2014–15	Panthyreatikos
2015–16	Doxa Megalopoli
2016–17	Leonidio
2017–18	Panthyreatikos
2018–19	AEK Tripoli
2019–20	Ermis Meligous
2020–21	Cancelled
2021–22	Panthyreatikos
2022–23	Leonidio
2023–24	Panarkadikos
2024–25	Ermis Meligous
2025–26	Panthyreatikos

=== Performance by club ===
Club	Titles	Winning seasons
Panarkadikos	11	1954, 1955, 1963, 1965, 1969, 1973, 1996, 2002, 2010, 2012, 2024
Panthyreatikos	10	1971, 1992, 1998, 2000, 2005, 2014, 2015, 2018, 2022, 2026
Doxa Megalopoli	9	1977, 1979, 1981, 1983, 1986, 1993, 1995, 2006, 2016
Asteras Tripolis	8	1957, 1958, 1959, 1960, 1961, 1988, 1990, 2003
Leonidio	8	1972, 1974, 1982, 1984, 1991, 1997, 2017, 2023
AEK Tripoli	6	1975, 1976, 1978, 1987, 1989, 2019
Ermis Meligous	3	2008, 2020, 2025
Aris Tripoli	2	1962, 1966
Ermis Merkovouni	2	1967, 1970
Anagennisi Tripoli	2	1980, 1985
AO Tripoli 2000	2	1999, 2001
Vrasies	2	1994, 2009
Atromitos Tripoli	1	1956
AO Tripoli	1	1964
Arkadikos	1	1968
Pangortyniakos	1	2004
Nestani	1	2007
Tegea	1	2011
Falaisia	1	2013

== Cup ==
=== Cup Winners ===
Season	Winner
1971–72	Ermis Merkovouni
1972–73	Panarkadikos
1973–74	Leonidio
1974–75	Panarkadikos
1975–76	Vrasies
1976–77	Leonidio
1977–78	Doxa Megalopoli
1978–79	Doxa Megalopoli
1979–80	Leonidio
1980–81	Doxa Megalopoli
1981–82	Panarkadikos
1982–83	Anagennisi Tripoli
1983–84	Dimitsana
1984–85	Leonidio
1985–86	AEK Tripoli
1986–87	Anagennisi Tripoli
1987–88	AEK Tripoli
1988–89	Asteras Tripolis
1989–90	Asteras Tripolis
1990–91	Leonidio
1991–92	Panarkadikos
1992–93	AEK Tripoli
1993–94	Doxa Megalopoli
1994–95	Panthyreatikos
1995–96	Doxa Megalopoli
1996–97	Panthyreatikos
1997–98	Leonidio
1998–99	Leonidio
1999–00	AO Tripoli
2000–01	Doxa Megalopoli
2001–02	Iraklis Vervena
2002–03	Iraklis Vervena
2003–04	Asteras Tripolis
2004–05	Asteras Tripolis
2005–06	Doxa Megalopoli
2006–07	Doxa Megalopoli
2007–08	Leonidio
2008–09	Ermis Meligous
2009–10	Tegea
2010–11	Panarkadikos
2011–12	Vrasies
2012–13	Panarkadikos
2013–14	AEK Tripoli
2014–15	Panthyreatikos
2015–16	Panarkadikos
2016–17	Leonidio
2017–18	Panarkadikos
2018–19	Leonidio
2019–20	Panarkadikos
2020–21	Cancelled
2021–22	Ermis Meligous
2022–23	Dimitsana
2023–24	Panarkadikos
2024–25	Ermis Meligous
2025–26	Ermis Meligous

=== Performance by club ===
Club	Titles	Winning seasons
Leonidio	10	1974, 1977, 1980, 1985, 1991, 1998, 1999, 2008, 2017, 2019
Panarkadikos	10	1973, 1975, 1982, 1992, 2011, 2013, 2016, 2018, 2021, 2024
Doxa Megalopoli	8	1978, 1979, 1981, 1994, 1996, 2001, 2006, 2007
Asteras Tripolis	4	1989, 1990, 2004, 2005
AEK Tripoli	4	1986, 1988, 1993, 2014
Ermis Meligous	4	2009, 2022, 2025, 2026
Panthyreatikos	3	1995, 1997, 2015
Anagennisi Tripoli	2	1983, 1987
Iraklis Vervena	2	2002, 2003
Vrasies	2	1976, 2012
Dimitsana	2	1984, 2023
Ermis Merkovouni	1	1972
AO Tripoli	1	2000
Tegea	1	2010

== Super Cup ==
=== Finals ===
Season	Winner	Runner-up	Score
2018	Panarkadikos	Panthyreatikos	2–0
2022	Panthyreatikos	Ermis Meligous	3–2
2023	Leonidio	Dimitsana	2–0

== Teams in higher divisions ==
In the 2026–27 season, the following clubs from Arcadia take part in higher divisions:

- Super League Greece:
  - Asteras Tripolis
- Third Division:
  - Panthyreatikos
