= Lazaros Fotias =

Greek footballer (born 1991)

Personal information
- Full name: Lazaros Fotias
- Date of birth: 26 April 1991 (age 35)
- Place of birth: Giannitsa, Greece
- Height: 1.90 m (6 ft 3 in)
- Position: Centre back

Team information
- Current team: Olympos Kerkyra

Youth career
- Iraklis

Senior career*
Years	Team	Apps	(Gls)
2010–2011	Pontioi Katerini	22	(2)
2011–2012	AEL	6	(0)
2012–2013	Epanomi	8	(0)
2013–2015	Parma	0	(0)
2013	→ Kaposvár (loan)	18	(3)
2013–2014	→ Zakynthos (loan)	22	(1)
2014–2015	Zakynthos	10	(0)
2015	Anagennisi Karditsa	14	(0)
2015–2016	Panegialios	15	(1)
2016–2017	Oborishte	8	(0)
2017	Topvar Topoľčany	14	(0)
2017	Edessaikos	7	(0)
2017–2018	AE Lefkimmi	17	(1)
2018	Asteras Petriti		
2019	Thyella Sarakinon		
2019–	Olympos Kerkyra		
Total		137	(7)
- * Club domestic league appearances and goals as of 16 April 2017

Lazaros Fotias (Greek: Λάζαρος Φωτιάς; born 26 April 1991) is a Greek professional footballer who plays as a centre back for Olympos Kerkyra.

== Career ==
He started his career from Iraklis. On 10 August 2011, he signed a 1+3 years contract with Greek Football League club AEL after having a successful season with Football League 2 (Greece) team Pontioi Katerini F.C. In July 2012, he moved to Anagennisi Epanomi F.C. In March 2017, Fotias joined Slovak club Topvar Topoľčany.

In June 2019, Fotias joined Olympos Kerkyra.
