= Heraklion Football Clubs Association =

Association football governing body in Heraklion Prefecture, Greece

- Full name: Heraklion Football Clubs Association; Greek: Ένωση Ποδοσφαιρικών Σωματείων Ηρακλείου
- Short name: Heraklion F.C.A.; Greek: Ε.Π.Σ. Ηρακλείου
- Founded: 1929; 97 years ago
- Headquarters: Heraklion, Greece
- FIFA affiliation: Hellenic Football Federation
- President: Nikolaos Tzortzoglou
- Website: epsirak.gr

Heraklion Football Clubs Association (Greek: Ένωση Ποδοσφαιρικών Σωματείων Ηρακλείου) is a governing body responsible for administering association football in Heraklion Prefecture. It is based in the city of Heraklion and is a member of the Hellenic Football Federation. The association is responsible for organizing regional Championship and Cup competitions for both adult and youth teams playing in its divisions.

The association is currently one of the largest Football Clubs Associations in Greece, consisting of over 85 clubs. Its colors are blue and white and its crest features a Griffin, the official seal of the Municipality of Heraklion.

== History ==
During 1925−1929, Heraklion football was dominated by the two major sporting clubs of the time, EGOI (est. 1924) and OFI (est. 1925). In the autumn of 1926, the first football league in Heraklion was organized and held with a limited number of participants, mainly feeder clubs for EGOI and OFI. This first, informal competition was won by EGOI, and was organized again two years later in 1928, when it was won by OFI. In the meantime, several initiatives for the establishment of football clubs that would compete with OFI and EGOI were carried out during 1928−1932. This rapid establishment of football clubs during 1925−1931 (e.g. Ergotelis and Olympiakos Heraklion in 1929, Iraklis Heraklion in 1930 and Ermis in 1932) birthed the need to create a governing body for the coordination and organization of football clubs and competitions. Therefore, the Cretan Football Association was established in 1929. Two years later, and after several disputes over administration issues among the founding members, the union was reformed into the Heraklion Football Clubs Association, which was granted the full administrative and organizational control over the football events in the regions of Heraklion and Lasithi. The association was officially recognized by the HFF in 1931.

== Football League System ==
Heraklion FCA Football Leagues
- First season: 1928–29
- Divisions: 4
- Level on pyramid: 4–7
- Promotion to: Gamma Ethniki
- Domestic cup: Heraklion FCA Cup
- Current champions: Ergotelis (8th title) (2025–26)
- Most championships: OFI (18 titles)
- Broadcaster: Kriti TV (Highlights)
- Website: http://epsirak.gr/ (in Greek)
- Current: 2025–26

The Heraklion FCA football league system consists of four divisions, namely the A1 Division (Greek: Α1 ΕΠΣΗ), the top-level football league in Heraklion (therefore also known as the Heraklion FCA Championship), the Α2 Division (Greek: Α2 ΕΠΣΗ), second tier in the pyramid, the B Division (Greek: Β ΕΠΣΗ) comprising two Groups and constituting the third tier of the league system and finally the C Division (Greek: Γ ΕΠΣΗ), lowest regional division organized in Heraklion.

From its foundation to 1959 (they year of the foundation of the nationwide championship of the Alpha Ethniki), the Heraklion FCA organised a league that was considered the top tier of football in Crete, and later specifically the region of Heraklion (after Chania, Lasithi and Rethymno founded Football Clubs Associations of their own.

=== 2018−19 season ===
The following teams compete in the Heraklion FCA Championships during the 2018–19 season. The winner of the A1 Division Championship earns promotion to the Gamma Ethniki, the third tier of the Greek football league system.

==== A1 Division ====
Location of teams in 2018−19 Heraklion FCA A1 Division

Team	Location	Stadium	Capacity	Last season
A.E. Katsampas	Karteros	AEK Stadium	N/A	A1, 8th
Agia Varvara	Agia Varvara	Agia Varvara Stadium	N/A	A2, 2nd
Almyros	Gazi	Almyros Stadium	N/A	A1, 7th
AO Tympaki	Tympaki	Tympaki Stadium	1,000	A1, 5th
Anthestion	Thrapsano	Thrapsano Stadium	N/A	A1, 4th
Faistos	Voroi	Voroi Stadium	N/A	A1, 14th
Gortys	Agioi Deka	Agioi Deka Stadium	N/A	A1, 9th
Minoiki Heraklion	Fortetsa	Heraklion University Stadium	N/A	A1, 3rd
Moires	Moires	Moires Stadium	N/A	A1, 6th
P.A.O. Krousonas	Krousonas	Krousonas Municipal Stadium	1,500	A1, 13th
PANO Malia	Malia	Malia Stadium	N/A	A1, 2nd
AO Poros	Poros, Heraklion	Nikos Kazantzakis Stadium	600	A2, 1st
Romanos Elia	Elia	Elia Stadium	N/A	A1, 11th
Tritonia Astritsi	Astritsi	Astritsi Stadium	N/A	A2, 3rd
Tylissos	Tylissos	Tylissos Stadium	N/A	A1, 11th
Zaros	Zaros	Zaros Stadium	N/A	A1, 10th

==== A2 Division ====
Club Name
AO Asimi
AO Damasta
AO Dias
AO Kaminia
Athlopolis
Diagoras Anopoli
Elpides Karteros
Iraklis Nipiditos
Keravnos Heraklion
Lido
Marathon Kalesa
Neoi Ergoteli
O.F. Arkalochori
Chersonissos
PAO Gouves
Rouvas

==== B Division ====
Group 1	Group 2
AO Garipa	Agios Dimitrios
AO Voni	AO Metaxochori
Charavgi Nea Alikarnassos	AO Pyrgiotissa
Doxa Heraklion	Asites
Dorieas Kastelli	Chimaros Choustouliana
Ethnikos Heraklion	EGOI
Ermis Atsalenio	Dafnes Temenos
Kanaria Ergoteli	Neoi Almyros
Mochos	OFAM
NA.PO Poseidon Heraklion	Paliani 2008
Neoi Irodotou	PAO Dilina
Neoi Minoikis	Rafkos
Omonoia Kallithea	Therissos 1978
Pigassos	−

==== C Division ====
Club Name
Aetos Anogeia
AO Ini
AO Kounavoi
AO Tiganitis
Alogo Malevizi
Elpides Irodotou
Giouchtas 2010
Koroivos
Martinengo
Neoi Moires
PAO Rodia
Panathinaikos Heraklion
Patouchas Viannos

=== List of Champions ===
==== Informal (prior to the FCA) ====
Season	Champion(s)
1925−26	EGOI
1926−27	Not held
1927−28	OFI
1928−29	OFI
1929−30	EGOI

==== Formal FCA Championship (1930−1959) ====
Season	Champion(s)
1930−31	OFI
1931−32	OFI, EGOI
1932−33	OFI
1933−34	EGOI
1934−35	OFI
1935−36	Not held
1936−37	Iraklis Heraklion
1937−38	EGOI
1938−39	Νo data available
1939−40	Not finished due to World War II

Season	Champion(s)
1940−41	Not held
1941−42	Not held
1942−43	Not held
1943−44	Not held
1944−45	Not held
1945−46	Iraklis Heraklion
1946−47	Νo data available
1947−48	OFI
1948−49	OFI
1949−50	Ergotelis

Season	Champion(s)
1950−51	EGOI
1951−52	OFI
1952−53	Ergotelis
1953−54	OFI
1954−55	OFI
1955−56	OFI
1956−57	OFI
1957−58	OFI
1958−59	OFI

==== FCA Championship A1 Division (1959−current) ====
Season	Champion(s)
1959−60	OFI
1960−61	OFI
1961−62	OFI
1962−63	Atsalenios
1963−64	Ergotelis
1964−65	Irodotos
1965−66	Atsalenios
1966−67	No data available
1967−68	Ergotelis
1968−69	Irodotos
1969−70	Ergotelis
1970−71	Atsalenios
1971−72	Irodotos
1972−73	N.A.P.O. Poseidon Heraklion
1973−74	Atsalenios

Season	Champion(s)
1974−75	Ergotelis
1975−76	Irodotos
1976−77	Ergotelis
1977−78	No data available
1978−79	No data available
1979−80	AO Agios Nikolaos^{1}
1980−81	N.A.P.O. Poseidon Heraklion
1981−82	No data available
1982−83	EGOI
1983−84	N.A.P.O. Poseidon Heraklion
1984−85	Atsalenios, AO Tympaki
1985−86	N.A.P.O. Poseidon Heraklion, Tylissos
1986−87	Minoiki Heraklion
1987−88	Atsalenios
1988−89	N.A.P.O. Poseidon Heraklion

Season	Champion(s)
1989−90	EGOI
1990−91	A.E. Katsampas
1991−92	AO Tympaki
1992−93	Olympiakos Chersonissos
1993−94	AO Tympaki
1994−95	Atsalenios
1995−96	PANO Malia
1996−97	Atsalenios
1997−98	PANO Malia
1998−99	OFI '94
1999−2000	Olympiakos Chersonissos
2000−01	Irodotos
2001−02	Irodotos
2002−03	Minoiki Heraklion
2003−04	A.E. Katsampas

Season	Champion(s)
2004−05	AO Tympaki
2005−06	P.A.O. Krousonas
2006−07	Mochos
2007−08	Asites
2008−09	Rouvas
2009−10	Asites
2010−11	Zaros
2011−12	A.E. Katsampas
2012−13	Zaros
2013−14	Zaros
2014−15	Rouvas, Atsalenios
2015−16	Irodotos, Atsalenios
2016−17	Irodotos
2017−18	Giouchtas
2018−19	Poros
2019−20	Damasta
2020−21	cancelled
2021−22	AO Tympaki
2022−23	Atsalenios
2023−24	AO Tympaki
2024−25	Irodotos
2025−26	Ergotelis

=== Performance by club (1925−) ===
Club	Titles	Years
OFI	18	1928, 1929, 1931, 1932, 1933, 1935, 1948, 1949, 1952, 1954, 1955, 1956, 1957, 1958, 1959, 1960, 1961, 1962
Atsalenios	11	1963, 1966, 1971, 1974, 1978, 1985, 1988, 1995, 1997, 2016, 2023
EGOI	8	1926, 1930, 1932, 1934, 1938, 1951, 1983, 1990
Ergotelis	8	1950, 1953, 1964, 1968, 1970, 1975, 1977, 2026
Irodotos	8	1965, 1969, 1972, 1976, 2001, 2002, 2017, 2025
N.A.P.O. Poseidon Heraklion	5	1973, 1981, 1984, 1986, 1989
AO Tympaki	5	1992, 1994, 2005, 2022, 2024
A.E. Katsampas	3	1991, 2004, 2012
Zaros	3	2011, 2013, 2014
Iraklis Heraklion	2	1937, 1946
Minoiki Heraklion	2	1987, 2003
Olympiakos Chersonissos	2	1993, 2000
PANO Malia	2	1996, 1998
Asites	2	2008, 2010
Rouvas	2	2009, 2015
AO Agios Nikolaos^{1}	1	1980
OFI '94	1	1999
P.A.O. Krousonas	1	2006
Mochos	1	2007
Giouchtas	1	2018
Poros	1	2019
Damasta	1	2020

1. Currently a member of the Lasithi Football Clubs Association.

== Cup ==
Heraklion FCA Cup
- Founded: 1971
- Related competitions: Greek Football Amateur Cup
- Current champions: Hersonissos (2nd title)
- Most championships: Atsalenios (12 titles)
- Broadcaster: Kriti TV (Highlights)
- 2025–26

The Heraklion FCA Cup (Greek: Κύπελλο ΕΠΣΗ) is a football competition in which the clubs competing in any of the Heraklion FCA Football Leagues participate. The competition was founded in 1971, and has since been held annually. As of 2018, the winner of the FCA Cup becomes eligible to participate in next year's Greek Football Cup competition.

=== Format ===
The current format features a minimum of 60 clubs. Participation of the teams competing in the A1 and A2 FCA Divisions along with the registered members of the FCA competing in the Gamma Ethniki is mandatory. Optionally, clubs competing in the FCA B and C Division may also participate, along with amateur outfits of professional registered members of the FCA. Teams are drawn at random to compete in single knockout matches, in which the club being drawn first is declared the home team. In case of a match-up between clubs playing at different competition levels, the club playing in the lower Division is declared the home team instead. This format is followed until the Semi-finals of the competition.

The Semi-finals are contested in double knock-out matches between the 4 remaining teams, and match-ups are determined by random draw. The two pairs of teams play each other home and away. In this case, away goals rule is in effect on the qualification, without however excluding the possibility for extra time or penalty shootout in the second leg.

The competition Final is contested by the qualifying teams of the Semi-finals. The Final is single match. In case of a draw, extra time is not held, but the winner is declared in an immediate penalty shootout.

=== List of Heraklion FCA Cup Winners ===
Season	Champion(s)
1971−72	N.A.P.O. Poseidon Heraklion
1972−73	N.A.P.O. Poseidon Heraklion
1973−74	N.A.P.O. Poseidon Heraklion
1974−75	Atsalenios
1975−76	Irodotos
1976−77	Ergotelis
1977−78	Atsalenios
1978−79	EGOI
1979−80	AO Agios Nikolaos^{1}
1980−81	Ergotelis
1981−82	Ergotelis
1982−83	Ergotelis
1983−84	Atsalenios
1984−85	Ergotelis
1985−86	Atsalenios
1986−87	Atsalenios

Season	Champion(s)
1987−88	Minoiki Heraklion
1988−89	EGOI
1989−90	N.A.P.O. Poseidon Heraklion
1990−91	Atsalenios
1991−92	AO Asimi
1992−93	AO Asimi
1993−94	AO Asimi
1994−95	Irodotos
1995−96	Ergotelis
1996−97	Atsalenios
1997−98	Atsalenios
1998−99	Olympiakos Chersonissos
1999−00	PANO Malia
2000−01	Atsalenios
2001−02	Irodotos
2002−03	Atsalenios

Season	Champion(s)
2003−04	OFI Amateurs
2004−05	Almyros
2005−06	Irodotos
2006−07	PANO Malia
2007−08	Irodotos
2008−09	Giouchtas
2009−10	Giouchtas
2010−11	Rouvas
2011−12	Patouchas Viannos
2012−13	Irodotos
2013−14	Almyros
2014−15	Atsalenios
2015−16	Irodotos
2016−17	Irodotos
2017−18	PANO Malia
2018−19	Atsalenios
2019–20	PANO Malia
2020–21	Not held
2021–22	Almyros
2022–23	PAO Krousonas
2023–24	Almyros
2024–25	Giouchtas
2025–26	Olympiakos Chersonissos

=== Performance by Club (1971−) ===
Club	Titles	Years
Atsalenios	12	1975, 1978, 1984, 1986, 1987, 1991, 1997, 1998, 2001, 2003, 2015, 2019
Irodotos	8	1976, 1995, 2002, 2006, 2008, 2013, 2016, 2017
Ergotelis	6	1977, 1981, 1982, 1983, 1985, 1996
N.A.P.O. Poseidon Heraklion	4	1972, 1973, 1974, 1990
PANO Malia	4	2000, 2007, 2018, 2020
Almyros	4	2005, 2014, 2022, 2024
Giouchtas	3	2009, 2010, 2025
AO Asimi	3	1992, 1993, 1994
EGOI	2	1979, 1989
Olympiakos Chersonissos	2	1999, 2026
ΑΟ Agios Nikolaos^{1}	1	1980
Minoiki Heraklion	1	1988
OFI Amateurs	1	2004
Rouvas	1	2011
Patouchas Viannos	1	2012
PAO Krousonas	1	2023

1. Currently a member of the Lasithi Football Clubs Association.

== Super Cup ==
Heraklion FCA Super Cup
- Sport: Football
- Founded: 2010
- No. of teams: 2
- Country: Greece
- Most recent champion: Ergotelis (1st title)
- Most titles: Atsalenios (4 titles)

The Heraklion FCA Super Cup (Greek: Σούπερ Καπ ΕΠΣΗ) is a football one match competition, which is contested annually by the Heraklion FCA A1 Division champion, and the winners of the Heraklion FCA Cup. In case of a double winner, the Super Cup is contested between the winner and runner-up of the FCA Cup.

=== The matches ===
Season	Winner	Score	Runner-up	Venue
2010	Giouchtas	2–1	Asites	Nikos Kazantzakis Stadium
2011	Rouvas	4–1	Zaros	Moires Stadium
2012	A.E. Katsampas	2–1	Patouchas Viannos	Nikos Kazantzakis Stadium
2013	Irodotos	3–1	Zaros	Nikos Kazantzakis Stadium
2014	Zaros	2–2 (5-3 pen.)	Almyros Gazi	Atsalenios Stadium
2015	Atsalenios	1–0	Rouvas	Nea Alikarnassos Municipal Stadium
2016	Atsalenios	2–1	Irodotos	Pankritio Stadium
2017	Irodotos	2–1	Zaros	Nikos Kazantzakis Stadium
2018	PANO Malia	1–1 (4-2 pen.)	Giouchtas	Arkalochori Municipal Stadium
2019	Atsalenios	3–2	Poros	Damasta Municipal Stadium
2023	Atsalenios	1–0	PAO Krousonas	Asimi Municipal Stadium
2024	AO Tympaki	3–0	Almyros Gazi	Atsalenios Stadium
2026	Ergotelis	4–2	Hersonissos	Gazi Municipal Stadium

== Heraklion FCA Clubs National Titles & honours ==
=== Contemporary ===
- Greek Cup Winners: (2)
  - OFI (2): 1986–87, 2025–26
- Greek Super Cup Winners: (1)
  - OFI (1): 2026
- Second Division Winners: (4)
  - OFI (3): 1965–66, 1975–76, 2017–18
  - Ergotelis (1): 2005–06
- Gamma Ethniki Winners: (6)
  - Ergotelis (2): 1965–66, 2016–17
  - OFI (1): 2015–16
  - Irodotos (1): 2017–18
  - O.F. Ierapetra (1): 2018–19
  - Giouchtas (1): 2022–23
- Greek Amateur Cup Winners: (4)
  - Ergotelis (1): 1982−83
  - PANO Malia (1): 1999−2000
  - Irodotos (1): 2016−17
  - O. F. Ierapetra (1): 2017−18
- Amateurs' Super Cup Winners: (1)
  - Irodotos (1): 2016–17

=== Defunct ===
- Delta Ethniki Winners: (9)
  - Ergotelis (2): 1984–85, 1995–96
  - Irodotos (2): 1991−92, 2003–04
  - Atsalenios (2): 2002−03, 2012–13
  - Poseidon Heraklion (1): 1990–91
  - Olympiakos Chersonissos (1): 2007−08
  - Rouvas (1): 2010−11

== Heraklion FCA clubs in European competitions ==
Club	UEFA Champions League (Since 1955–56)	UEFA Europa League (Since 1971–72)	UEFA Cup Winners' Cup (1960–1999)	UEFA Intertoto Cup (1961–2008)	Balkans Cup (1961–1994)	Total	Last appearance
OFI	0	6	1	2	2	11	2026–27 UEFA Europa League
Total	0	6	1	2	2	11	

== Heraklion FCA Clubs European Titles & honours ==
=== Defunct ===
- Balkans Cup Winners: (1)
  - OFI: 1989
