= 2004–05 Gamma Ethniki =

Gamma Ethniki
- Season: 2004–05
- Champions: Thrasyvoulos (South); Veria (North)
- Promoted: Thrasyvoulos; Chaidari; Veria
- Relegated: Pamisos Messini; PANO Malia; Irodotos Athinais Marko; Pavlos Melas Stavroupoli; Pandramaikos; Apollon Larissa; ILTEX Lykoi

The 2004–05 Gamma Ethniki was the 22nd season since the official establishment of the third tier of Greek football in 1983. Thrasyvoulos and Veria were crowned champions in Southern and Northern Group respectively, thus winning promotion to Beta Ethniki. Chaidari also won promotion as a best runner-up of the two groups.

Pamisos Messini, PANO Malia, Irodotos, Athinais, Marko, Pavlos Melas, Pandramaikos, Apollon Larissa and ILTEX Lykoi were relegated to Delta Ethniki.

== Southern Group ==
=== League table ===
Location of teams in South Group of 2004–05 Gamma Ethniki

Pos	Team	Pld	W	D	L	GF	GA	GD	Pts	Promotion or relegation
1	Thrasyvoulos (C, P)	32	20	11	1	59	23	+36	71	Promotion to Beta Ethniki
2	Chaidari (P)	32	21	4	7	58	27	+31	67	Promotion to Beta Ethniki
3	Acharnaikos	32	18	9	5	50	26	+24	63	
4	Ethnikos Piraeus	32	18	8	6	43	24	+19	62	
5	Rodos	32	14	6	12	28	25	+3	48	
6	Lilas Vasilikou	32	11	8	13	32	36	−4	41	
7	Agios Dimitrios	32	10	10	12	42	36	+6	40	
8	Atsalenios	32	10	10	12	28	36	−8	40	
9	Achaiki	32	10	10	12	44	54	−10	40	
10	Thyella Patras	32	9	12	11	36	38	−2	39	
11	Keratsini (Note: Keratsini had 1 point deducted.)	32	10	10	12	36	37	−1	39	
12	Vyzas	32	9	12	11	31	33	−2	39	
13	Pamisos Messini (R)	32	11	4	17	28	44	−16	37	Relegation to Delta Ethniki
14	PANO Malia (R)	32	9	8	15	30	41	−11	35	Relegation to Delta Ethniki
15	Irodotos (R)	32	7	8	17	21	39	−18	29	Relegation to Delta Ethniki
16	Athinais (R)	32	7	6	19	31	55	−24	27	Relegation to Delta Ethniki
17	Marko (R)	32	4	12	16	30	53	−23	24	Relegation to Delta Ethniki

(C) Champions; (P) Promoted; (R) Relegated

=== Results ===
Home \ Away	AHA	ACH	AGD	ATH	ATS	HAI	ETH	IRO	KER	LIL	MAR	PAM	MAL	ROD	THR	THY	VYZ
Achaiki		1–3	2–2	4–1	2–0	1–1	2–2	2–0	2–1	1–0	3–3	1–0	2–5	2–2	1–1	2–1	1–2
Acharnaikos	0–0		2–2	4–0	1–0	1–0	3–2	2–1	3–1	0–0	4–0	3–0	3–1	1–1	0–0	3–1	1–0
Agios Dimitrios	5–0	0–1		2–0	2–0	0–1	0–1	1–2	1–1	1–1	2–0	3–1	1–0	0–0	1–2	5–0	1–1
Athinais	1–2	0–0	1–3		2–0	0–3	2–3	1–3	4–2	0–1	2–1	4–2	5–1	1–2	0–4	2–2	1–1
Atsalenios	2–1	2–1	2–1	1–0		1–3	0–0	3–0	1–2	2–0	2–2	1–1	1–1	1–0	0–0	0–3	1–0
Chaidari	3–1	0–0	2–1	1–2	1–0		2–0	4–0	0–1	2–0	5–1	3–1	3–0	3–1	5–3	2–0	0–0
Ethnikos Piraeus	2–1	1–0	0–0	2–0	2–1	1–1		1–0	0–0	2–0	2–0	3–0	1–0	1–0	1–1	2–1	4–1
Irodotos	0–0	1–1	3–0	0–0	0–0	1–3	1–2		0–1	1–0	1–0	1–0	0–1	0–0	0–1	0–1	0–2
Keratsini	3–0	1–2	2–2	2–0	3–1	0–1	1–1	0–1		2–1	3–1	0–2 (Note: Originally score was 5–1. The game forfeited 2–0 for Pamisos.)	1–1	1–0	0–0	0–2	2–0
Lilas Vasilikou	1–2	3–1	0–0	1–0	2–0	0–2	1–0	4–1	2–2		1–1	2–0	1–0	3–1	2–2	1–0	0–3
Marko	1–0	2–3	1–2	1–1	0–1	0–1	0–2	1–1	0–0	3–2		0–0	1–0	0–1	2–2	1–1	0–1
Pamisos Messini	3–2	0–2	1–0	1–0	0–1	2–3	0–2	2–1	2–1	3–1	2–3		1–0	0–2	0–0	1–0	1–0
PANO Malia	0–1	0–1	1–2	0–1	0–0	1–0	2–1	2–0	3–1	3–1	3–3	0–0		1–0	0–0	0–2	1–0
Rodos	2–0	1–0	1–0	2–0	2–0	1–0	1–0	1–0	0–0	0–1	1–0	0–1	1–1		0–2	2–0	2–0
Thrasyvoulos	0–0	4–2	2–0	3–0	3–3	4–0	1–1	2–1	1–0	1–0	3–1	3–1	2–0	3–0		1–0	2–0
Thyella Patras	3–3	0–1	3–0	0–0	0–0	2–1	2–0	1–1	1–1	0–0	1–1	1–0	2–2	2–1	1–2		1–1
Vyzas	4–2	1–1	2–2	1–0	1–1	1–2	0–1	0–0	1–1	0–0	0–0	1–0	3–0	1–0	1–3	2–2	

Legend: Blue = home team win; Yellow = draw; Red = away team win.

== Northern Group ==
=== League table ===
Location of teams in North Group of 2004–05 Gamma Ethniki

Pos	Team	Pld	W	D	L	GF	GA	GD	Pts	Promotion or relegation
1	Veria (C, P)	32	21	6	5	65	28	+37	69	Promotion to Beta Ethniki
2	PAS Giannina	32	20	5	7	56	29	+27	65	
3	Kavala	32	16	8	8	49	36	+13	56	
4	Anagennisi Arta	32	16	6	10	50	34	+16	54	
5	Kozani	32	15	5	12	40	40	0	50	
6	Lamia	32	15	5	12	45	47	−2	50	
7	Enosi Thrace	32	14	7	11	35	35	0	49	
8	Doxa Drama	32	14	6	12	37	34	+3	48	
9	Panetolikos	32	14	3	15	38	32	+6	45	
10	Agrotikos Asteras	32	12	9	11	47	42	+5	45	
11	Thermaikos	32	11	11	10	35	33	+2	44	
12	Anagennisi Karditsa	32	12	7	13	36	35	+1	43	
13	Ptolemaida	32	11	6	15	22	35	−13	39	
14	Pavlos Melas Stavroupoli (R)	32	10	6	16	34	48	−14	36	Relegation to Delta Ethniki
15	Pandramaikos (R)	32	8	4	20	21	46	−25	28	Relegation to Delta Ethniki
16	Apollon Larissa (R)	32	6	5	21	21	48	−27	23	Relegation to Delta Ethniki
17	ILTEX Lykoi (R)	32	5	5	22	28	57	−29	20	Relegation to Delta Ethniki

(C) Champions; (P) Promoted; (R) Relegated

=== Results ===
Home \ Away	AGR	ART	KRD	APL	DOX	EAL	LYK	KAV	KOZ	LAM	PDR	PAN	PAS	PAV	PTO	THE	VER
Agrotikos Asteras		3–2	0–0	1–0	1–0	3–0	4–1	2–0	3–0	4–1	1–0	0–1	1–3	1–1	2–0	0–0	1–4
Anagennisi Arta	1–1		3–1	1–0	0–2	1–1	3–0	1–1	2–0	1–0	0–0	1–0	2–1	4–1	6–1	2–1	4–2
Anagennisi Karditsa	2–0	1–1		2–0	3–1	1–0	2–0	2–1	3–0	0–2	2–0	2–1	1–1	0–0	1–1	0–0	0–2
Apollon Larissa	0–0	1–0	1–0		0–0	1–2	0–1	1–2	0–1	0–1	5–1	2–1	1–2	1–0	0–1	0–2	0–2
Doxa Drama	1–0	2–1	1–1	3–1		0–1	0–0	2–0	3–0	1–1	0–1	3–2	2–0	1–2	1–0	2–0	2–1
Enosi Thrace	2–2	0–0	2–1	2–0	1–0		2–1	0–1	3–0	2–0	3–0	1–0	1–1	2–1	2–0	0–0	0–0
ILTEX Lykoi	2–1	0–1	1–3	0–1	1–2	4–0		1–2	0–1	1–2	1–4	1–3	1–2	1–3	0–1	2–0	0–2
Kavala	2–2	3–0	3–1	2–2	1–1	2–0	1–1		2–1	4–4	3–1	2–0	2–0	4–1	1–0	3–1	0–2
Kozani	1–2	1–2	0–1	3–1	3–0	0–2	1–1	2–0		3–0	1–0	1–0	4–3	2–1	1–2	2–2	2–2
Lamia	2–1	2–4	1–0	1–1	3–2	2–1	6–1	0–1	2–4		1–0	1–0	1–0	1–0	3–1	2–2	2–0
Pandramaikos	2–2	0–3	1–0	1–0	0–2	0–2	1–0	1–2	0–1	3–1		1–1	0–0	0–1	1–0	0–4	0–1
Panetolikos	5–3	1–0	1–0	4–0	1–0	3–0	0–1	1–2	0–0	2–0	3–0		2–3	1–0	1–0	1–0	1–0
PAS Giannina	2–1	2–0	2–0	6–0	2–0	2–0	2–0	1–0	0–1	4–1	1–0	3–1		3–1	2–1	2–0	2–1
Pavlos Melas	1–2	2–1	3–2	2–0	2–1	1–1	3–3	0–0	0–1	0–2	1–0	2–1	0–0		2–0	1–2	2–3
Ptolemaida	2–1	1–0	0–1	2–1	0–0	1–0	1–1	1–1	0–2	1–0	0–1	1–0	0–1	1–0		2–0	1–1
Thermaikos	1–1	1–2	2–1	1–0	0–1	3–1	1–0	2–0	1–1	0–0	2–1	2–0	2–2	3–0	0–0		0–0
Veria	3–1	2–1	4–2	1–1	5–1	4–1	2–1	2–1	2–0	3–0	2–1	0–0	2–1	4–0	2–0	4–0	

Legend: Blue = home team win; Yellow = draw; Red = away team win.

== Top scorers ==
Rank	Player	Club	Goals
1	(Greece) Georgios Lanaris	Veria	17
1	(Greece) Petros Zouroudis	Panetolikos	17
3	(Greece) Dimitris Diamantis	Chaidari	16
4	(Greece) Dimitris Psychogios	Lamia	14
4	(Greece) Ioannis Thomaidis	Anagennisi Arta	14
4	(Greece) Georgios Kiourkos	Chaidari	14
4	(Greece) Georgios Kontopoulos	Agios Dimitrios	14
