= Christos Theodorakis =

Greek footballer

Personal information
- Date of birth: 17 September 1996 (age 30)
- Place of birth: Ioannina, Greece
- Height: 1.90 m (6 ft 3 in)
- Position: Goalkeeper

Team information
- Current team: Marko
- Number: 1

Youth career
- 2010–2015: Atromitos

Senior career*
Years	Team	Apps	(Gls)
2015–2021	Atromitos	13	(0)
2018	→ Kallithea (loan)	12	(0)
2021–2022	Rodos	22	(0)
2022–2023	Panachaiki	14	(0)
2023–2024	Ypsonas	8	(0)
2024–2025	Anagennisi Arta		
2025–	Marko	9	(1)

International career^{‡}
2015	Greece U19	2	(0)
2017	Greece U21	4	(0)
- * Club domestic league appearances and goals as of 15 March 2026 ‡ National team caps and goals as of 11 January 2019

Christos Theodorakis (Greek: Χρήστος Θεοδωράκης; born 17 September 1996) is a Greek professional footballer who plays as a goalkeeper for Super League 2 club Marko.

He previously played for Cypriot Second Division club Ypsonas.

== Career ==
On 5 June 2019, he signed a contract extension, until the summer of 2022.

== Career statistics ==
=== Club ===
As of 28 May 2021

Club	Season	League			Cup		Continental		Other		Total	
Club	Season	Division	Apps	Goals	Apps	Goals	Apps	Goals	Apps	Goals	Apps	Goals
Atromitos	2016–17	Super League Greece	1	0	0	0	—		—		1	0
Atromitos	2017–18	Super League Greece	0	0	0	0	—		—		0	0
Atromitos	2018–19	Super League Greece	4	0	6	0	—		—		10	0
Atromitos	2019–20	Super League Greece	3	0	0	0	0	0	—		3	0
Atromitos	2020–21	Super League Greece	5	0	0	0	—		—		5	0
Atromitos	Total		13	0	6	0	0	0	—		19	0
Kallithea (loan)	2017–18	Super League Greece 2	12	0	0	0	—		—		12	0
Career total			25	0	6	0	0	0	0	0	31	0
