= Mariano Gerez =

Argentine footballer

Personal information
- Full name: Mariano Rubén Gerez
- Date of birth: 19 January 2006 (age 20)
- Place of birth: Quilmes, Buenos Aires. Argentina
- Height: 1.73 m (5 ft 8 in)
- Position: Defensive midfielder

Team information
- Current team: Marko (on loan from Lanús)
- Number: 22

Youth career
- –2024: Lanús

Senior career*
| Years | Team | Apps | (Gls) |
| 2024– | Lanús | 2 | (0) |
| 2026– | → Marko (loan) | 0 | (0) |

International career
| 2022–2023 | Argentina U17 | 26 | (0) |
| 2024–2025 | Argentina U20 | 13 | (1) |
- * Club domestic league appearances and goals as of 14 August 2026

Mariano Gerez (born January 19, 2006, in Quilmes) is an Argentine footballer who plays a defensive midfielder for the Super League Greece 2 club Marko, on loan from Lanús.

== Club career ==
=== Lanús ===
On October 27, 2024, he made his debut in the first team of Lanús as a starter in the Liga Profesional against Atlético Tucumán.

=== Marko 1927 ===
On 13 August 2026 he joined Greek side Marko 1927 F.C. on a season long loan deal with an option to buy.

== International career ==
=== Under-17 ===
He played in almost all of the matches in the South American U-17 Championship in Ecuador under the management of Diego Placente. In the South American Championship they finished third and were awarded a place to play in the U-17 World Cup in Indonesia.

=== Under-20 ===
In October 2024, he was called up by Javier Mascherano to the Argentina national under-20 football team to play international friendlies.
