= P.A.O. Krousonas F.C. =

PAO Krousonas
- Full name: Ποδοσφαιρικός Αθλητικός Όμιλος Κρουσώνα; Podosfairikós Athlitikós Ómilos Krousóna (Football Athletic Club of Krousonas)
- Short name: PAOK
- Founded: 1968; 58 years ago
- Ground: Krousonas Municipal Stadium
- Capacity: 1,500
- Chairman: Defkalion Steiatakis
- Manager: Tasos Triantafyllou
- League: Heraklion FCA First Division
- 2025−26: Heraklion FCA First Division, 4th
- Website: Official website
Home colours

P.A.O. Krousonas F.C., short for Podosfairikos Athlitikos Omilos Krousona (Greek: Ποδοσφαιρικός Αθλητικός Όμιλος Κρουσώνα, translated Football Athletic Club of Krousonas) and also known simply as PAOK or Krousonas, is a Greek football club, based in Krousonas, Heraklion. The club was founded in 1968, and its colors are black and white. They currently compete in the Heraklion FCA Α1 Division and host their home games in the Krousonas Municipal Stadium.

== History ==
=== Early years and local establishment (1968–2006) ===
From its foundation in 1968, PAO Krousonas competed in the local championships of the Heraklion Football Clubs Association. Step by step, the team managed to play a leading role in the first division of the prefecture, relying mainly on local players and the strong support of the local community of Malevizi.

=== The golden decade in the National Championships (2006–2016) ===
The most successful period in the club's history began in 2006, when it won the Heraklion FCA First Division championship for the first time and earned historical promotion to the national divisions.

- Delta Ethniki (2006–2013): PAO Krousonas competed for seven consecutive seasons in the fourth tier of the national league system, establishing the Krousonas Municipal Stadium as one of the hardest and most formidable home venues in Crete.
- Gamma Ethniki (2013–2016): In the 2012–13 season, following the merger of the divisions, the team achieved promotion to the Gamma Ethniki (third national division). It competed there for three consecutive years, facing major clubs of Greek football such as AEK Athens and OFI (during the 2013–14 season). The club was eventually relegated in 2016, returning to local competitions after exactly 10 consecutive years of presence in the national championships.

=== Return to local leagues and historic cup win (2016–present) ===
Following its return to the Heraklion FCA, PAO Krousonas continued to be one of the traditional forces in the category, frequently mounting championship runs. The greatest moment in its modern history was written during the 2022–23 season. PAO Krousonas reached the final of the Heraklion FCA Cup and won the trophy for the first time in its history, defeating the formidable (and subsequently Gamma Ethniki champion) Giouchtas.

== Honours ==
=== Regional ===
- Heraklion FCA Championship
  - Winners (1): 2005−06
- Heraklion FCA Cup
  - Winners (1): 2022−23
