= Periklis Bousinakis =

Greek footballer (born 1986)

Personal information
- Full name: Periklis Bousinakis
- Date of birth: 23 April 1986 (age 40)
- Place of birth: Volos, Greece
- Height: 1.75 m (5 ft 9 in)
- Position: Attacking midfielder

Team information
- Current team: Ilisiakos

Youth career
- Panathinaikos

Senior career*
Years	Team	Apps	(Gls)
2005–2006	Olympiacos Volos	8	(0)
2006	Apollon Smyrnis	6	(0)
2006–2007	Akademisk Boldklub	9	(1)
2007–2008	Panetolikos	18	(1)
2008–2009	Kerkyra	6	(1)
2009–2010	Ethnikos Piraeus	7	(1)
2010	Panthrakios	5	(0)
2010–2011	Niki Volos	15	(3)
2012–2013	Tyrnavos	10	(2)
2013–2014	Anagennisi Karditsa	12	(1)
2014	AEL	0	(0)
2014	Ermionida	1	(0)
2015	Panelefsiniakos	0	(0)
2015–2016	Karaiskakis	2	(0)
2016–2017	Doxa Drama	0	(0)
2017–2018	Chalkida	0	(0)
2018	Karaiskakis	2	(0)
2018–	Ilisiakos	0	(0)
- * Club domestic league appearances and goals

Periklis Bousinakis (Greek: Περικλής Μπουσινάκης; born 23 April 1986) is a Greek professional footballer who plays as an attacking midfielder for Ilisiakos.

Bousinakis emerged from the football academy of Panathinaikos. He later played for Kerkyra in Beta Ethniki, and had also a loan spell at AB of Denmark.
