= Doxa Megalopoli =

Greek football club

A.O. Doxa Megalopoli Α.Ο. Δόξα Μεγαλόπολης A.O. Doxa Megalopolis
- Full name: Athlitikos Omilos Doxa Megalopoli
- Founded: 1956
- Ground: DAK Megalopolis Stadium, Megalopoli, Greece
- Capacity: 500
- Chairman: Nikitas Dimopoulos
- Manager: Ioannis Kadas
- League: Arcadia FCA Second Division
- 2025–26: Arcadia FCA First Division, 10th (relegated)
| Home colours | Away colours |

Doxa Megalopoli ("Glory") (Greek: Α.Ο. Δόξα Μεγαλόπολης A.O. Doxa Megalopoli) is a Greek football club in Megalopoli in Arcadia. The club was founded in 1956 and is one of the oldest clubs in the city. The team won 8 titles and 8 cups in the Arcadia FCA and played in the national Third and Fourth Divisions for several seasons. Their greatest success occurred in 2007 when they won the Greek Amateur Cup by beating Kilkisiakos 1–0 in Lamia. In 1978, they were that year's finalist in one of the minimum games in which they made it into the final of the Greek organization twice. The team participates in the Arcadia FCA Second Division in Greece. Their club colours are blue and white. They are based at the Megalopoli Public Athletic Center, with 500 seats and a turf field.

== Honours ==
- Greek Amateur Cup (1):
  - 2007, final:
    - Lamia National Stadium: Doxa Megalopoli 1–0 Kilkisiakos
- Finalist Greek Amateur Cup, 1978, final:
  - Tavros Field: Panaspropyrgiakos – Doxa Megalopoli: 1–0 (draw)
- Arcadia Championships (9):
  - 1977, 1979, 1981, 1983, 1986, 1993, 1995, 2006, 2016
- Arcadia Cup (8):
  - 1977–78: Doxa Megalopoli – Leonidi FC: 2–0
  - 1978–79: Doxa Megalopoli – Leonidi: 1–1 [2–1 (draw)]
  - 1980–81: Doxa Megalopoli – Leonidi: 2–0
  - 1993–94: Doxa Megalopoli – Asteras Tripolis: 1–0
  - 1995–96: Foca Megalopoli – Leonidi: 1–0
  - 2000–01: Doxa Megalopoli – Panthyreatikos: 1–1 [4–2 pen.]
  - 2005–06: Doxa Megalopoli – Leonidi: 4–3
  - 2006–07: Doxa Megalopoli – Panthyreatikos: 2–1
- Finalist Arcadia Cup (4):
  - 1984–85: Leonidi – Doxa Megalopoli: 1–1 [4–1 pen]
  - 2007–08: Leonidi – Doxa Megalopoli: 3–1
  - 2014–15: Panarcadicos – Doxa Megalopoli: 2–0
  - 2015–16: Panarcadicos – Doxa Megalopoli: 2–1

=== In national divisions ===
- Third Division:
  - 1977–78 (2nd Group): 15th place/20 matches, relegated, 31 pts. (31–48).
  - 1979–80 (2nd Group): 18th place/20th matches, relegated, 12 pts. (29–98).
  - 1981–82 (3rd Group): 11th place/15 matches, relegated, 17 pts. (31–41).
- Fourth Division:
  - 1983–84 (4th Group): 17th place/18 matches, relegated, 16 pts. (25–63).
  - 1986–87 (4th Group): 17th place/18 matches, relegated, 15 pts. (20–68).
  - 1993–94: relegated.
  - 1995–96 (3rd Group): 16th place/18 matches, relegated 17 pts. (17–81).
  - 2006–07 season (7th group): 5th place/16 matches, 50 pts. (37–23).
  - 2007–08 season (7th group): 15 matches, remained.
  - 2008–09 season (7th Group): 18th place/18 matches, relegated, 1 pt. (13–112).
