= Giannis Ikonomidis =

Greek footballer

Personal information
- Full name: Ioannis Ikonomidis
- Date of birth: 3 January 1998 (age 28)
- Place of birth: Greece
- Height: 1.81 m (5 ft 11 in)
- Position: Midfielder

Team information
- Current team: Marko
- Number: 88

Youth career
- 2012–2017: Panionios

Senior career*
Years	Team	Apps	(Gls)
2017–2020	Panionios	57	(1)
2020–2023	Atromitos	26	(0)
2021–2022	→ A.E. Kifisia (loan)	31	(3)
2023–2024	Ionikos	26	(5)
2024–2025	Terrassa	20	(0)
2025–	Marko	18	(2)

International career^{‡}
2016–2017	Greece U19	7	(0)
2019	Greece U21	3	(1)
- * Club domestic league appearances and goals as of 19:00, 15 February 2026 (UTC) ‡ National team caps and goals as of 25 April 2019

Giannis Ikonomidis (Greek: Γιάννης Οικονομίδης; born 3 January 1998) is a Greek professional footballer who plays as a midfielder for Super League 2 club Marko.
