= Corfu Football Clubs Association =

Association football governing body in Corfu Prefecture, Greece

- Full name: Corfu Football Clubs Association; Greek: Ένωση Ποδοσφαιρικών Σωματείων Κέρκυρας
- Short name: Corfu F.C.A.; Greek: Ε.Π.Σ. Κέρκυρας
- Founded: 1952; 74 years ago
- Headquarters: Corfu, Greece
- FIFA affiliation: Hellenic Football Federation
- President: Christos Hitiris
- Website: epskerkyras.gr

Corfu Football Clubs Association (Greek: Ένωση Ποδοσφαιρικών Σωματείων Κέρκυρας) are a governing body responsible for administering association football in Corfu Prefecture. They are based in the city of Corfu, and are a member of the Hellenic Football Federation.

== History ==
The Corfu Football Union (CFU) were founded in 1934.It was organisig a regional football league. It refounded on 17 August 1947. Their archives were destroyed by bombing during World War II. Founding members were Aris Kerkyra, Asteras Kerkyra, Ellispontos, Olympos Kerkyra, PAO Kerkyra, Pankerkyraikos. The Union renamed to Corfu Football Clubs Association in 1950. They were officially recognised by Hellenic Football Federation on 28 March 1952.

Clubs from Thesprotia was taking part on AFCA competitions until 1984.

== Organization ==
The association are a member of the Hellenic Football Federation and organize a regional football league and cup.

== List of champions ==
Season	Club
1952-53	Aris Kerkyra
1953-54	SFK Ellispontos
1954-55	Aris Kerkyra
1955-56	Asteras Kerkyra
1956-57	Aris Kerkyra
1957-58	
1958-59	
1959-60	Olympos Kerkyra
1960-61	
1961-62	
1962-63	
1963-64	Asteras Kerkyra
1964-65	Aris Kerkyra
1965-66	Olympos Kerkyra
1966-67	Olympiacos Mantouki
1967-68	Olympos Kerkyra
1968-69	
1969-70	Olympos Kerkyra
1970-71	Olympos Kerkyra
1971-72	Olympos Kerkyra
1972-73	Olympos Kerkyra
1973-74	Olympos Kerkyra
1974-75	Olympos Kerkyra
1975-76	AO Kerkyra
1976-77	AO Kerkyra
1977-78	Olympos Kerkyra
1978-79	Thesprotos
1979-80	Olympos Kerkyra
1980-81	Olympiacos Mantouki
1981-82	Thesprotos
1982-83	Olympos Kerkyra
1983-84	Kronos Argyrades
1984-85	PAO Korakiana
1985-86	AO Palefkimiakos
1986-87	Olympiacos Mantouki
1987-88	AO Palefkimiakos
1988-89	Olympiada Karousades
1989-90	Olympiacos Mantouki
1990-91	AO Palefkimmiakos
1991-92	Olympiada Karousades
1992-93	Olympiacos Mantouki
1993-94	AO Kassiopi
1994-95	OF Agios Matthaios
1995-96	AE Lefkimmi
1996-97	Olympos Kerkyra
1997-98	Thinaliakos Acharavi
1998-99	AE Lefkimmi
1999-00	OF Agios Matthaios
2000-01	AE Faiakes
2001-02	OF Agios Matthaios
2002-03	Olympos Kerkyra
2003-04	AE Faiakes
2004-05	Kronos Argyrades
2005-06	OF Agios Matthaios
2006-07	Volida Kato Garouna
2007-08	Olympos Kerkyra
2008-09	AE Lefkimmi
2009-10	Olympos Kerkyra
2010-11	AO Kassiopi
2011-12	Anagennisi Perivoli
2012-13	OF Agios Matthaios
2013-14	AO Sinarades
2014-15	AO Sinarades
2015-16	Asteras Petriti
2016-17	AE Lefkimmi
2017-18	Kronos Argyrades
2018-19	Thinaliakos Acharavi
2019-20	OF Agios Matthaios
2020-21	Abandoned
2021-22	Asteras Petriti
2022-23	Thinaliakos Acharavi
2023-24	Anagennisi Perivoli
2024-25	AE Lefkimmi
2025-26	OF Agios Matthaios

Corfu Football Clubs Association

== Cup ==
The Corfu FCA Cup is a football competition in which the clubs competing in any of the Corfu FCA Football Leagues participate.

=== List of Corfu FCA Cup Finals ===
Season	Club	Score	Club
1952-53	Asteras Kerkyra	2-2, 2-1 (return match)	SFK Ellispontos
1953-54			
1954-55			
1955-56			
1956-57			
1957-58			
1958-59			
1959-60			
1960-61			
1961-62	Olympos Kerkyra		
1962-63	Olympos Kerkyra		
1963-64			
1964-65	Olympos Kerkyra		
1965-66			
1966-67			
1967-68			
1968-69			
1969-70	Olympos Kerkyra		
1970-71	Olympos Kerkyra		
1971-72	Thesprotos		
1972-73	Olympos Kerkyra		
1973-74	Thesprotos		
1974-75	AO Lefkimmi	3-1	Keravnos Potamos
1975-76			
1976-77	AO Kerkyra	4-1	Kronos Argyrades
1977-78	Kronos Argyrades	2-0	AO Kerkyra
1978-79			
1979-80	Olympos Kerkyra	Interrupted	Kronos Argyrades
1980-81	Olympiacos Mantouki	4-3 pen (1-1 ft and et)	Olympos Kerkyra
1981-82	Olympos Kerkyra		Kronos Argyrades
1982-83	AO Kerkyra		
1983-84	AO Kerkyra	1-0	Olympos Kerkyra
1984-85	Olympos Kerkyra		
1985-86	AO Kassiopi	4-3 pen (0-0 ft and et)	Atromitos Strogιli
1986-87	AO Palefkimiakos		
1987-88	Kronos Argyrades	3-2 pen (0-0 ft and et)	Olympiada Karousades
1988-89	Olympos Kerkyra		
1989-90	Olympos Kerkyra		
1990-91	AO Kerkyra		
1991-92	AO Kerkyra		
1992-93	Olympos Kerkyra		
1993-94	AE Lefkimmi		
1994-95	AO Kerkyra		Kronos Argyrades
1995-96	Olympiada Karousades		
1996-97	OF Agios Matthaios		
1997-98	OF Agios Matthaios		
1998-99	AO Kerkyra	3-0	PAO Korakiana
1999-00	AO Kerkyra		
2000-01	AO Kerkyra		
2001-02	OF Agios Matthaios		
2002-03	Olympos Kerkyra		
2003-04	Enosi Panergatikos-Asteras	1-1 (4-1 pen)	Volida Kato Garouna
2004-05	AE Lefkimmi		
2005-06	Olympos Kerkyra		Kronos Argyrades
2006-07	Kronos Argyrades	2-0	Volida Kato Garouna
2007-08	Volida Kato Garouna	1-0	Kronos Argyrades
2008-09	Volida Kato Garouna	0-0 (3-0 et)	AE Lefkimmi
2009-10	Volida Kato Garouna	2-0	Anagennisi Perivoli
2010-11	Olympos Kerkyra	3-2	AO Kassiopi
2011-12	AO Kassiopi	3-2	AO Kerkyra
2012-13	Olympos Kerkyra	2-0	Odisseas Avliotes
2013-14	AO Sinarades	2-0	OF Agios Matthaios
2014-15	OF Agios Matthaios	2-1	Asteras Petriti
2015-16	Kronos Argyrades	2-0	Odisseas Avliotes
2016-17	AE Lefkimmi	1-0	Achilleas Nimfes
2017-18	OF Agios Matthaios	2-0	Volida Kato Garouna
2018-19	Thinaliakos Acharavi	3-0	Asteras Petriti
2021-22	Asteras Petriti	2-1	Thinaliakos Acharavi
2022-23	Asteras Petriti	4-2 pen (1-1 ft and et)	AE Lefkimmi
2023-24	AE Lefkimmi	3-0	OF Agios Matthaios

== Super Cup ==
The Corfu FCA Super Cup is a football one-match competition, which is contested annually by the Corfu A Division champion, and the winner of the Corfu FCA Cup.

Season	Clubs	Score
2006	OF Agios Matthaios-Olympos Kerkyra	4-1
2007	Kronos Argyrades-Volida Kato Garouna	3-2
2008	Volida Kato Garouna-Olympos Kerkyra	3-2
2009	Volida Kato Garouna-AE Lefkimmi	3-1
2010	Olympos Kerkyra-Volida Kato Garouna	1-0
2011	Olympos Kerkyra-AO Kassiopi	2-1
2012	Anagennisi Perivoli-AO Kerkyra (youths)	3-0
2013	OF Agios Matthaios-Olympos Kerkyra	0-3
2014	AO Sinarades-OF Agios Matthaios	1-1 (1-1 et 5-6 pen)
2015	Asteras Petriti-OF Agios Matthaios	Abandoned
2016	Asteras Petriti-Kronos Argyrades	1-3
2017	AE Lefkimmi-Achilleas Nimfes	7-0
2018	Kronos Argyrades-OF Agios Matthaios	3-1
2019	Thinaliakos Acharavi-Asteras Petriti	1-2
2022	Thinaliakos Acharavi-Asteras Petriti	0-4
2024	Asteras Petriti-Thinaliakos Acharavi	2-1

=== Performance by club ===
Club	Titles	Runner-up	Years (Titles)	Years (Runner-up)
Olympos Kerkyra	3	2	2010, 2011, 2013	2006, 2008
Asteras Petriti	3	2	2019, 2022, 2024	2016, 2019
Kronos Argyrades	3	-	2007, 2016, 2018	-
Volida Kato Garouna	2	2	2008, 2009	2007, 2010
OF Agios Matthaios	2	2	2006, 2014	2013, 2018
AE Lefkimmi	1	1	2017	2009
Anagennisi Perivoli	1	-	2012	-
Thinaliakos Acharavi	-	3	-	2019, 2022, 2024
AO Kassiopi	-	1	-	2011
AO Kerkyra (youths)	-	1	-	2012
AO Sinarades	-	1	-	2014
Achilleas Nimfes	-	1	-	2017

== Corfu FCA clubs in National divisions ==
Club	First Division (Since 1959-60)	Second Division (Since 1962-63)	Third Division (Since 1965-66)	Fourth Division (Since 1982-83)	2023-24
AO Kerkyra	5	12	14	11	Corfu FCA A Division
AOK Kerkyra	3	4	0	1	-
Olympos Kerkyra	0	0	5	20	Corfu FCA A Division
AE Lefkimmi	0	0	5	10	Gamma Ethniki
Asteras Petriti	0	0	3	0	Gamma Ethniki
Kerkyraikos AO	0	0	2	0	-
OF Agios Matthaios	0	0	1	6	Corfu FCA A Division
Kronos Argyrades	0	0	1	5	Corfu FCA A Division
Olympiacos Mantouki	0	0	1	4	-
AO Kassiopi	0	0	1	2	-
Thesprotos	0	0	1	1	-
Aris Filiates	0	0	1	0	-
Olympiada Karousades	0	0	0	3	Corfu FCA B Division
Volida Kato Garouna	0	0	0	3	Corfu FCA A Division
AE Faiakes	0	0	0	2	Corfu FCA A Division
Thinaliakos Acharavi	0	0	0	2	Corfu FCA A Division
PAO Korakiana	0	0	0	1	-
Asteras Kerkyra	0	0	0	1	-
Anagennisi Perivoli	0	0	0	1	Corfu FCA A Division
