= 2000–01 Gamma Ethniki =

Second Division
- Season: 2000–01
- Champions: Patraikos
- Promoted: Patraikos; Chalkidona-Near East
- Relegated: Acharnaikos; Naoussa; Kozani; Ampelokipi; Lamia; Veria; Anagennisi Karditsa; ILTEX Lykoi; Pierikos; Ialysos

The 2000–01 Gamma Ethniki was the 18th season since the official establishment of the third tier of Greek football in 1982 and under the name Second Division (Greek: Β΄ Κατηγορία). Patraikos was crowned champion, thus winning promotion to Beta Ethniki. Chalkidona-Near East also won promotion after a winning a promotion play-off in which was participated with Atromitos and Ethnikos Piraeus.

Acharnaikos, Naoussa, Kozani, Ampelokipi, Lamia, Veria, Anagennisi Karditsa, ILTEX Lykoi, Pierikos and Ialysos were relegated to Delta Ethniki.

== League table ==
Location of teams in 2000–01 Gamma Ethniki

Pos	Team	Pld	W	D	L	GF	GA	GD	Pts	Promotion or relegation
1	Patraikos (C, P)	34	26	5	3	78	26	+52	83	Promotion to Beta Ethniki
2	Chalkidona-Near East (P)	34	21	7	6	62	22	+40	70	Qualification for Promotion play-off
3	Atromitos	34	19	10	5	70	32	+38	67	Qualification for Promotion play-off
4	Ethnikos Piraeus	34	20	6	8	70	43	+27	66	Qualification for Promotion play-off
5	Leonidio	34	19	6	9	68	38	+30	63	
6	Marko	34	16	10	8	59	40	+19	58	
7	Kilkisiakos	34	16	7	11	57	46	+11	55	
8	Apollon Krya Vrysi (O)	34	16	6	12	56	54	+2	54	Qualification for relegation play-off
9	Acharnaikos (R)	34	15	5	14	54	50	+4	50	Qualification for relegation play-off
10	Naoussa (R)	34	13	8	13	38	46	−8	47	Relegation to Delta Ethniki
11	Kozani (R)	34	14	2	18	54	56	−2	44	Relegation to Delta Ethniki
12	Ampelokipi (R)	34	11	5	18	39	63	−24	38	Relegation to Delta Ethniki
13	Lamia (R)	34	9	10	15	33	44	−11	37	Relegation to Delta Ethniki
14	Veria (Note: Veria had 3 points deducted.) (R)	34	11	5	18	43	61	−18	35	Relegation to Delta Ethniki
15	Anagennisi Karditsa (R)	34	6	8	20	27	62	−35	26	Relegation to Delta Ethniki
16	ILTEX Lykoi (R)	34	6	6	22	29	55	−26	24	Relegation to Delta Ethniki
17	Pierikos (R)	34	4	9	21	30	62	−32	21	Relegation to Delta Ethniki
18	Ialysos (Note: Ialysos had 3 points deducted.) (R)	34	4	5	25	28	95	−67	14	Relegation to Delta Ethniki

(C) Champions; (O) Play-off winners; (P) Promoted; (R) Relegated

== Results ==
Home \ Away	ACH	AMP	KRD	AKV	ATR	CHA	ETH	IAL	LYK	KIL	KOZ	LAM	LEO	MAR	NAO	PAT	PIE	VER
Acharnaikos		4–2	3–1	2–2	1–0	0–1	1–0	5–1	4–1	1–1	1–0	4–3	2–0	0–0	0–0	2–0	3–1	2–0
Ampelokipi	2–1		4–0	1–2	2–2	0–0	1–0	2–1	1–0	0–1	0–2	0–0	4–1	2–2	2–0	0–1	4–2	1–2
Anagennisi Karditsa	2–1	2–1		2–0	1–1	0–3	0–1	1–2	1–1	0–0	1–0	1–1	1–1	1–2	0–1	1–3	1–1	2–0
Apollon Krya Vrysi	5–0	2–1	1–2		3–1	1–4	3–2	3–1	2–0	2–3	3–1	3–2	2–2	0–1	3–1	0–0	0–1	1–1
Atromitos	2–1	6–0	4–0	4–0		1–1	1–1	3–0	1–0	1–1	2–0	2–1	3–2	4–2	3–0	1–1	2–1	7–2
Chalkidona-Near East	2–1	3–0	2–0	3–1	0–1		1–0	1–1	3–0	3–0	6–0	2–0	0–1	1–0	2–2	0–1	3–0	0–0
Ethnikos Piraeus	1–0	3–0	4–0	2–1	4–4	0–0		2–0	4–0	2–0	3–2	1–1	1–1	2–1	4–1	0–1	3–0	5–2
Ialysos	0–1	2–2	2–2	0–1	2–5	0–4	0–1		2–1	1–4	2–1	1–1	0–2	1–2	0–0	0–1	1–0	0–1
ILTEX Lykoi	1–2	1–2	1–1	0–2	0–2	2–1	2–1	5–1		2–0	0–1	0–0	0–0	2–2	0–1	1–2	3–0	0–2
Kilkisiakos	2–1	4–0	2–0	0–1	0–2	0–2	2–2	4–2	3–1		2–4	3–0	2–1	3–2	2–0	0–1	2–1	5–0
Kozani	1–0	2–1	3–1	1–2	0–1	1–1	5–3	6–0	3–1	1–3		2–0	3–1	1–2	1–1	0–3	3–0	2–1
Lamia	3–1	1–0	1–0	3–4	0–0	0–1	1–2	1–0	2–1	1–1	1–0		0–0	1–0	0–1	1–1	3–2	2–0
Leonidio	3–0	3–0	5–1	5–1	1–0	2–3	1–3	8–1	1–0	2–1	3–1	3–0		0–6	3–0	1–0	3–0	5–1
Marko	3–3	1–0	3–0	2–1	0–0	2–3	4–1	2–0	2–0	0–1	2–1	2–1	0–0		2–1	1–1	2–0	4–1
Naoussa	1–0	0–1	2–1	1–1	1–0	2–1	1–3	6–0	2–0	1–0	3–4	1–0	0–2	2–2		1–3	1–0	1–1
Patraikos	4–2	7–1	2–0	4–0	4–2	3–1	3–4	8–1	3–0	2–2	1–0	2–1	2–1	4–1	2–0		3–0	1–0
Pierikos	2–3	1–2	2–1	1–1	0–0	0–2	2–3	5–2	1–1	1–1	2–1	0–0	0–1	2–2	2–2	0–2		0–0
Veria	3–1	3–0	2–0	0–2	0–2	0–2	1–2	4–1	1–2	6–2	3–1	3–1	0–3	0–0	1–2	1–2	1–0	

Legend: Blue = home team win; Yellow = draw; Red = away team win.

== Promotion play-offs ==
Team 1	Score	Team 2
Chalkidona-Near East	4–0	Ethnikos Piraeus
Atromitos	2–1	Ethnikos Piraeus
Chalkidona-Near East	4–1	Atromitos

Pos	Team	Pld	W	D	L	GF	GA	GD	Pts	Promotion
1	Chalkidona-Near East (P)	2	2	0	0	8	1	+7	6	Promotion to Beta Ethniki
2	Atromitos	2	1	0	1	3	5	−2	3	
3	Ethnikos Piraeus	2	0	0	2	1	6	−5	0	

(P) Promoted

== Relegation play-off ==
Team 1	Agg.	Team 2	1st leg	2nd leg	3rd leg
Apollon Krya Vrysi	5–5	Acharnaikos	3–1	1–1	1–3

== Top scorers ==
Rank	Player	Club	Goals
1	(Greece) Andreas Androutsos	Patraikos	35
2	(Greece) Stavros Lioftis	Apollon Krya Vrysi	28
3	(Greece) Dimitrios Moutas	Ethnikos Piraeus	21
3	(Greece) Michalis Klokidis	Leonidio	21
5	(Greece) Stavros Komiotis	Ethnikos Piraeus	17
5	(Slovakia) Rastislav Ján Lazorík	Marko	17
