= A.S. Rouvas =

Greek football club

- Full name: Αθλητικός Σύλλογος Ρούβας Γέργερης; Athlitikós Sýllogos Roúvas Gérgeris (Athletic Club Rouvas of Gergeri)
- Short name: Rouvas
- Founded: 3 December 1961; 64 years ago
- Ground: Gergeri Municipal Stadium
- Capacity: 600
- Chairman: Michalis Daskalakis
- Manager: Kostas Tavladorakis
- League: Heraklion FCA First Division
- 2025–26: Heraklion FCA First Division, 11th
- Website: rouvasfc.blogspot.gr
Home colours	Away colours

A.S. Rouvas Gergeri, short for Athlitikós Sýllogos Roúvas Gérgeris (Greek: Αθλητικός Σύλλογος Ρούβας Γέργερης, translated Athletic Club Rouvas of Gergeri), and more commonly known simply as Rouvas, is a Greek football club, based in Gergeri, Heraklion prefecture, Crete. The club was founded in December 1961. In 2011, they were promoted to the Gamma Ethniki, the third tier of the Greek football league system, for the first time in their history by finishing 1st in Group 10 of the 2010–11 Delta Ethniki. The club currently competes in the amateur Heraklion FCA First Division, and hosts its home games at the Gergeri Municipal Stadium, which has a seating capacity of 600 spectators.

== History ==
Club crest old color scheme.

The club was founded in 1961 as Athlitikos Omilos Rouvas, and mostly played friendly matches due to lack of a home ground. In 1968, the Greek military junta of 1967–1974 shut down the club as "inactive", as a result of it not being registered in any regional league of the Heraklion Football Clubs Association. The club remained inactive throughout 1974−1985, occasionally playing friendly matches only. In 1985, the club was re-established and participated for the first time in the Heraklion FCA Championship. The club has since been competing at regional level, with a short break during 1992−94.

During the 2008−09 season, Rouvas was crowned Heraklion FCA Champion and was promoted to the Delta Ethniki, the fourth tier of the Greek football league system for the first time in their history. Two years later, the club won the 2010–11 Delta Ethniki Group 10 championship, achieving promotion to the Gamma Ethniki. The same year, the club won the Heraklion FCA Cup for the first time in their history. As a result of their promotion, a professional football club was established as Rouvas F.C. − Nera Rouvas.

The club spent three seasons in the Gamma Ethniki, spanning from 2011 and until 2014, when they were relegated to the Heraklion FCA A1 Division, due to the Delta Ethniki being discontinued by the Hellenic Football Federation. Rouvas immediately won the division title, but failed to promote to the Gamma Ethniki finishing 2nd in the Greek FCA Winners' Championship. They were later expelled from to the Α1 Division and demoted to the Α2 Division due to financial issues.

== Titles & honours ==
=== Domestic ===
- Delta Ethniki (4th National Division)
  - Winners (1): 2010–11

=== Regional ===
- Heraklion FCA Championship
  - Winners (2): 2008−09, 2009−10
- Heraklion FCA Cup
  - Winners (1): 2010−11
