= PAS Lamia 1964 =

Association football club in Greece

Lamia
- Full name: Π.Α.Ε. Π.Α.Σ. Λαμία 1964 (PAS Lamia 1964 Football Club)
- Nickname: Kyanólefki (The Cyan-Whites)
- Founded: 1 June 1964; 62 years ago
- Ground: Lamia Municipal Stadium
- Capacity: 5,500
- Chairman: Christos Niklas
- Manager: Georgios Zacharopoulos
- League: Gamma Ethniki
- 2025–26: Gamma Ethniki (Group 3), 4th
- Website: lamia1964.gr
Home colours	Away colours

Crest of Lamia FC used until 2014

Lamia Football Club (Greek: Π.Α.Σ. Λαμία 1964) is a Greek professional football club based in Lamia, Greece. It was founded in 1964. The club plays in the Gamma Ethniki, the third tier of Greek football. It plays its home matches at the Lamia Municipal Stadium.

== History ==
=== Foundation and early years ===
On 1 June 1964, when the representatives of the clubs of Fthiotida decided to "carve out" a common course, A.S. Lamia was established. In order to reach the final decision, it took a long time and endless hours of negotiations. The "Queen of Fthiotida", as it is called, comes from the merger of Lamiakos and Palamiaki.

In 1961 Hellenic Football Federation decided that from the next season (1962–63) the 2nd National Division, at which Olympiacos Lamia would compete at that time, would consist of 60 teams divided into four groups and the champion from each group would also take the rally for the First National. As a result, at the end of the 1961–62 championship in a general assembly held by the members of Olympiacos Lamia (17 June 1962), they decided to propose to Palamiaki their merger and the creation of a new club and while initially the answer to the "yellow-black" was affirmative, their suggestion that the new group be called Palamiaky was not accepted and so "marriage ended in divorce".

The sinking of the negotiations with Palamiaki led to the new general assembly the members of Olympiacos (24 July 1962), where it was decided to merge the "redcurrants" with the Pamfthiotikos, named Lamiakos, who represented the prefecture in B National in the period 1963–64, but in the same year, the ticket for the category took and Palamiaiki as the champion of the National Team, with the result that Lamia was represented by two clubs in the category. This was also the time to create an association that would come from the union of the largest groups in the city.

On 25 May 1964, at the initiative of the then mayor of Lamia and the football players of the prefecture, a general meeting was held, which did not have the expected result, as it initially resulted in the creation of two new clubs of the AS. Lamia and the AS Thermopylae, however, a week later, on 1 June 1964, it was decided that the latter merged with AS. Ghoul.

=== Major paths ===
Although the "Cyan-Whites" had reached six times near the First National, they had not managed to rise to the first category (until 2017). Nevertheless, their course over the years, combined with appearances against the great forces of Greek football in the institution of the cup (2–1 and 1–0 with AEK and with Panathinaikos in the defeat of 1–5, but with the hosts leading to the 15th with Rizopoulos' head and accepting four goals after the first ten minutes of the extension), they have made PAS Lamia 1964 particularly popular in the prefecture of Fthiotida.

=== Recent years ===
PAS Lamia came close to rising in the 2nd National Championship after many years in 2006–07, but eventually finished fourth. During the 2007–08 season and while there were administrative changes, the international player of AEK and Olympiacos, Daniel Batista, was recruited as a coach, but again he did not manage to distinguish himself, winning 13th place with difficulty, ensuring the stay in category 3, bringing 40 points, just 7 over the relegation zone. The following year (2008–09) they were downgraded to D National Division.

In the summer of 2012, Lamia merged with Agrotis Leanokladi, who at that time were in D Ethniki, replacing them in the category, renamed PAS Lamia 1964. In the period 2012–13 they finished first in the 4th group in the regional championship, leaving A.O. Karditsa 5 points behind. At the same time they also won the Cup of Fthiotida, defeating Achilles Domokos with 3–1 in the final.

The following year (2013–14) they finished first in their group at the Gamma Ethniki, ensuring the rise for the second division (Football League) in 2014–15. During the 2014–15 season they competed in the 2nd League of the Football League, where they gained the fourth position. The following year (2015–16) they were ranked fifth in the same championship.

=== Promotion to the Super League ===
In the 2016–17 season, PAS Lamia won the promotion to the Super League (2017–18) for the first time in their history in Greek football. During Lamia's debut presence in the top division during the 2017–18 season, the club recorded 6 wins, 12 draws, 12 losses, and accumulated 30 points, successfully securing its stay in the top flight. Additionally, after eliminating Panathinaikos in the third round, they reached the quarter-finals of the Greek Football Cup. In the 2018–19 season, the team showed notable improvement, achieving an even better performance by finishing 7th in the league, the highest position among all regional teams outside Athens and Thessaloniki. Furthermore, Lamia recorded an impressive run in the 2018–19 Greek Football Cup, reaching the semi-finals for the second time in its history after eliminating both Panathinaikos and Olympiacos in knockout rounds.

Over the next two seasons, the club entered the league as one of the main relegation candidates, but defied the predictions by finishing 10th in both the 2019–20 and 2020–21 seasons. In the 2021–22 season, they reached the semi-finals of the Greek Football Cup for the third time in their history, eliminating Ilioupoli, Ionikos, and Aris in knockout rounds. The qualification against Aris was particularly dramatic, requiring a penalty save by goalkeeper Bojan Šaranov in stoppage time of extra time to preserve a 1–0 victory and secure a spot in the last four.

During the 2023–24 season, the team qualified for the championship play-offs of the Greek Super League alongside the powerhouses of Greek football, securing a single point in the phase through a 1–1 draw against PAOK.

This successful run did not continue into the 2024–25 season, as Lamia finished in last place, resulting in relegation to Super League Greece 2 after eight years. A notable highlight during a tragic season was Lamia's 3–1 victory over Panathinaikos on 23 February 2025 for the 24th matchday, ending a winless streak that had lasted since the second matchday of the championship. Following the relegation, due to financial difficulties and the departure of Panourgias Papaioannou from the club's administration, the decision was made for the team to compete in the Gamma Ethniki instead.

During the 2025–26 season, the club competed in Group 3 of the Gamma Ethniki, finishing in 2nd place and missing out on the promotion play-offs by just two points. A high number of draws (14 in 27 matches) ultimately cost the team, resulting in them remaining in the Gamma Ethniki.

== Crest and colours ==
=== Crest ===
Historically the emblem of AS Lamia is the letter "L" in blue or white color as it was decided at the founding of the club on 1 June 1964. This was the emblem until the period 1978–79. At that time the coat of arms with vertical blue and white stripes was used as an emblem. The coat of arms or letter "L" in turn was the emblem of the club until the period 1994–95. In the race season 1995–96, the white and blue stripes were used for the first time and the letter "L" was included in the coat of arms. In the period 1999–00, when Lamia fought in the Delta Ethniki used the Rainbow Coat as an emblem. That year the team won the championship. In 2008, during Lamias' stay in Pelion for pre-season preparation, used as a coat of arms in a training suit a coat of arms between laurels with Latin characters LFC and 1964, which is the year of founding the club.

The emblem that uses the club today was presented in 2014 and depicts Athanasios Diakos, the hero of Roumeli, in his upper right hand side.

=== Colours ===
The colours of the club are cyan and white.

== Stadium ==
Lamia Municipal Stadium is a stadium located in the city of Lamia, in the Prefecture of Fthiotida in Central Greece. It is the headquarters of PAS Lamia since the founding of a club. It was built in 1952 and belongs to the Municipality of Lamia. The stadium is located in the northern part of Lamia, next to the local Town Hall and is part of Lamia Municipal Sports Center (DAK of Lamia). Its capacity is 5,500 seats, making it the twelfth largest stadium in the Football League for the 2014–15 season. The stadium was rebuilt in 2004 and 2008, and blue plastic seats were added to all the stands. The record of attendance at the Lamia Municipal Stadium took place on 31 March 1968, in a match between Lamia and Trikala, with 11,502 fans staying at the stadium stage. In the summer of 2017 the stadium was renovated to license PAS Lamia in the Super League. So, five new headlamps were added for better illumination of the pitch and also new seats. In addition, the main stadium of the stadium was built, the changing rooms, benches and much more were renovated.

== Honours and achievements ==
=== Domestic competitions ===
Leagues:

- Gamma Ethniki
  - Winners (2): 1972–73, 2013–14
- Delta Ethniki
  - Winners (5): 1989–90, 1993–94, 1999–00, 2003–04, 2012–13

Cups:

- Greek Cup
  - Semi-finals (3): 2018–19, 2021–22, 2022–23

=== Regional competitions ===
Leagues:

- Phthiotis FCA Championship
  - Winners (1): 1972–73

Cups:

- Phthiotis FCA Cup
  - Winners (9): 1972–73, 1981–82, 1988–89, 1989–90, 1993–94, 1998–99, 1999–00, 2002–03, 2012–13

== Seasons in the 21st century ==
Season	Category	Position	Cup
2000–01	Gamma Ethniki	13th	GS
2001–02	Delta Ethniki	8th	
2002–03	Delta Ethniki	5th	-
2003–04	Delta Ethniki	1st	-
2004–05	Gamma Ethniki	6th	1R
2005–06	Gamma Ethniki	13th	2R
2006–07	Gamma Ethniki	4th	1R
2007–08	Gamma Ethniki	13th	1R
2008–09	Gamma Ethniki	14th	4R
2009–10	Delta Ethniki	7th	-
2010–11	Delta Ethniki	14th	-
2011–12	Local Phthiotis Championship	2nd	-
2012–13	Delta Ethniki	1st	-
2013–14	Gamma Ethniki	1st	R16
2014–15	Super League 2	4th	1R
2015–16	Super League 2	5th	GS
2016–17	Super League 2	2nd	R16
2017–18	Super League	13th	QF
2018–19	Super League	7th	SF
2019–20	Super League	10th	QF
2020–21	Super League	10th	QF
2021–22	Super League	13th	SF
2022–23	Super League	12th	SF
2023–24	Super League	**6th**	5R
2024–25	Super League	14th	4R
2025–26	Gamma Ethniki	4th	

Best position in bold.

Key: 3R = Third Round, 4R = Fourth Round, 5R = Fifth Round, GS = Group Stage, QF = Quarter-finals, SF = Semi-finals.
