= P.A.N.O. Malia F.C. =

PANOM
- Full name: Ποδοσφαιρικός Αθλητικός Ναυτικός Όμιλος Μαλίων; Podosferikós Athlitikós Naftikós Ómilos Malíon (Football Athletic Nautical Club of Malia)
- Short name: PANOM
- Founded: 1970; 56 years ago
- Ground: Malia Municipal Ground
- Manager: Vasilios Plousis
- League: Heraklion FCA First Division
- 2025−26: Heraklion FCA First Division, 6th
Home colours	Away colours

P.A.N.O. Malia F.C., also known as PANOM, short for Podosferikós Athlitikós Naftikós Ómilos Malíon (Greek: Ποδοσφαιρικός Αθλητικός Ναυτικός Όμιλος Μαλίων) is a Greek amateur football club, based in Malia, Heraklion, on the island of Crete, Greece. They currently play in the local Heraklion FCA A1 Division and host their home games at the local Malia Stadium. They've enjoyed relative success in the early 2000s, having won the Greek Football Amateur Cup in 2000 under coach Giannis Petrakis. They have previously played once in the Gamma Ethniki, the third tier of the Greek football league system during the 2004−05 season, and have also played several seasons in the country's now defunct 4th National Division.

== History ==
PANOM was established in 1970 as a formal continuation of Pythagoras Malia, an unregistered amateur football club of the area. They occasionally played in the Delta Ethniki, the (now defunct) fourth tier of the Greek football league system between 1996–2004, when they gained promotion to the Gamma Ethniki for the first time in club history. They failed to avoid relegation during the 2004–05 season as newcomers and returned to the Delta Ethniki once more.

In 2000, PANOM won both the Heraklion FCA Cup for the first time in their history, as well as the more prestigious Greek Football Amateur Cup defeating Orfeas Souroti in the competition Final held at Nea Smyrni Stadium. They would go on to win the FCA Cup twice more, in 2007 and 2018.

== Honours ==
=== Domestic ===
- Greek Football Amateur Cup
  - Winners (1): 1999−00

=== Regional ===
- Heraklion FCA Championship
  - Winners (2): 1995−96, 1997−98
- Heraklion FCA Cup
  - Winners (3): 1999−00, 2006−07, 2017−18
- Heraklion FCA Super Cup
  - Winners (1): 2018
