= Marko 1927 F.C. =

Greek football club

GS Marko Γ.Σ. Μαρκό
- Full name: Π.Α.Ε. Γυμναστικός Σύλλογος Μαρκοπούλου «Μαρκό» PAE Gymnastikos Syllogos Marko Markopoulou
- Nickname: Marko
- Founded: 1927; 99 years ago
- Ground: Municipal Stadium of Markopoulo
- Capacity: 3000
- Chairman: Antonis Pikoulas
- Manager: Soulis Papadopoulos
- League: Super League Greece 2
- 2025–26: Super League Greece 2 (South Group), 3rd
- Website: markofc.gr www.facebook.com/MarkoFC1927
Home colours	Away colours

The non celebratory logo of Marko FC

Gymnastikos Syllogos Marko Markopoulou (Greek: Π.Α.Ε. Γυμναστικός Σύλλογος Μαρκοπούλου «Μαρκό», romanized: PAE Gymnastikos Sillogos Markopoulou "Marko", lit. 'Gymnastic Club of Markopoulo "Marko"') is a Greek football club based in Markopoulo Mesogeas. Its official founding year is 1927. Its official colors are green and white. Its emblem is a vine leaf. It uses the Municipal Stadium of Markopoulo Mesogeas as its home ground.

The club currently maintains a football department, while it previously had departments in athletics, basketball, volleyball, cycling (founded in 2016), and table tennis.

The football team belongs to the East Attica Football Clubs Association and has competed for many years in the Fourth National Division and the Third National Division, while in recent years it has participated in the local championship of the FCA East Attica.

== History ==
GS Marko was founded in 1927 and was officially recognized by the Athens Court of First Instance in 1930 by decision number 7839. In 1961, it was officially recognized by the HFF with Registry Number 932 and joined the FCA Athens, beginning its official competitive activities in the 1961–1962 season.

In 1969, the club reached the top division of the FCA Athens for the first time, competing from the 1969–1970 season until the 1972–1973 season. In 1978, it returned to the top division of the FCA Athens and established itself there from the 1978–1979 season onward.

In 1984, it was crowned super champion of the FCA Athens and was promoted to the National Amateur Division, where it competed during the 1984–1985, 1985–1986, and 1986–1987 seasons. In 1994, it was crowned champion of the FCA Athens again and was promoted to the national leagues, establishing itself in the Delta Ethniki and Gamma Ethniki divisions for over 15 years until 2010.

In 1995, the club immediately won the Delta Ethniki championship and was promoted to the Gamma Ethniki, where it competed from the 1995–1996 season until the 2004–2005 season. It then played in the Delta Ethniki from 2005–2006 until 2009–2010, after which it was relegated to the local championships of the East Attica Football Clubs Association after 16 years in the national championships.

In 2019, it won the FCA East Attica championship and returned to the national leagues.

In 1984, the club was a finalist in the FCA Athens Cup, and in 1994 it won the Cup by defeating A.O. Agios Ierotheos of Peristeri in the final. It was also a finalist in the FCA East Attica Cup in 2006, 2007, and 2018.

In the 2019–2020 season, it finished 2nd in Group 6 of the Gamma Ethniki (now the 4th division). In the 2020–2021 season, it finished 9th in Group 6 and was relegated to the local championships. In the 2021–2022 season, it won the A' Category championship of the FCA East Attica and finished 3rd in the Champions of FCAs Championship 2022, securing promotion back to the Gamma Ethniki.

In the 2024-25 season, Marko has achieved the first place in the 4th Group of Gamma Ethniki and for the first time in its history, it was promoted to the professional Super League Greece 2 championship after beating Ilisiakos 2-1 in the penultimate match of the season, finishing the season with a total of 22 wins, 8 draws and 2 losses in 32 matches, becoming the third club from the region of Mesogeia to participate in the Second Division since AO Koropi which participated in the Beta Ethniki from 1969–70 to 1976–77 seasons and Aittitos Spata in 2018-19.

In the 2025-26 season, Marko participated in the Superleague 2 South Group, under the guidance of coach Soulis Papadopoulos, who is seasoned in the Second highest Category of Greek football with 384 matches in his career, has managed to achieve the 3rd place in the group in their first year participating in the league, finishing behind Kalamata and Panionios, scoring 9 victories, 4 draws and 5 defeats in the main season and 2 victories, 3 draws and 1 defeat in the Promotion Playoffs.

== Players ==
=== Current squad ===
As of 20 October 2026

Note: Flags indicate national team as defined under FIFA eligibility rules; some limited exceptions apply. Players may hold more than one non-FIFA nationality.

No.	Pos.	Nation	Player
1	GK	GRE	Christos Theodorakis
2	DF	GRE	Iason Skarlatidis
3	DF	GRE	Pavlos Smalis
4	DF	GRE	Alkis Markopouliotis
5	DF	GRE	Dimitrios Stamou
6	MF	GRE	Leonardos Kopanidis (on loan from Atromitos)
7	MF	ARG	Iván Federico Müller
8	MF	SWE	Edvin Bećirović
9	FW	MAR	Youssef El-Arabi
10	MF	GRE	Charalampos Pavlidis (captain)
11	FW	ARG	Lucas Necul
12	GK	GRE	Stamatis Kantarakis
13	DF	GRE	Stelios Ritsotakis
14	DF	GRE	Nikolaos Nikoletopoulos
15	DF	ESP	Pepe Castaño
16	FW	SWE	Alexander Johansson
17	FW	GRE	Vangelis Alexopoulos
19	DF	GRE	Pavlos Kyriakidis

No.	Pos.	Nation	Player
21	MF	GRE	Nikos Konstantakopoulos
22	MF	ARG	Mariano Gerez (on loan from Lanús)
23	FW	SRB	Nemanja Milojević
26	MF	GRE	Konstantinos Tsaknis
28	FW	GRE	Andreas Panagiotakopoulos
30	DF	ALB	Gertjan Bushaj
33	MF	ARG	Javier Mendoza
37	DF	ARG	Faustino Dettler
47	MF	GRE	Ilias Petratos
64	MF	ALB	Fatjon Andoni
68	GK	GRE	Panagiotis Avgerinos
73	FW	GRE	Alexandros Voilis
74	GK	GRE	Alexandros Exarchos
88	MF	GRE	Giannis Ikonomidis
91	FW	GRE	Konstantinos Nikolopoulos
92	MF	BRA	Sebá
99	FW	GRE	Athanasios Zapatinas

== Technical staff ==
Office	Nationality	Staff	Source
Head coach	(Greece)	Soulis Papadopoulos	
Assistant coach	(Greece)	Nikos Orfanidis	
Team Manager	(Greece)	Panagiotis Tsalas	
Goalkeeper coach	(Poland)	Józef Wandzik	
Fitness coach	(Greece)	Dimitris Gonidellis	

== Honours ==
=== Domestic ===
  - Gamma Ethniki Group 4: 1
    - 2024–25
  - Delta Ethniki Champions: 1
    - 1994–95
  - Athens FCA Champions: 1
    - 1983–84
  - Athens FCA Cup Winners: 1
    - 1994–95
  - East Attica FCA Champions: 2
    - 2018–19, 2021–22

== Season by season ==
League participation since 1984'

- 1984–85: Amateur National Division: Group 2: 7th
- 1985–86: Amateur National Division: Group 2: 11th
- 1986–87: Amateur National Division: Group 2: 10th (Relegated)
- 1987–88: Athens FCA Championship
- 1988–89: Athens FCA Championship
- 1989–90: Athens FCA Championship
- 1990–91: Athens FCA Championship
- 1991–92: Athens FCA Championship
- 1992–93: Athens FCA Championship
- 1993–94: Athens FCA Championship: Group 2: 1st (Promoted)
- 1994–95: Delta Ethniki: Group 2: 1st (promoted)
- 1995–96: Gamma Ethniki: Southern group: 8th
- 1996–97: Gamma Ethniki: Southern group: 8th
- 1997–98: Gamma Ethniki: Southern group: 3rd
- 1998–99: Gamma Ethniki: Southern group: 4th
- 1999–00: Gamma Ethniki: 4th
- 2000–01: Gamma Ethniki: 6th
- 2001–02: Gamma Ethniki: 4th
- 2002–03: Gamma Ethniki: 10th
- 2003–04: Gamma Ethniki: 12th
- 2004–05: Gamma Ethniki: 17th (Relegated)
- 2005–06: Delta Ethniki: Group 9, 3rd
- 2006–07: Delta Ethniki: Group 9, 3rd
- 2007–08: Delta Ethniki: Group 9: 6th
- 2008–09: Delta Ethniki: Group 9: 7th
- 2009–10: Delta Ethniki: Group 9: 15th (Relegated)
- 2010–11: East Attica FCA Championship: Division one: 12th
- 2011–12: East Attica FCA Championship: Division one: 2nd
- 2012–13: East Attica FCA Championship Division one
- 2013–14: East Attica FCA Championship Division one
- 2014–15: East Attica FCA Championship: Division one: 12th
- 2015–16: East Attica FCA Championship: Division one: 8th
- 2016–17: East Attica FCA Championship: Division one: 14th
- 2017–18: East Attica FCA Championship: Division one: 3rd
- 2018–19: East Attica FCA Championship: Division one: 1st (Promoted)
- 2019–20: Gamma Ethniki: Group 6: 2nd
- 2020–21: Gamma Ethniki: Group 6: 10th (Relegated)
- 2021–22: East Attica FCA Championship: Division one: 1st (Promoted)
- 2022–23: Gamma Ethniki: Group 5: 2nd
- 2023–24: Gamma Ethniki: Group 3: 6th
- 2024–25: Gamma Ethniki: Group 4: 1st (Promoted)
- 2025–26: Super League Greece 2: Southern Group: 3rd
