= A.O. Kerkyra =

Association football club in Greece

AO Kerkyra
- Full name: Athlitikos Omilos Kerkyra (Athletic Club Kerkyra)
- Nickname: Φαίακες (Phaiakes)
- Founded: 1968; 58 years ago
- Ground: Kerkyra Stadium
- Capacity: 2,685
- Chairman: Georgios Kolytas
- Manager: Charalambos Arvanitakis
- League: Corfu FCA
- 2025–26: Corfu FCA Second Division, 4th
- Website: https://aokerkyra.com/
Home colours	Away colours

Athlitikos Omilos Kerkyra (Greek: Αθλητικός Όμιλος Κέρκυρα; lit. 'Athletic Club Kerkyra') is a Greek football club based on the island of Corfu (Kerkyra), Greece.

== History ==
It was formed in 1967 as "Kerkyraikos F.C." following a merge of three Corfu clubs ("Aris Kerkyras" est 1924, "Helespontos" est 1923 and "Asteras Kerkyras" est 1926). These three teams alongside "Olympos Kerkyras" were dominating Corfu Local Championship before the creation of Greek National Leagues in 1967. In order to represent Corfu in the National B' Class League the three teams decided to merge in 1967. Due to some players' dispute with "Olympos Kerkiras" in 1968 the team had to change its name to "A.O. Kerkyra".

=== Golden age ===
After 36 years in lower divisions A.O. Kerkyra managed to reach top-level Alpha Ethniki in 2004. The long effort to success was inspired by chairman Spyros Kalogiannis who took control in 1999 and managed to climb three divisions in 4 years. Though the long-awaited "Alpha Ethniki" didn't end up as expected as the club was relegated, taking the last place in the final table. After a successful year in B' Ethniki, 2005–06 season ended with Kerkyra celebrating another chance in Alpha Ethniki. 2006-2007 was another failure in Alpha Ethniki or Super League Greece, with Kerkyra fighting bravely against relegation, but ending up relegated after a 2–2 tie on the last match against Panathinaikos. In the 2009–2010 season in Beta Ethniki they secured promotion to the super league on 2 May 2010 with a 0–0 draw against Panetolikos. The next years were the best for the Corfiot team managing to remain at Alpha Ethniki for three consecutive years.

=== Seven years of inactivity ===
In the 2012–13 season A.O. Kerkyra were relegated (16th place) to Beta Ethniki.

At the same time another team from the island of Corfu, A.O. Kassiopi was promoted from third tier to Beta Ethniki and proposals for a merger were made. As part of the merger, amidst protests from fans and veteran players, it was decided that A.O. Kerkyra would cease to exist, and that A.O. Kassiopi would be renamed to "Kerkyra". Efforts to revive the club even at Amateur level were unsuccessful, and the club's administration was controlled by the shareholders of A.O. Kassiopi.

=== Return to local championships ===
After 7 years of inactivity of the club, on March 12, 2020, with the 393/2020 decision of the Corfu Magistrates' Court, the club acquired a temporary board of directors. The goal of this effort is for the club to enter the championships of the next season. Since the 2020-2021 season, it has been competing in the A' division of the Corfu Football Association.

=== Recent History ===
In the 2024-25 season, A.O. Kerkyra announced that it will not participate in the local championships due to excessive debts and will only operate a football academy under AFC Ajax collaboration. In June 2025 the end of the collaboration was announced.

As of November 2025, A.O. Kerkyra participates the Second Division of the Corfu Football Clubs association amateur championship

== Colors, emblem and ground ==
The club's colors are Maroon and Blue, depicting the colors of the island and its emblem is the ancient Corfiot's ("Faiakes") trireme, which is the island's emblem. The National stadium of the town of Corfu, "E.A.K.K.", (built in 1955) hosts A.O. Kerkyra since its foundation.

== Fans ==
Their nickname is Vourligans, a portmanteau of Vourlismenos (crazy in corfiot dialect) and Hooligans.

== Rivalries ==
A.O. Kerkyra's longest rivalry is with local club Olympos Kerkyra, though due to A.O. Kerkyra's high division presence, the two teams don't play often against each other. Kerkyra also have long rivalries with nearby Epirus clubs as PAS Giannina, Anagennisi Arta, Panetolikos and Tilikratis of Lefkada. The reason for the rivalry is that historically these clubs competed against each other in order to advance to higher leagues. PAS Giannina and Anagennisi Arta, especially, are from nearby Epirus and there is a historical and cultural, (usually friendly), rivalry between the islanders and their mainland neighbours that also extends to their respective football clubs and fans. Panetolikos are another mainland team from nearby Aetolia-Acarnania and the same rivalry logic applies as with the Epirus teams.

== Stadium ==
- Built in 1961
- Capacity of 2,685 (all seated)
- Biggest Attendance 5,000 (AO Kerkyra v PAS Giannina 1974)

The stadium has two stands, the main one has a roof and is where the players and officials emerge from. The second stand is situated directly opposite and is a notable and highly hostile atmosphere during big games. This is also where a lot of the Vourligans will watch from. This stand was constructed in 1973.

== Honours ==
- Second Division: (1)

2003–04

- Third Division: (1)

2001–02

- Fourth Division: (3)

1991–92, 1995–96, 2000–01

- Corfu FCA First Division: (2)

1975–76, 1976–77

- Corfu FCA Cup: (9)

1976–77, 1982–83, 1983–84, 1990–91, 1991–92, 1994–95, 1998–99, 1999–00, 2000–01

== Managers ==
- (Greece) Nikos Pantelis (1996)
- (Greece) Babis Tennes (2003)
- (Greece) Nikos Anastopoulos (July 1, 2003 – Jan 11, 2005)
- (Greece) Giorgos Foiros (Jan 25, 2005 – April 21, 2005)
- (Greece) Babis Tennes (July 1, 2005 – Feb 12, 2008)
- (Greece) Nikos Pantelis (Dec 1, 2008 – May 31, 2009)
- (Greece) Babis Tennes (July 27, 2009 – Nov 30, 2010)
- (Montenegro) Božidar Bandović (Nov 30, 2010 – Nov 9, 2011)
- (Spain) Javi Gracia (Nov 14, 2011 – March 28, 2012)
- (Greece) Timos Kavakas (March 28, 2012 – June 30, 2012)
- (Greece) Apostolos Mantzios (July 1, 2012 – Feb 6, 2013)
- (Greece) Giannis Papakostas (Feb 7, 2013 – April 29, 2013)
- (Greece) Giannis Xondrogiannis (April 2020–)

== Historic presidents ==
- Dimosthenis Tsagaratos (1970)
- Spiros Kalogiannis (2000–10)

== AO Kerkyra season performances 1969 – present ==
- 1969–70: B' National A Group (11th)
- 1970–71: B' National A Group (17th)
- 1971–72: B' National A Group (14th)
- 1972–73: B' National A Group (16th
- 1973–74: B' National A Group (14th)
- 1974–75: B' National A Group (20th; Relegation)
- 1975–76: After the fall of the Second national, AOK is in the First Division of the Football Association of Corfu
- 1976–77: A' Division of F.A. Corfu
- 1977–84: A' Division of F.A. Corfu
- 1984–85: C' National South Group (14th)
- 1985–86: C' National South Group (11th)
- 1986–87: C' National South Group (12th)
- 1987–88: C' National South Group (12th; Relegation)
- 1988–89: D' National (4th; Promotion)
- 1989–90: C' National South Group (16th; Relegation)
- 1990–91: D' National (3rd)
- 1991–92: D' National (1st; Promotion) - Finalist in Greek Amateur Cup
- 1992–93: C' National South Group (14th; Relegation)
- 1993–94: D' National (7th)
- 1994–95: D' National (3rd)
- 1995–96: D' National (1st; Promotion)
- 1996–97: C' National South Group (9th)
- 1997–98: C' National South Group (12th; Relegation)
- 1998–99: D' National (5th)
- 1999–00: D' National (3rd)
- 2000–01: D' National (1st; Promotion)
- 2001–02: C' National (1st; Promotion)
- 2002–03: B' National (5th)
- 2003–04: B' National (1st; Historical Promotion to A' National)
- 2004–05: A' National (16th; Relegation)
- 2005–06: B' National (2nd; Promotion)
- 2006–07: Super League (14th; Relegation)
- 2007–08: B' National (7th)
- 2008–09: B' National (5th)
- 2009–10: B' National (2nd; Promotion)
- 2010–11: Super League (12th)
- 2011–12: Super League (13th)
- 2012–13: Super League (16th; Relegation)
- 2020–21: Corfu FCA Second Division (The season was abandoned after 3rd round)
- 2021–22: Corfu FCA Second Division (2nd)
- 2022–23: Corfu FCA First Division (7th)
- 2023–24: Corfu FCA First Division (4th)
- 2024–25: Club was inactive
- 2025–26: Corfu FCA Second Division (4th; Promotion)
- 2026–27: Club was inactive

Note: A' National = Super League, B' National = Football League, C' National = Gamma Ethniki
