= Dimitrios Roussis =

Greek footballer

Personal information
- Full name: Dimitrios Roussis
- Date of birth: 6 May 1988 (age 38)
- Place of birth: Agrinio, Greece
- Height: 1.90 m (6 ft 3 in)
- Position: Centre back

Team information
- Current team: Episkopi

Youth career
- Panetolikos

Senior career*
Years	Team	Apps	(Gls)
2007–2011	Panetolikos	14	(0)
2009	→ Preveza (loan)	9	(0)
2011–2012	Tilikratis	21	(2)
2012–2013	Asteras Tripolis	3	(0)
2013–2014	AEL	25	(5)
2014–2016	Kalamata	50	(0)
2016–2017	Tsiklitiras Pylos	26	(2)
2017–2018	Ethnikos Piraeus	0	(0)
2018–	Episkopi	0	(0)
- * Club domestic league appearances and goals

Dimitrios Roussis (Greek: Δημήτριος Ρούσσης; born 6 May 1988) is a Greek professional football defender.

== Career ==
Born in Agrinio, Roussis began playing football with his hometown club, Panetolikos in Gamma Ethniki. Nowadays, he's studying sport and management "de filsdeup" at the university of Neuchâtel (Switzerland).
