= Kronos Argyrades F.C. =

Greek football club

Kronos Argyrades
- Full name: A.P.S. Kronos Argyrades
- Founded: 1968; 58 years ago
- Ground: Kerkyra FCA Stadium
- Capacity: 2,236
- Manager: Kostas Kaloudis
- League: Corfu FCA First Division
- 2025–26: Corfu FCA First Division, 4th

Kronos Argyrades Football Club is a Greek football club, based in Argyrades, Corfu, Greece.

== Honours ==
=== Domestic Titles and honours ===
  - Gamma Ethniki Champion: 1
    - 2018–19
  - Kerkyra FCA Champion: 3
    - 1983–84, 2004–05, 2017–18
  - Kerkyra FCA Cup Winners: 4
    - 1977–78, 1987–88, 2006–07, 2015–16
  - Kerkyra FCA Super Cup Winners: 3
    - 2007, 2016, 2018
  - Kerkyra FCA Second Division Champion: 3
    - 1972–73, 1977–78, 2012–13
  - Kerkyra FCA Third Division Champion: 1
    - 1976–77
