= O.F. Agios Matthaios F.C. =

Association football club in Greece

O.F.A.M.
- Full name: Omilos Filathlon Agios Matthaios F.C.
- Founded: 1972; 54 years ago
- Ground: Ágios Matthaíos Municipal Stadium
- Capacity: 400
- Chairman: Spyridon Kouris
- Manager: Ioannis Chontrogiannis
- League: Gamma Ethniki
- 2025–26: Corfu FCA First Division, 1st (promoted)
Home colours	Away colours

Omilos Filathlon Agios Matthaios Football Club (Greek: Όμιλος Φιλάθλων Αγίου Ματθαίου) is a Greek football club based in Ágios Matthaíos, Corfu, Greece.

== History ==
Omilos Filathlon Agios Matthaios (OFAM) was founded in 1972. The club was officially recognized by the HFF with Registration Number (AM) 1905 and joined the Corfu FCA, beginning its official competitive action. Initially starting from the lower divisions of the Corfu FCA, following its promotion to the top tier, the club was never relegated from it again.

During the 1994–95 season, OFAM won the Corfu FCA championship and celebrated promotion to the Delta Ethniki for the first time in its history. The club competed in the fourth tier starting in the 1995–96 season and remained there until the 1997–98 season. In the 1999–2000 season, the team captured the Corfu FCA title once again and qualified for the 2000 Greek Football Clubs Association Winners' Championship, where it ultimately missed out on earning promotion back to the Delta Ethniki.

In the 2001–02 season, the club captured the Corfu FCA championship once again, earning promotion back to the Delta Ethniki. However, its stay was brief, as OFAM was relegated following the 2002–03 season. In the 2005–06 season, OFAM was crowned Corfu FCA champions once more and returned to the fourth tier for the 2006–07 season, which again ended in relegation.

In the 2012–13 season, OFAM was crowned Corfu FCA champions once again and qualified for the 2013 Greek Football Clubs Association Winners' Championship, missing out on a return to the national divisions. In the 2019–20 season, OFAM won the Corfu FCA championship, earning promotion to the Gamma Ethniki and returning to the national levels.

During the 2020–21 season, which was shortened to a single round instead of two, OFAM finished 5th and maintained its spot in the division. In the 2021–22 season, the team finished 9th and was relegated back to the local regional league.

In the 2025–26 season, OFAM captured the Corfu FCA championship for the seventh time in its history, securing its return to the Gamma Ethniki after a four-year absence.

== Honours ==
=== Domestic ===
  - Corfu FCA Champions: 7
    - 1994–95, 1999–00, 2001–02, 2005–06, 2012–13, 2019–20, 2025–26
  - Corfu FCA Cup Winners: 5
    - 1996–97, 1997–98, 2001–02, 2014–15, 2017–18
  - Corfu FCA Super Cup Winners: 2
    - 2006, 2013
