= Amateurs' Super Cup Greece =

- Founded: 2013
- Folded: 2017
- Country: Greece
- Confederation: UEFA
- Number of clubs: 2
- Last champions: Irodotos
- Most championships: AEL, Nestos Chrysoupoli, Irodotos (1)
- Website: epo.gr

The Amateurs' Super Cup Greece introduced from the 2013–14 season and was a single final played on a neutral ground, which sets the Hellenic Football Federation. In Amateurs' Super Cup Greece compete the winning team of Gamma Ethniki Cup with the winning team of Greek Football Amateur Cup for the emergence of the Greek Football Amateur Cup Winner for the season.

== The finals ==
Season	Winner Gamma Ethniki Cup	Winner Amateur Cup	Score	Stadium	Source
2014	AEL	Panerythraikos	2 – 1 ot (1 – 1)	Amfissa Municipal Stadium	
2015	Trikala	Nestos Chrysoupoli	0 – 3	Aiginio Municipal Stadium	
2016	Not held				
2017	Karaiskakis	Irodotos	0 – 1	Elefsina Municipal Stadium	

== See also ==
- Gamma Ethniki Cup
- Greek Football Amateur Cup
