= Gamma Ethniki Cup =

- Founded: 2013
- Folded: 2017
- Country: Greece
- Confederation: UEFA
- Number of clubs: 61
- Domestic cup: Amateurs' Super Cup Greece
- Last champions: Karaiskakis
- Most championships: AEL, Trikala, Karaiskakis (1)
- Website: epo.gr

The Gamma Ethniki Cup was a football competition cup introduced the 2013–14 season. Only the clubs of the new Football League 2 (Gamma Ethniki) are those that participate. The Gamma Ethniki Cup winner will compete at the end of the season with the winner of the Amateurs' Cup for Amateurs' Super Cup.

== Structure ==
The need of organization emerged in 2013, after the abolition of the professional third-tier level Football League 2, and subsequent creation of an amateur third-level Gamma Ethniki, initially with six groups, later reduced to four. The Hellenic Football Federation created a new competition, in which amateur clubs of the newly structured amateur Gamma Ethniki competed against each other in a Cup competition which would be more competitive than the cups of regional football associations. The participation of all teams of Gamma Ethniki is obligatory. As of 2016, the competition structure is as follows:

- In the First Round of the competition, the clubs in each group compete against each other in single matches (overtime and penalties apply) until one club is declared Group winner. The pairs are a result of random drawing.
- In the Second Round (Semi-finals), the four Group winners compete after drawing in single knockout matches, and the two winners advance to the final.
- The Final is played on neutral ground, which is decided by the Hellenic Football Federation. In case of a tie, overtime and penalties apply.

== The finals ==
Season	Winner	Finalist	Score	Stadium	source
2013−14	AEL	Panelefsiniakos	2 – 1	Levadia Municipal Stadium	
2014−15	Trikala	Ethnikos Piraeus	3 – 2	Amfissa Municipal Stadium	
2015−16	Not held				
2016−17	Karaiskakis	Achaiki	1 – 0	Panetolikos Stadium	
2017−18	Not held				

== See also ==
- Amateurs' Super Cup Greece
