= Olympos Kerkyra F.C. =

Olympos Kerkyra
- Full name: Athlitikos Podosfairikos Syllogos Olympos Garitsa Kerkyra
- Founded: 1934; 92 years ago
- Ground: Olympos Stadium
- Capacity: 1,000
- Chairman: Christos Kasimis
- Manager: Giannis Kaloudis
- League: Corfu FCA First Division
- 2025–26: Corfu FCA First Division, 6th

Olympos Kerkyra F.C. is a Greek football club, based in Corfu, Corfu (regional unit).

The club was founded in 1934. The team is the oldest active football club in Corfu and the only one with its own stadium.

They played in Football League 2 for the season 2013-14. The Olympos FC Academy partnered with AEK Academy for the seasons 2014 - 2017.

In May 2025, the team announced elections for new administration. In June 2025, the team elected team president Fotis Sklavounos to oversee the club's board of directors.

== Honours ==
- Corfu FCA Championship: 16 (1959–60, 1965–66, 1967–68, 1969–70, 1970–71, 1971–72, 1972–73, 1973–74, 1974–75, 1977–78, 1979–80, 1982–83, 1996–97, 2002–03, 2007–08, 2009–10)
- Corfu FCA Cup: 17 (1961–62, 1962–63, 1964–65, 1969–70, 1970–71, 1972–73, 1979–80, 1980–81, 1981–82, 1984–85, 1988–89, 1989–90, 1992–93, 2002–03, 2005–06, 2010–11, 2012–13)
- Corfu FCA Super Cup: 3 (2010, 2011, 2013)
