= Irodotos FC =

Irodotos
- Full name: Αθλητικός Σύλλογος Νέας Αλικαρνασσού Νέος Ηρόδοτος; Athlitikos Sýllogos Neas Alikarnassoú Iródotos (Irodotos Sports Club of New Halicarnassus)
- Short name: Iródotos
- Founded: 18 June 1932; 94 years ago
- Ground: Nea Alikarnassos Municipal Stadium
- Capacity: 1,500
- Chairman: Michalis Georgiadis
- Manager: Sakis Georgopoulos
- League: Heraklion FCA First Division
- 2025–26: Heraklion FCA Second Division, 1st (promoted)
- Website: https://irodotosbc.com/
Home colours	Away colours

Irodotos Football Club, short for Athlitikós Sýllogos Neas Alikarnassoú Iródotos (Greek: Αθλητικός Σύλλογος Νέας Αλικαρνασσού Νέος Ηρόδοτος, meaning Irodotos Sports Club of New Halicarnassus) and also simply known as Irodotos, is a Greek football club based in Nea Alikarnassos, Heraklion. The club is named after the ancient historian Herodotus, descended from Halicarnassus, Asia Minor, whose bust is also used as the club logo. Irodotos was established in 1932 by refugees from Asia Minor (and specifically the site of modern Bodrum, then still called Halicarnassus), who were displaced following the Greco-Turkish War in 1922. By acclamation, Irodotos is considered the third most successful club in Heraklion in terms of achievements, due to its consistent presence in the Second and Third national divisions, but has maintained a considerable fan base, and a longstanding rivalry with local Super League side OFI, despite the fact the two haven't met in national competitions for almost 30 years. The club currently competes in the Heraklion FCA First Division, the fourth tier of the Greek football league system, while also administering amateur men's football and basketball departments. In the past it also had departments for wrestling, cycling, women's football and athletics. Its colours are blue and white.

== History ==
Former crest of the club

The 2025–26 logo

=== Early years and legacy ===
Several years after the public housing development of Nea Alikarnassos was founded (in 1925), former Halicarnassus residents and refugees established a sports club in order to strengthen the collective consciousness ties between the inhabitants of the settlement. The club was named after Herodotus (Greek: Ηρόδοτος), thus commemorating the ancient historian native to Halicarnassus. The club was officially established as Podosferikos Athlitikos Syllogos Alikarnassou Irodotos (or P.A.S.A. Irodotos) by then community president, Michalis Eleftheriadis and other prominent figures of the refugee community. In its early years, and until the end of the German occupation of Crete, Irodotos' sporting activities were primarily mild, before reverting to full activity in 1948.

Irodotos joined the Third Division of the regional Heraklion Football Clubs Association, managing consecutive promotions to reach the First Division and compete against historical clubs such as OFI and Ergotelis. Irodotos promoted to national competitions (e.g. the Beta Ethniki, second tier of the Greek football league system) in 1960, and played in the competition until 1965, when the club was relegated to the newly established Gamma Ethniki (third level in the league pyramid). In total, Irodotos has played 12 seasons in the Second National Division (relegated for the last time in 1982) and 16 times in the Gamma Ethniki, thus making it the club with the third most appearances in professional competitions based in Heraklion, behind ex-Greek Super League local rivals OFI and Ergotelis. Furthermore, Irodotos has reached the Greek Football Cup Quarter-finals once in 1987–88 (losing to competition finalists Panathinaikos) and the Round of 16 twice, the first time during the 1981−82 season (eliminated by eventual competition winners AEK Athrns) and for a second time during 1988−89, when they were eliminated by club rival OFI.

=== Recent years ===
In recent years, Irodotos have played primarily in the Gamma Ethniki, from which they were last relegated in the end of the 2014–15 season after being deducted fifteen points by the Hellenic Football Federation in response to the murder of visiting fan Kostas Katsoulis by Irodotos hooligans in the municipal Nea Alikarnassos Stadium during a Football League 2 home match vs. Ethnikos Piraeus.

After the tragic incidents that took place in 2015, Irodotos made a triumphant return to the Gamma Ethniki winning four trophies in a single season during 2016−17. More specifically, Irodotos was crowned champion of the Heraklion FCA Championship, while also managing to win the Heraklion FCA Cup, along with the Greek Football Amateur Cup and eventually the Greek Amateurs' Super Cup. Their next season in the Gamma Ethniki saw them win the Group 8 title and qualify to the Football League promotion play-offs, where they eventually celebrated their return to the 2nd tier of the Greek football league system after a 36-year absence.

== Honours ==
=== Domestic ===
==== Leagues ====
- Third Division
  - Winners (1): 1975–76
- Fourth Division
  - Winners (3): 1991–92, 2003–04, 2020–21

==== Cups ====
- Greek Football Amateur Cup
  - Winners (1): 2016–17
- Amateurs' Super Cup Greece
  - Winners (1): 2016–17

=== Regional ===
==== Leagues ====
- Heraklion FCA Championship
  - Winners (7): 1964−65, 1968−69, 1971−72, 1975−76, 2000−01, 2001−02, 2016−17, 2024–25

==== Cups ====
- Heraklion FCA Cup
  - Winners (8): 1975−76, 1994−95, 2001−02, 2005−06, 2007−08, 2012−13, 2015−16, 2016−17
