= Greek Football Amateur Cup =

Men's association football cup in Greece

Greece Amateurs Cup
- Organiser(s): Hellenic Football Federation
- Founded: 1971; 55 years ago
- Region: Greece
- Teams: 98
- Related competitions: Gamma Ethniki; F.C.A. Cups
- Current champions: Trikala (1st title)
- Most championships: Aiolikos, Phoebus Kremasti (2 titles)
- Website: www.epo.gr
- 2026–27

The Greek Amateur Cup (Greek: Ελληνικό Ερασιτεχνικό Κύπελλο), officially known as the Greece Amateurs Cup (Greek: Κύπελλο Ερασιτεχνών Ελλάδας), is the Greek competition for clubs of the nationwide Gamma Ethniki and the regional F.C.A. Cups, organised by the Hellenic Football Federation. It was founded in 1971 featuring the winners of the F.C.A. Cups in a knock-out format. The competition always featured clubs from the fourth-tier Delta Ethniki and later the third-tier Gamma Ethniki. Despite the fact that the word anateur has been used in the competition's name since its inception, the Gamma Ethniki teams participating are considered professional, while the Delta Ethniki teams were semi-professional. It is Greece's second most important cup competition after the Greek Football Cup that features teams from the top two tiers.

== History ==
The competition started in the 1971-72 due to the high volume of teams competing in the Greek Football Cup. It was played in two stages: the prefectures with the local finals and the panhellenic which would decide the overall winner. With the Amateur Cup running in the 1971-72 season, the Greek Football Cup would only accept teams from the first three tiers for the years to come.

After the introduction of the Gamma Ethniki Cup in 2013 the winner of the competition would play in the Amateurs' Super Cup Greece. The competition was abolished in 2018 but restored in 2025, this time with compulsory participation of Gamma Ethniki teams and optional participation of teams that won the local F.C.A. Cups the previous season.

Players like Giorgos Karagounis, Vasilis Dimitriadis, Sakis Tsiolis, Angelos Basinas, Kostas Chalkias, Giannis Goumas, Babis Tennes, Kostas Orfanos, Nikos Soultanidis have played in second stage or the final of the competition (panhellenic), while numerous later-well known players who started their careers from lower leagues featured in the first stage (prefectures). Alexis Alexandris, Demis Nikolaidis, Kyriakos Karataidis, Zisis Vryzas, Theodoros Zagorakis are some of them.

== Structure ==
The competition was split into two stages. The first stage listed the knock-out matches in every prefecture of Greece such as Athens Football Clubs Association, Macedonia Football Clubs Association. Clubs participated in semiprofessional Delta Ethniki until 2013 and professional Gamma Ethniki after 2013 were eligible to participate. The second stage featured the prefectures' Cup winners in knock-out rounds culminating with a single final.

- 1st stage: FCA Cups
- 2nd stage: Winners of the FCA Cups and Gamma Ethniki teams

The reserve teams of top clubs were also eligible to participate. Panathinaikos, PAOK and Aris Thessaloniki reserve (or called amateur) teams reached the final of the Cup on three occasions. The majority of the teams who won the Cup were playing in the 4th or 5th tier including clubs with Greek top-flight history like Niki Volos, Kerkyra and Veria.

== Finals ==
| Season | Finalist 1 | Score | Finalist 2 | Venue |
|---|---|---|---|---|
| 1971–72 | Alexandroupoli GS | 2 – 3 | Phoebus Kremasti | Georgios Karaiskakis Stadium, Piraeus |
| 1972–73 | Dafni Erythres | 1 – 1; 6 – 5 on pens | Pelopas Kiato | Neapoli Stadium, Nikaia, Attica |
| 1973–74 | Olympiakos Loutraki | 3 – 1 | P.A.O. Koryfi Veria | Peristeri Stadium, Peristeri (Athens) |
| 1974–75 | AO Rethymno | 2 – 5 | PAOK Amateurs | Leoforos Alexandras Stadium, Athens |
| 1975–76 | Niki Volos | 2 – 1 | P.A.O. Rouf | Lamia Municipal Stadium, Lamia |
| 1976–77 | Anthoupoli Larissa | 0 – 2 | AO Karditsa | Volos Stadium, Volos |
| 1977–78 | Doxa Megalopoli | 0 – 1 | Panaspropyrgiakos | Tavros Stadium, Tavros (Athens) |
| 1978–79 | Pandramaikos | 3 – 3; 7 – 8 on pens | APO Chios | Neapoli Stadium, Nikaia Piraeus |
| 1979–80 | AE Didymoteicho | 1 – 0 | AO Neapoli | Lysandros Kaftanzoglou, Thessaloniki |
| 1980–81 | Anagennisi Karditsa | 1 – 0 | Paniliakos | Tavros Stadium, Tavros, Athens |
| 1981–82 | Aiolikos | 3 – 2 | AO Nea Artaki | Tavros Stadium, Tavros, Athens |
| 1982–83 | AO Arta | 0 – 2 | Ergotelis | Leoforos Alexandras Stadium, Athens |
| 1983–84 | Niki Diikitiriou | 1 – 1; 4 – 2 on pens | Atsalenios | Olympic Stadium; Athens |
| 1984–85 | Omiros Neochori | 1 – 2 | Aris Amateurs | Olympic Stadium, Athens |
| 1985–86 | Pandramaikos | 0 – 0; 4 – 2 on pens | APS Patras | Georgios Karaiskakis, Piraeus |
| 1986–87 | Aias Gastouni | 2 – 1 | PAS Giannina | Georgios Karaiskakis, Piraeus |
| 1987–88 | Megas Alexandros Orfani | 1 – 0 | Phoebus Kremasti | Egaleo Stadium, Egaleo |
| 1988–89 | Anagennisi Giannitsa | 5 – 0 | E.G.O.I. | Georgios Karaiskakis, Piraeus |
| 1989–90 | Spartacos Thessaloniki | 2 – 2; 6 – 5 on pens | Agios Nikolaos | Leoforos Alexandras Stadium, Athens |
| 1990–91 | Thiva | 1 – 1; 4 – 6 on pens | Pelopas Kiato | Leoforos Alexandras Stadium, Athens |
| 1991–92 | Kerkyra | 0 – 0; 1 – 3 on pens | Aspida Xanthi | Leoforos Alexandras Stadium, Athens |
| 1992–93 | A.E. Kalampaki | 1 – 1; 6 – 7 on pens | Kozani | Aris Stadium, Thessaloniki |
| 1993–94 | Panathinaikos Amateurs | 2 – 0 | Ermis Ermioni | Georgios Karaiskakis, Piraeus |
| 1994–95 | Poseidon Nea Michaniona | 0 – 0; 5 – 4 on pens | Keratsini | Trikala Stadium, Trikala |
| 1995–96 | Ethnikos Katerini | 2 – 1 | Iraklis Larissa | Evosmos Stadium, Evosmos (Thessaloniki) |
| 1996–97 | Ionia Chania | 1 – 0 | Pontioi Rodopi | Leoforos Alexandras Stadium, Athens |
| 1997–98 | Akratitos | 3 – 1 | Kilkisiakos | Olympic Stadium, Marousi |
| 1998–99 | Chalkidon / Near-East | 3 – 2 a.e.t. | Olympiacos Chersonissos | Grigorios Lambrakis, Zografou (Athens) |
| 1999–2000 | PANO Malia | 2 – 1 | Orfeas Souroti | Nea Smyrni Stadium, Nea Smyrni (Athens) |
| 2000–01 | Thrasyvoulos | 2 – 1 | Poseidon Neon Poron | Stylida Stadium; Stylida |
| 2001–02 | Aiolikos | 4 – 2 | Almopia Aridea | Levadia Municipal Stadium; Levadia |
| 2002–03 | Veria | 2 – 1 | PAS Preveza | Sofades Stadium; Sofades |
| 2003–04 | Haidari | 3 – 0 | Aiolikos | Kiato Stadium, Kiato |
| 2004–05 | Keravnos Keratea | 3 – 0 | Orfeas Souroti | Municipal Stadium of Volos, Volos |
| 2005–06 | not held | | | |
| 2006–07 | Doxa Megalopoli | 1 – 0 | Kilkisiakos | Municipal Athletic Center of Lamia, Lamia |
| 2007–08 | Panargiakos | 3 – 0 | Niki Polygyros | Municipal Athletic Center of Lamia, Lamia |
| 2008–09 | Volida Garounas | 4 – 3 | Aspropyrgos | Municipal Athletic Center of Mesolonghi, Mesolonghi |
| 2009–10 | Enosi Midea | 1 – 0 | Ethnikos Vatero | Levadia Municipal Stadium, Levadia |
| 2010–11 | Asteras Magoula | 2 – 0 | Agrotis Lianokladi | Chalkis Municipal Stadium, Chalkis |
| 2011–12 | not held | | | |
| 2012–13 | Phoebus Kremasti | 2 – 1 | Panarkadikos | Psachna Municipal Stadium, Psachna |
| 2013–14 | Panerythraikos | 2 – 1 | Ermis Kiveri | Corinth Municipal Stadium, Corinth |
| 2014–15 | Nestos Chrysoupoli | 2 – 0 | Thyella Rafina | Karditsa Municipal Stadium, Karditsa |
| 2015–16 | Pydna Kitros | 1 – 0 | Ialysos | Peristeri Stadium, Peristeri, Attica |
| 2016–17 | Irodotos | 1 – 0 | Elpis Skoutari | Spata Municipal Stadium, Spata |
| 2017–18 | O.F. Ierapetra | 2 – 0 | Niki Volos | Keratsini Municipal Stadium, Keratsini, Piraeus |
| 2018–25 | not held | | | |
| 2025–26 | Trikala | 2 – 1 | Panthrakikos | Sykies Municipal Athletic Center, Sykies, Thessaloniki |

== See also ==
- Greek Football Cup
- Gamma Ethniki
- Local football championships of Greece
- Amateurs' Super Cup Greece
- Gamma Ethniki Cup
- Football records and statistics in Greece
