= 2021–22 Greek Football Cup =

2021–22 Greek Cup

Tournament details
- Country: Greece
- Teams: 119

Final positions
- Champions: Panathinaikos (19th title)
- Runners-up: PAOK

Tournament statistics
- Matches played: 128
- Goals scored: 325 (2.54 per match)
- Top goal scorer(s): Vangelis Tsevanedis (6 goals)

The 2021–22 Greek Football Cup was the 80th edition of the Greek Football Cup. The winner of the Cup qualified for the next season's Europa Conference League third qualifying round.

== Calendar ==
Round	Date(s)	Fixtures	Clubs	New entries	Leagues entering
First Round	28, 29 August & 5 September 2021	36	128 → 89	79	Gamma Ethniki
Second Round	11, 12 September 2021	20	89 → 69	none	none
Third Round	25, 26, 29 September 2021	23	69 → 46	26	Super League 2
Fourth Round	6 October 2021	9	46 → 34	none	none
Fifth Round	26, 27 October & 3 November 2021	12	28 → 16	10	Super League 1, places 5–14
Round of 16	1, 2, 22, 23 December 2021	16	16 → 8	4	Super League 1, places 1–4
Quarter-finals	19, 20, 26 January & 9 February 2022	8	8 → 4	none	none
Semi-finals	20, 21 & 27 April 2022	4	4 → 2	none	none
Final	21 May 2022	1	2 → 1	none	none

== Qualifying rounds ==
=== First round ===
The draw took place on 12 August 2021.

==== Summary ====
Team 1	Score	Team 2
28 August 2021
AE Lefkimmi	3–2 (a.e.t.)	Atromitos Palamas
Kozani	2–1	Dimitra Efxeinoupolis
AO Poros	0–0 (3–4 p)	Aias Salamina
A.O. Agios Nikolaos	2–0	Kyanos Asteras Vari
29 August 2021
A.E. Neapoli	0–3	Aittitos Spata
Proodeftiki	2–0	Santorini
Panionios	0–3 (w/o)	APO Atalanti
Nafpaktiakos Asteras	0–3	Tilikratis
AO Ypato	7–1	Amvrakikos Loutro
Ermis Meligou	3–2	Foinikas Nea Epidavros
Aris Skala	1–0	Enosi Ermionida
Diagoras Vrachnaiika	3–0 (w/o)	Zakynthos
AO Nea Artaki	1–0	PAO Varda
Ilioupoli	4–0	Aias Gastouni
Fostiras	1–2	Panachaiki
Poseidon Nea Michaniona	4–1 (a.e.t.)	Apollon Paralimnio
Apollon Pontus	0–3 (w/o)	Makedonikos
Edessaikos	2–0	Ethnikos Neo Keramidi
Megas Alexandros Trikala	1–0	Iraklis Ampelokipi
Alexandroupoli	2–0	Thermaikos
Orfeas Xanthi	0–4	Agrotikos Asteras
Anagennisi Giannitsa	1–2	Aris Avato
Ethnikos Sochos	1–0	Nestos Chrysoupoli
Thyella Sarakinoi	1–3	Pandramaikos
Anagennisi Plagia	2–1	Megas Alexandros Orfano
Panagriniakos	0–0 (4–3 p)	Iraklis Larissa
P.O. Fiki	1–0	Anagennisi Arta
Acheron Kanallaki	2–0	Aetos Makrychori
O.F.A.M.	0–1	Theseus Agria
Asteras Kalirachi	1–2 (a.e.t.)	Amvrysseas
Giouchtas	1–0	Almyros
5 September 2021
Anagennisi Ierapetra	0–1	Keratsini
AE Mykonos	1–4	Ethnikos Piraeus
Ethnikos Skoulikado	1–3	Diavolitsi
Aiolikos	1–1 (6–7 p)	Panelefsiniakos
Aris Souda	3–0	Karavas
Atsalenios	3–2	Pyli Kos
PAO Rouf	4–0	Panegialios
AEP Kozani	0–3	P.O. Elassona
N/A
Charavgiakos	bye	

==== Matches ====
28 August 2021
17:00 EEST

AE Lefkimmi	3–2 (a.e.t.)	Atromitos Palamas
Pantazis 26'; Tsevanedis 43'; Ciptiu 120+1'	Report	Kokkinos 14'; Kontos 51'

Lefkimmi Municipal Stadium, Lefkimmi
Referee: Konstantinos Neos (Epirus)

28 August 2021
17:00 EEST

Kozani	2–1	Dimitra Efxeinoupolis
Iordanidis 11' (pen.); Bakalis 45+1'	Report	Vourdakis 34'

Kozani Stadium, Kozani
Referee: Christos Nitsas (Larissa)

28 August 2021
17:00 EEST

AO Poros	0–0 (a.e.t.)	Aias Salamina
	Report
Penalties
Raptis (penalty missed); Pilios (penalty scored); Pagonis (penalty scored); Kastellianakis (penalty scored); Nakas (penalty missed)	3–4	(penalty scored) Zafiridis; (penalty scored) Liatos; (penalty scored) Xhaferi; (penalty scored) Katidis

Atsalenios Stadium, Heraklion
Referee: Dimitris Moschou (Lasithi)

28 August 2021
17:00 EEST

A.O. Agios Nikolaos	2–0	Kyanos Asteras Vari
Makrakis 60' (pen.); Anyfantakis 90+1'	Report

Agios Nikolaos Municipal Stadium, Agios Nikolaos
Referee: Nikolaos Mavrantonakis (Chios)

29 August 2021
17:00 EEST

A.E. Neapoli	0–3	Aittitos Spata
	Report	Papanikolaou 49'; Katseris 64', 76'

Neapoli Municipal Stadium, Neapoli
Referee: Emmanouil Maladennakis (Chios)

29 August 2021
17:00 EEST

Proodeftiki	2–0	Santorini
Makridis 39'; Krishtan 53'	Report

Nikaia Municipal Stadium, Nikaia
Referee: Giorgos Fitsas (West Attica)

29 August 2021
17:00 EEST

Panionios	0–3 (Awarded)	APO Atalanti
	Report

Nea Smyrni Stadium, Nea Smyrni

29 August 2021
17:00 EEST

Nafpaktiakos Asteras	0–3	Tilikratis
	Report	Toska 4' (pen.); Simoni 54'; Azoudis 76'

Papacharalabeio Ethniko Stadio, Nafpaktos
Referee: Leonidas Tzovas (Epirus)

29 August 2021
17:00 EEST

AO Ypato	7–1	Amvrakikos Loutro
Spiliotis 6', 84'; Bourous 49'; Queijo 64'; Lima 69'; Niklitsiotis 78', 80'	Report	Spanos 79'

Thebes Municipal Stadium, Thebes
Referee: Georgios Fosteris (East Attica)

29 August 2021
17:00 EEST

Ermis Meligou	3–2	Foinikas Nea Epidavros
Buxton 5'; Ruca 57' (pen.); Bissias 59'	Report	Markou 31'; Kaplantzis 87'

Meligos Stadium, Meligos
Referee: Dimitris Vartsakis (Laconia)

29 August 2021
17:00 EEST

Aris Skala	1–0	Enosi Ermionida
Stamogiannos 65'	Report

Skala Stadium, Skala
Referee: Ilias Kokkoris (Arcadia)

29 August 2021
17:00 EEST

Diagoras Vrachnaiika	3–0 (Awarded)	Zakynthos
	Report

Vrachnaiika Municipal Stadium, Vrachnaiika

29 August 2021
17:00 EEST

AO Nea Artaki	1–0	PAO Varda
Delekos 65'	Report

Nea Artaki Municipal Stadium, Nea Artaki
Referee: Stefanos Xirogiannis (Boeotia)

29 August 2021
17:00 EEST

Ilioupoli	4–0	Aias Gastouni
Kraci 15', 44'; Tavares 85'; Tsatsaris 90'	Report

Ilioupoli Municipal Stadium, Ilioupoli
Referee: Athanasios Zacharopoulos (East Attica)

29 August 2021
17:00 EEST

Fostiras	1–2	Panachaiki
Bernidakis 4' (pen.)	Report	Chanti 47'; Bourlakis 75'

Spyros Gialampidis Stadium, Tavros
Referee: Aristidis Aliagas (West Attica)

29 August 2021
17:00 EEST

Poseidon Nea Michaniona	4–1 (a.e.t.)	Apollon Paralimnio
Koutsikovangelis 87'; Ignatidis 101' (pen.), 115', 118'	Report	Gakis 31'

Nea Michaniona Stadium, Michaniona
Referee: Georgios Aslanidis (Pieria)

29 August 2021
17:00 EEST

Apollon Pontus	0–3 (Awarded)	Makedonikos
	Report

Kalamaria Stadium, Kalamaria

29 August 2021
17:00 EEST

Edessaikos	2–0	Ethnikos Neo Keramidi
Kyziridis 85', 90+2'	Report

Municipal Stadium of Edessa, Edessa
Referee: Thomas Mavridis (Imathia)

29 August 2021
17:00 EEST

Megas Alexandros Trikala	1–0	Iraklis Ampelokipi
Vasiltsis 12'	Report

Trikala Municipal Stadium, Trikala
Referee: Konstantinos Sidiropoulos (Pella)

29 August 2021
17:00 EEST

Alexandroupoli	2–0	Thermaikos
Pagonidis 19'; Roubies 70'	Report

Alexandroupoli Stadium, Alexandroupoli
Referee: Ioannis Tomaras (Thrace)

29 August 2021
17:00 EEST

Orfeas Xanthi	0–4	Agrotikos Asteras
	Report	Katsiakis 28'; Avramidis 30'; Boulgouridis 72'; Papakonstantinou 82'

Xanthi Ground, Xanthi
Referee: Aristotelis Kostoulas (Arta)

29 August 2021
17:00 EEST

Anagennisi Giannitsa	1–2	Aris Avato
Mylonas 7'	Report	Gekas 24'; Vafiadis 65'

Giannitsa Municipal Stadium, Giannitsa
Referee: Konstantinos Foustanas (Macedonia)

29 August 2021
17:00 EEST

Ethnikos Sochos	1–0	Nestos Chrysoupoli
Karabatakis 18'	Report

Sochos Municipal Stadium, Thessaloniki
Referee: Athanasios Dragousis (Kilkis)

29 August 2021
17:00 EEST

Thyella Sarakinoi	1–3	Pandramaikos
Dagaris 61'	Report	Giannopoulos 4'; Beroukas 35'; Pavlidis 89'

Sarakinoi Municipal Stadium, Sarakinoi
Referee: Nikolaos Theodoropoulos (Florina)

29 August 2021
17:00 EEST

Anagennisi Plagia	2–1	Megas Alexandros Orfano
Parpoutsis 28'; Serteridis 34'	Report	Tsolakidis 61'

Kilkis Municipal Stadium, Kilkis
Referee: Konstantinos Safoulis-Argyropoulos (Serres)

29 August 2021
17:00 EEST

Panagriniakos	0–0 (a.e.t.)	Iraklis Larissa
	Report
Penalties
Golias (penalty scored); Milios (penalty scored); Kantanis (penalty missed); Sotiropoulos (penalty scored); Vasilogiannis (penalty scored)	4–3	(penalty scored) Chasomeris; (penalty scored) Chatziliontas; (penalty missed) Papageorgiou; (penalty missed) Kakavitsis; (penalty scored) Galitsios

Municipal Stadium of Agios Konstantinos, Agios Konstantinos
Referee: Alexandros Fokas (Achaea)

29 August 2021
17:00 EEST

P.O. Fiki	1–0	Anagennisi Arta
Ioannou 62'	Report

Fiki Municipal Stadium, Trikala
Referee: Thomas Bourouzikas (Larissa)

29 August 2021
17:00 EEST

Acheron Kanallaki	2–0	Aetos Makrychori
Rovinas 19', 35'	Report

Kanallaki Municipal Stadium, Preveza
Referee: Dimitrios Chatzipanagiotou (Epirus)

29 August 2021
17:00 EEST

O.F.A.M.	0–1	Theseus Agria
	Report	Papadopoulos 12' (o.g.)

Tasos Kapodistrias Stadium, Agios Mathaios
Referee: Eirini Piggiou (Thesprotia)

29 August 2021
17:00 EEST

Asteras Kalirachi	1–2 (a.e.t.)	Amvrysseas
Stergiopoulos 32'	Report	Kakos 47'; Kypreos 109'

Kalirachis Municipal Stadium, Kalirachi
Referee: Sotiris Petsas (Trikala)

29 August 2021
17:00 EEST

Giouchtas	1–0	Almyros
Katsikokeris 17'	Report

Archanes National Stadium, Heraklion
Referee: Michail Tampouratzis (Lasithi)

5 September 2021
14:00 EEST

Anagennisi Ierapetra	0–1	Keratsini
	Report	Konstantinidis 71'

Petros Vouzounerakis Stadium, Ierapetra
Referee: Alexandros Zafiris (Heraklion)

5 September 2021
14:00 EEST

AE Mykonos	1–4	Ethnikos Piraeus
Lesaj 19'	Report	Daflas 47'; Samios 53', 57' (pen.); Diakos 65'

Korfos Municipal Stadium, Korfos
Referee: Ioannis Stergiotis (Athens)

5 September 2021
16:00 EEST

Ethnikos Skoulikado	1–3	Diavolitsi
Tsoukalas 17'	Report	Mouliatos 57', 73'; Gelkeria 78'

Machairado Municipal Stadium, Machairado
Referee: Vasilios Tsakalis (Elis)

5 September 2021
17:00 EEST

Aiolikos	1–1 (a.e.t.)	Panelefsiniakos
Kouroupis 90+4'	Report	Lazaridis 25'
Penalties
Takidis (penalty scored); Apostolopoulos (penalty scored); Kritikos (penalty scored); Kouroupis (penalty scored); Gioukaris (penalty missed); Pinheiro (penalty scored); Protoulis (penalty scored); Kesidis (penalty missed); Vrontaras (penalty missed)	6–7	(penalty scored) Lamprou; (penalty scored) Antonakopoulos; (penalty scored) Bousis; (penalty missed) Maris; (penalty scored) Makridis; (penalty scored) Fofana; (penalty scored) Muskaj; (penalty missed) Andriopoulos; (penalty scored) Mandamadiotis

Mytilene Municipal Stadium, Mytilene
Referee: Ioannis Tsatsoulis (Athens)

5 September 2021
17:00 EEST

Aris Souda	3–0	Karavas
Papathanassiou 5'; Tsitas 12', 40'	Report

Souda National Stadium, Souda
Referee: Rafail Stavroulakis (Rethymno)

5 September 2021
17:00 EEST

Atsalenios	3–2	Pyli Kos
Kaimakamoudis 15'; Oliveira 37'; Patiniotis 53' (pen.)	Report	Iliopoulos 80'; Samouilidis 87' (o.g.)

Atsalenios Stadium, Heraklion
Referee: Nikolaos Georgopoulos (Chania)

5 September 2021
17:00 EEST

PAO Rouf	4–0	Panegialios
Vernardos 6', 51'; Mantzios 53'; Nitsakis 87'	Report

Rouf Municipal Stadium, Rouf
Referee: Georgios Bachaloutis (Piraeus)

5 September 2021
17:00 EEST

AEP Kozani	0–3	P.O. Elassona
	Report	Mouxios 8'; Karagounis 25'; Goudroubis 65'

Rouf Municipal Stadium, Rouf
Referee: Vasileios Polychroniou (Kastoria)

=== Second round ===
The draw took place on 6 September 2021.

==== Summary ====
Team 1	Score	Team 2
11 September 2021
Tilikratis	4–4 (3–5 p)	AE Lefkimmi
Makedonikos	0–1	AO Ypato
Panagriniakos	2–0	P.O. Elassona
Theseus Agria	1–0	Megas Alexandros Trikala
Diagoras Vrachnaiika	3–0	Ermis Meligou
12 September 2021
A.O. Agios Nikolaos	3–2	Panelefsiniakos
Giouchtas	1–1 (4–2 p)	Aittitos Spata
Ethnikos Sochos	3–0	Agrotikos Asteras
Kozani	2–0	Pandramaikos
Edessaikos	3–0	Aris Avato
Anagennisi Plagia	0–2	Poseidon Nea Michaniona
P.O. Fiki	1–0	Amvrysseas
Alexandroupoli	1–1 (3–4 p)	Acheron Kanallaki
Ethnikos Piraeus	3–0	Keratsini
Diavolitsi	1–3 (a.e.t.)	PAO Rouf
Aias Salamina	0–2	Panachaiki
APO Atalanti	0–1	AO Nea Artaki
Proodeftiki	2–1	Aris Skala
Atsalenios	3–3 (3–4 p)	Ilioupoli
Aris Souda	2–1	Charavgiakos

==== Matches ====
11 September 2021
15:00 EEST

Tilikratis	4–4 (a.e.t.)	AE Lefkimmi
Niklitsiotis 20', 115'; Simoni 29', 75'	Report	Tsevanedis 14', 45+2' (pen.), 115'; Poulimenos 88'
Penalties
Toska (penalty scored); Simoni (penalty scored); Niklitsiotis (penalty scored); Azoudis (penalty missed)	3–5	(penalty scored) Grigoriadis; (penalty scored) Tsevanedis; (penalty scored) Nikić; (penalty scored) Kostakiotis; (penalty scored) Ciptiu

Lefkada Stadium, Lefkada
Referee: Dimitris Chatzipanagiotou (Epirus)

11 September 2021
16:00 EEST

Makedonikos	0–1	AO Ypato
	Report	Spiliotis 22'

Makedonikos Stadium, Thessaloniki
Referee: Akis Argyros (Pella)

11 September 2021
16:00 EEST

Panagriniakos	2–0	P.O. Elassona
Sotiropoulos 21'; Vasilogiannis 72'	Report

Agioi Anargyroi Municipal Stadium, Agioi Anargyroi
Referee: Vangelis Safarikas (Achaea)

11 September 2021
16:00 EEST

Theseus Agria	1–0	Megas Alexandros Trikala
Kotzathanasis 2'	Report

Agria Municipal Stadium, Agria
Referee: Konstantinos Kechagias (West Attica)

11 September 2021
16:00 EEST

Diagoras Vrachnaiika	3–0	Ermis Meligou
Sideris 27'; Alexandris 37', 43'	Report

Vrachnaiika Municipal Stadium, Vrachnaiika
Referee: Ioannis Routsis (Corinthia)

12 September 2021
15:00 EEST

A.O. Agios Nikolaos	3–2	Panelefsiniakos
Mavris 34', 45'; Nokaj 75'	Report	Fofana 21'; Vangelis 90+2'

Agios Nikolaos Municipal Stadium, Agios Nikolaos
Referee: Rafail Stavroulakis (Rethymno)

12 September 2021
15:00 EEST

Giouchtas	1–1 (a.e.t.)	Aittitos Spata
Domatas 4'	Report	Prendi 33'
Penalties
Domatas (penalty scored); Fragoulakis (penalty scored); Plousis (penalty scored); Geladaris (penalty scored)	4–2	(penalty missed) Lampridis; (penalty scored) Prapas; (penalty scored) Katseris; (penalty missed) Michailidis

Acharnes Stadium, Acharnes
Referee: Nikos Tringas (Chania)

12 September 2021
16:00 EEST

Ethnikos Sochos	3–0	Agrotikos Asteras
Tachmatzidis 17'; Karabatakis 40'; Dimitrakoudis 69'	Report

Sochos Municipal Stadium, Thessaloniki
Referee: Stefanos Dimitriadis (Chalkidiki)

12 September 2021
16:00 EEST

Kozani	2–0	Pandramaikos
Kontaxis 48' (o.g.); Nanos 69'	Report

Kozani Stadium, Kozani
Referee: Sotiris Petsas (Trikala)

12 September 2021
16:00 EEST

Edessaikos	3–0	Aris Avato
Avramidis 35'; Melikiotis 47'; Milonas 85'	Report

Municipal Stadium of Edessa, Edessa
Referee: Athanasios Boutsikos (Macedonia)

12 September 2021
16:00 EEST

Anagennisi Plagia	0–2	Poseidon Nea Michaniona
	Report	Koutsikovangelis 30'; Ignatidis 49'

Kilkis Municipal Stadium, Kilkis
Referee: Dimitrios Gaitsis (Drama)

12 September 2021
16:00 EEST

P.O. Fiki	1–0	Amvrysseas
Gadias 77'	Report

Fiki Municipal Stadium, Trikala
Referee: Nontas Kolorizos (Phthiotis)

12 September 2021
16:00 EEST

Alexandroupoli	1–1 (a.e.t.)	Acheron Kanallaki
Stojnović 51'	Report	Vasiliadis 65'
Penalties
Patsioras (penalty scored); Maltezos (penalty missed); Papageorgiou (penalty scored); Abrahamian (penalty missed); Gaidatzis (penalty scored)	3–4	(penalty scored) Tsoutsis; (penalty scored) Kapias; (penalty scored) Fragos; (penalty missed) Zdravos-Rizos; (penalty scored) Kyriakis

Alexandroupoli Municipal Stadium, Alexandroupoli
Referee: Anastasios Tsilikas (Kavala)

12 September 2021
16:00 EEST

Ethnikos Piraeus	3–0	Keratsini
Stamos 33'; Samios 71'; Diakos 90'	Report

Grigoris Lambrakis Stadium, Kallithea
Referee: Panagiotis Karakidis (Cornith)

12 September 2021
16:00 EEST

Diavolitsi	1–3 (a.e.t.)	PAO Rouf
Mouliatos 50'	Report	Nitsakis 26'; Noutsos 103', 110'

Diavolitsi Municipal Stadium, Diavolitsi
Referee: Giannis Papageorgiou (Argolida)

12 September 2021
16:00 EEST

Aias Salamina	0–2	Panachaiki
	Report	Stasinopoulos 69'; Louskos 71'

Municipal Stadium of Salamina, Salamina
Referee: Giannis Kalogeropoulos (Athens)

12 September 2021
16:00 EEST

APO Atalanti	0–1	AO Nea Artaki
	Report	Papadakis 30'

Atalanti Municipal Stadium, Atalanti
Referee: Giorgos Panagiotaras (Athens)

12 September 2021
16:00 EEST

Proodeftiki	2–1	Aris Skala
Tsaftaridis 71'; Makrygiannis 90+3'	Report	Stamogiannos 54' (pen.)

Nikaia Stadium, Nikaia
Referee: Giannis Andrikopoulos (Cyclades)

12 September 2021
16:00 EEST

Atsalenios	3–3 (a.e.t.)	Ilioupoli
Oliveira 15'; Annitsakis 34'; Kaimakamoudis 43'	Report	Tavares 38'; Diniotakis 49'; Annitsakis 90+4' (o.g.)
Penalties
Kermenidis (penalty missed); Oliveira (penalty missed); Meireles (penalty scored); Chatziandreou (penalty scored); Patiniotis (penalty scored); Annitsakis (penalty missed)	3–4	(penalty scored) Samios; (penalty scored) Gangos; (penalty scored) Kritikos; (penalty missed) Papagiannopoulos; (penalty scored) Zelo; (penalty scored) Kraci

Atsalenios Stadium, Heraklion
Referee: Dimitris Moschou (Lasithi)

12 September 2021
16:00 EEST

Aris Souda	2–1	Charavgiakos
Tsitas 17'; Nikoltsis 87'	Report	Koutsoumpas 53'

Souda Municipal Stadium, Chania
Referee: Marios Viskadouros (Heraklion)

=== Third round ===
The draw took place on 21 September 2021.

==== Summary ====
Team 1	Score	Team 2
25 September 2021
Aris Souda	0–1	Diagoras
Ethnikos Piraeus	2–2 (2–4 p)	Proodeftiki
26 September 2021
OF Ierapetra	1–1 (3–4 p)	Kalamata
PAO Rouf	0–3	Ergotelis
AO Nea Artaki	1–2	A.E. Kifisia
Giouchtas	1–2 (a.e.t.)	A.O. Agios Nikolaos
Ilioupoli	2–0	Asteras Vlachioti
Diagoras Vrachnaiika	0–1	Panachaiki
Acheron Kanallaki	2–1 (a.e.t.)	Olympiacos Volos
Edessaikos	1–3	Kozani
AE Lefkimmi	2–1 (a.e.t.)	Apollon Pontus
Poseidon Nea Michaniona	0–5	Levadiakos
Karaiskakis	0–2	Xanthi
Apollon Larissa	0–3	AEL
Pierikos	1–2	Iraklis
Theseus Agria	2–2 (2–4 p)	Panserraikos
P.O. Fiki	0–1	Niki Volos
Panagriniakos	0–2	Trikala
Veria	0–1 (a.e.t.)	Anagennisi Karditsa
Ethnikos Sochos	0–1	AO Ypato
Thesprotos	1–2	Almopos Aridea
Kallithea	2–1 (a.e.t.)	Episkopi
29 September 2021
Egaleo	2–1 (a.e.t.)	Chania

==== Matches ====
25 September 2021
16:00 EEST

Aris Souda	0–1	Diagoras
	Report	Rougalas 90'

Perivolia Municipal Stadium, Chania
Referee: Christos Krasagakis (Heraklion)

25 September 2021
16:00 EEST

Ethnikos Piraeus	2–2 (a.e.t.)	Proodeftiki
Lygos 24'; Samios 56' (pen.)	Report	Megaritis 65'; Nomikos 77'
Penalties
	2–4

Grigoris Lambrakis Stadium, Kallithea
Referee: Andreas Vlachos (East Attica)

26 September 2021
15:00 EEST

O.F. Ierapetra	1–1 (a.e.t.)	Kalamata
Andereggen 91'	Report	Tselepidis 115'
Penalties
Messidoro (penalty scored); Benítez (penalty scored); Lemonis (penalty missed); Cataldi (penalty scored); Di Lorenzo (penalty missed)	3–4	(penalty missed) Tatos; (penalty scored) Walisson; (penalty scored) Loukinas; (penalty scored) Matheus; (penalty scored) Skenderaj

Petros Vouzounerakis Stadium, Ierapetra
Referee: Georgios Tsagarakis (Chania)

26 September 2021
16:00 EEST

PAO Rouf	0–3	Ergotelis
	Report	Voutsas 4'; Sarris 22'; Kostanasios 60'

Rouf Municipal Stadium, Rouf
Referee: Fotis Ntaoulas (West Attica)

26 September 2021
16:00 EEST

AO Nea Artaki	1–2	A.E. Kifisia
Karampas 22'	Report	Doriva 18' (pen.); Tetteh 88'

Nea Artaki Municipal Stadium, Euboea
Referee: Theodoros Poulopoulos (Piraeus)

26 September 2021
16:00 EEST

Giouchtas	1–2 (a.e.t.)	A.O. Agios Nikolaos
Logothetis 26'	Report	Xhilaj 83'; Foukarakis 92'

Archanes National Stadium, Heraklion
Attendance: 400
Referee: Rafail Stavroulakis (Rethymno)

26 September 2021
16:00 EEST

Ilioupoli	2–0	Asteras Vlachioti
Tsatsaris 49'; Tavares 81'	Report

Ilioupoli Municipal Stadium, Ilioupoli

26 September 2021
16:00 EEST

Diagoras Vrachnaiika	0–1	Panachaiki
	Report	Chanti 39'

Vrachnaiika Municipal Stadium, Vrachnaiika
Referee: Eleni Antoniou (East Attica)

26 September 2021
16:00 EEST

Acheron Kanallaki	2–1 (a.e.t.)	Olympiacos Volos
Markopouliotis 45' (o.g.); Papanikou 95'	Report	Stamou 30'

Kanallaki Municipal Stadium, Preveza
Referee: Angelos Bakogiannis (Athens)

26 September 2021
16:00 EEST

Edessaikos	1–3	Kozani
Taousianis 58'	Report	Bakalis 22'; Baro 32'; Tsotsos 60'

Municipal Stadium of Edessa, Edessa
Referee: Mattheos Vournelis (Macedonia)

26 September 2021
16:00 EEST

AE Lefkimmi	2–1 (a.e.t.)	Apollon Pontus
Tsevanedis 100' (pen.), 105'	Report	Sountoura 96'

Lefkimmi Municipal Stadium, Lefkimmi
Referee: Marios Sintoris (Thesprotia)

26 September 2021
16:00 EEST

Poseidon Nea Michaniona	0–5	Levadiakos
	Report	Poletto 11'; Linardos 40'; Nili 44'; Vrakas 55'; Koutsikovangelis 64' (o.g.)

Nea Michaniona Stadium, Michaniona
Referee: Georgios Vreskas (Pieria)

26 September 2021
16:00 EEST

Karaiskakis	0–2	Xanthi
	Report	Ibraimi 15', 41'

Municipal Agioi Anargiroi Stadium, Arta
Referee: Konstantinos Katikos (Athens)

26 September 2021
16:00 EEST

Apollon Larissa	0–3	AEL
	Report	Ogkmpoe 55', 65'; Kushta 90+3'

Filippoupoli Stadium, Larissa
Referee: Fotis Polychronis (Pieria)

26 September 2021
16:00 EEST

Pierikos	1–2	Iraklis
Zafirakis 62'	Report	Kakko 13'; Bastakos 50'

Katerini Stadium, Katerini
Referee: Panagiotis-Rafail Tsiaras (Kavala)

26 September 2021
16:00 EEST

Theseus Agria	2–2 (a.e.t.)	Panserraikos
Fourkiotis 43'; Karatsolis 87'	Report	Correa 68'; Zeris 90+3'
Penalties
Spathis (penalty scored); Alexiou (penalty missed); Karatsolis (penalty scored); Iakovidis (penalty missed)	2–4	(penalty scored) Tsimikas; (penalty scored) Kanis; (penalty scored) Correa; (penalty scored) Marchioni

Agria Municipal Stadium, Agria
Referee: Andromachi Tsiofliki (Larissa)

26 September 2021
16:00 EEST

P.O. Fiki	0–1	Niki Volos
	Report	Rojano 17'

Fiki Municipal Stadium, Trikala
Referee: Dimitris Maloutas (Imathia)

26 September 2021
16:00 EEST

Panagriniakos	0–2	Trikala
	Report	Eleftheriadis 79'; Kouskounas 90+5'

Municipal Stadium of Agios Konstantinos, Agios Konstantinos
Referee: Nikolaos Bailis (Preveza-Lefkada)

26 September 2021
16:00 EEST

Veria	0–1 (a.e.t.)	Anagennisi Karditsa
		Gjini 118'

Veria Stadium, Veria
Referee: Alexandros Katsikogiannis (Epirus)

26 September 2021
16:00 EEST

Ethnikos Sochos	0–1	AO Ypato
		Lima 29'

Sochos Municipal Stadium, Thessaloniki

26 September 2021
16:00 EEST

Thesprotos	1–2	Almopos Aridea
Ramírez 45+2'		Rovas 49'; Souliotis 83'

Municipal Stadium of Igoumenitsa, Igoumenitsa
Referee: Dimitris Theocharis (Thessaly)

26 September 2021
16:00 EEST

Kallithea	2–1 (a.e.t.)	Episkopi
Evangelou 34'; Tsintonis 95'		Demethryus 46'

Grigoris Lambrakis Stadium, Kallithea
Referee: Panagiotis Kaddas (Achaea)

29 September 2021
16:00 EEST

Egaleo	2–1 (a.e.t.)	Chania
Tsiligiris 48'; Hoxhalli 93'		Bajrović 40'

Grigoris Lambrakis Stadium, Kallithea
Referee: Giorgos Lamprou (Euboea)

=== Fourth round ===
The draw took place on 30 September 2021.

==== Summary ====
Team 1	Score	Team 2
6 October 2021
Diagoras	1–2 (a.e.t.)	AEL
AO Ypato	0–1 (a.e.t.)	Trikala
Anagennisi Karditsa	1–1 (2–0 p)	Almopos Aridea
Kozani	1–1 (4–5 p)	A.O. Agios Nikolaos
Levadiakos	2–0	Kalamata
Niki Volos	2–0	Ergotelis
Panachaiki	1–0	Egaleo
Panserraikos	2–1	Iraklis
Proodeftiki	0–2	Xanthi
N/A
Kallithea	bye	
AE Lefkimmi	bye	
Ilioupoli	bye	
A.E. Kifisia	bye	
Acheron Kanallaki	bye	

==== Matches ====
6 October 2021
15:00 EEST

Diagoras	1–2 (a.e.t.)	AEL
Rafinha 78'	Report	Mavrias 40'; Giakos 98' (pen.)

Diagoras Stadium, Rhodes
Referee: Aristidis Vatsios (West Attica)

6 October 2021
16:00 EEST

AO Ypato	0–1 (a.e.t.)	Trikala
	Report	Rizogiannis 115' (pen.)

Thebes Municipal Stadium, Thebes
Referee: Giorgos Alampeis (Athens)

6 October 2021
16:00 EEST

Anagennisi Karditsa	1–1 (a.e.t.)	Almopos Aridea
Athanasiadis 103'	Report	Rovas 94'
Penalties
Athanasiadis (penalty missed); Bianconi (penalty scored); Larrea (penalty scored)	2–0	(penalty missed) Gioukoudis; (penalty missed) Rovas; (penalty missed) Shehu; (penalty missed) Karabelas

Municipal Stadium of Karditsa, Karditsa
Referee: Giorgos Tasis (Epirus)

6 October 2021
16:00 EEST

Kozani	1–1 (a.e.t.)	A.O. Agios Nikolaos
Rongotis 20'	Report	G. Pitharoulis 42'
Penalties
Rongotis (penalty scored); Karagiannis (penalty scored); Baro (penalty scored); Bintsis (penalty missed); Iordanidis (penalty scored); Katsoulidis (penalty missed)	4–5	(penalty scored) Canaj; (penalty scored) G. Pitharoulis; (penalty scored) Plousis; (penalty missed) Katsaros; (penalty scored) Tzilai; (penalty scored) Dolapsakis

Kozani Stadium, Kozani
Referee: Dimitris Takidis (Kilkis)

6 October 2021
16:00 EEST

Levadiakos	2–0	Kalamata
Tsapras 64'; Moutinho 76'	Report

Levadia Municipal Stadium, Levadia
Referee: Alexandros Tsamouris (Piraeus)

6 October 2021
16:00 EEST

Niki Volos	2–0	Ergotelis
Vlachomitros 72'; Andreou 89'	Report

Panthessaliko Stadium, Volos
Referee: Georgios Meltzanidis (Imathia)

6 October 2021
16:00 EEST

Panachaiki	1–0	Egaleo
Kyvelidis 74'	Report

Kostas Davourlis Stadium, Patras
Referee: Alexandros Dragatis (East Attica)

6 October 2021
16:00 EEST

Panserraikos	2–1	Iraklis
Anakoglou 69'; Correa 90+2'	Report	Bastakos 67'

Serres Municipal Stadium, Serres
Referee: Konstantinos Poulikidis (Drama)

6 October 2021
16:00 EEST

Proodeftiki	0–2	Xanthi
	Report	Ibraimi 22'; Joseph-Monrose 84'

Keratsini Municipal Stadium, Keratsini
Referee: Charalampos Tsoukalas (Athens)

=== Fifth round ===
The draw took place on 14 October 2021.

==== Summary ====
Team 1	Score	Team 2
26 October 2021
Levadiakos	1–0	Asteras Tripolis
Anagennisi Karditsa	0–0 (5–4 p)	Kallithea
AEL	1–1 (3–1 p)	PAS Giannina
27 October 2021
AE Lefkimmi	1–2	A.O. Agios Nikolaos
Xanthi	1–2	Ionikos
Ilioupoli	0–3	Lamia
Panserraikos	1–3	Volos
Atromitos	0–1	Panathinaikos
Panachaiki	1–2	Panetolikos
28 October 2021
Acheron Kanallaki	0–1	OFI
Trikala	0–1	Niki Volos
3 November 2021
A.E. Kifisia	1–0	Apollon Smyrnis

==== Matches ====
26 October 2021
15:00 EEST

Levadiakos	1–0	Asteras Tripolis
Nikas 90+7'	Report

Levadia Municipal Stadium, Levadia
Referee: Evaggelos Manouchos (Argolida)

26 October 2021
15:00 EEST

Anagennisi Karditsa	0–0 (a.e.t.)	Kallithea
	Report
Penalties
Lottas (penalty scored); Karanikas (penalty missed); Vidal (penalty missed); Gjini (penalty scored); Golias (penalty scored); Gougoudis (penalty scored); Lagos (penalty scored)	5–4	(penalty scored) Doumtsis; (penalty missed) Santana; (penalty missed) Kontochristos; (penalty scored) Tsintonis; (penalty scored) Evangelou; (penalty scored) Rentzas; (penalty missed) Kostikas

Municipal Stadium of Karditsa, Karditsa
Referee: Dimitris Maloutas (Imathia)

26 October 2021
17:15 EEST

AEL	1–1 (a.e.t.)	PAS Giannina
Mavrias 52' (pen.)	Report	Kargas 62' (pen.)
Penalties
Acuña (penalty scored); Iliadis (penalty scored); Bertos (penalty missed); Colombino (penalty scored)	3–1	(penalty missed) Saliakas; (penalty missed) Kargas; (penalty scored) Peersman; (penalty missed) Pantelakis

Alcazar Stadium, Larissa
Referee: Anastasios Papapetrou (Athens)

27 October 2021
14:00 EEST

AE Lefkimmi	1–2	A.O. Agios Nikolaos
Kostakiotis 36'	Report	Foukarakis 25'; Mavris 77'

Lefkimmi Municipal Stadium, Corfu
Referee: Konstantinos Katoikos (Athens)

27 October 2021
15:00 EEST

Xanthi	1–2	Ionikos
Platellas 26'	Report	Dálcio 76'; Thuram 79'

Xanthi FC Arena, Xanthi
Referee: Aggelos Aggelakis (Macedonia)

27 October 2021
15:00 EEST

Ilioupoli	0–3	Lamia
	Report	Tsoukalos 13', 56'; Mazoulouxis 90+3'

Ilioupoli Municipal Stadium, Ilioupoli
Referee: Petros Tsagarakis (Chania)

27 October 2021
17:15 EEST

Panserraikos	1–3	Volos
Marchioni 14'	Report	Bartolo 6'; Dimitriou 57' (o.g.); Rosero 90+5'

Serres Municipal Stadium, Serres
Referee: Panagiotis Koukoulas (Lesbos)

27 October 2021
19:30 EEST

Atromitos	0–1	Panathinaikos
	Report	Carlitos 39'

Peristeri Stadium, Peristeri
Referee: Angelos Evangelou (Athens)

27 October 2021
21:30 EEST

Panachaiki	1–2	Panetolikos
Papachronopoulos 48'	Report	Karelis 20'; Vergos 74'

Kostas Davourlis Stadium, Patras
Referee: Aristidis Vatsios (West Attica)

28 October 2021
21:30 EEST

Acheron Kanallaki	0–1	OFI
	Report	Castaignos 25' (pen.)

Preveza Municipal Stadium, Preveza
Referee: Athanasios Tzilos (Larissa)

28 October 2021
17:15 EEST

Trikala	0–1	Niki Volos
	Report	Rojano 73' (pen.)

Trikala Municipal Stadium, Trikala
Referee: Georgios Vreskas (Pieria)

3 November 2021
21:30 EET

A.E. Kifisia	1–0	Apollon Smyrnis
Kallergis 90'	Report

Michalis Kritikopoulos Stadium, Kaisariani
Referee: Spyros Zabalas (Epirus)

== Knockout phase ==
Each tie in the knockout phase, apart from the quarter-finals and the semi-finals, was played by a single match. If the score was level at the end of normal time, extra time was played, followed by a penalty shoot-out if the score was still level. In the quarter-finals and the semi-finals were played over two legs, with each team playing one leg at home. The team that scored more goals on aggregate over the two legs advanced to the next round. If the aggregate score was level, the away goals rule was applied, i.e. the team that scored more goals away from home over the two legs advanced. If away goals were also equal, then extra time was played. The away goals rule was again applied after extra time, i.e. if there were goals scored during extra time and the aggregate score was still level, the visiting team advanced by virtue of more away goals scored. If no goals were scored during extra time, the winners were decided by a penalty shoot-out. In the round of 16, if the score was level at the end of normal time the two-legged rule was applied.
The mechanism of the draws for each round is as follows:

- In the draw for the Round of 16, the four Super League clubs finishing in places 1–4 in the previous season are seeded, while the clubs advancing from the Fifth Round are unseeded.
  The seeded teams are drawn against the unseeded teams, with the seeded teams hosting the second leg. The remaining 8 unseeded clubs will be drawn against one another with the team being drawn last hosting the second leg.
- In the draws for the quarter-finals onwards, there are no seedings and teams from the same group can be drawn against each other.

== Bracket ==
Round of 16
1	Panathinaikos	2	0	2
16	Volos	1	0	1
8	A.O. Agios Nikolaos	0	0	0
9	Anagennisi Karditsa	1	5	6
5	Aris	3	2	5
12	OFI	1	0	1
4	Lamia	2	1	3
13	Ionikos	0	0	0
6	AEL	1	1	2
11	PAOK	1	3	4
3	AEK Athens	4	1	5
14	A.E. Kifisia	0	1	1
7	Niki Volos	0	0	0
10	Panetolikos	1	1	2
2	Levadiakos	3	0	3
15	Olympiacos	2	2	4

Quarter-finals
Panathinaikos	4	1	5
Anagennisi Karditsa	0	0	0
Aris	0	0	0
Lamia (a.e.t.)	0	1	1
PAOK	0	2	2
AEK Athens	0	1	1
Panetolikos	2	1	3
Olympiacos (a.e.t.)	1	3	4

Semi-finals
Panathinaikos	1	2	3
Lamia	0	0	0
PAOK (a.e.t.) (a)	0	1	1
Olympiacos	0	1	1

Final
Panathinaikos	1
PAOK	0

== Round of 16 ==
The draw took place on 18 November 2021. The first legs were played on 1 December 2021 and the second legs were played on 22 and 23 December 2021.

=== Summary ===
Team 1	Agg.	Team 2	1st leg	2nd leg
AEL	2–4	PAOK	1–1	1–3
Aris	5–1	OFI	3–1	2–0
AEK Athens	5–1	A.E. Kifisia	4–0	1–1
Levadiakos	3–4	Olympiacos	3–2	0–2
Panathinaikos	2–1	Volos	2–1	0–0
A.O. Agios Nikolaos	0–6	Anagennisi Karditsa	0–1	0–5
Lamia	3–0	Ionikos	2–0	1–0
Niki Volos	0–2	Panetolikos	0–1	0–1

=== Matches ===
1 December 2021
21:30 EET

AEL	1–1	PAOK
Tahar 64'	Report	Kurtić 90+5'

Alcazar Stadium, Larissa
Referee: Evaggelos Manouchos (Argolida)
22 December 2021
17:00 EET

PAOK	3–1	AEL
Gotzamanidis 23' (o.g.); Akpom 82', 90+1'	Report	Ogboe 62'

Toumba Stadium, Thessaloniki
Attendance: Behind closed doors
Referee: Angelos Evangelou (Athens)

PAOK won 4–2 on aggregate.

1 December 2021
17:00 EET

Aris	3–1	OFI
Gama 16' (pen.); Kamara 45+4' (pen.); Iturbe 90'	Report	Castaignos 56'

Kleanthis Vikelidis Stadium, Thessaloniki
Referee: Vasilis Fotias (Pella)
22 December 2021
15:00 EET

OFI	0–2	Aris
	Report	Gama 49' (pen.); Kamara 81'

Theodoros Vardinogiannis Stadium, Heraklion
Referee: Alexandros Tsakalidis (Chalkidiki)

Aris won 5–1 on aggregate.

1 December 2021
20:15 EET

AEK Athens	4–0	A.E. Kifisia
Ansarifard 52'; Svarnas 57'; Tanković 71'; Hajsafi 74'	Report

Olympic Stadium, Marousi
Attendance: 1,507
Referee: Aristidis Vatsios (West Attica)
23 December 2021
19:00 EET

A.E. Kifisia	1–1	AEK Athens
Tetteh 73'	Report	García 55'

Michalis Kritikopoulos Stadium, Kaisariani
Referee: Anastasios Sidiropoulos (Dodecanese)

AEK Athens won 5–1 on aggregate.

1 December 2021
17:00 EET

Levadiakos	3–2	Olympiacos
Poletto 3'; Panagiotou 6'; Doumtsios 61'	Report	Semedo 26'; Lopes 63'

Levadia Municipal Stadium, Livadeia
Referee: Alexandros Tsakalidis (Chalkidiki)
22 December 2021
19:00 EET

Olympiacos	2–0	Levadiakos
Tiquinho 25', 43'	Report

Karaiskakis Stadium, Piraeus
Referee: Aristomenis Koutsiaftis (Arta)

Olympiacos won 4–3 on aggregate.

1 December 2021
19:00 EET

Panathinaikos	2–1	Volos
Macheda 24'; Alexandropoulos 51'	Report	Fernandes 56'

Leoforos Alexandras Stadium, Ampelokipoi
Referee: Ioannis Papadopoulos (Macedonia)
23 December 2021
17:00 EET

Volos	0–0	Panathinaikos
	Report

Panthessaliko Stadium, Volos
Referee: Evaggelos Manouchos (Argolida)

Panathinaikos won 2–1 on aggregate.

2 December 2021
15:00 EET

A.O. Agios Nikolaos	0–1	Anagennisi Karditsa
	Report	Manios 90+1'

Agios Nikolaos Municipal Stadium, Agios Nikolaos
Referee: Aggelos Aggelakis (Macedonia)
22 December 2021
15:00 EET

Anagennisi Karditsa	5–0	A.O. Agios Nikolaos
Politis 18' (pen.); Athanasiadis 54'; Plegas 62', 70'; Kotsonis 68'	Report

Municipal Stadium of Karditsa, Karditsa
Referee: Spyros Zabalas (Epirus)

Anagennisi Karditsa won 6–0 on aggregate.

2 December 2021
17:00 EET

Lamia	2–0	Ionikos
Tsoukalos 24'; Romanić 53'	Report

Lamia Municipal Stadium, Lamia
Referee: Spyros Zabalas (Epirus)
23 December 2021
17:00 EET

Ionikos	0–1	Lamia
	Report	Eleftheriadis 38' (pen.)

Neapoli Stadium, Nikaia
Referee: Ioannis Papadopoulos (Macedonia)

Lamia won 3–0 on aggregate.

1 December 2021
15:00 EET

Niki Volos	0–1	Panetolikos
	Report	Duarte 24'

Panthessaliko Stadium, Volos
Referee: Giorgos Tzovaras (Phthiotis)
22 December 2021
17:00 EET

Panetolikos	1–0	Niki Volos
Vergos 90+4'	Report

Panetolikos Stadium, Agrinio
Referee: Efstathios Gortsilas (Macedonia)

Panetolikos won 2–0 on aggregate.

== Quarter-finals ==
The draw took place on 29 December 2021. Former Greek international and member of the UEFA Euro 2004 squad, Kostas Katsouranis, made the draw using a manually operated lottery ball cage.

=== Summary ===
Team 1	Agg.	Team 2	1st leg	2nd leg
Aris	0–1	Lamia	0–0	0–1 (a.e.t.)
Panetolikos	3–4	Olympiacos	2–1	1–3 (a.e.t.)
Panathinaikos	5–0	Anagennisi Karditsa	4–0	1–0
PAOK	2–1	AEK Athens	0–0	2–1

=== Matches ===
20 January 2022
17:00 EET

Aris	0–0	Lamia
	Report

Kleanthis Vikelidis Stadium, Thessaloniki
Referee: Konstantinos Perrakis (Athens)
26 January 2022
20:00 EET

Lamia	1–0 (a.e.t.)	Aris
Tzanetopoulos 118'	Report

Lamia Municipal Stadium, Lamia
Referee: Dimitrios Karantonis (Imathia)

Lamia won 1–0 on aggregate.

19 January 2022
15:00 EET

Panetolikos	2–1	Olympiacos
Mendoza 23'; Karelis 60'	Report	El-Arabi 13'

Panetolikos Stadium, Agrinio
Referee: Aristomenis Koutsiaftis (Arta)
9 February 2022
18:00 EET

Olympiacos	3–1 (a.e.t.)	Panetolikos
Fadiga 6'; Masouras 90+2', 115'	Report	Karelis 85'

Karaiskakis Stadium, Piraeus
Attendance: Behind closed doors
Referee: Efstathios Gortsilas (Macedonia)

Olympiacos won 4–3 on aggregate.

19 January 2022
19:00 EET

Panathinaikos	4–0	Anagennisi Karditsa
Vital 6', 20'; Aitor 32'; Carlitos 42'	Report

Leoforos Alexandras Stadium, Ampelokipoi
Referee: Anastasios Papapetrou (Athens)
9 February 2022
16:00 EET

Anagennisi Karditsa	0–1	Panathinaikos
	Report	Palacios 42'

Municipal Stadium of Karditsa, Karditsa
Referee: Anastasios Sidiropoulos (Dodecanese)

Panathinaikos won 5–0 on aggregate.

19 January 2022
19:00 EET

PAOK	0–0	AEK Athens
	Report

Toumba Stadium, Thessaloniki
Attendance: Behind closed doors
Referee: István Vad (Hungary)
9 February 2022
20:00 EET

AEK Athens	1–2	PAOK
Simões 83'	Report	Kurtić 90+5'; Mitriță 90+7'

Olympic Stadium, Marousi
Attendance: 1,000
Referee: Andreas Ekberg (Sweden)

PAOK won 2–1 on aggregate.

== Semi-finals ==
The draw took place on 29 December 2021, after the quarter-final draw.

=== Summary ===
Team 1	Agg.	Team 2	1st leg	2nd leg
Panathinaikos	3–0	Lamia	1–0	2–0
PAOK	(a) 1–1	Olympiacos	0–0	1–1 (a.e.t.)

=== Matches ===
20 April 2022
19:00 EEST

Panathinaikos	1–0	Lamia
Ioannidis 19'

Leoforos Alexandras Stadium, Ampelokipoi
Referee: Anastasios Sidiropoulos (Dodecanese)
27 April 2022
18:00 EEST

Lamia	0–2	Panathinaikos
		Ioannidis 42'; Palacios 58'

Lamia Municipal Stadium, Lamia
Referee: Bobby Madden (Scotland)

Panathinaikos won 3–0 on aggregate

21 April 2022
19:30 EEST

PAOK	0–0	Olympiacos

Toumba Stadium, Thessaloniki
Referee: Daniele Chiffi (Italy)
27 April 2022
20:00 EEST

Olympiacos	1–1 (a.e.t.)	PAOK
El-Arabi 105' (pen.)		Čolak 108'

Karaiskakis Stadium, Piraeus
Referee: Valentín Pizarro Gómez (Spain)

1–1 on aggregate; PAOK won on away goals

== Final ==
21 May 2022
20:00 EEST

Panathinaikos	1–0	PAOK
Aitor 34' (pen.)	Report

Olympic Stadium, Marousi
Attendance: 45,409
Referee: Antonio Mateu Lahoz (Spain)

== Top scorers ==
Rank	Player	Club	Goals
1	(Greece) Vangelis Tsevanedis	AE Lefkimmi	6
2	(Greece) Charalampos Samios	Ethnikos Piraeus	4
2	(Greece) Ilias Ignatidis	Poseidon Nea Michaniona	4
4	(Albania) Alberto Simoni	Tilikratis	3
4	(Greece) Georgios Mouliatos	Diavolitsi	3
4	(North Macedonia) Besart Ibraimi	Xanthi	3
4	(Greece) Nikolaos Spiliotis	AO Ypato	3
4	(Greece) Marios Ogkmpoe	AEL	3
4	(Greece) Nikos Karelis	Panetolikos	3
4	(Portugal) Fábio Tavares	Ilioupoli	3
4	(Greece) Georgios Mavris	A.O. Agios Nikolaos	3
