= 2021–22 Veria NFC season =

Veria
- President: Christos Bikas
- Manager: Pavlos Dermitzakis
- Stadium: Veria Municipal Stadium
- Super League 2: 1st, North
- Play-offs: Runner up
- Play-out: Runner up
- Greek Cup: Third round
- Top goalscorer: League: Giannis Pasas (25); All: Giannis Pasas (25)
- Highest home attendance: 4,700 (vs Levadiakos
- Biggest win: Veria 5–0 Apollon Pontus
- Biggest defeat: Anagennisi Karditsa 5–2 Veria
Home colours	Away colours	Third colours

The 2021–22 season is Veria's 3rd season in existence and first in the second tier of the Greek football league system, and first after the foundation of the Super League 2. The contents of this article cover club activities from 1 July 2021 until 30 May 2022.

== Players ==
As of 9 February 2022

Note: Flags indicate national team as defined under FIFA eligibility rules; some limited exceptions apply. Players may hold more than one non-FIFA nationality.

No.	Pos.	Nation	Player
1	GK	GRE	Markos Vellidis
2	DF	GRE	Michalis Boukouvalas
3	DF	GRE	Stavros Petavrakis
5	DF	GRE	Stelios Marangos
6	MF	GRE	Angelos Ikonomou
7	MF	GRE	Georgios Bletsas
8	MF	GRE	Vasilios Gavriilidis
9	FW	GRE	Petros Giakoumakis
10	FW	GRE	Stelios Pozoglou
11	FW	GHA	Ishmael Baidoo
12	DF	GRE	Anastasios Tasiopoulos
17	FW	CIV	Manssou Fofana
19	FW	GRE	Giannis Pasas
20	FW	GRE	Petros Orfanidis

No.	Pos.	Nation	Player
21	DF	GRE	Manolis Perdikis
22	FW	GRE	Savvas Mourgos
23	MF	GRE	Konstantinos Isaakidis
26	DF	GRE	Asterios Mouchalis
27	FW	GRE	Giannis Mystakidis
28	MF	ALB	Ergys Kaçe
33	DF	GRE	Stergios Dimopoulos
34	MF	MKD	Ali Adem (on loan from Aris)
37	GK	GRE	Vasilis Tsimopoulos
44	DF	GRE	Apostolos Skondras
87	GK	GRE	Giannis Papadopoulous
93	DF	GRE	Anastasios Papachristos
97	FW	BEL	Charles Kwateng (on loan from Ergotelis)
99	FW	GRE	Antonis Kapnidis

== Personnel ==
=== Management ===
Position	Name
Ownership	Bikas Group
President	(Greece) Christos Bikas
Vice President & CEO	(Greece) Achilleas Bikas
Member of the Board	(Greece) Konstantinos Bikas
Member of the Board	(Greece) Dimitrios Ntellas
Member of the Board	(Greece) Apostolos Ntellas
Communication & Press Officer	(Greece) Zisis X. Patsikas

=== Coaching staff ===
Coaching staff
(Greece) Pavlos Dermitzakis	Head Coach
(Greece) Alexandros Vergonis	Assistant Coach
(Greece) Giannis Mantziaridis	Coach
(Greece) Christos Vorgiazidis	Fitness Coach
(Greece) Theodoros Gitkos	Goalkeeping Coach
(Greece) Anastasios Pantelidis	Physiotherapist
(Greece) Fotis Konstantakos	Physiotherapist
(Greece) Sakis Voulgaris	Caretaker
(Greece) Kosmas Rouzintsis	Caretaker
Sport management and organisation
(Greece) Panagiotis Tsalouchidis	General Director
(Greece) Thomas Troupkos	Team Manager

Source: Veria NFC

== Transfers ==
=== In ===
No	Pos	Player	Transferred from	Fee	Date	Source
—	CB	Stergios Dimopoulos	Free	-	24 July 2021	
—	CM	Vasilios Gavriilidis	Free	-	28 July 2021	
—	CM / AM	Petros Orfanidis	Free	-	2 August 2021	
—	CB	Manolis Perdikis	Free	-	10 August 2021	
—	GK	Giannis Papadopoulos	Free	-	11 August 2021	
—	CB	Anastasios Tasiopoulos	Veria U19	-	20 August 2021	
—	CM	Kostas Isaakidis	Free	-	20 August 2021	
—	RW	Giannis Mystakidis	Free	-	22 August 2021	
—	RW	Ishmael Baidoo	Free	-	25 August 2021	
—	RW	Thanasis Dinas	Free	-	26 August 2021	
—	DM	Lucas Ramos	Free	-	27 August 2021	
—	LW	Manssour Fofana	Free	-	28 August 2021	
—	FW	Petros Giakoumakis	Free	-	16 September 2021	
—	RW	Charles Kwateng	on loan from Ergotelis	-	8 January 2022	
—	FW	Antonis Kapnidis	Free	-	9 January 2022	
—	CM	Ali Adem	on loan from Aris	-	11 January 2022	
—	CM	Ergys Kaçe	Free	-	9 February 2022	

=== Out ===
No	Pos	Player	Transferred to	Fee	Date	Source
—	CM	Alexandros Vergonis	Retired	-	30 June 2021	
—	GK	Panagiotis Vosniadis	Free	-	23 July 2021	
—	CM	Alexandros Karagiannis	Free	-	23 July 2021	
—	CM	Di Giovanni Nouma Oum	Free	-	23 July 2021	
—	LW	Alberto Simoni	Tilikratis	-	23 July 2021	
—	RW	Konstantinos Apostolopoulos	Aiolikos	-	23 July 2021	
—	CB	Dimitris Stamou	Free	-	23 July 2021	
—	FW	Giannis Loukinas	Kalamata	Free	27 July 2021	
—	FW	Giorgos Vasiltsis	Megas Alexandros Trikala	Loan	17 August 2021	
—	CM	Antonis Pertsiounis	Megas Alexandros Trikala	Loan	31 August 2021	
—	DM	Lucas Ramos	Free	-	29 January 2022	
—	RW	Thanasis Dinas	Free	-	29 January 2022	

== Pre-season and friendlies ==
Win Draw Loss Upcoming fixture

28 August 2021 Friendly	Doxa Drama	3 – 3	Veria	Drama
19:00		https://www.kerkidasport.gr/podosfairo/veroia/22017-filiki-isopalia-gia-ti-veroia-sti-drama (in Greek)		Stadium: Doxa Drama Stadium

1 September 2021 Friendly	Apollon Paralimnio	1 – 2	Veria	Drama
18:00		https://www.kerkidasport.gr/podosfairo/veroia/22062-veroia-filiki-niki-epi-tou-apollona-paralimniou (in Greek)		Stadium: Paralimnio Ground

4 September 2021 Friendly	Veria	0 – 1	PAOK	Veria
18:00		https://www.kerkidasport.gr/podosfairo/veroia/22089-koitakse-sta-matia-ton-paok-i-veroia-filiki-itta-me-1-0-video (in Greek)		Stadium: Veria Stadium

10 September 2021 Friendly	Veria	0 – 1	Iraklis	Veria
18:00		https://www.kerkidasport.gr/podosfairo/veroia/22145-filiki-itta-apo-ton-irakli-gia-tin-kourasmeni-veroia (in Greek)		Stadium: Veria Stadium

15 September 2021 Friendly	Makedonikos	0 – 1	Veria	Thessaloniki
18:00		https://www.kerkidasport.gr/podosfairo/veroia/22193-filiki-niki-tis-veroias-stin-efkarpia-epi-tou-makedonikoy (in Greek)		Stadium: Makedonikos Stadium

== Competitions ==
=== League table ===
Pos	Team	Pld	W	D	L	GF	GA	GD	Pts	Promotion, qualification or relegation (Note: Olympiacos B and PAOK B are ineligible for promotion and relegation)
1	Veria (Q)	32	23	6	3	61	23	+38	75	Qualification for the Title and Promotion play-offs
2	AEL	32	19	10	3	42	15	+27	67	
3	Xanthi (Note: Xanthi was relegated to local championships because of financial problems.) (R)	32	13	14	5	43	25	+18	53	Relegation to Local Championships
4	Niki Volos	32	14	10	8	38	20	+18	52	
5	Anagennisi Karditsa	32	15	6	11	47	34	+13	51	

Source: sl2.gr
Rules for classification: 1) Points; 2) Head-to-head points; 3) Head-to-head goal difference; 4) Goals scored; 5) Goals against; 6) Play-offs (neutral ground, only used if needed to decide teams for promotion or relegation).
(Q) Qualified for the phase indicated; (R) Relegated

==== Results summary ====
Overall								Home						Away					
Pld	W	D	L	GF	GA	GD	Pts	W	D	L	GF	GA	GD	W	D	L	GF	GA	GD
32	23	6	3	61	23	+38	75	14	2	0	36	7	+29	9	4	3	25	16	+9

Last updated: 2 May 2022.
Source: Super League 2 Greece

==== Regular season matches ====
Win Draw Loss Postponed

7 November 2021 1	Veria	1–0	Almopos Aridea	Veria
15:00 EET				Stadium: Veria Stadium

13 November 2021 2	Niki Volos	2–2	Veria	Volos
15:00 EET				Stadium: Panthessaliko Stadium

21 November 2021 3	Veria	3–0	Olympiacos Volos	Veria
15:00 EET				Stadium: Veria Stadium

24 November 2021 4	PAOK B	1–2	Veria	Thessaloniki
14:45 EET				Stadium: Makedonikos Stadium

28 November 2021 5	Veria	1–0	Trikala	Veria
14:45 EET				Stadium: Veria Stadium

5 December 2021 6	AEL	1–1	Veria	Larisa
14:45 EET				Stadium: Alkazar Stadium

11 December 2021 7	Veria	5–1	Apollon Larissa	Veria
14:45 EET				Stadium: Veria Stadium

15 December 2021 8	Olympiacos B	1–1	Veria	Athens
15:00 EET				Stadium: Tavros Stadium

18 December 2021 9	Veria	3–0	Panserraikos	Veria
14:45 EET				Stadium: Veria Stadium

29 December 2021 10	POT Iraklis	1–0	Veria	Thessaloniki
15:00 EET				Stadium: Kaftanzoglio Stadium

26 January 2022 12	Veria	5–0	Apollon Pontus	Veria
14:45 EET				Stadium: Veria Stadium

2 March 2022 13	Anagennisi Karditsa	5–2	Veria	Karditsa
14:45 EET				Stadium: Municipal Stadium of Karditsa

26 January 2022 14	Veria	3–1	Pierikos	Veria
14:45 EET				Stadium: Veria Stadium

22 January 2022 15	Xanthi	0–3	Veria	Pigadia
17:00 EET				Stadium: Xanthi FC Arena

30 January 2022 16	Veria	2–1	Thesprotos	Veria
14:45 EET				Stadium: Veria Stadium

6 February 2022 17	Kavala	0–2	Veria	Kavala
17:00 EET				Stadium: Anthi Karagianni Stadium

12 February 2022 18	Almopos Aridea	1–2	Veria	Aridea
14:45 EET				Stadium: Aridea Municipal Stadium

16 February 2022 19	Veria	1–0	Niki Volos	Veria
14:45 EET				Stadium: Veria Stadium

16 March 2022 20	Olympiacos Volos	0–2	Veria	Volos
15:00 EET				Stadium: Neapoli Municipal Stadium

26 February 2022 21	Veria	2–1	PAOK B	Veria
17:00 EET				Stadium: Veria Stadium

6 March 2022 22	Trikala	1–2	Veria	Trikala
15:00 EET				Stadium: Trikala Municipal Stadium

9 March 2022 23	Veria	1–1	AEL	Veria
15:30 EET				Stadium: Veria Stadium

13 March 2022 24	Apollon Larissa	0–1	Veria	Larissa
14:45 EET				Stadium: AEL FC Arena

19 March 2022 25	Veria	1–0	Olympiacos B	Veria
14:45 EET				Stadium: Veria Stadium

27 March 2022 26	Panserraikos	0–1	Veria	Serres
17:00 EET				Stadium: Serres Municipal Stadium

30 March 2022 27	Veria	3–1	Iraklis	Veria
15:00 EEST				Stadium: Veria Stadium

6 April 2022 29	Apollon Pontus	0–0	Veria	Thessaloniki
15:00 EEST				Stadium: Kalamaria Stadium

10 April 2022 30	Veria	2–0	Anagennisi Karditsa	Veria
15:00 EEST				Stadium: Veria Stadium

13 April 2022 31	Pierikos	2–1	Veria	Katerini
15:00 EEST				Stadium: Katerini Municipal Stadium

17 April 2022 32	Veria	0–0	Xanthi	Veria
14:45 EEST				Stadium: Veria Stadium

27 April 2022 33	Thesprotos	1–3	Veria	Igoumenitsa
15:00 EEST				Stadium: Municipal Stadium of Igoumenitsa

1 May 2022 34	Veria	2–1	Kavala	Veria
15:00 EEST				Stadium: Veria Stadium

==== Play-off round matches ====
8 May 2022 First leg	Veria	0–1	Levadiakos	Veria
16:30 EEST				Stadium: Veria Stadium; Attendance: 4500

15 May 2022 Second leg	Levadiakos	1–0 (2–0 agg.)	Veria	Livadeia
16:30 EEST				Stadium: Levadia Municipal Stadium

==== Play-out round matches ====
11 June 2022 First leg	Veria	1–2	Lamia	Veria
20:00 EEST				Stadium: Veria Stadium

18 June 2022 Second leg	Lamia	1–1 (3–2 agg.)	Veria	Lamia
20:00 EEST				Stadium: Lamia Municipal Stadium

=== Greek Football Cup ===
Win Draw Loss

==== Third round ====
26 September 2021 Third round	Veria	0–1 (a.e.t.)	Anagennisi Karditsa	Veria
15:00 EEST				Stadium: Veria Stadium
