= Kritikos (surname) =

Kritikos is a Greek surname. Notable people with the surname include:

- Anastasios Kritikos (1914–?), Greek footballer
- Anastasios Kritikos (born 1995), Greek footballer
- Giorgos Kritikos (born 1992), Greek footballer
- Konstantinos Kritikos (born 1991), Greek footballer
- Nikos Kritikos (born 1994), Greek footballer
- Stelios Kritikos (born 1986), Greek footballer
