= Fabio Tavares =

Fabio Tavares may refer to:

- Fabinho (footballer, born 1993) (Fábio Henrique Tavares), Brazilian footballer
- Fábio Tavares (footballer, born 1988), Portuguese former football forward
- Fábio Tavares (footballer, born 2001), Portuguese football forward for Rotherham United F.C.
