= Milios =

Milios is the name of:

- John Milios (born 1952), Greek political economist
- Nikos Milios (born 1995), Greek footballer
- Spyros Milios (1800–1880), Greek revolutionary
- Zachos Milios (1805–1860), Greek revolutionary

== See also ==
- Nancy Milio
- Milio's Sandwiches
