= Dimitrios Garas =

Greek footballer

Personal information
- Full name: Dimitrios Garas
- Date of birth: 23 March 2001 (age 25)
- Place of birth: Veria, Greece
- Height: 1.92 m (6 ft 4 in)
- Position: Goalkeeper

Team information
- Current team: Veria
- Number: 1

Youth career
- 2015-2017: A.E. Sxoina
- 2017–2019: Xanthi

Senior career*
Years	Team	Apps	(Gls)
2019	Ialysos	2	(0)
2019–2020	AO Anatoli	28	(0)
2020–2022	Trikala	4	(0)
2022	Pierikos	8	(0)
2023	Zakynthos	12	(0)
2023	A.O. Chaniotis	19	(0)
2024	Apollon Paralimnio	14	(0)
2024–2025	A.E. Alexandreia	17	(0)
2025–	Veria	25	(0)
- * Club domestic league appearances and goals as of 27 September 2026

Dimitrios Gkaras (Greek: Δημήτριος Γκάρας) is a Greek professional footballer who plays as a goalkeeper for Gamma Ethniki club Veria. He was born in Veria and grew up in Alexandreia, Imathia . Also, he studies Philosophy, in University of Ioannina. Before starting his senior career as a footballer, he was a Handball player too.
