= Zoran Stoinović =

Serbian footballer

Personal information
- Full name: Zoran Stoinović
- Date of birth: 26 July 1975 (age 51)
- Place of birth: SFR Yugoslavia
- Height: 1.76 m (5 ft 9 1/2 in)
- Position: Midfielder

Team information
- Current team: Kavala (manager)

Youth career
- Zemun

Senior career*
Years	Team	Apps	(Gls)
1993–1995	Iraklis Ptolemaidas	44	(3)
1995–1997	Trikala	67	(14)
1998	Aris Thessaloniki	15	(1)
1999	Panetolikos	30	(1)
2000	Trikala	21	(1)
2001–2002	Patraikos	24	(5)
2002–2003	Panachaiki	12	(0)
2003–2004	OFK Beograd		
2004–2005	Levadiakos	12	(1)
2005–2007	Panthrakikos		
2007–2008	PAE Thraki		

Managerial career
- 2010: Panthrakikos
- 2016: Panthrakikos
- 2024–2025: Panthrakikos
- 2025–2026: Apollon Kalamarias
- 2026–: Kavala
- * Club domestic league appearances and goals

Zoran Stoinović (born 26 July 1975) is a Serbian retired football player.

Stoinović spent most of his professional career in Greece, appearing in just 31 Alpha Ethniki matches for Aris Thessaloniki, Trikala and Panachaiki. He played in the Beta Ethniki and Gamma Ethniki for several clubs, including Iraklis Ptolemaidas, Panetolikos and Patraikos. He also had a spell with OFK Beograd in the First League of Serbia and Montenegro. His son is Athanasios Stojnović.
