= Imathia Football Clubs Association =

Association football governing body in Imathia Prefecture, Greece

- Full name: Imathia Football Clubs Association; Greek: Ένωση Ποδοσφαιρικών Σωματείων Ημαθίας
- Short name: Imathia F.C.A.; Greek: Ε.Π.Σ. Ημαθίας
- Founded: 1954; 72 years ago
- Headquarters: Veria, Greece
- FIFA affiliation: Hellenic Football Federation
- President: Stergios Mourtzilas
- Website: eps-imathias.gr

Imathia Football Clubs Association (Greek: Ένωση Ποδοσφαιρικών Σωματείων Ημαθίας) is the organization that is responsible for football in the prefecture of Imathia in Greece. Its offices are housed in Veria and it is a member of the HFF. It is responsible for running the local league and cup, as well as the youth and children's divisions. It also coordinates the activities of the mixed youth and children's groups, which represent the county at national level.

== History ==
The group was founded in 1954 as the Central-Western Macedonia Football Clubs Association, and included clubs from the counties of Imathia, Pella and Pieria. It was based in Veria.

The first board of directors of the association consisted of the president, Delidimitriou Antonios, the vice-president, Mitsios Christos, the general secretary, Georgios Lelekakis, and the councilors Theodoros Kazantzidis, Klonos Xenofontas, Simeon Gotouhidis, and Athanassios Kouzas.

In 1971, the clubs of Pella seceded from the association, forming the Pella Football Clubs Association. In 1980, the unions of Pieria also seceded, and created the Pieria Football Clubs Association. Therefore, the association changed its name to Central Macedonia Football Clubs Association and in 1995 it took the name Imathia Football Clubs Association.

E.P.S. Imathias organizes the championships, divided into three categories: first division, second division and third division. It also oversees the cup in which teams from the national divisions participate. Until the 2006–07 season, there were divisions A, B, and C.

== League ==
=== Organization ===
The structure of the leagues of the Imathia FCA for the 2025–26 season were as follows:

- First Division: 12 teams
- Second Division: 12 teams
- Third Division: 6 teams

=== Champions ===
Central-Western Macedonia Football Clubs Association
Season	First division	Second division	Third division	Fourth division
1954–55	Megas Alexandros Katerini			
1955–56				
1956–57	Olympos Katerini			
1957–58	Vermio Veria	Aris Edessa; Makedonikos Giannitsa	**Nea Genea Nea Nikomideia**; Iraklis Krya Vrysi	
1958–59	Megas Alexandros Katerini			
1959–60	Olympos Katerini			
1960–61	Megas Alexandros Katerini			
1961–62	Pierikos		Thyella Stavros	
1962–63	Naoussa			
1963–64	Anagennisi Giannitsa			
1964–65	A.M.S. Alexandreia			
1965–66	Apollon Krya Vrysi			
1966–67	Megas Alexandros Veria			
1967–68	Apollon Krya Vrysi			
1968–69	Naoussa			
1969–70	Apollon Krya Vrysi			
1970–71	Naoussa			
1971–72	Almopos Aridea	Atromitos Diavato		
1972–73	A.M.S. Alexandreia			
1973–74	A.M.S. Alexandreia			
1974–75	A.M.S. Alexandreia			
1975–76	Aiginiakos			
1976–77	Philippos Meliki			
1977–78	Doxa Makrochori			
1978–79	Atromitos Diavato			
1979–80	A.M.S. Alexandreia		Thyella Stavros	
Central Macedonia Football Clubs Association
1980–81	Doxa Makrochori			
1981–82	Agrotikos Asteras Plateos			
1982–83	Nea Genea Nea Nikomideia			
1983–84	Megas Alexandros Alexandreia			
1984–85	Achilleas Naousa			
1985–86	Agrotikos Asteras Plateos			
1986–87	Pontioi Veria			
1987–88	Nisaikos Nisio			
1988–89	Doxa Makrochori		Thyella Stavros	
1989–90	Achilleas Naousa			
1990–91	A.E. Chariessas			
1991–92	Niki Angathia	Agrotikos Asteras Plateos; Thyella Stavros	A.E. Kavasila; Lefkadia	
1992–93	Philippos Meliki			
1993–94	A.M.S. Alexandreia			
1994–95	Niki Angathia	Ethnikos Kleidi; Thyekka Stenimachos	A.E. Kapsochora; Aspida Angelochori	
Imathia Football Clubs Association
1995–96	Doxa Makrochori			
1996–97	Philippos Meliki	A.E. Kapsochora; PAOK Alexandria		
1997–98	Megas Alexandros Trikala			
1998–99	Pontioi Veria			
1999–00	A.E. Alexandreia			
2000–01	A.E. Alexandreia			
2001–02	Pontioi Veria			
2002–03	Naoussa			
2003–04	Veria Academy			
2004–05	Achilleas Neokastro			
2005–06	Ethnikos Kleidi			
2006–07	Pontioi Veria			
2007–08	Niki Angathia			
2008–09	Naoussa			
2009–10	Lefkadia	Thyella Stavros		
2010–11	PAOK Alexandreia			
2011–12	Apostolos Pavlos Union			
2012–13	Achilleas Neokastro	Aris Palaio Skylitsi; Nea Genea Nea Nikomideia	A.E. Kampochori	Arachos Pontian Youth; Apostolos Pavlos Academy
2013–14	PAOK Alexandreia	Agrotikos Asteras Agia Varvara; A.S. Irinoupoli	Doxa Lianovergi	A.E. Schinas
2014–15	A.S. Irinoupoli	AE Alexandreia; Keravnos Episkopis Naousa	M.A.S. Vergina	Megas Alexandros Agia Marina
2015–16	Naoussa	Doxa Lianovergi; Apollon Agios Georgios	Aristotelis Naousa	**Agrotikos Asteras Plateos**; Ermis Trilofos; A.S. Giannakochori
2016–17	Megas Alexandros Trikala	Niki Angathia; Nea Genea Nea Nikomideia	Olympiacos Loutro	Lefkadia
2017–18	Niki Angathia	Philippos Meliki; A.O. Marina	Lefkadia	Asteras Tripotamos
2018–19	Megas Alexandros Trikala	PAO Kouloura; Pontioi Veria	Doxa Kypseli; Achthos Arouri	
2019–20	PAOK Alexandreia	A.E. Schinas; Achthos Arouri; A.O. Marina; Atromitos Diavato	Apollon Lykogianni; Doxa Vrysaki; AE Alexandreia; Doxa Asomata; A.E. Kavasila; Ermis Trilofos	
2020–21	Not finished			
2021–22	Asteras Tripotamos	AE Alexandreia; Apollon Agios Georgios	M.A.S. Vergina	
2022–23	Megas Alexandros Agia Marina	A.E. Kavasila; Keravnos Episkopi; Atlas Zervochori; Patrida	Atromitos Diavato; Veria Academy	
2023–24	A.E. Alexandreia	A.E. Kapsochora; Atromitos Diavato; Thyella Stavros	A.P.S. Rizomata; A.S. Apollon Nea Lykogiani; APS Meliki	
2024–25	Veria	Olympiakos Naoussa	Kentavros Loutro	
2025–26	Naoussa	Kentavros Loutro	Ethnikos Kleidi	

- Source: eps-imathias.gr
- **Bold** indicates the champion of the division after play-offs.

=== Performance by club ===
Club	Titles	Season
A.E. Alexandreia	9	1965, 1973, 1974, 1975, 1980, 1994, 2000, 2001, 2024
Naoussa	7	1963, 1969, 1971, 2003, 2009, 2016, 2026
Doxa Makrochori	4	1978, 1981, 1989, 1996
Pontioi Veria	4	1987, 1999, 2002, 2007
Niki Agathia	4	1992, 1995, 2008, 2018
Megas Alexandros Katerini	3	1955, 1959, 1961
Apollon Krya Vrysi	3	1966, 1968, 1970
Filippos Meliki	3	1977, 1993, 1997
Megas Alexandros Trikala	3	1998, 2017, 2019
PAOK Alexandria	3	2011, 2014, 2020
Olympos Katerini	2	1957, 1960
Agrotikos Asteras Plateos	2	1982, 1986
Achilleas Naoussa	2	1985, 1990
Achilleas Neokastro	2	2005, 2013
Vermio Veria	1	1958
Pierikos	1	1962
Anagennisi Giannitsa	1	1964
Megas Alexandros Veria	1	1967
Almopos Aridaea	1	1972
Aiginiakos	1	1976
Atromitos Diavatou	1	1979
Nea Genea Neas Nikomideias	1	1983
Megas Alexandros Alexandrias	1	1984
Nisaiakos Nisi	1	1988
A.E. Chariessa	1	1991
Veria Football Academy	1	2004
Ethnikos Kleiditou	1	2006
Lefkadia	1	2010
Enosi Apostolou Pavlou	1	2012
A.S. Eirinoupoli	1	2015
Asteras Tripotamou	1	2022
Megas Alexandros Agias Marinas	1	2023
Veria	1	2025

== Cup ==
The clubs of Imathia FCA are allowed to participate in the institution of the cup.

=== Winners ===
Season	Winner
Central-Western Macedonia Football Clubs Association
1971–72	Almopos Aridea
1972–73	A.M.S. Alexandreia
1973–74	PAO Koryfi
1974–75	Lefkadia
1975–76	Megas Alexandros Veria
1976–77	Ethikos Katerini
1977–78	Nea Genea Nea Nikomideia
1978–79	Doxa Makrochori
1979–80	Pierikos
Central Macedonia Football Clubs Association
1980–81	Doxa Makrochori
1981–82	Doxa Makrochori
1982–83	A.M.S. Alexandreia
1983–84	
1984–85	
1985–86	
1986–87	Ethnikos Kleidi
1987–88	Pontioi Veria
1988–89	Pontioi Veria
1989–90	Doxa Makrochori
1990–91	Achilleas Naousa
1991–92	Veria Academy
1992–93	PAO Kouloura
1993–94	Niki Angathia
1994–95	PAO Kouloura
Imathia Football Clubs Association
1995–96	Doxa Makrochori
1996–97	Niki Angathia
1997–98	Pontioi Veria
1998–99	Pontioi Veria
1999–00	A.E. Alexandreia
2000–01	A.E. Alexandreia
2001–02	Veria
2002–03	Veria
2003–04	A.E. Alexandreia
2004–05	Naoussa
2005–06	A.E. Alexandreia
2006–07	A.E. Alexandreia
2007–08	Naoussa
2008–09	A.E. Alexandreia
2009–10	Naoussa
2010–11	Apostolos Pavlos Union
2011–12	Apostolos Pavlos Union
2012–13	Achilleas Neokastro
2013–14	A.E. Kapsochora
2014–15	PAOK Alexandreia
2015–16	PAOK Alexandreia
2016–17	A.E. Alexandreia
2017–18	Megas Alexandros Trikala
2018–19	Veria NFC
2019–20	Agrotikos Asteras Plateos
2020–21	Suspended due to COVID-19
2021–22	Asteras Tripotamos
2022–23	Megas Alexandros Agia Marina
2023–24	Naoussa
2024–25	Naoussa
2025–26	Naoussa

=== Finals ===
Season	Winner	Result	Runner-up
Central-Western Macedonia Football Clubs Association
1971–72	Almopos Aridea		
1972–73	A.M.S. Alexandreia		Apollon Litochoro
1973–74	PAO Koryfi		
1974–75	Lefkadia		
1975–76	Megas Alexandros Veria		
1976–77	Ethikos Katerini		
1977–88	Nea Genea Nea Nikomideia		
1978–79	Doxa Makrochori		
1979–80	Pierikos		
Central Macedonia Football Clubs Association
1980–81	Doxa Makrochori		
1981–82	Doxa Makrochori		
1982–83	A.M.S. Alexandreia		
1983–84			
1984–85			
1985–86			
1986–87	Ethnikos Kleidi		
1987–88	Pontioi Veria		
1988–89	Pontioi Veria		
1989–90	Doxa Makrochori		
1990–91	Achilleas Naousa	4–1	Ethnikos Kleidi
1991–92	Veria Academy	6–4 (p)	Doxa Agia Triada
1992–93	PAO Kouloura	6–5 (p)	Doxa Makrochori
1993–94	Niki Angathia	2–0	Keravnos Episkopis Naousa
1994–95	PAO Kouloura	2–1	A.S. Irinoupoli
Imathia Football Clubs Association
1995–96	Doxa Makrochori	1–0	Niki Angathia
1996–97	Niki Angathia	7–6 (p)	Pontioi Veria
1997–98	Pontioi Veria	1–0	G.A.S. Radochori
1998–99	Pontioi Veria	2–1 (a.e.t.)	Megas Alexandros Trikala
1999–00	A.E. Alexandreia	2–0	Philippos Meliki
2000–01	A.E. Alexandreia	2–0	Apostolos Pavlos Union
2001–02	Veria	4–1	G.A.S. Radochori
2002–03	Veria	6–0	Naoussa
2003–04	A.E. Alexandreia	3–1	Megas Alexandros Trikala
2004–05	Naoussa	2–1	Agrotikos Asteras Agia Varvara
2005–06	A.E. Alexandreia	2–1	Philippos Meliki
2006–07	A.E. Alexandreia	1–0	A.S. Patrida
2007–08	Naoussa	4–1	PAO Koryfi
2008–09	A.E. Alexandreia	3–2	A.S. Patrida
2009–10	Naoussa	4–0	Thyella Stavros
2010–11	Apostolos Pavlos Union	3–0	Keravnos Episkopis Naousa
2011–12	Apostolos Pavlos Union	2–1	Philippos Meliki
2012–13	Achilleas Neokastro	2–0	Apostolos Pavlos Union
2013–14	A.E. Kapsochora	2–1	PAOK Alexandreia
2014–15	PAOK Alexandreia	2–0 (a.e.t.)	Naoussa
2015–16	PAOK Alexandreia	5–4 (p)	Naoussa
2016–17	A.E. Alexandreia	2–0	G.A.S. Radochori
2017–18	Megas Alexandros Trikala	3–0	PAOK Alexandreia
2018–19	Veria NFC	3–0	Megas Alexandros Trikala
2019–20	Agrotikos Asteras Plateos	without match (draw)	Megas Alexandros Trikala
2020–21	Suspended due to COVID-19		
2021–22	Asteras Tripotamos	5–4 (p)	Megas Alexandros Trikala
2022–23	Megas Alexandros Agia Marina	2–1	Veria B
2023–24	Naoussa	3–0	Apollon Agios Georgios
2024–25	Naoussa	4–0	Apollon Agios Georgios
2025–26	Naoussa	3–0	Apollon Agios Georgios

Source: eps-imathias.gr
