= Lasithi Football Clubs Association =

Association football governing body in Lasithi Prefecture, Greece

- Full name: Lasithi Football Clubs Association; Greek: Ένωση Ποδοσφαιρικών Σωματείων Λασιθίου
- Short name: Lasithi F.C.A.; Greek: Ε.Π.Σ. Λασιθίου
- Founded: 1982; 44 years ago
- Headquarters: Agios Nikolaos, Greece
- FIFA affiliation: Hellenic Football Federation
- President: Georgios Paterakis
- Website: www.epslasithiou.gr

Lasithi Football Clubs Association (Greek: Ένωση Ποδοσφαιρικών Σωματείων Λασιθίου) is a governing body that is responsible for association football in Lasithi Prefecture. Its offices are housed in Agios Nikolaos and it is a member of Hellenic Football Federation. It is responsible for running the local league and cup, as well as the youth and children's leagues. It also coordinates the activities of the mixed youth and children's divisions, which represent the county at national level.

== History ==
Lasithi Football Clubs Association was founded in 1982, when the clubs of the prefecture of Lasithi were separetaded from Heraklion Football Clubs Association.

== League ==
=== Organization ===
The structure of the leagues of the E.P.S. Lasithi for is:

- First division
- Second division

=== Champions ===
Season	Club
1982–83	A.O. Agios Nikolaos
1983–84	A.O. Anagennisi Ierapetra
1984–85	A.O. Niki Sitia
1985–86	O.F. Ierapetra
1986–87	A.O. Anagennisi Ierapetra
1987–88	O.F. Ierapetra
1988–89	A.O. Anagennisi Ierapetra
1989–90	A.O. Agios Nikolaos
1990–91	A.S. Asteras Agios Nikolaos
1991–92	A.S. Keravnos Sitia
1992–93	AE Neapoli
1993–94	O.F. Ierapetra
1994–95	A.S. Pyrgos Kalo Chorio
1995–96	A.O. Anagennisi Ierapetra
1996–97	A.S. Pyrgos Kalo Chorio
1997–98	A.O. Anagennisi Ierapetra
1998–99	A.O. Niki Sitia
1999–2000	O.F. Ierapetra
2000–01	O.F. Ierapetra
2001–02	A.O. Korfos Elounda
2002–03	A.O. Koutsoura
2003–04	A.S. Pyrgos Kalo Chorio
2004–05	A.O. Anagennisi Ierapetra
2005–06	A.O. Kritsa
2006–07	A.O. Lygia
2007–08	A.O. Anagennisi Ierapetra
2008–09	A.S. Ierapetra
2009–10	O.F. Ierapetra
2010–11	A.O. Agios Nikolaos
2011–12	O.F. Ierapetra
2012–13	A.O. Agios Nikolaos
2013–14	A.O. Anagennisi Ierapetra
2014–15	O.F. Ierapetra
2015–16	O.F. Ierapetra
2016–17	O.F. Ierapetra
2017–18	AE Neapoli
2018–19	A.O. Agios Nikolaos
2019–20	AE Neapoli
2020–21	Not held
2021–22	A.O. Niki Sitia
2022–23	Not held^{1}
2023–24	AE Neapoli
2024–25	AE Neapoli
2025–26	AE Neapoli

^{1} None of the institutions of that season were held, as only 4 clubs joined the Registry of the Sports General Secretariat and had the right to participate in them.

== Cup ==
=== Finals ===
Season	Winner	Runner-up	Result	Ground
1983–84	A.O. Agios Nikolaos	A.O. Anagennisi Ierapetra	3–1	Agios Nikolaos Municipal Stadium
1984–85	A.O. Agios Nikolaos	O.F. Ierapetra	3–2	Sitia Municipal Stadium
1985–86	A.O. Agios Nikolaos	A.O. Anagennisi Ierapetra	1–0	Sitia Municipal Stadium
1986–87	A.O. Agios Nikolaos	O.F. Ierapetra	1–0	Sitia Municipal Stadium
1987–88	A.O. Agios Nikolaos	O.F. Ierapetra	4–3	Ierapetra Municipal Stadium
1988–89	A.O. Agios Nikolaos	A.O. Anagennisi Ierapetra	0–0 (5–4 p)	Neapolis Municipal Stadium
1989–90	A.O. Agios Nikolaos	O.F. Ierapetra	1–0	Agios Nikolaos Municipal Stadium
1990–91	O.F. Ierapetra	A.O. Anagennisi Ierapetra	2–1	Sitia Municipal Stadium
1991–92	O.F. Ierapetra	A.O. Agios Nikolaos	1–1 (6–5 p)	Ierapetra Municipal Stadium
1992–93	A.O. Anagennisi Ierapetra	A.S. Keravnos Sitia	2–0	Agios Nikolaos Municipal Stadium
1993–94	A.O. Agios Nikolaos	A.S. Keravnos Sitia	8–0	Neapolis Municipal Stadium
1994–95	A.O. Anagennisi Ierapetra	A.S. Pyrgos Kalo Chorio	1–0	Sitia Municipal Stadium
1995–96	A.O. Anagennisi Ierapetra	O.F. Ierapetra	1–0	Ierapetra Municipal Stadium
1996–97	A.O. Anagennisi Ierapetra	A.O. Kritsa	4–0	Agios Nikolaos Municipal Stadium
1997–98	A.O. Vrachasi	A.S. Pyrgos Kalo Chorio	0–0 (3–1 p)	Kritsa Municipal Stadium
1998–99	A.O. Korfos Elounda	A.S. Asteras Agios Nikolaos	1–0	Ierapetra Municipal Stadium
1999–2000	O.F. Ierapetra	A.O. Kritsa	2–1	Neapolis Municipal Stadium
2000–01	O.F. Ierapetra	AE Neapolis	3–2	Sitia Municipal Stadium
2001–02	A.O. Korfos Elounda	A.S. Pyrgos Kalo Chorio	4–2	Agios Nikolaos Municipal Stadium
2002–03	A.O. Anagennisi Ierapetra	A.O. Niki Sitia	3–2	Elounda Municipal Stadium
2003–04	A.O. Korfos Elounda	A.O. Agios Nikolaos	2–0	Elounda Municipal Stadium
2004-05	A.O. Agios Nikolaos	O.F. Ierapetra	3–3 (3–1 p)	Ierapetra Municipal Stadium
2005–06	O.F. Ierapetra	A.O. Anagennisi Ierapetra	2–1	Koutsoura Municipal Stadium
2006–07	A.O. Vrachasi	AE Neapolis	2–0 (a.e.t.)	Agios Nikolaos Municipal Stadium
2007–08	O.F. Ierapetra	A.O. Kritsa	3–0	Neapolis Municipal Stadium
2008–09	A.O. Anagennisi Ierapetra	A.O. Kritsa	1–0	Sitia Municipal Stadium
2009–10	O.F. Ierapetra	A.O. Anagennisi Ierapetra	3–1	Agios Nikolaos Municipal Stadium
2010–11	P.O. Ierapetra	A.O. Agios Nikolaos	3–1	Ierapetra Municipal Stadium
2011–12	A.O. Korfos Elounda	A.O.S. Koutsoura	0–0 (8–7 p)	Neapolis Municipal Stadium
2012–13	A.O. Anagennisi Ierapetra	A.E. Lakonia	0–0 (9–8 p)	Sitia Municipal Stadium
2013–14	O.F. Ierapetra	A.O. Niki Sitia	0–0 (5–4 p)	Koutsoura Municipal Stadium
2014–15	O.F. Ierapetra	A.O. Korfos Elounda	1–0	Ierapetra Municipal Stadium
2015–16	O.F. Ierapetra	A.O. Anagennisi Ierapetra	3–1	Neapolis Municipal Stadium
2016–17	O.F. Ierapetra	A.O. Korfos Elounda	3–0 (a.e.t.)	Agios Nikolaos Municipal Stadium
2017–18	O.F. Ierapetra	A.S. Ierapetra	1–0	Agios Nikolaos Municipal Stadium
2018–19	O.F. Ierapetra	AE Neapolis	3–1	Sitia Municipal Stadium
2019–20	A.O. Agios Nikolaos	AE Neapolis	After draw	
2020–21	Suspended			
2021–22	A.O. Agios Nikolaos	A.O. Niki Sitia	4–0	Ierapetra Municipal Stadium
2022–23	Not held			
2023–24	A.O. Agios Nikolaos	A.O. Anagennisi Ierapetra	5–0	Sitia Municipal Stadium

== Super Cup ==
=== Finals ===
Season	Winner	Runner-up	Result
2017	O.F. Ierapetra	A.O. Elounda	6–0
2018	O.F. Ierapetra	A.O. Agios Nikolaos	3–0
2019	O.F. Ierapetra	A.O. Agios Nikolaos	3–0
2020	A.O. Agios Nikolaos	AE Neapolis	2–1 (a.e.t.)
2022	A.O. Agios Nikolaos	A.O. Niki Sitia	Suspended
2024	A.O. Agios Nikolaos	A.E. Neapoli	4–0
2026	A.E. Neapoli	Vrachasi	2–0
