= Theofilos Kouroupis =

Greek footballer

Personal information
- Date of birth: 11 April 1990 (age 36)
- Place of birth: Thessaloniki, Greece
- Height: 1.74 m (5 ft 8 1/2 in)
- Position: Left back

Team information
- Current team: Aspis Pyla

Youth career
- –2008: Agrotikos Asteras

Senior career*
Years	Team	Apps	(Gls)
2008–2009	Irodotos	0	(0)
2009–2010	Frenaros	0	(0)
2010–2011	Eordaikos	1	(0)
2011–2012	Ethnikos Sochos	21	(0)
2012–2013	Korinthos	1	(0)
2013–2014	Anagennisi Giannitsa	16	(0)
2014	Iraklis	6	(0)
2014–2015	Apollon Kalamarias	9	(0)
2015–2016	Pierikos	0	(0)
2016–2018	Rodos	0	(0)
2018–2019	Vereya	29	(1)
2019	Vitosha Bistritsa	9	(0)
2020–2021	Almopos	16	(0)
2021–2022	Aiolikos		
2022–2024	Omonia Aradippou	54	(1)
2024–2025	Anagennisi Deryneia	19	(1)
2025–	Aspis Pyla		
- * Club domestic league appearances and goals as of 26 June 2025

Theofilos Kouroupis (Greek: Θεόφιλος Κουρούπης; born 11 April 1990) is a Greek professional footballer who plays as a left back for Cypriot club Aspis Pyla.

Kouroupis started his career with Agrotikos Asteras having also spells with Irodotos, Frenaros, Eordaikos, Ethnikos Sochos, Korinthos, Anagennisi Giannitsa, Iraklis, Apollon Kalamarias, Pierikos, Rodos and Vereya.

== Career ==
Kouroupis started his career in the youth ranks of Agrotikos Asteras before moving to Cretan club, Irodotos. After leaving Irodotos, he moved to Cypriot Second Division club Frenaros and Eordaikos.

In the 2011–12 season he played for Delta Ethniki club Ethnikos Sochos F.C., making his debut for the club in an away defeat for the opening matchday against Olympiakos Kymina. Totally he appeared in 21 matches for the club.

On 5 July 2012 Kouroupis signed for Korinthos appearing only once for the club. In the 2013 summer transfer window he signed for Anagennisi Giannitsa F.C. He debuted for the club in the opening matchday of the season against Kerkyra. He signed for Iraklis on 30 January 2014. On 1 August 2014 he signed for Apollon Kalamarias.

After a year with the club he signed with Pierikos and Rodos. On 1 July 2018, he signed with Bulgarian club Vereya for an undisclosed fee. A year later he signed with another Bulgarian club Vitosha Bistritsa.
