= Thanasis Patiniotis =

Greek footballer

- Θανάσης Πατινιώτης
- Born: 1 October 1993 (age 33); Kerkyra, Greece
Association football career
- Full name: Athanasios Patiniotis
- Height: 1.74 m (5 ft 9 in)
- Positions: Central midfielder; left winger
Team information
- Current team: Poros
Youth career
- 2006: Kerkyra
Senior career*
Years	Team	Apps	(Gls)
2011–2012	Kerkyra	0	(0)
2012–2013	Kassiopi	19	(2)
2013–2014	AEL	17	(4)
2014–2015	Panachaiki	18	(2)
2015–2016	OFI	14	(1)
2016	Panegialios	7	(0)
2017	Lefkimmi	0	(0)
2017–2019	Atsalenios	18	(0)
2019	Ialysos	5	(0)
2020	Poros	0	(0)
2020-	Atsalenios	0	(0)
- * Club domestic league appearances and goals as of 13 January 2020

Athanasios "Thanasis" Patiniotis (Greek : Θανάσης Πατινιώτης, born 1 October 1993) is a professional Greek footballer, who plays for Atsalenios.

He plays as a midfielder for Atsalenios. Although the player had an agreement with AEL on August 6, 2015, the club's major shareholder Alexis Kougias, announced a day later that he finally won't join the "crimsons", following the recommendations of the team's coach Ratko Dostanić.
