= Athanasios Stojnović =

Serbian footballer

Personal information
- Full name: Athanasios Stojnović
- Date of birth: 17 February 2003 (age 23)
- Place of birth: Komotini, Greece
- Height: 1.78 m (5 ft 10 in)
- Position: Midfielder

Team information
- Current team: Kavala

Youth career
- 2013–2019: PAOK
- 2019–2020: 1. FC Nürnberg

Senior career*
Years	Team	Apps	(Gls)
2020–2022	AEL	0	(0)
2021	→ Triglia (loan)	6	(0)
2021	→ Alexandroupoli (loan)		
2022	Niki Volos	3	(0)
2022	Zlatibor		
2023	Panthrakikos		
2024	Kavala		
2024–2026	Panthrakikos		
2026–	Kavala		
- * Club domestic league appearances and goals as of 23 October 2024

Athanasios Stojnović (Greek: Αθανάσιος Στοΐνοβιτς; born 17 February 2003) is a Serbian professional footballer who plays as a midfielder for Greek Gamma Ethniki club Kavala.

== Personal life ==
His father is Kavala manager Zoran Stoinovic.
