= Lampros Politis =

Greek footballer

Personal information
- Date of birth: 12 September 1995 (age 31)
- Place of birth: Chalkida, Greece
- Height: 1.77 m (5 ft 9 1/2 in)
- Position: Midfielder

Team information
- Current team: Nea Artaki

Youth career
- Iraklis Psachna

Senior career*
Years	Team	Apps	(Gls)
2014–2015	Iraklis Psachna	12	(0)
2015–2017	Apollon Smyrnis	1	(0)
2016–2017	→ Chalkida (loan)	0	(0)
2017–2018	Chalkida	0	(0)
2018–2020	Ethnikos Piraeus		
2020–2021	Agios Ierotheos		
2021–2022	Anagennisi Karditsa	30	(4)
2022	Kalamata	0	(0)
2022–2023	Chania	9	(1)
2023	Anagennisi Karditsa	13	(6)
2023–2024	Niki Volos	31	(3)
2024–	Nea Artaki	0	(0)
- * Club domestic league appearances and goals as of 15 June 2023

Lampros Politis (Greek: Λάμπρος Πολίτης; born 12 December 1995) is a Greek professional footballer who plays as an attacking midfielder for Gamma Ethniki club Nea Artaki.
