= Georgios Pitharoulis =

Greek footballer (born 1990)

Personal information
- Date of birth: 4 June 1990 (age 36)
- Place of birth: Levanger Municipality, Norway
- Height: 1.85 m (6 ft 1 in)
- Position: Midfielder

Youth career
- Levanger FK

Senior career*
Years	Team	Apps	(Gls)
2006–2007	Kritsas F.C.	0	(0)
2007–2009	OFI	3	(0)
2009–2010	Chersonissos	9	(3)
2010–2011	Panthrakikos	4	(0)
2011	Panachaiki	3	(0)
2011–2012	Helmond Sport	1	(0)
2012–2014	Chania	20	(0)
2014–2015	Episkopi	0	(0)
2015–2016	OFI	0	(0)
2016–2017	Agios Nikolaos	0	(0)
2017–	Ierapetra	0	(0)
- * Club domestic league appearances and goals as of 15 September 2013

Georgios Pitharoulis (Greek: Γεώργιος Πιθαρούλης; born 4 June 1990) is a Greek footballer who plays as a midfielder for Ierapetra.

== Club career ==
Pitharoulis' career in the Super League Greece began in 2007, when he signed a professional contract with OFI. During the second half of the 2009–10 season, he competed for Panthrakikos. He left Panthrakikos in December 2010 and joined Beta Ethniki rival Panachaiki. In summer 2011 after only a half year with Panachaiki signed in the Netherlands for Helmond Sport. Pitharoulis played only one Jupiler League game for Helmond Sport and returned in January 2012 to Greece, who signed now with AO Chania.

== International career ==
Pitharoulis played the 2009 Mediterranean Games for Greece in the Football Competition in Pescara, Italy.

== Career statistics ==
As of 7 March 2022

Appearances and goals by club, season and competition
Club	Season	League			National cup		Continental		Total	
Club	Season	Division	Apps	Goals	Apps	Goals	Apps	Goals	Apps	Goals
Kritsas F.C.	2006–07	Regional								
OFI	2007–08	Super League Greece	0	0	0	0	0	0	0	0
OFI	2008–09	Super League Greece	3	0	0	0	0	0	3	0
Chersonissos	2009–10	Gamma Ethniki	9	3	0	0	0	0	9	3
Panthrakikos	2009–10	Super League Greece	4	0	0	0	0	0	4	0
Panthrakikos	2010–11	Football League Greece								
Career total			16	3	0	0	0	0	16	3
