= Amvrysseas F.C. =

Amvrysseas
- Full name: A.P.O. Amvrysseas Distomo
- Founded: 1928; 98 years ago
- Ground: Distomo Municipal Stadium
- Capacity: 500
- Chairman: Ilias Kavalagios
- Manager: Makis Tsanidis
- League: Boeotia FCA Second Division
- 2025–26: Boeotia FCA First Division, 14th (relegated)
- Website: http://amvrisseasfc.blogspot.gr/

Amvrysseas Football Club (Greek: Α.Π.Ο. Αμβρυσσέας Διστόμου) is a Greek football club based in Distomo, Boeotia, Greece.

== Honours ==
=== Domestic ===
- Boeotia FCA Champions: 2
  - 2016–17, 2019–20
