= Lucas Ramos (footballer, born 1995) =

Brazilian footballer (born 1995)

Personal information
- Full name: Lucas Ramos de Oliveira
- Date of birth: 18 January 1995 (age 31)
- Place of birth: São Paulo, Brazil
- Height: 1.87 m (6 ft 2 in)
- Position: Defensive midfielder

Team information
- Current team: Irtysh Pavlodar
- Number: 35

Youth career
- Guarani

Senior career*
Years	Team	Apps	(Gls)
2016	Itapirense	12	(0)
2017	Elosport		
2018	XV de Jaú	7	(2)
2018–2019	Apollon Larissa	24	(1)
2019–2020	Lamia	1	(0)
2020	Flamurtari	15	(0)
2020–2021	Laçi	16	(0)
2021	Veria	9	(0)
2022	PAEEK	10	(0)
2022–2023	Dewa United	28	(2)
2023–2024	Othellos Athienou	27	(0)
2024–2025	Kotwica Kołobrzeg	20	(0)
2025–2026	Odra Opole	25	(2)
2026–	Irtysh Pavlodar	13	(0)
- * Club domestic league appearances and goals as of 1 November 2026

Lucas Ramos de Oliveira (born 18 January 1995) is a Brazilian professional footballer who plays as a defensive midfielder for Kazakhstan Premier League club Irtysh Pavlodar.

== Career ==
=== Flamurtari ===
In February 2020, Ramos joined Albanian club Flamurtari. He made his league debut for the club on 16 February 2020, playing the entirety of a 1–0 away victory over Luftëtari.

== Career statistics ==
As of match played 18 October 2026

Appearances and goals by club, season and competition
Club	Season	League			National cup (Note: Includes Greek Cup, Albanian Cup, Cypriot Cup, Polish Cup)		Continental		Other		Total	
Club	Season	Division	Apps	Goals	Apps	Goals	Apps	Goals	Apps	Goals	Apps	Goals
Apollon Larissa	2018–19	Super League Greece 2	25	1	4	0	—		—		29	1
Lamia	2019–20	Super League Greece	1	0	2	0	—		—		3	0
Flamurtari	2019–20	Kategoria Superiore	14	0	1	0	—		—		15	0
Laçi	2020–21	Kategoria Superiore	15	0	3	0	1 (Note: Appearance in UEFA Europa League)	0	—		19	0
Veria	2021–22	Super League Greece	9	0	0	0	—		—		9	0
PAEEK	2021–22	Cypriot First Division	10	0	1	1	—		—		11	1
Dewa United	2022–23	Liga 1	28	2	0	0	—		4 (Note: Appearances in Piala Presiden)	0	32	2
Othellos Athienou	2023–24	Cypriot First Division	27	0	1	0	—		—		28	0
Kotwica Kołobrzeg	2024–25	I liga	20	0	2	0	—		—		22	0
Odra Opole	2025–26	I liga	25	2	2	0	—		—		27	2
Irtysh Pavlodar	2026	Kazakhstan Premier League	13	0	0	0	—		—		13	0
Career total			187	5	16	1	1	0	4	0	208	6
