= Manolis Perdikis =

Greek footballer

Personal information
- Full name: Emmanouil Perdikis
- Date of birth: 29 August 1999 (age 27)
- Place of birth: Greece
- Height: 1.90 m (6 ft 3 in)
- Position: Centre-back

Team information
- Current team: Veria
- Number: 21

Youth career
- 2017–2019: OFI

Senior career*
Years	Team	Apps	(Gls)
2019–2020	OFI	1	(0)
2020–2021	Ierapetra	10	(1)
2021–	Veria	20	(0)
- * Club domestic league appearances and goals as of 16 June 2023

Manolis Perdikis (Greek: Μανώλης Περδίκης; born 29 August 1999) is a Greek professional footballer who plays as a centre-back for Super League 2 club Veria.
