= Andreas Antonakopoulos =

Greek footballer

Personal information
- Date of birth: 15 March 1997 (age 29)
- Place of birth: Greece
- Height: 1.77 m (5 ft 10 in)
- Position: Striker

Youth career
- –2017: Panionios

Senior career*
Years	Team	Apps	(Gls)
2017–2020	Panachaiki	16	(1)
2020–2021	Ermionida		
2021–2022	Panelefsiniakos		
2022–2023	Aris Petroupolis		
2023–2025	Evosmos		
2025–2026	Foinikas Polichni		
- * Club domestic league appearances and goals as of 10 March 2020

Andreas Antonakopoulos (Greek: Ανδρέας Αντωνακόπουλος; born 15 March 1997) is a Greek professional footballer who plays as a striker.
