= Panagiotis Manios =

Greek footballer

Personal information
- Full name: Panagiotis Manios
- Date of birth: 26 May 1996 (age 30)
- Place of birth: Siatista, Greece
- Height: 1.82 m (6 ft 0 in)
- Position: Forward

Team information
- Current team: Anagennisi Karditsa
- Number: 25

Senior career*
Years	Team	Apps	(Gls)
2017–2018	AO Kardias		
2018–2019	Aris Paleochori		
2019–2020	Edessaikos		
2020–2021	Almopos Aridea	17	(8)
2021–	Anagennisi Karditsa	21	(3)
- * Club domestic league appearances and goals as of 1 May 2022

Panagiotis Manios (Greek: Παναγιώτης Μάνιος; born 26 May 1996) is a Greek professional footballer who plays as a forward for Super League 2 club Anagennisi Karditsa.
