= Boeotia Football Clubs Association =

- Full name: Boeotia Football Clubs Association; Greek: Ένωση Ποδοσφαιρικών Σωματείων Βοιωτίας
- Short name: Boeotia F.C.A.; Greek: Ε.Π.Σ. Βοιωτίας
- Founded: 1973; 53 years ago
- Headquarters: Livadeia, Greece
- FIFA affiliation: Hellenic Football Federation
- President: Lampros Balokas
- Website: www.epsvoiotias.gr

Boeotia Football Clubs Association (Greek: Ένωση Ποδοσφαιρικών Σωματείων Βοιωτίας) is the governing body of association football in the regional unit of Boeotia, Greece. Based in Livadeia, it is a member of the Hellenic Football Federation (HFF). It is responsible for organizing local league championships and the local Cup, as well as youth championships. It also coordinates the regional representative teams (Youth and Children), which compete at the national level.

== History ==
It was founded as an independent association in 1973; in previous years, specifically from 1928 to 1973, teams from the Boeotia region participated in competitions organized by the Euboea Football Clubs Association (as the Euboea–Boeotia FCA).

Under its jurisdiction are the regional Cup and league competitions. In the men's category during the 2024–25 season, two divisions existed: the A Category with 11 clubs, and the B Category with two groups of 12 and 14 clubs each.

== League ==
=== Champions ===
Source: ellinikopodosfero.com

=== A Category Champions ===
| Season | Champion |
|---|---|
| 1974–75 | Dafni Erythres |
| 1975–76 | Dafni Erythres |
| 1976–77 | A.O. Thiva |
| 1977–78 | Dafni Erythres |
| 1978–79 | Orchomenos F.C. |
| 1979–80 | A.O. Erkyna Livadeia |
| 1980–81 | A.O. Thiva |
| 1981–82 | Dafni Erythres |
| 1982–83 | A.S. Schimatari |
| 1983–84 | P.A.O. Kyriaki |
| 1984–85 | Panaliartos |
| 1985–86 | P.A.O. Kyriaki |
| 1986–87 | Panaliartos |
| 1987–88 | P.A.O. Kyriaki |
| 1988–89 | A.O. Thiva |
| 1989–90 | Dafni Erythres |
| 1990–91 | Anagennisi Schimatari |
| 1991–92 | Pelopidas Thiva |
| 1992–93 | Atromitos Agios Meletios |
| 1993–94 | Orchomenos F.C. |
| 1994–95 | P.A.O. Kyriaki |
| 1995–96 | Anagennisi Schimatari |
| 1996–97 | Epaminondas Leuktra |
| 1997–98 | Pamvagiakos |
| 1998–99 | Epaminondas Leuktra |
| 1999–00 | Epaminondas Leuktra |
| 2000–01 | Dafni Erythres |
| 2001–02 | A.O. Agios Thomas |
| 2002–03 | A.O. Thiva |
| 2003–04 | Anagennisi Schimatari |
| 2004–05 | A.O. Agios Thomas |
| 2005–06 | Anagennisi Orchomenos |
| 2006–07 | Dafni Erythres |
| 2007–08 | Panaliartos |
| 2008–09 | A.E. Dilesi |
| 2009–10 | Dafni Erythres |
| 2010–11 | Enosi Aspra Spitia Antikyra |
| 2011–12 | Parnassos Arachova |
| 2012–13 | Enosi Aspra Spitia Antikyra |
| 2013–14 | Parnassos Arachova |
| 2014–15 | A.O. Thiva |
| 2015–16 | A.O. Thiva |
| 2016–17 | Amvrysseas Distomo |
| 2017–18 | A.O. Ypato |
| 2018–19 | Kithairon Kaparelli |
| 2019–20 | Amvrysseas Distomo |
| 2020–21 | Cancelled |
| 2021–22 | Kyparissos Antikyra |
| 2022–23 | Ellopiakos |
| 2023–24 | A.O. Thiva |
| 2024–25 | Anagennisi Schimatari |
| 2025–26 | A.O. Thiva |

=== Performance by club ===
| Club | Titles | Season |
|---|---|---|
| Dafni Erythres | 8 | 1975, 1976, 1978, 1982, 1990, 2001, 2007, 2010 |
| A.O. Thiva | 8 | 1977, 1981, 1989, 2003, 2015, 2016, 2024, 2026 |
| P.A.O. Kyriaki | 4 | 1984, 1986, 1988, 1995 |
| Anagennisi Schimatari | 4 | 1991, 1996, 2004, 2025 |
| Panaliartos | 3 | 1985, 1987, 2008 |
| Orchomenos / Anagennisi Orchomenos | 3 | 1979, 1994, 2006 |
| Epaminondas Leuktra | 3 | 1997, 1999, 2000 |
| A.O. Agios Thomas | 2 | 2002, 2005 |
| Enosi Aspra Spitia Antikyra | 2 | 2011, 2013 |
| Parnassos Arachova | 2 | 2012, 2014 |
| Amvrysseas Distomo | 2 | 2017, 2020 |
| A.O. Erkyna Livadeia | 1 | 1980 |
| A.S. Schimatari | 1 | 1983 |
| Pelopidas Thiva | 1 | 1992 |
| Atromitos Agios Meletios | 1 | 1993 |
| Pamvagiakos | 1 | 1998 |
| A.E. Dilesi | 1 | 2009 |
| A.O. Ypato | 1 | 2018 |
| Kithairon Kaparelli | 1 | 2019 |
| Kyparissos Antikyra | 1 | 2022 |
| Ellopiakos | 1 | 2023 |

== Cup ==
=== Cup Winners ===
| Season | Winner |
|---|---|
| 1974–75 | Dafni Erythres |
| 1975–76 | Pangeorgikos |
| 1976–77 | Dafni Erythres |
| 1977–78 | A.S. Schimatari |
| 1978–79 | A.O. Thiva |
| 1979–80 | A.O. Thiva |
| 1980–81 | A.E. Orchomenos |
| 1981–82 | A.O. Thiva |
| 1982–83 | A.S. Schimatari |
| 1983–84 | Frixos Orchomenos |
| 1984–85 | Ionikos Asteras Thiva |
| 1985–86 | A.E. Orchomenos |
| 1986–87 | P.A.O. Kyriaki |
| 1987–88 | Olympiada Oinofyta |
| 1988–89 | Kithairon Kaparelli |
| 1989–90 | A.O. Thiva |
| 1990–91 | A.O. Thiva |
| 1991–92 | A.O. Thiva |
| 1992–93 | Dafni Erythres |
| 1993–94 | A.O. Thiva |
| 1994–95 | A.E. Orchomenos |
| 1995–96 | A.O. Thiva |
| 1996–97 | Epaminondas Leuktra |
| 1997–98 | Epaminondas Leuktra |
| 1998–99 | Pangeorgikos |
| 1999–00 | Kithairon Kaparelli |
| 2000–01 | Levadiakos |
| 2001–02 | Epaminondas Leuktra |
| 2002–03 | Epaminondas Leuktra |
| 2003–04 | A.O. Thiva |
| 2004–05 | A.O. Dionysos |
| 2005–06 | A.E. Orchomenos |
| 2006–07 | Levadiakos U20 |
| 2007–08 | Kithairon Kaparelli |
| 2008–09 | Enosi Aspra Spitia Antikyra |
| 2009–10 | A.E. Dilesi |
| 2010–11 | Dafni Erythres |
| 2011–12 | Enosi Aspra Spitia Antikyra |
| 2012–13 | Epaminondas Leuktra |
| 2013–14 | Parnassos Arachova |
| 2014–15 | A.O. Thiva |
| 2015–16 | Epaminondas Leuktra |
| 2016–17 | Anagennisi Schimatari |
| 2017–18 | A.O. Thiva |
| 2018–19 | A.O. Ypato |
| 2019–20 | A.O. Melissochori |
| 2020–21 | Cancelled |
| 2021–22 | A.O. Ypato |
| 2022–23 | A.O. Ypato |
| 2023–24 | A.O. Ypato |
| 2024–25 | Kithairon Kaparelli |
| 2025–26 | Kithairon Kaparelli |

=== Performance by club ===
| Club | Titles | Season |
|---|---|---|
| A.O. Thiva | 11 | 1979, 1980, 1982, 1990, 1991, 1992, 1994, 1996, 2004, 2015, 2018 |
| Epaminondas Leuktra | 6 | 1997, 1998, 2002, 2003, 2013, 2016 |
| Kithairon Kaparelli | 5 | 1989, 2000, 2008, 2025, 2026 |
| Dafni Erythres | 4 | 1975, 1977, 1993, 2011 |
| A.E. Orchomenos | 4 | 1981, 1986, 1995, 2006 |
| A.O. Ypato | 4 | 2019, 2022, 2023, 2024 |
| Pangeorgikos | 2 | 1976, 1999 |
| A.S. Schimatari | 2 | 1978, 1983 |
| Enosi Aspra Spitia Antikyra | 2 | 2009, 2012 |
| Frixos Orchomenos | 1 | 1984 |
| Ionikos Asteras Thiva | 1 | 1985 |
| P.A.O. Kyriaki | 1 | 1987 |
| Olympiada Oinofyta | 1 | 1988 |
| Levadiakos | 1 | 2001 |
| A.O. Dionysos | 1 | 2005 |
| Levadiakos U20 | 1 | 2007 |
| A.E. Dilesi | 1 | 2010 |
| Parnassos Arachova | 1 | 2014 |
| Anagennisi Schimatari | 1 | 2017 |
| A.O. Melissochori | 1 | 2020 |

== Super Cup ==
The Boeotia Super Cup is a football match played between the champion and the cup winner of the previous season. It was organized for the first time in 2018.

=== Finals ===
| Season | Final | Full Time | Extra Time | Penalties |
|---|---|---|---|---|
| 2017–18 | A.O. Ypato – A.O. Thiva | 4–0 | | |
| 2018–19 | A.O. Ypato – Kyparissos Antikyra | 1–0 | | |
| 2021–22 | A.O. Ypato – Kithairon Kaparelli | 3–2 | | |
| 2022–23 | A.O. Ypato – Ellopiakos | 2–0 | | |

== Teams in national divisions ==
Three teams participate in national divisions in the 2026–27 season :

- Super League 1:
  - Levadiakos
- Gamma Ethniki:
  - Anagennisi Schimatari
  - A.O. Thiva
