= Fotis Goudroubis =

Greek footballer (born in 1995)

Personal information
- Full name: Fotios Goudroubis
- Date of birth: 22 July 1995 (age 31)
- Place of birth: Larissa, Greece
- Height: 1.85 m (6 ft 1 in)
- Position: Striker

Team information
- Current team: Tilikratis
- Number: 9

Youth career
- AEL

Senior career*
Years	Team	Apps	(Gls)
2012–2013	AEL	0	(0)
2012–2013	→ Elassona (loan)	20	(7)
2013–2015	Oikonomos Tsaritsani	40	(7)
2015–2016	Farkadona	8	(1)
2016	Dotieas Agia	11	(2)
2016–2017	Apollon Larissa	6	(1)
2017–2018	Pierikos	23	(7)
2018–	Apollon Larissa	41	(4)
- * Club domestic league appearances and goals as of 8 May 2021

Fotis Goudroubis (Greek: Φώτης Γκουντρουμπής; born 21 September 1995) is a Greek professional footballer who plays as a striker for Super League 2 club Tilikratis.
