= Gertin Hoxhalli =

Albanian footballer

Personal information
- Date of birth: 5 November 1996 (age 30)
- Place of birth: Korçë, Albania
- Height: 1.75 m (5 ft 9 in)
- Position: Attacking midfielder

Team information
- Current team: Panionios

Youth career
- –2013: Proteas Paleas Fokaia
- 2013–2015: Panachaiki

Senior career*
Years	Team	Apps	(Gls)
2013–2015	Panachaiki	27	(1)
2015–2019	AEL	17	(0)
2017–2018	→ Kallithea (loan)	28	(0)
2020–2021	Kallithea	5	(0)
2021–2023	Egaleo	41	(2)
2023–	Panionios	0	(0)

International career^{‡}
2014	Albania U19	4	(0)
- * Club domestic league appearances and goals as of 19 July 2023 ‡ National team caps and goals as of 24 October 2015

Gertin Hoxhalli (Greek: Γκέρτιν Χοτζάλι; born 5 November 1996) is an Albanian professional footballer who plays as an attacking midfielder for Gamma Ethniki club Panionios.

== Club career ==
=== Early career ===
Hoxhalli started his career from Palaia Fokaia-based amateur club Proteas.

=== Panachaiki ===
On January 4, 2013, he signed a professional contract with Football League team Panachaiki. He remained in the club for 2,5 seasons, making a total of 28 appearances (27 League, 1 Cup). On 24 July 2015, he signed a 3-years contract with AEL.

== International career ==
Hoxhalli was also an active international player of Albania U19. He made his debut for the 2015 UEFA European Under-19 Championship qualifiers (Group 7), on 12 November 2014 against Denmark.

== Career statistics ==
=== Club ===
As of 31 July 2015

Season	Club	League country	League		League Cup		Europe		Total	
Season	Club	League country	Apps	Goals	Apps	Goals	Apps	Goals	Apps	Goals
2012–13	Panachaiki	Football League (Greece)	8	0	0	0	-	-	8	0
2013–14	Panachaiki	Football League (Greece)	8	0	1	0	-	-	9	0
2014–15	Panachaiki	Football League (Greece)	11	1	0	0	-	-	11	1
Total			27	1	1	0	0	0	28	1
Career total			27	1	1	0	0	0	28	1
