= Carlos Buxton Opoku =

Ghanaian football player (born 1998)

Carlos Buxton
Personal information
- Full name: Carlos Buxton Opoku
- Date of birth: 6 September 1998 (age 28)
- Place of birth: Peschiera del Garda, Italy
- Height: 1.68 m (5 ft 6 in)
- Position: Forward

Team information
- Current team: Fostiras

Youth career
- –2017: Hellas Verona

Senior career*
Years	Team	Apps	(Gls)
2017–2018	Hellas Verona	0	(0)
2017	→ Paganese (loan)	4	(0)
2018–2019	GSD Ambrosiana	31	(2)
2019–2020	Ethnikos Latsion	14	(7)
2020–2021	Roccella		
2021	ENAD		
2021–2022	Ermis Meligou		
2022	Ilioupolis	0	(0)
2022	Fostiras	0	(0)
- * Club domestic league appearances and goals as of 17:56, 11 October 2022 (UTC)

Carlos Buxton Opoku (born 6 September 1998) is a Ghanaian football player who currently plays for Greek club Fostiras. He also holds Italian citizenship.

== Club career ==
He made his Serie C debut for Paganese on 26 August 2017 in a game against Bisceglie.
