= Athlitiki Enosi Alexandreia F.C. =

A.E. Alexandreia
- Full name: Αθλητική Ένωση Aλεξάνδρειας
- Nickname: Πράσινοι (Greens)
- Founded: 1997; 29 years ago
- Ground: Alexandreia Municipal Stadium, Alexandreia, Imathia, Greece
- Manager: Antonis Papatzikos
- League: Imathia FCA First Division
- 2025–26: Gamma Ethniki (Group 2), 5th (relegated)
Home colours	Away colours

The logo of Diagoras Sevasti F.C.

A.E. Alexandreia F.C. (Greek: Α.Ε. Αλεξάνδρειας), full name Athlitiki Enosi Alexandreia (Αθλητική Ένωση Αλεξάνδρειας, Athletic Union of Alexandria) is a Greek football club, based in Alexandreia, Imathia, Greece.

== History ==
=== A.E. Alexandreia (1997–2017) ===
Athlitiki Enosi Alexandreia was founded in 1997 through the renaming of A.E. Kapsochora, which was officially approved in September 1998, in order to serve as the successor to A.M.S. Alexandria after the latter became inactive following its relegation from the 1994–95 Delta Ethniki.

A.E. Alexandreia earned promotion to the Delta Ethniki in 2001 and competed in the fourth tier for 12 consecutive seasons. In 2013, the club was relegated to the regional Imathia FCA championship. During the 2016–17 season, the team finished 2nd in the Imathia FCA league and failed to achieve promotion to the Gamma Ethniki. The club subsequently became inactive during the 2017–18 and 2018–19 seasons, choosing not to submit entries for the Imathia FCA First Division and C Division respectively.

=== A.S. Philippos Alexandreia (2017–2018) ===
In the summer of 2017, the board initiated the acquisition and relocation of Diagoras Sevastis' tax registration number, with the entity being renamed Athlitikos Syllogos Philippos Alexandreia. This allowed the club to take Diagoras' slot and compete in the 2017–18 Gamma Ethniki. Following its relegation at the end of the season, A.S. Filippos Alexandria became inactive and failed to submit an entry for the Imathia FCA A Division.

=== A.E. Alexandreia (2019–present) ===
A.E. Alexandreia reactivated its football department for the 2019–20 season following two years of inactivity, competing in the C Division of the Imathia FCA. Over the course of four years, the club climbed through the divisions of the Imathia FCA, culminating in winning the Imathia FCA top division championship in the 2023–24 season. This earned them a spot in the 2024 Greek Football Clubs Association Winners' Championship, where A.E. Alexandreia successfully secured promotion to the Gamma Ethniki.

During the 2025–26 season, despite successfully securing its status in the division on the pitch, A.E. Alexandreia announced its inability to participate in the third tier for the following season due to financial and operational difficulties.

== Honours ==
=== Domestic Titles and honours ===
as Diagoras Sevasti

  - Pieria FCA Champions: 1
    - 2015–16

as A.E. Alexandreia

  - Delta Ethniki Champions: 1
    - 1984–85
  - Imathia FCA Champions: 4
    - 1979–80, 1993–94, 1999–00, 2000–01
  - Imathia FCA Cup Winners: 7
    - 1999–00, 2000–01, 2003–04, 2005–06, 2006–07, 2008–09, 2016–17
