= Konstantinos Kritikos =

Greek footballer

Personal information
- Date of birth: 21 October 1991 (age 35)
- Place of birth: Athens, Greece
- Height: 1.86 m (6 ft 1 in)
- Positions: Right back; centre back

Youth career
- Olympiacos U20

Senior career*
Years	Team	Apps	(Gls)
2010–2011	Olympiacos F.C.	7	(0)
2010	→ Zakynthos (loan)	14	(0)
2011	→ Rouf F.C. (loan)	11	(0)
2011	Glyfada F.C.	16	(0)
2012	Ethnikos Piraeus F.C.	16	(0)
2014	FC Pommern Greifswald	13	(0)
2014–	Fostiras F.C.	12	(0)
2015	OFI	0	(0)
2015–2016	Episkopi F.C.	10	(0)
2016–2022	Aiolikos	89	(2)
2022–2023	Diagoras Agia Paraskevi		
- * Club domestic league appearances and goals

Konstantinos Kritikos (Greek: Κωνσταντίνος Κρητικός; born 21 October 1991) is a Greek footballer who last played as a right back for Diagoras Agia Paraskevi.

== Career ==
Kritikos began playing football with Olympiacos U20. He was loaned to Zakynthos for one year from Olympiacos. In January 2011 Kritikos was loaned to Rouf F.C. He also played for Glyfada F.C. and Ethnikos Piraeus F.C.

In January 2014, Kritikos signed for NOFV-Oberliga Nord club FC Pommern Greifswald. In August 2014, Kritikos signed for Football League (Greece) club Fostiras F.C. In February 2015, Kritikos signed for Super League club OFI. In July 2015, Kritikos signed for Football League club Episkopi F.C. In January 2016, he signed for Aiolikos.
