= Fábio Tavares (footballer, born 1988) =

Portuguese footballer

Personal information
- Full name: Fábio Ruben Moreira Tavares
- Date of birth: 26 March 1988 (age 38)
- Place of birth: Almada, Portugal
- Height: 1.87 m (6 ft 1 1/2 in)
- Position: Forward

Team information
- Current team: ME Asteras

Youth career
- 2000–2001: Monte Caparica
- 2001–2007: Pescadores

Senior career*
| Years | Team | Apps | (Gls) |
| 2007–2008 | Odivelas | 0 | (0) |
| 2008–2009 | Loures | | |
| 2009–2011 | Estrela Vendas Novas | 26 | (6) |
| 2012 | Chania | 16 | (2) |
| 2012 | Anagennisi Giannitsa | 12 | (2) |
| 2013–2015 | Atromitos | 26 | (0) |
| 2015 | → Kerkyra (loan) | 11 | (1) |
| 2015–2016 | Kerkyra | 17 | (1) |
| 2016–2018 | Apollon Pontus | 5 | (0) |
| 2018 | Rodos | | |
| 2018–2019 | Niki Volos | | |
| 2019–2020 | Ilisiakos | | |
| 2020–2022 | Ilioupoli | | |
| 2022–2023 | ME Asteras | | |
| 2023–2024 | Nea Ionia | | |
| 2024– | Doxa Vyronas | | |
- * Club domestic league appearances and goals as of 20 May 2018

Fábio Ruben Moreira Tavares (born 26 March 1988 in Almada, Setúbal District) is a Portuguese professional footballer who plays as a forward for Doxa Vyronas football club.
