= A.E. Neapoli F.C. =

Greek football club

A.E. Neapoli
- Full name: Athlitiki Enosi Neapoli
- Founded: 1968; 58 years ago
- Ground: Neapoli Municipal Stadium
- Capacity: 1,000
- Chairman: Antonis Fouskis
- Manager: Minas Pitsos
- League: Gamma Ethniki
- 2025–26: Lasithi FCA First Division, 1st (promoted)

Athlitiki Enosi Neapoli Football Club (Greek: Αθλητική Ένωση Νεάπολης) is a Greek football club, based in Neapoli, Lasithi, Crete.

== History ==
Athlitiki Enosi Neapoli was established in 1968, following the merger of local teams Driros and Koroivos from the town of Neapoli. Originally, it featured a football department that competed under the Heraklion FCA. In 1982, the Lasithi FCA was founded, with A.E. Neapoli being one of its founding member clubs.

In the 1992–93 season, the club was crowned Lasithi FCA champion for the first time and achieved promotion to the Delta Ethniki. It competed in Delta Ethniki during the 1993–94 season, when it was relegated. In 2017–18, it emerged as local champion once again and earned historic promotion to Gamma Ethniki, where it competed during the 2018–19 season. In the following 2019–20 season, it secured promotion back to Gamma Ethniki, competing there in the 2020–21 and 2021–22 seasons. During the 2023–24 season, the club won the Lasithi FCA title by narrow margins over Niki Sitia, qualifying for the FCA Champions Special Tournament, though it did not succeed in securing promotion to Gamma Ethniki. In 2024–25 season in the Lasithi FCA, A.E. Neapoli overtook O.F. Ierapetra at the top of the standings following a victory in their derby clash, mathematically securing the league title and becoming back to back champions. In the 2025–26 season, Neapolis captured the Lasithi FCA title for the third consecutive year and achieved its long-awaited return to Gamma Ethniki.

== Honours ==
=== Domestic Titles and honours ===
- Lasithi FCA champion: 6
  - 1992–93, 2017–18, 2019–20, 2023–24, 2024–25, 2025–26
- Lasithi FCA Super Cup: 2
  - 2025, 2026
