= Ethnikos Sochos F.C. =

Ethnikos Sochos FC
- Full name: Morfotikos Gymnastikos Syllogos Sochos Ethnikos
- Founded: 1957; 69 years ago
- Ground: Sochos Municipal Stadium
- Chairman: Evangelos Chatzidimitriou
- Manager: Giannis Pagonis
- League: Macedonia FCA Second Division
- 2025–26: Macedonia FCA First Division, 11th (relegated)
Home colours	Away colours

Ethnikos Sochos Football Club (Greek: Μ.Γ.Σ. Σοχού "Ο Εθνικός") is a Greek football club based in Sochos, Thessaloniki, Greece.

== Honors ==
=== Domestic ===
  - Macedonia FCA Champions: 1
    - 2019-20
  - Macedonia FCA Second Division Champions: 1
    - 2017-18
