= Giorgos Kritikos =

Greek footballer

Personal information
- Full name: Georgios Kritikos
- Date of birth: 24 August 1992 (age 34)
- Place of birth: Molos, Greece
- Height: 1.87 m (6 ft 1 1/2 in)
- Position: Centre back

Team information
- Current team: Ilioupoli
- Number: 4

Youth career
- AO Haidari

Senior career*
Years	Team	Apps	(Gls)
2009–2011	AO Haidari	13	(0)
2011–2012	P.A.O. Rouf	0	(0)
2012–2014	Atromitos Piraeus	25	(1)
2014–2017	Ionikos	76	(5)
2017–2018	Ethnikos Piraeus	0	(0)
2018–2019	Diagoras	0	(0)
2019–2021	Kallithea	18	(0)
2021–	Ilioupoli	16	(0)
- * Club domestic league appearances and goals

Giorgos Kritikos (Greek: Γιώργος Κρητικός; born 24 August 1992) is a Greek footballer, who currently plays for Super League 2 club Ilioupoli as a centre back.

He started his career with AO Haidari and played at Football League 2 and Delta Ethniki aged 17. He then played for P.A.O. Rouf and Atromitos Piraeus before he earns his transfer to Ionikos, in which he became a first team regular for three seasons. In July 2017, he transferred to Ethnikos Piraeus.
