= Nikos Milios =

Greek footballer

Personal information
- Full name: Nikolaos Milios
- Date of birth: 1 August 1995 (age 31)
- Place of birth: Greece
- Height: 1.78 m (5 ft 10 in)
- Position: Forward

Youth career
- –2011: Elpides Agrinio
- 2011–2014: Panetolikos

Senior career*
Years	Team	Apps	(Gls)
2012–2016	Panetolikos	3	(0)
2016	→ Acharnaikos (loan)	5	(0)
2016–2017	Panthrakikos	8	(0)
2017	Aiginiakos	7	(0)

International career^{‡}
2011–2012	Greece U17	3	(2)
2012– 2013	Greece U18	4	(0)
2013–2014	Greece U19	8	(0)
- * Club domestic league appearances and goals as of 16:08, 17 July 2016 (UTC) ‡ National team caps and goals as of 01:27, 14 April 2014 (UTC)

Nikos Milios (Greek: Νίκος Μήλιος; born 1 August 1995) is a Greek professional footballer.

== Youth career ==
Milios began his career with Elpides Agrinio. He signed with the youth club of Panetolikos on 11 July 2011.

== Club career ==
=== Panetolikos ===
Milios signed a professional contract with Panetolikos in August 2012.

Milios made his first-team debut on 13 April 2014, playing against OFI for the 2013–14 Super League Greece.

On 22 January 2016, Panetolikos announced that Milios was going on a six-month loan to Acharnaikos

=== Panthrakikos ===
On 22 August 2016, Milios signed a contract with Panthrakikos.
