= Megas Alexandros Trikala F.C. =

Megas Alexandros Trikala
- Full name: Athlitikos Omilos Megas Alexandros Trikala Imathias
- Founded: 1965; 61 years ago
- Ground: Trikala Imathia Municipal Stadium
- Chairman: Dimitris Simpseris
- Manager: Sakis Paggouras
- League: Imathia FCA First Division
- 2025–26: Imathia FCA First Division, 3rd
Home colours	Away colours

Megas Alexandros Trikala Football Club (Greek: Α.Ο. Μέγας Αλέξανδρος Τρικάλων Ημαθίας) is a Greek football club, based in Trikala, Imathia, Greece

== Honours ==
=== Domestic ===
  - Imathia FCA Champions: 4
    - 1981–82, 1997–98, 2016–17, 2018–19
  - Imathia FCA Cup Winners: 1
    - 2004–05
