= Kavala =

City in Macedonia, Greece

Kavala Καβάλα
- Municipality
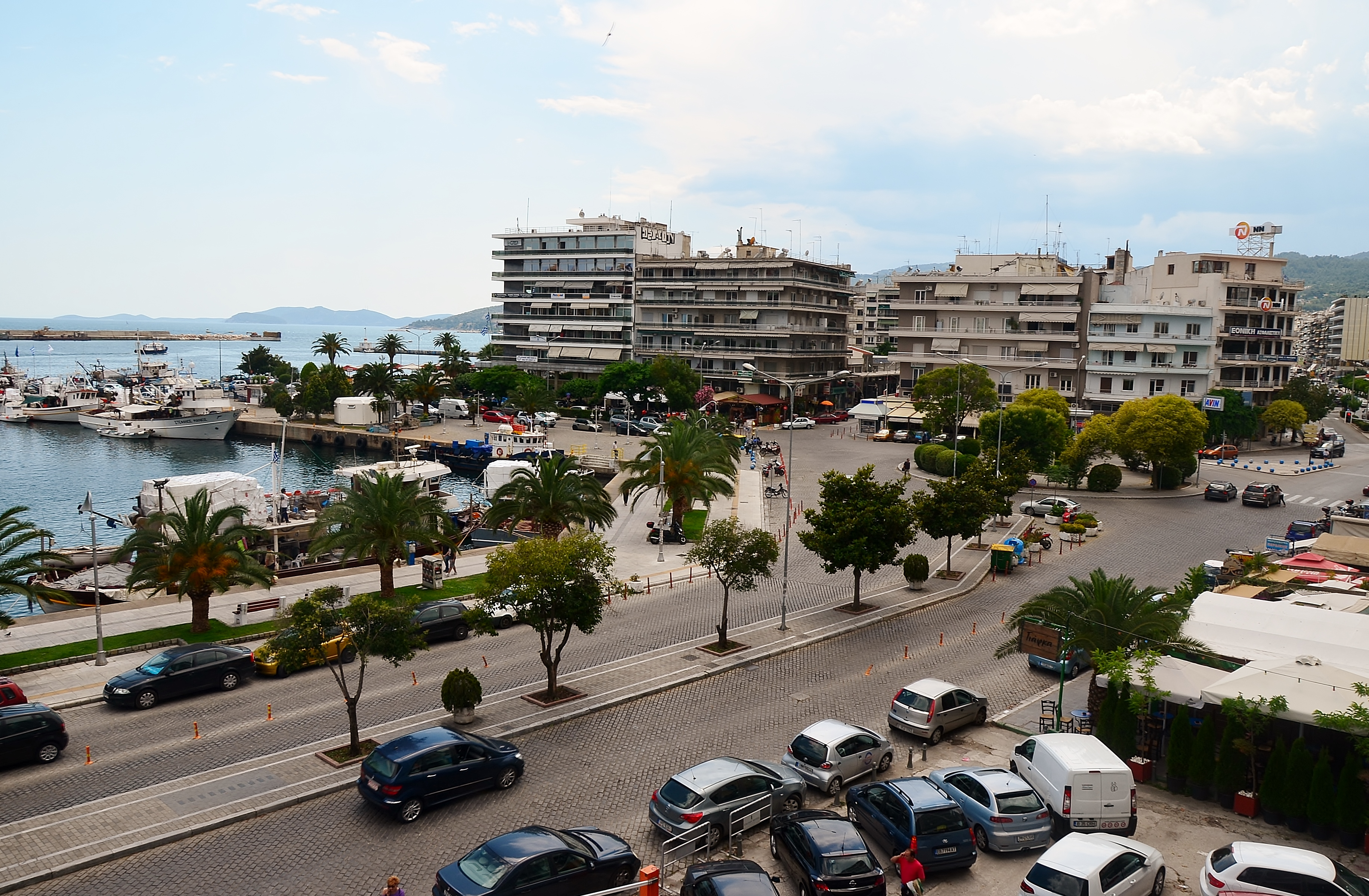
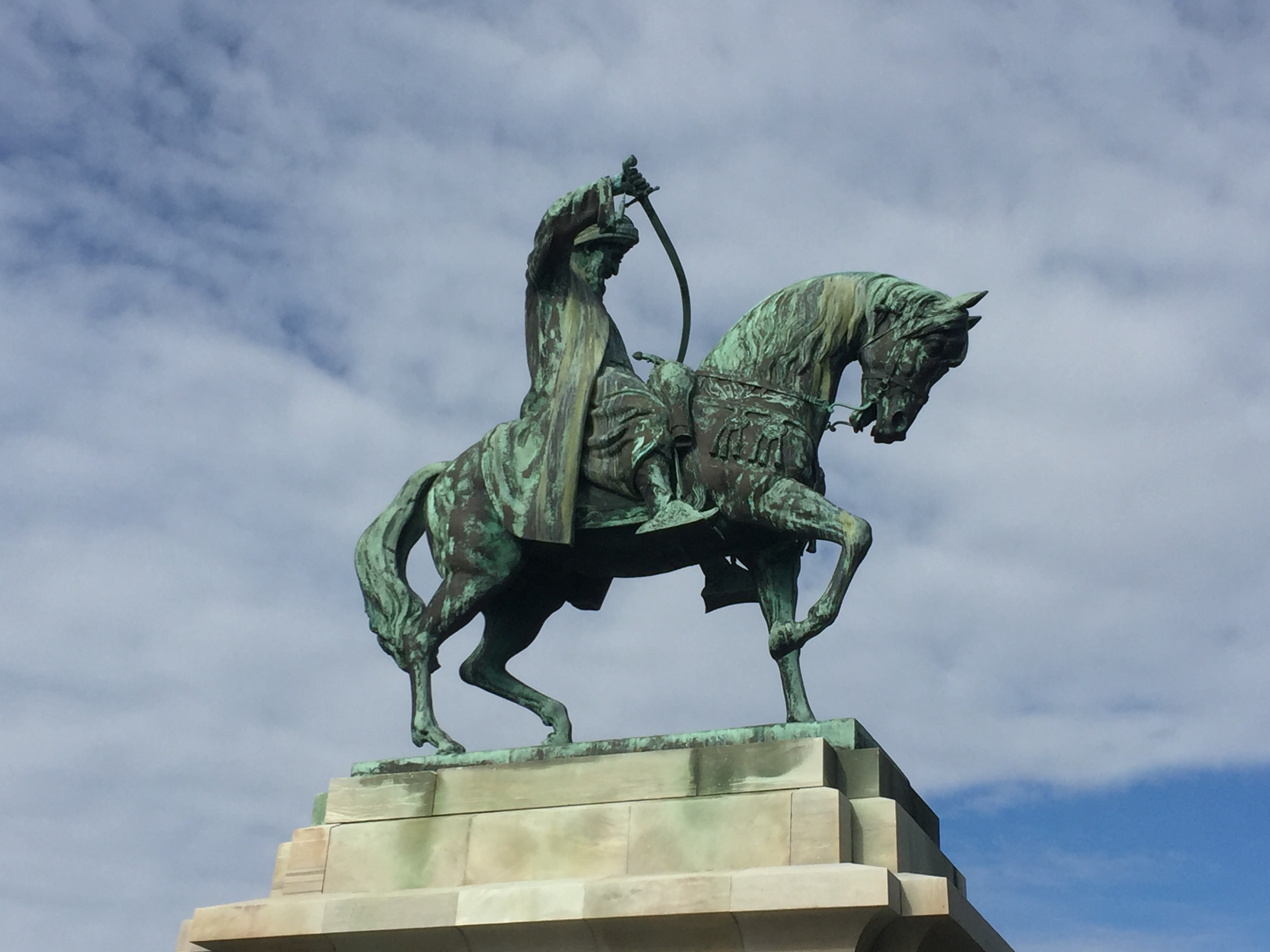
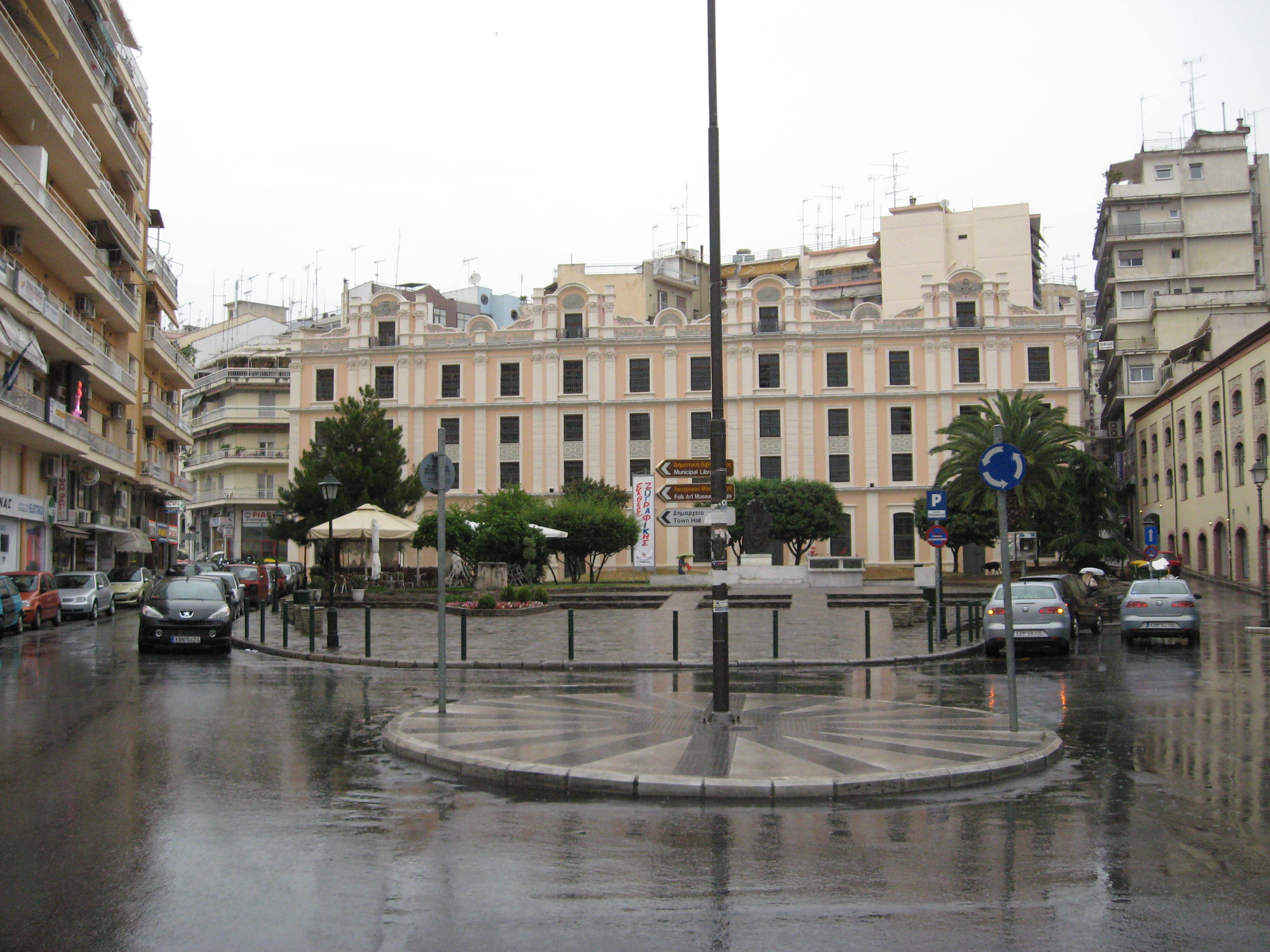
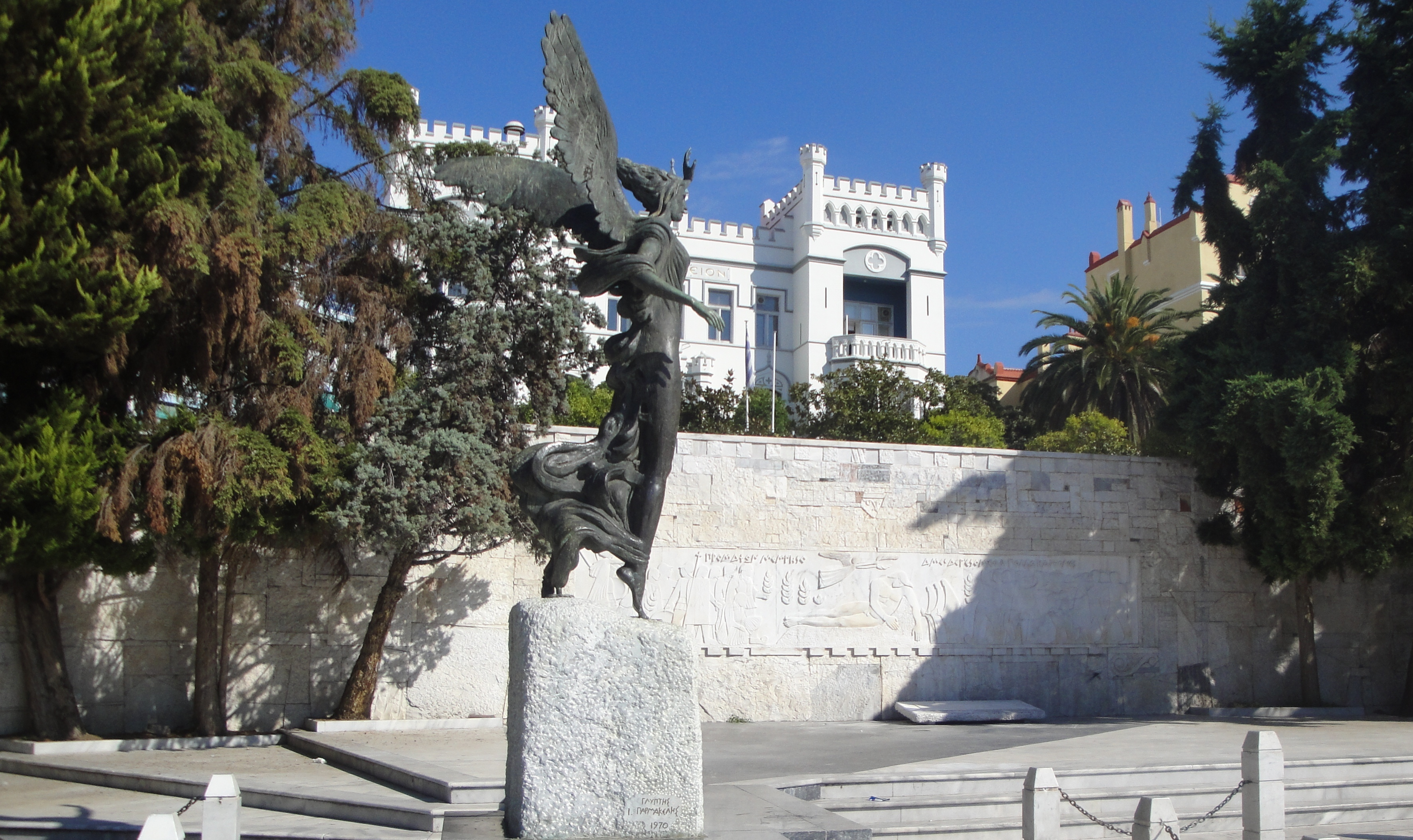
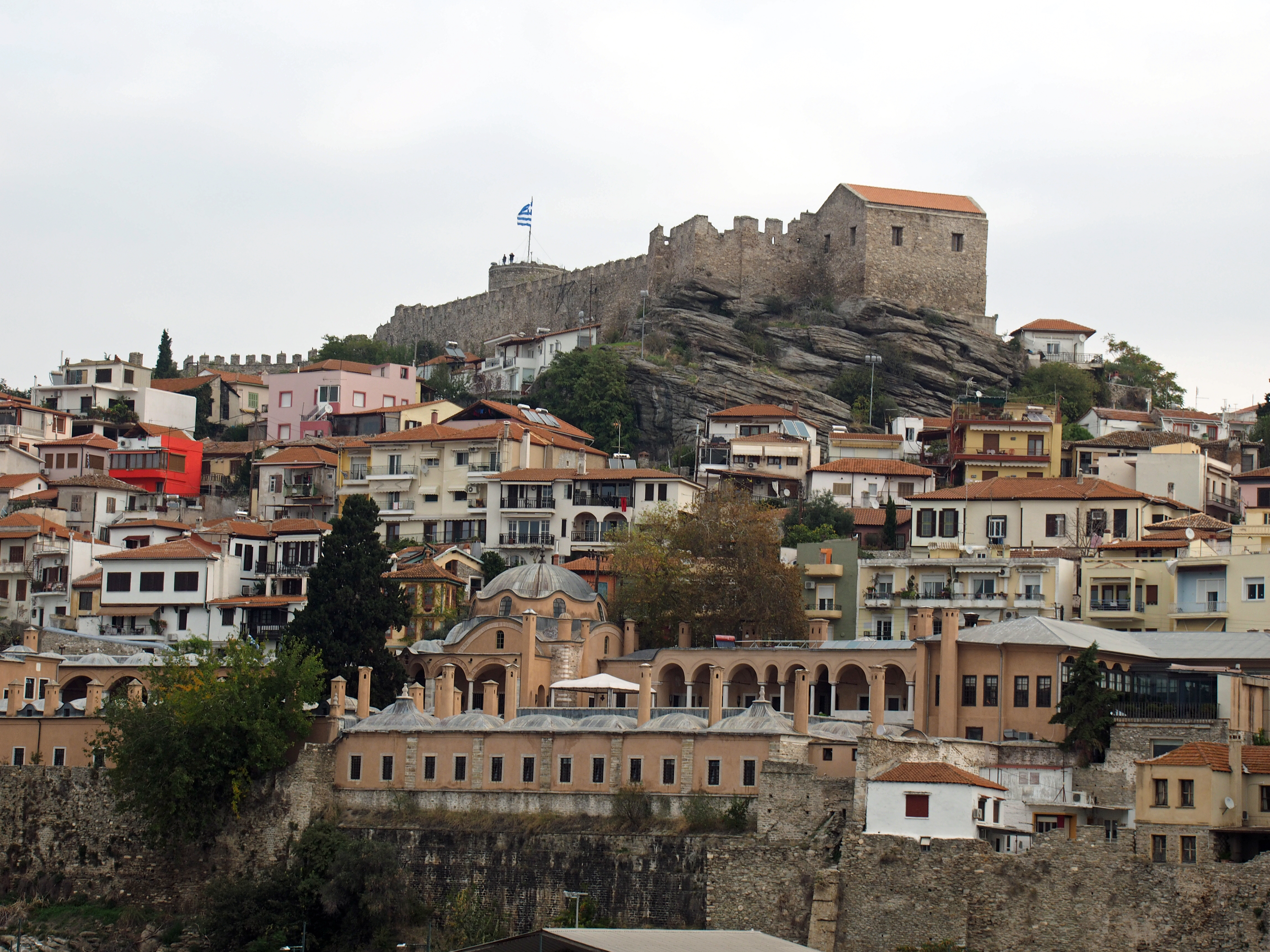
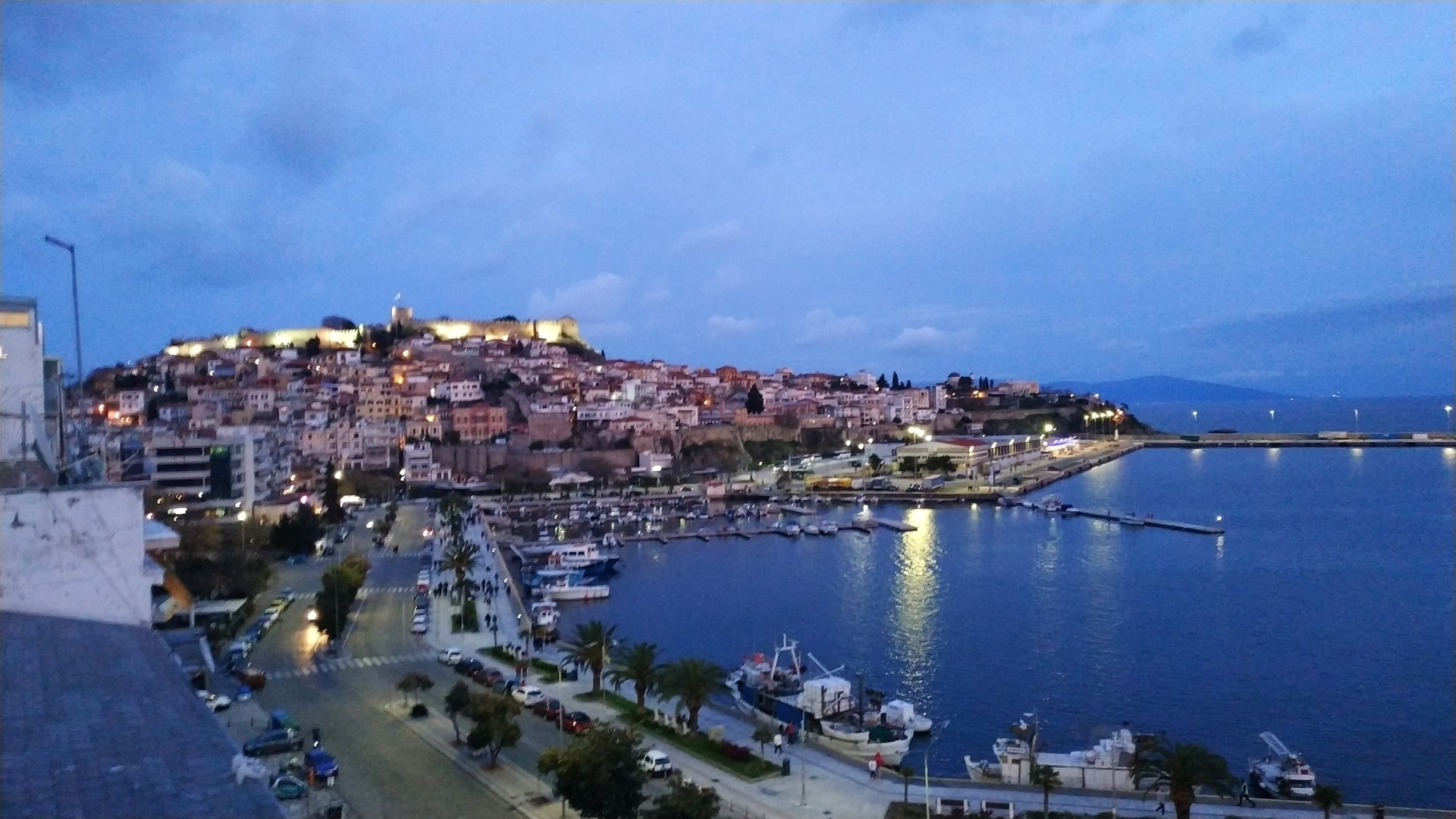
- From top left: View of Kavala promenade, monument of Muhammad Ali, Tobacco Worker's Square, memorial to the fallen warrior with the city hall in the background, Imaret Hotel and the Kavala Fortress, view of the city's port.

- Location within Greece
- Coordinates: 40°56′N 24°24′E
- Country: Greece
- Geographic region: Macedonia
- Administrative region: Eastern Macedonia and Thrace
- Regional unit: Kavala

Government
  - Mayor: Theodoros Mouriadis (PASOK-KINAL; since 2019)

Area
  - Municipality: 351.4 km^{2} (135.7 sq mi)
  - Municipal unit: 112.6 km^{2} (43.5 sq mi)
- Highest elevation: 53 m (174 ft)
- Lowest elevation: 0 m (0 ft)

Population (2021)
  - Municipality: 66,376
  - Density: 188.9/km^{2} (489.2/sq mi)
  - Municipal unit: 56,243
  - Municipal unit density: 499.5/km^{2} (1,294/sq mi)
  - Community: 54,065
- Time zone: UTC+2 (EET)
  - Summer (DST): UTC+3 (EEST)
- Postal code: 65x xx
- Area code: 2510
- Vehicle registration: KB
- Website: kavala.gov.gr

Kavala (Greek: Καβάλα, Kavála [kaˈvala]) is a city in northern Greece, the principal seaport of eastern Macedonia and the capital of Kavala regional unit.

It is situated on the Bay of Kavala, across from the island of Thasos and on the A2 motorway, a one-and-a-half-hour drive to Thessaloniki (160 kilometres (99 miles) west) and a forty-minute drive to Drama (37 km (23 miles) north) and Xanthi (56 km (35 miles) east). It is also about 150 kilometers west of Alexandroupoli.

Kavala is an important economic centre of Northern Greece, a center of commerce, tourism, fishing and oil-related activities and formerly a thriving trade in tobacco.

== Names ==
Historically the city is known by several names. In antiquity the name of the city was Neapolis ('new city', like many Greek colonies). In the Early Middle Ages it was renamed to Christo(u)polis ('city of Christ') and from the 16th century and on to Kavala.

== Etymology ==
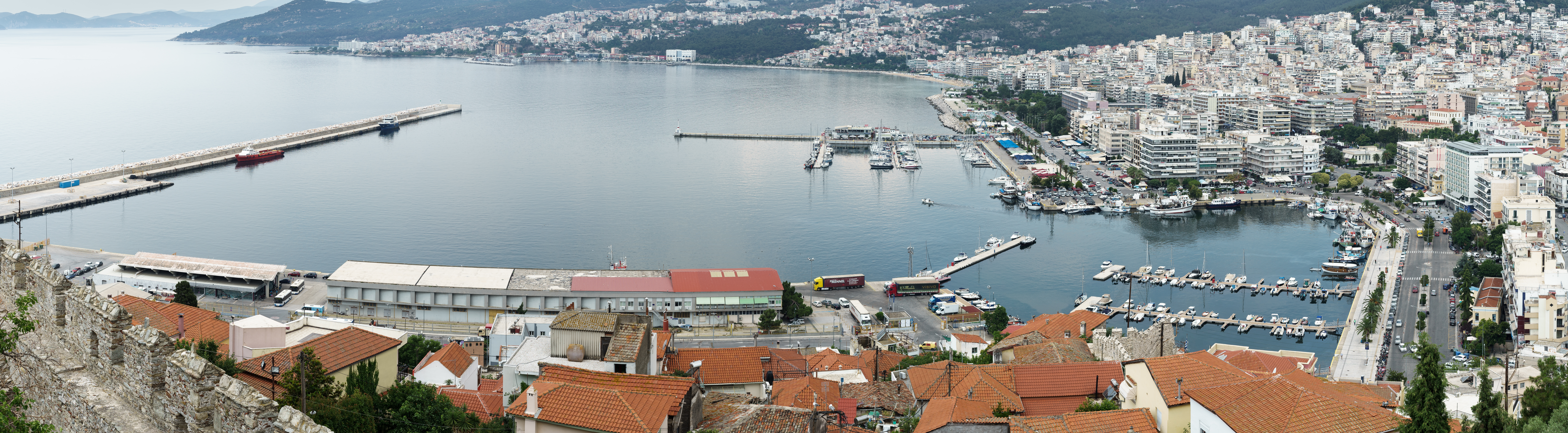
Panorama of the city centre and harbour

The etymology of the modern name of the city is disputed. Some mention an ancient Greek settlement of Skavala near the town. Others propose that the name is derived from the Italian cavallo which means horse. The city is situated on the ancient route of Via Egnatia; hence Cavala designated "the horses" (cavalla) where imperial couriers changed horses. The French traveller Bellon, who visited Kavala in 1547, mentions a local tradition that the city initially took its name from Alexander the Great, who named it "Bukephala", after the name of his horse Bucephalus. Another possibility is that "Kavala" is a Turkish name, given by the Turks after they refounded the city at the beginning of the 16th century. Last but not least, as the archaeologist Georgios Bakalakis first pointed out, there was a Byzantine fortress named Kavala close to the Byzantine city of Iconium – now Konya – in Asia Minor. When the Ottomans brought Muslim settlers from Iconium to establish in the territory of Kavala at the beginning of the 16th century, these people brought the name of their homeland with them. Nowadays the city's nickname is "the cyan city" (Η γαλάζια πόλη) and the symbol of the municipality of Kavala is the head of goddess Parthenos, the patron goddess of ancient Neapolis, as depicted in the coinage of the ancient Greek city.

== History ==
=== Antiquity ===
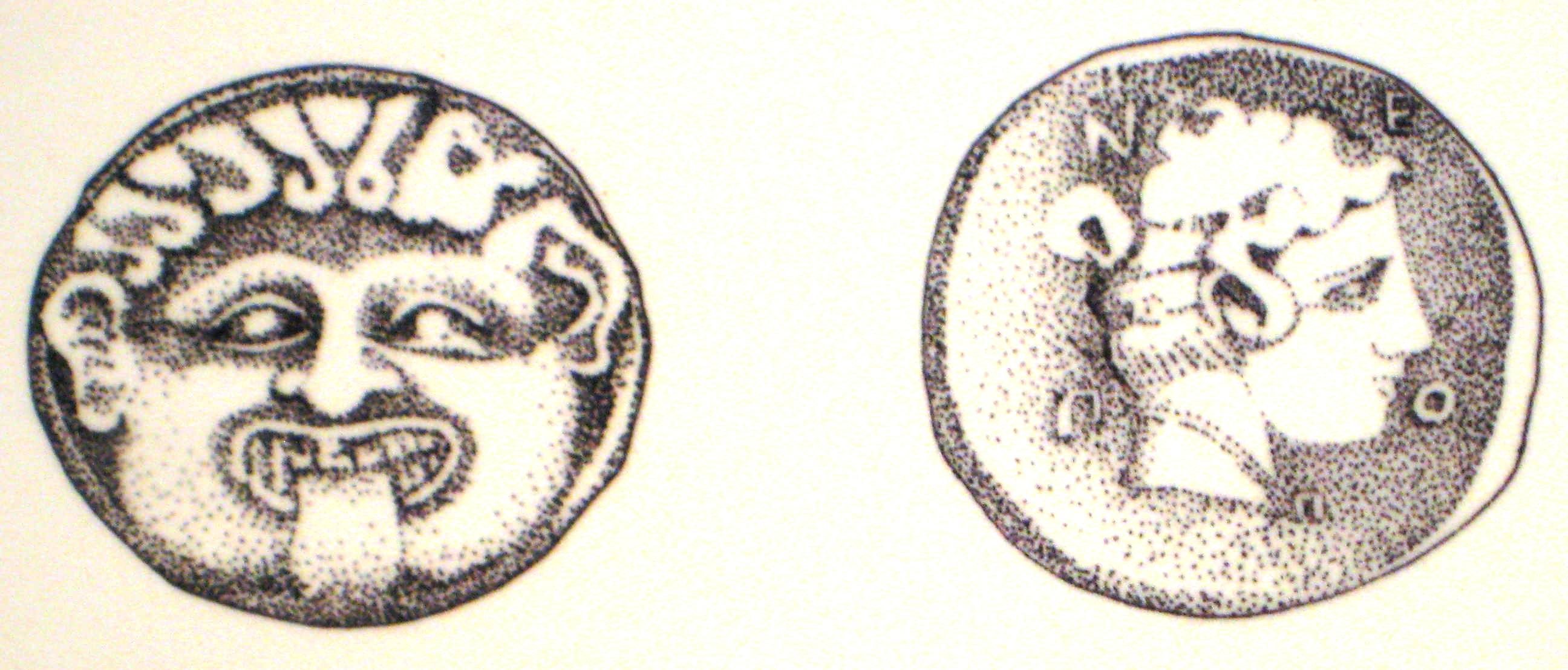
Silver coins of Neapolis, with depictions of Gorgon and the head of Parthenos, patron deity of ancient Neapolis (465–455 BC)

Kavala is a historic northern Greek port that has served as a vital gateway for travellers and merchants between Europe and the Middle East since antiquity.

The city was founded in the late 7th century BC by settlers from Thassos. It was one of several Thassian colonies along the coastline, all founded in order to take advantage of rich gold and silver mines, especially those located in the nearby Pangaion mountain (which were eventually exploited by Phillip II of Macedonia).

Worship of Parthenos/Virgin, a female deity of Greek Ionian origin associated with Athena, is archaeologically attested in the Archaic period. At the end of the 6th century BC Neapolis claimed independence from Thassos and began issuing its own silver coins with the head of Gorgo (γοργὀνειο) on one side. A few decades later a large Ionic temple made from Thassian marble replaced the Archaic one. Parts of it can now be seen in the town's archaeological museum.

In 411 BC, during the Peloponnesian War, Neapolis was besieged by the allied armies of the Spartans and the Thassians but remained faithful to Athens. Two Athenian honorary decrees in 410 and 407 BC rewarded Neapolis for its loyalty.

Neapolis was a town of Macedonia, located 14 km (9 mi) from the harbour of Philippi. It was a member of the Second Athenian League; a pillar found in Athens mentions the contribution of Neapolis to the alliance.

The town was later conquered by the Kingdom of Macedonia.

=== Roman and Byzantine Era ===
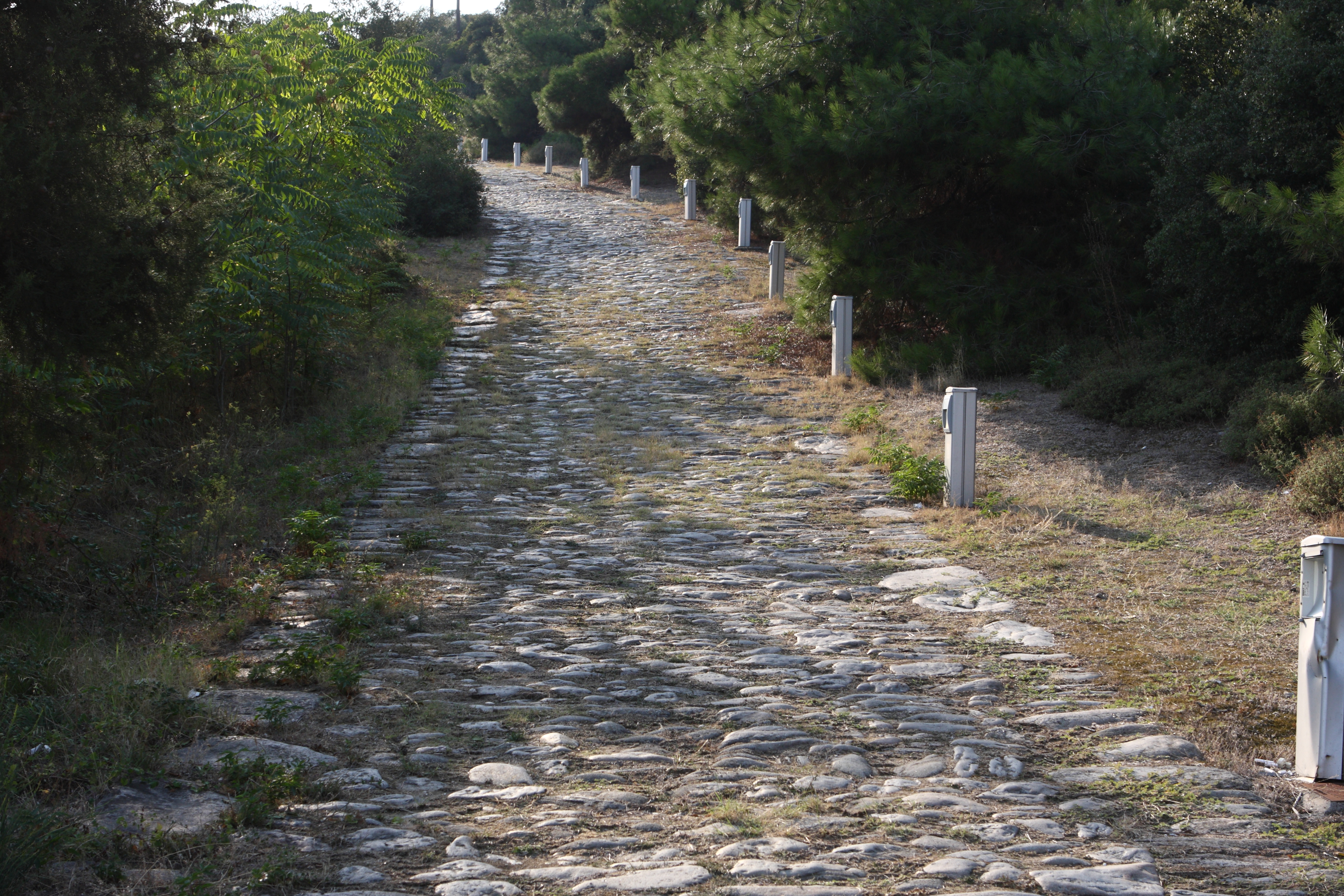
Via Egnatia in Kavala

The military Roman road Via Egnatia passed through the city and helped commerce to flourish. It became a Roman civitas in 168 BC, and was a base for Brutus and Cassius in 42 BC, before their defeat in the Battle of Philippi.

The Apostle Paul landed at Neapolis during his first voyage to Europe.

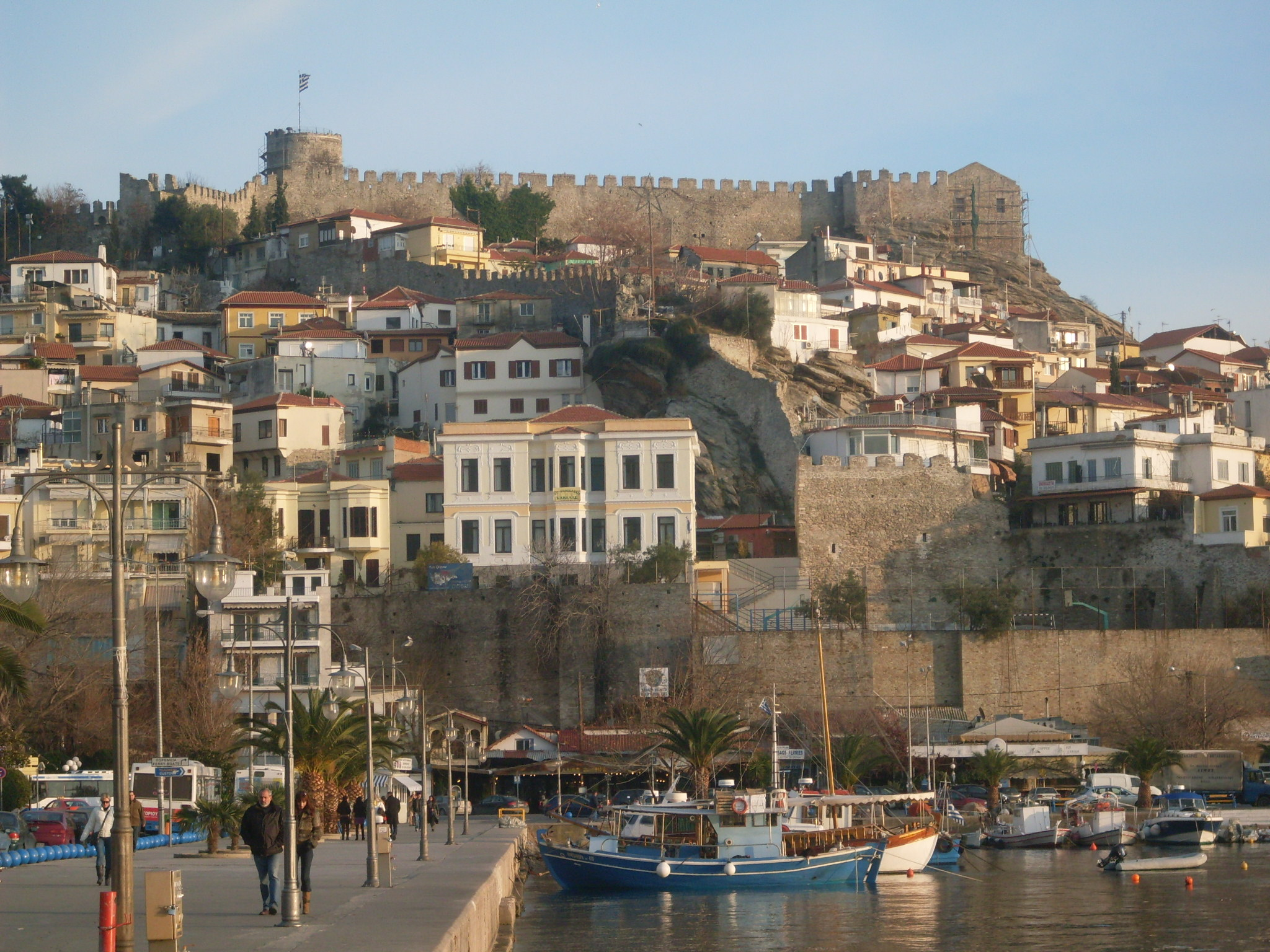
View of the old town, with the fortress of Kavala in the background

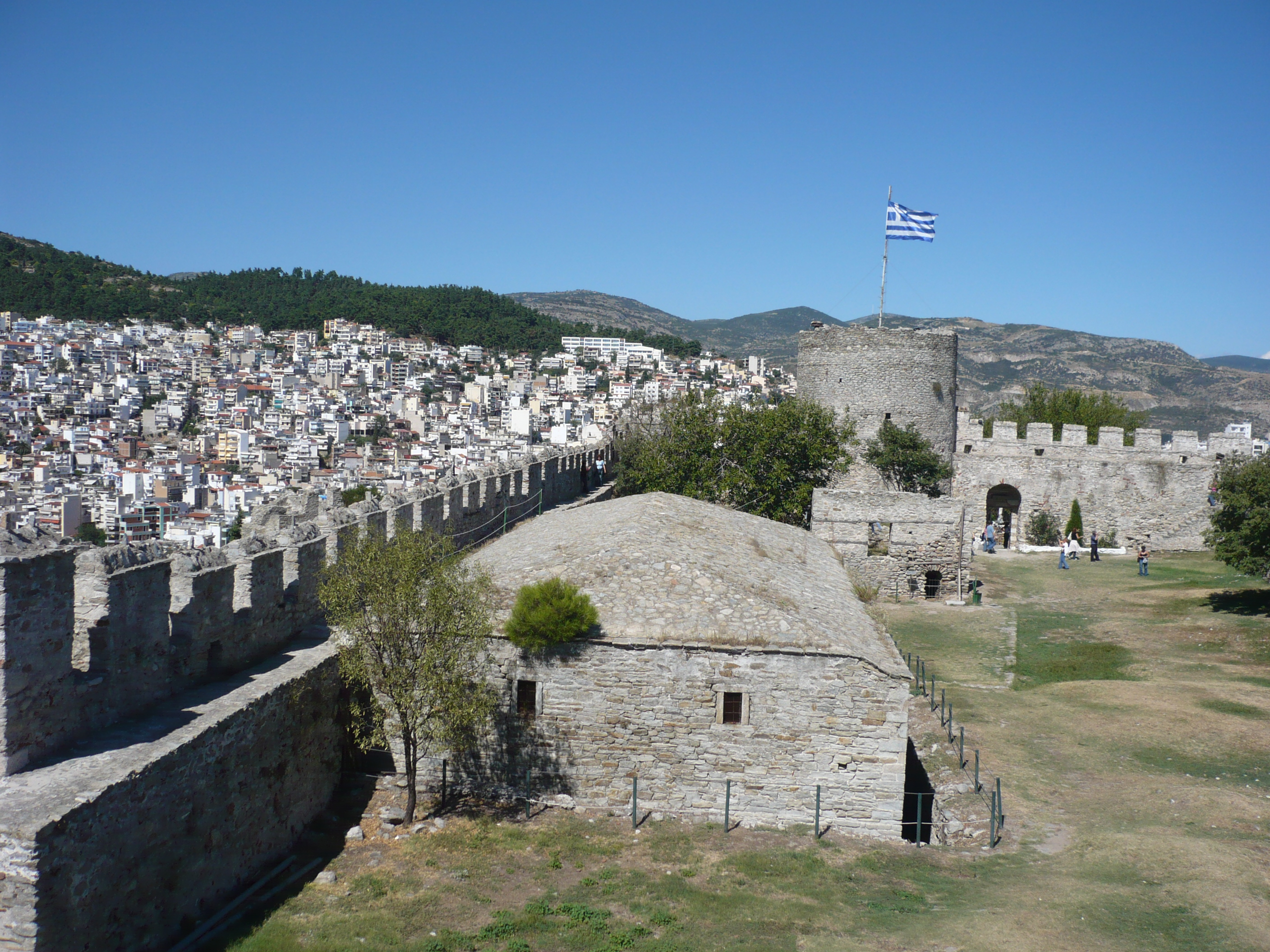
The arsenal and the food storage in the castle

In the 6th century, Byzantine emperor Justinian I fortified the city in an effort to protect it from barbarian raids. In later Byzantine times the city was called "Christo(u)polis" (Χριστούπολις, "city of Christ"), and belonged initially to the theme of Macedonia and later to the theme of Strymon. The first surviving mention of the new name is in a taktikon of the early 9th century. The city is also mentioned in the "Life of St. Gregory of Dekapolis". In the 8th and 9th centuries, Bulgarian attacks forced the Byzantines to reorganise the defence of the area, giving great care to Christoupolis with fortifications and a notable garrison. The city remained under Byzantine control and in 837 Byzantine armed forces from Christoupolis under the command of Caesar Alexius Moselie stopped Bulgarian raids in the plain of Philippoi.

At about 830–840 AD dates a Greek inscription on the walls of a defensive tower of the fortifications of the city, still visible today, and in 926, according to another inscription (nowadays in the archaeological museum of Kavala), the General of the theme of Strymon, Vasilios Klaudon, restored the "fallen and damaged" defensive walls.

In the mid of the 12th century the Arab geographer Edrisi visited Christoupolis and described it as a well fortified city and a center of sea trade. According to another inscription, also nowadays in the archaeological museum of Kavala, the Normans probably burnt the city in 1185, after they captured first Thessaloniki. Some years later, the city fell to the hands of the Lombards, after the Fourth Crusade and was liberated again by the leader of the state of Epirus, Theodorus Komnenos, in 1225.

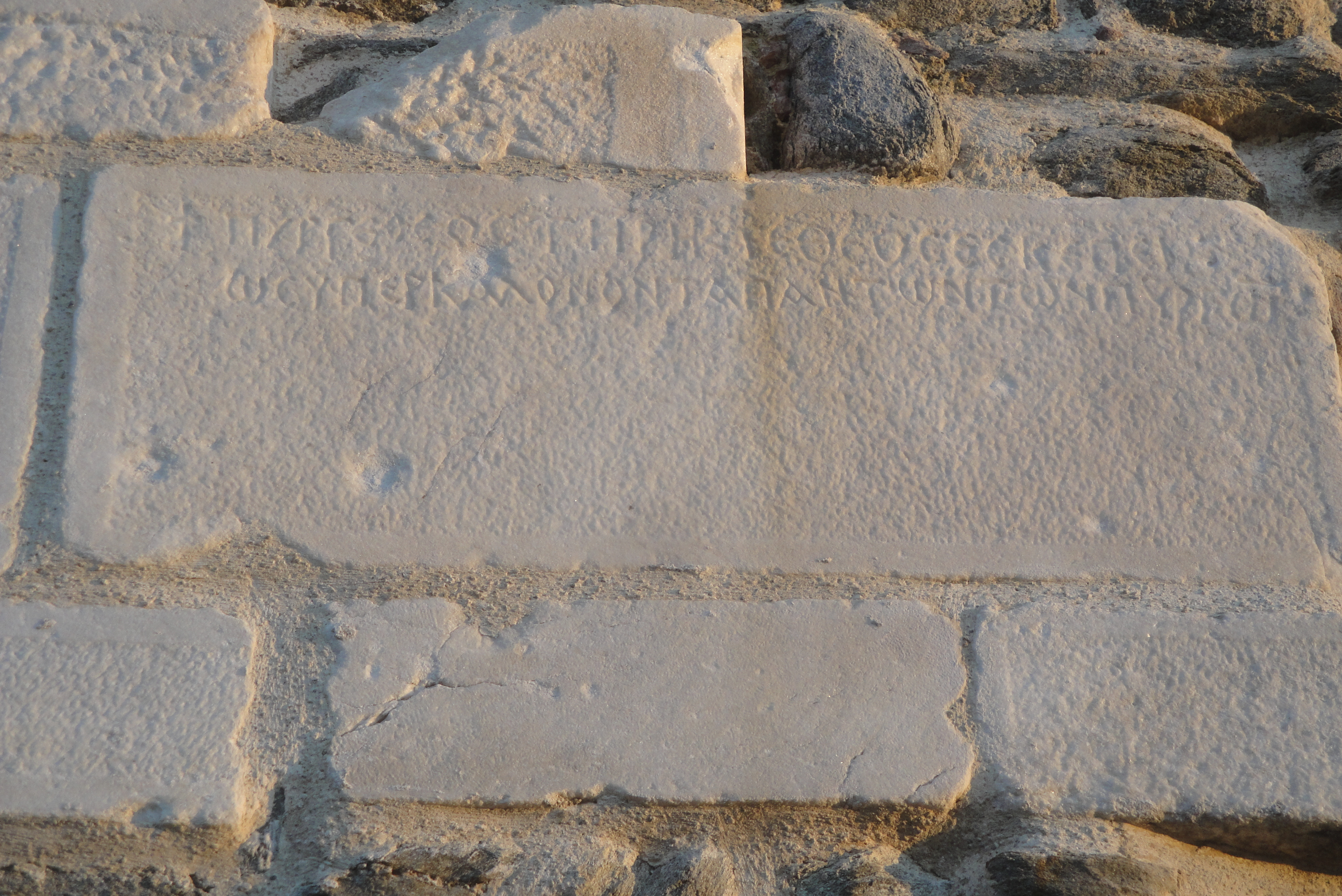
Byzantine inscription from a tower of Christoupolis, 830–840 AD

In 1302, the Catalans failed to capture the city. To prevent them from coming back, the Byzantine emperor Andronikos III Palaiologos built a new long defensive wall. In 1357 two Byzantine officers and brothers, Alexios and John, controlled the city and its territory. Excavations have revealed the ruins of an early Byzantine basilica under an Ottoman mosque in the Old Town. It was used until the late Byzantine era.

=== Ottoman Era ===
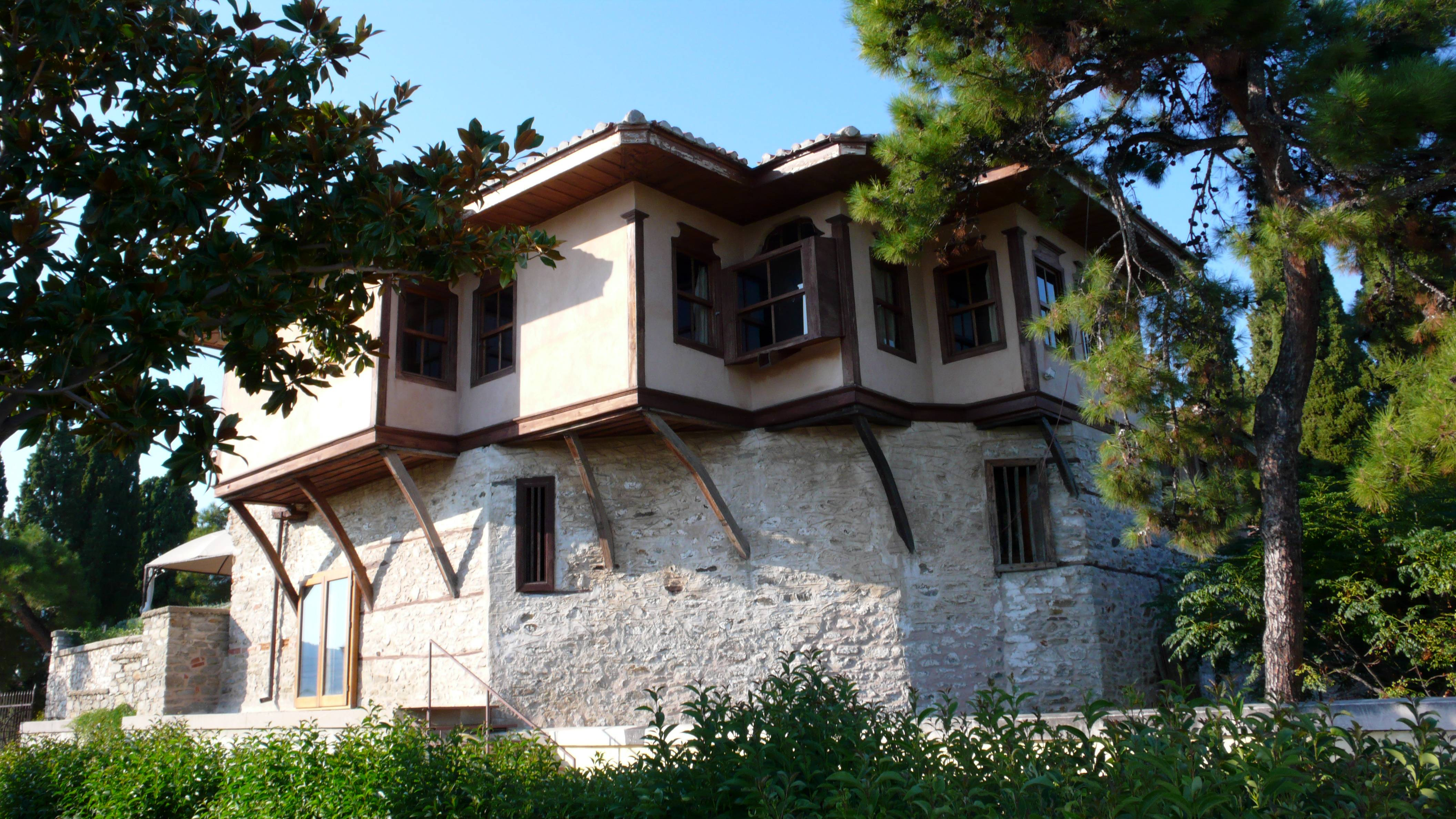
Residence of Muhammad Ali of Egypt

The Ottoman Empire first captured the city in 1387. Kavala remained a part of the Ottoman Empire until 1912. In 1519 (Hijri 925) the town was directly owned by the Sultan as a hass, and had 22 Muslim and 61 Christian households. In the 16th century, Ibrahim Pasha, Grand Vizier of Suleiman the Magnificent, contributed to the town's prosperity and growth by reconstructing the late Roman (1st – 6th century AD) aqueduct. The Ottomans also extended the Byzantine fortress on the hill of Panagia. Both landmarks are among the most recognizable symbols of the city today.

Muhammad Ali, the founder of a dynasty that ruled Egypt, moved with his family from Albania to Kavala in the Rumelia Eyalet when he was young. His father, an Albanian tobacco and shipping merchant, served as an Ottoman commander of a small unit in Kavala. Muhammad Ali emerged as an Ottoman commander in this city before establishing his dynasty in Egypt. His house has been preserved as a museum.

Famous for its Ottoman architecture, the town was the first European port of call for merchants and travellers from the Middle East.

=== 20th century ===
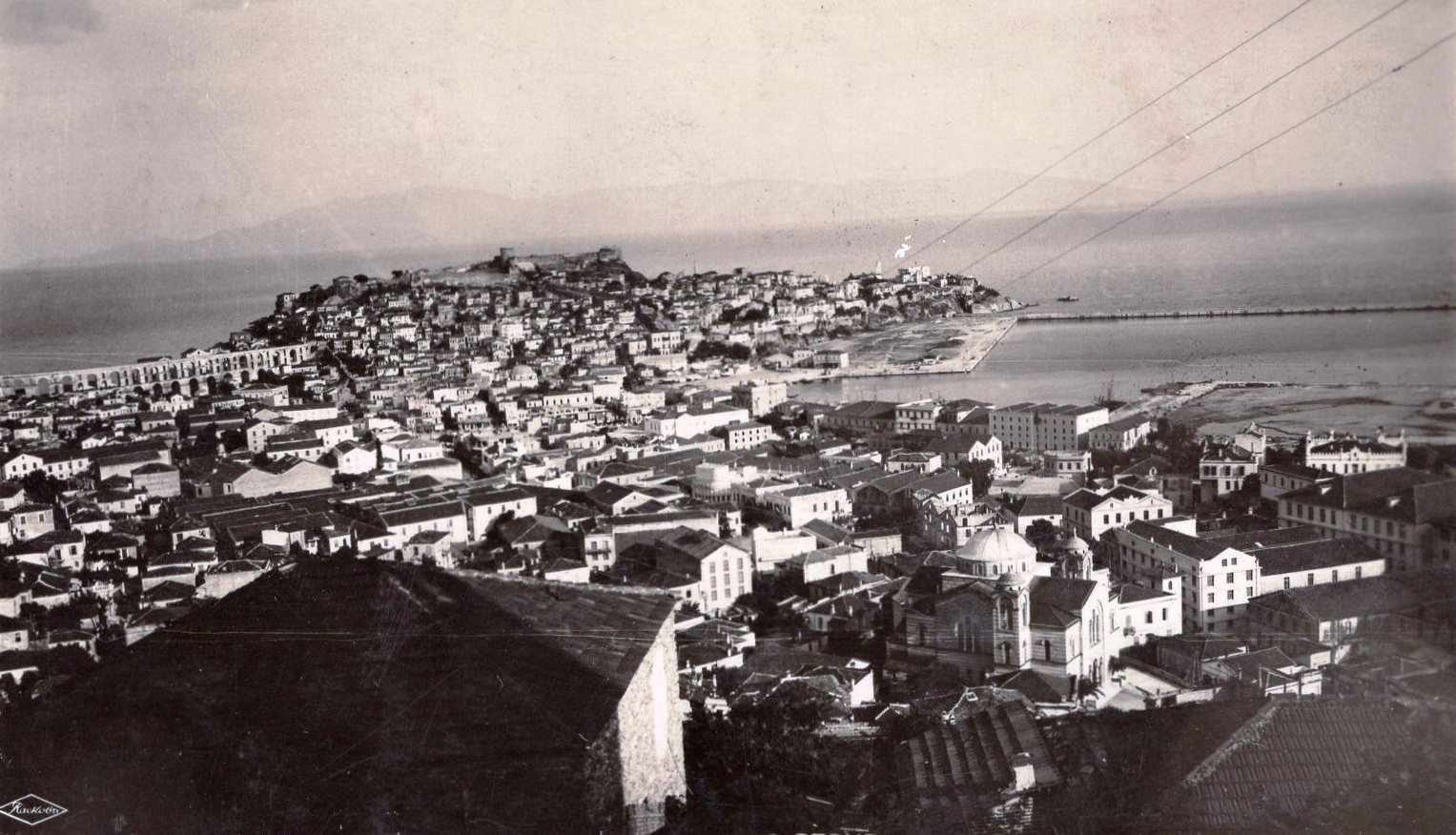
Kavala in 1942

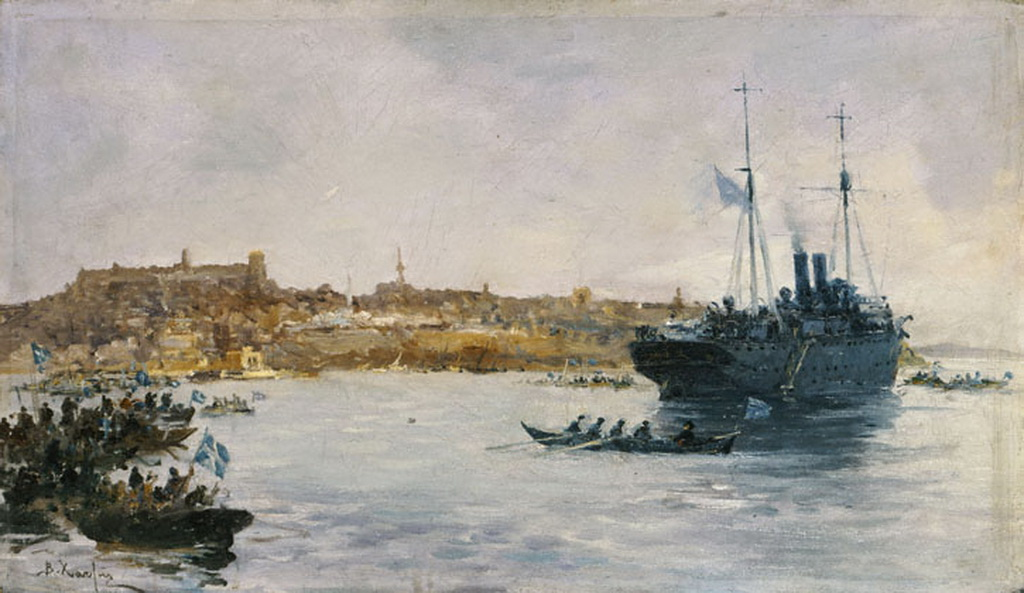
The landing of Greek troops in Kavala by Vasileios Hatzis

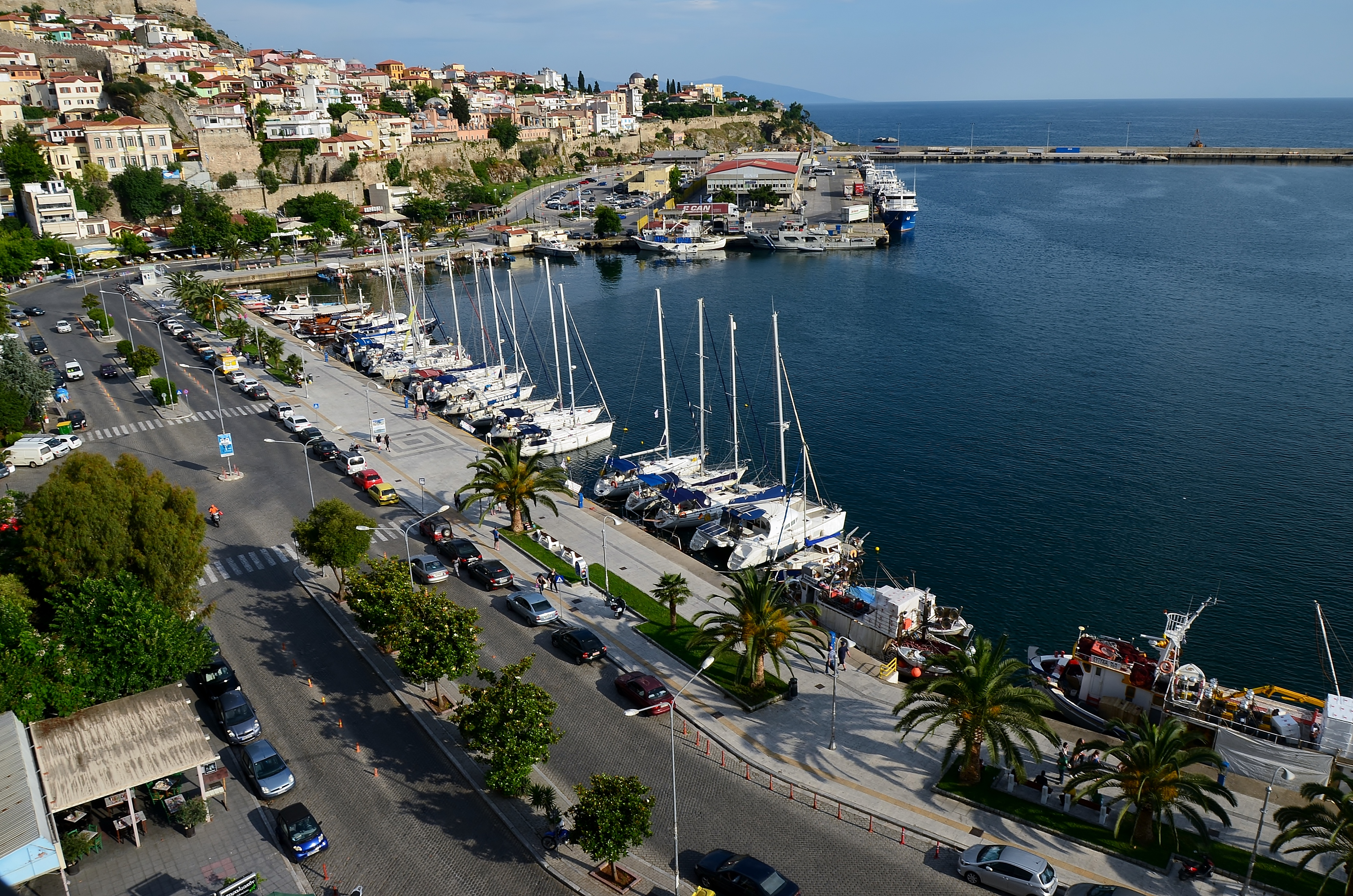
View of the marina at the seafront

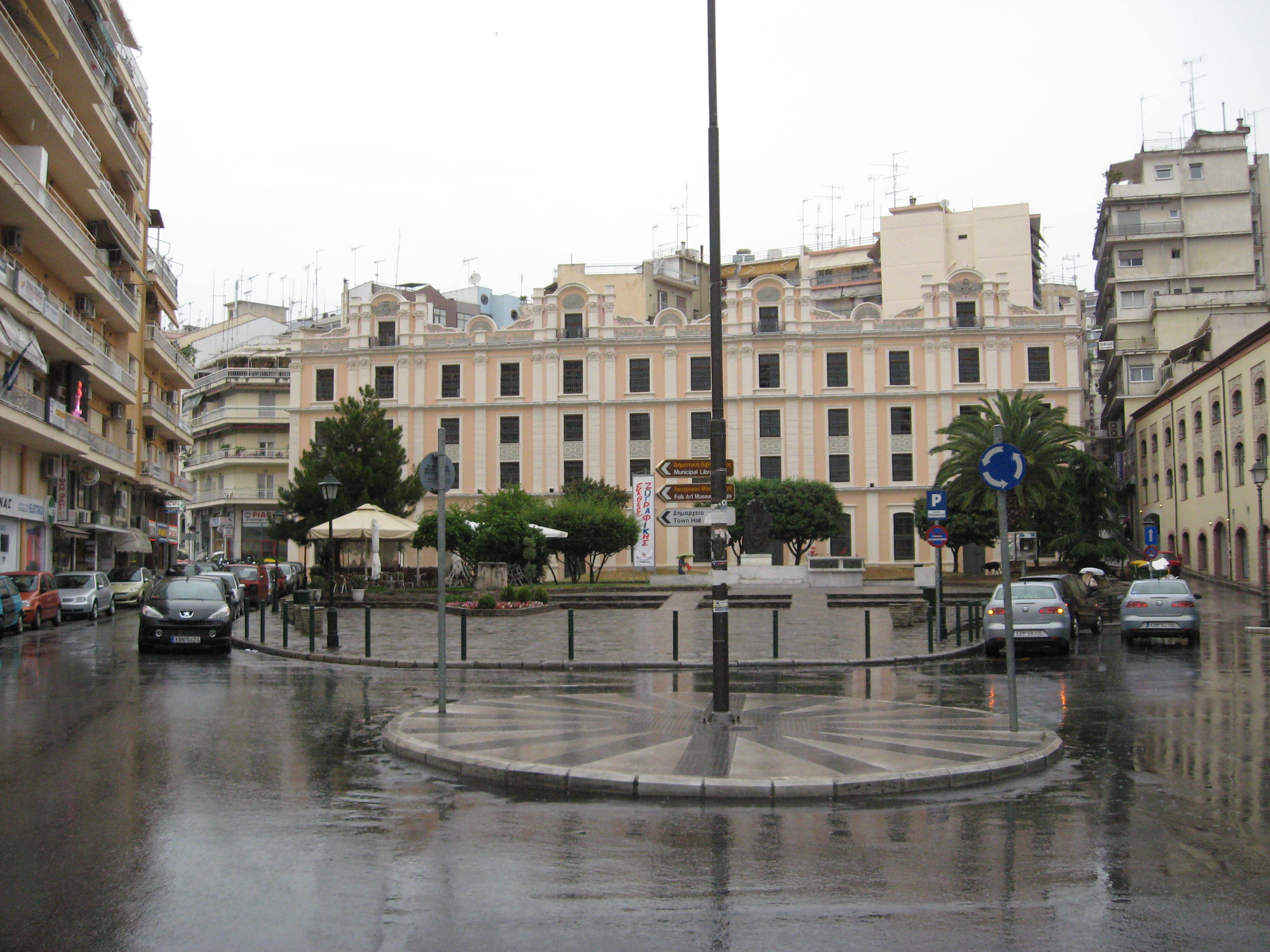
Central part of the city, Kapnergati Square

Kavala was captured by the Bulgarian Army in the First Balkan War and then captured again by the Greek Navy during the Second Balkan War and was incorporated into Greece with the Treaty of Bucharest. In August 1916 remnants of the IV Army Corps, stationed at Kavala under Ioannis Hatzopoulos surrendered to the advancing Bulgarian army. These events provoked a military revolt in Thessaloniki, which led to the establishment of the Provisional Government of National Defence, and eventually Greece's entry into the First World War.

The Bulgarian occupation of the city lasted from August 1916 until September 1918. Hundreds of victims and eye-witnesses testified about the Bulgarian atrocities in the post-war inter-Allied interrogatory committee, which finally gave its report on 21 April 1919, after in situ examination of the circumstances.

After the Greco-Turkish War of 1919–1922, the city entered a new era of prosperity because of the labor offered by the thousands of refugees that moved to the area from Anatolia. The development was both industrial and agricultural. Kavala became greatly involved and developed further in the processing and trading of tobacco. Many buildings related to the storage and processing of tobacco from that era are preserved in the city. During the Interwar period and the Second Hellenic Republic, Kavala was the 4th largest city in Greece (after Athens, Thessaloniki, and Patras). In 1934 Dimitrios Partsalidis was elected mayor of Kavala, the first communist mayor in modern Greek history. The city gained temporarily by the Press, the nickname "Little Moscow".

During the Second World War and after the Battle of Greece, Bulgaria occupied the city again, following the German invasion (April 1941). During the Bulgarian occupation (1941–1944), almost the entire Jewish community of the city was deported, turned over to German authorities and exterminated in the Treblinka death camp as part of the Holocaust.

Following the years after the Second World War, the city faced economic decline and emigration.

In the late 1950s, Kavala expanded towards the sea by reclaiming land from the area west of the port.

In 1967, King Constantine II left Athens for Kavala in an unsuccessful attempt to launch a counter-coup against the military junta.

=== 21st century ===
On 16 July 2022, Meridian Flight 3032 crashed nearby. The Ukrainian-registered Antonov An-12BK was carrying 11.5 tons of ammunition from Niš to Dhaka when the plane began to lose altitude over the Aegean and turned around, but went down 35 kilometers west of Kavala Airport. All 8 crew members were killed.

== Historical population ==
Year	Town	Municipal unit	Municipality
1961	44,517	44,978	–
1971	46,234	46,887	–
1981	56,375	56,705	–
1991	56,571	58,025	–
2001	58,663	63,293	–
2011	54,027	58,790	70,501
2021	51,947	56,243	66,376

== Administration ==
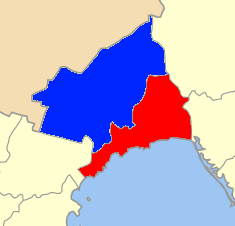
Municipal units (former municipalities): Kavala Filippoi

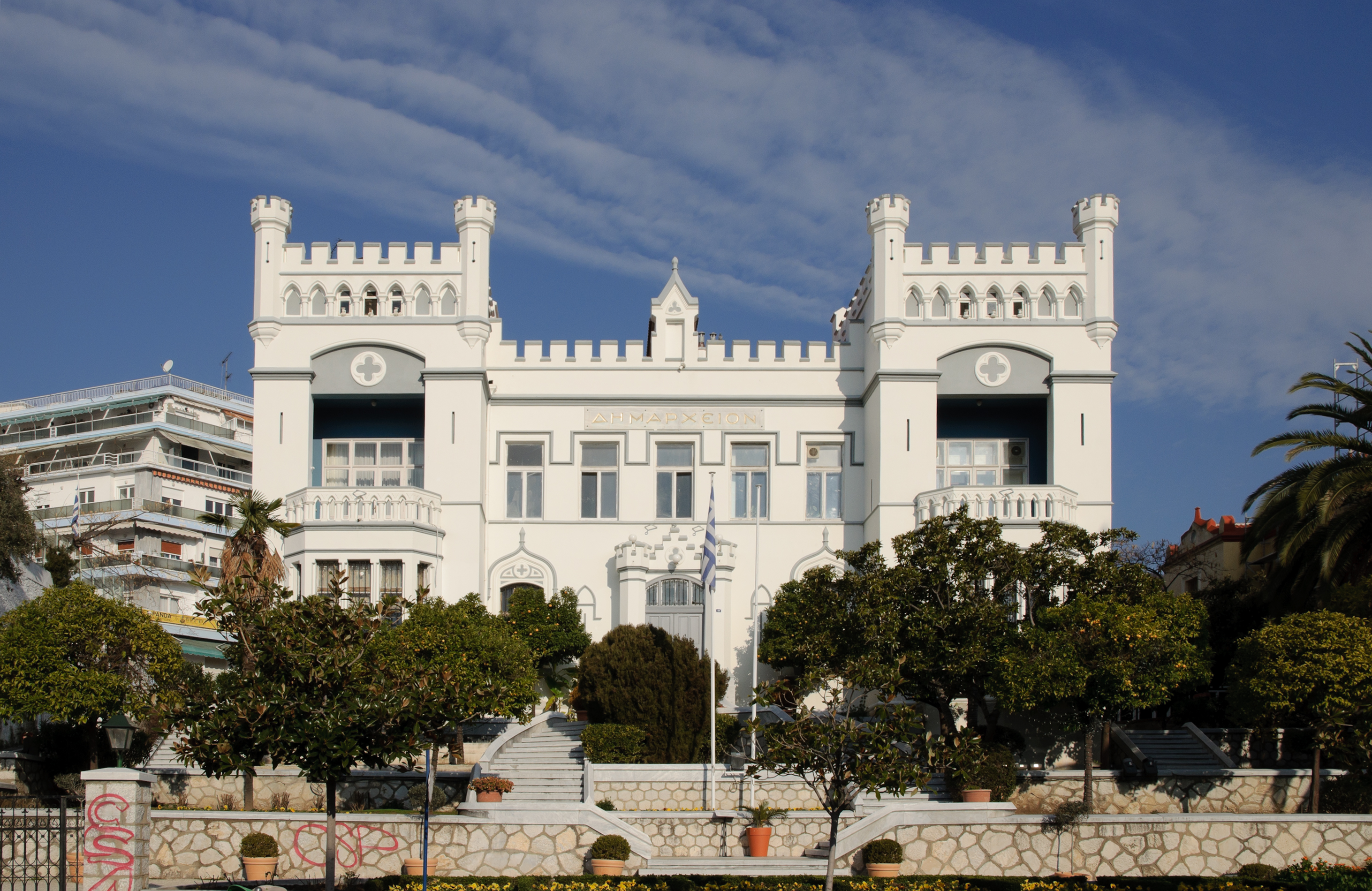
The city hall, old mansion of tobacco trader Herzog

=== Municipality ===
The municipality of Kavala was formed at the 2011 local government reform by the merger of the two former municipalities, which became municipal units:

Municipal unit	Population (2011)	Population (2021)	Area (km^{2})
Kavala	58,790	56,243	112.599
Filippoi	11,711	10,133	238.751

The municipality has an area of 351.35 square kilometres (135.66 square miles). The population of the new municipality was 70,501 in 2011. Based on the 2021 census the population is 66,376 . The seat of the municipality is in Kavala. Some of the most important communities inside new municipality are:

Community	Population
Kavala	56,371
Krinides	3,365
Amygdaleonas	2,724
Nea Karvali	2,225
Zygos	2,057

=== Subdivisions (districts) ===
Kavala is built amphitheatrically, with most residents enjoying superb views of the coast and sea. Some of the areas inside Kavala are:

Agia Varvara	Agios Athanasios	Agios Ioannis	Agios Loukas	Chilia
Dexameni	Kalamitsa	Kentro (Centre)	Neapolis	Panagia
Perigiali	Potamoudia	Profitis Ilias	Timios Stavros	Vyronas

=== Main streets ===
- Poulidou Street
- Ethikis Antistaseos Avenue
- Omonoias Street
- Pipinou
- Katsoni
- Votsi
- Kimonos
- Dragoumi
- Drakontos
- Viktoros Hugo
- Konstantinidi
- Komninon
- Kountourioti
- Ermionis
- Filikis Eterias
- Venizelou
- Anthemiou

== International relations ==
=== Twin towns – sister cities ===
Kavala is twinned with:

- Gabrovo, Bulgaria (1975)
- Varna, Bulgaria
- Gradiška, Bosnia and Herzegovina (1994)
- Nuremberg, Germany (1998)
- (United States) Durham, North Carolina, US (2017)

=== Partnerships ===
- Agadir, Morocco (2001)
- Martuni, Armenia (2001)
- Termini Imerese, Italy (2001)
- Tekirdağ, Turkey (2003)
- Gotse Delchev, Bulgaria (2003)
- Vranje, Serbia (2009)
- Nevsky District of St. Petersburg, Russia (2016)

=== Province ===
The province of Kavala (Greek: Επαρχία Καβάλας) was one of the provinces of the Kavala Prefecture. Its territory corresponded with that of the current municipality Kavala, and part of the municipal unit Eleftheroupoli. It was abolished in 2006.

== Economy ==
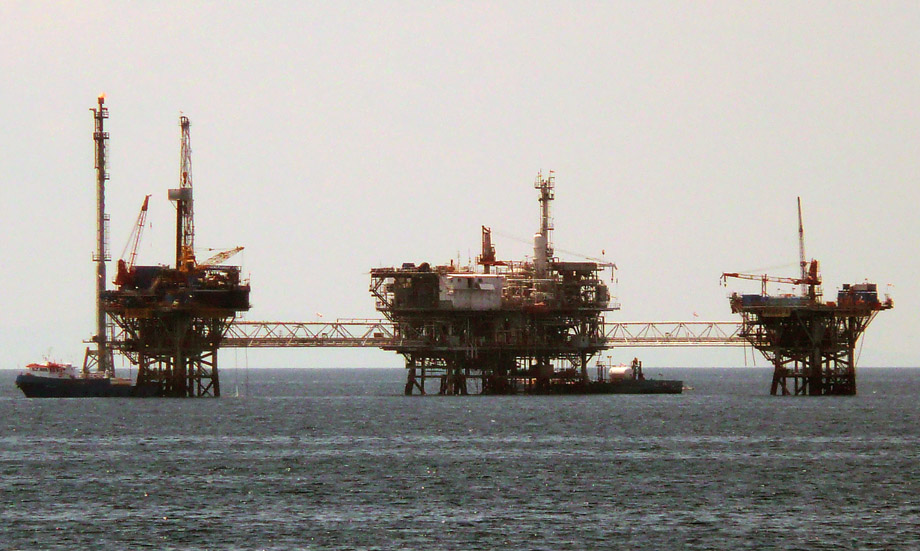
Prinos oil field

Traditionally the primary occupation of the population of Kavala was fishing. The fishermen of the town were well known all over northern Greece.

After the country's industrialization, Kavala also became a center of the tobacco industry in northern Greece. The building of the Municipal Tobacco Warehouse (1910) still stands today.

Oil deposits were found outside the city in the 1970s and are currently being exploited by two oil rigs (Prinos and Epsilon).

== Climate ==
Kavala has a hot-summer Mediterranean climate (Köppen climate classification: Csa) that borders on both a semi-arid climate in the city's airport area and a humid subtropical climate in the city center (Köppen climate classification: BSk, Cfa) with annual average precipitation of 466.2 mm (18.4 in) falling in the airport of Chrysoupoli. Snowfalls are sporadic, but happen more or less every year. The humidity is always moderate to high.

The absolute maximum temperature ever recorded was 38.0 °C (100 °F), while the absolute minimum ever recorded was −8.0 °C (18 °F).

Climate data for Kavala Weather Station 2006–2018
Month	Jan	Feb	Mar	Apr	May	Jun	Jul	Aug	Sep	Oct	Nov	Dec	Year
Mean daily maximum °C (°F)	9.7 (49.5)	10.9 (51.6)	13.7 (56.7)	18.0 (64.4)	22.9 (73.2)	27.3 (81.1)	30.1 (86.2)	30.6 (87.1)	25.6 (78.1)	19.9 (67.8)	15.7 (60.3)	11.3 (52.3)	19.6 (67.3)
Daily mean °C (°F)	6.8 (44.2)	7.9 (46.2)	10.5 (50.9)	14.6 (58.3)	19.4 (66.9)	23.8 (74.8)	26.6 (79.9)	27.1 (80.8)	22.2 (72.0)	16.7 (62.1)	12.7 (54.9)	8.4 (47.1)	16.4 (61.5)
Mean daily minimum °C (°F)	4.2 (39.6)	5.5 (41.9)	7.8 (46.0)	11.6 (52.9)	16.3 (61.3)	20.5 (68.9)	23.1 (73.6)	23.7 (74.7)	19.1 (66.4)	14.0 (57.2)	10.1 (50.2)	5.7 (42.3)	13.5 (56.3)
Average precipitation mm (inches)	57.5 (2.26)	65.4 (2.57)	68.2 (2.69)	37.8 (1.49)	48.7 (1.92)	51.8 (2.04)	25.4 (1.00)	21.4 (0.84)	49.8 (1.96)	64.7 (2.55)	48.6 (1.91)	62.0 (2.44)	601.3 (23.67)
Average precipitation days	9.2	9.1	11.6	7.9	8.5	7.7	4.2	2.8	5.4	7.4	7.9	9.3	91
Average relative humidity (%)	64.9	65.0	66.6	65.8	67.8	67.8	68.4	68.8	67.7	65.8	66.1	67.7	66.9
Source: meteokav.gr

Climate data for Kavala, "Alexander the Great" airport near Chrysoupoli
Month	Jan	Feb	Mar	Apr	May	Jun	Jul	Aug	Sep	Oct	Nov	Dec	Year
Mean daily maximum °C (°F)	9.5 (49.1)	10.3 (50.5)	12.9 (55.2)	17.5 (63.5)	22.8 (73.0)	27.4 (81.3)	30.1 (86.2)	30.2 (86.4)	25.7 (78.3)	20.4 (68.7)	15 (59)	10.6 (51.1)	19.4 (66.9)
Mean daily minimum °C (°F)	1.8 (35.2)	2.1 (35.8)	4.7 (40.5)	8.8 (47.8)	13.4 (56.1)	17.3 (63.1)	19.5 (67.1)	19.2 (66.6)	15.2 (59.4)	11 (52)	6.9 (44.4)	3.3 (37.9)	10.3 (50.5)
Average precipitation mm (inches)	41.3 (1.63)	49.3 (1.94)	36.6 (1.44)	33.2 (1.31)	30.2 (1.19)	26.2 (1.03)	22.4 (0.88)	17 (0.7)	24.8 (0.98)	44.5 (1.75)	62.3 (2.45)	78.4 (3.09)	466.2 (18.39)
Source: http://www.hnms.gr/emy/en/climatology/climatology_city?perifereia=East%20Macedonia%20and%20Thrace&poli=Kavala_Chryssoupoli (1985-2010 averages)

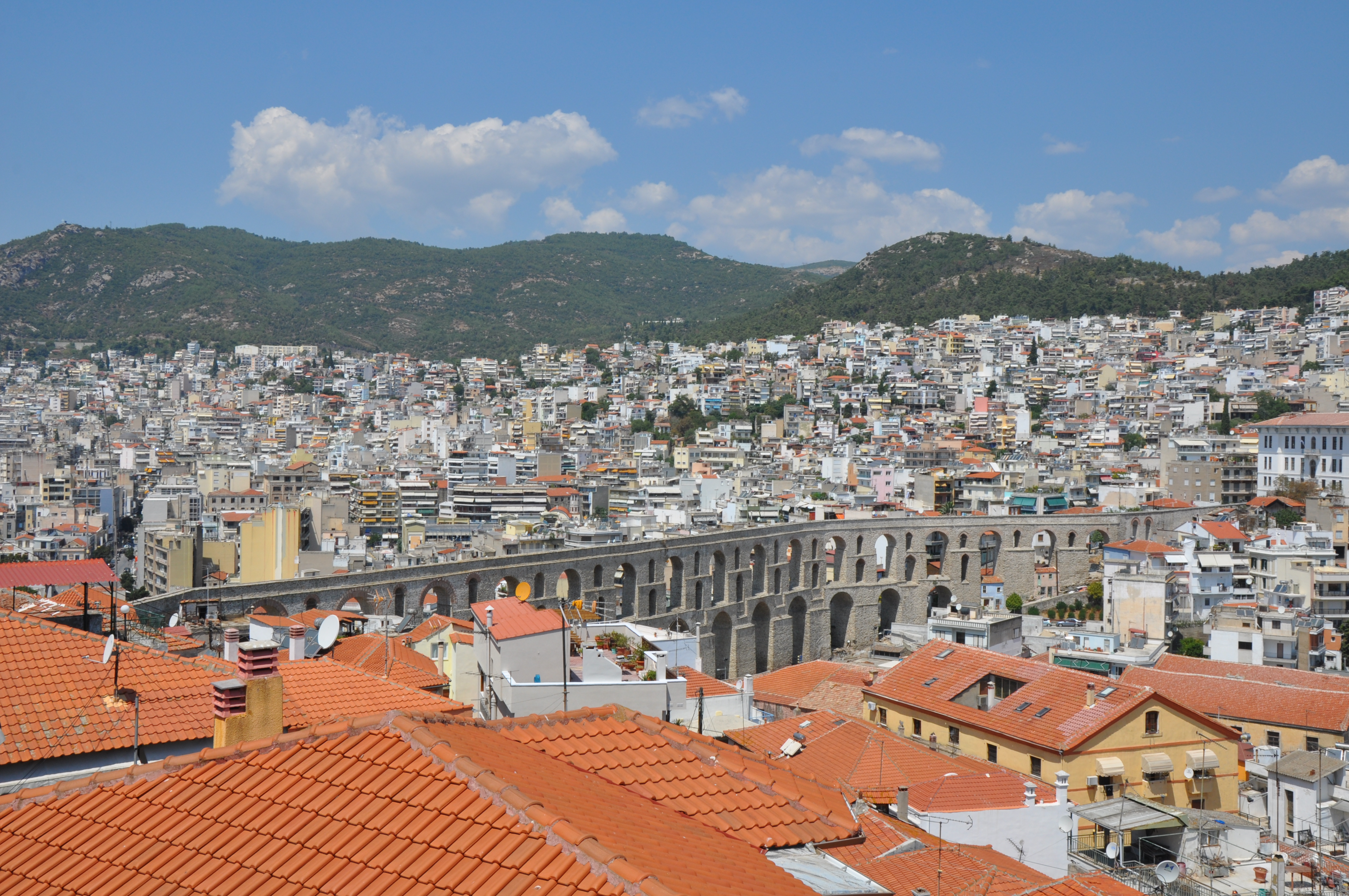
Kavala's overview with the aqueduct.

== Education and research ==
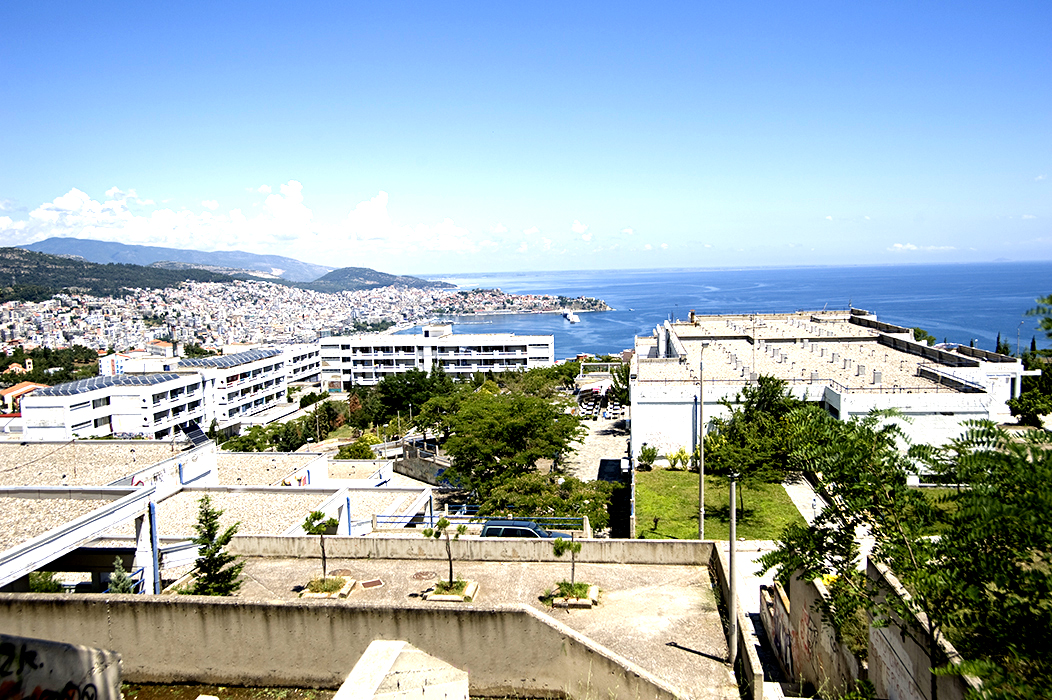
The International Hellenic University (panoramic view)

- The International Hellenic University (IHU; Greek: Διεθνές Πανεπιστήμιο της Ελλάδος) has five departments in Kavala (Computer Science, Physics, Chemistry, Management Science and Technology, Accounting and Information Systems). The campus of the institute located in St. Lukas, Kavala and is approximately 132,000 m^{2} with buildings covering an area of 36,000 m^{2}.
- MSc in Management and Information Systems
- Fisheries Research Institute (FRI) is one of the five specialized research institutes of N.AG.RE.F, being responsible to conduct research and to promote technological development in the fishery sector. The institute is located 17 km (11 mi) from Kavala, in Nea Peramos, at the center of a marine area with rich fishery grounds and high biodiversity in the surrounding lagoons, lakes, and rivers.
- Institute of Mohamed Ali for the Research of the Eastern Tradition (IMARET) is a registered NGO with the Hellenic Ministry of Foreign Affairs, which was established by concerned citizens in Kavala. Its aims include the study of the Egyptian influence in Greece and vice versa. The intra-cultural exchange and dialogue, as well as the promotion of art as a means of intra-cultural understanding. The first major co-operation partner is Cultnat of Bibliotheca Alexandrina with the aim of documenting and digitizing the architectural heritage of the Mohamed Ali era in Egypt and Greece. The most important event that takes place every year at the institute is the International Roman Law Moot Court Competition.
- Historical & Literary Archives of Kavala is a non-profiteering, public utility foundation. Its foundation was not subsidized by the Greek State, either by any other enterprise of the private sector. Its operational cost is covered only by its founders and by infrequent aids of the local self-government.
- Egnatia Aviation is a private training college for pilots that started training in Greece in July 2006. The facilities of Egnatia Aviation are mostly located in the former passengers' terminal of the Kavala International Airport "Alexander the Great".

== Culture ==
=== Festivals and events ===
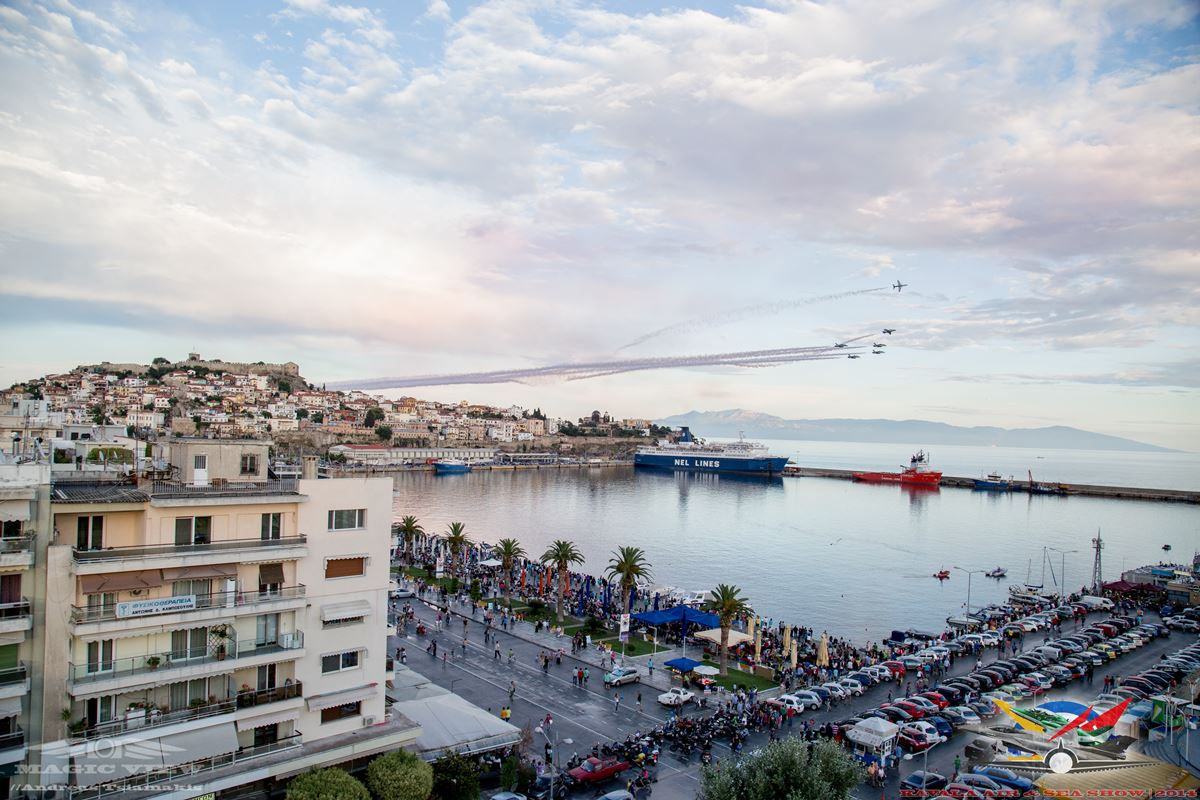
Kavala AirSea Show

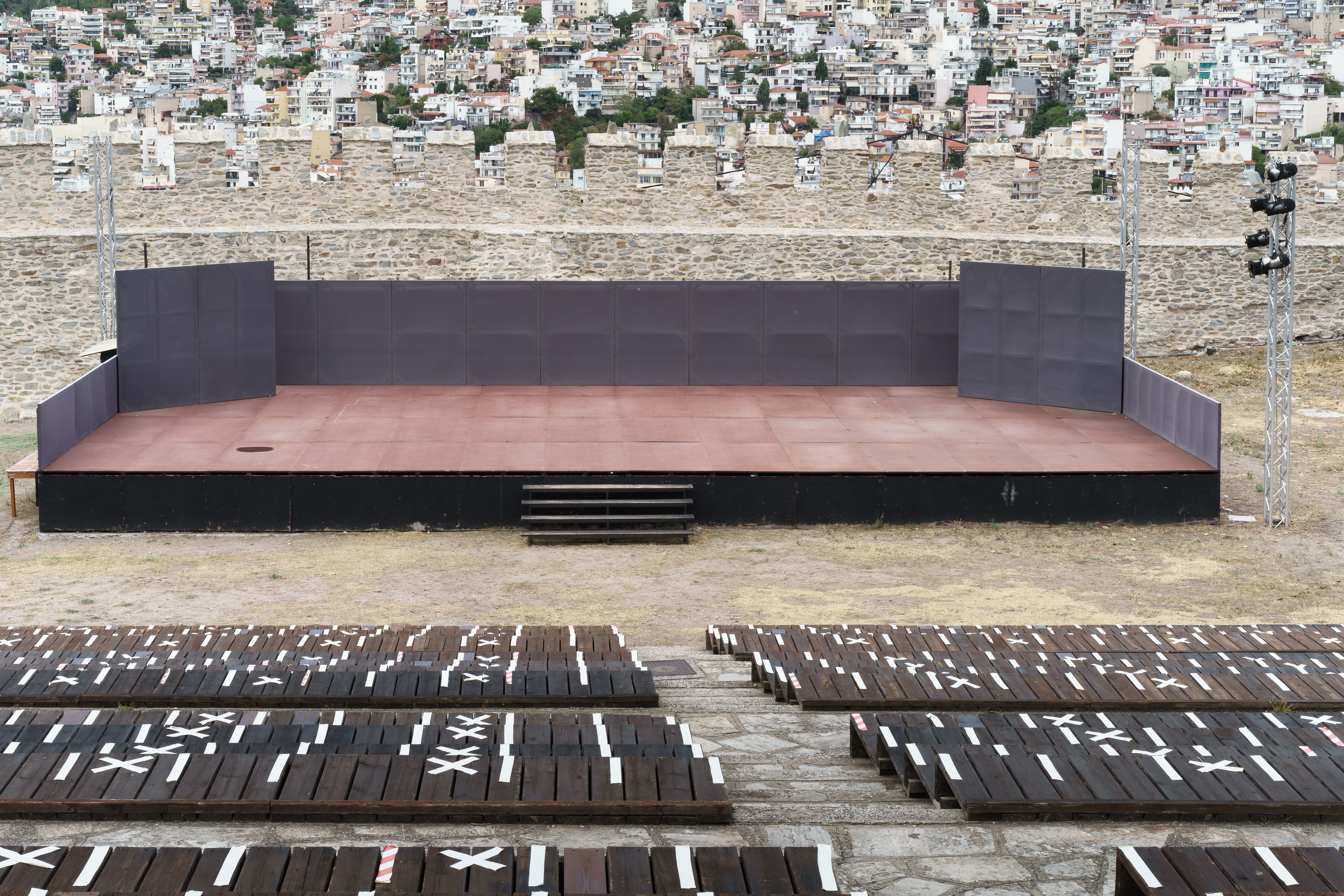
Social distancing measures on the castle

Kavala hosts a wide array of cultural events, which mostly take place during the summer months. One of the top festivals is the Festival of Philippi which lasts from July to September and includes theatrical performances and music concerts. Since 1957, it has been the city's most important cultural event and one of the most important of Greece.

Kavala AirSea Show is also an annual air show held in late June.

"Cosmopolis" is an international festival held in the Old Town of Kavala that offers an acquaintance with cultures around the world through dancing and musical groups, traditional national cuisines, cinema, and exhibits at the kiosks of participant countries. The first festival took place in 2000, and from 2002 until 2009 was organized annually. It was revived in 2016 with a participation of 250 artists and musicians from all over the world.

Yiannis Papaioannou's Festival includes concerts and music seminars.

"Ilios kai Petra" (Sun and Stone) (July) is a festival held in "Akontisma" of Nea Karvali. The event is of folkloric character, with the participation of traditional dancing groups from all over the world.

Wood Water Wild Festival is an outdoor activities festival, inspired by nature. It includes live bands and DJ sets, body&mind activities, a book fair, outdoor theatre, ecology, camping, and debates.

Various cultural events are held in all municipalities of Kavala during the summer months.

=== Cuisine ===
Fish and seafood, as well as the products of the local livestock breeding and agricultural sectors, are the prevailing elements of Kavala cuisine. In Kavala, the traditional local recipes have been also influenced by the cuisine of the refugees from Pontus and Asia Minor.

Fresh fish and seafood, especially sardines, shrimp salad (garidosalata), mackerel "goúna" (sun-dried mackerel on the grill), kavouropilafo, mussels with rice, herring saganáki, anchovies wrapped in grape leaves, stuffed eggplants and from meat plates, lamb with spinach, are some renowned recipes in Kavala and the coastal settlements of the region. The grapes, wine, and tsipouro produced in the area, as well as the kourabiedes (sugar-coated almond biscuits) from Nea Karvali, are particularly famous.

== Transport ==
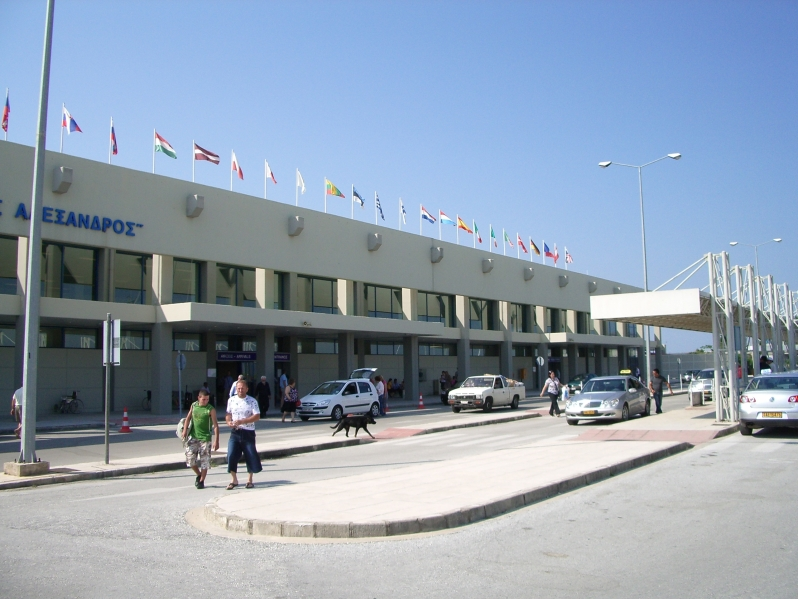
Outside the airport Megas Alexandros

=== Highway network ===
European route E90 runs through the city and connects Kavala with the other cities. The Egnatia Odos (A2 motorway) lies north of the city. One can enter the city from one of two junctions: Kavala West and Kavala East. Kavala has regular connection with Interregional Bus Lines (KTEL) from and to Thessaloniki and Athens.

=== Airport ===
The Kavala International Airport "Alexander the Great" (27 km (17 mi) from Kavala) is connected with Athens by regularly scheduled flights and with many European cities by scheduled and charter flights.

=== Port ===
Kavala is connected with all the islands of the Northern Aegean Sea with frequent itineraries of various ferry lines.

=== Bus ===
The city is connected with all of the large Greek cities such as Thessaloniki and Athens. All of the local villages are also connected via bus lines. The cost of tickets is very cheap. There is also a shuttle bus in Kavala with these lines:

- Vironas – Kallithea
- Dexameni
- Cemetery
- Kipoupoli – Technological Institute
- Agios Loukas
- Profitis Ilias
- Stadium
- Kalamitsa – Batis (only in summer)
- Agios Konstantinos
- Neapoli
- Hospital – Perigiali

=== Rail ===
Kavala is not currently connected to the Greek rail network. However, plans exist to build a new Thessaloniki–Xanthi rail line via Kavala, as part of the Egnatia Railway corridor, at a cost of €1.25 billion. In 2019, Hellenic Railways Organisation awarded the contract to build the initial 31.8 km (19.8 mi) section between Xanthi and Kavala at a cost of €250 million.

=== Trails ===
The Kavala Water Trail is a hiking trail that connects the village of Palaia Kavala with the Agios Konstantinos neighborhood of Kavala.

== Sports ==
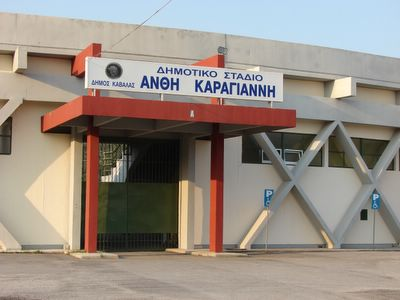
Municipal stadium Anthi Karagianni

- Kavala F.C.: AO Kavala (Greek: Athlitikos Omilos Kavala, Αθλητικός Όμιλος Καβάλα), the Athletic Club Kavala, is a professional association football club based in Kavala. The club plays in the municipal Kavala Stadium "Anthi Karagianni".
- Kavala B.C.: Enosi Kalathosfairisis Kavalas (Greek: Ένωση Καλαθοσφαίρισης Καβάλας – Basketball Union of Kavala) is a Greek professional basketball club in Kavala. The club is also known as E.K. Kavalas. The club's full Greek name is Ένωση Καλαθοσφαίρισης Καβάλας (Kavala Basketball Union or Kavala Basketball Association). The club competes in the Greek League.
- Kavala '86: a women's football club, founded in 1986, with panhellenic titles in Greek women football
- Kavala Chess Club: Chess is very popular in Kavala and the local chess club ranks top in Greece, enjoying plenty of success both domestically and internationally. The highlight is the club's annual International Open, which takes place every August in Kavala and attracts the biggest names in chess from all over the globe.
- Nautical Club of Kavala (1945, Ναυτικός Ομιλος Καβάλας, ΝΟΚ): maritime sports (swimming, yachting, water polo)
- Kavala Table Tennis Club (ΑΣΕΑ Καβάλας): table tennis
- Kavala Titans (2009, Τιτάνες Καβάλας): rugby union/rugby league

== Ecclesiastical history ==
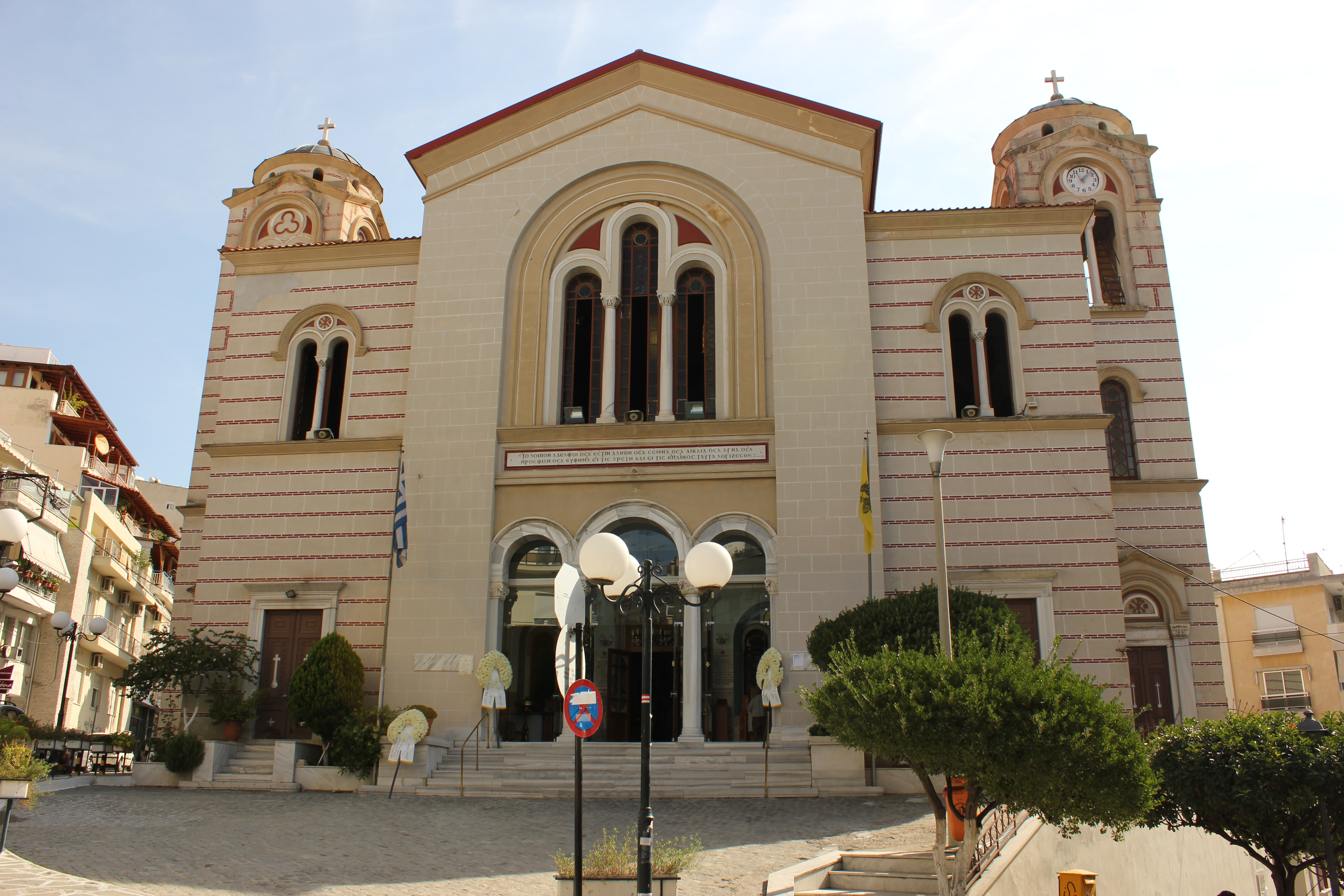
Saint Paul church, patron saint

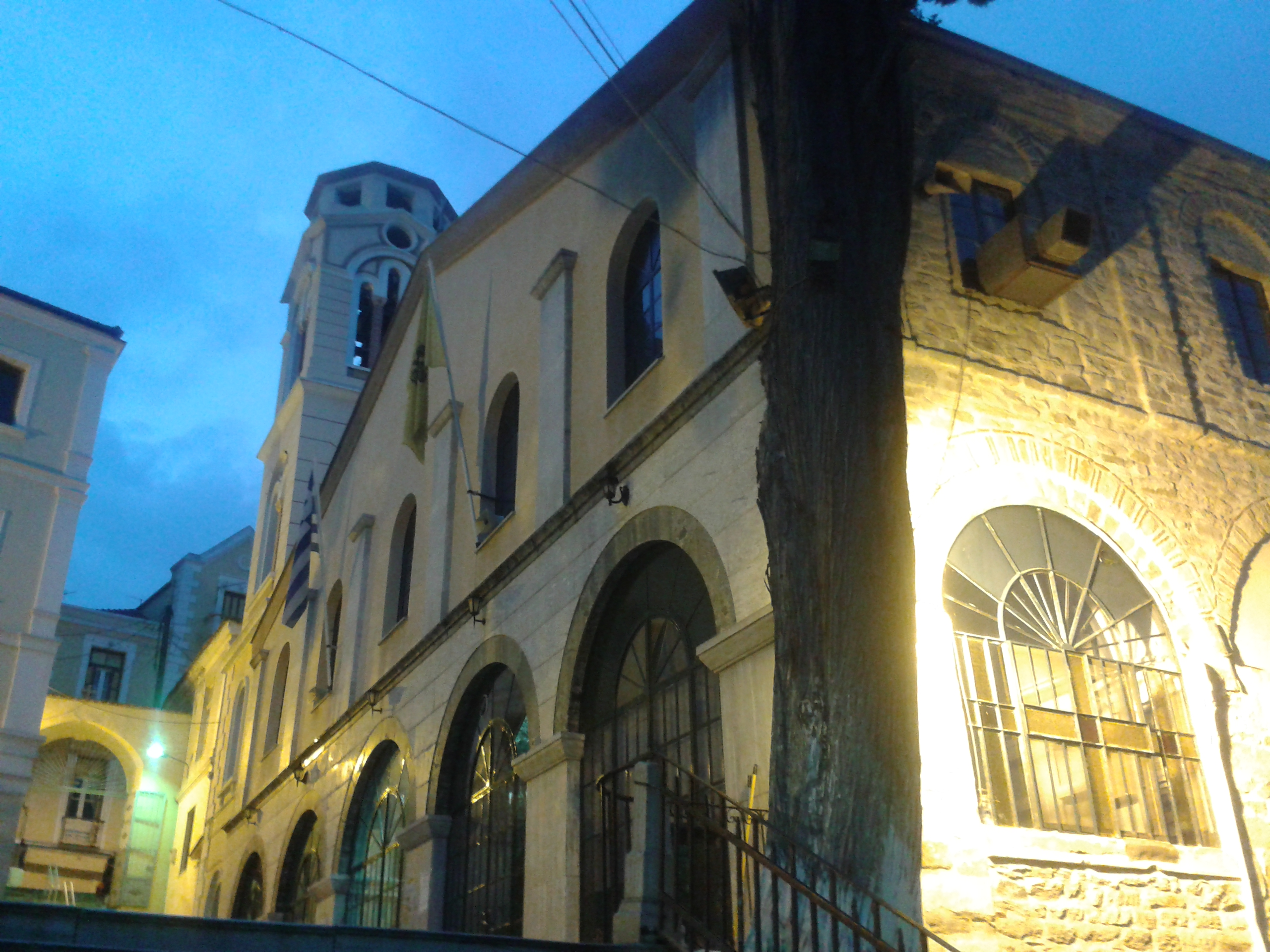
St John the Baptist

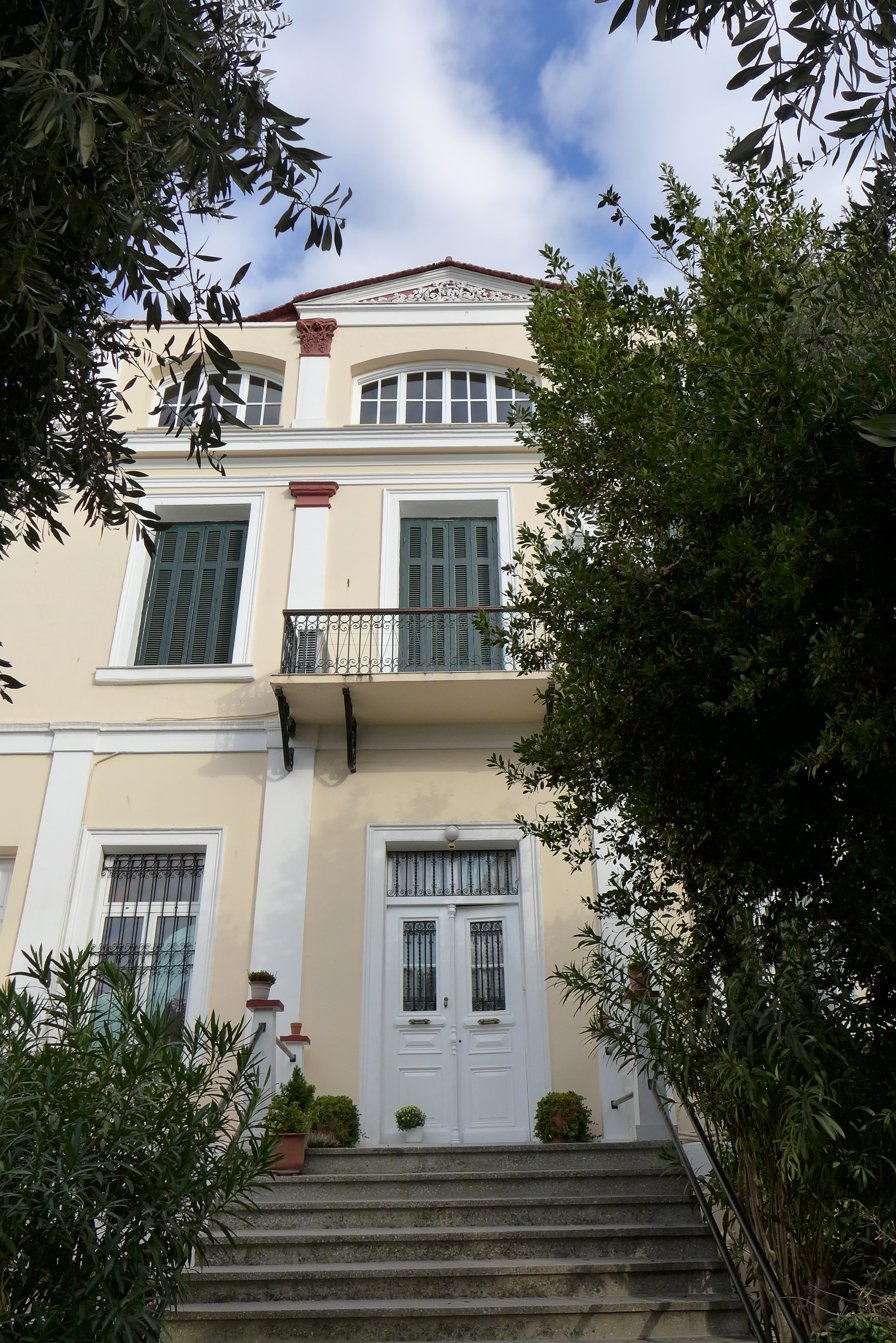
Lazarist Monastery

Neapolis was important enough in the Late Roman province of Macedonia Prima to be a suffragan of its capital Philippi's Metropolitan Archbishopric into the frames of the Greek – Christian eastern church. In the 8th century A.D. refers for the first time a bishopric of Christoupolis and later, between 886 – 912, during the reign of the emperor Leo the Wise, Christoupolis is mentioned as one of the six bishoprics of the metropolis of Philippi. Only later, in 1260, Christoupolis became a metropolis itself. After the liberation of the city of Kavala by the Greek army during the Balkan Wars, the local church was re-established under the official title "Metropolis of Philippi, Neapolis and Thasos" till nowadays. Metropolis of Kavala established a conference center dedicated to Saint Paul, in the village of Lydia, near the spot where, according to tradition, Paul baptized saint Lydia, in the river Zygaktis. In the same spot, Metropolis established a unique open-air baptistery as well as a unique octagonal baptistery, with mosaic and stained glass decoration, the only such temple in Greece.

=== Titular see ===
The diocese of Christopolis was nominally restored in 1933 as a Latin Catholic titular bishopric. There is also a Catholic church in the city ("Saint Paul", in the building of the old Lazarist monastery).

It is vacant, having had the following, far from consecutive, incumbents of the lowest (episcopal) rank, except the latest (archiepiscopal, intermediary rank):

- Jean Isembert, Dominican Order (O.P.) (1450.05.11 – 1465.09.08)
- Jaime Perez de Valencia, Augustinian Order (O.E.S.A.) (1468.10.01 – 1490.08.03)
- Ausiás Carbonell, O.P. (1509.04.16 – 1532.12.09)
- Enrique Rutil (1525.11.10 – ?)
- Bishop-elect Francisco de Jaén (1530.12.05 – ?)
- Francisco Estaña (1534.12.16 – 1549.06.23)
- Gian Antonio Fassano (1544.06.04 – 1568.09.10)
- Juan Segría (1547.11.28 – 1568.07.23) as Auxiliary Bishop of Valencia (Spain) (1547.11.28 – 1568.07.23); later Metropolitan Archbishop of Sassari (Sardinia, Italy) (1568.07.23 – death 1569.09.26), Metropolitan Archbishop of Palermo (Sicily, Italy) (1569.09.26 – 1569 not possessed)
- Pedro Coderos (1570.02.20 – 1579.10.21) as Auxiliary Bishop of Valencia (Spain) (1570.02.20 – 1579.10.21); later Metropolitan Archbishop of Otranto (Italy) (1579.10.21 – 1585)
- Marcin Szyszkowski (1603.11.24 – 1604.06)
- Ludovico de Taragni, Benedictine Order (O.S.B.) (1612.03.21 – ?)
- Michael Chumer, Friars Minor (O.F.M.) (1639.10.03 – 1651.06.30)
- Maxime Tessier (1951.05.28 – 1955.05.08)
- Otto Spülbeck (1955.06.28 – 1958.06.23)
- Michael William Hyle (1958.07.03 – 1960.03.02)
- Titular Archbishop Sante Portalupi (1961.10.14 – 1984.03.31), papal diplomat

== Media ==
- TV: ENA Channel, Center TV
- Newspapers: Proini, Kavala, Chronometro

== Postage stamps ==
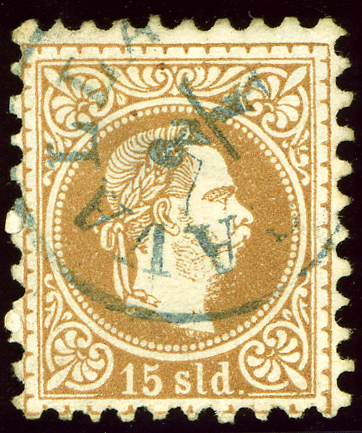
Austrian Levant stamp with blue Cavalla cancellation

Austria opened a post office in Kavala before 1864. Between 1893 and 1903, the French post office in the city issued its own postage stamps; at first stamps of France overprinted with "Cavalle" and a value in piasters, then in 1902 the French designs inscribed "CAVALLE".

== Consulates ==
In the past the city hosted consulates from different European countries. Currently hosts consulates from the following countries:

- Italy

== Notable figures ==
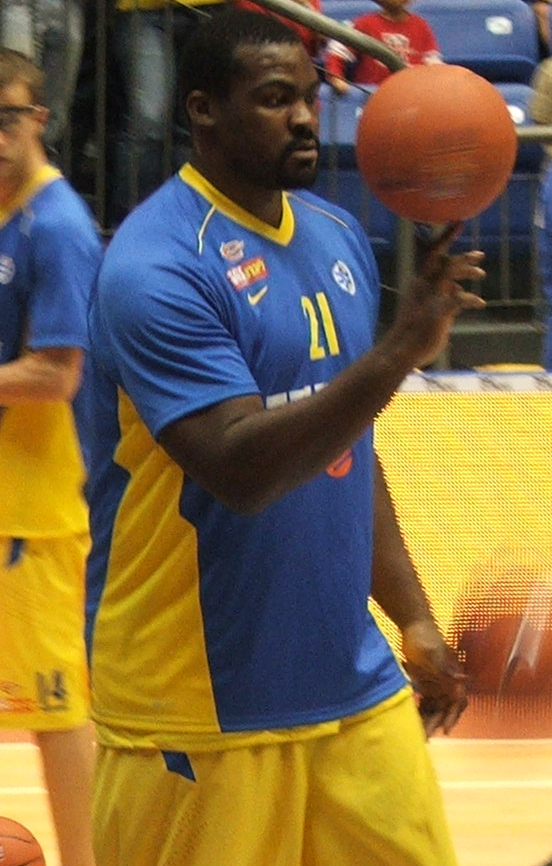
Sofoklis Schortsanitis

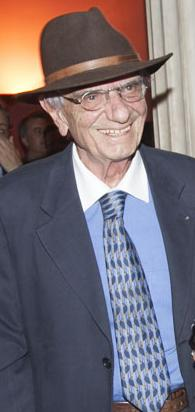
Vassilis Vassilikos

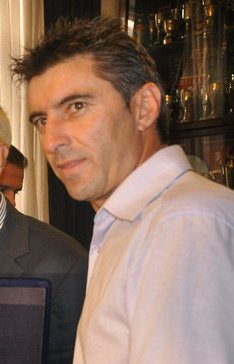
Theodoros Zagorakis

- Ilarion Karatzoglou, Greek rebel in the Greek Revolution (1821–1829) against the Ottoman Empire
- Muhammad Ali Pasha of Kavala, the Albanian Wali (governor) of Egypt between 1805 and 1848 and founder of the modern state of Egypt
- Mohamed Sherif Pasha, Prime Minister of Egypt
- Tryfon Alexiadis, politician
- Evangelia Balta, historian
- Christos Batzios, actor and filmmaker
- Anna-Maria Botsari, chess player
- Vassilis Daniil, football coach
- Pavlos Dermitzakis, football coach
- Periklis Drakos, Greek chieftain of the Macedonian Struggle and Balkan Wars
- Nasos Galakteros, basketball player
- Giorgos Georgiadis, footballer
- Anna Gerasimou, tennis player
- Nikos Karageorgiou (born 1962), football manager
- Anthi Karagianni, silver medalist in the Athens 2004 and Beijing 2008 Paralympic Games; the city's Municipal stadium is named after her
- Theodore Kavalliotis, Greek Orthodox priest, teacher and a figure of the Greek Enlightenment
- Vasilis Karras, singer
- Kostas Mitroglou, footballer
- Leontios Petmezas, theorist, art historian, book critic, author and journalist
- Yiannis Papaioannou, composer
- Dimitris Paridis, footballer
- Mitsos Partsalidis, first elected communist mayor in modern Greek history, on 1 April 1934
- Betty Robbins, cantor
- Sofoklis Schortsanitis, basketball player
- Giannis Stoforidis, kickboxer
- Christos Terzanidis, footballer
- Lefteris Topalidis, footballer
- Antigone Valakou, actress
- Despina Vandi, singer
- Anna Verouli, 1982 Gold Medalist, European Championship, javelin thrower
- Vassilis Vassilikos, writer and diplomat
- Zisis Vryzas (born 1973), former footballer
- Theodoros Zagorakis (born 27 October 1971), former footballer, captain of national team of Greece, European Champions 2004
- Damianos Zarifis, scenic and costume designer
- FORG1VEN, professional League of Legends player
- Chris Pantazidis, footballer

== Tourist attractions ==
The tourist attractions include:

- Panagia or Panayia (old town): A charming neighborhood filled with colorful local architecture, winding cobblestone alleys, and traditional tavernas leading up the peninsula.
- Kavala Fortress: A Byzantine citadel sitting at the highest point of Panagia, offering panoramic, 360-degree views of the Aegean Sea and the city below.
- Kamares: Massive 16th-century Ottoman aqueduct that stands as the structural gateway dividing the old and new parts of Kavala.
- Mehmet Ali Pasha House Museum: The birthplace of the founder of modern Egypt, featuring a well-preserved 18th-century Ottoman mansion.
- Kavala Archaeological Museum: It houses ancient artifacts from Neapolis (ancient Kavala) and surrounding sites, covering prehistory to Roman times.
- Kavala Municipality Tobacco Museum: It showcases the city's golden era as a major 19th-century tobacco processing hub, detailing the commercial history and tools used.
- Archaeological Site of Philippi: A UNESCO World Heritage site located a short drive north of the city, home to an ancient theater, a Roman forum, and early Christian basilicas.

== In popular culture ==
- In 1934, Mitsos Partsalidis was elected mayor of Kavala; the first communist mayor in modern Greek history. The city gained temporarily by the press, the nickname "little Moscow".
- Among movies shot in the city is Topkapi (1964), partially shot in Kavala.

== Gallery ==
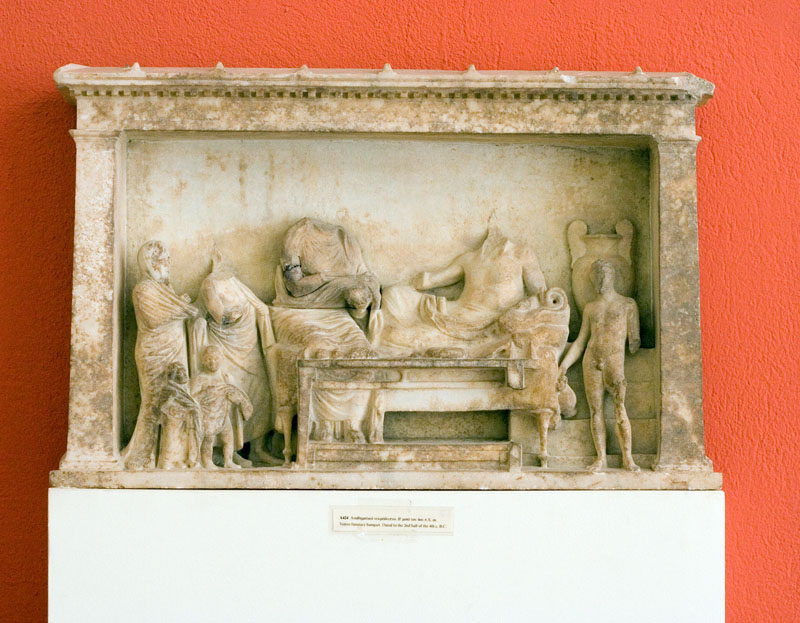
Α painted cist grave votive funerary banquet, 4th century BC (Archaeological Museum of Kavala)

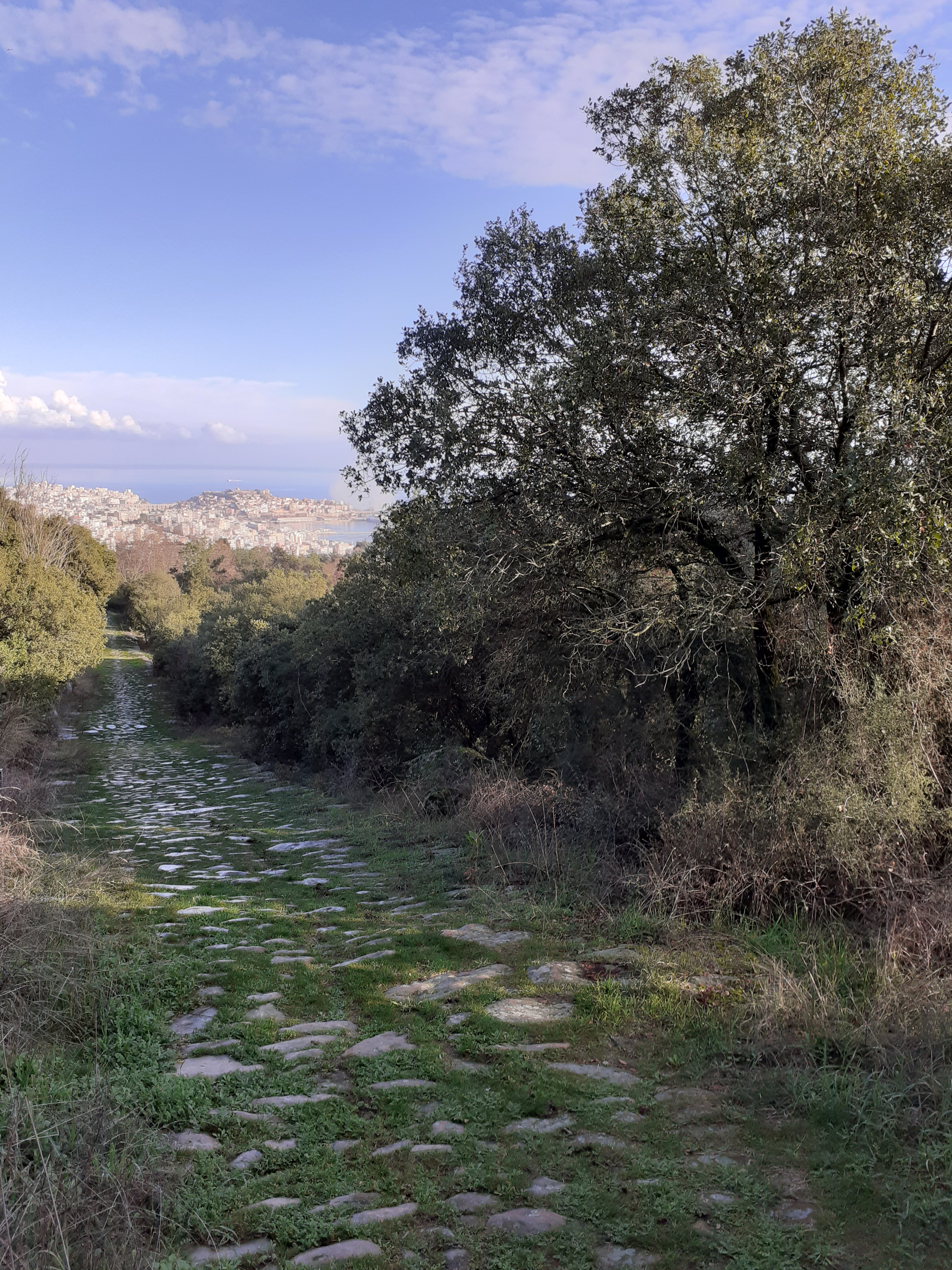
view of Kavala from the ancient Via Egnatia

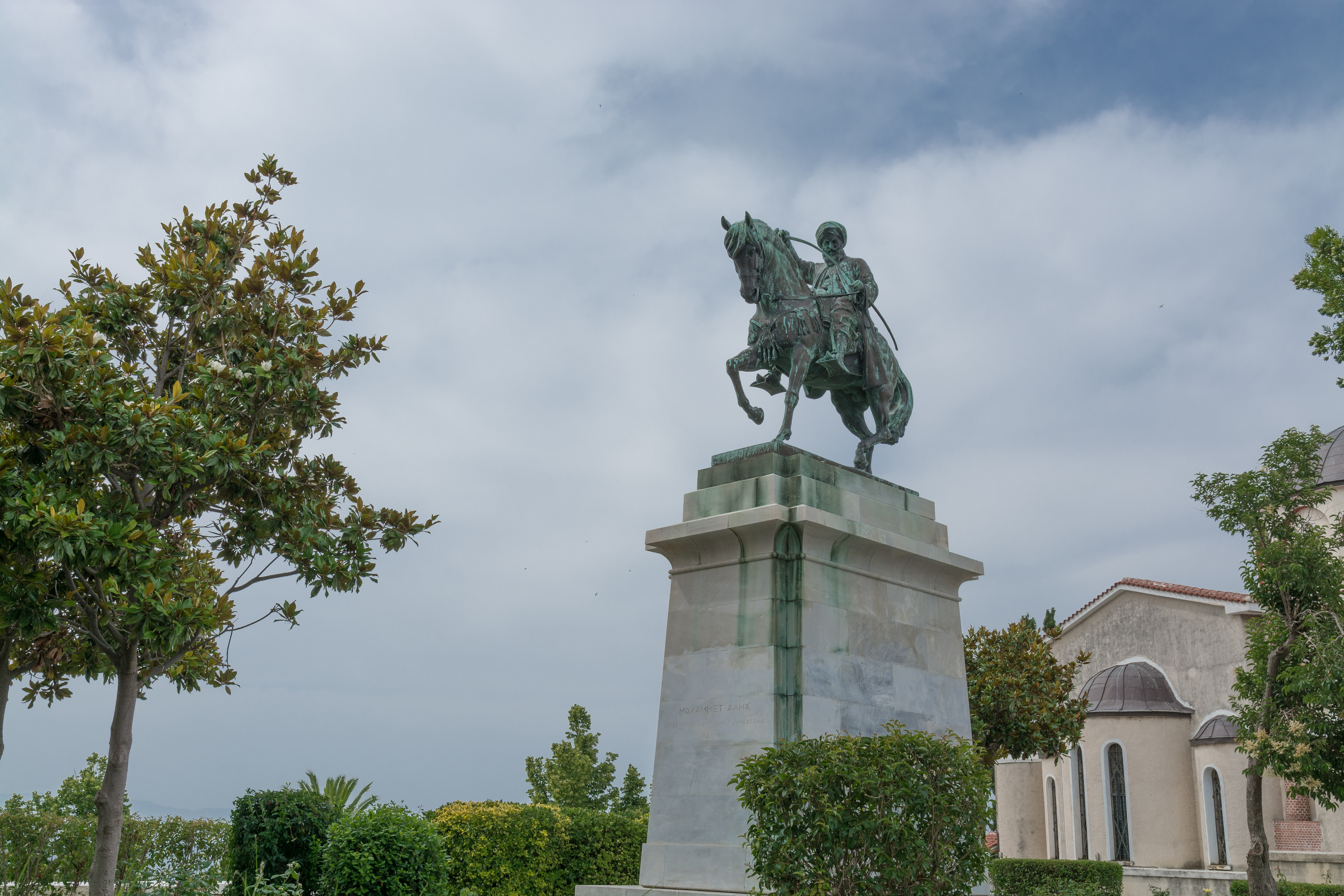
Statue of Muhammad Ali of Egypt, donation of Egypt (sculpt. Konstantinos Dimitriadis)

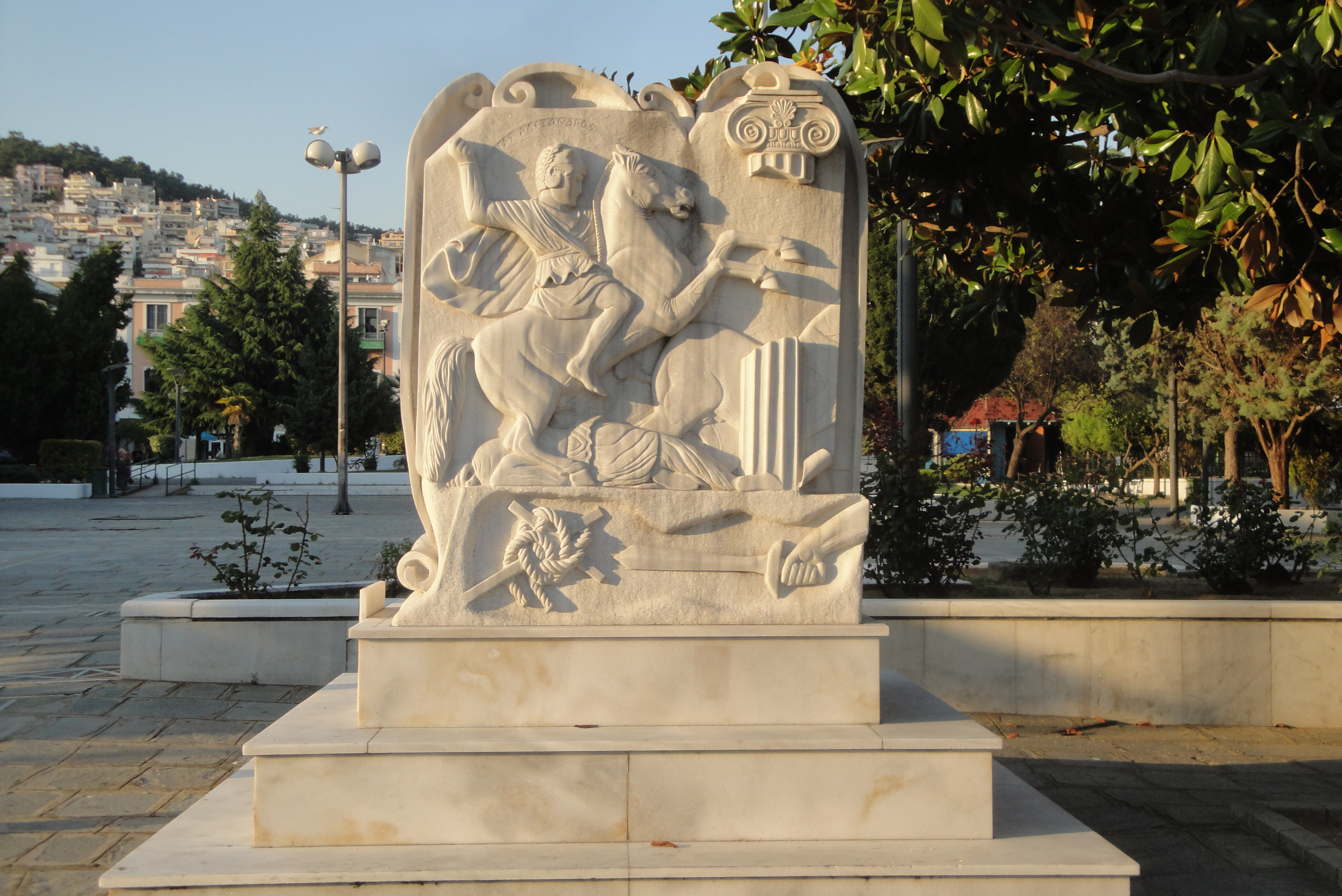
Alexander the Great monument

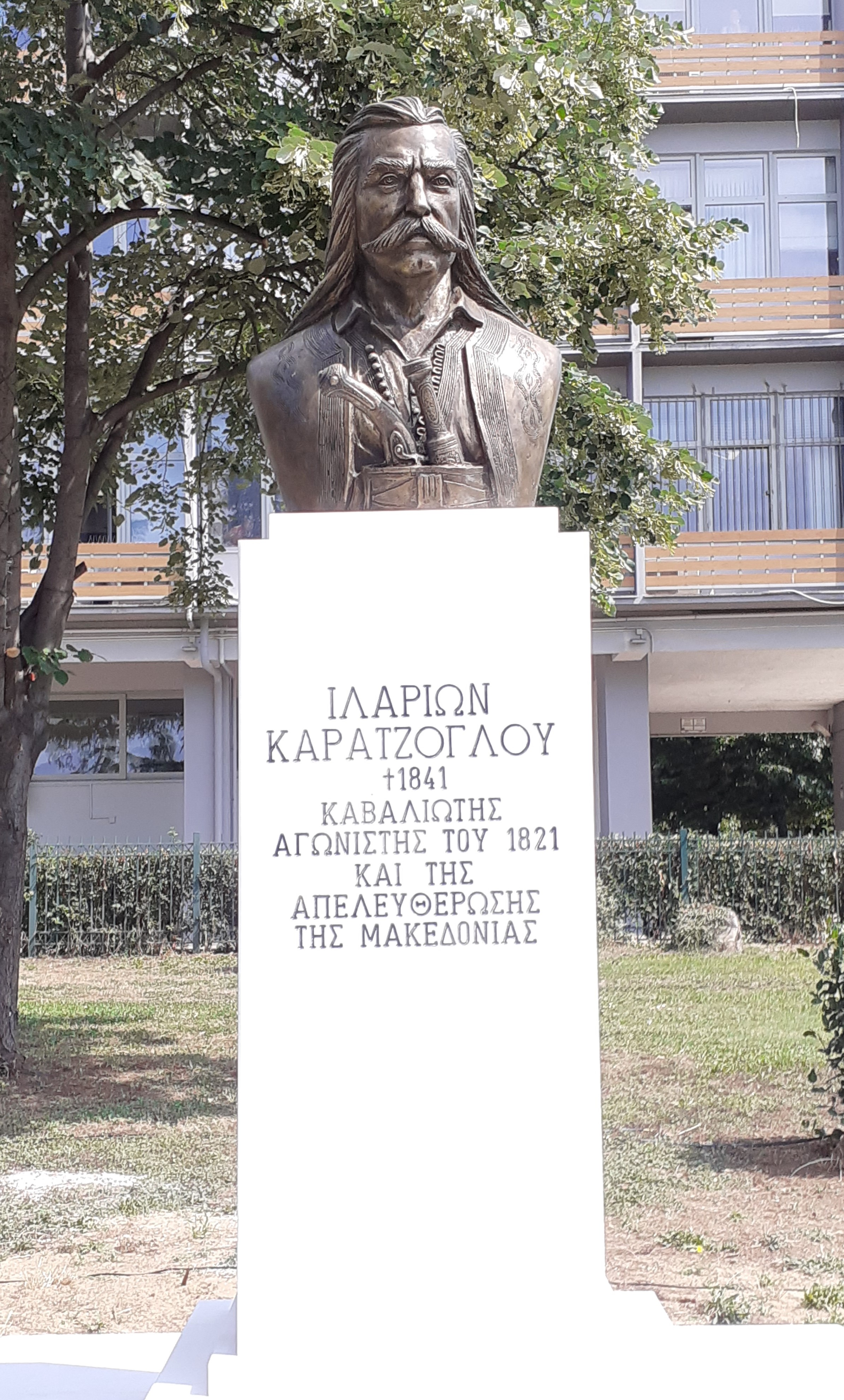
Bust of Ilarion Karatzoglou

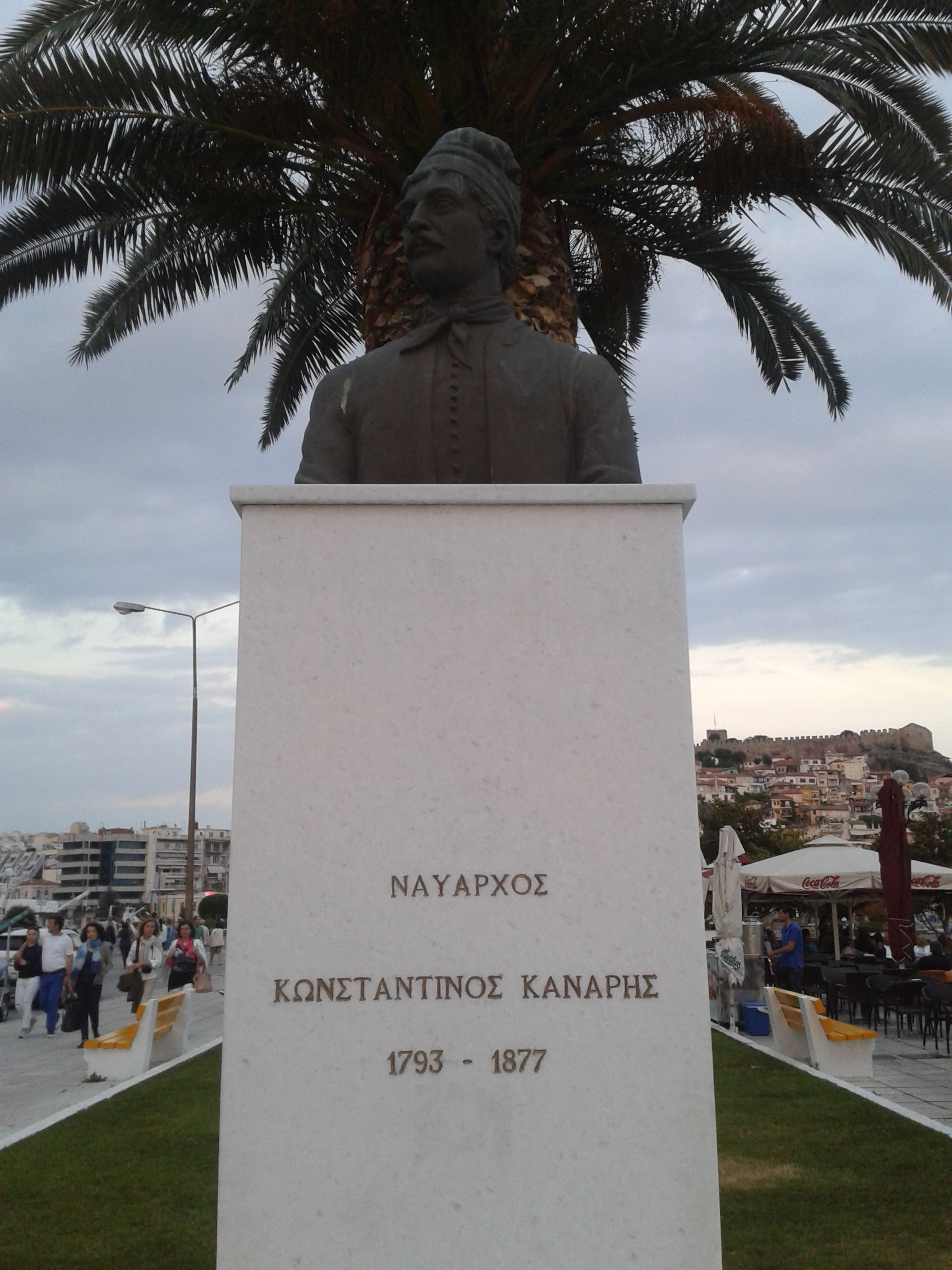
Bust of Konstantinos Kanaris

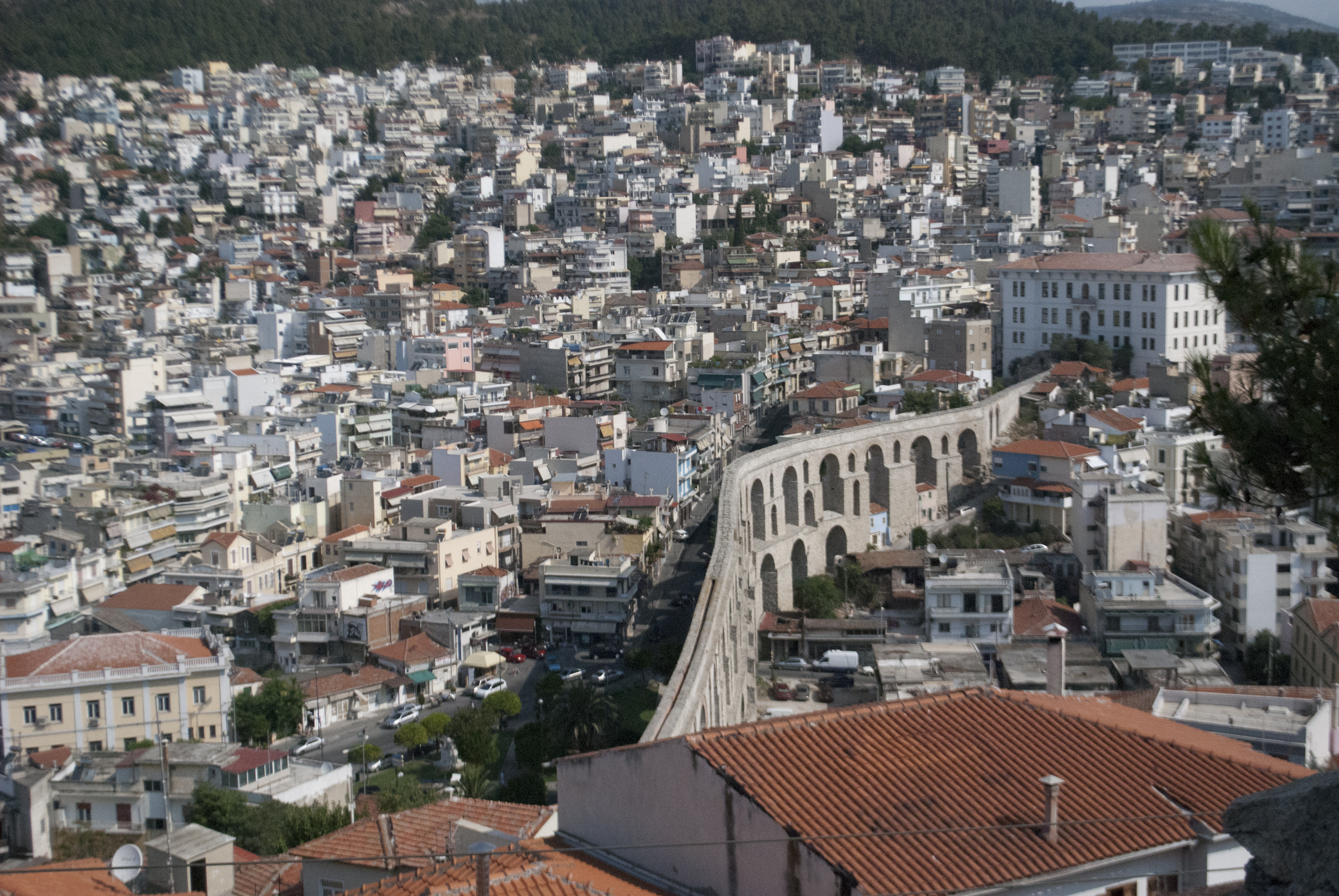
Panoramic view

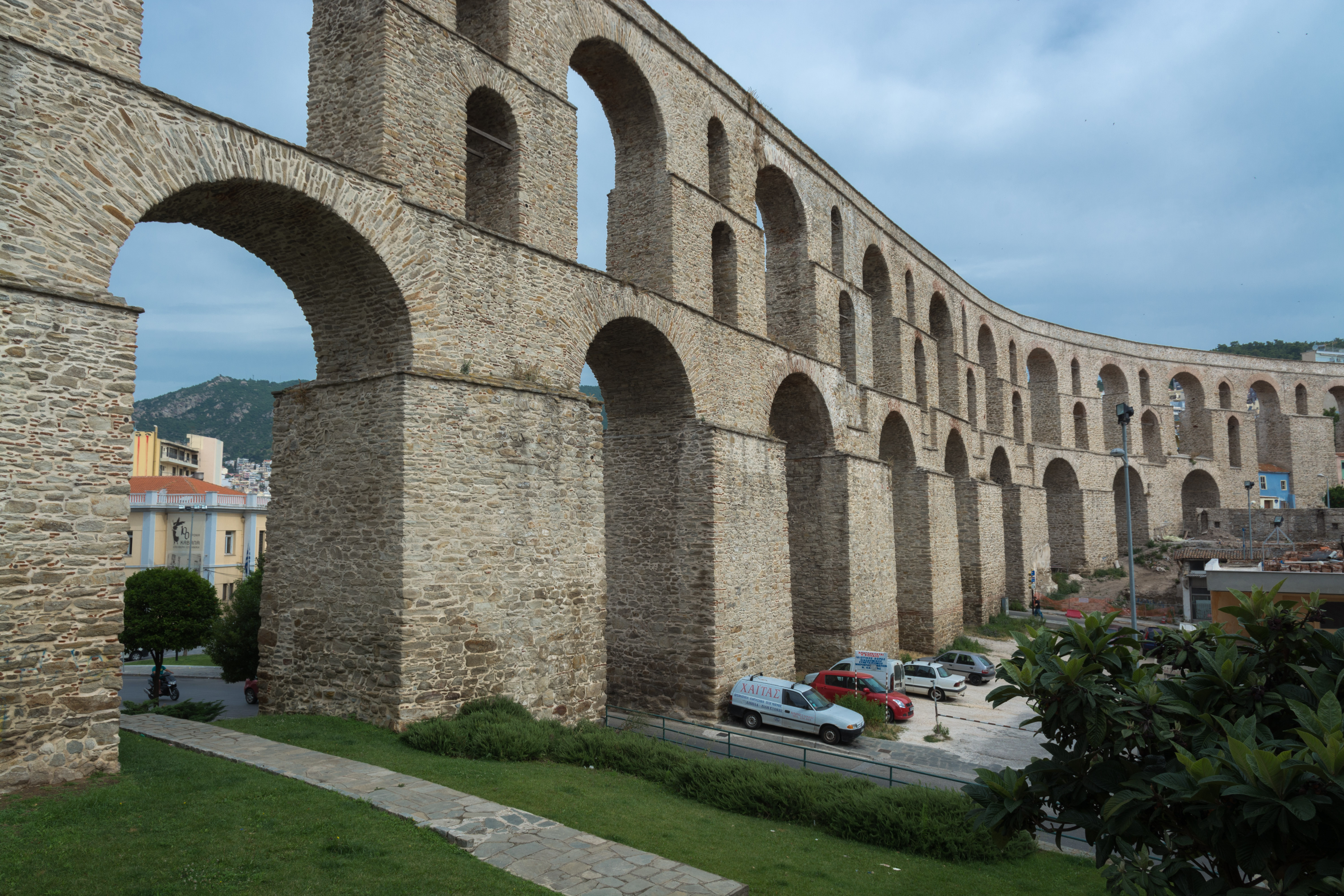
View of the Kavala aqueduct

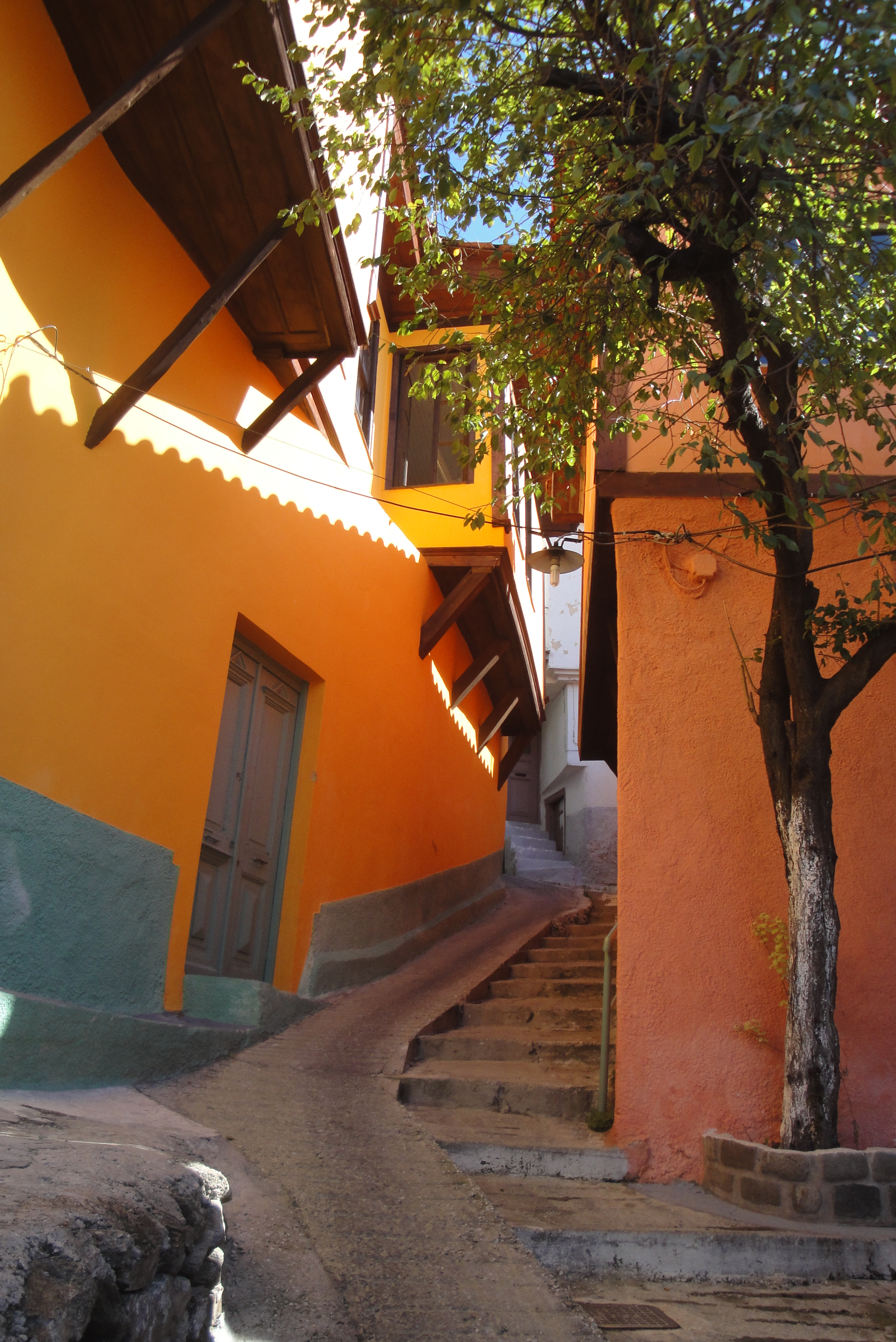
Kavala old town

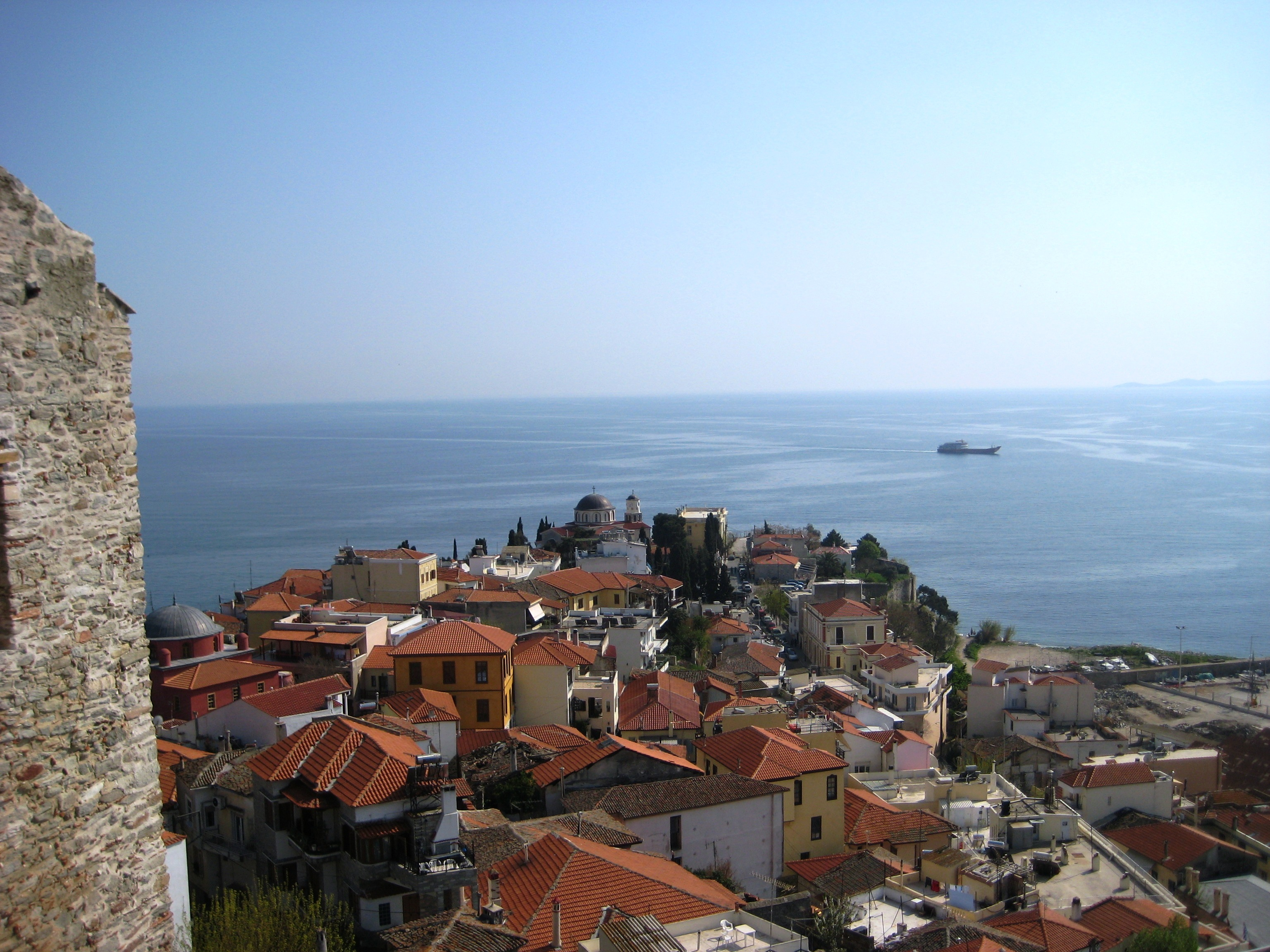
Kavala old town, view from the castle

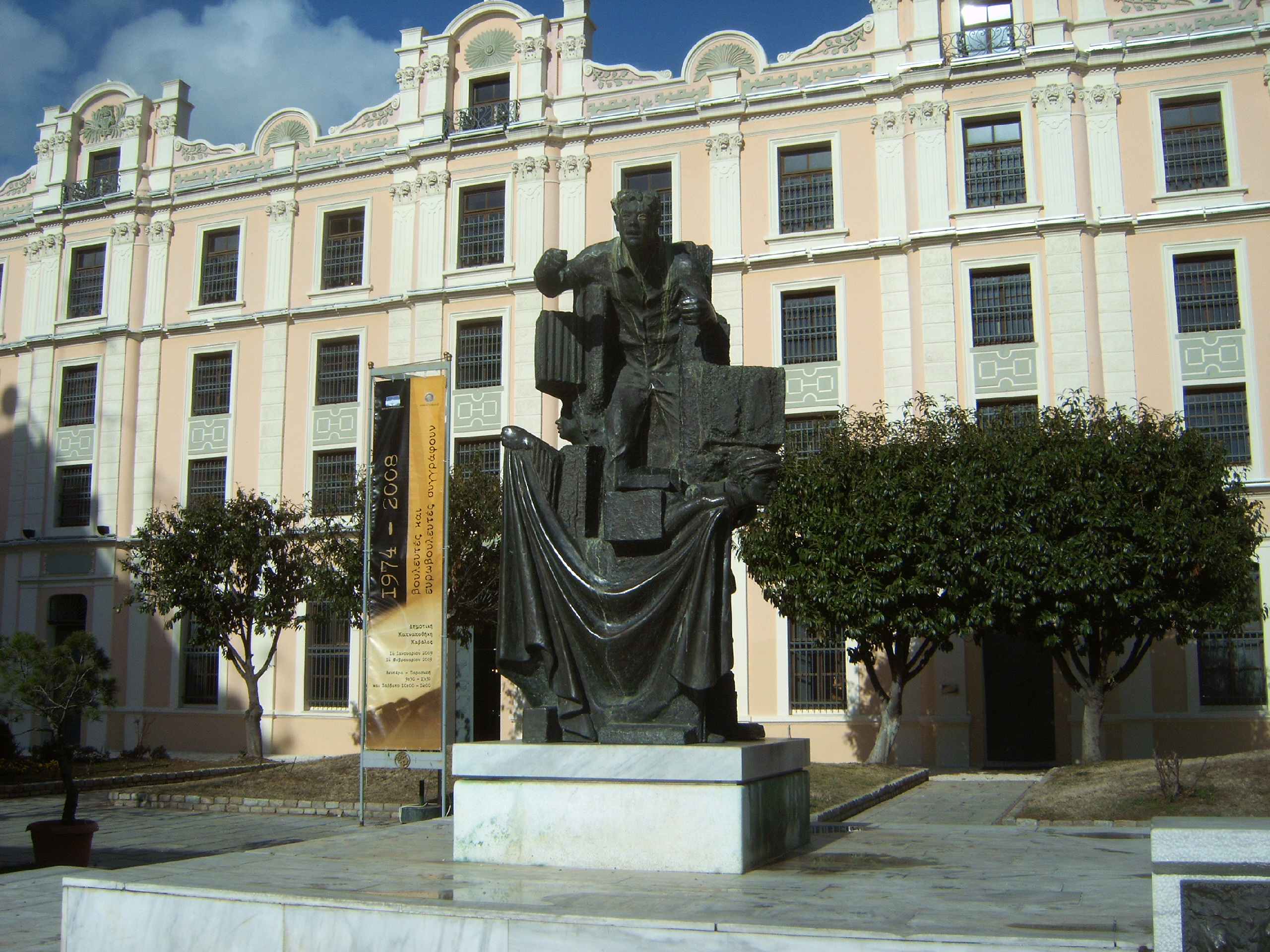
Municipal Tobacco Warehouse (1910, arch. Eli Modiano) in Kapnergati Square

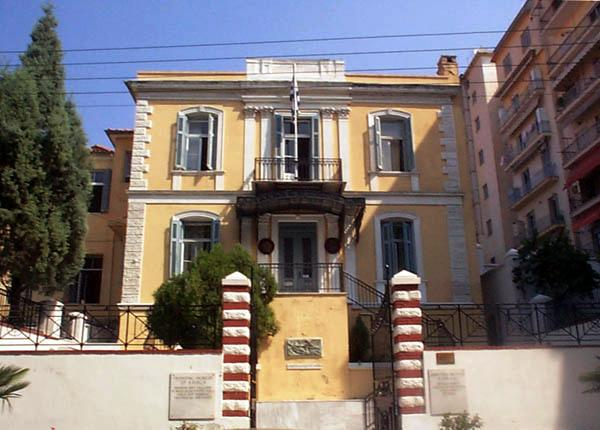
Kavala Municipal Museum

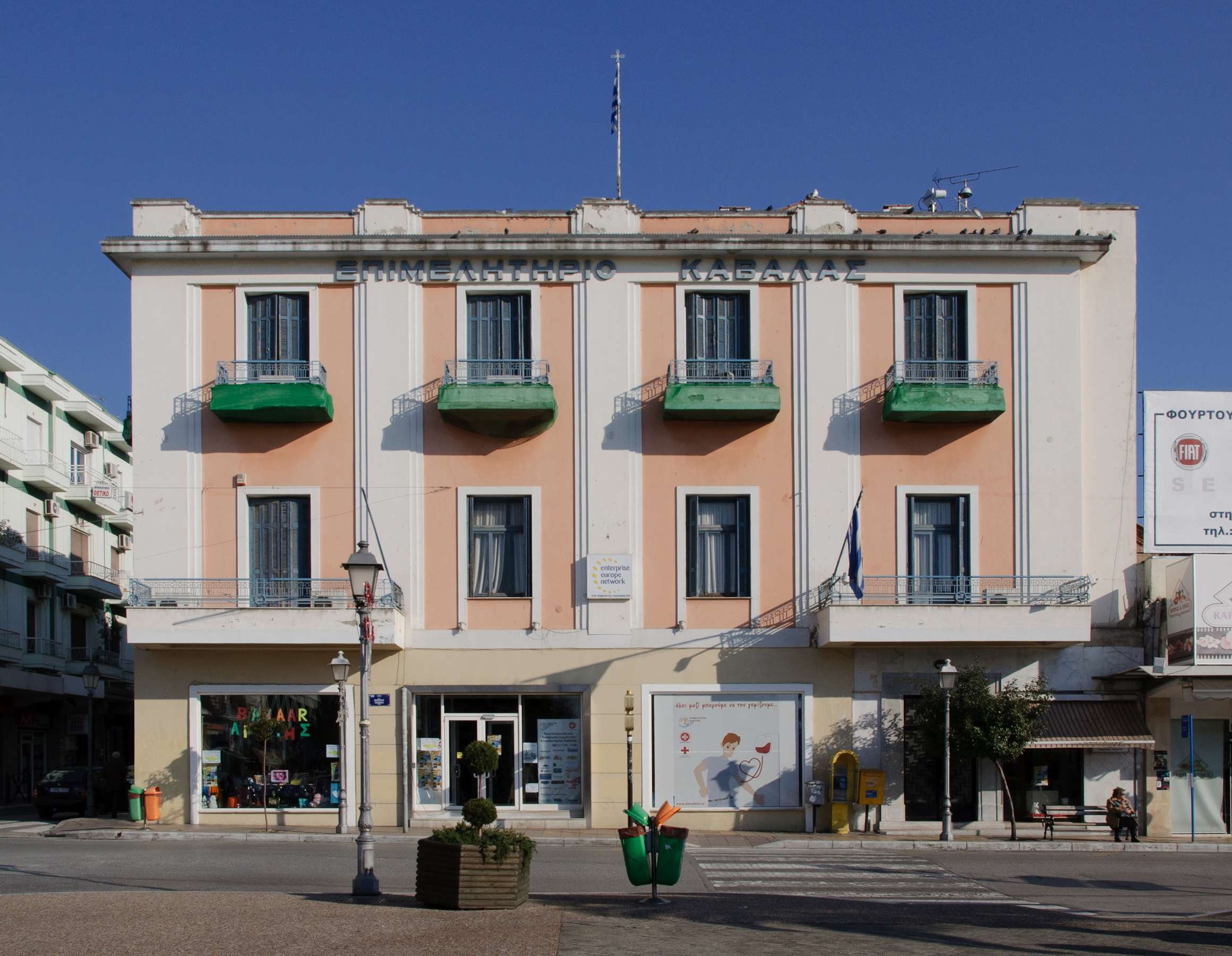
Chamber of Commerce

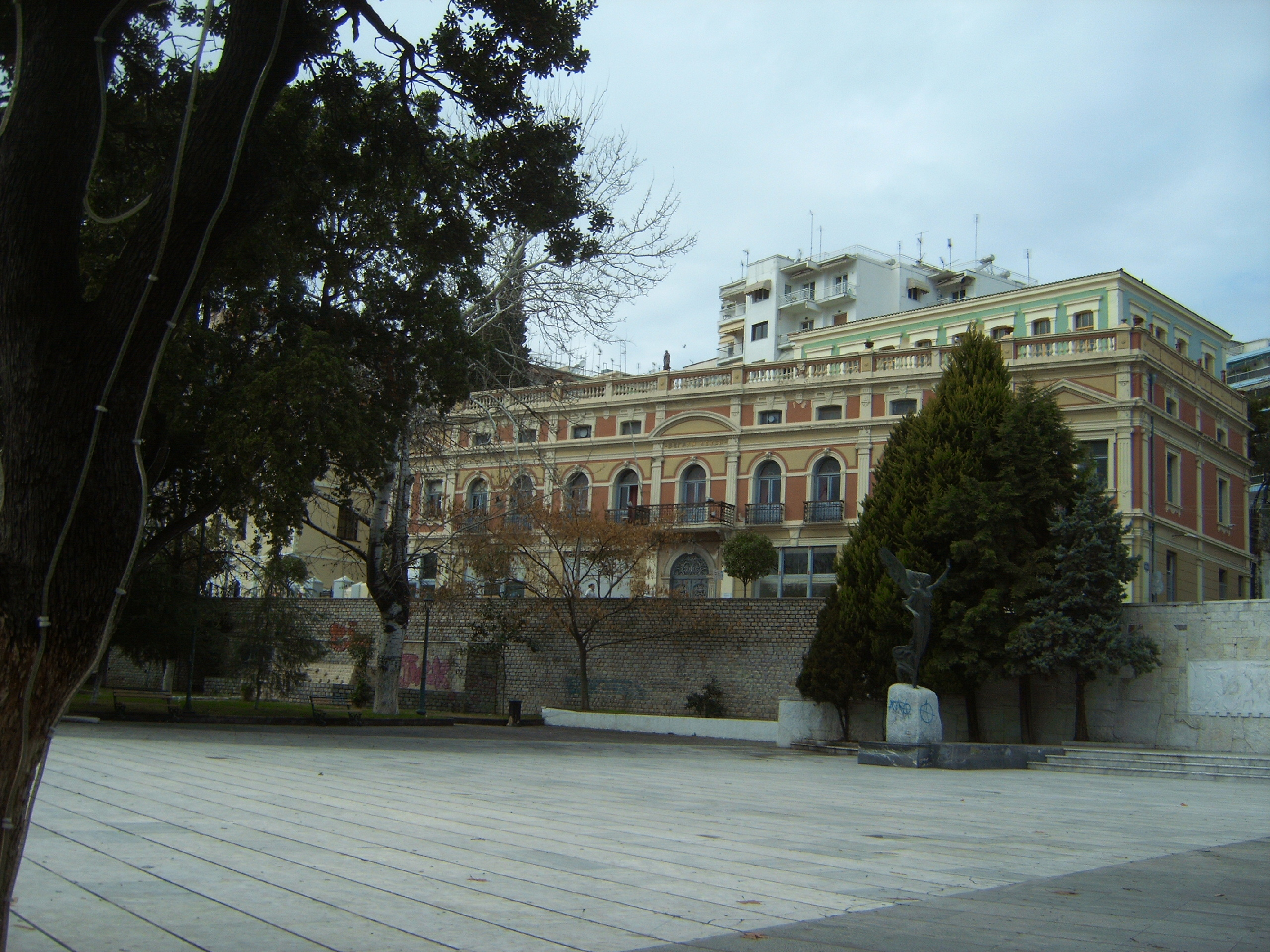
Megali Leschi (1909)

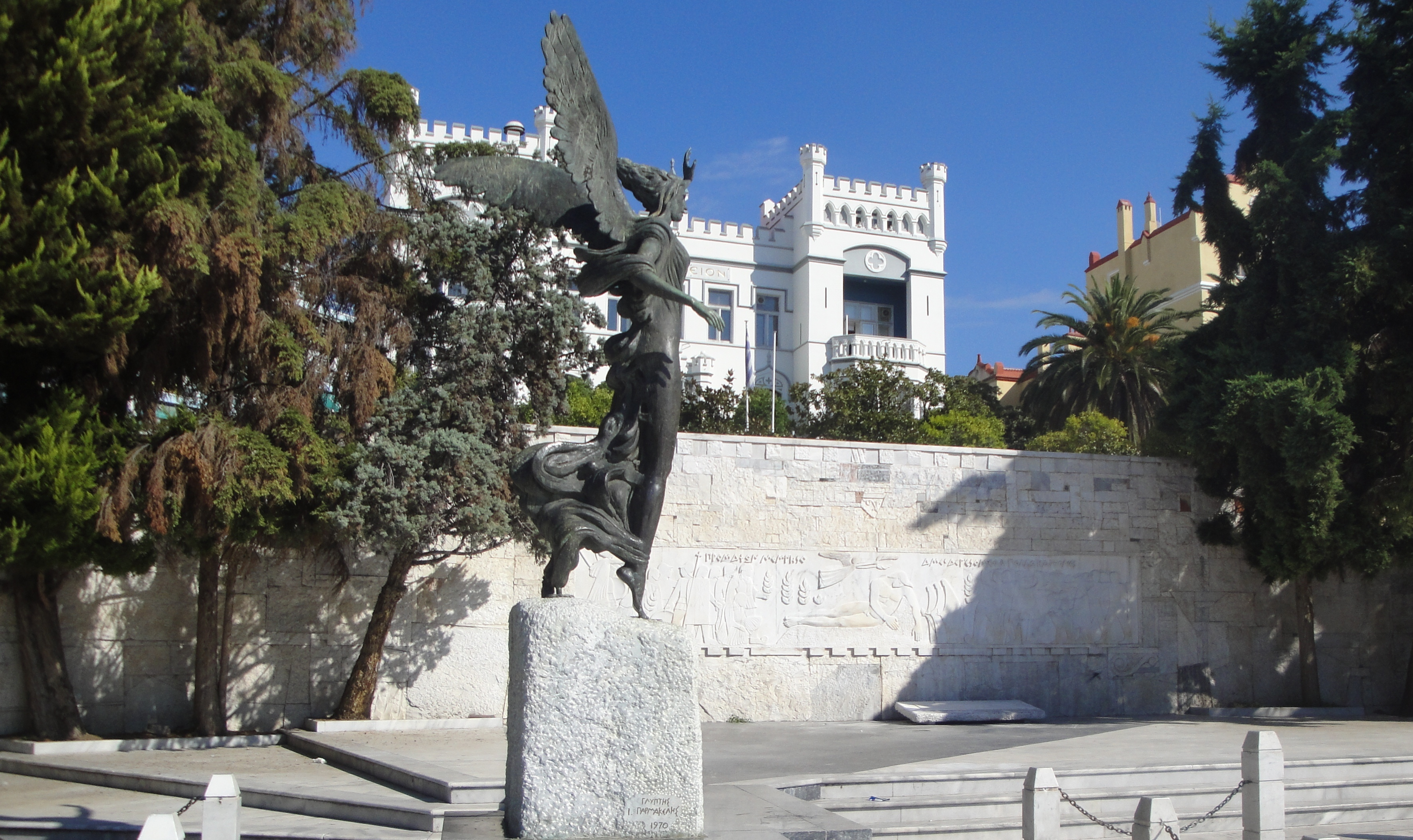
main memorial monument of Kavala

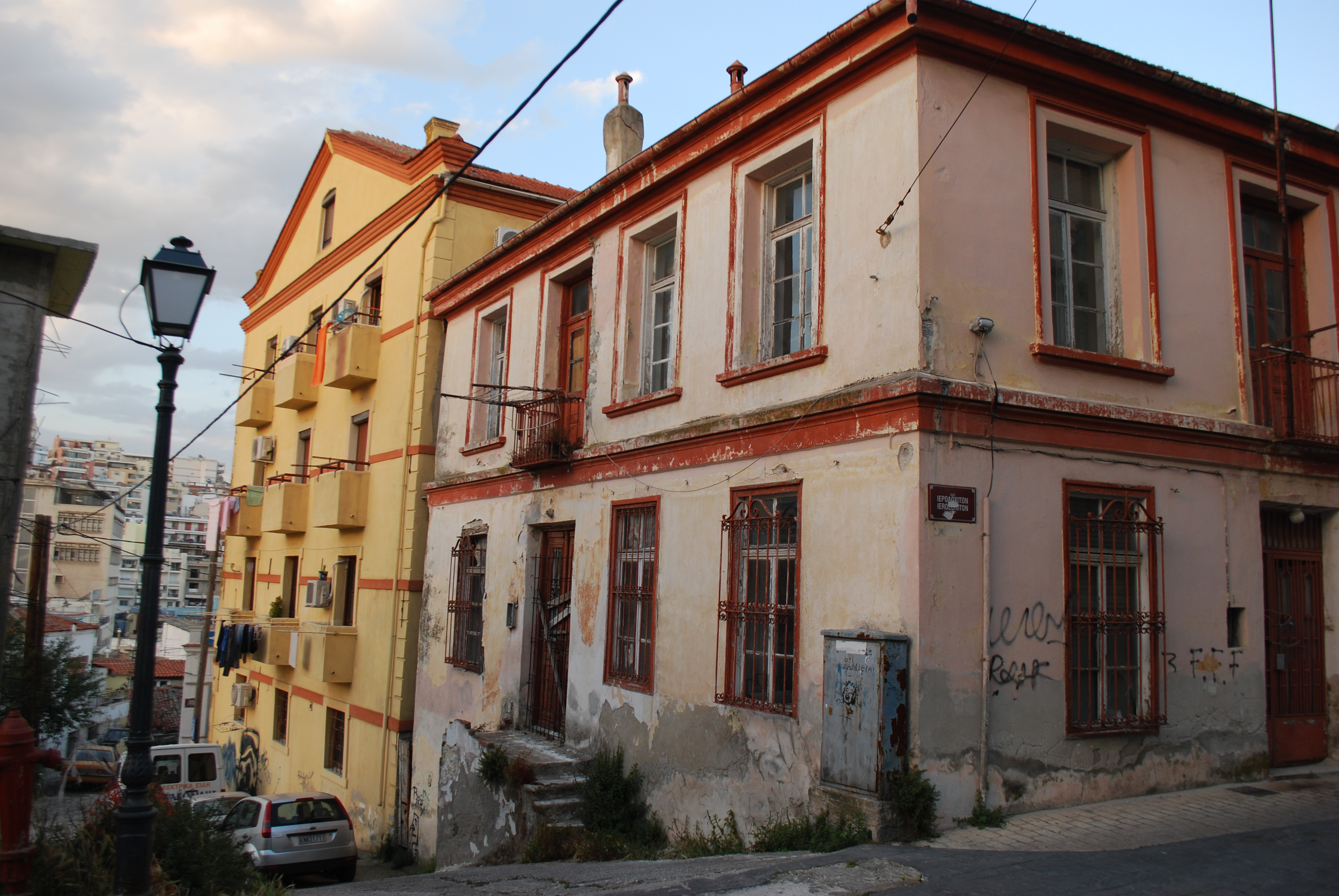
Katsoni Street at the old town

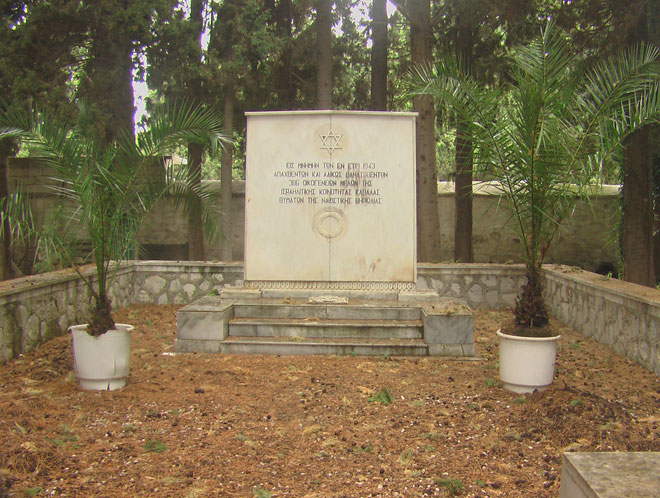
Holocaust memorial

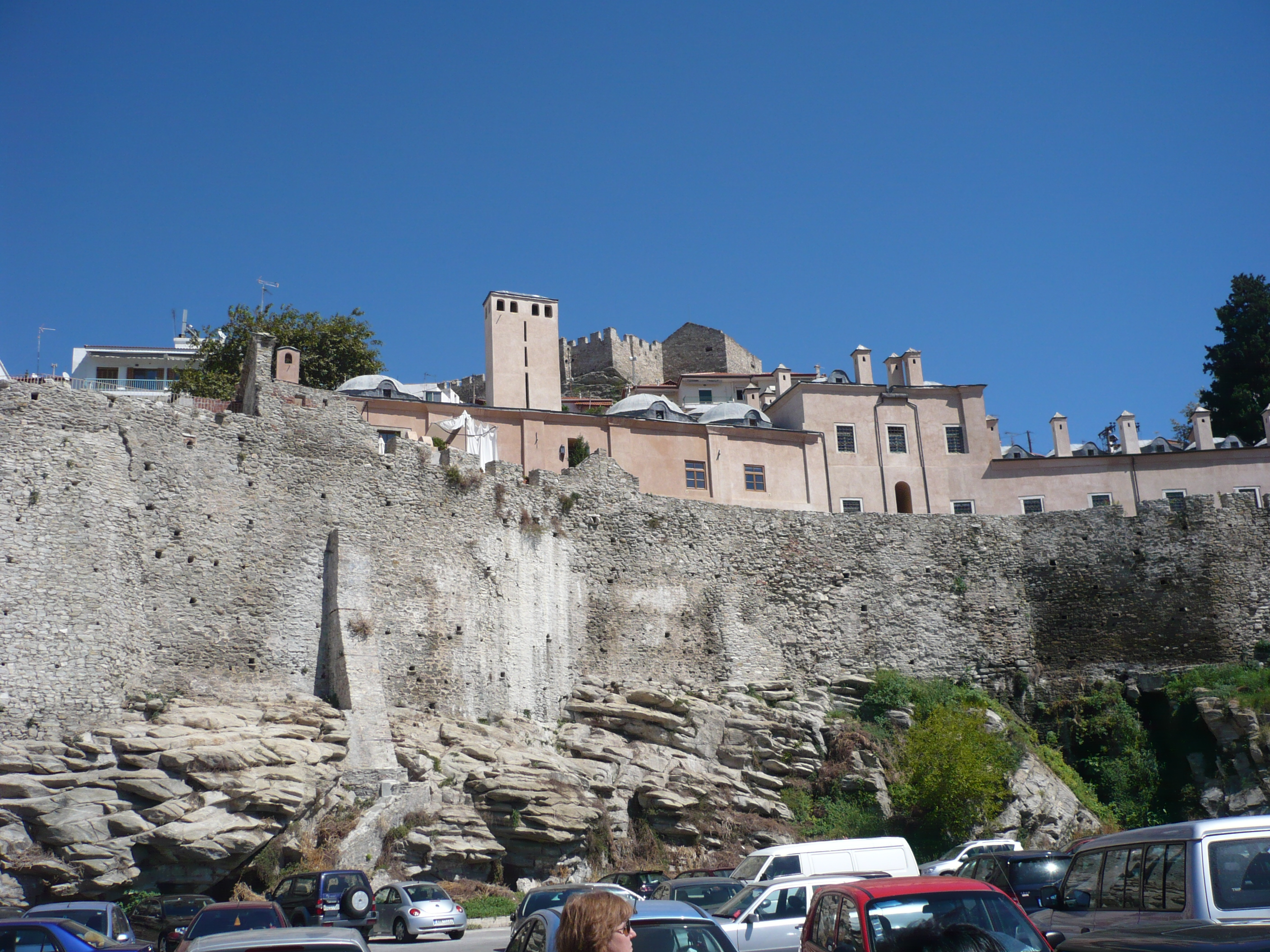
Imaret hotel

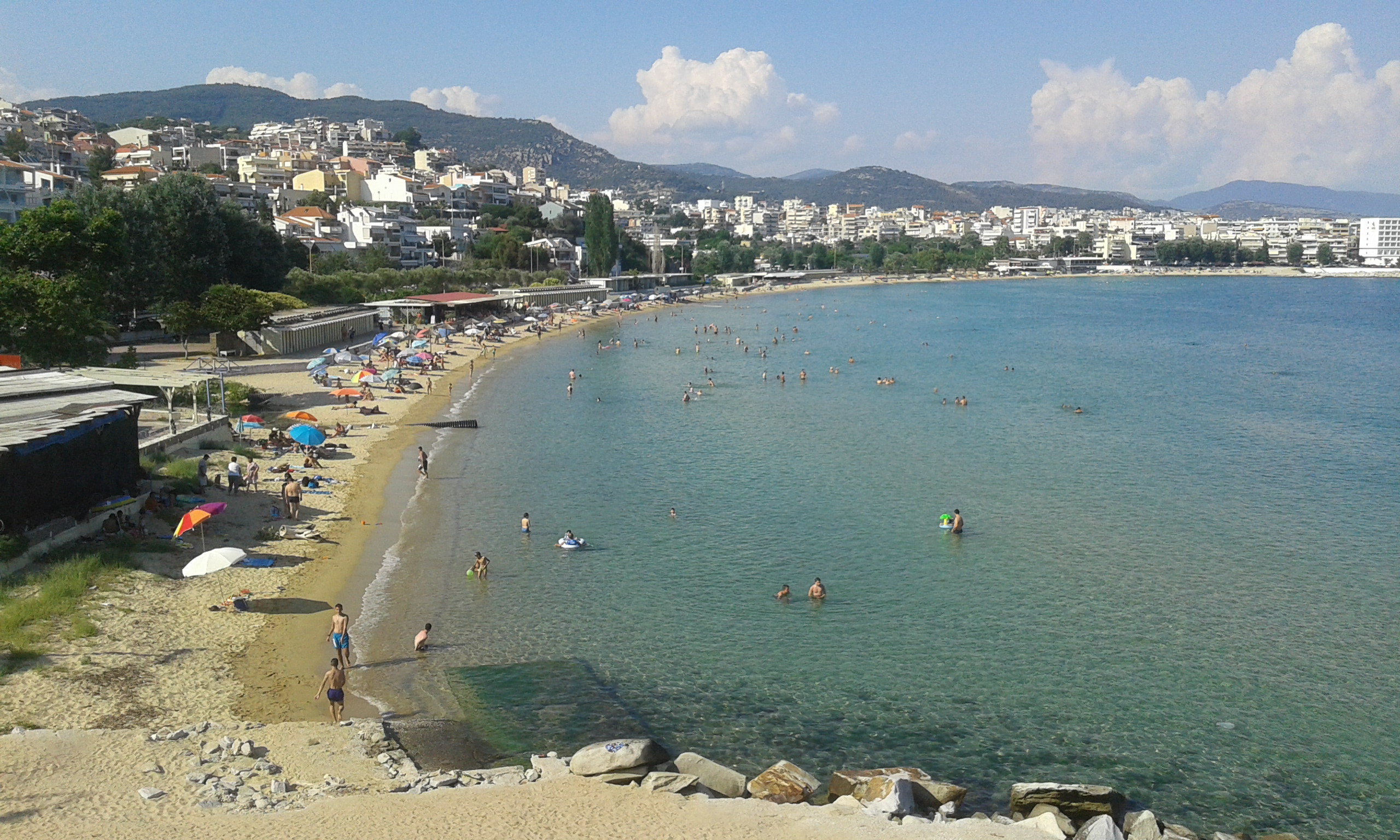
kalamitsa beach

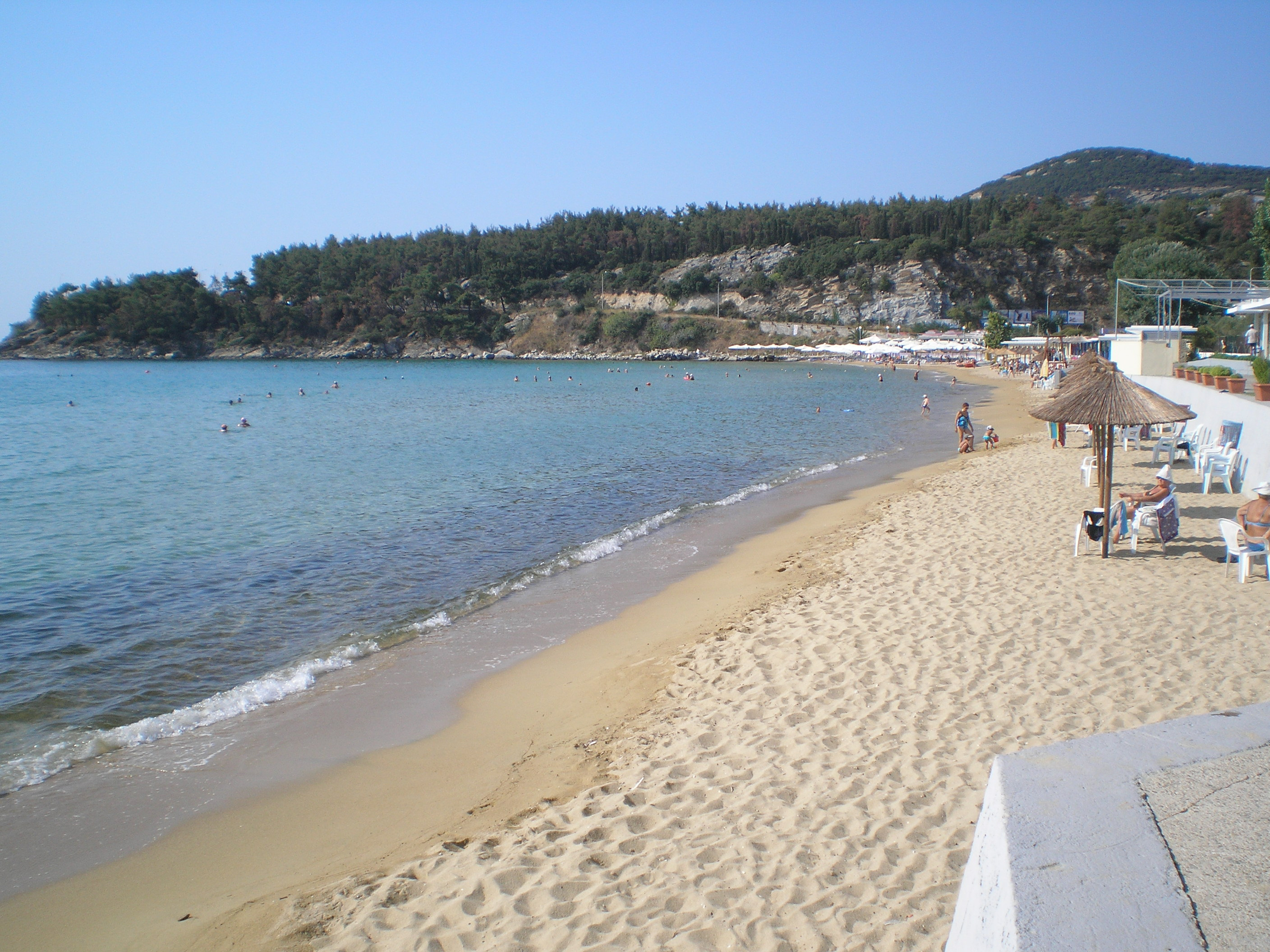
Kalamitsa beach of Kavala

Municipal swimming pool

== See also ==
- List of settlements in the Kavala regional unit
