= 2014–15 Aris Thessaloniki F.C. season =

Aris Thessaloniki
- President: Giorgos Galanos
- Manager: Dimitris Kalaitzidis (until 19 October 2014); Dimitrios Bougiouklis (from 20 October 2014 until 2 November 2014); Paulo Campos (from 3 November 2014 until 22 January 2015); Siniša Dobrašinović (from 23 January 2015 until 2 March 2015); Dimitris Kalaitzidis (from 3 March 2015)
- Stadium: Kleanthis Vikelidis Stadium
- Gamma Ethniki: 2nd
- Gamma Ethniki Cup: Quarterfinals
Home colours	Away colours

At the beginning of 2014–15 season, Aris Thessaloniki was going to play in Football League Greece as a result of the finish into the last season in the bottom of league table and the relegation. Although the team chose to play in Gamma Ethniki relieving from the huge debts it had accumulated in recent years.

Aris Thessaloniki was also going to compete in the Greek Football Cup. The draw was made and the team would play with Apollon Kalamarias. Owing to withdrawal from the Football League Greece the team lost both leg games of the First round with 3 – 0 (w/o). Finally, Aris Thessaloniki competed in the Gamma Ethniki Cup.

The club changed manager four times during the season. The season started with Dimitris Kalaitzidis as the manager of the club, but he was dismissed after the draw against Iraklis Ampelokipoi on 19 October 2014. Dimitrios Bougiouklis was the caretaker until the club hired the Brazilian Paulo Campos. Paulo Campos left the club due to the HFF's rules, which do not allow non-European managers to Gamma Ethniki's teams, and replaced by Siniša Dobrašinović. The season finished with the return of Dimitris Kalaitzidis as manager, Siniša Dobrašinović as his assistant and the club's legend Dinos Kouis as Sporting director.

== First-team squad ==
Name	Nationality	Position(s)	Date of birth (age)	Signed from
Goalkeepers
Petros Baimakis	(Greece)	GK	January 16, 1990 (aged 25)	(Greece) Aiginiakos
Dimitrios Karatziovalis	(Greece)	GK	July 22, 1975 (aged 39)	(Greece) Apollon Pontus
Giannis Fysekis	(Greece)	GK	October 10, 1985 (aged 29)	(Greece) Ethnikos Alexandroupoli
Defenders
Vasco Fernandes	(Portugal)	CB / RB / LB	November 12, 1986 (aged 28)	(Greece) Platanias
Michalis Giannitsis	(Greece)	CB / RB	February 6, 1992 (aged 23)	Club's Academy
Nikos Golias	(Greece)	CB / DM	July 29, 1993 (aged 21)	(Greece) Anagennisi Karditsa
Nikos Liolios	(Greece)	LB / LM	December 7, 1991 (aged 23)	(Greece) Kalamata
Nikos Psychogios	(Greece)	RB / RM	February 25, 1989 (aged 26)	(Greece) Doxa Drama
Miltiadis Lionis	(Greece)	LB / LM	January 13, 1990 (aged 25)	(Greece) Apollon Pontus
Kyriakos Mazoulouxis	(Greece)	CB / RB	May 1, 1997 (aged 18)	Club's Academy
Anastasios Chouzouris	(Greece)	RB / LB	May 26, 1997 (aged 18)	Club's Academy
Dimitris Samaras	(Greece)	CB	June 3, 1987 (aged 27)	(Greece) Tyrnavos 2005
Nikolaos Georgiadis	(Greece) / (Canada)	RB / DM	March 23, 1983 (aged 32)	(Greece) Levadiakos
Midfielders
Kaloudis Lemonis	(Greece)	DM / RM / RB	November 11, 1995 (aged 19)	Club's Academy
Dimitris Sounas	(Greece)	CM / AM	August 12, 1994 (aged 20)	Club's Academy
Klodian Gino	(Albania) / (Greece)	DM / CM	February 13, 1994 (aged 21)	(Greece) Olympiacos
Ilias Provatidis	(Greece)	CM	July 30, 1983 (aged 31)	(Greece) Apollon Pontus
Stavros Vasilopoulos	(Greece)	CM	February 4, 1996 (aged 19)	Club's Academy
Alexandros Chintaseli	(Greece)	AM	February 16, 1994 (aged 21)	(Greece) Doxa Drama
Alexandros Kalogeris	(Greece)	DM / CM	May 14, 1986 (aged 29)	(Greece) Panetolikos
Sidy Sagna	(Senegal)	DM / CM	February 4, 1990 (aged 25)	Free Agent
Forwards
Ilias Stavropoulos	(Greece)	RW / LW / SS	May 6, 1995 (aged 20)	Club's Academy
Andi Renja	(Albania) / (Greece)	RW	January 6, 1993 (aged 22)	Club's Academy
Giannis Dounga	(Albania) / (Greece)	LW / ST	January 10, 1995 (aged 20)	Club's Academy
Christos Symeonidis	(Greece)	LW / RW	August 12, 1997 (aged 17)	Club's Academy
Panagiotis Atmatsidis	(Greece)	RW / AM	October 22, 1986 (aged 28)	(Greece) Panegialios
Mauro Poy	(Argentina) / (Italy)	RW / LW	July 2, 1981 (aged 33)	(Greece) Panetolikos
Marios Papadopoulos	(Greece)	ST / LW / AM	December 10, 1992 (aged 22)	(Greece) Veria
Antonis Kapnidis	(Greece)	ST	August 15, 1992 (aged 22)	(Greece) Kavala
Gaël N'Lundulu	(France) / (Republic of the Congo)	LW / SS / RW	April 29, 1992 (aged 23)	(Bulgaria) Lokomotiv Sofia
Vasilis Konstantinidis	(Greece) / (Australia)	ST / RW	April 21, 1986 (aged 29)	(Greece) Doxa Drama
Stelios Nakas	(Greece)	LW / SS / RW	January 29, 1994 (aged 21)	(Greece) Skoda Xanthi

== Competitions ==
=== Overall ===
Competition	Started round	Current position / round	Final position / round	First match	Last match
Gamma Ethniki	Matchday 1	—	2nd	14 September 2014	17 May 2015
Gamma Ethniki Cup	First round	—	Quarterfinals	28 September 2014	14 January 2015

Updated to match played 17 May 2015
Source: Competitions

=== Overview ===
Competition	Record							
Competition	G	W	D	L	GF	GA	GD	Win %
Gamma Ethniki	30	22	5	3	51	12	+39	73.33
Gamma Ethniki Cup	4	3	0	1	8	4	+4	75.00
Total	34	25	5	4	59	16	+43	73.53

Updated to match played 17 May 2015
Source: Competitions

==== Managers' overview ====
===== Dimitris Kalaitzidis =====
Competition	Record							
Competition	G	W	D	L	GF	GA	GD	Win %
Gamma Ethniki	14	11	2	1	26	5	+21	78.57
Gamma Ethniki Cup	1	1	0	0	2	1	+1	100.00
Total	15	12	2	1	28	6	+22	80.00

Updated to match played 17 May 2015
Source: Competitions

===== Dimitrios Bougiouklis =====
Competition	Record							
Competition	G	W	D	L	GF	GA	GD	Win %
Gamma Ethniki	1	0	0	1	0	1	−1	0.00
Gamma Ethniki Cup	1	1	0	0	4	1	+3	100.00
Total	2	1	0	1	4	2	+2	50.00

Updated to match played 2 November 2014
Source: Competitions

===== Paulo Campos =====
Competition	Record							
Competition	G	W	D	L	GF	GA	GD	Win %
Gamma Ethniki	9	6	3	0	15	4	+11	66.67
Gamma Ethniki Cup	2	1	0	1	2	2	+0	50.00
Total	11	7	3	1	17	6	+11	63.64

Updated to match played 22 January 2015
Source: Competitions

===== Siniša Dobrašinović =====
Competition	Record							
Competition	G	W	D	L	GF	GA	GD	Win %
Gamma Ethniki	6	5	0	1	10	2	+8	83.33
Gamma Ethniki Cup	0	0	0	0	0	0	+0	—
Total	6	5	0	1	10	2	+8	83.33

Updated to match played 2 March 2015
Source: Competitions

=== Gamma Ethniki ===
==== League table ====
Pos	Team	Pld	W	D	L	GF	GA	GD	Pts	Promotion or relegation
1	Panserraikos (C, P)	30	23	5	2	52	15	+37	74	Promotion to Football League
2	Aris	30	22	5	3	51	12	+39	71	
3	Kavala	30	20	7	3	54	16	+38	67	
4	Doxa Dramas	30	15	7	8	43	26	+17	52	
5	Kampaniakos	30	13	8	9	53	34	+19	47	

Source: Hellenic Football Federation (in Greek)
Rules for classification: 1st points; 2nd head-to-head points; 3rd head-to-head goal difference
(C) Champions; (P) Promoted

==== Results summary ====
Overall								Home						Away					
Pld	W	D	L	GF	GA	GD	Pts	W	D	L	GF	GA	GD	W	D	L	GF	GA	GD
30	22	5	3	51	12	+39	71	13	1	1	32	6	+26	9	4	2	19	6	+13

Last updated: 17 May 2015.
Source: Soccerway

==== Results by matchday ====
Matchday	1	2	3	4	5	6	7	8	9	10	11	12	13	14	15	16	17	18	19	20	21	22	23	24	25	26	27	28	29	30
Ground	H	A	H	A	H	A	H	A	H	A	H	A	H	A	H	A	H	A	H	A	H	A	H	A	H	A	H	A	H	A
Result	W	L	W	D	L	W	W	W	W	D	W	W	D	D	W	W	W	W	W	L	W	W	W	W	W	W	W	W	W	D
Position	3	9	6	7	7	5	4	2	2	2	1	1	3	3	3	2	2	2	2	3	2	2	2	3	3	3	2	2	2	2

Updated to match(es) played on 17 May 2015. Source: Soccerway
A = Away; H = Home; W = Win; D = Draw; L = Loss; P = Postponed

==== Matches ====
14 September 2014 1	Aris Thessaloniki	3 – 1	Kastoria	Thessaloniki
	Michalis Giannitsis 4'; Nikos Golias 52', 61'	(in Greek)		Stadium: Kleanthis Vikelidis Stadium

21 September 2014 2	Kampaniakos	3 – 0	Aris Thessaloniki	Thessaloniki
		(in Greek)		Stadium: Kaftanzoglio Stadium

12 October 2014 3	Aris Thessaloniki	3 – 1	Ethnikos Neo Agioneri	Thessaloniki
	Marios Papadopoulos 18'; Mauro Poy 82'; Alexandros Chintaseli 90'	(in Greek)		Stadium: Kleanthis Vikelidis Stadium

19 October 2014 4	Iraklis Ampelokipoi	0 – 0	Aris Thessaloniki	Thessaloniki
		(in Greek)		Stadium: Municipal Stadium of Ampelokipi "Konstantinos Karamanlis"

2 November 2014 5	Aris Thessaloniki	0 – 1	Doxa Drama	Thessaloniki
		(in Greek)		Stadium: Kleanthis Vikelidis Stadium

10 November 2014 6	Aris Akropotamos	0 – 2	Aris Thessaloniki	Kavala
		(in Greek)	Dimitris Sounas 24', 82'	Stadium: Eleftheroupoli Stadium

16 November 2014 7	Aris Thessaloniki	1 – 0	Anagennisi Giannitsa	Thessaloniki
	Panagiotis Atmatsidis 56'	(in Greek)		Stadium: Kleanthis Vikelidis Stadium

30 November 2014 8	Vyzantio Kokkinochoma	0 – 2	Aris Thessaloniki	Kavala
		(in Greek)	Mauro Poy 23'; Antonis Kapnidis 43'	Stadium: Anthi Karagianni Stadium

7 December 2014 9	Aris Thessaloniki	2 – 1	Apollon Arnaia	Thessaloniki
	Nikos Golias 6'; Mauro Poy 23'	(in Greek)		Stadium: Kleanthis Vikelidis Stadium

14 December 2014 10	Panserraikos	2 – 2	Aris Thessaloniki	Serres
		(in Greek)	Panagiotis Atmatsidis 16'; Mauro Poy 86' (pen.)	Stadium: Serres Municipal Stadium

17 December 2014 11	Aris Thessaloniki	2 – 0	Thyella Filotas	Thessaloniki
	Mauro Poy 35' (pen.), 64' (pen.)	(in Greek)		Stadium: Kleanthis Vikelidis Stadium

21 December 2014 12	Evros Soufli	0 – 3	Aris Thessaloniki	Soufli
		(in Greek)	Antonis Kapnidis 55', 73'; Mauro Poy 85'	Stadium: Dimitris Bakirtzis Municipal Stadium

11 January 2015 13	Aris Thessaloniki	1 – 1	Ethnikos Alexandroupoli	Thessaloniki
	Antonis Kapnidis 90+1'	(in Greek)		Stadium: Kleanthis Vikelidis Stadium

18 January 2015 14	Kavala	0 – 0	Aris Thessaloniki	Kavala
		(in Greek)		Stadium: Anthi Karagianni Stadium

28 January 2015 15	Aris Thessaloniki	3 – 1	Orfeas Eleftheroupoli	Thessaloniki
	Mauro Poy 3'; Antonis Kapnidis 39'; Gaël N'Lundulu 69'	(in Greek)		Stadium: Kleanthis Vikelidis Stadium

1 February 2015 16	Kastoria	0 – 1	Aris Thessaloniki	Kastoria
		(in Greek)	Marios Papadopoulos 3'	Stadium: Municipal Stadium of Kastoria

9 February 2015 17	Aris Thessaloniki	2 – 0	Kampaniakos	Thessaloniki
	Marios Papadopoulos 22'; Mauro Poy 80'	(in Greek)		Stadium: Kleanthis Vikelidis Stadium

15 February 2015 18	Ethnikos Neo Agioneri	0 – 1	Aris Thessaloniki	Kilkis
		(in Greek)	Vasco Fernandes 77'	Stadium: Municipal Stadium of Kilkis

21 February 2015 19	Aris Thessaloniki	3 – 0	Iraklis Ampelokipoi	Thessaloniki
	Vasco Fernandes 60'; Antonis Kapnidis 66'; Mauro Poy 84'	(in Greek)		Stadium: Kleanthis Vikelidis Stadium

1 March 2015 20	Doxa Drama	1 – 0	Aris Thessaloniki	Drama
		(in Greek)		Stadium: Doxa Drama Stadium

7 March 2015 21	Aris Thessaloniki	2 – 0	Aris Akropotamos	Thessaloniki
	Antonis Kapnidis 26'; Vasilis Konstantinidis 88'	(in Greek)		Stadium: Kleanthis Vikelidis Stadium

15 March 2015 22	Anagennisi Giannitsa	0 – 4	Aris Thessaloniki	Giannitsa
		(in Greek)	Dimitris Samaras 39'; Gaël N'Lundulu 55'; Stelios Nakas 74'; Dimitris Sounas 88'	Stadium: Municipal Stadium of Giannitsa

22 March 2015 23	Aris Thessaloniki	5 – 0	Vyzantio Kokkinochoma	Thessaloniki
	Mauro Poy 32', 49', 64'; Antonis Kapnidis 66'; Stelios Nakas 90'	(in Greek)		Stadium: Kleanthis Vikelidis Stadium

29 March 2015 24	Apollon Arnaia	0 – 1	Aris Thessaloniki	Arnaia
		(in Greek)	Dimitris Samaras 84'	Stadium: Arnaia Stadium "Apollon"

4 April 2015 25	Aris Thessaloniki	1 – 0	Panserraikos	Thessaloniki
	Nikos Golias 50'	(in Greek)		Stadium: Kleanthis Vikelidis Stadium

19 April 2015 26	Thyella Filotas	0 – 2	Aris Thessaloniki	Florina
		(in Greek)	Antonis Kapnidis 16'; Gaël N'Lundulu 33'	Stadium: Florina Municipal Stadium

26 April 2015 27	Aris Thessaloniki	3 – 0	Evros Soufli	Thessaloniki
	Antonis Kapnidis 41'; Dimitris Samaras 45+2'; Gaël N'Lundulu 90'	(in Greek)		Stadium: Kleanthis Vikelidis Stadium

3 May 2015 28	Ethnikos Alexandroupoli	0 – 1	Aris Thessaloniki	Alexandroupoli
		(in Greek)	Gaël N'Lundulu 40'	Stadium: Fotis Kosmas Stadium

10 May 2015 29	Aris Thessaloniki	1 – 0	Kavala	Thessaloniki
	Vasilis Konstantinidis 89'	(in Greek)		Stadium: Kleanthis Vikelidis Stadium

17 May 2015 30	Orfeas Eleftheroupoli	0 – 0	Aris Thessaloniki	Eleftheroupoli
		(in Greek)		Stadium: Eleftheroupoli Stadium

=== Gamma Ethniki Cup ===
==== First round ====
In first round of the competition, the clubs in each Group competed against each other in single matches (overtime and penalties applied) until two clubs were declared Group winners. The competing pairs were selected as a result of random drawing that took place on 5 September 2014. The match days of the First Round were set on 28 September 2014 for Match-Day 1, 26 October 2014 for Match-Day 2 and 10 December 2014 for Match-Day 3.

===== Match-day 1 =====
28 September 2014 Match-day 1	Thyella Filotas	1 – 2	Aris Thessaloniki	Florina
		https://www.pressaris.gr/pressaris-live-%CE%B8%CF%8D%CE%B5%CE%BB%CE%BB%CE%B1-%CF%86%CE%B9%CE%BB%CF%8E%CF%84%CE%B1-%CE%AC%CF%81%CE%B7%CF%82-1530/ (in Greek)	Dimitris Sounas 18'; Antonis Kapnidis 86'	Stadium: Florina Municipal Stadium

===== Match-day 2 =====
25 October 2014 Match-day 2	Aris Thessaloniki	4 – 1	Kastoria	Thessaloniki
	Ilias Provatidis 48'; Antonis Kapnidis 56'; Dimitris Sounas 80'; Alexandros Chintaseli 86'	https://www.pressaris.gr/pressaris-live-%CE%AC%CF%81%CE%B7%CF%82-%CE%BA%CE%B1%CF%83%CF%84%CE%BF%CF%81%CE%B9%CE%AC-1530/ (in Greek)		Stadium: Kleanthis Vikelidis Stadium

===== Match-day 3 =====
10 December 2014 Match-day 3	Panserraikos	1 – 2	Aris Thessaloniki	Serres
		https://www.pressaris.gr/pressaris-live-%CF%80%CE%B1%CE%BD%CF%83%CE%B5%CF%81%CF%81%CE%B1%CF%8A%CE%BA%CF%8C%CF%82-%CE%AC%CF%81%CE%B7%CF%82-1800/ (in Greek)	Alexandros Chintaseli 8'; Andi Renja 20'	Stadium: Serres Municipal Stadium

==== Quarterfinals ====
In the Second Round of the competition (Quarterfinals), the 8 Group winners competed against each other in single knock-out matches at the home ground of the club favored by the draw. All matches were held on 14 January 2015.

14 January 2015 Quarterfinal	Aris Thessaloniki	0 – 1	Dotieas Agia	Thessaloniki
		https://www.gazzetta.gr/football/article/690612/apokleismos-apo-kypello-gia-ton-ari (in Greek)		Stadium: Kleanthis Vikelidis Stadium

== Squad statistics ==
=== Appearances ===
As of match played 17 May 2015

Position	Nat.	Player	Gamma Ethniki	Gamma Ethniki Cup	Total
GK	(Greece)	Petros Baimakis	3	3	6
GK	(Greece)	Dimitrios Karatziovalis	13	1	14
GK	(Greece)	Giannis Fysekis	16	0	16
DF	(Portugal)	Vasco Fernandes	24	3	27
DF	(Greece)	Michalis Giannitsis	10	2	12
DF	(Greece)	Nikos Golias	23	3	26
DF	(Greece)	Nikos Liolios	24	3	27
DF	(Greece)	Nikos Psychogios	7	2	9
DF	(Greece)	Miltiadis Lionis	15	3	18
DF	(Greece)	Kyriakos Mazoulouxis	1	0	1
DF	(Greece)	Anastasios Chouzouris	0	2	2
DF	(Greece)	Dimitris Samaras	16	0	16
DF	(Greece) / (Canada)	Nikolaos Georgiadis	10	0	10
MF	(Greece)	Kaloudis Lemonis	10	2	12
MF	(Greece)	Dimitris Sounas	25	3	28
MF	(Albania) / (Greece)	Klodian Gino	12	2	14
MF	(Greece)	Ilias Provatidis	12	1	13
MF	(Greece)	Stavros Vasilopoulos	3	2	5
MF	(Greece)	Alexandros Chintaseli	8	4	12
MF	(Greece)	Alexandros Kalogeris	14	0	14
MF	(Senegal)	Sidy Sagna	12	0	12
FW	(Greece)	Ilias Stavropoulos	11	4	15
FW	(Albania) / (Greece)	Andi Renja	11	3	14
FW	(Albania) / (Greece)	Giannis Dounga	5	3	8
FW	(Greece)	Christos Symeonidis	0	2	2
FW	(Greece)	Panagiotis Atmatsidis	8	1	9
FW	(Argentina) / (Italy)	Mauro Poy	27	2	29
FW	(Greece)	Marios Papadopoulos	20	2	22
FW	(Greece)	Antonis Kapnidis	30	2	32
FW	(France) / (Republic of the Congo)	Gaël N'Lundulu	15	0	15
FW	(Greece) / (Australia)	Vasilis Konstantinidis	9	0	9
FW	(Greece)	Stelios Nakas	14	0	14
Total			30	4	34

=== Goals ===
As of match played 17 May 2015

Ranking	Position	Nat.	Player	Gamma Ethniki	Gamma Ethniki Cup	Total
1	FW	(Argentina) / (Italy)	Mauro Poy	13	0	13
2	FW	(Greece)	Antonis Kapnidis	10	2	12
3	FW	(France) / (Republic of the Congo)	Gaël N'Lundulu	5	0	5
3	MF	(Greece)	Dimitris Sounas	3	2	5
5	DF	(Greece)	Nikos Golias	4	0	4
6	DF	(Greece)	Dimitris Samaras	3	0	3
6	FW	(Greece)	Marios Papadopoulos	3	0	3
6	MF	(Greece)	Alexandros Chintaseli	1	2	3
9	FW	(Greece)	Panagiotis Atmatsidis	2	0	2
9	DF	(Portugal)	Vasco Fernandes	2	0	2
9	FW	(Greece) / (Australia)	Vasilis Konstantinidis	2	0	2
9	FW	(Greece)	Stelios Nakas	2	0	2
13	DF	(Greece)	Michalis Giannitsis	1	0	1
13	MF	(Greece)	Ilias Provatidis	0	1	1
13	MF	(Albania)	Andi Renja	0	1	1
Own Goals				0	0	0
Total				51	8	59

== Kit ==
2014

Supplier: Macron
Sponsor(s): Swedish Systems Security

Home

Source: gazzetta.gr

October–December

Supplier: Stabomania
Sponsor(s): Swedish Systems Security

Home	Away

Source: pamesports.gr

2015

Supplier: No
Sponsor(s): No

Home	Away
