= 2015–16 Aris Thessaloniki F.C. season =

Aris Thessaloniki
- President: Theodoros A. Karipidis
- Manager: Nikos Anastopoulos
- Stadium: Kleanthis Vikelidis Stadium
- Gamma Ethniki: 1st
- Gamma Ethniki Cup: Not Held
- EPSM Cup: Phase E
- Top goalscorer: League: Antonis Kapnidis (21); All: Antonis Kapnidis (21)
Home colours	Away colours

The 2015–16 season was Aris Thessaloniki the second in Gamma Ethniki (3rd level). The team finished 1st with a 21-point difference from the second club and was promoted to Football League, the greek second division.

They was also compete in the Macedonia Football Clubs Association Cup with its U17 team, where eliminated in the Phase E by Niki Mesimeri.

On 17 September 2015, Nikos Anastopoulos appointed as manager.

== First-team squad ==
Name	Nationality	Position(s)	Date of birth (age)	Signed from
Goalkeepers
Xavi Ginard	(Spain)	GK	October 11, 1986 (aged 29)	(Greece) Veria
Giannis Siderakis	(Greece)	GK	November 16, 1987 (aged 28)	(Greece) AEL Kalloni
Petros Baimakis	(Greece)	GK	January 16, 1990 (aged 26)	(Greece) Aiginiakos
Defenders
Dimitris Samaras	(Greece)	CB	June 3, 1987 (aged 28)	(Greece) Tyrnavos 2005
Kyriakos Mazoulouxis	(Greece)	CB / RB	May 1, 1997 (aged 19)	Club's Academy
Nikolaos Georgiadis	(Greece) / (Canada)	RB / DM	March 23, 1983 (aged 33)	(Greece) Levadiakos
Christos Intzidis	(Greece)	CB / LB	January 9, 1993 (aged 23)	(Greece) Panachaiki
Raúl Bravo	(Spain)	CB / LB	April 14, 1981 (aged 35)	(Greece) Veria
Paschalis Melissas	(Greece)	CB / LB	March 9, 1982 (aged 34)	(Greece) AEL
Nikos Tsoumanis	(Greece)	LB	June 8, 1990 (aged 25)	(Greece) PAE Kerkyra
Konstantinos Samaropoulos	(Greece)	CB	January 24, 1991 (aged 25)	(Greece) Apollon Pontus
Midfielders
Andreas Tatos	(Greece)	AM / CM	May 11, 1989 (aged 27)	(Greece) Veria
Alexandros Kalogeris	(Greece)	DM / CM	May 14, 1986 (aged 30)	(Greece) Panetolikos
Charalampos Pavlidis	(Greece)	AM / CM	May 6, 1991 (aged 25)	(Greece) Veria
Vasilios Rovas	(Greece)	DM / CB	January 6, 1984 (aged 32)	(Greece) AEK Athens
Konstantinos Kaznaferis	(Greece)	DM	June 22, 1987 (aged 28)	(Greece) Ergotelis
Forwards
Sergio Koke	(Spain)	ST / SS	April 27, 1983 (aged 33)	(Greece) Veria
Mauro Poy	(Argentina) / (Italy)	RW / LW	July 2, 1981 (aged 34)	(Greece) Panetolikos
Markos Dounis	(Greece)	RW / LW	May 9, 1992 (aged 24)	(Greece) AEK Athens
Leonidas Kyvelidis	(Greece)	ST	February 8, 1986 (aged 30)	(Greece) Panachaiki
Antonis Kapnidis	(Greece)	ST	August 15, 1992 (aged 23)	(Greece) Kavala
Gaël N'Lundulu	(France) / (Republic of the Congo)	LW / SS / RW	April 29, 1992 (aged 24)	(Bulgaria) Lokomotiv Sofia
Stefanos Dogos	(Greece)	LW / RW	May 5, 1994 (aged 22)	(Greece) Veria
Vasilis Konstantinidis	(Greece) / (Australia)	ST / RW	April 21, 1986 (aged 30)	(Greece) Doxa Drama
Paschalis Voutsias	(Greece)	RW	March 23, 1990 (aged 26)	Free Agent
Dimitrios Andreakos	(Greece)	LW	April 14, 1999 (aged 17)	Club's Academy
Ilias Boulgouridis	(Greece)	ST	January 29, 1999 (aged 17)	Club's Academy

== Competitions ==
=== Overall ===
Competition	Started round	Current position / round	Final position / round	First match	Last match
Gamma Ethniki	Matchday 2	—	1st	3 October 2015	15 May 2016
Gamma Ethniki Cup^{1}	—	—			
EPSM Cup^{2}	Phase E	—	Phase E	9 December 2015	9 December 2015

Updated to match played 15 May 2016
Source: Competitions

- ^{1} The Gamma Ethniki Cup did not hold that season
- ^{2} In the EPSM Cup Aris Thessaloniki used the U17 team (players and manager)

=== Overview ===
Competition	Record							
Competition	G	W	D	L	GF	GA	GD	Win %
Gamma Ethniki	32	28	3	1	76	17	+59	87.50
Gamma Ethniki Cup^{1}	0	0	0	0	0	0	+0	—
EPSM Cup^{2}	1	0	0	1	1	2	−1	0.00
Total	33	28	3	2	77	19	+58	84.85

Updated to match played 15 May 2016
Source: Competitions

- ^{1} The Gamma Ethniki Cup did not hold that season
- ^{2} In the EPSM Cup Aris Thessaloniki used the U17 team (players and manager)

=== Gamma Ethniki ===
==== League table ====
Pos	Team	Pld	W	D	L	GF	GA	GD	Pts	Promotion or relegation
1	Aris (C, P)	32	28	3	1	76	17	+59	87	Promotion to Football League
2	Nestos Chrysoupoli	32	21	3	8	66	35	+31	66	
3	Doxa Dramas	32	18	9	5	47	24	+23	63	
4	Kavala	32	16	10	6	53	24	+29	58	
5	Apollon Kalamarias	32	16	5	11	46	29	+17	53	

Source: Hellenic Football Federation (in Greek)
Rules for classification: 1st points; 2nd head-to-head points; 3rd head-to-head goal difference
(C) Champions; (P) Promoted

==== Results summary ====
Overall								Home						Away					
Pld	W	D	L	GF	GA	GD	Pts	W	D	L	GF	GA	GD	W	D	L	GF	GA	GD
32	28	3	1	76	17	+59	87	15	1	0	44	7	+37	13	2	1	32	10	+22

Last updated: 15 May 2016.
Source: Soccerway

==== Results by matchday ====
Matchday	1	2	3	4	5	6	7	8	9	10	11	12	13	14	15	16	17	18	19	20	21	22	23	24	25	26	27	28	29	30	31	32	33	34
Ground	NG	H	A	H	A	H	A	H	A	A	H	A	H	A	H	A	H	NG	A	H	Α	H	A	H	A	H	H	A	H	A	H	A	H	A
Result	NG	W	W	W	W	W	D	W	W	W	W	W	W	W	W	L	W	NG	W	W	W	D	W	W	W	W	W	W	W	W	W	D	W	W
Position	10	5	5	2	1	1	1	1	1	1	1	1	1	1	1	1	1	1	1	1	1	1	1	1	1	1	1	1	1	1	1	1	1	1

Updated to match(es) played on 15 May 2016. Source: Soccerway
A = Away; H = Home; W = Win; D = Draw; L = Loss; P = Postponed; NG = No Game

==== Matches ====
27 September 2015 1	No Game

3 October 2015 2	Aris Thessaloniki	2 – 0	Apollon Krya Vrysi	Thessaloniki
	Antonis Kapnidis 46'; Markos Dounis 90+1'	https://www.sport24.gr/football/premiera-me-niki-gia-ton-ari.8315499.html (in Greek)		Stadium: Kleanthis Vikelidis Stadium

11 October 2015 3	Kavala	1 – 2	Aris Thessaloniki	Kavala
		https://www.gazzetta.gr/football/article/814513/kavala-aris-1-2 (in Greek)	Antonis Kapnidis 62'; Mauro Poy 83'	Stadium: Anthi Karagianni Stadium

14 October 2015 4	Aris Thessaloniki	3 – 0	Iraklis Ampelokipoi	Thessaloniki
	Antonis Kapnidis 6'; Charalampos Pavlidis 15'; Konstantinos Barbas 37' (o.g.)	https://www.gazzetta.gr/football/article/816068/aris-iraklis-ampelokipon-3-0?page=3 (in Greek)		Stadium: Kleanthis Vikelidis Stadium

18 October 2015 5	Ethnikos Neo Agioneri	1 – 2	Aris Thessaloniki	Kilkis
		https://www.sport24.gr/football/katharise-o-kyvelidis-gia-ton-ari-niki-me-2-1-sto-kilkis.8317511.html (in Greek)	Markos Dounis 34'; Leonidas Kyvelidis 76'	Stadium: Municipal Stadium of Kilkis

24 October 2015 6	Aris Thessaloniki	2 – 0	APE Langadas	Thessaloniki
	Antonis Kapnidis 33' (pen.); Markos Dounis 36'	https://www.sport24.gr/football/o-aris-ekane-to-5x5-2-0-5-tin-ape-lagkada.8318381.html (in Greek)		Stadium: Kleanthis Vikelidis Stadium

1 November 2015 7	Nestos Chrysoupoli	1 – 1	Aris Thessaloniki	Chrysoupoli
		https://www.gazzetta.gr/football/article/825200/toy-halase-seri (in Greek)	Antonis Kapnidis 75'	Stadium: Municipal Stadium of Chrysoupoli

4 November 2015 8	Aris Thessaloniki	3 – 1	Apollon Pontus	Thessaloniki
	Andreas Tatos 22'; Markos Dounis 55'; Gaël N'Lundulu 85'	https://www.sport24.gr/football/epistrofi-stis-nikes-gia-ari-3-1-ton-apollona-kalamarias.8319848.html (in Greek)		Stadium: Kleanthis Vikelidis Stadium

8 November 2015 9	Kozani	0 – 1	Aris Thessaloniki	Kozani
		https://www.sport24.gr/football/me-n-loyntoyloy-o-aris-1-0-tin-kozani.8320406.html (in Greek)	Gaël N'Lundulu 73'	Stadium: Kozani Stadium

15 November 2015 10	Serres	2 – 3	Aris Thessaloniki	Serres
		https://www.gazzetta.gr/football/article/832251/ethnikos-serron-aris-2-3 (in Greek)	Antonis Kapnidis 26', 85'; Andreas Tatos 67'	Stadium: Serres Municipal Stadium

22 November 2015 11	Aris Thessaloniki	3 – 0	Ethnikos Alexandroupoli	Thessaloniki
	Antonis Kapnidis 35', 71'; Leonidas Kyvelidis 90'	https://www.sport24.gr/football/epistrofi-koke-o-aris-3-0-ton-ethniko-alexandroypolis.8322267.html (in Greek)		Stadium: Kleanthis Vikelidis Stadium

25 November 2015 12	Eordaikos	1 – 2	Aris Thessaloniki	Ptolemaida
		https://www.sport24.gr/football/perase-apo-tin-ptolemaida-o-aris-2-1-ton-eordaiko.8322662.html (in Greek)	Andreas Tatos 14' (pen.); Markos Dounis 45'	Stadium: Municipal Ptolemaida Stadium

29 November 2015 13	Aris Thessaloniki	2 – 1	Kampaniakos	Thessaloniki
	Antonis Kapnidis 43'; Andreas Tatos 84'	https://www.gazzetta.gr/football/article/839401/aris-kampaniakos-2-1 (in Greek)		Stadium: Kleanthis Vikelidis Stadium

6 December 2015 14	Vyzantio Kokkinochoma	0 – 1	Aris Thessaloniki	Kavala
		https://www.sport24.gr/football/an-kai-kakos-o-aris-kerdise-1-0-to-vyzantio-kokkinochomatos.8324065.html (in Greek)	Christos Intzidis 33'	Stadium: Kokkinochoma Stadium

13 December 2015 15	Aris Thessaloniki	4 – 1	Thyella Filotas	Thessaloniki
	Andreas Tatos 20'; Sergio Koke 45'; Markos Dounis 48'; Christos Intzidis 69'	https://www.sport24.gr/football/tessara-toy-ari-stin-thyellas-filota.8325005.html (in Greek)		Stadium: Kleanthis Vikelidis Stadium

16 December 2015 16	Doxa Drama	1 – 0	Aris Thessaloniki	Drama
		https://www.sport24.gr/football/proti-itta-o-aris-echase-1-0-apo-ti-doxa-dramas.8325416.html (in Greek)		Stadium: Doxa Drama Stadium

13 December 2015 17	Aris Thessaloniki	5 – 0	Evros Soufli	Thessaloniki
	Sergio Koke 19'; Leonidas Kyvelidis 34'; Andreas Tatos 38'; Mauro Poy 76'; Vasilis Konstantinidis 86'	https://www.gazzetta.gr/football/article/849816/aris-evros-soyflioy-5-0 (in Greek)		Stadium: Kleanthis Vikelidis Stadium

10 January 2016 18	No Game

17 January 2016 19	Apollon Krya Vrysi	1 – 2	Aris Thessaloniki	Krya Vrysi
		https://www.sport24.gr/football/perase-me-anatropi-o-aris-2-1-ton-apollona-kryas-vrysis.8390148.html (in Greek)	Antonis Kapnidis 2'; Markos Dounis 33'	Stadium: Municipal Stadium "Ioannis Tserkezidis"

24 January 2016 20	Aris Thessaloniki	3 – 0	Kavala	Thessaloniki
	Andreas Tatos 38' (pen.); Markos Dounis 45'; Vasilios Rovas 64'	https://www.gazzetta.gr/football/article/866393/kaval-aris (in Greek)		Stadium: Kleanthis Vikelidis Stadium

13 February 2016 21	Iraklis Ampelokipoi	0 – 3	Aris Thessaloniki	Thessaloniki
		https://www.sport24.gr/football/patise-gkazi-o-aris-3-0-ton-irakli-ampelokipon.8393677.html (in Greek)	Christos Intzidis 5'; Leonidas Kyvelidis 12'; Alexandros Kalogeris 71'	Stadium: Municipal Stadium of Ampelokipoi

21 February 2016 22	Aris Thessaloniki	0 – 0	Ethnikos Neo Agioneri	Thessaloniki
		https://www.gazzetta.gr/football/article/880640/aris-petaxe-vathmoys-sto-vikelidis?page=2 (in Greek)		Stadium: Kleanthis Vikelidis Stadium

28 February 2016 23	APE Langadas	2 – 3	Aris Thessaloniki	Langadas
		https://www.gazzetta.gr/football/article/884216/niki-me-anatropi-o-aris-ston-lagkada (in Greek)	Andreas Tatos 46'; Antonis Kapnidis 68'; Leonidas Kyvelidis 87'	Stadium: Municipal Stadium of Langadas

6 March 2016 24	Aris Thessaloniki	2 – 0	Nestos Chrysoupoli	Thessaloniki
	Andreas Tatos 41' (pen.); Antonis Kapnidis 78'	https://www.sport24.gr/football/pio-konta-stin-anodo-o-aris-2-0-ton-nesto-chrysoypolis.8396700.html (in Greek)		Stadium: Kleanthis Vikelidis Stadium

12 March 2016 25	Apollon Pontus	0 – 2	Aris Thessaloniki	Thessaloniki
		https://www.gazzetta.gr/football/article/890900/aris-perase-kai-apo-tin-kalamaria-pics (in Greek)	Antonis Kapnidis 58'; Markos Dounis 64'	Stadium: Kalamaria Stadium

16 March 2016 26	Aris Thessaloniki	5 – 1	Kozani	Thessaloniki
	Sergio Koke 4'; Antonis Kapnidis 6', 34' (pen.), 85' (pen.); Gaël N'Lundulu 45'	https://www.sport24.gr/football/o-aris-isopedose-tin-kozani-5-1-sto-kl-vikelidis.8398120.html (in Greek)		Stadium: Kleanthis Vikelidis Stadium

20 March 2016 27	Aris Thessaloniki	3 – 0 w/o	Serres
		https://www.gazzetta.gr/football/article/894845/ta-apotelesmata-tis-g-ethnikis (in Greek)

27 March 2016 28	Ethnikos Alexandroupoli	0 – 1	Aris Thessaloniki	Alexandroupoli
		https://www.gazzetta.gr/football/article/898301/ethnikos-alexandroypolis-aris-0-1 (in Greek)	Mauro Poy 60'	Stadium: Fotis Kosmas Stadium

3 April 2016 29	Aris Thessaloniki	3 – 2	Eordaikos	Thessaloniki
	Paschalis Melissas 14'; Andreas Tatos 21'; Antonis Kapnidis 44' (pen.)	https://www.sport24.gr/football/sti-football-league-o-aris-3-1-ton-eordaiko.8400456.html (in Greek)		Stadium: Kleanthis Vikelidis Stadium

10 April 2016 30	Kampaniakos	0 – 3	Aris Thessaloniki	Chalastra
		https://www.sport24.gr/football/perase-ki-apo-ti-chalastra-o-aris-3-0-ton-kampaniako.8401352.html (in Greek)	Gaël N'Lundulu 34'; Antonis Kapnidis 42'; Markos Dounis 78'	Stadium: Kampaniakos Stadium

17 April 2016 31	Aris Thessaloniki	2 – 0	Vyzantio Kokkinochoma	Thessaloniki
	Leonidas Kyvelidis 21', 90+2'	https://www.sport24.gr/football/enati-seri-niki-o-aris-2-0-to-vyzantio-kokkinochomatos.8402302.html (in Greek)		Stadium: Kleanthis Vikelidis Stadium

24 April 2016 32	Thyella Filotas	0 – 0	Aris Thessaloniki	Florina
		https://www.sport24.gr/football/aggareia-gia-ton-ari-0-0-me-tin-thyella-filota.8403187.html (in Greek)		Stadium: Florina Municipal Stadium

8 May 2016 33	Aris Thessaloniki	2 – 1	Doxa Drama	Thessaloniki
	Mauro Poy 55'; Leonidas Kyvelidis 90+4'	https://www.sport24.gr/football/lytrotis-o-kyvelidis-sto-vikelidis-2-1-o-aris-ti-doxa.8404790.html (in Greek)		Stadium: Kleanthis Vikelidis Stadium

15 May 2016 34	Evros Soufli	0 – 6	Aris Thessaloniki	Soufli
		https://www.sport24.gr/football/antio-gia-ari-sti-g-ethniki-me-exara-sto-soyfli.8405814.html (in Greek)		Stadium: Dimitris Bakirtzis Municipal Stadium

=== Gamma Ethniki Cup ===
The 2015-16 season the Gamma Ethniki Cup did not hold

=== EPSM Cup ===
Aris Thessaloniki qualified from the Phase D without game. In Phase E the club played with Niki Mesimeri and used the U17 players and manager.

20 March 2016 Phase E	Niki Mesimeri	2 – 1	Aris Thessaloniki	Mesimeri
		https://www.metrosport.gr/ligise-sto-87-o-aris-66256 (in Greek)	Spyros Karvounis 75' (pen.)

== Squad statistics ==
=== Appearances ===
As of match played 15 May 2016

Position	Nat.	Player	Gamma Ethniki		EPSM Cup		Total	
Position	Nat.	Player	Apps	Starts	Apps	Starts	Apps	Starts
GK	(Greece)	Giannis Siderakis	18	18	0	0	18	18
GK	(Spain)	Xavi Ginard	13	13	0	0	13	13
DF	(Greece)	Nikos Tsoumanis	22	22	0	0	22	22
DF	(Greece)	Paschalis Melissas	22	20	0	0	22	20
DF	(Greece)	Christos Intzidis	21	21	0	0	21	21
DF	(Greece)	Nikolaos Georgiadis	19	19	0	0	19	19
DF	(Greece)	Dimitris Samaras	17	15	0	0	17	15
DF	(Spain)	Raúl Bravo	10	10	0	0	10	10
DF	(Greece)	Kyriakos Mazoulouxis	2	2	0	0	2	2
DF	(Greece)	Konstantinos Samaropoulos	1	0	0	0	1	0
MF	(Greece)	Andreas Tatos	28	26	0	0	28	26
MF	(Greece)	Vasilios Rovas	24	23	0	0	24	23
MF	(Greece)	Konstantinos Kaznaferis	24	22	0	0	24	22
MF	(Greece)	Alexandros Kalogeris	22	14	0	0	22	14
MF	(Greece)	Charalampos Pavlidis	6	4	0	0	6	4
FW	(Greece)	Antonis Kapnidis	29	27	0	0	29	27
FW	(Greece)	Markos Dounis	28	21	0	0	28	21
FW	(France) / (Republic of the Congo)	Gaël N'Lundulu	28	14	0	0	28	14
FW	(Argentina) / (Italy)	Mauro Poy	27	21	0	0	27	21
FW	(Greece)	Leonidas Kyvelidis	24	7	0	0	24	7
FW	(Spain)	Sergio Koke	18	13	0	0	18	13
FW	(Greece)	Paschalis Voutsias	12	5	0	0	12	5
FW	(Greece) / (Australia)	Vasilis Konstantinidis	9	3	0	0	9	3
FW	(Greece)	Stefanos Dogos	5	1	0	0	5	1
FW	(Greece)	Dimitrios Andreakos	1	0	0	0	1	0
FW	(Greece)	Ilias Boulgouridis	1	0	0	0	1	0
11 players from U17 team			0	0	1	1	1	1
Total			31		1		32	

=== Goals ===
As of match played 15 May 2016

Ranking	Position	Nat.	Player	Gamma Ethniki	EPSM Cup	Total
1	FW	(Greece)	Antonis Kapnidis	21	0	21
2	FW	(Greece)	Markos Dounis	12	0	12
3	MF	(Greece)	Andreas Tatos	10	0	10
4	FW	(Greece)	Leonidas Kyvelidis	9	0	9
5	FW	(France) / (Republic of the Congo)	Gaël N'Lundulu	4	0	4
5	FW	(Argentina) / (Italy)	Mauro Poy	4	0	4
7	FW	(Spain)	Sergio Koke	3	0	3
7	DF	(Greece)	Christos Intzidis	3	0	3
9	FW	(Greece) / (Australia)	Vasilis Konstantinidis	2	0	2
10	MF	(Greece)	Vasilios Rovas	1	0	1
10	DF	(Greece)	Paschalis Melissas	1	0	1
10	MF	(Greece)	Alexandros Kalogeris	1	0	1
10	MF	(Greece)	Charalampos Pavlidis	1	0	1
10	FW	(Greece)	Spyros Karvounis^{1}	0	1	1
Own Goals				1	0	1
Awarded by League				3	0	3
Total				76	1	77

- ^{1} Player from U17 team

=== Clean sheets ===
As of match played 15 May 2016

Nat.	Player	Gamma Ethniki	EPSM Cup	Total
(Greece)	Giannis Siderakis	11	0	11
(Spain)	Xavi Ginard	6	0	6
Total		17	0	17
