= 2016–17 Aris Thessaloniki F.C. season =

Aris Thessaloniki
- President: Theodoros A. Karipidis
- Manager: Nikos Anastopoulos (until 24 February 2017); Paschalis Melissas (from 24 February 2017 until 28 February 2017); Nikos Kostenoglou (from 28 February 2017)
- Stadium: Kleanthis Vikelidis Stadium
- Football League: 3rd
- Greek Cup: Round of 16
- Top goalscorer: League: Andreas Tatos (11); All: Andreas Tatos (9); Antonis Kapnidis (9)
Home colours	Away colours

The 2016-17 season was Aris Thessaloniki FC's 3rd season in Football League. They were also competing in the Greek Cup.

== First team ==
#	Name	Nationality	Position(s)	Date of birth (age)	Signed from
Goalkeepers
1	Alexandros Anagnostopoulos	(Greece)	GK	August 18, 1994 (aged 22)	(Greece) Panathinaikos
13	Sokratis Dioudis (vice-captain)	(Greece)	GK	February 3, 1993 (aged 24)	(Belgium) Club Brugge KV
25	Giannis Mantzaris	(Greece)	GK	April 15, 1996 (aged 21)	Club's Academy
Defenders
2	Darcy Dolce Neto	(Brazil)	RB / RW	7 February 1981 (aged 36)	(Greece) Veria
3	Hugo Sousa	(Portugal)	CB / RB	4 June 1992 (aged 24)	Free Agent
5	Stathis Tavlaridis	(Greece)	CB / RB	25 January 1980 (aged 37)	(Greece) Panathinaikos
6	Raúl Bravo	(Spain)	CB / LB	14 April 1981 (aged 36)	(Greece) Veria
15	Nikolaos Karabelas	(Greece)	LB / LM	20 December 1984 (aged 32)	(Spain) Real Valladolid
18	Nikos Tsoumanis	(Greece)	LB / LM	8 June 1990 (aged 26)	(Greece) Veria
21	Madjid Bougherra	(Algeria) / (France)	CB / RB	7 October 1982 (aged 34)	Free Agent
24	Lazaros Haritonidis	(Greece)	CB	18 December 1989 (aged 27)	(Greece) Doxa Drama
27	Manolis Tzanakakis	(Greece)	RB / RM / LB	30 April 1992 (aged 25)	(Greece) Olympiacos
28	Christos Bourbos	(Greece)	RB / RM	1 June 1983 (aged 33)	Free Agent
39	Christos Intzidis	(Greece)	CB / DM / LB	9 January 1993 (aged 24)	(Greece) Panachaiki
Midfielders
4	Vasilios Rovas	(Greece)	DM / CB	6 January 1984 (aged 33)	(Greece) AEK Athens
8	Charalampos Pavlidis	(Greece)	AM / CM / LM	6 May 1991 (aged 26)	(Greece) Veria
10	Andreas Tatos (captain)	(Greece)	AM / CM	11 May 1989 (aged 28)	(Greece) Veria
20	Spyros Karvounis	(Greece)	AM	21 July 1999 (aged 17)	Club's Academy
22	Andreu Guerao	(Spain)	CM / DM	17 June 1983 (aged 33)	(Australia) Western Sydney Wanderers
26	Pitu Garcia	(Argentina)	CM / AM	27 January 1984 (aged 33)	(South Korea) Seongnam FC
77	Gaius Makouta	(Republic of the Congo) / (France)	DM / CM	25 July 1997 (aged 19)	(Republic of Ireland) Longford Town
88	Dimitris Anakoglou	(Greece)	AM / CM	6 September 1991 (aged 25)	(Greece) AEK Athens
Forwards
7	Markos Dounis	(Greece)	RW / LW / AM	9 May 1992 (aged 25)	(Greece) AEK Athens
9	Antonis Kapnidis	(Greece)	ST	15 August 1992 (aged 24)	(Greece) Kavala
11	Kenan Bargan	(Greece)	LW / SS	25 October 1988 (aged 28)	(Greece) Panionios
14	Rafik Djebbour	(Algeria) / (France)	ST / LW / RW	8 March 1984 (aged 33)	(Greece) AEK Athens
16	Luka Milunović	(Serbia)	AM / LW / RW	21 December 1992 (aged 24)	(Greece) Platanias
17	Stefanos Dogos	(Greece)	LW / RW / LB	5 May 1994 (aged 23)	(Greece) Veria
19	Brana Ilić	(Serbia)	ST / LW / RW	16 February 1985 (aged 32)	(Greece) PAS Giannina
36	Paschalis Voutsias	(Greece)	RW / RB	23 March 1990 (aged 27)	Free Agent

== Competitions ==
=== Overall ===
Competition	Started round	Current position / round	Final position / round	First match	Last match
Football League	Matchday 1	—	3rd	1 November 2016	11 June 2017
Greek Cup	Group stage	—	Round of 16	25 October 2016	2 February 2017

Updated to match played 11 June 2017
Source: Competitions

=== Overview ===
Competition	Record							
Competition	G	W	D	L	GF	GA	GD	Win %
Football League	34	23	8	3	58	17	+41	67.65
Greek Cup	5	1	3	1	7	6	+1	20.00
Total	39	24	11	4	65	23	+42	61.54

Updated to match played 11 June 2017
Source: Competitions

==== Managers' Overview ====
Manager	Nat.	From	Until	Record							
Manager	Nat.	From	Until	G	W	D	L	GF	GA	GD	Win %
Nikos Anastopoulos	(Greece)	Start of Season	24 February 2017	22	11	8	3	38	20	+18	50.00 (Note: It is included game against Panthrakikos which awarded with 3-0 w/o)
Paschalis Melissas	(Greece)	24 February 2017	28 February 2017	1	1	0	0	3	0	+3	100.00
Nikos Kostenoglou	(Greece)	28 February 2017	End of Season	16	12	3	1	24	3	+21	75.00 (Note: It is included game against Panthrakikos which awarded with 0-3 w/o)

Updated to match played 11 June 2017
Source: Competitions

=== Football League ===
==== League table ====
Pos	Team	Pld	W	D	L	GF	GA	GD	Pts	Promotion or relegation
1	Apollon Smyrnis (C, P)	34	25	8	1	61	14	+47	83	Promotion to Super League
2	Lamia (P)	34	25	5	4	55	11	+44	80	Promotion to Super League
3	Aris	34	23	8	3	58	17	+41	77	
4	OFI	34	22	6	6	68	20	+48	72	
5	Trikala	34	22	5	7	65	19	+46	71	

Source: Football League and footballleaguenews.gr
Rules for classification: 1) Points; 2) Head-to-head points; 3) Head-to-head goal difference; 4) Goals scored; 5) Goals against; 6) Play-offs (neutral ground, only used if needed to decide teams for promotion or relegation).
(C) Champions; (P) Promoted

==== Results summary ====
Overall								Home						Away					
Pld	W	D	L	GF	GA	GD	Pts	W	D	L	GF	GA	GD	W	D	L	GF	GA	GD
34	23	8	3	58	17	+41	77	15	2	0	39	6	+33	8	6	3	19	11	+8

Last updated: 11 June 2017.
Source: Soccerway

==== Matches ====
1 November 2016 1	Anagennisi Karditsa	1 – 1	Aris Thessaloniki	Karditsa
15:00	Xenofon Fetsis 49'	Report	Raúl Bravo 71'	Stadium: Municipal Stadium of Karditsa; Referee: Alexandros Katsikogiannis

6 November 2016 2	Aris Thessaloniki	1 – 1	Aiginiakos	Thessaloniki
15:00	Andreas Tatos 90+7' (pen.)	Report	Bogdan Rangelov 87'	Stadium: Kleanthis Vikelidis Stadium; Referee: Vasilis Fotias

26 November 2016 3	AO Chania – Kissamikos	0 – 1	Aris Thessaloniki	Chania
16:00		Report	Antonis Kapnidis 51'	Stadium: Perivolia Municipal Stadium; Referee: Aristomenis Koutsiaftis

5 December 2016 4	Aris Thessaloniki	5 – 0	AEL Kalloni	Thessaloniki
15:00	Lazaros Tzelidis 12' (o.g.); Andreas Tatos 74', 88'; Antonis Kapnidis 76'; Kenan Bargan 80'	Report		Stadium: Kleanthis Vikelidis Stadium; Referee: Apostolos Simaiakis

10 December 2016 5	Panelefsiniakos	1 – 3	Aris Thessaloniki	Elefsina
15:00	Nikos Aggeloudis 14'	Report	Darcy Dolce Neto 33'; Kenan Bargan 40'; Luka Milunović 70'	Stadium: Municipal Stadium of Eleusina; Referee: Ioannis Neofitiadis

18 December 2016 6	Aris Thessaloniki	3 – 2	Trikala	Thessaloniki
17:00	Kenan Bargan 52'; Brana Ilić 62', 82'	Report	Nikos Kouskounas 49'; Nikos Giannitsanis 71'	Stadium: Kleanthis Vikelidis Stadium; Referee: Giorgos Vreskas

22 December 2016 7	Aris Thessaloniki	2 – 1	AO Chania	Thessaloniki
17:00	Andreas Tatos 40'; Antonis Kapnidis 90+1'	Report	Alexandros Zeris 19'	Stadium: Kleanthis Vikelidis Stadium; Referee: Ioannis Gougoudis

3 January 2017 8	Kallithea	2 – 0	Aris Thessaloniki	Athens
15:00	Andreas Tsipras 66', 77'	Report		Stadium: Grigoris Lambrakis Stadium; Referee: Giorgos Foukakis

8 January 2017 9	Aris Thessaloniki	2 – 1	Panegialios	Thessaloniki
17:00	Nikos Karabelas 30'; Luka Milunović 67'	Report	Apostolos Stikas 42'	Stadium: Kleanthis Vikelidis Stadium; Referee: Andreas Karaliolios

18 January 2017 11	Aris Thessaloniki	4 – 0	Panserraikos	Thessaloniki
17:00	Markos Dounis 21', 29'; Christos Intzidis 24'; Luka Milunović 89'	Report		Stadium: Kleanthis Vikelidis Stadium; Referee: Evangelos Kiotzenis

21 January 2017 12	Acharnaikos	1 – 2	Aris Thessaloniki	Athens
14:00	Alexandros Tsemperidis 45+2'	Report	Kenan Bargan 10'; Brana Ilić 32'	Stadium: Acharnes Stadium; Referee: Manolis Skoulas

28 January 2017 13	Aris Thessaloniki	1 – 0	OFI	Thessaloniki
15:00	Luka Milunović 11'	Report		Stadium: Kleanthis Vikelidis Stadium; Referee: Alexandros Aretopoulos

5 February 2017 14	Lamia	1 – 0	Aris Thessaloniki	Lamia
15:00	Andreas Vasilogiannis 66'	Report		Stadium: Lamia Municipal Stadium; Referee: Charalambos Kalogeropoulos

12 February 2017 15	Apollon Smyrnis	2 – 2	Aris Thessaloniki	Athens
15:00	Christos Albanis 53'; Georgios Dasios 90+1'	Report	Brana Ilić 14'; Markos Dounis 32'	Stadium: Georgios Kamaras Stadium; Referee: Stavros Mantalos

15 February 2017 10 (Note: Τhe Game was scheduled on 14 January 2017 and was postponed due to bad weather)	Agrotikos Asteras	1 – 1	Aris Thessaloniki	Thessaloniki
15:00	Jonathan Phillippe 86'	Report	Brana Ilić 52'	Stadium: Agrotikos Asteras Stadium; Referee: Aristomenis Koutsiaftis

19 February 2017 16	Aris Thessaloniki	3 – 0 w/o	Panthrakikos
		Report

22 February 2017 17	Sparti	0 – 0	Aris Thessaloniki	Sparta
15:00		Report		Stadium: Sparta Municipal Stadium; Referee: Aristotelis Diamantopoulos

26 February 2017 18	Aris Thessaloniki	3 – 0	Anagennisi Karditsa	Thessaloniki
15:00	Markos Dounis 1'; Charalampos Pavlidis 33', 55'	Report		Stadium: Kleanthis Vikelidis Stadium; Referee: Konstantinos Kotsanis

5 March 2017 19	Aiginiakos	0 – 1	Aris Thessaloniki	Aiginio
15:00		Report	Andreas Tatos 3'	Stadium: Municipal Stadium of Aiginio; Referee: Thanasis Tzilos

12 March 2017 20	Aris Thessaloniki	1 – 0	AO Chania – Kissamikos	Thessaloniki
15:00	Pitu Garcia 31'	Report		Stadium: Kleanthis Vikelidis Stadium; Referee: Fotios Fotiadis

19 March 2017 21	AEL Kalloni	0 – 1	Aris Thessaloniki	Mytilene
15:00		Report	Brana Ilić 90+5'	Stadium: Mytilene Municipal Stadium; Referee: Spiros Michelis

22 March 2017 22	Aris Thessaloniki	4 – 0	Panelefsiniakos	Thessaloniki
15:00	Andreas Tatos 51'; Brana Ilić 56'; Antonis Kapnidis 76' (pen.); Stathis Tavlaridis 83'	Report		Stadium: Kleanthis Vikelidis Stadium; Referee: Dimitris Dragatis

26 March 2017 23	Trikala	1 – 0	Aris Thessaloniki	Trikala
15:00	Javier Balboa 33'	Report		Stadium: Trikala Municipal Stadium; Referee: Manolis Skoulas

2 April 2017 24	AO Chania	0 – 2	Aris Thessaloniki	Chania
15:00		Report	Antonis Kapnidis 63'; Andreas Tatos 71' (pen.)	Stadium: Perivolia Municipal Stadium; Referee: Aristotelis Diamantopoulos

9 April 2017 25	Aris Thessaloniki	3 – 0	Kallithea	Thessaloniki
16:00	Markos Dounis 8'; Manolis Tzanakakis 53'; Hugo Sousa 77'	Report		Stadium: Kleanthis Vikelidis Stadium; Referee: Apostolos Tzoumalakis

13 April 2017 26	Panegialios	0 – 1	Aris Thessaloniki	Aigio
15:00		Report	Antonis Kapnidis 53'	Stadium: Aigio National Stadium; Referee: Georgios Markantonatos

23 April 2017 27	Aris Thessaloniki	2 – 0	Agrotikos Asteras	Thessaloniki
15:00	Andreas Tatos 24'; Brana Ilić 30'	Report		Stadium: Kleanthis Vikelidis Stadium; Referee: Stefanos Koubarakis

30 April 2017 28	Panserraikos	0 – 0	Aris Thessaloniki	Serres
17:00		Report		Stadium: Serres Municipal Stadium; Referee: Fotios Fotiadis

7 May 2017 29	Aris Thessaloniki	2 – 0	Acharnaikos	Thessaloniki
17:00	Markos Dounis 49'; Andreas Tatos 80' (pen.)	Report		Stadium: Kleanthis Vikelidis Stadium; Referee: Labros Papargiriou

13 May 2017 30	OFI	1 – 1	Aris Thessaloniki	Heraklion
17:00	Vladan Milosavljev 29'	Report	Antonis Kapnidis 73'	Stadium: Theodoros Vardinogiannis Stadium; Referee: Dimitrios Thanos

21 May 2017 31	Aris Thessaloniki	0 – 0	Lamia	Thessaloniki
17:00		Report		Stadium: Kleanthis Vikelidis Stadium; Referee: Giorgos Foukakis

28 May 2017 32	Aris Thessaloniki	1 – 0	Apollon Smyrnis	Thessaloniki
17:00	Antonis Kapnidis 72'	Report		Stadium: Kleanthis Vikelidis Stadium; Referee: Evangelos Gratsanis

4 June 2017 33	Panthrakikos	0 – 3 w/o	Aris Thessaloniki
		Report

11 June 2017 34	Aris Thessaloniki	2 – 1	Sparti	Thessaloniki
17:00	Antonis Kapnidis 50'; Darcy Dolce Neto 85'	Report	Ilias Anastasakos 36'	Stadium: Kleanthis Vikelidis Stadium; Referee: Engin Kigintzis

=== Greek Cup ===
Aris Thessaloniki entered the competition in the Group Stage, as a club from Football League.

==== Group stage ====
Pos	Team	Pld	W	D	L	GF	GA	GD	Pts	
1	Asteras Tripolis	3	2	1	0	8	4	+4	7	Qualification for the Round of 16
2	Aris Thessaloniki	3	1	2	0	6	3	+3	5	Qualification for the Round of 16
3	Aiginiakos	3	1	0	2	2	7	−5	3	
4	Veria	3	0	1	2	0	2	−2	1	

Updated to match(es) played on unknown. Source: Soccerway
Rules for classification: 1) Points; 2) Head-to-head points; 3) Goal difference; 4) Goals scored

===== Matches =====
25 October 2016 1	Aiginiakos	0 – 3	Aris Thessaloniki	Veria
15:00		Report	Antonis Kapnidis 19'; Luka Milunović 71', 82'	Stadium: Veria Stadium; Referee: Evangelos Gratsanis

29 November 2016 2	Aris Thessaloniki	3 – 3	Asteras Tripolis	Thessaloniki
17:15	Kenan Bargan 25'; Andreas Tatos 85' (pen.), 87'	Report	Pablo Mazza 14'; Nikolaos Ioannidis 29'; Kosmas Tsilianidis 72'	Stadium: Kleanthis Vikelidis Stadium; Referee: Dimitrios Karantonis

13 December 2016 3	Aris Thessaloniki	0 – 0	Veria	Thessaloniki
15:00		Report		Stadium: Kleanthis Vikelidis Stadium; Referee: Dionisis Zougras

==== Round of 16 ====
25 January 2017 First leg	Aris Thessaloniki	1 – 1	Olympiacos	Thessaloniki
19:00	Luka Milunović 13'	Report	Karim Ansarifard 81'	Stadium: Kleanthis Vikelidis Stadium; Referee: Triandafillos Tikas

2 February 2017 Second leg	Olympiacos	2 – 0 (3–1 agg.)	Aris Thessaloniki	Piraeus
19:30	Aly Cissokho 50'; Dimitris Nikolaou 86'	Report		Stadium: Karaiskakis Stadium; Referee: Spyros Selimos

== Squad statistics ==
=== Appearances ===
As of match played 11 June 2017

#	Position	Nat.	Player	Football League		Greek Cup		Total	
#	Position	Nat.	Player	Apps	Starts	Apps	Starts	Apps	Starts
1	GK	(Greece)	Alexandros Anagnostopoulos	1	1	2	2	3	3
2	DF	(Brazil)	Darcy Dolce Neto	15	4	3	2	18	6
3	DF	(Portugal)	Hugo Sousa	18	18	2	2	20	20
4	MF	(Greece)	Vasilios Rovas	22	17	4	4	26	21
5	DF	(Greece)	Stathis Tavlaridis	15	14	0	0	15	14
6	DF	(Spain)	Raúl Bravo	15	13	2	2	17	15
7	FW	(Greece)	Markos Dounis	23	17	4	4	27	21
8	MF	(Greece)	Charalampos Pavlidis	28	25	5	1	33	26
9	FW	(Greece)	Antonis Kapnidis	28	7	5	5	33	12
10	MF	(Greece)	Andreas Tatos	28	27	2	2	30	29
11	FW	(Greece)	Kenan Bargan	23	16	3	2	26	18
13	GK	(Greece)	Sokratis Dioudis	31	31	3	3	34	34
14	FW	(Algeria) / (France)	Rafik Djebbour	5	1	0	0	5	1
15	DF	(Greece)	Nikolaos Karabelas	27	23	2	2	29	25
16	FW	(Serbia)	Luka Milunović	25	17	4	2	29	19
17	FW	(Greece)	Stefanos Dogos	6	3	1	1	7	4
18	DF	(Greece)	Nikos Tsoumanis	5	4	4	4	9	8
19	FW	(Serbia)	Brana Ilić	31	29	0	0	31	29
20	FW	(Greece)	Spyros Karvounis	0	0	2	0	2	0
24	DF	(Greece)	Lazaros Haritonidis	7	6	1	1	8	7
25	GK	(Greece)	Giannis Mantzaris	0	0	0	0	0	0
26	MF	(Argentina)	Pitu Garcia	20	18	2	1	22	19
27	DF	(Greece)	Manolis Tzanakakis	22	18	5	4	27	22
28	DF	(Greece)	Christos Bourbos	18	17	1	1	19	18
39	DF	(Greece)	Christos Intzidis	15	13	4	3	19	16
77	MF	(Republic of the Congo) / (France)	Gaius Makouta	5	1	1	1	6	2
88	MF	(Greece)	Dimitris Anakoglou	13	10	4	3	17	13
Players who left the club during this season
	DF	(Algeria) / (France)	Madjid Bougherra	0	0	0	0	0	0
	MF	(Spain)	Andreu Guerao	2	2	3	2	5	4
	FW	(Greece)	Paschalis Voutsias	0	0	1	1	1	1
Total				32		5		37	

=== Goals ===
As of match played 11 June 2017

Ranking	Position	Nat.	Player	Football League	Greek Cup	Total
1	MF	(Greece)	Andreas Tatos	9	2	11
2	FW	(Greece)	Antonis Kapnidis	9	1	10
3	FW	(Serbia)	Brana Ilić	8	0	8
4	FW	(Serbia)	Luka Milunović	4	3	7
5	FW	(Greece)	Markos Dounis	6	0	6
6	FW	(Greece)	Kenan Bargan	4	1	5
7	MF	(Greece)	Charalampos Pavlidis	2	0	2
7	DF	(Brazil)	Darcy Dolce Neto	2	0	2
9	DF	(Greece)	Nikolaos Karabelas	1	0	1
9	DF	(Greece)	Manolis Tzanakakis	1	0	1
9	MF	(Argentina)	Pitu Garcia	1	0	1
9	DF	(Portugal)	Hugo Sousa	1	0	1
9	DF	(Greece)	Christos Intzidis	1	0	1
9	DF	(Spain)	Raúl Bravo	1	0	1
9	DF	(Greece)	Stathis Tavlaridis	1	0	1
Own Goals				1	0	1
Awarded by League				6	0	6
Total				58	7	65

=== Clean sheets ===
As of match played 11 June 2017

#	Nat.	Player	Football League	Greek Cup	Total
13	(Greece)	Sokratis Dioudis	18	1	19
1	(Greece)	Alexandros Anagnostopoulos	0	1	1
Total			18	2	20
