= Antonis Stergiakis =

Greek footballer

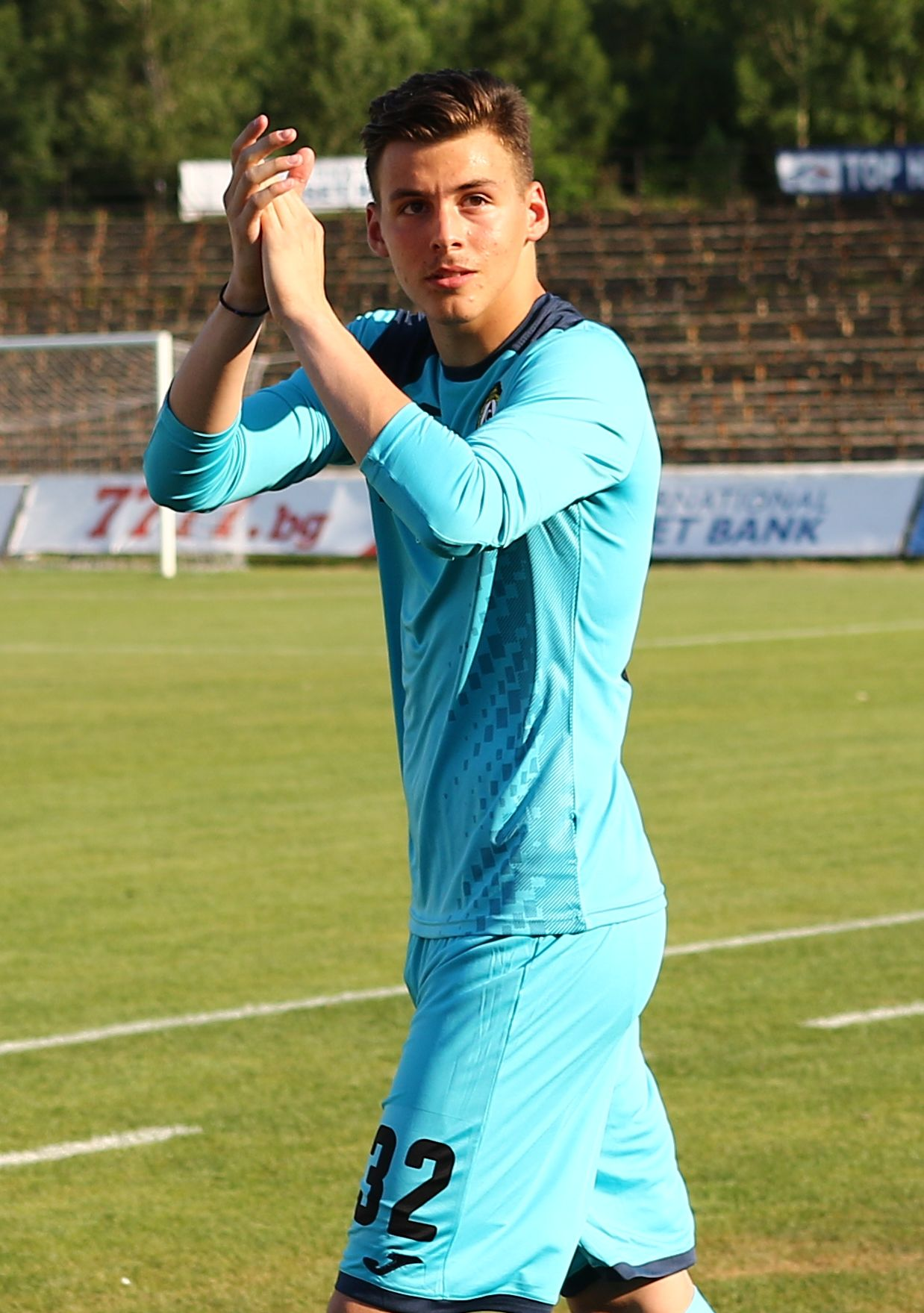

Personal information
- Full name: Antonios Stergiakis
- Date of birth: 16 March 1999 (age 27)
- Place of birth: Thessaloniki, Greece
- Height: 1.95 m (6 ft 5 in)
- Position: Goalkeeper

Youth career
- 2005–2015: Aris

Senior career*
Years	Team	Apps	(Gls)
2015	Thyella Filota	7	(0)
2015–2020	Slavia Sofia	78	(0)
2020–2022	Blackburn Rovers	0	(0)
2022–2025	Panetolikos	8	(0)
2025–2026	Niki Volos	0	(0)
2026–	PAOK B	3	(0)

International career^{‡}
2014–2016	Greece U17	3	(0)
2017–2018	Greece U19	4	(0)
2019–2020	Greece U21	5	(0)
- * Club domestic league appearances and goals as of 16 June 2026 ‡ National team caps and goals as of 3 September 2020

Antonis Stergiakis (Greek: Αντώνης Στεργιάκης; born 16 March 1999) is a Greek professional footballer who plays as a goalkeeper for Super League 2 club PAOK B.

== Club career ==
=== Slavia Sofia ===
After spending time at Aris' academies, he played in the Greek third tier with Thyella Filota in 2015. Greek giants Olympiacos held talks with Stergiakis but the goalkeeper wanted first-team football and chose to go on trial with Slavia Sofia. Stergiakis joined Bulgarian Slavia Sofia in August 2015. He became the first choice goalkeeper for the U19 team and was an unused substitute in five matches during the 2015–16 season. In the beginning of August 2016 he was on trial in the Italian Roma. He travelled to Trigoria for a trial but turned down the offer to move to the primavera squad.

On 21 August 2016, Stergiakis made his debut for Slavia coming as a substitute in the 74th minute in a 4–0 away loss against Levski Sofia.

On 10 April 2017, Stergiakis was officially nominated for the 2017 Golden Boy Award, becoming only the second Greek footballer to receive such a 2017 nomination alongside Lazaros Lamprou. After impressing the goalkeeping coach, Stergiakis signed a five-year contract.

On 29 June 2019, Stergiakis, was the only Greek player included in Tuttosport's list of the world's top-100 footballers at the U21 level.

=== Blackburn Rovers ===
On 6 October 2020, Stergiakis joined Championship side Blackburn Rovers on a three-year deal, with the club having the option to extend the contract by a further 12 months.

=== Panetolikos ===
On 26 May 2022, Stergiakis joined Super League club Panetolikos on a three-year deal.

=== Niki Volos ===
On 28 July 2025, he joined Super League Greece 2 club Niki Volos.

== International career ==
In November 2018, Stergiakis was called up by Greece U21 for the first time and appeared as an unused substitute in the 2019 European Under-21 Championship qualification play-offs against Austria. He made his under-21 debut on 26 March 2019, in a friendly at home against Montenegro, which ended 1–1. His final appearance for the U21 national team came in the form of a 5–0 defeat in the side's 2021 European Under-21 Championship qualifiers game against Croatia on 3 September 2020.

== Career statistics ==
As of 3 October 2020

Appearances and goals by club, season and competition
Club	Season	League			Cup		Europe		Other		Total	
Club	Season	Division	Apps	Goals	Apps	Goals	Apps	Goals	Apps	Goals	Apps	Goals
Thyella Filota	2014–15	Gamma Ethniki	7	0	0	0	—		—		7	0
Slavia Sofia	2015–16	A Group	0	0	0	0	—		—		0	0
Slavia Sofia	2016–17	First League	8	0	1	0	0	0	—		9	0
Slavia Sofia	2017–18	First League	22	0	4	0	—		—		26	0
Slavia Sofia	2018–19	First League	17	0	0	0	2	0	1	0	20	0
Slavia Sofia	2019–20	First League	14	0	1	0	0	0	0	0	15	0
Slavia Sofia	2020–21	First League	7	0	0	0	1	0	0	0	8	0
Slavia Sofia	Total		68	0	6	0	3	0	1	0	78	0
Blackburn Rovers	2020–21	Championship	0	0	0	0	0	0	0	0	0	0
Blackburn Rovers	2021–22	Championship	0	0	0	0	0	0	0	0	0	0
Career total			75	0	6	0	3	0	1	0	85	0

== Honours ==
Slavia Sofia

- Bulgarian Cup: 2017–18
