= 2014–15 Gamma Ethniki =

Gamma Ethniki
- Season: 2014–15

The 2014–15 Gamma Ethniki was the 32nd season since the official establishment of the third tier of Greek football in 1983. It started on 14 September 2014 and ended on 17 May 2015.

61 teams were separated into four groups, according to geographical criteria.

Thermaikos and A.O. Trikala 1963 withdrew from the league before the group draw.

== Group 1 ==
=== Teams ===
Location of teams in Group 1 of 2014–15 Football League 2

Team	Location	Last season
Panserraikos	Serres	Group 1, 2nd
Aris Akropotamos	Akropotamos	Group 1, 3rd
Orfeas Elefteroupoli	Eleftheroupoli	Group 1, 8th
Vyzantio Kokkinochoma	Kokkinochoma	Group 1, 5th
Kavala	Kavala	FL North, 13th
Ethnikos Neo Agioneri	Neo Agioneri	Group 1, 6th
Evros Soufli	Soufli	Group 1, 7th
Ethnikos Alexandroupoli	Alexandroupoli	EPS Evros champion, promotion play-off Group 1 winner
Anagennisi Giannitsa	Giannitsa	FL North, 14th
Kampaniakos	Chalastra	Group 2, 3rd
Aris	Thessaloniki	SL, 18th (they were actually relegated to Football League, but they voluntarily relegated one more category lower, to Third Division)
Iraklis Ambelokipi	Ampelokipi	Group 1, 4th
Kastoria	Kastoria	Group 2, 8th
Apollon Arnaia	Arnaia	EPS Chalkidiki champion, promotion play-off Group 3 winner
Doxa Drama	Drama	FL North, 10th (relegated to Third Division voluntarily)
Thyella Filotas	Filotas	EPS Florina champion, promotion play-off Group 4 winner

=== Standings ===
Pos	Team	Pld	W	D	L	GF	GA	GD	Pts	Promotion or relegation
1	Panserraikos (C, P)	30	23	5	2	52	15	+37	74	Promotion to Football League
2	Aris	30	22	5	3	51	12	+39	71	
3	Kavala	30	20	7	3	54	16	+38	67	
4	Doxa Dramas	30	15	7	8	43	26	+17	52	
5	Kampaniakos	30	13	8	9	53	34	+19	47	
6	Ethnikos Neo Agioneri	30	11	9	10	40	34	+6	42	
7	Iraklis Ambelokipi	30	10	11	9	32	30	+2	41	
8	Thyella Filotas	30	10	10	10	32	31	+1	40	
9	Vyzantio Kokkinochoma	30	12	4	14	44	49	−5	40	
10	Ethnikos Alexandroupoli	30	9	11	10	28	28	0	38	
11	Evros Soufli	30	10	7	13	32	34	−2	37	
12	Aris Akropotamos (R)	30	8	10	12	32	45	−13	34	Relegation to FCA championships
13	Apollon Arnaia (R)	30	7	6	17	26	45	−19	27	Relegation to FCA championships
14	Orfeas Elefteroupoli (R)	30	5	7	18	26	43	−17	22	Relegation to FCA championships
15	Anagennisi Giannitsa (R)	30	5	5	20	19	62	−43	20	Relegation to FCA championships
16	Kastoria (R)	30	2	4	24	15	75	−60	4 (Note: Kastoria withdrew from the league on 14 April 2015. They were deducted six points for this season and also six points for the 2015–16 season by Hellenic Football Federation.)	Relegation to FCA championships

Source: Hellenic Football Federation (in Greek)
Rules for classification: 1st points; 2nd head-to-head points; 3rd head-to-head goal difference
(C) Champions; (P) Promoted; (R) Relegated

== Group 2 ==
=== Teams ===
Location of teams in Group 2 of 2014–15 Football League 2

Team	Location	Last season
Makrochori	Makrochori	Group 3, 4th
Lefkadia	Lefkadia	Group 3, 5th
Oikonomos	Tsaritsani	Group 2, 2nd
Dotieas Agia	Agia	Group 3, 6th
Ethnikos Filippiada	Filippiada	Group 2, 5th
Kozani	Kozani	Group 2, 4th
Thesprotos	Igoumenitsa	Group 2, 7th
A.E. Karaiskakis	Arta	Group 4, 4th
Anagennisi Arta	Arta	EPS Arta champion, promotion play-off Group 8 winner
Pyrsos Grevena	Grevena	Group 2, 6th
Achilleas Neokaisareia	Neokaisareia	Group 3, 2nd
Vataniakos	Katerini	FL North, 12th
Rigas Feraios	Velestino	Group 3, 8th
Pyrasos	Nea Anchialos	EPS Thessaly champion, promotion play-off Group 6 winner
Trikala	Trikala	EPS Trikala champion, promotion play-off Group 5 winner *
Opountios	Martino	EPS Phthiotis champion, promotion play-off Group 7 winner

- note: A.O. Flamouli F.C. was actually EPS Trikala champion and winner of the 5th Group of the promotion play-offs but merged with Trikala on 12 July 2014

=== Standings ===
Pos	Team	Pld	W	D	L	GF	GA	GD	Pts	Promotion or relegation
1	Trikala (C, P)	30	21	8	1	55	15	+40	71	Promotion to Football League
2	A.E. Karaiskakis	30	21	7	2	60	14	+46	70	
3	Achilleas Neokaisareia	30	17	8	5	47	18	+29	59	
4	Opountios	30	15	8	7	52	26	+26	53	
5	Thesprotos	30	16	5	9	39	28	+11	53	
6	Pyrasos	30	13	10	7	40	27	+13	49	
7	Rigas Feraios	30	13	10	7	42	19	+23	49	
8	Oikonomos	30	12	10	8	42	31	+11	46	
9	Ethnikos Filippiada	30	13	7	10	40	31	+9	46	
10	Kozani	30	13	6	11	48	40	+8	45	
11	Dotieas Agia	30	11	9	10	37	28	+9	42	
12	Anagennisi Arta (R)	30	11	9	10	42	30	+12	42	Relegation to FCA championships
13	Vataniakos (R)	30	5	4	21	25	59	−34	19	Relegation to FCA championships
14	Makrochori (R)	30	3	4	23	22	73	−51	13	Relegation to FCA championships
15	Pyrsos Grevena (R)	29	2	1	26	10	77	−67	1 (Note: Pyrsos Grevena withdrew from the league on 17 January 2015. They were deducted six points for this season and also six points for the 2015–16 season by Hellenic Football Federation.)	Relegation to FCA championships
16	Lefkadia (R)	29	0	0	29	7	92	−85	−6 (Note: On 11 January 2015 Lefkadia expelled from the league for the rest of the season. They were deducted six points for this season and also six points for the 2015–16 season by Hellenic Football Federation.)	Relegation to FCA championships

Source: Hellenic Football Federation (in Greek)
Rules for classification: 1st points; 2nd head-to-head points; 3rd head-to-head goal difference
(C) Champions; (P) Promoted; (R) Relegated

== Group 3 ==
=== Teams ===
Location of teams in Group 3 of 2014–15 Football League 2

Team	Location	Last season
Zakynthiakos	Zakynthos	EPS Zakynthos champion, promotion play-off Group 12 winner
Kalamata	Kalamata	Group 4, 3rd
Panargiakos	Argos	Group 4, 2nd
Ermis Kiveri	Kiveri	EPS Argolis champion, promotion play-off Group 13 winner
PAO Varda	Varda	Group 4, 8th
Doxa Nea Manolada	Nea Manolada	Group 4, 5th
Panarkadikos	Tripoli	Group 4, 6th
Achaiki	Kato Achaia	Group 4, 7th
Panelefsiniakos	Eleusina	Group 5, 2nd
Vyzas	Megara	FL South, 14th
Mandraikos	Mandra	Group 6, 8th
Asteras Magoula	Magoula	FL South, 12th
A.O.Kymi	Kymi	Group 3, 3rd
A.O.Loutraki	Loutraki	EPS Corinthia champion, promotion play-off Group 11 winner
Aiolikos	Mytilene	EPS Lesvos champion, promotion play-off Group 10 winner

=== Standings ===
Pos	Team	Pld	W	D	L	GF	GA	GD	Pts	Promotion or relegation
1	Panelefsiniakos (C, P)	28	22	2	4	59	12	+47	68	Promotion to Football League
2	Panargiakos	28	19	6	3	54	15	+39	63	
3	Aiolikos	28	15	4	9	43	26	+17	49	
4	Zakynthiakos	28	13	9	6	47	34	+13	48	
5	Doxa Nea Manolada	28	13	9	6	37	24	+13	48	
6	Panarkadikos	28	13	8	7	47	31	+16	47	
7	Kalamata	28	13	7	8	36	24	+12	46	
8	A.O.Loutraki	28	12	8	8	31	25	+6	44	
9	Vyzas	28	12	7	9	38	24	+14	43	
10	PAO Varda	28	10	9	9	43	37	+6	39	
11	Achaiki (R)	28	7	10	11	36	48	−12	28 (Note: Achaiki were deducted three points due to extreme fan behavior and two for the 2015–16 season from Hellenic Football Federation)	Relegation to FCA championships
12	Ermis Kiveri (R)	28	8	6	14	28	37	−9	26 (Note: Ermis Kiveri withdrew from the league on 5 May 2015. They were deducted four points for this season and also four points for the 2015–16 season by Hellenic Football Federation.)	Relegation to FCA championships
13	Asteras Magoula (R)	28	3	6	19	22	62	−40	13 (Note: Asteras Magoula expelled from the league on 22 April 2015. They were deducted two points for this season and also two points for the 2015–16 season from Hellenic Football Federation.)	Relegation to FCA championships
14	Mandraikos (R)	28	3	2	23	12	57	−45	5 (Note: Mandraikos withdrew from the league on 21 March 2015. They were deducted six points for this season and also six points for the 2015–16 season by Hellenic Football Federation.)	Relegation to FCA championships
15	A.O.Kymi (R)	28	0	1	27	1	78	−77	−5 (Note: A.O.Kymi withdrew from the league on 16 October 2014. They were deducted six points for this season and also six points for the 2015–16 season by Hellenic Football Federation.)	Relegation to FCA championships

Source: Hellenic Football Federation (in Greek)
Rules for classification: 1st points; 2nd head-to-head points; 3rd head-to-head goal difference
(C) Champions; (P) Promoted; (R) Relegated

== Group 4 ==
=== Teams ===
Location of teams in Group 4 of 2014–15 Football League 2

Team	Location	Last season
Kissamikos	Kissamos	Group 5, 4th
Irodotos	Nea Alikarnassos	Group 6, 3rd
P.A.O. Krousonas	Krousonas	Group 6, 7th
Giouchtas	Archanes	Group 5, 7th
Anagennisi Ierapetra	Ierapetra	EPS Lasithi champion, promotion play-off Group 14 winner
A.O.Nea Ionia	Nea Ionia	Group 5, 6th
Glyfada	Glyfada	FL South, 13th
Ilisiakos	Zografou	Group 6, 6th
A.E. Kifisia	Kifisia	Group 6, 2nd
Triglia Rafina	Rafina	Group 6, 4th
Asteras Vari	Vari	Group 6, 5th
Atromitos Piraeus	Piraeus (Kaminia neighborhood)	Group 5, 5th
Ethnikos Piraeus	Piraeus	EPS Piraeus champion, promotion play-off Group 9 winner
Ionikos	Nikaia	Group 5, 3rd

=== Standings ===
Pos	Team	Pld	W	D	L	GF	GA	GD	Pts	Promotion or relegation
1	Kissamikos (C, P)	26	15	9	2	37	19	+18	54	Promotion to Football League
2	A.E. Kifisia	26	12	10	4	35	19	+16	46	
3	Ionikos	26	13	5	8	40	25	+15	44	
4	Atromitos Piraeus	26	12	7	7	58	38	+20	43	
5	Ethnikos Piraeus	26	8	10	8	22	22	0	34	
6	Asteras Vari	26	9	7	10	27	33	−6	34	
7	Glyfada	26	10	4	12	26	33	−7	34	
8	Triglia Rafina	26	7	12	7	37	31	+6	33	
9	P.A.O. Krousonas	26	9	5	12	33	37	−4	32	
10	Ilisiakos	26	7	9	10	32	44	−12	30	
11	Irodotos (R)	26	12	8	6	34	25	+9	29 (Note: Irodotos were deducted fifteen points for this season by Hellenic Football Federation.)	Relegation to FCA championships
12	Giouchtas (R)	26	7	8	11	34	32	+2	29	Relegation to FCA championships
13	A.O.Nea Ionia (R)	26	6	9	11	28	38	−10	27	Relegation to FCA championships
14	Anagennisi Ierapetra (R)	26	0	7	19	13	60	−47	7	Relegation to FCA championships

Source: Hellenic Football Federation (in Greek)
Rules for classification: 1st points; 2nd head-to-head points; 3rd head-to-head goal difference
(C) Champions; (P) Promoted; (R) Relegated
