= Marios Papadopoulos =

Marios Papadopoulos may refer to:

- Marios Papadopoulos (footballer)
- Marios Papadopoulos (musician)
