= Kyriakos Mazoulouxis =

Greek footballer

Personal information
- Date of birth: 1 May 1997 (age 29)
- Place of birth: Thessaloniki, Greece
- Height: 1.83 m (6 ft 0 in)
- Position: Centre-back

Team information
- Current team: AEL
- Number: 18

Youth career
- –2013: Poseidon Kalamaria
- 2013−2014: Aris

Senior career*
Years	Team	Apps	(Gls)
2014–2016	Aris	3	(0)
2016–2017	Lierse	4	(0)
2017–2021	Ergotelis	75	(3)
2021–2022	Lamia	14	(1)
2022–2023	A.E. Kifisia	17	(4)
2023–2024	Chania	28	(3)
2024–2025	A.E. Kifisia	22	(4)
2025	Panionios	6	(0)
2025–2026	Struga	24	(1)
2026–	AEL	1	(0)

International career
2017	Greece U21	1	(0)
- * Club domestic league appearances and goals as of 21 September 2026

Kyriakos Mazoulouxis (Greek: Κυριάκος Μαζουλουξής; born 1 May 1997) is a Greek professional footballer who plays as a centre-back for Super League 2 club AEL.

== Club career ==
=== Early years and move to Belgium ===
Mazoulouxis began his career at his local amateur club Poseidon Kalamaria. He made the jump to the more prestigious Aris in the summer of 2013, where he made his senior debut on 10 November 2014, during a Gamma Ethniki match vs. Aris Akropotamos. He then suffered an injury that kept him out for almost 1,5 years, before being fielded once more as a starter during Aris' Gamma Ethniki matchup vs. Vyzantio Kokkinochoma on 17 April 2016.

In July 2016, Mazoulouxis signed a two-year contract with Belgian First Division B side Lierse. He was a regular starter for the Pallieters Reserve outfit, making his senior debut with the club on 6 May 2017 during a 2−1 win vs. Union Saint-Gilloise. In total, Mazoulouxis made 4 senior appearances for Lierse, all during the First Division B Promotion Play-offs.

=== Ergotelis ===
In the summer of 2017, Mazoulouxis was acquired by Greek Football League side Ergotelis, owned by Egyptian businessman Maged Samy, who also owned Lierse at the time. He spent two seasons with the club in the Second Division, fielded as a regular starter. He eventually refused an extension and was therefore waived by the club in the summer of 2019, reportedly joining Super League side Panionios' training sessions in anticipation of an official move in January. However, a deal was eventually not struck between the player and the club, and thus Mazoulouxis returned to Ergotelis in January 2020.

== International career ==
Mazoulouxis has played with the Greek national U-21 football team.

== Career statistics ==
As of matches played 19 May 2021

Club	Season	League			Cup		Europe		Other		Total	
Club	Season	Division	Apps	Goals	Apps	Goals	Apps	Goals	Apps	Goals	Apps	Goals
Aris	2014–15	Gamma Ethniki	1	0	0	0	—		—		1	0
Aris	2015–16	Gamma Ethniki	1	0	0	0	—		—		1	0
Total			2	0	0	0	—		—		2	0
Lierse	2016–17	Belgian First Division B	0	0	0	0	—		4 (Note: Jupiler Pro League Playoff II)	0	4	0
Total			0	0	0	0	—		4	0	4	0
Ergotelis	2017–18	Football League	21	0	3	0	—		—		24	0
Ergotelis	2018–19	Football League	22	3	6	0	—		—		28	3
Ergotelis	2019–20	Super League 2	5	0	0	0	—		—		5	0
Ergotelis	2020–21	Super League 2	27	0	—		—		—		27	0
Total			75	3	9	0	—		—		84	3
Career total			77	3	9	0	—		4	0	90	3

== Honours ==
Aris

- Gamma Ethniki: 2015–16
