= Thyella =

Thyella is a Greek word about the storm. The term Thyella also may refer to:

- Thyella Patras F.C., sport club based in Patras
- Thyella Rafina F.C., sport club based in Rafina
- Thyella Filotas F.C., sport club based in Filotas
- Thyella Katsikas F.C., sport club based in Katsikas
