= Miltiadis Lionis =

Greek footballer

Personal information
- Date of birth: 13 January 1990 (age 36)
- Place of birth: Thessaloniki, Greece
- Height: 1.71 m (5 ft 7 in)
- Position: Left back

Senior career*
Years	Team	Apps	(Gls)
2011–2014	Apollon Pontus	45	(1)
2014–2015	Aris	15	(0)
2015–2016	Iraklis Ambelokipi	0	(0)
2016–2018	Apollon Pontus	25	(1)
2018–2019	Triglia	0	(0)
- * Club domestic league appearances and goals as of 8 July 2018

Miltiadis Lionis is a Greek professional footballer who plays as a left back.
