= Anagennisi Ierapetra F.C. =

Anagennisi Ierapetra
- Full name: Αθλητικός Όμιλος Αναγέννηση Ιεράπετρας; Athlitikós Ómilos Anagénnisi Ierápetra; Athletic Club Anagennisi Ierapetra
- Founded: 1979; 47 years ago
- Ground: Ierapetra Municipal Stadium «Manos Frantzikinakis»
- Capacity: 2,000
- Chairman: Alexandros Michelinakis
- Manager: Mixalis Perakis
- Coach: Kostas Dedeletakis
- League: Lasithi FCA First Division
- 2025–26: Lasithi FCA First Division, 4th
- Website: www.anagennisierapetras.gr

A.O. Anagennisi Ierapetra, short for Athlitikos Omilos Anagennisi Ierapetra (Greek: Αθλητικός Όμιλος Αναγέννηση Ιεράπετρας) and more commonly known as Anagennisi Ierapetra or simply Anagennisi, is a Greek association football club based in Ierapetra, Lasithi, Crete. The club was founded in 1979. The club currently competes in the regional Lasithi FCA A Division Championship, the top-level amateur football division in Lasithi, and host their home games at the «Manos frantzikinakis» Stadium in Ierapetra. Their greatest accomplishments to date include their promotion to the Gamma Ethniki, the third tier of the Greek football league system in 2014, and reaching the Semi-Finals of the Greek Football Amateur Cup in 1993.

== History ==
Anagennisi Ierapetra was established in 1979. Between 1979 and 1982, the club celebrated three promotions, from the B Division of the Lasithi FCA regional league system to the Delta Ethniki, the fourth tier of the Greek football league system. During the 1992−93 season, Anagennisi reached the Greek Football Amateur Cup Semi-Finals for the first time in their history, but were eliminated by eventual competition winners Kozani during penalty shootout. In 2014, they achieved promotion to the Gamma Ethniki for the first time in club history, but were instantly relegated at the end of the season.

== Crest and colours ==
At the start of 2010−11 season, Anagennisi merged with the other two clubs representing the town of Ierapetra, O.F. Ierapetra and A.S. Ierapetra thus forming Ierapetra F.C. However at the end of the season, the merger broke up. For the 2011−12 season, the club was renamed I.F.C. Anagennisi and incorporated its original crest in the I.F.C. logo. Since 2012, the club name and crest were completely restored.

Anagennisi Ierapetra traditional crest.

I.F.C. Anagennisi 2011−12 season crest.

== Honours ==
=== Regional ===
- Lasithi FCA Championship
  - Winners (8): 1983–84, 1986–87, 1988–89, 1995–96, 1997–98, 2004–05, 2007–08, 2013–14
- Lasithi FCA Cup
  - Winners (8): 1992–93, 1994–95, 1995–96, 1996–97, 2002–03, 2008–09, 2010–11 (as I.F.C.), 2012–13
