= Vasco Fernandes (footballer) =

Portuguese footballer

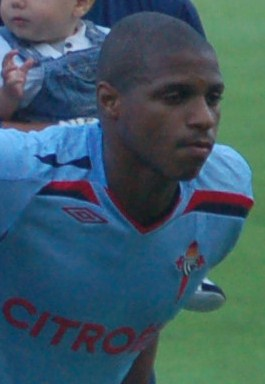
- Fernandes before a game with Celta in 2009

Personal information
- Full name: Vasco Herculano Salgado Cunha Mango Fernandes
- Date of birth: 12 November 1986 (age 39)
- Place of birth: Olhão, Portugal
- Height: 1.82 m (6 ft 0 in)
- Position: Centre-back

Youth career
- 1996–2005: Olhanense

Senior career*
Years	Team	Apps	(Gls)
2005–2007	Olhanense	26	(0)
2005–2006	→ Bordeaux (loan)	0	(0)
2007–2008	Salamanca	18	(0)
2008–2010	Leixões	16	(0)
2009–2010	→ Celta (loan)	28	(0)
2010–2011	Elche	17	(0)
2011–2012	Beira-Mar	0	(0)
2012–2013	Olhanense	33	(0)
2013–2014	Platanias	30	(0)
2014–2015	Aris	24	(2)
2015–2016	Pandurii	28	(0)
2016–2019	Vitória Setúbal	87	(4)
2019–2021	Ümraniyespor	27	(2)
2021	Chaves	16	(0)
2021–2024	Casa Pia	71	(2)
2024–2025	Chaves	35	(1)
Total		456	(11)

International career
2005	Portugal U19	4	(0)
2005–2007	Portugal U20	7	(0)
2007–2008	Portugal U21	11	(0)
2009–2010	Portugal U23	2	(0)
- * Club domestic league appearances and goals

Vasco Herculano Salgado Cunha Mango Fernandes (born 12 November 1986) is a Portuguese former professional footballer who played mainly as a centre-back.

He made 193 Primeira Liga appearances for Leixões, Olhanense, Vitória de Setúbal, Casa Pia and Chaves. Additionally, he represented clubs in Spain, Greece, Romania and Turkey.

== Club career ==
=== Early career ===
Born in Olhão, Algarve of Guinea-Bissauan descent, Fernandes started his professional career with hometown's S.C. Olhanense, making his debut in the Segunda Liga. Before that, he was loaned to FC Girondins de Bordeaux from France, but never appeared officially for the Ligue 1 club.

After moving to Spain, joining UD Salamanca where he teamed up with compatriot Zé Tó, Fernandes returned to Portugal after being bought by Leixões SC. He played roughly half of the games during the season, as the Matosinhos team overachieved for a final sixth place in the Primeira Liga. His debut in the competition took place on 24 August 2008, when he featured the full 90 minutes in a 1–3 home loss against C.D. Nacional.

=== Abroad ===
Fernandes was loaned again for the 2009–10 campaign, also in Spain and in its Segunda División, moving to RC Celta de Vigo. He was much more regularly used than in his previous stint in the country, with the Galicians constantly battling relegation even though they finished 12th.

On 1 July 2010, Fernandes left Leixões permanently and joined Elche CF – still in Spain and its second tier. In the following years he rarely settled with a club, representing S.C. Beira-Mar and Olhanense in his country as well as Platanias FC (Super League) and Aris Thessaloniki FC (lower leagues) in Greece and CS Pandurii Târgu Jiu in the Romanian Liga I.

=== Vitória Setúbal ===
On 3 June 2016, aged 30, Fernandes signed a two-year contract with Vitória F.C. in the Portuguese top flight. He scored his first league goal on 17 September of that year, but in a 1–4 home defeat to F.C. Paços de Ferreira.

Fernandes received the first red card of 2017–18, after being sent off with 20 minutes left of the 1–1 home draw with Moreirense FC. He played five games in their Taça da Liga campaign, opening a 2–2 home draw in the final group fixture against S.L. Benfica on 29 December and starting and finishing the loss to Sporting CP by penalty shootout in the final.

Fernandes stayed for a third season at the Estádio do Bonfim, where he was played consistently and was captain of a side the fans nicknamed "Vasco Fernandes and ten others".

=== Later career ===
In August 2019, Fernandes went abroad again to join Ümraniyespor in Turkey's TFF First League, returning home in January 2021 by signing for G.D. Chaves in his first experience in his country's second division for over a decade. Six months later, he moved to Casa Pia A.C. in the same league, being a key player and scoring twice as the Lisbon-based club ended its 83-year exile from the top flight; he then extended his contract to 2023.

In 2022–23, Fernandes played 30 games as the Geese came 10th in the highest division, plus four more cup matches. The 36-year-old then committed for another season.

Fernandes returned to Chaves on 6 January 2024 on a deal until June 2025, having severed his ties with Casa Pia following a run-in with manager Filipe Martins.

== International career ==
All youth levels comprised, Fernandes won 22 caps for Portugal. He first appeared with the under-21 side on 21 August 2007, starting in a 3–0 friendly win over Malta held in Vila do Conde.

== Personal life ==
Fernandes' father, Herculano, was also a footballer and a defender. He too represented Olhanense and, in a 16-year senior career, appeared in one Portuguese top-division game with Académica de Coimbra; he coached his son in Olhanense's juniors, where he played as a forward.

== Career statistics ==
As of match played 9 December 2023

Appearances and goals by club, season and competition
Club	Season	League			National cup		League cup		Other		Total	
Club	Season	Division	Apps	Goals	Apps	Goals	Apps	Goals	Apps	Goals	Apps	Goals
Olhanense	2004–05	Segunda Liga	0	0	0	0	—		—		0	0
Olhanense	2006–07	Liga de Honra	25	0	2	0	—		—		27	0
Olhanense	2007–08	Liga de Honra	1	0	0	0	1	0	—		2	0
Olhanense	Total		26	0	2	0	1	0	—		29	0
Bordeaux (loan)	2005–06	Ligue 1	0	0	0	0	0	0	—		0	0
Salamanca	2007–08	Segunda División	18	0	0	0	—		—		18	0
Leixões	2008–09	Primeira Liga	16	0	3	0	1	0	—		20	0
Celta (loan)	2009–10	Segunda División	28	0	7	0	—		—		35	0
Elche	2010–11	Segunda División	17	0	0	0	—		1 (Note: Appearance in La Liga play-offs)	0	18	0
Beira-Mar	2011–12	Primeira Liga	0	0	0	0	0	0	—		0	0
Olhanense	2011–12	Primeira Liga	12	0	0	0	0	0	—		12	0
Olhanense	2012–13	Primeira Liga	21	0	2	0	1	0	—		24	0
Olhanense	Total		33	0	2	0	1	0	—		36	0
Platanias	2013–14	Super League Greece	30	0	0	0	—		—		30	0
Aris	2014–15	Gamma Ethniki	24	2	—		—		3 (Note: Appearances in Gamma Ethniki Cup)	0	27	2
Pandurii	2015–16	Liga I	28	0	1	0	1	0	—		30	0
Vitória Setúbal	2016–17	Primeira Liga	31	2	3	0	1	0	—		35	2
Vitória Setúbal	2017–18	Primeira Liga	22	1	1	0	5	1	—		28	2
Vitória Setúbal	2018–19	Primeira Liga	33	1	3	0	1	0	—		37	1
Vitória Setúbal	2019–20	Primeira Liga	1	0	0	0	1	0	—		2	0
Vitória Setúbal	Total		87	4	7	0	8	1	—		102	5
Ümraniyespor	2019–20	TFF First League	18	1	0	0	—		—		18	1
Ümraniyespor	2020–21	TFF First League	9	1	0	0	—		—		9	1
Ümraniyespor	Total		27	2	0	0	—		—		27	2
Chaves	2020–21	Liga Portugal 2	16	0	0	0	—		—		16	0
Casa Pia	2021–22	Liga Portugal 2	31	2	3	0	2	0	—		36	2
Casa Pia	2022–23	Primeira Liga	30	0	2	0	2	0	—		34	0
Casa Pia	2023–24	Primeira Liga	10	0	1	0	3	0	—		14	0
Casa Pia	Total		71	2	6	0	7	0	—		84	2
Career total			421	10	28	0	19	1	4	0	472	11

== Honours ==
Individual

- Liga Portugal 2 Team of the Season: 2021–22
