= Dimitrios Bougiouklis =

Greek footballer (born 1964)

Personal information
- Date of birth: 12 May 1964 (age 62)
- Place of birth: Anatoliko, Greece
- Position: Midfielder

Senior career*
Years	Team	Apps	(Gls)
1986–1995	Aris		
1995	Ethnikos Piraeus		
1996	Kozani		
1997–1998	Olympiacos Volos		

Managerial career
- 2009: Aris (caretaker)
- * Club domestic league appearances and goals

Dimitrios Bougiouklis (Greek: Δημήτριος Μπουγιουκλής; born 12 May 1964) is a Greek former professional footballer who played as a midfielder.
