= Stelios Nakas =

Greek footballer

Personal information
- Full name: Stylianos Nakas
- Date of birth: 27 January 1994 (age 32)
- Place of birth: Volos, Greece
- Height: 1.81 m (5 ft 11 in)
- Position: Attacking midfielder

Team information
- Current team: Brandenburger SC Süd 05

Senior career*
Years	Team	Apps	(Gls)
2012–2014	Skoda Xanthi	12	(1)
2014–	Iraklis Psachna (loan)	10	(1)
2014–2015	Aris (loan)	15	(4)
2015–2016	Niki Volos	2	(1)
2016	Chania	11	(0)
2016–2017	Roccella	7	(0)
2017	Merseburg	14	(3)
2017	Almyros	12	(2)
2018–	Rodos	4	(2)
- * Club domestic league appearances and goals

Stelios Nakas (born 27 January 1994) is a Greek professional footballer. He currently plays for Brandenburger SC Süd 05.
