= Stefanos Dogos =

Greek footballer

Personal information
- Full name: Stefanos Dogos
- Date of birth: 5 May 1994 (age 32)
- Place of birth: Veria, Greece
- Height: 1.74 m (5 ft 8 1/2 in)
- Position: Winger

Team information
- Current team: Naoussa

Youth career
- 2012–2013: Veria

Senior career*
Years	Team	Apps	(Gls)
2013–2015	Veria	3	(0)
2015–2017	Aris	11	(0)
2017–2018	Aiginiakos	3	(0)
2018–2019	Edessaikos	27	(5)
2019–2020	Almopos Aridaea		
2022–	Naoussa		
- * Club domestic league appearances and goals as of 14 August 2022

Stefanos Dogos (Greek: Στέφανος Ντόγος; born 5 May 1994) is a Greek footballer who plays as a winger for Naoussa.

== Career ==
Stefanos signed his first professional contract on 27 December 2013 and made his professional debut during Veria's 5–0 home defeat against Olympiacos. Dogos was released on a free transfer on 31 August 2015.

On 10 July 2019, Stefanos joined Almopos Aridaea.
