= Mauro Poy =

Argentine footballer (born 1981)

Personal information
- Date of birth: 2 July 1981 (age 45)
- Place of birth: Rosario, Argentina
- Height: 1.74 m (5 ft 9 in)
- Position: Forward

Senior career*
Years	Team	Apps	(Gls)
2001–2004	Rosario Central	4	(0)
2004–2005	Racing de Córdoba	46	(5)
2005–2007	Godoy Cruz	68	(11)
2007–2012	Skoda Xanthi	129	(17)
2012–2013	Levadiakos	34	(1)
2013–2014	Panetolikos	5	(0)
2014–2016	Aris	54	(17)
2016–2017	Ergotelis	14	(0)
- * Club domestic league appearances and goals as of 9:50, 25 October 2015 (UTC)

Mauro Poy (born 2 July 1981 in Rosario, Santa Fe) is an Argentine professional footballer, who plays as a forward.

== Career ==
Poy began his football career at his local Primera División side Rosario Central making a total of four appearances in three years. He left the club in 2004, signing with third-tier side Racing de Córdoba where he had 46 appearances and scored 5 goals. In the summer of 2005, Poy signed for Argentine National B Division side Godoy Cruz with whom he had 11 goals in 68 appearances spanning two seasons, in which the club consecutively promoted, and subsequently was demoted to the Argentine Primera División.

After Godoy Cruz was relegated, Poy decided to move to Europe and namely in Greece, signing a contract with Greek Super League club Skoda Xanthi in the summer of 2007. Poy spent the next five years in Skoda Xanthi, having his contract renewed in 2010 and being named third captain of the team for the 2011–2012 season. His contract with the club eventually expired in the summer of 2012. Poy remained in Greece and the Greek Super League after his tenure at Skoda Xanthi, signing with Levadiakos for the 2012–2013 season, and moving to Panetolikos for the 2013–2014 season, where he received substantially fewer playing time, due to injury.

In September 2014 Poy signed for former Greek powerhouse Aris, relegated to the Gamma Ethniki, the third tier of the Greek football league system due to financial troubles. Poy was appointed captain of the club, scoring 14 goals and delivering 8 assists in his first season, as Aris barely missed promotion to the Football League to fellow contender Panserraikos. As the club regrouped for its second consecutive season in the competition, bringing in experienced manager Nikos Anastopoulos, Poy added another 3 goals to help the club celebrate the long-awaited promotion at the end of the season. As he was not in Anastopoulos' plans for Aris' inaugural season in the Football League, Poy was released from his contract in the summer of 2016. He eventually signed for another ex-Super League contender (relegated to the Gamma Ethniki for similar reasons as Aris), Ergotelis in August 2016. His contract was however terminated in January 2017.

== Honours ==
=== Club ===
Godoy Cruz

- Primera B Nacional: 2005–06

Aris

- Gamma Ethniki: 2015–16
