= Gaël Nlundulu =

French footballer (born 1992)

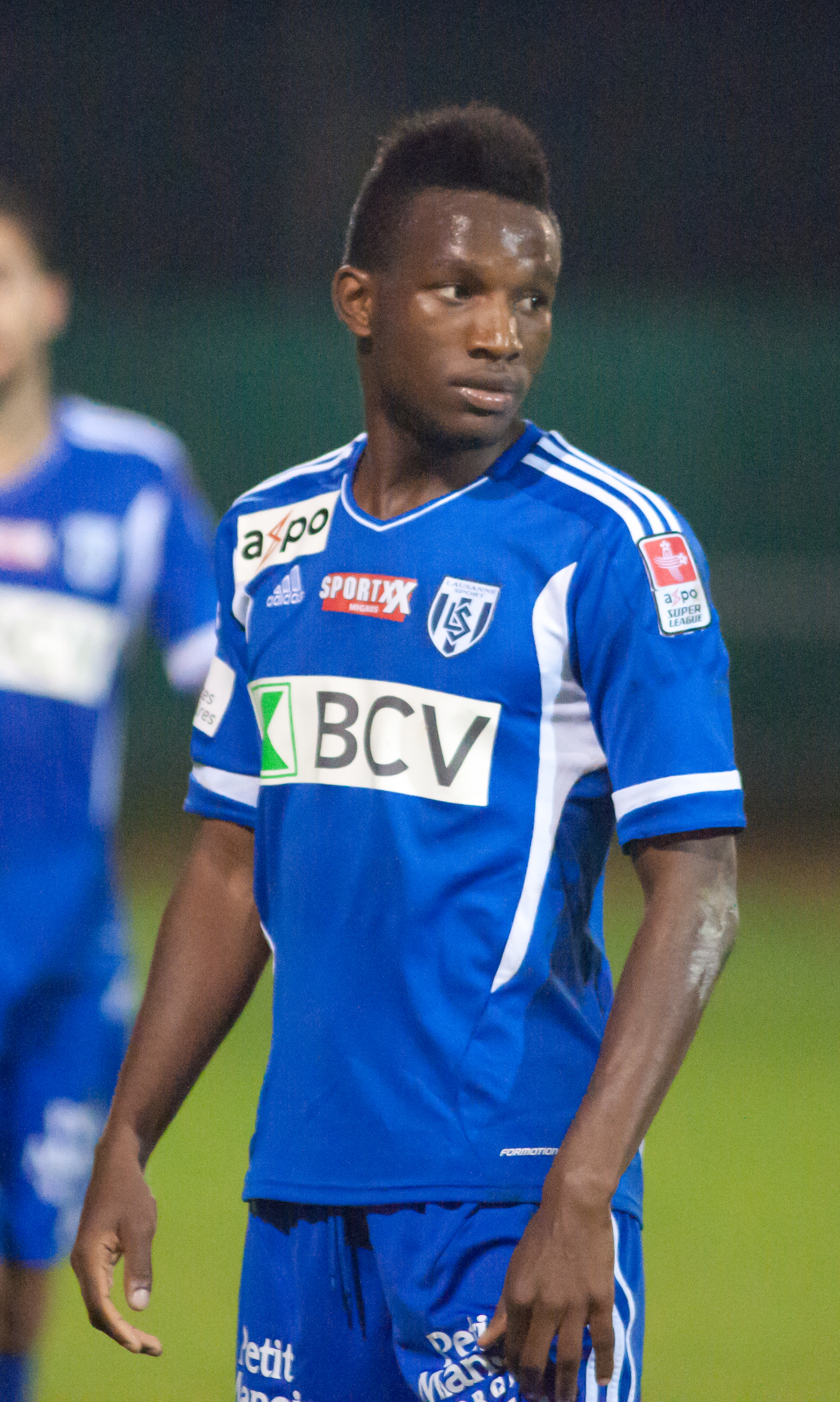
- N'Lundulu with Lausanne-Sport in 2011

Personal information
- Date of birth: 29 April 1992 (age 34)
- Place of birth: Villiers-le-Bel, France
- Height: 1.83 m (6 ft 0 in)
- Position: Left winger

Team information
- Current team: Paris Saint-Germain B

Youth career
- 2004–2008: Paris Saint-Germain
- 2008–2010: Portsmouth

Senior career*
Years	Team	Apps	(Gls)
2009–2010	Portsmouth	0	(0)
2011–2012	Lausanne-Sport	12	(0)
2012–2013	Chernomorets Burgas	24	(2)
2013–2014	Lokomotiv Sofia	22	(2)
2014–2016	Aris	12	(6)
2016–2018	Apollon Pontus	36	(11)
2018	Trikala	9	(0)
2018–2019	Onisilos Sotira	27	(4)
2019–2020	Apollon Paralimnio		
2020–	Paris Saint-Germain B	51 (Note: Statistics unknown for the 2023–24 season.)	(11)

International career
2008	France U19		
- * Club domestic league appearances and goals as of 09:25, 26 June 2023 (UTC)

Gaël Nlundulu (born 29 April 1992) is a French footballer who plays a left winger for Régional 1 side Paris Saint-Germain B.

== Club career ==
=== Paris Saint-Germain ===
Nlundulu first began his footballing career in his hometown with Paris Saint-Germain. By age 16 however, he was ready to move on and sign professional terms with a team away from Paris as PSG were only willing to offer a trainee contract.

=== Portsmouth ===
After much speculation, he signed with Portsmouth in summer 2008 and spent the next two seasons playing primarily for the reserve team, though he did make the bench in a fourth round League Cup match against Stoke City on 27 October 2009. Due to the immense financial difficulties of the English club, N'Lundulu's contract ended in summer 2010.

=== Lausanne-Sport ===
He moved on to Nantes where he went on trial, featuring in several friendlies at the beginning of the season but he was not able to earn himself a contract. Eventually he joined Swiss-side Lausanne-Sport in February 2011. At the end of the 2011–12 season he was released from the club.

=== Aris ===
On 22 August 2014, he signed for Greek club Aris. He did not make any appearances during the first part of the season, but in the second part of the season he was one of Aris's most important players, scoring 5 goals in 11 games. He became a fan favorite due to him scoring wonderful goals. He re-signed with Aris on 5 November. N'Lundulu scored an amazing goal from outside the box in a 3–1 win over Apollon Kalamarias.

=== Apollon Pontou ===
On 30 August 2016 he joined Apollon Pontus. He scored 11 goals, helping his team gain promotion to the Football League.

=== Apollon Paralimnio ===
On 8 August 2019, Nlundulu joined Apollon Paralimnio.

=== Return to Paris Saint-Germain ===
In 2020, Nlundulu joined the amateur reserve side of Paris Saint-Germain.

== International career ==
Nlundulu played for the France U19 national team in 2008.

== Personal life ==
Born in France, Nlundulu is of DR Congolese descent. His brother Dan, is also a footballer.
