= Apollon Arnaia F.C. =

Apollon Arnaia
- Full name: Moysikogymnastikos Omilos Apollon Arnaia
- Founded: 1913; 113 years ago
- Ground: Arnaia Municipal Stadium
- Capacity: 3,000
- Chairman: Isaak Karagiozidis
- Manager: Valantis Touplikiotis
- League: Chalkidiki FCA Third Division
- 2025–26: Chalkidiki FCA Third Division (North Group), 5th
- Website: https://web.archive.org/web/20141014212037/http://apollonarneasfc.blogspot.gr/

Apollon Arnaia Football Club is a Greek football club, based in Arnaia, Chalkidiki.

The club was founded in 1913. They played in Football League 2 for the season 2014–15.

== Honours ==
=== Domestic ===
  - Chalkidiki Regional Championship: 3
    - 1980–81, 2009–10, 2013–14
  - Chalkidiki Regional Cup: 4
    - 1979–80, 2010–11, 2012–13, 2013-14
