= Alexandros Kalogeris =

Greek footballer

Personal information
- Date of birth: 14 May 1986 (age 40)
- Place of birth: Athens, Greece
- Height: 1.83 m (6 ft 0 in)
- Position: Defensive midfielder

Team information
- Current team: Apollon Pontus
- Number: 20

Senior career*
Years	Team	Apps	(Gls)
2006–2008	Marko	0	(0)
2008	PAS Giannina	2	(0)
2008–2010	Keravnos Keratea	62	(5)
2010–2013	Veria	82	(5)
2013–2014	Panetolikos	15	(0)
2014	→ Nea Salamis (loan)	21	(2)
2015–2016	Aris	37	(1)
2016–2024	Apollon Pontus	174	(12)
- * Club domestic league appearances and goals as of 4 September 2024

Alexandros Kalogeris (Greek: Αλέξανδρος Καλογέρης; born 14 May 1986) is a Greek professional footballer who plays as a defensive midfielder for Super League 2 club Apollon Pontus.

== Career ==
Kalogeris signed a two-year contract with Panetolikos on 23 June 2013, after having spent three years playing for Veria.

On 15 January 2015, he signed with Aris.
