= Christos Intzidis =

Greek footballer

Personal information
- Date of birth: 9 January 1993 (age 33)
- Place of birth: Thessaloniki, Greece
- Height: 1.89 m (6 ft 2 in)
- Position: Centre back

Team information
- Current team: Kelantan
- Number: 39

Youth career
- 2002–2012: PAOK

Senior career*
Years	Team	Apps	(Gls)
2012–2014	PAOK	5	(0)
2013	→ Platanias (loan)	13	(0)
2014	→ Levadiakos (loan)	13	(1)
2014	Apollon Limassol	0	(0)
2015	Olympiacos Volos	8	(0)
2015	Panachaiki	0	(0)
2015–2017	Aris	15	(1)
2017	Panegialios	3	(0)
2018	Aiginiakos	1	(0)
2018	South Melbourne	17	(0)
2019	Palanga	5	(0)
2019	Kalamata	10	(0)
2020	FK Csíkszereda	7	(0)
2021–	Kelantan	10	(0)
- * Club domestic league appearances and goals as of 21 March 2021

Christos Intzidis (Greek: Χρήστος Ιντζίδης, born 9 January 1993) is a Greek professional footballer who plays as a centre back for Malaysia Premier League club Kelantan.

== Career ==
=== Youth career ===
Intzidis started his youth career at Ilioupoli. At the age of 8 he moved to the youth academy of Greek powerhouse club, PAOK.

=== PAOK ===
In August 2012, Intzidis signed his first professional contract with the club. The same month, on 9 August 2012, he made his first-team debut against Bnei Yehuda in the UEFA Europa League, replacing Giorgos Katsikas. Despite not starting for PAOK's first-team, the club rated him highly and sent him on loan twice, both to rival Super League 1 teams, to support his development in other strong environments. Christos was a starter at both clubs, Platanias and Levadiakos. He spent a total of 12 years at PAOK before leaving the club at the conclusion of the 2014–15 season, with three years spent as a first-team player.

=== Aris ===
On 20 October 2015 he joined Aris. On 22 July 2016 he signed a 2-year contract extension. On 29 March 2017 the club's administration decided to terminate his contract.

== Honours ==
Aris

- Gamma Ethniki: 2015–16
