= Markos Dounis =

Greek footballer

Personal information
- Date of birth: 9 May 1992 (age 34)
- Place of birth: Athens, Greece
- Height: 1.74 m (5 ft 8 1/2 in)
- Position: Forward

Youth career
- Panionios

Senior career*
Years	Team	Apps	(Gls)
2011–2014	Panionios	53	(7)
2014–2015	AEK Athens	15	(5)
2015–2018	Aris	77	(22)
2018–2019	Iraklis	26	(2)
2019–2020	Olympiacos Volos	16	(3)
2020	Trikala	2	(0)
2020–2021	Pierikos		
2021	Ierapetra	13	(0)
2021–2022	Asteras Vlachioti	11	(0)
2022–2023	Vyzas		
2023	Atromitos Piraeus		
2023–2024	Kyanos Asteras Vari		
2024–2025	Aspropyrgos		
2025–2026	Aetos Korydallos		

International career
2010	Greece U19	2	(0)
- * Club domestic league appearances and goals as of 1 May 2022

Markos Dounis (Greek: Μάρκος Ντούνης, born 9 May 1992) is a Greek professional footballer who plays as a forward.

== Career ==
He started his career at the youth teams of Panionios and was promoted to the first team on 8 July 2007.

=== AEK Athens ===
Before the end of the 2013–14 season Dounis agreed to join AEK Athens on a three-year contract, which was made effective on 1 July 2014. He made his debut on 29 August in 4–0 home win Fokikos for the Greek Cup. On 17 December 2014 he scored his first goal in a comfortable 4–0 win against Fostiras. Despite the three-year duration of his contract, he was released on 11 September 2015, as he wasn't part of the team's plans.

=== Aris ===
On 16 September 2015 he signed for Aris. At the end of the season he celebrated promotion to the Football League. On 30 August 2016, he extended his contract for two seasons. On 12 February 2017, he scored once and was sent-off in a dramatic 2–2 away draw against Apollon Smyrnis.

On 25 November 2017, he scored one goal and had one assist in a dramatic 3–2 away win against Ergotelis, after a catastrophic first half, which found his team being down by two goals. On 7 January 2018, he sealed a 2–0 home win against Apollon Pontus. One week later he opened the score in a 2–0 away win against Apollon Larissa. On 18 March 2018, Dounis came in as a substitute and scored a crucial 88th-minute equalizer with his first ever free-kick goal in a 1–1 away draw against Panachaiki. At the end of the season, he celebrated promotion to the Super League, before leaving the club, following the expiration of his contract.

=== Iraklis ===
On 17 August 2018, he moved to Iraklis on a two-year deal. On 2 December 2018, he scored his first goal for the club in a 3–0 away win against Aittitos Spata.

== Honours ==
AEK Athens

- Football League: 2014–15 (South Group)
