= Billy Konstantinidis =

Greek-Australian former association football player

Personal information
- Full name: Vasilios Konstantinidis
- Date of birth: 21 April 1986 (age 40)
- Place of birth: Melbourne, Australia
- Height: 1.91 m (6 ft 3 in)
- Position: Forward

Senior career*
Years	Team	Apps	(Gls)
2000–2004	East Richmond	?	(3)
2004–2006	Veria	2	(0)
2007–2007	Nafpaktiakos Asteras	9	(0)
2007–2008	Lamia	11	(0)
2008–2010	Niki Volos	38	(2)
2010–2011	Pierikos	32	(1)
2012–2013	Iraklis	17	(7)
2013	Ethnikos Gazoros	19	(1)
2013–2014	Panserraikos	27	(14)
2014	Doxa Drama	15	(10)
2015–2016	Aris Thessaloniki	18	(4)
2016–2017	Veria	4	(0)
2017	Ventforet Kofu	0	(0)
2018–2019	Irodotos	7	(0)
2019	South Melbourne	22	(4)
2020	Ano Mera Mykonos	?	(?)
2020–2022	A.E. Mykonos	?	(?)
- * Club domestic league appearances and goals as of March 23, 2026

Billy Konstantinidis, also known as Vasilis Konstantinidis (Greek: Βασίλης Κωνσταντινίδης, born 21 April 1986) is a Greek-Australian former professional footballer who played as a forward.

== Career ==
He signed for Aris in January 2015 making his debut and scoring against Aris Akropotamos, scoring in the 88th minute. He scored his second goal a 90th-minute winner against Kavala in only his 3rd game and 2nd game at Kleanthis Vikelidis stadium. Konstandinidis plays friendly games for Melbourne City every year. Konstandinidis has been subject of a league interest from the Central Coast Mariners Adelaide United and Melbourne City but a move never materialized.

He returned to Veria on 2 September 2016. On 15 September 2017, he signed a contract with Japanese club Ventforet Kofu.

In February 2019, Konstantinidis returned to Australia, signing on for the 2019 NPL Victoria season with South Melbourne FC. At the end of January 2020, Billy returned to Greece and joined AS Ano Meras, before taking the trip on to A.O. Mykonos in July 2020.
