= Vasilios Rovas =

Greek footballer

Personal information
- Date of birth: 6 January 1984 (age 42)
- Place of birth: Karditsa, Greece
- Height: 1.78 m (5 ft 10 in)
- Positions: Defensive midfielder; defender

Youth career
- –1996: Georgikos Karditsa
- 1996–2000: Elpides Karditsa 1994

Senior career*
Years	Team	Apps	(Gls)
2000–2003	Anagennisi Karditsa		
2003–2004	Pannaxiakos		(8)
2004–2006	Proodeftiki	41	(0)
2006–2009	Atromitos	57	(2)
2009–2010	Aris	6	(0)
2010	→ PAS Giannina (loan)	11	(0)
2010–2012	OFI	7	(0)
2012–2013	Panionios	24	(0)
2013	Apollon Smyrnis	19	(0)
2013–2015	AEK Athens	38	(0)
2015–2017	Aris	42	(0)
2017–2018	Asteras Amaliada	19	(0)
2018–2019	Niki Volos	19	(0)
2019–2020	Anagennisi Karditsa	0	(0)
- * Club domestic league appearances and goals as of 04:15, 20 May 2017 (UTC)

Vasilios Rovas (Greek: Βασίλειος Ρόβας; born 6 January 1984) is a Greek former professional footballer who played as a defensive midfielder.

== Career ==
His first football steps made to Proodeftiki. Then Atromitos for three years, where he was most of the time, a key member of the lineup. In 2009, he signed for Aris, but failed to establish itself as a key and so was loaned PAS Giannina in the second half of season 2009–10. In August 2010 he moved to OFI, where there was large contributor to the team. In January 2012 he moved to Panionios. There he stayed until December of that year, when he decided to leave to try his luck abroad, but the agreement with the team abroad was not completed, so continue career at Apollon Smyrnis, who at the end of the season was crowned champion B 'National Division and promoted to the Super League. On 1 July 2013, having remained free from Apollon, announced he's agreement with AEK, in his first year he participated in 18 league matches, while the second 16. In September 2015, after five years absence, he returned to Aris

== Honours ==
AEK Athens

- Football League: 2014–15 (South Group)
- Football League 2: 2013–14 (6th Group)
