= Charalampos Pavlidis =

Greek footballer (born 1991)

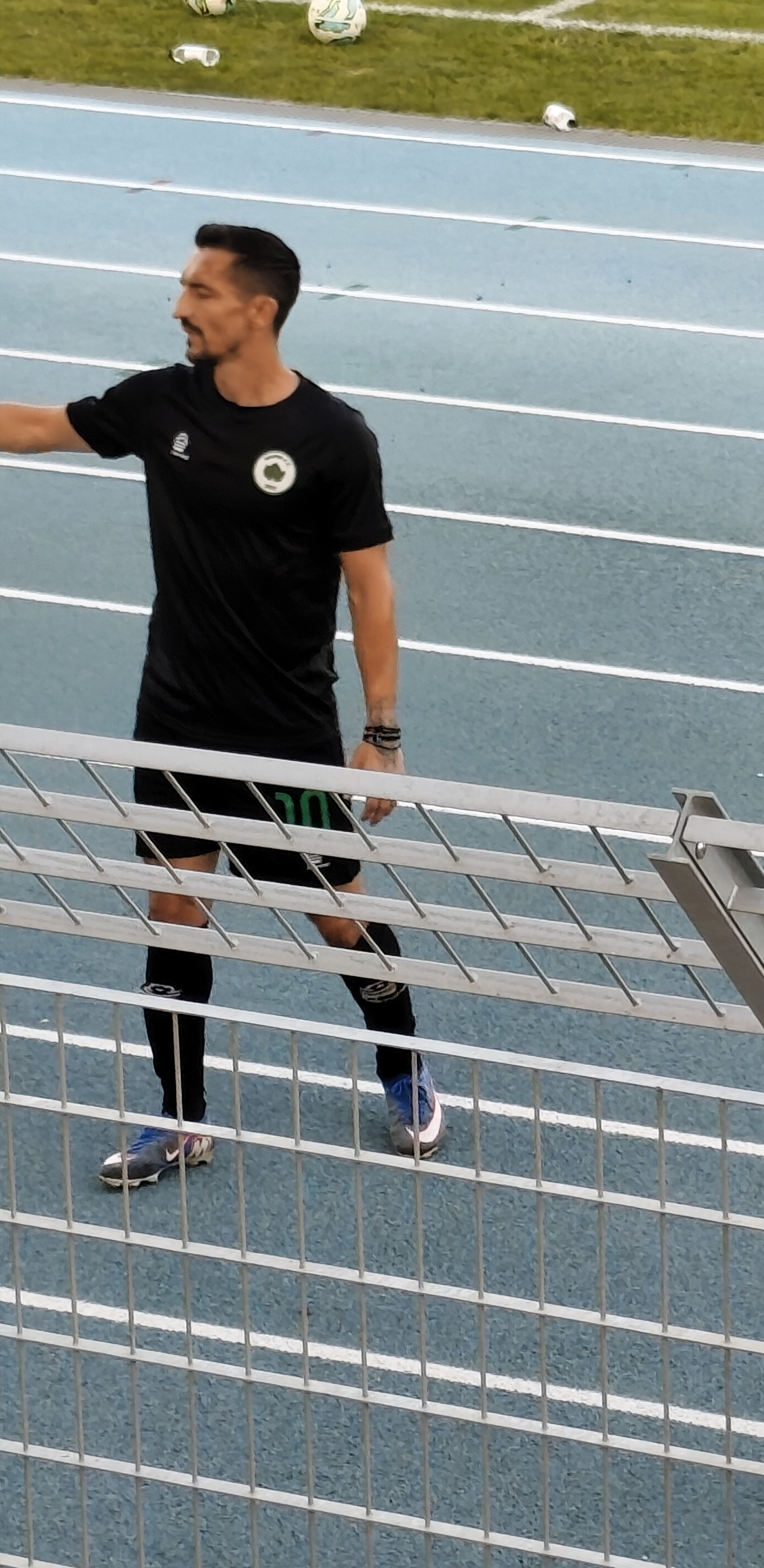
- Charalampos Pavlidis, taken during the Marko 1927 F.C. friendly match vs AO Karystos F.C. on 13/08/2026

Personal information
- Date of birth: 6 May 1991 (age 35)
- Place of birth: Veria, Greece
- Height: 1.79 m (5 ft 10 in)
- Position: Attacking midfielder

Team information
- Current team: Marko
- Number: 10

Youth career
- –2009: Aetos Skydra

Senior career*
Years	Team	Apps	(Gls)
2009–2015	Veria	45	(1)
2011–2012	→ Eordaikos (loan)	10	(2)
2012	→ Niki Volos (loan)	20	(4)
2015–2019	Aris	52	(6)
2019–2020	Apollon Smyrnis	8	(0)
2020	→ Veria (loan)	5	(0)
2020–2022	Kalamata	47	(2)
2022–2023	Proodeftiki	21	(3)
2023–	Marko	49	(12)
- * Club domestic league appearances and goals as of 21 March 2026

Charalampos Pavlidis (Greek: Χαράλαμπος Παυλίδης; born 6 May 1991) is a Greek professional footballer who plays as an attacking midfielder for Super League 2 club Marko.

== Career ==
Charalampos started his professional career in Veria. He official debuted with Veria in 2008–09 season. He also spent six months on loan in Eordaikos where he performed in ten matches, scoring two goals. In January 2012, Niki Volos signed on loan for six months Charalampos, where he played in twenty matches and scored four goals. On 14 July 2015, Pavlidis signed a new contract with Veria. His new contract is set to expire on 30 June 2018.

=== Aris ===
On 11 September 2015, he joined Gamma Ethniki club Aris. On 21 July 2016, he renewed his contract for two more seasons.

On 3 July 2018, after a fantastic season, in which Aris managed to secure promotion to the Super League after four years of absence, Pavlidis agreed to a three-year contract extension.

On 12 June 2019, he terminated his contract with the club by mutual consent.

=== Apollon Smyrnis ===
On 26 June 2019, he joined Apollon Smyrnis on a free transfer.

=== Marko ===
In August 2023, he joined Marko on a free transfer.
