= Antonis Kapnidis =

Greek footballer

Personal information
- Full name: Antonios Kapnidis
- Date of birth: 15 August 1992 (age 34)
- Place of birth: Thessaloniki, Greece
- Height: 1.86 m (6 ft 1 in)
- Position: Forward

Team information
- Current team: Chania
- Number: 12

Youth career
- –2011: Iraklis

Senior career*
Years	Team	Apps	(Gls)
2011–2012	Agrotikos Asteras	30	(1)
2012–2013	Doxa Drama	2	(0)
2013	Anagennisi Giannitsa	20	(1)
2013–2014	Kavala	22	(6)
2014–2018	Aris	91	(41)
2018	Doxa Drama	6	(0)
2018–2019	Ergotelis	18	(1)
2019–2020	Digenis Morphou	20	(8)
2020–2021	Xanthi	21	(6)
2021–2022	Panevėžys	14	(2)
2022	Veria	21	(0)
2022–2023	Chania	8	(0)
2023	Proodeftiki	16	(2)
2023	San Luca	8	(2)
2023–2024	Gallipoli	16	(3)
2024	Acireale	13	(2)
2024–2025	Notaresco	19	(5)
2025–2026	Makedonikos	17	(0)
2026–	Chania	8	(5)
- * Club domestic league appearances and goals as of 21 April 2026

Antonis Kapnidis (Greek: Αντώνης Καπνίδης, born 15 August 1992) is a Greek professional footballer who plays as a forward for Greek Super League 2 club Chania.

== Career ==
Kapnidis began his career at the infrastructure segments of his hometown club, Iraklis. At age 19, Kapnidis was transferred to Agrotikos Asteras in the second division, where he had 31 appearances and scored one goal. In the summer of 2012, he signed with Doxa Drama, where he stayed until January 2013. He then moved to Anagennisi Giannitsa, where he had 20 appearances and one goal by the end of the year. In the 2013–14 season, he played for Football League North side Kavala, scoring seven times in 23 matches.

His performances with Kavala drew the attention of renowned former Super League regulars Aris, which at the time played in the third national Division, due to financial problems. In his first season with Aris, Kapnidis scored 10 goals in 30 appearances, but the club narrowly missed out on promotion as they finished in second place. In his second season with the club, Kapnidis scored 21 goals in 29 appearances, helping Aris promote to the Football League. On 12 July 2016, he was rewarded for his outstanding performances, with a new three-year contract. His playing time was however significantly limited, and on 30 January 2018 Kapnidis opted to terminate his contract with the club on mutual consent.

He signed with fellow Football League side Doxa Drama, but made only 6 appearances for the club before being released from his contract after filing a claim against the club for unpaid wages. In the summer of 2018, Kapnidis joined fellow Football League team Ergotelis on a two-year contract.

In July 2021 he signed a year contract with Lithuanian FK Panevėžys.

== Personal life ==
His father Thanasis Kapnidis (1955–2025) was an artistic gymnastics trainor. He was the trainer of Ioannis Melissanidis and Dimosthenis Tampakos.

== Career statistics ==
As of matches played 6 October 2021

Club	Season	League			Cup		Other		Total	
Club	Season	Division	Apps	Goals	Apps	Goals	Apps	Goals	Apps	Goals
Agrotikos Asteras	2011–12	Football League	30	1	1	0	—		31	1
Total			30	1	1	0	—		31	1
Doxa Drama	2012–13	Football League	2	0	1	0	—		3	0
Total			2	0	1	0	—		3	0
Anagennisi Giannitsa	2012–13	Football League	20	1	0	0	—		20	1
Total			20	1	0	0	—		20	1
Kavala	2013–14	Football League	22	6	1	1	—		23	7
Total			22	6	1	1	—		23	7
Aris	2014–15	Gamma Ethniki	30	10	—		2 (Note: Gamma Ethniki Cup)	2	32	12
Aris	2015–16	Gamma Ethniki	29	21	—		0 (Note: Macedonia FCA Cup)	0	29	21
Aris	2016–17	Football League	27	9	5	1	—		32	10
Aris	2017–18	Football League	5	1	1	0	—		6	1
Total			91	41	6	1	2	2	99	44
Doxa Drama	2017–18	Football League	6	0	0	0	—		6	0
Total			6	0	0	0	—		6	0
Ergotelis	2018–19	Football League	18	1	7	1	—		25	2
Total			18	1	7	1	—		25	2
Digenis Morphou	2019–20	Cypriot Second Division	20	8	0	0	—		20	8
Total			20	8	0	0	—		20	8
Xanthi F.C.	2020–21	Super League Greece 2	21	6	3	0	—		24	6
Total			21	6	3	0	—		24	6
FK Panevėžys	2021	A Lyga	10	2	1	0	2	0	13	2
Total			10	2	1	0	2	0	13	2
Career total			240	66	20	3	4	2	264	71
