= Dimitrios Samaras =

Greek footballer

Personal information
- Full name: Dimitrios Samaras
- Date of birth: 3 June 1978 (age 48)
- Place of birth: Thessaloniki, Greece
- Height: 1.87 m (6 ft 2 in)
- Position: Centre back

Youth career
- Lykoi

Senior career*
| Years | Team | Apps | (Gls) |
| 2005–2009 | Veria | 95 | (5) |
| 2009–2010 | Doxa Drama | 31 | (3) |
| 2010–2012 | Veria | 53 | (3) |
| 2012–2013 | Niki Volos | 35 | (2) |
| 2013–2014 | Aiginiakos | 34 | (2) |
| 2014–2015 | Tyrnavos | 6 | (0) |
| 2015–2016 | Aris | 33 | (3) |
| 2016–2020 | Apollon Pontus | 53 | (1) |
| 2020–2023 | Foinikas Polichni | | |
- * Club domestic league appearances and goals as of 17 January 2020

Dimitrios Samaras (Greek: Δημήτριος Σαμαράς; born 3 June 1978) is a Greek footballer who plays as a centre back.

== Career ==
Born in Thessaloniki, Samaras spent most of his youth career playing for Lykoi in the Greek third division. In January 2005, he signed for Veria and would eventually play with the club in the Super League Greece during the 2007–08 season.
