= Marios Papadopoulos (footballer) =

Greek footballer

Personal information
- Full name: Marios Papadopoulos
- Date of birth: 10 December 1992 (age 33)
- Place of birth: Naoussa, Greece
- Height: 1.79 m (5 ft 10 in)
- Position: Attacking midfielder

Team information
- Current team: Ierapetra
- Number: 10

Youth career
- –2007: Makedonikos

Senior career*
Years	Team	Apps	(Gls)
2007–2011	Makedonikos	45	(11)
2011–2012	Pontioi Katerini	0	(0)
2012–2014	Agrotikos Asteras	55	(17)
2014–2015	Veria	0	(0)
2014–2015	→ Aris (loan)	24	(4)
2015–2016	Pierikos	14	(3)
2015–2016	Doxa Drama	15	(1)
2016–2017	Niki Volos	3	(2)
2017	Tilikratis	14	(3)
2017–	Ierapetra	14	(2)

International career
2010–2011	Greece U17	3	(0)
- * Club domestic league appearances and goals as of 17 August 2020

Marios Papadopoulos (Greek: Μάριος Παπαδόπουλος; born 10 December 1992) is a Greek professional footballer who plays as an attacking midfielder for Football League club Ierapetra.

== Career ==
Marios started his career in the Makedonikos youth team. In 2007, he was promoted to the first squad and spend four years playing for the club. During the summer transfer window of 2011, he left Makedonikos to join Pontioi Katerini but he was released from the club the same season, during the winter transfer window. In January 2012, he was signed by Agrotikos Asteras on a free transfer. During season 2012–2013 Marios, was a team regular with Agrotikos Asteras where he played 55 games and scored 17 goals. He got the attention of Veria's scouting team and he was signed in during the summer transfer window of 2014. Marios signed a 3-year contract with the Super League club. This was the first professional team that he joined.

On 27 September 2014 Marios moved to Aris on loan for one year. Papadopoulos' loan was finished on 30 June 2015 and he returned to Veria.

Marios was also member of the Greece U17 squad during 2010–2011 season.

He was released on a free transfer in January 2015 and he signed a contract with Aris.

== Personal life ==
Marios was born in Naousa, Greece. He is the son of the former football player and coach Alekos Papadopoulos (Greek: Αλέκος Παπαδόπουλος) who's the fourth all time goalscorer of Veria.
