= Ethnikos Neo Agioneri F.C. =

Ethnikos Neo Agioneri
- Full name: Athlitikos Omilos Neo Agioneri Kilkis
- Founded: 1973
- Ground: Municipal Stadium of Kilkis
- Capacity: 6,000
- Chairman: Kadopoulos Georgios
- Manager: Georgios Georgiadis
- League: Gamma Ethniki
- 2015-16: Gamma Ethniki (Group 1) 7th
- Website: http://www.ethnikosneouagioneriou.gr/

Old Logo of the team

Ethnikos Neo Agioneri F.C. is a Greek football club, based in Neo Agioneri, Kilkis.

The club was founded in 1973. They will play for 3rd year in Gamma Ethniki for the season 2015-16.
