= Aris Akropotamos F.C. =

Aris Akropotamos
- Full name: Aris Akropotamos Football Club
- Founded: 1974
- Ground: Municipal Stadium of Akropotamos(W.Paggaio); Akropotamos, Kavala, Greece
- Chairman: Paraskeuas Christos
- Manager: Ignatiadis Stylianos
- League: Football League 2 (Group 1)
- 2014-15: Football League 2 (Group 1) 12th, relegated
- Website: http://arisakropotamoufc.gr

Aris Akropotamos F.C. (Greek: Α.Σ. Άρης Ακροποτάμου) is a Greek football club based in Akropotamos, Kavala.

== History ==
Aris was founded in 1975 by Chatzistavrou Ippokratis, starting in the local leagues. After Ippokratis' death the following year, Deligiorgis Nicholas succeeded him as chairman. That season, 1976–1977, led by Koutoulas Georgios, Chatziandreou Iraklis, and Chrysostomos Konstantinidis, Aris eventually rose to the promotion playoffs of the A Category of the Eps Kavala. However, Aris would fall short.

In the 1983–1984 season, Aris hired former Panathinaikos player Pavlos Kopsacheilis as manager.

In the following years the team is between b and c category of Eps Kavala. Served by presidents: Gravanis Athanasios, Pateras Mixail, Makaridis Stavros, Iosifidis Iosif and Sarrinikolaou Vasileios which served the longest period.

In the 2003–2004 season, Aris were crowned champions in C category. They stayed in the B category for the subsequent seasons.

From the 2007–2008 season and today with chairman Christos Paraskevas, framed by a group of people to support him, the team promotes almost every year category culminating with participation in the regional championship of the fourth national.

The 2010–2011 season participates in the final of the Cup of Eps Kavala and crowned Cup Champion defeating A.E Piereon 2–0.

The 2011–2012 season in his first participation in the regional championship takes the second position and reaches back to the Cup final but loses the trophy from Orpheas Eleftheroupoli.

== Honors ==
=== Domestic Titles and honors ===
  - Fourth Division: 1
    - 2013
  - Kavala Regional Cup: 1
    - 2011
