= Iraklis Ampelokipi F.C. =

Association football club in Greece

A.S. Iraklis Ampelokipon
- Full name: Athlitikos Syllogos Iraklis Ampelokipon
- Short name: A.S. Iraklis Ampelokipon
- Founded: 1980; 46 years ago
- Ground: Ampelokipoi Municipal Stadium "Konstantinos Karamanlis"
- Capacity: 4,000
- League: Macedonia FCA Third Division
- 2024–25: Macedonia F.C.A. A1 Division, 16th (relegated)

Athlitikos Syllogos Iraklis Ampelokipon is a football club, based in Ampelokipoi, Thessaloniki, Greece and it was founded in 1980.

Former crest

== Honours ==
=== Domestic ===
- Delta Ethniki
  - Winners (1): 2012–13
- Macedonia F.C.A. Championship
  - Winners (1): 2011–12
