= Vyzantio Kokkinochoma F.C. =

Vyzantio Kokkinochoma
- Full name: Athlitikos Syllogos Vyzantio Kokkinochoma
- Founded: 1947; 79 years ago
- Ground: Kokkinochoma Stadium
- Chairman: Stathis Michailidis
- Manager: Pantelis Stylianou
- League: Kavala FCA First Division
- 2025–26: Kavala FCA First Division, 6th
- Website: http://www.byzantio-fc.com/
Home colours	Away colours

Vyzantio Kokkinochoma F.C. (Greek: Γ.Σ. Βυζάντιο Κοκκινοχώματος) is a Greek football club based in Kokkinochoma, Kavala.

The club was founded in 1947. They will play for 3rd year in Gamma Ethniki for the season 2015–16.

In May 2025, the team avoided relegation and remains in the Kavala Football Clubs Association's First Division. In advance of the 2025-2026 season, the team announced the upcoming player roster of Vasilis Petrodimopoulos, Kostas Salpingidis, Tasos Mavreas, Giorgos Vasiliadis, Christos Stavridis, Lazaros Nikolaidis, Giorgos Naoumidis, Kyriakos Vouzoulidis, Raphael Provatidis and Konstantinos Gaitatzis.
