= Thyella Filotas F.C. =

Thyella Filotas
- Full name: E.MA.S. Thyella Filotas
- Founded: 1952; 74 years ago
- Ground: Florina Municipal Stadium
- Capacity: 4,600
- League: Florina FCA Second Division
- 2025–26: Florina FCA Second Division, 3rd
- Website: https://www.filotasfc.gr

Thyella Filotas Football Club is a Greek football club based in Filotas, Florina, Greece.

The club was founded in 1952.

the club has also played in the Greek third division in the 2015/16 season and faced the likes of Aris Thessalonikis , Doxa Dramas and Apollon Kalamarias . The team finished 13th in the league and got relegated.

== Honours ==
=== Domestic ===
  - Florina Regional Championship: 2
    - 1987–88, 2013–14
  - Florina Regional Cup: 1
    - 2013–14
