= 2013–14 Gamma Ethniki Cup =

Tournament details
- Country: Greece
- Teams: 93

Final positions
- Champions: AEL
- Runners-up: Panelefsiniakos

Tournament statistics
- Matches played: 96
- Goals scored: 222 (2.31 per match)

The 2013–14 Gamma Ethniki Cup was the first edition of the Gamma Ethniki Cup, a Greek football Cup competition, wherein only the clubs of the Gamma Ethniki (the third tier of the Greek football league system) were allowed to participate. The Cup winner competed at the end of the season with the winner of the 2013–14 Amateurs' Cup for the 2014 Amateurs' Super Cup.

== First round ==
In first round of the competition, the clubs in each group competed against each other in single matches (overtime and penalties applied) until one club was declared group winner. The competing pairs were selected as a result of random drawing that took place on 2 September 2013. The match days of the First Round were set on 14/15/16 September 2013 for Match-Day 1, 13/14 October 2013 for Match-Day 2, 17/18 November 2013 for Match-Day 3 and 15 December 2013 for each group final.

== Group 1 ==
Location of teams in group 1 of 2013–14 Football League 2

=== Matchday 1 ===
Team 1	Score	Team 2
Makedonikos	1–1 (2–3 p)	PAOK Kosmio
Panserraikos	1–1 (7–8 p)	Kilkisiakos
Orfeas Elefteroupoli	3–1 (a.e.t.)	Iraklis Ambelokipi
Vyzantio Kokkinochoma	0–1	Digenis Lakkoma
Doxa Petroussa	2–1	Ethnikos Neo Agioneri
Evros Soufli	0–1	Aris Akropotamos
Agrotikos Asteras	2–1	Nestos Chrysoupoli
Ethnikos Sidirokastro	3–2 (a.e.t.)	P.O. Moudania

=== Matchday 2 ===
Team 1	Score	Team 2
Orfeas Elefteroupoli	2–1	PAOK Kosmio
Digenis Lakkoma	2–2 (5–4 p)	Doxa Petroussa
Aris Akropotamos	0–0 (4–2 p)	Kilkisiakos
Ethnikos Sidirokastro	2–4	Agrotikos Asteras

=== Matchday 3 ===
Team 1	Score	Team 2
Aris Akropotamos	0–2	Agrotikos Asteras
Digenis Lakkoma	3–0	Orfeas Elefteroupoli

=== Group 1 final ===
Team 1	Score	Team 2
Digenis Lakkoma*	0–1	Agrotikos Asteras

* Note: Digenis Lakkoma even if have been defeated, qualified to the quarter-finals, as favored in the draw between the groups' finalists.

== Group 2 ==
Location of teams in group 2 of 2013–14 Football League 2

=== Matchday 1 ===
Team 1	Score	Team 2
Kastor	0–1	Kampaniakos
Olympos Kerkyra	0–2	Odysseas Kordelio
Ethnikos Filippiada	3–0	Pyrsos Grevena
Thesprotos	0–1 (a.e.t.)	AEL
Kastoria	4–0	Doxa Kranoula
Preveza	0–3	Oikonomos
Tilikratis	0–3 (w/o)	Doxa Pentalofos
Kozani	2–1	Keravnos Thesprotiko

=== Matchday 2 ===
Team 1	Score	Team 2
Odysseas Kordelio	0–2	Kozani
Ethnikos Filippiada	1–0	Oikonomos
Kampaniakos	1–0	Kastoria
Doxa Pentalofos	0–4	AEL

=== Matchday 3 ===
Team 1	Score	Team 2
Kozani	1–0	Kampaniakos
Ethnikos Filippiada	0–1	AEL

=== Group 2 final ===
Team 1	Score	Team 2
AEL	3–1	Kozani*

* Note: Kozani even if have been defeated, qualified to the quarter-finals, as favored in the draw between the groups' finalists.

== Group 3 ==
Location of teams in group 3 of 2013–14 Football League 2

=== Matchday 1 ===
Team 1	Score	Team 2
Achilleas Domokos	0–0 (3–5 p)	Chalkida
Lamia	0–2	Achilleas Neokaisareia
Lefkadia	2–1	Makrochori
A.O Karditsa	1–2 (a.e.t.)	Rigas Feraios
A.O. Trikala 1963	3–1	Pyrgetos
Ampeloniakos	1–0	Dotieas Agia
Machitis Terpsithea	2–1	Naoussa

- A.O.Kymi advance to Match-day 2 on walkover.

=== Matchday 2 ===
Team 1	Score	Team 2
A.O. Trikala 1963	1–0	Chalkida
Achilleas Neokaisareia	2–1	Machitis Terpsithea
Lefkadia	0–2	A.O.Kymi
Ampeloniakos	0–1	Rigas Feraios

=== Matchday 3 ===
Team 1	Score	Team 2
Achilleas Neokaisareia	1–1 (7–6 p)	A.O.Kymi
Rigas Feraios	2–1	A.O. Trikala 1963

=== Group 3 final ===
Team 1	Score	Team 2
Rigas Feraios	2–3	Achilleas Neokaisareia

== Group 4 ==
Location of teams in group 4 of 2013–14 Football League 2

=== Matchday 1 ===
Team 1	Score	Team 2
PAO Varda	1–0	Panargiakos
Aris Aitoliko	2–2 (3–4 p)	Kalamata
Messiniakos	1–0	Korinthos
Panarkadikos	1–1 (1–3 p)	Asteras Amaliada
Achaiki	0–0 (3–5 p)	A.E. Messolongi
Doxa Nea Manolada	1–1 (3–4 p)	Ethnikos Sageika
Atromitos Achaea	3–0	Enosi Ermionida
Pannafpliakos	0–1	A.E. Karaiskakis

=== Matchday 2 ===
Team 1	Score	Team 2
A.E. Messolongi	1–2	Kalamata
A.E. Karaiskakis	1–3	Asteras Amaliada
Atromitos Achaea	1–1 (5–3 p)	PAO Varda
Ethnikos Sageika	2–1 (a.e.t.)	Messiniakos

=== Matchday 3 ===
Team 1	Score	Team 2
Asteras Amaliada	0–1	Kalamata
Ethnikos Sageika	1–2 (a.e.t.)	Atromitos Achaea

=== Group 4 final ===
Team 1	Score	Team 2
Atromitos Achaea	1–0	Kalamata

== Group 5 ==
Location of teams in group 5 of 2013–14 Football League 2

=== Matchday 1 ===
Team 1	Score	Team 2
Ethnikos Asteras	2–3 (a.e.t.)	Atsalenios
Panelefsiniakos	3–2	Proodeftiki
A.O. Nea Ionia	0–0 (4–3 p)	Giouchtas
Kissamikos	2–0	A.O Pefki
Atromitos Piraeus	1–2	Olympiakos Laurium
A.O. Mykonos	0–1	Rouvas
Trachones	2–0	Doxa Vyronas

- Ionikos advance to Match-day 2 on walkover.

=== Matchday 2 ===
Team 1	Score	Team 2
Kissamikos	0–0 (5–3 p)	Atsalenios
Olympiakos Laurium	2–1	A.O. Nea Ionia
Trachones	0–2	Panelefsiniakos
Ionikos	2–0	Rouvas

=== Matchday 3 ===
Team 1	Score	Team 2
Panelefsiniakos	3–0	Olympiakos Laurium
Ionikos	1–0 (a.e.t.)	Kissamikos

=== Group 5 final ===
Team 1	Score	Team 2
Ionikos	0–1 (a.e.t.)	Panelefsiniakos

== Group 6 ==
Location of teams in group 6 of 2013–14 Football League 2

=== Matchday 1 ===
Team 1	Score	Team 2
Irodotos	1–1 (3–5 p)	A.E. Kifisia
Ermis Zoniana	0–3	Mandraikos
Pannaxiakos	0–1	Asteras Vari
A.O. Agios Nikolaos	2–1	P.A.O. Krousonas
A.O. Peristeri	0–1	Thyella Rafina
Egaleo	1–2	Triglia Rafina
Ilisiakos	2–0	Peramaikos

- AEK Athens advance to Matchday 2 on walkover.

=== Matchday 2 ===
Team 1	Score	Team 2
Mandraikos	0–1	Asteras Vari
Triglia Rafina	0–3	Thyella Rafina
A.O. Agios Nikolaos	3–2	A.E. Kifisia
Ilisiakos	0–3	AEK Athens

=== Matchday 3 ===
Team 1	Score	Team 2
Asteras Vari	2–0	Thyella Rafina
AEK Athens	5–0	A.O. Agios Nikolaos

=== Group 6 final ===
Team 1	Score	Team 2
AEK Athens	1–0	Asteras Vari

== Bracket ==
Quarter-finals
29 December 2013 – Kozani
Kozani	1
AEL (aet)	2
29 December 2013 – Thessaloniki
Agrotikos Asteras (aet)	2
AEK Athens	0
29 December 2013 – Neokaisareia
Achilleas Neokaisareia	0
Panelefsiniakos	1
29 December 2013 – Lakkoma
Digenis Lakkoma	0
Atromitos Achaea	1

Semi-finals
22 January / 22 February 2014
AEL (agg.)	3
Agrotikos Asteras	3
22 January / 23 February 2014
Panelefsiniakos (agg.)	3
Atromitos Achaea	0

Final
5 April 2014 – Livadeia
AEL	2
Panelefsiniakos	1

== Quarter-finals ==
In the Second Round of the competition (quarter-finals), the 6 group winners and two group finalists (selected randomly in a draw that took place on 19 December 2013) competed against each other in single knock-out matches at the home ground of the club favored by the draw. All matches were held on 29 December 2013.

29 December 2013

Kozani	1–2 (a.e.t.)	AEL
Karampatzakis 44' (pen.)	Report	Nebegleras 47'; Kalfas 92' (o.g.)

Kozani Stadium, Kozani
Referee: Konstantinos Balatsoukas (Zakynthos)

29 December 2013

Agrotikos Asteras	2–0 (a.e.t.)	AEK Athens
Krystalis 106'; Lazaridis 109'	Report

Kaftanzoglio Stadium, Thessaloniki
Referee: Christos Granas (Xanthi)

29 December 2013

Achilleas Neokaisareia	0–1	Panelefsiniakos
	Report	Michelis 48'

Neokaisareia Municipal Stadium, Pieria
Referee: Evangelos Kiotzenis (Xanthi)

29 December 2013

Digenis Lakkoma	0–1	Atromitos Achaea
	Report	Grammatikopoulos 13'

Lakkoma Stadium, Chalkidiki
Referee: Fotis Fotiadis (Kastoria)

== Semi-finals ==
In the Third Round of the competition (semi-finals), the four clubs advancing from the Quarter-finals competed in double knockout matches (away goals rule) and the two winners advanced to the final. The first Leg was held on 22 January 2014 and second Leg on 23 February 2014

=== First leg ===
22 January 2014

AEL	1–1	Agrotikos Asteras
Gkourtsas 75'	Report	Agtzidis 92' (o.g.)

Alcazar Stadium, Larissa
Referee: Evangelos Kordolemis (East Attica)

22 January 2014

Panelefsiniakos	3–0	Atromitos Achaea
Konstantinidis 6'; Souleles 23'; Kouskounas 65'	Report

Elefsina Municipal Stadium, Elefsina
Referee: Georgios Michailidis (Boeotia)

=== Second leg ===
22 February 2014

Agrotikos Asteras	2–2	AEL
Papadopoulos 74', 80'	Report	Gkourtsas 24'; Bledi 90'

Agrotikos Asteras Stadium, Thessaloniki
Referee: Vasilios Panagiotopoulos (Aetoloacarnania)

23 February 2014

Atromitos Achaea	0–0	Panelefsiniakos
	Report

Kostas Davourlis Stadium, Patras
Referee: Alexandros Katsikogiannis (Epirus)

== Final ==
5 April 2014
17:00

Panelefsiniakos	1–2	AEL
Kouskounas 22' (pen.)	Report	Stefanidis 4' (pen.), 28'

Levadia Municipal Stadium, Levadia
Referee: Spyridon Selimos (Laconia)

Panelefsiniakos	AEL

Panelefsiniakos:
GK	1	(Greece) Manthos Tsakiltzidis
DF	?	(Greece) Theodoros Koumparoulis
DF	?	(Greece) Giorgos Kokkinis
DF	?	(Greece) Georgios Papapanagiotou
DF	?	(Greece) Pantelis Rizogiannis	(substituted off) 61'
DF	?	(Greece) Vangelis Stournaras
MF	?	(Greece) Fotis Souleles	(substituted off) 70'
MF	?	(Greece) Dimitrios Makridis	(yellow card) 79'
MF	?	(Greece) Dionysis Giannoulis	(substituted off) 46'
FW	?	(Greece) Nikos Kouskounas (c)
FW	?	(Greece) Filippos Alexandropoulos
Substitutes:
GK	?	(Greece) Christos Paligginis
FW	?	(Poland) Kamil Król
FW	?	(Greece) Stratos Doukakis	(substituted on) 61'
DF	?	(Greece) Theodoros Konstantinidis	(substituted on) 46'
DF	?	(Greece) Dimos Kolovos
DF	?	(Greece) Nikolaos Platanos
MF	?	(Brazil) Wellington Gonçalves	(substituted on) 70'
Manager:
(Greece) Stavros Psimoulakis

AEL:
GK	?	(Greece) Georgios Sikalias
DF	?	(Greece) Christos Mitsis
DF	?	(Greece) Dimitris Roussis	(yellow card) 21'
DF	?	(Greece) Nikos Karanikas
MF	?	(Greece) Georgios Siakkas
MF	?	(Greece) Konstantinos Nebegleras (c)
MF	?	(Greece) Alexandros Tsemperidis
MF	?	(Greece) Thanasis Patiniotis	(substituted off) 71'
MF	?	(Greece) Platon Karakatsanis	(substituted off) 60'
FW	?	(Greece) Nestoras Stefanidis
FW	?	(Greece) Dimitrios Gkourtsas	(substituted off) 88'
Substitutes:
GK	?	(Greece) Anastasios Karakoutsis
DF	?	(Greece) Nikos Arabatzis	(substituted on) 88'
DF	?	(Greece) Nestoras Kotsiopoulos
MF	?	(Greece) Georgios Savvidis	(substituted on) 71'
FW	?	(Greece) Apostolos Garyfallopoulos
MF	?	(Greece) Periklis Bousinakis
MF	?	(Greece) Dimitris Pliagas	(substituted on) 60'
Manager:
(Greece) Panagiotis Tzanavaras

Match officials

- Assistant referees:
  - Georgios Palamidas (Laconia)
  - Dimitrios Vergetis (Arcadia)
- Fourth official: Aristotelis Diamantopoulos (Arcadia)

Match rules

- 90 minutes.
- 30 minutes of extra-time if necessary.
- Penalty shoot-out if scores still level.
- Seven named substitutes.
- Maximum of three substitutions.
