= 2013–14 Gamma Ethniki =

Season of Greek football

Gamma Ethniki
- Season: 2013–14

The 2013–14 Gamma Ethniki was the 31st season since the official establishment of the third tier of Greek football in 1983. It was scheduled to start on 22 September 2013.

93 teams were separated into six groups, according to geographical criteria.

Thrasyvoulos, Anagennisi Epanomi, and Pelopas Kiato F.C. withdrew from the league before the group draw.

== Group 1 ==
=== Teams ===
Location of teams in Group 1 of 2013–14 Football League 2

| Team | Location | Last season |
|---|---|---|
| Evros Soufli | Soufli | D Group 1, 2nd |
| P.A.O.K Kosmio | Kosmio | D Group 1, 6th |
| Aris Akropotamos | Akropotamos | D Group 1, 1st |
| Orfeas Elefteroupoli | Eleftheroupoli | D Group 1, 5th |
| Vyzantio Kokkinochoma | Kokkinochoma | D Group 1, 4th |
| Nestos Chrysoupoli | Chrysoupoli | EPS Kavala champion, promotion play-off Group 1 winner |
| Doxa Petroussa | Petroussa | D Group 1, 3rd |
| Panserraikos | Serres | FL, 8th (relegated to Third Division voluntarily) |
| Ethnikos Sidirokastro | Sidirokastro | North Group, 9th |
| Digenis Lakkoma | Lakkoma | D Group 2, 4th |
| P.O. Moudania | Nea Moudania | EPS Chalcidice champion, promotion play-off Group 3 winner |
| Ethnikos Neo Agioneri | Neo Agioneri | D Group 2, 5th |
| Kilkisiakos | Kilkis | D Group 2, 6th |
| Makedonikos | Neapoli | * |
| Agrotikos Asteras | Evosmos | D Group 2, 3rd |
| Iraklis Ambelokipi | Ampelokipi | D Group 2, 1st |

- note: Makedonikos relegated from 2010–11 Football league 2 season and they were going to play in Fourth division next season, but FIFA and EPO punished them with 2 years exclusion due to debts to a former player. As the exclusion concluded in 2013–2014 season and Fourth Division no longer existed, FIFA and EPO accepted Makedonikos participation in 2013–14 Football league 2 season.

=== Standings ===
| Pos | Team | Pld | W | D | L | GF | GA | GD | Pts | Promotion or relegation |
|---|---|---|---|---|---|---|---|---|---|---|
| 1 | Agrotikos Asteras (C, P) | 30 | 22 | 6 | 2 | 47 | 16 | +31 | 72 | Promotion to Football League |
| 2 | Panserraikos | 30 | 21 | 4 | 5 | 57 | 21 | +36 | 67 | |
| 3 | Aris Akropotamos | 30 | 14 | 8 | 8 | 41 | 35 | +6 | 50 | |
| 4 | Iraklis Ambelokipi | 30 | 14 | 6 | 10 | 39 | 27 | +12 | 48 | |
| 5 | Vyzantio Kokkinochoma | 30 | 12 | 10 | 8 | 25 | 22 | +3 | 46 | |
| 6 | Ethnikos Neo Agioneri | 30 | 13 | 7 | 10 | 31 | 32 | −1 | 46 | |
| 7 | Evros Soufli | 30 | 14 | 3 | 13 | 39 | 35 | +4 | 45 | |
| 8 | Orfeas Elefteroupoli | 30 | 11 | 11 | 8 | 39 | 26 | +13 | 44 | |
| 9 | Kilkisiakos (R) | 30 | 12 | 8 | 10 | 39 | 23 | +16 | 44 | Relegation to FCA championships |
| 10 | Nestos Chrysoupoli (R) | 30 | 12 | 8 | 10 | 51 | 38 | +13 | 44 | Relegation to FCA championships |
| 11 | Digenis Lakkoma (R) | 30 | 11 | 6 | 13 | 57 | 56 | +1 | 39 | Relegation to FCA championships |
| 12 | Doxa Petroussa (R) | 30 | 8 | 10 | 12 | 27 | 32 | −5 | 34 | Relegation to FCA championships |
| 13 | P.O. Moudania (R) | 30 | 9 | 3 | 18 | 37 | 59 | −22 | 30 | Relegation to FCA championships |
| 14 | Ethnikos Sidirokastro (R) | 30 | 8 | 6 | 16 | 31 | 45 | −14 | 30 | Relegation to FCA championships |
| 15 | Makedonikos (R) | 30 | 6 | 7 | 17 | 25 | 48 | −23 | 25 | Relegation to FCA championships |
| 16 | P.A.O.K Kosmio (R) | 30 | 0 | 3 | 27 | 14 | 84 | −70 | 3 | Relegation to FCA championships |

Source: (in Greek)
Rules for classification: 1st points; 2nd head-to-head points; 3rd head-to-head goal difference
(C) Champions; (P) Promoted; (R) Relegated

== Group 2 ==
=== Teams ===
Location of teams in Group 2 of 2013–14 Football League 2

| Team | Location | Last season |
|---|---|---|
| AEL | Larissa | FL, 11th (relegated to Third division voluntarily) |
| Kastoria | Kastoria | EPS Kastoria champion, promotion play-off group 4 winner |
| Kastor | Kastoria | D Group 3, 6th |
| Kozani | Kozani | D Group 3, 1st |
| Keravnos Thesprotiko | Thesprotiko | D Group 5, 6th |
| Ethnikos Filippiada | Filippiada | D Group 5, 3rd |
| ~~Tilikratis~~ | ~~Lefkada~~ | ~~North Group, 11th~~ |
| Preveza | Preveza | EPS Preveza-Lefkada champion, promotion play-off group 8 winner |
| Olympos Kerkyra | Corfu | D Group 5, 2nd |
| Doxa Kranoula | Kranoula | North Group, 10th |
| Pyrsos Grevena | Grevena | D Group 3, 7th |
| Kampaniakos | Chalastra | D Group 2, 2nd |
| Odysseas Kordelio | Kordelio | North Group,8th |
| Doxa Pentalofos | Pentalofos | EPS Macedonia champion, promotion play-off group 2 winner |
| Oikonomos | Tsaritsani | North Group, 12th |
| Thesprotos | Igoumenitsa | EPS Thesprotia champion, promotion play-off group 5 winner |

=== Standings ===
| Pos | Team | Pld | W | D | L | GF | GA | GD | Pts | Promotion or relegation |
|---|---|---|---|---|---|---|---|---|---|---|
| 1 | AEL (C, P) | 30 | 23 | 4 | 3 | 87 | 15 | +72 | 73 | Promotion to Football League |
| 2 | Oikonomos | 30 | 17 | 10 | 3 | 59 | 25 | +34 | 61 | |
| 3 | Kampaniakos | 30 | 16 | 7 | 7 | 50 | 34 | +16 | 55 | |
| 4 | Kozani | 30 | 16 | 6 | 8 | 52 | 32 | +20 | 54 | |
| 5 | Ethnikos Filippiada | 30 | 15 | 7 | 8 | 48 | 24 | +24 | 52 | |
| 6 | Pyrsos Grevena | 30 | 15 | 7 | 8 | 42 | 31 | +11 | 52 | |
| 7 | Thesprotos | 30 | 15 | 6 | 9 | 42 | 27 | +15 | 51 | |
| 8 | Kastoria | 30 | 15 | 6 | 9 | 48 | 38 | +10 | 51 | |
| 9 | Doxa Pentalofos (R) | 30 | 13 | 10 | 7 | 40 | 30 | +10 | 49 | Relegation to FCA championships |
| 10 | Odysseas Kordelio (R) | 30 | 13 | 5 | 12 | 38 | 42 | −4 | 44 | Relegation to FCA championships |
| 11 | Doxa Kranoula (R) | 30 | 9 | 10 | 11 | 43 | 40 | +3 | 37 | Relegation to FCA championships |
| 12 | Preveza (R) | 30 | 9 | 3 | 18 | 42 | 51 | −9 | 30 | Relegation to FCA championships |
| 13 | Kastor (R) | 30 | 6 | 6 | 18 | 30 | 45 | −15 | 24 | Relegation to FCA championships |
| 14 | Keravnos Thesprotiko (R) | 30 | 6 | 5 | 19 | 36 | 67 | −31 | 23 | Relegation to FCA championships |
| 15 | Olympos Kerkyra (R) | 30 | 5 | 2 | 23 | 18 | 84 | −66 | 17 | Relegation to FCA championships |
| 16 | Tilikratis (R) | 30 | 0 | 0 | 30 | 0 | 90 | −90 | −6 (Note: Tilikratis withdraw from the league and were deducted six points for this season and also six points for the 2014–15 season from Hellenic Football Federation.) | Relegation to FCA championships |

Source: (in Greek)
Rules for classification: 1st points; 2nd head-to-head points; 3rd head-to-head goal difference
(C) Champions; (P) Promoted; (R) Relegated

== Group 3 ==
=== Teams ===
Location of teams in Group 3 of 2013–14 Football League 2

| Team | Location | Last season |
|---|---|---|
| Naoussa | Naousa | D Group 3, 2nd |
| Lefkadia | Lefkadia | D Group 3, 4th |
| Makrochori | Makrochori | D Group 3, 3rd |
| A.O. Trikala 1963 | Trikala | D Group 5, 5th |
| A.O Karditsa | Karditsa | D Group 4, 2nd |
| Lamia | Lamia | D Group 4, 1st |
| Achilleas Domokos | Domokos | D Group 4, 4th |
| Achilleas Neokaisareia | Neokaisareia | D Group 3, 5th |
| Rigas Feraios | Velestino | D Group 4, 6th |
| Chalkida | Chalkida | D Group 7, 5th |
| A.O.Kymi | Kymi | EPS Evoia champion, promotion play-off group 7 winner |
| Machitis Terpsithea | Terpsithea | EPS Larissa champion, promotion play-off group 6 winner |
| ~~Pyrgetos~~ | ~~Pyrgetos~~ | ~~D Group 4, 5th~~ |
| Dotieas Agia | Agia | D Group 4, 3rd |
| Ampeloniakos | Ampelonas | D Group 4, 7th |

=== Standings ===
| Pos | Team | Pld | W | D | L | GF | GA | GD | Pts | Promotion or relegation |
|---|---|---|---|---|---|---|---|---|---|---|
| 1 | Lamia (C, P) | 28 | 21 | 3 | 4 | 60 | 25 | +35 | 66 | Promotion to Football League |
| 2 | Achilleas Neokaisareia | 28 | 19 | 5 | 4 | 48 | 20 | +28 | 62 | |
| 3 | A.O.Kymi | 28 | 15 | 8 | 5 | 32 | 17 | +15 | 53 | |
| 4 | Makrochori | 28 | 14 | 4 | 10 | 40 | 33 | +7 | 46 | |
| 5 | Lefkadia | 28 | 12 | 9 | 7 | 30 | 23 | +7 | 45 | |
| 6 | Dotieas Agia | 28 | 11 | 11 | 6 | 41 | 27 | +14 | 44 | |
| 7 | A.O. Trikala 1963 | 28 | 12 | 8 | 8 | 30 | 20 | +10 | 44 | |
| 8 | Rigas Feraios | 28 | 13 | 5 | 10 | 40 | 27 | +13 | 44 | |
| 9 | Machitis Terpsithea (R) | 28 | 10 | 9 | 9 | 42 | 31 | +11 | 39 | Relegation to FCA championships |
| 10 | Naoussa (R) | 28 | 9 | 11 | 8 | 41 | 37 | +4 | 38 | Relegation to FCA championships |
| 11 | Chalkida (R) | 28 | 10 | 7 | 11 | 38 | 33 | +5 | 37 | Relegation to FCA championships |
| 12 | Achilleas Domokos (R) | 28 | 7 | 4 | 17 | 29 | 57 | −28 | 25 | Relegation to FCA championships |
| 13 | A.O Karditsa (R) | 28 | 6 | 5 | 17 | 28 | 44 | −16 | 23 | Relegation to FCA championships |
| 14 | Ampeloniakos (R) | 28 | 4 | 5 | 19 | 28 | 56 | −28 | 17 | Relegation to FCA championships |
| 15 | Pyrgetos (R) | 28 | 0 | 0 | 28 | 6 | 83 | −77 | −6 (Note: Pyrgetos withdrew from the league were deducted six points for this season and also six points for the 2014–15 season from Hellenic Football Federation.) | Relegation to FCA championships |

Source: (in Greek)
Rules for classification: 1st points; 2nd head-to-head points; 3rd head-to-head goal difference
(C) Champions; (P) Promoted; (R) Relegated

== Group 4 ==
=== Teams ===
Location of teams in Group 4 of 2013–14 Football League 2

| Team | Location | Last season |
|---|---|---|
| Kalamata | Kalamata | South Group, 12th |
| Messiniakos | Kalamata | EPS Messenia champion, promotion play-off group 13 winner |
| A.E. Karaiskakis | Arta | D Group 5, 7th |
| Aris Aitoliko | Aitoliko | D Group 5, 4th |
| A.E.Messolonghi | Messolonghi | D Group 5, 1st |
| Atromitos Achaea | Patras | D Group 6, 2nd |
| Achaiki | Kato Achaia | D Group 6, 6th |
| Ethnikos Sageika | Sageika | D Group 6, 3rd |
| PAO Varda | Varda | EPS Elis champion, promotion play-off group 12 winner |
| Asteras Amaliada | Amaliada | EPS Elis runner up(*) |
| Doxa Nea Manolada | Nea Manolada | D Group 6, 5th |
| Panarkadikos | Tripoli | D Group 6, 4th |
| Pannafpliakos | Nafplion | D Group 7, 6th |
| Korinthos | Corinth | South Group, 11th |
| Enosi Ermionida | Kranidi | D Group 7, 1st |
| Panargiakos | Argos | D Group 7, 4th |

- Asteras Amaliada place was originally belonged to P.F.O Panopoulo who finished first in 2012–13 Fourth Division Group 6. However, the two teams were merged in August 2013.

=== Standings ===
| Pos | Team | Pld | W | D | L | GF | GA | GD | Pts | Promotion or relegation |
|---|---|---|---|---|---|---|---|---|---|---|
| 1 | Enosi Ermionida (C, P) | 30 | 23 | 2 | 5 | 55 | 22 | +33 | 71 | Promotion to Football League |
| 2 | Panargiakos | 30 | 19 | 5 | 6 | 47 | 26 | +21 | 62 | |
| 3 | Kalamata | 30 | 20 | 1 | 9 | 52 | 22 | +30 | 61 | |
| 4 | A.E. Karaiskakis | 30 | 18 | 3 | 9 | 41 | 29 | +12 | 57 | |
| 5 | Doxa Nea Manolada | 30 | 15 | 5 | 10 | 38 | 32 | +6 | 50 | |
| 6 | Panarkadikos | 30 | 13 | 9 | 8 | 32 | 23 | +9 | 48 | |
| 7 | Achaiki | 30 | 13 | 7 | 10 | 35 | 27 | +8 | 46 | |
| 8 | PAO Varda | 30 | 12 | 10 | 8 | 28 | 22 | +6 | 46 | |
| 9 | Atromitos Achaea (R) | 30 | 12 | 9 | 9 | 43 | 30 | +13 | 45 | Relegation to FCA championships |
| 10 | Korinthos (R) | 30 | 13 | 5 | 12 | 35 | 26 | +9 | 44 | Relegation to FCA championships |
| 11 | A.E.Messolonghi (R) | 30 | 10 | 10 | 10 | 42 | 37 | +5 | 40 | Relegation to FCA championships |
| 12 | Messiniakos (R) | 30 | 10 | 7 | 13 | 36 | 42 | −6 | 37 | Relegation to FCA championships |
| 13 | Pannafpliakos (R) | 30 | 7 | 3 | 20 | 24 | 46 | −22 | 24 | Relegation to FCA championships |
| 14 | Asteras Amaliada (R) | 30 | 3 | 6 | 21 | 21 | 69 | −48 | 15 | Relegation to FCA championships |
| 15 | Aris Aitoliko (R) | 30 | 2 | 8 | 20 | 21 | 57 | −36 | 14 | Relegation to FCA championships |
| 16 | Ethnikos Sageika (R) | 30 | 3 | 4 | 23 | 18 | 58 | −40 | 13 | Relegation to FCA championships |

Source: (in Greek)
Rules for classification: 1st points; 2nd head-to-head points; 3rd head-to-head goal difference
(C) Champions; (P) Promoted; (R) Relegated

== Group 5 ==
=== Teams ===
Location of teams in Group 5 of 2013–14 Football League 2

| Team | Location | Last season |
|---|---|---|
| Atromitos Piraeus | Piraeus(Kaminia neighborhood) | D Group 9, 2nd |
| Proodeftiki | Nikaia | South Group, 9th |
| Ionikos | Nikaia | D Group 9, 1st |
| Doxa Vyronas | Vyronas | EPS Athens co-champion, promotion play-off Group 9 winner |
| ~~Ethnikos Asteras~~ | ~~Kaisariani~~ | ~~South Group, 13th~~ |
| A.O.Nea Ionia | Nea Ionia | D Group 8, 4th |
| A.O Pefki | Pefki | D Group 8, 5th |
| Trachones | Alimos(Trachones neighborhood) | D Group 8, 6th |
| Atsalenios | Heraklion(Atsalenio neighborhood) | D Group 10, 1st |
| Kissamikos | Kissamos | D Group 10, 6th |
| Rouvas | Gergeri | South Group, 10th |
| Giouchtas | Archanes | D Group 10, 5th |
| A.O. Mykonos | Mykonos | EPS Cyclades champion, promotion play-off Group 10 winner |
| Panelefsiniakos | Eleusina | D Group 7, 3rd |
| ~~Olympiakos Laurium~~ | ~~Laurium~~ | ~~D Group 9, 7th~~ |

=== Standings ===
| Pos | Team | Pld | W | D | L | GF | GA | GD | Pts | Promotion or relegation |
|---|---|---|---|---|---|---|---|---|---|---|
| 1 | Trachones (C, P) | 28 | 19 | 9 | 0 | 59 | 21 | +38 | 66 | Promotion to Football League |
| 2 | Panelefsiniakos | 28 | 20 | 5 | 3 | 49 | 14 | +35 | 65 | |
| 3 | Ionikos | 28 | 15 | 8 | 5 | 41 | 20 | +21 | 53 | |
| 4 | Kissamikos | 28 | 13 | 10 | 5 | 35 | 18 | +17 | 49 | |
| 5 | Atromitos Piraeus | 28 | 13 | 6 | 9 | 42 | 28 | +14 | 45 | |
| 6 | A.O.Nea Ionia | 28 | 12 | 9 | 7 | 38 | 21 | +17 | 45 | |
| 7 | Giouchtas | 28 | 13 | 6 | 9 | 34 | 23 | +11 | 45 | |
| 8 | Atsalenios (R) | 28 | 12 | 7 | 9 | 40 | 25 | +15 | 43 | Relegation to FCA championships |
| 9 | Rouvas (R) | 28 | 11 | 6 | 11 | 36 | 34 | +2 | 39 | Relegation to FCA championships |
| 10 | Doxa Vyronas (R) | 28 | 10 | 9 | 9 | 35 | 26 | +9 | 39 | Relegation to FCA championships |
| 11 | A.O Pefki (R) | 28 | 10 | 8 | 10 | 30 | 25 | +5 | 38 | Relegation to FCA championships |
| 12 | Proodeftiki (R) | 28 | 8 | 4 | 16 | 25 | 45 | −20 | 28 | Relegation to FCA championships |
| 13 | A.O. Mykonos (R) | 28 | 6 | 2 | 20 | 28 | 68 | −40 | 20 | Relegation to FCA championships |
| 14 | Olympiakos Laurium (R) | 27 | 2 | 1 | 24 | 9 | 64 | −55 | 1 (Note: On 29 January 2014 Olympiakos Laurium withdraw the league for the rest of the season and were deducted six points for this season and also six points for the 2014–15 from Hellenic Football Federation.) | Relegation to FCA championships |
| 15 | Ethnikos Asteras (R) | 27 | 0 | 0 | 27 | 3 | 72 | −69 | −6 (Note: On 16 March 2014 Ethnikos Asteras expelled from the league for the rest of the season and were deducted six points for this season and also six points for the 2014–15 from Hellenic Football Federation.) | Relegation to FCA championships |

Source: (in Greek)
Rules for classification: 1st points; 2nd head-to-head points; 3rd head-to-head goal difference
(C) Champions; (P) Promoted; (R) Relegated

== Group 6 ==
=== Teams ===
Location of teams in Group 6 of 2013–14 Football League 2

| Team | Location | Last season |
|---|---|---|
| Peramaikos | Perama | D Group 9, 5th |
| AEK Athens | Athens | SL, 15th (they actually relegated to Football League, they voluntarily relegated one more category lower, to Third Division) |
| Egaleo | Egaleo | D Group 8, 1st |
| Ilisiakos | Zografou | D Group 8, 3rd |
| A.O. Peristeri | Peristeri | D Group 8, 7th |
| A.E. Kifisia | Kifisia | D Group 8, 2nd |
| A.O. Agios Nikolaos | Agios Nikolaos | EPS Lasithi champion, promotion play-off Group 14 winner |
| Ermis Zoniana | Zoniana | D Group 10, 4th |
| Irodotos | Nea Alikarnassos | D Group 10, 3rd |
| P.A.O. Krousonas | Krousonas | D Group 10, 2nd |
| Pannaxiakos | Naxos | D Group 9, 4th |
| Mandraikos | Mandra | D Group 7, 2nd |
| Asteras Vari | Vari | D Group 9, 3rd |
| Thyella Rafina | Rafina(Diastavrosi neighborhood) | EPS Eastern Attica champion, promotion play-off Group 11 winner |
| Triglia Rafina | Rafina | D Group 9, 6th |

=== Standings ===
| Pos | Team | Pld | W | D | L | GF | GA | GD | Pts | Promotion or relegation |
|---|---|---|---|---|---|---|---|---|---|---|
| 1 | AEK Athens (C, P) | 28 | 24 | 3 | 1 | 80 | 14 | +66 | 72 (Note: On 24 January 2014, AEK were deducted three points by Hellenic Football Federation.) | Promotion to Football League |
| 2 | A.E. Kifisia | 28 | 16 | 6 | 6 | 59 | 31 | +28 | 54 | |
| 3 | Irodotos | 28 | 13 | 6 | 9 | 40 | 33 | +7 | 45 | |
| 4 | Triglia Rafina | 28 | 11 | 11 | 6 | 42 | 26 | +16 | 44 | |
| 5 | Asteras Vari | 28 | 12 | 6 | 10 | 39 | 29 | +10 | 42 | |
| 6 | Ilisiakos | 28 | 12 | 6 | 10 | 39 | 42 | −3 | 42 | |
| 7 | P.A.O. Krousonas | 28 | 11 | 7 | 10 | 42 | 48 | −6 | 40 | |
| 8 | Mandraikos | 28 | 9 | 11 | 8 | 31 | 38 | −7 | 38 | |
| 9 | Ermis Zoniana (R) | 28 | 10 | 8 | 10 | 34 | 32 | +2 | 38 | Relegation to FCA championships |
| 10 | Egaleo (R) | 28 | 11 | 6 | 11 | 26 | 25 | +1 | 36 (Note: On 24 January 2014, Egaleo were deducted three points by Hellenic Football Federation.) | Relegation to FCA championships |
| 11 | Thyella Rafina (R) | 28 | 9 | 8 | 11 | 27 | 27 | 0 | 35 | Relegation to FCA championships |
| 12 | A.O. Peristeri (R) | 28 | 8 | 6 | 14 | 33 | 55 | −22 | 30 | Relegation to FCA championships |
| 13 | Peramaikos (R) | 28 | 8 | 4 | 16 | 25 | 48 | −23 | 28 | Relegation to FCA championships |
| 14 | Pannaxiakos (R) | 28 | 3 | 8 | 17 | 22 | 49 | −27 | 17 | Relegation to FCA championships |
| 15 | A.O. Agios Nikolaos (R) | 28 | 3 | 4 | 21 | 24 | 66 | −42 | 13 | Relegation to FCA championships |

Source: (in Greek)
Rules for classification: 1st points; 2nd head-to-head points; 3rd head-to-head goal difference
(C) Champions; (P) Promoted; (R) Relegated
