= Konstantinos Iasonidis =

Greek footballer

Kostas Iasonidis
Personal information
- Full name: Konstantinos Iasonidis
- Date of birth: 1 October 1985 (age 41)
- Place of birth: Oinoi, Kastoria, Greece
- Height: 1.88 m (6 ft 2 in)
- Position: Defender

Team information
- Current team: Panlefkadios

Senior career*
Years	Team	Apps	(Gls)
2002–2006	Panathinaikos	0	(0)
2003–2004	→ Marko (loan)	45	(4)
2005	→ Paniliakos (loan)	5	(0)
2005	→ Proodeftiki (loan)	1	(0)
2006	→ Apollon Smyrnis (loan)	19	(1)
2006–2009	Kastoria	82	(5)
2009	Anagennisi Karditsa	11	(0)
2010	Panthrakikos	15	(0)
2011	Anagennisi Giannitsa	13	(0)
2011–2012	Tilikratis	21	(1)
2012–2013	Apollon Smyrnis	31	(1)
2013	Pierikos	9	(0)
2014–2015	Ermionida	10	(0)
2015–16	Tilikratis	9	(0)
2019–2020	PAS Preveza		
2020–2023	Amvrakikos Vonitsa		
2023–	Panlefkadios		
- * Club domestic league appearances and goals as of 24 August 2025

Kostas Iasonidis (Greek: Κώστας Ιασωνίδης; born 1 October 1985) is a Greek footballer who plays for Panlefkadios.

== Career ==
Born in Oinoi, Kastoria, Iasonidis began playing football with Markopoulo F.C.

Career statistics

season	club	league	Championship		Nation cup		Europe cup		Total	
season	club	league	appear	goals	appear	goals	appear	goals	appear	goals
2003–04	Marko	Gamma Ethniki	32	1	0	0	0	0	32	1
2004	Marko	Gamma Ethniki	13	3	0	0	0	0	13	3
2005	Paniliakos	Beta Ethniki	5	0	0	0	0	0	5	0
2005	Proodeftiki	Beta Ethniki	1	0	0	0	0	0	1	0
2006	Apollon Smyrnis	Gamma Ethniki	19	1	0	0	0	0	19	1
2006–07	Kastoria	Beta Ethniki	29	0	0	0	0	0	29	0
2007–08	Kastoria	Beta Ethniki	32	4	0	0	0	0	32	4
2008–09	Kastoria	Beta Ethniki	21	1	0	0	0	0	21	1
2009	Anagennisi Karditsa	Beta Ethniki	11	0	0	0	0	0	11	0
2010	Panthrakikos	Super League	10	0	0	0	0	0	10	0
2010–11	Panthrakikos	Beta Ethniki	5	0	0	0	0	0	5	0
career total			172	10	0	0	0	0	172	10

Last update: 28 June 2010
