= Dimos Gkaitatzis =

Greek professional footballer

Personal information
- Full name: Dimos Gkaitatzis
- Date of birth: 29 June 1992 (age 34)
- Place of birth: Solingen, Germany
- Height: 1.76 m (5 ft 9 in)
- Positions: Centre-forward; forward

Youth career
- Pandramaikos FC
- Poseidonas Kalamarias
- Axilleas Peraias

Senior career*
| Years | Team | Apps | (Gls) |
| 2009-2010 | Apollon Kalamarias | 12 | (9) |
| 2010-2011 | Makedones FC | 17 | (14) |
| 2011-2012 | Thermaikos F.C. | 14 | (7) |
| 2012-2013 | Doxa Drama F.C. | 8 | (7) |
| 2013-2015 | Prosotsani F.C. | 7 | (6) |

International career
| 2012 | Greece U21 | 1 | (0) |
- * Club domestic league appearances and goals

Dimos Gkaitatzis (Greek: Δήμος Γκαϊτατζής, born 29 June 1992) is a Greek former professional footballer who played as a forward. He has been training for a long time with several teams with which he never came to an agreement. Manager Andrey Shaye sent him after his first steps to Apollon Kalamarias to meet Papadopoulos whom agreed to join the roster of the second team of Doxa Dramas. Gkaitatzis has scored excellent goals in friendly matches which have shown his talent. One of the most important players in his class with speed and versatility.

== Sources ==
1. Sport24.gr
2. New-Soccer Official
3. Us.Soccerway.com
4. Dramagoal.gr
