= Kavala Football Clubs Association =

Association football governing body in Kavala Prefecture, Greece

- Full name: Kavala Football Clubs Association; Greek: Ένωση Ποδοσφαιρικών Σωματείων Καβάλας
- Short name: Kavala F.C.A.; Greek: Ε.Π.Σ. Καβάλας
- Founded: 1930; 96 years ago
- Headquarters: Kavala, Greece
- FIFA affiliation: Hellenic Football Federation
- President: Georgios Prionidis
- Website: epskavalas.gr

Kavala Football Clubs Association (Greek: Ένωση Ποδοσφαιρικών Σωματείων Καβάλας) is the organization that is responsible for football in the Kavala Prefecture in Greece. Its offices are housed in Kavala and it is a member of the HFF. It is responsible for running the local league and cup, as well as the youth and children's divisions. It also coordinates the activities of the mixed youth and children's groups, which represent the county at national level.

== History ==
It was founded in 1930 as the Eastern Macedonia Football Clubs Association (EPSAM), with jurisdiction in the Prefecture of Kavala and the Prefecture of Drama. The founding members of the association were Filippoi Kavala, Doxa Drama, A.E.K. Kavala and Iraklis Kavala, Atlokeravnos Kavala, Pavlos Melas Kavala, and Orfeas Eleftheroupoli.

In 1963, the unions of the Prefecture of Drama, by decision of the HFF seceded from the E.P.S. Eastern Macedonia, creating the Drama Football Clubs Association. At the same time, E.P.S. Eastern Macedonia was renamed as Kavala Football Clubs Association.

== Organization ==
The structure of the leagues of the Kavala FCA for the 2025–26 season were as follows:

- First Division: 14 Teams
- Second Division: 25 Teams
  - Group A: 13 Teams
  - Group B: 12 Teams

=== Champions ===
Season	Champion
Eastern Macedonia Football Clubs Association
1930–31	Filippoi Kavala
1931–32	Filippoi Kavala
1932–33	Not held
1933–34	A.E.K. Kavala
1934–35	Not held
1935–36	
1936–37	Not held
1937–38	Doxa Drama
1938–39	A.E.K. Kavala
1939–40	Filippoi Kavala
1940–41	Not held
1941–42	Not held
1942–43	Not held
1943–44	Not held
1944–45	Not held
1945–46	Not held
1946–47	Not held
1947–48	
1948–49	Doxa Drama
1949–50	
1950–51	Doxa Drama
1951–52	Iraklis Kavala
1952–53	A.E.K. Kavala
1953–54	Doxa Drama
1954–55	Doxa Drama
1955–56	Doxa Drama
1956–57	Doxa Drama
1957–58	Doxa Drama
1958–59	Doxa Drama
1959–60	Iraklis Kavala
1960–61	Filippoi Kavala
1961–62	Iraklis Kavala
1962–63	G.S. Aris Drama
Kavala Football Clubs Association
1963–64	A.E.K. Kavala
1964–65	A.P.S. Vyron Kavala
1965–66	Orfeas Eleftheroupoli
1966–67	
1967–68	Orfeas Eleftheroupoli
1968–69	Orfeas Eleftheroupoli
1969–70	Orfeas Eleftheroupoli
1970–71	Orfeas Eleftheroupoli
1971–72	Nestos Chrysoupoli
1972–73	Nestos Chrysoupoli
1973–74	Orfeas Eleftheroupoli
1974–75	Orfeas Eleftheroupoli
1975–76	Nestos Chrysoupoli
1976–77	Orfeas Eleftheroupoli
1977–78	A.P.S. Neapoli Kavala
1978–79	G.A.S. Iraklis Potamoudia Kavala
1979–80	
1980–81	Orfeas Eleftheroupoli
1981–82	Nestos Chrysoupoli
1982–83	A.E.K. Kavala
1983–84	Keravnos Krinides
1984–85	Vyzantio Kokkinochoma
1985–86	Orfeas Eleftheroupoli
1986–87	Megas Alexandros Orfani
1987–88	Megas Alexandros Orfani
1988–89	G.A.S. Iraklis Potamoudia Kavala (Note: Play-off match: Iraklis Kavala - Megas Alexandros Orfani 1–0)
1989–90	OFI Nea Iraklitsa (Note: Play-off match: OFI Nea Iraklitsa - Asteras Georgiani 2–1)
1990–91	Aris Zygos
1991–92	Orfeas Eleftheroupoli
1992–93	Vrasidas Nea Peramos
1993–94	G.A.S. Iraklis Potamoudia Kavala
1994–95	Orfeas Eleftheroupoli
1995–96	Megas Alexandros Orfani
1996–97	Vrasidas Nea Peramos
1997–98	Orfeas Eleftheroupoli
1998–99	G.P.S. Doxa Amygdaleonas
1999–2000	Vyzantio Kokkinochoma
2000–01	Orfeas Eleftheroupoli
2001–02	Nestos Chrysoupoli
2002–03	Theagenis Thasos
2003–04	G.A.S. Iraklis Potamoudia Kavala
2004–05	Nestos Chrysoupoli
2005–06	Keravnos Krinides
2006–07	Orfeas Eleftheroupoli
2007–08	A.E. Pierea 2004
2008–09	Vrasidas Nea Peramos
2009–10	Nestos Chrysoupoli
2010–11	Aris Akropotamos
2011–12	Vyzantio Kokkinochoma
2012–13	Nestos Chrysoupoli
2013–14	Keravnos Perni
2014–15	Nestos Chrysoupoli
2015–16	G.A.S. Iraklis Potamoudia Kavala
2016–17	Aetos Ofrynio
2017–18	Keravnos Perni
2018–19	Doxa Theologos-Poto Thasos
2019–20	Megas Alexandros Orfani
2020–21	Suspended
2021–22	A.P.S. Vyron Kavala
2022–23	Orfeas Eleftheroupoli
2023–24	Aris Piges
2024–25	Aetos Ofrynio
2025–26	Orfeas Eleftheroupoli

== Cup ==
Season	Winner
1971–72	A.P.S. Vyron Kavala
1972–73	Nestos Chrysoupoli
1973–74	Kavala amateurs
1974–75	A.P.S. Neapoli Kavala
1975–76	Nestos Chrysoupoli
1976–77	Orfeas Eleftheroupoli
1977–78	Orfeas Eleftheroupoli
1978–79	Nestos Chrysoupoli
1979–80	A.P.S. Vyron Kavala
1980–81	A.E.K. Kavala
1981–82	A.E.K. Kavala
1982–83	Orfeas Eleftheroupoli
1983–84	G.A.S. Iraklis Potamoudia Kavala
1984–85	A.E.K. Kavala
1985–86	Keravnos Krinides
1986–87	Megas Alexandros Orfani
1987–88	Megas Alexandros Orfani
1988–89	G.A.S. Iraklis Potamoudia Kavala
1989–90	Nestos Chrysoupoli
1990–91	Asteras Georgiani
1991–92	G.A.S. Iraklis Potamoudia Kavala
1992–93	Orfeas Eleftheroupoli
1993–94	Megas Alexandros Orfani
1994–95	Orfeas Eleftheroupoli
1995–96	Nestos Chrysoupoli
1996–97	Orfeas Eleftheroupoli
1997–98	Nestos Chrysoupoli
1998–99	Nestos Chrysoupoli
1999–2000	Nestos Chrysoupoli
2000–01	Orfeas Eleftheroupoli
2001–02	Nestos Chrysoupoli
2002–03	Orfeas Eleftheroupoli
2003–04	Orfeas Eleftheroupoli
2004–05	Theagenis Thasos
2005–06	Aris Zygos
2006–07	G.A.S. Iraklis Potamoudia Kavala
2007–08	Keravnos Krinides
2008–09	Vrasidas Nea Peramos
2009–10	A.E. Pierea 2004
2010–11	Aris Akropotamos
2011–12	Orfeas Eleftheroupoli
2012–13	Aris Akropotamos
2013–14	Aetos Ofrynio
2014–15	Nestos Chrysoupoli
2015–16	Nestos Chrysoupoli
2016–17	Keravnos Perni
2017–18	Kavala
2018–19	Aetos Ofrynio
2019–20	Nestos Chrysoupoli
2020–21	Suspended due to COVID-19 pandemic
2021–22	A.P.S. Vyron Kavala
2022–23	A.P.S. Vyron Kavala
2023–24	Kavala
2024–25	Aris Piges
2025–26	A.P.S. Vyron Kavala

=== Finals ===
Season	Winner	Result	Runner-up
1971–72	A.P.S. Vyron Kavala		
1972–73	Nestos Chrysoupoli		
1973–74	Kavala amateurs		
1974–75	A.P.S. Neapoli Kavala		
1975–76	Nestos Chrysoupoli		
1976–77	Orfeas Eleftheroupoli		
1977–78	Orfeas Eleftheroupoli		
1978–79	Nestos Chrysoupoli		
1979–80	A.P.S. Vyron Kavala	1–0	Nestos Chrysoupoli
1980–81	A.E.K. Kavala	1–0 (a.e.t.)	Keravnos Krinides
1981–82	A.E.K. Kavala	1–0	Keravnos Krinides
1982–83	Orfeas Eleftheroupoli	3–1 (a.e.t.)	Anagennisi Chrysoupoli
1983–84	G.A.S. Iraklis Potamoudia Kavala	2–0	Keravnos Krinides
1984–85	A.E.K. Kavala	4–1	Theagenis Thasos
1985–86	Keravnos Krinides	3–1	Theagenis Thasos
1986–87	Megas Alexandros Orfani	1–0	Keravnos Krinides
1987–88	Megas Alexandros Orfani	1–0	Doxa Lydia
1988–89	G.A.S. Iraklis Potamoudia Kavala	0–0 (3–1 p)	Megas Alexandros Orfani
1989–90	Nestos Chrysoupoli	1–0	OFI Nea Iraklitsa
1990–91	Asteras Georgiani	1–0	Nestos Chrysoupoli
1991–92	G.A.S. Iraklis Potamoudia Kavala	1–0	Vrasidas Nea Peramos
1992–93	Orfeas Eleftheroupoli	1–0	Nestos Chrysoupoli
1993–94	Megas Alexandros Orfani	4–3 (a.e.t.)	Aetos Eratino
1994–95	Orfeas Eleftheroupoli	2–1	G.A.S. Iraklis Potamoudia Kavala
1995–96	Nestos Chrysoupoli	5–1	Keravnos Krinides
1996–97	Orfeas Eleftheroupoli	1–0	Megas Alexandros Orfani
1997–98	Nestos Chrysoupoli	4–2	G.A.S. Iraklis Potamoudia Kavala
1998–99	Nestos Chrysoupoli	1–0	Doxa Amygdaleonas
1999–2000	Nestos Chrysoupoli	3–1 (a.e.t.)	Keravnos Krinides
2000–01	Orfeas Eleftheroupoli	3–0	G.A.S. Iraklis Potamoudia Kavala
2001–02	Nestos Chrysoupoli	3–2	Orfeas Eleftheroupoli
2002–03	Orfeas Eleftheroupoli	3–0	Nestos Chrysoupoli
2003–04	Orfeas Eleftheroupoli	3–2 (a.e.t.)	Aris Kechrokampos
2004–05	Theagenis Thasos	3–2	Nestos Chrysoupoli
2005–06	Aris Zygos	1–0	G.A.S. Iraklis Potamoudia Kavala
2006–07	G.A.S. Iraklis Potamoudia Kavala	2–0	Orfeas Eleftheroupoli
2007–08	Keravnos Krinides	1–0	Nestos Chrysoupoli
2008–09	Vrasidas Nea Peramos	1–1 (3–2 p)	A.E. Pierea 2004
2009–10	A.E. Pierea 2004	1–0	Vrasidas Nea Peramos
2010–11	Aris Akropotamos	2–0	A.E. Pierea 2004
2011–12	Orfeas Eleftheroupoli	2–1	Aris Akropotamos
2012–13	Aris Akropotamos	1–0	A.P.S. Vyron Kavala
2013–14	Aetos Ofrynio	2–1	Nazianzos Nea Karvali
2014–15	Nestos Chrysoupoli	5–0	A.E.K. Kavala
2015–16	Nestos Chrysoupoli	3–2 (a.e.t.)	G.A.S. Iraklis Potamoudia Kavala
2016–17	Keravnos Perni	0–0 (5–4 p)	Aetos Ofrynio
2017–18	Kavala	3–1	A.P.S. Vyron Kavala
2018–19	Aetos Ofrynio	1–0	Anagennisi Limenaria Thasos
2019–20	Nestos Chrysoupoli	After draw	A.P.S. Vyron Kavala
2020–21	Suspended due to COVID-19 pandemic		
2021–22	A.P.S. Vyron Kavala	1–0	Doxa Theologos-Poto Thasos
2022–23	A.P.S. Vyron Kavala	1–0	Aris Piges
2023–24	Kavala	1–0	A.P.S. Vyron Kavala
2024–25	Aris Piges	1–0 (a.e.t.)	A.O. Keramoti
2025–26	A.P.S. Vyron Kavala	3–2 (a.e.t.)	Vyzantio Kokkinochoma

=== Winners by club ===
Club	Winner	Seasons
Nestos Chrysoupoli	12	1973, 1976, 1979, 1990, 1996, 1998, 1999, 2000, 2002, 2015, 2016, 2020
Orfeas Eleftheroupoli	10	1977, 1978, 1983, 1993, 1995, 1997, 2001, 2003, 2004, 2012
A.P.S. Vyron Kavala	5	1972, 1980, 2022, 2023, 2026
G.A.S. Iraklis Potamoudia Kavala	4	1984, 1989, 1992, 2007
A.E.K. Kavala	3	1981, 1982, 1985
Megas Alexandros Orfani	3	1987, 1988, 1994
Keravnos Krinides	2	1986, 2008
Aris Akropotamos	2	2011, 2013
Aetos Ofrynio	2	2014, 2019
Kavala	2	2018, 2024
Kavala amateurs	1	1974
A.P.S. Neapoli Kavala	1	1975
Asteras Georgiani	1	1991
Theagenis Thasos	1	2005
Aris Zygos	1	2006
Vrasidas Nea Peramos	1	2009
A.E. Pierea 2004	1	2010
Keravnos Perni	1	2017
Aris Piges	1	2025

== Super Cup ==
=== Finals ===
Season	Winner	Result	Runner-up
2018	Kavala	2–0	Keravnos Perni
2019	Aetos Orfano	1–0	Doxa Theologos-Poto Thasos
2020	Nestos Chrysoupoli	2–0	Megas Alexandros Orfani
2023	Vyron Kavala	2–1	Orfeas Eleftheroupoli
2024	Kavala	5–0	Aris Piges
2025	Aris Piges	0–0 (5–4 p)	Aetos Ofrynio
2026	Orfeas Eleftheroupoli	4–0	Vyron Kavala
