= 2013–14 Football League 2 =

2013–14 Football League 2 may refer to:

- 2013–14 Gamma Ethniki, Greek football season of a league previously named "Football League 2"
- 2013–14 Football League Two, English football season
