= Lefteris Topalidis =

Greek footballer (born 1986)

Personal information
- Full name: Eleftherios Topalidis
- Date of birth: 2 September 1986 (age 40)
- Place of birth: Kavala, Greece
- Height: 1.86 m (6 ft 1 in)
- Position: Goalkeeper

Senior career*
Years	Team	Apps	(Gls)
2005–2006	Orfeas Eleftheroupoli		
2006–2008	PAONE	18	(0)
2008–2011	Doxa Drama	61	(0)
2011–2012	Zakynthos	3	(0)
2012	Chalkida		
2012–2013	Anagennisi Epanomi	10	(0)
2013–	Panserraikos	24	(0)
- * Club domestic league appearances and goals as of 17:53, 11 August 2012 (UTC)

Eleftherios "Lefteris" Topalidis (Greek: Λευτέρης Τοπαλίδης, born 2 September 1986) is a Greek footballer who currently plays as a goalkeeper for Anagennisi Epanomi in the Football League. During his career, he has also played for Orfeas Eleftheroupoli, PAONE, Doxa Drama, Zakynthos and Chalkida.

== Club career ==
Born in Kavala, Topalidis began playing football in the regional leagues with local club Orfeas Eleftheroupoli and joined Gamma Ethniki side PAONE in 2006. After two seasons with PAONE, he signed with Doxa Drama for three seasons, celebrating two promotions with the club – he helped the club reach the 2010–11 Football League promotion play-offs, where they lost to OFI, but Doxa Drama managed to get promoted to the Super League after all due to the Koriopolis scandal. Topalidis however did not stay at Drama and moved to Greek Football League 2 side Zakynthos for half a year and in February 2012 he signed for Chalkida in the Delta Ethniki. In July 2012 he joined Anagennisi Epanomi in the Greek Football League.
