= Panagriniakos F.C. =

Panagriniakos
- Full name: Panagriniakos Athlitikos Omilos
- Founded: 1982; 44 years ago
- Ground: Agios Konstantinos Municipal Stadium, Agrinio
- Chairman: Giorgos Kazantzis
- Manager: Vasilis Pastromas
- League: Gamma Ethniki
- 2025–26: Aetoloacarnania FCA First Division, 1st (promoted)
Home colours

Panagriniakos Athletic Club (Greek: Παναγρινιακός Αθλητικός Όμιλος), commonly known as Panagriniakos, is a Greek football club based in Agrinio, Aetoloacarnania. Founded in 1982, the club's official colors are blue and yellow.

== History ==
Founded in 1982 as Panathinaikos Agrinio (Greek: Παναθηναϊκός Αγρινίου), the club initially competed in the local championships of the Aetoloacarnania Football Clubs Association. In the summer of 2019, the club's board approved a name change to Panagriniakos and adopted yellow and blue as the official team colors. The renaming was intended to appeal to the broader local community of Agrinio and support the team's pursuit of competing in national divisions.

In 2020, the club earned promotion to Gamma Ethniki, where it competed until being relegated in the 2022–23 season.

In 2023, the club won the Aetoloacarnania Cup for the first time in its history, defeating Aris Aitoliko 2–0 in the final held in Nafpaktos.

In the 2023–24 season, Panagriniakos won the Aetoloacarnania FCA championship and qualified for the Greek FCA Winners' Championship, where it secured a return to national divisions after one year. However, due to administrative and financial difficulties, the club declined promotion and opted to remain in the A' Division of the local FCA.

In the 2025–26 season, the club won the Aetoloacarnania FCA championship for the second time and earned promotion back to Gamma Ethniki after a three-year absence.

== Partnerships ==
Ahead of the 2026–27 season, Panagriniakos announced an official partnership with Panetolikos, the primary professional club of Agrinio. The agreement focuses on player development, allowing young Panetolikos players to gain competitive experience by competing with Panagriniakos in Gamma Ethniki.

== Honours ==
=== Regional ===
- Aetoloacarnania FCA First Division
  - Winners (2): 2023–24, 2025–26
- Aetoloacarnania FCA Cup
  - Winners (4): 2022–23, 2023–24, 2024–25, 2025–26
