= Ilias Sapanis =

Greek footballer

Personal information
- Full name: Ilias Sapanis
- Date of birth: 29 December 1973 (age 52)
- Place of birth: Pentalofos, Thessaloniki
- Height: 1.84 m (6 ft 1/2 in)
- Position: Forward

Senior career*
| Years | Team | Apps | (Gls) |
| 1988–1991 | Doxa Pentalofos | 64 | (23) |
| 1991–1992 | Alexandreia | 27 | (12) |
| 1992–1994 | Naoussa | 75 | (18) |
| 1994–1996 | Olympiacos | 29 | (4) |
| 1996–2000 | Iraklis | 75 | (18) |
| 2000–2001 | PAS Giannina | 16 | (3) |
| 2001–2003 | Lanciano | 70 | (12) |
| 2003–2004 | U.S.D. Palmese | 16 | (3) |
| 2004–2006 | Cuoio Pelli | 6 | (1) |
| 2006–2007 | Koropi | 3 | (0) |
| 2007–2008 | Agios Dimitrios | | (?) |
| 2008–2009 | Diagoras | | (?) |
| 2009–2011 | Doxa Pentalofos | | |
- * Club domestic league appearances and goals as of 20 April 2017

Ilias Sapanis (Greek: Ηλίας Σαπάνης; born 29 December 1973) is a Greek retired footballer.

== Career ==
Sapanis started his career from Naoussa F.C. in 1992. His brilliant performances transferred him to Olympiacos After 2.5 years, he moved to Iraklis, along with Takis Gonias as exchange for Georgios Anatolakis transfer. Sapanis scored two goals for Olympiacos at UEFA Cup. The first was against Sevilla in a home 2-1 victory, and the second against Ferencváros in a 2-2 tie. Sapanis also played in Italy, with three teams. Sapanis played until age 38 with his birthplace club Doxa Pentalofos. His brother Miltiadis Sapanis is also footballer.
