= Georgios Kokkinis =

Greek footballer

Personal information
- Full name: Georgios Kokkinis
- Date of birth: 27 April 1989 (age 37)
- Place of birth: Achaea, Greece
- Height: 1.83 m (6 ft 0 in)
- Positions: Central defender; left back

Team information
- Current team: Dotieas Agia F.C.
- Number: 5

Senior career*
Years	Team	Apps	(Gls)
2007–2008	Egaleo F.C.	24	(0)
2008–2009	Ilisiakos F.C.	19	(0)
2009–2010	Egaleo F.C.	25	(0)
2010–2011	Ethnikos Piraeus F.C.	26	(0)
2011–2013	Panachaiki	46	(0)
2014–2014	Panelefsiniakos F.C.	17	(1)
2014– 2015	Dotieas Agia F.C.	26	(2)
2015–	Ialysos F.C.		
- * Club domestic league appearances and goals

Georgios Kokkinis (Greek: Γεώργιος Κοκκίνης; born 27 April 1989) is a Greek footballer. He currently plays for Ialysos F.C.. He plays as central defender and can also play as left back.

== Club career ==
Born in Krinos, Achaea, Kokkinis began his football career with local side Krinos F.C. and Atromitos Achaea F.C. at the age of 11. Six years later, in 2007, he signed his first professional contract at Egaleo F.C. In the summer of 2008, Kokkinis transferred to Ilisiakos F.C. A year later, he returned to Egaleo F.C., where he stayed for one year. In 2010, he signed with Ethnikos Piraeus F.C.; a year later, in 2011, Kokkinis signed with Panachaiki. He stayed there for two and a half years. On 10 January 2014, he signed with Panelefsiniakos F.C. for half a year. In the summer of 2014 Dotieas Agia F.C. announced the agreement with the player for one year and on 26 April Kokkinis scored twice for Dotieas Agia F.C. After a successful year in dotieas, Kokkinis moved to Rhodes on 27 July 2015 and signed a one-year contract with Football League 2 side Ialysos F.C. for the 2015–2016 season.
