= Miltiadis Sapanis =

Greek footballer

Personal information
- Full name: Miltiadis Sapanis
- Date of birth: 28 January 1976 (age 50)
- Place of birth: Pentalofos, Thessaloniki, Greece
- Height: 1.81 m (5 ft 11 1/2 in)
- Position: Midfielder

Senior career*
Years	Team	Apps	(Gls)
1994–1997	Naoussa	81	(3)
1997–2001	Paniliakos	74	(14)
2001–2005	Panathinaikos	42	(8)
2005–2007	AEK Athens	12	(0)
2007–2008	APOEL	11	(1)
2008	Ionikos	12	(3)
2008–2009	Kavala	29	(6)
2009–2010	Thrasyvoulos	29	(2)
2010–2012	Agrotikos Asteras	29	(5)
2012	Iraklis	14	(4)
2012–2019	Doxa Pentalofos		

International career
2004	Greece Olympic (O.P.)	3	(0)
- * Club domestic league appearances and goals

Miltiadis Sapanis (Greek: Μιλτιάδης Σαπάνης; born 28 January 1976) is a Greek former professional footballer who played as a midfielder.

== Club career ==
Sapanis started his career in 1994 at Naoussa. In 1997 he moved to Paniliakos, where he played for four years. Afterwards, he signed for Panathinaikos. There he won the domestic double in 2004. On 1 June 2005 after his contract was expired Sapanis joined the city rivals, AEK Athens, where he failed to established himself in the squad.

On 10 January 2007 he was transferred to the Cypriot side, APOEL. where he helped the team to win the 2006–07 Cypriot First Division. Then he returned to Greece and played for Ionikos and Kavala, before moving to Agrotikos Asteras. In 2012 he moved to Iraklis for a brief spell and then to Doxa Pentalofos, where he retired in 2019.

== International career ==
Sapanis played for Greece at the 2004 Olympic Games.

== Personal life ==
His brother Ilias is also a former footballer, who played in Greece and Italy.

== Honours ==
Panathinaikos

- Alpha Ethniki: 2003–04
- Greek Cup: 2003–04

APOEL

- Cypriot First Division: 2006–07
