= Klajdi Toska =

Albanian footballer

Personal information
- Date of birth: 4 May 1994 (age 32)
- Place of birth: Berat, Albania
- Position: Midfielder

Team information
- Current team: PAS Preveza

Youth career
- –2013: Panetolikos

Senior career*
Years	Team	Apps	(Gls)
2014–2015	Telos Agras		(0)
2015–2016	Apollon Thermo		(0)
2016	Laçi	11	(0)
2017	Thiva		
2017–2018	Neos Amfilochos		
2018–2024	Tilikratis		
2024–2025	Amvrakikos Vonitsa		
2025–	PAS Preveza		
- * Club domestic league appearances and goals as of 8 December 2016

Klajdi Toska (born 4 May 1994) is an Albanian professional footballer who plays as a midfielder for Greek club PAS Preveza.

== Career ==
Toska spent a few months with Laçi in the Albanian Superliga.
