= Dimosthenis Magginas =

Greek runner

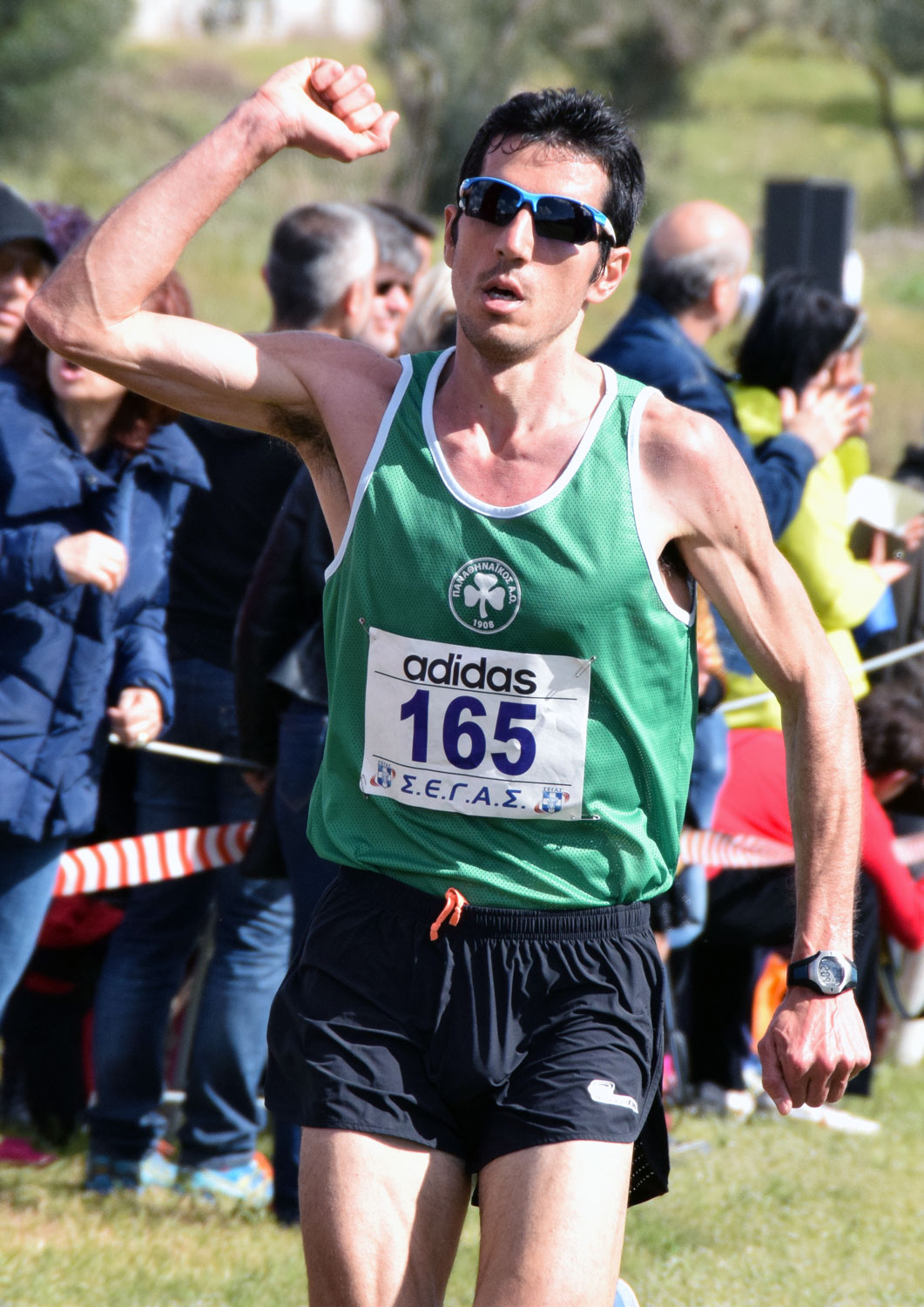
- Dimos competing at the European Team Championships

Personal information
- Nationality: Greek
- Born: June 28, 1982 (age 44) Komotini, Rhodope, Greece
- Height: 188 cm (6 ft 2 in)
- Weight: 67 kg (148 lb)

Sport
- Country: Greece
- Sport: Middle-distance running, Long-distance running
- Event(s): 800 metres, 1500 metres, 3000 metres, 5000 metres, 10,000 metres, half marathon, marathon
- Club: A.O. Mykonos

Achievements and titles
- Personal bests: 800μ: 1:54.46; 800μ κλ.: 1:55.32; 1500 metres: 3:49.06; 1500 metres ind.: 3:49.47; 3000 metres: 8:09.50; 3000 metres ind.: 8:15.55; 5000 metres: 14:20.1; 10000 metres: 30:10.51; 10000 metres Cross Country: 30:31; Half Marathon: 1:07:10; Marathon: 2:28:58
- Updated on 25 February 2021

Dimosthenis -or Dimos- Magginas is a Greek middle-distance and long-distance runner. He was born on the 25th of June 1982 in Komotini and resides in Athens. Since December 2016 he competes for A.O. Mykonos.

He is a 3 times Panhellenic champion in 5000 metres, 7 times Panhellenic champion in 10000metres and has won 5 times the first place for the 10000 meters cross country individual competition.
