= PAS Acheron Kanallaki F.C. =

PAS Acheron Kanallaki
- Full name: Podosfairikos Athlitikos Syllogos Acheron Kanallaki
- Founded: 1971; 55 years ago
- Ground: Municipal Stadium; Kanallaki, Preveza, Greece
- Chairman: Athanasios Tzimas
- Manager: Michalis Bolos
- League: Preveza-Lefkada FCA First Division
- 2025–26: Preveza-Lefkada FCA First Division, 2nd
Home colours

PAS Acheron Kanallaki Football Club (Greek: Π.Α.Σ. Αχέρων Καναλακίου) is a Greek football club based in Kanallaki, Preveza.

The club was founded in 1971. They promoted to Gamma Ethniki for the first time in 1994-95.

== Current squad ==
As of 5 December 2021

Note: Flags indicate national team as defined under FIFA eligibility rules; some limited exceptions apply. Players may hold more than one non-FIFA nationality.

No.	Pos.	Nation	Player
—	GK	GRE	Vlachos Aristidis
—	DF	GRE	Kapias Stefanos
—	DF	GRE	Konstantinou Vangelis
—	DF	GRE	Theodorakis Dimitrios
—	DF	GRE	Vasiliadis Anastasios
—	DF	GRE	Fragos Spyros
—	MF	GRE	Datidis German
—	MF	GRE	Emvraizoglou Nikolaos
—	MF	GRE	Vangelis Anastasiou
—	MF	GRE	Georgiou Fotis
—	MF	GRE	Kostamenas Giorgos
—	MF	GRE	Potsis Thomas
—	MF	GRE	Tsoutsis Alexandros

No.	Pos.	Nation	Player
—	FW	GRE	Zdravos-Rizos Konstantinos
—	FW	GRE	Kyriakis Dimitrios
—	FW	GRE	Papanikou Nikos
—	FW	GRE	Verbis Dimitrios

== Honours ==
=== Domestic ===
League

- Fourth Division
  - Winners (2): 1993–94, 2020–21
- Preveza-Lefkada FCA First Division
  - Winners (8): 1983–84, 1990–91, 1998–99, 2005–06, 2013–14, 2014–15, 2024–25

Cup

- Preveza-Lefkada FCA Cup
  - Winners (2): 1982–83, 1993–94
- Preveza-Lefkada FCA Super Cup
  - Winners (2): 2014, 2015
