= A.E. Kalampaki F.C. =

Greek football club

Athlitiki Enosi Kalampaki
- Founded: 1947; 79 years ago
- Ground: Kalampaki Municipal Stadium
- Capacity: 600
- Chairman: Stefanos Keletsoglou
- Manager: Vasilios Sarakasidis
- League: Drama FCA First Division
- 2025–26: Drama FCA First Division, 5th
Home colours	Away colours

A.E. Kalampaki F.C. is a Greek football club, based in Kalampaki, Drama, Greece.

== Honors ==
=== Domestic Titles and honors ===
  - Drama FCA champion: 6
    - 1974–75, 1978–79, 1993–94, 2004–05, 2008–09, 2017–18
  - Drama FCA Cup Winners : 4
    - 1992–93, 2008–09, 2017–18, 2021–22
