= Megas Alexandros Xiropotamos F.C. =

Megas Alexandros Xiropotamos
- Full name: Megas Alexandros Xiropotamos
- Founded: 1952
- Ground: Xiropotamos Municipal Stadium
- Chairman: Doukas Routsis
- Manager: Tasos Lefkopoulos
- League: Drama FCA First Division
- 2025–26: Drama FCA First Division, 6th

Megas Alexandros Xiropotamos F.C. is a Greek football club, based in Xiropotamos, Drama, Greece.

== Honors ==
=== Domestic Titles and honors ===
  - Drama FCA Champions: 1
    - 2016–17
  - Drama FCA Cup Winners: 1
    - 1977-78
