= Dimitrios Gianniotis =

Greek footballer

Personal information
- Date of birth: 28 January 1999 (age 27)
- Place of birth: Agrinio, Greece
- Height: 1.93 m (6 ft 4 in)
- Position: Centre-back

Team information
- Current team: Tilikratis
- Number: 16

Youth career
- 2015–2018: Panetolikos

Senior career*
Years	Team	Apps	(Gls)
2018–2021	Panetolikos	0	(0)
2019–2021	→ Karaiskakis (loan)	14	(1)
2021	Episkopi	5	(0)
2021–	Karaiskakis	15	(0)
- * Club domestic league appearances and goals as of 17 April 2022

Dimitrios Gianniotis (Greek: Δημήτριος Γιαννιώτης; born 28 January 1999) is a Greek professional footballer who plays as a centre-back for Super League 2 club Tilikratis.
