= Preveza-Lefkada Football Clubs Association =

Association football governing body in Greece

- Full name: Preveza–Lefkada Football Clubs Association; Greek: Ένωση Ποδοσφαιρικών Σωματείων Πρέβεζας–Λευκάδας
- Short name: Preveza–Lefkada F.C.A.; Greek: Ε.Π.Σ. Πρέβεζας–Λευκάδας
- Founded: 1981; 45 years ago
- Headquarters: Preveza, Greece
- FIFA affiliation: Hellenic Football Federation
- President: Thomas Kartsaklas
- Website: epsprevezas-lefkadas.gr

Preveza–Lefkada Football Clubs Association (Greek: Ένωση Ποδοσφαιρικών Σωματείων Πρέβεζας–Λευκάδας) is an association responsible for administering football in Preveza Prefecture, Lefkada Prefecture and part of Aetolia-Acarnania (Vonitsa). It is based in the city of Preveza and is a member of Hellenic Football Federation.

It was founded in 1981 after breaking up from the Epirus Football Clubs Association.

== Organization ==
The association is a member of the Hellenic Football Federation and organizes a regional football league and cup.

== League ==
Season	Club
1981–82	Ethnikos Filippiada
1982–83	Tilikratis Lefkada
1983–84	PAS Acheron Kanallaki
1984–85	Keravnos Thesprotiko
1985–86	PAS Amvrakikos Vonitsa
1986–87	AE Preveza
1987–88	Tilikratis Lefkada
1988–89	Ethnikos Filippiada
1989–90	Apollon Parga
1990–91	PAS Acheron Kanallaki
1991–92	PAS Amvrakikos Vonitsa
1992–93	Ethnikos Filippiada
1993–94	Odisseas Nydri
1994–95	PAS Preveza
1995–96	Odisseas Nydri
1996–97	Tilikratis Lefkada
1997–98	Ethnikos Filippiada
1998–99	PAS Acheron Kanallaki
1999–00	Apollon Parga
2000–01	PAS Amvrakikos Vonitsa
2001–02	PAS Amvrakikos Vonitsa
2002–03	Ethnikos Filippiada
2003–04	PAS Amvrakikos Vonitsa
2004–05	Tilikratis Lefkada
2005–06	PAS Acheron Kanallaki
2006–07	PAS Amvrakikos Vonitsa
2007–08	Thriamvos Louros
2008–09	Odisseas Nydri
2009–10	Thriamvos Louros
2010–11	AO Mesopotamos
2011–12	Keravnos Thesprotiko
2012–13	Agios Thomas Preveza
2013–14	PAS Acheron Kanallaki
2014–15	PAS Acheron Kanallaki
2015–16	Tilikratis Lefkada
2016–17	Panlefkadios
2017–18	PAS Acheron Kanallaki
2018–19	PAS Preveza
2019–20	PAS Thyella 2015
2020–21	Abandoned
2021–22	Apollon Parga
2022–23	Thriamvos Louros
2023–24	PAS Amvrakikos Vonitsa
2024–25	PAS Acheron Kanallaki
2025–26	PAS Preveza

=== Performance by Club ===
Club	Titles	Season
PAS Acheron Kanallaki	8	1984, 1991, 1999, 2006, 2014, 2015, 2018, 2025
PAS Amvrakikos Vonitsa	7	1986, 1992, 2001, 2002, 2004, 2007, 2024
Ethnikos Filippiada	5	1982, 1989, 1993, 1998, 2003
Tilikratis Lefkada	5	1983, 1988, 1997, 2005, 2016
PAS Preveza	4	1995, 2013, 2019, 2026
Odisseas Nydri	3	1994, 1996, 2009
Apollon Parga	3	1990, 2000, 2022
Thriamvos Louros	3	2008, 2010, 2023
Keravnos Thesprotiko	2	1985, 2012
AE Preveza	1	1987
AO Mesopotamos	1	2011
Panlefkadios	1	2017
PAS Thyella 2015	1	2020

== Cup ==
The Preveza-Lefkada FCA Cup is a football competition in which the clubs competing in any of the Preveza-Lefkada FCA Football Leagues participate.

=== List of Preveza-Lefkada FCA Cup Finals ===
Season	Club	Score	Club
1981–82	PAS Preveza	7–3	AO Mesopotamos
1982–83	PAS Acheron Kanallaki	2–0	Apollon Parga
1983–84	Ethnikos Filippiada	3–1	Keravnos Thesprotiko
1984–85	Keravnos Thesprotiko	1–0	Ethnikos Filippiada
1985–86	PAS Preveza	2–1	PAS Amvrakikos Vonitsa
1986–87	PAS Amvrakikos Vonitsa	3–3 (8–7 pen)	Ethnikos Filippiada
1987–88	Tilikratis Lefkada	4–0	Keravnos Thesprotiko
1988–89	PAS Preveza	0–0 (8–7 pen)	Tilikratis Lefkada
1989–90	Tilikratis Lefkada	1–0 (et)	AE Preveza
1990–91	PAS Amvrakikos Vonitsa	4–1	PAS Acheron Kanallaki
1991–92	Ethnikos Filippiada	2–0	AE Preveza
1992–93	PAS Preveza	1–0	Odisseas Nydri
1993–94	PAS Acheron Kanallaki	2–1	AE Preveza
1994–95	Odisseas Nydri	3–1	PAS Amvrakikos Vonitsa
1995–96	Odisseas Nydri	1–0	PAS Preveza
1996–97	PAS Preveza	4–0	Odisseas Nydri
1997–98	Odisseas Nydri	3–1	AO Mesopotamos
1998–99	Tilikratis Lefkada	3–1	PAS Amvrakikos Vonitsa
1999–00	PAS Preveza	3–0	Tilikratis Lefkada
2000–01	PAS Preveza	6–1	PAS Amvrakikos Vonitsa
2001–02	PAS Preveza	2–0	Apollon Parga
2002–03	PAS Preveza	5–3	Tilikratis Lefkada
2003–04	Ethnikos Filippiada	0–0 (6–5 pen)	Odisseas Nydri
2004–05	PAS Preveza	4–1	Ethnikos Filippiada
2005–06	Ethnikos Filippiada	2–0 (et)	Apollon Parga
2006–07	PAS Preveza	1–0	Apollon Parga
2007–08	Apollon Parga	1–1 (3–1 pen)	Tilikratis Lefkada
2008–09	Thriamvos Louros	4–0	Odisseas Nydri
2009–10	Tilikratis Lefkada	1–0	Odisseas Nydri
2010–11	Tilikratis Lefkada	3–0	AE Preveza
2011–12	Odisseas Nydri	1–0	Ethnikos Filippiada
2012–13	Ethnikos Filippiada	0–0 (5–4 pen)	Odisseas Nydri
2013–14	Elpides Odisseas Nydri	3–3 (4–2 pen)	AE Preveza
2014–15	Thriamvos Louros	1–0	Panlefkadios
2015–16	Ethnikos Filippiada	1–1 (7–6 pen)	Tilikratis Lefkada
2016–17	Apollon Parga	2–1	Panlefkadios
2017–18	Tilikratis Lefkada	2–0	Ethnikos Filippiada
2018–19	Tilikratis Lefkada	3-0	Panlefkadios
2019–20	Abandoned		
2020–21	Abandoned		
2021–22	Tilikratis Lefkada	3-0	Thriamvos Louros
2022–23	Tilikratis Lefkada	2-1	Apollon Parga
2023–24	Ermis Kanali	2-0	Thriamvos Louros
2024–25	Tilikratis Lefkada	4-0	PAS Acheron Kanallaki
2025–26	Tilikratis Lefkada	1-0	PAS Acheron Kanallaki

=== Performance by Club ===
Club	Titles	Runner-up	Years (Titles)	Years (Runner-up)
Tilikratis Lefkada	11	5	1988, 1990, 1999, 2010, 2011, 2018, 2019, 2022, 2023, 2025, 2026	1989, 2000, 2003, 2008, 2016
PAS Preveza	11	1	1982, 1986, 1989, 1993, 1997, 2000, 2001, 2002, 2003, 2005, 2007	1996
Ethnikos Filippiada	6	5	1984, 1992, 2004, 2006, 2013, 2016	1985, 1987, 2005, 2012, 2018
Odisseas Nydri	4	6	1995, 1996, 1998, 2012	1993, 1997, 2004, 2009, 2010, 2013
Apollon Parga	2	5	2008, 2017	1983, 2002, 2006, 2007, 2023
PAS Amvrakikos Vonitsa	2	4	1987, 1991	1986, 1995, 1999, 2001
PAS Acheron Kanallaki	2	3	1983, 1994	1991, 2025, 2026
Thriamvos Louros	2	2	2009, 2015	2022, 2024
Keravnos Thesprotiko	1	2	1985	1984, 1988
Elpides Odisseas Nydri	1	-	2014	-
Ermis Kanali	1	-	2024	-
AE Preveza	-	5	-	1990, 1992, 1994, 2011, 2014
Panlefkadios	-	3	-	2015, 2017, 2019
AO Mesopotamos	-	2	-	1982, 1998

== Super Cup ==
The Preveza-Lefkada FCA Super Cup is a football one match competition, which is contested annually by the Preveza-Lefkada A Division champion, and the winner of the Preveza-Lefkada FCA Cup.

Season	Clubs	Score
2013	PAS Preveza-Ethnikos Filippiada	1–2
2014	PAS Acheron Kanallaki-Tilikratis Lefkada	1–0
2015	PAS Acheron Kanallaki-Thriamvos Louros	2–1 (et)
2016	Tilikratis Lefkada-Ethnikos Filippiada	1–2 (et)
2017	Panlefkadios-Apollon Parga	1–0
2018	Tilikratis Lefkada-PAS Acheron Kanallaki	4–2 (et)
2019	PAS Preveza-Tilikratis Lefkada	3-1
2022	Apollon Parga-Tilikratis Lefkada	1-0
2023	Thriamvos Louros--Tilikratis Lefkada (U-19)	3-0

=== Performance by Club ===
Club	Titles	Runner-up	Years (Titles)	Years (Runner-up)
PAS Acheron Kanallaki	2	1	2014, 2015	2018
Ethnikos Filippiada	2	-	2013, 2016	-
Tilikratis Lefkada	1	5	2018	2014, 2016, 2019, 2022, 2023
PAS Preveza	1	1	2019	2013
Apollon Parga	1	1	2022	2017
Thriamvos Louros	1	1	2023	2015
Panlefkadios	1	-	2017	-

== Preveza-Lefkada FCA clubs in National divisions ==
Club	First Division (Since 1959-60)	Second Division (Since 1962-63)	Third Division (Since 1965-66)	Fourth Division (Since 1982-83)	2023-24
PAS Preveza	0	2	15	22	-
Tilikratis Lefkada	0	1	8	23	Super League Greece 2
Ethnikos Filippiada	0	0	8	18	Preveza-Lefkada FCA A Division
PAS Acheron Kanallaki	0	0	4	9	Preveza-Lefkada FCA A Division
PAS Amvrakikos Vonitsa	0	0	2	8	Preveza-Lefkada FCA A Division
Apollon Parga	0	0	1	11	Preveza-Lefkada FCA A Division
Keravnos Thesprotiko	0	0	1	3	Preveza-Lefkada FCA B Division
Panlefkadios	0	0	1	0	Preveza-Lefkada FCA A Division
Odisseas Nydri	0	0	0	7	Preveza-Lefkada FCA A Division
AE Preveza	0	0	0	2	Preveza-Lefkada FCA B Division
Thriamvos Louros	0	0	0	2	Preveza-Lefkada FCA A Division

== Teams in national divisions ==
Two teams participate in national divisions in the 2026–27 season :

- Gamma Ethniki:
  - PAS Preveza
  - Tilikratis
