= Chris Pantazidis =

Greek footballer

Christos Pantazidis (born 3 November 1995) is a Greek footballer who plays as a defensive midfielder. Born in Kavala, he has played in Aris Akropotamos F.C. Vyrwn Kavalas, Aek Kavalas, Keravnos Keratea F.C.
