= Prosotsani F.C. =

Prosotsani
- Full name: Gymnastikos Syllogos Prosotsanis
- Nickname: Μαύρος Ποντικός
- Founded: 1970; 56 years ago
- Ground: Municipal Stadium of Prosotsani Georgios Makris
- Capacity: 1,200
- Chairman: Georgios Vougiouklis
- Manager: Giannis Ioannidis
- League: Drama FCA First Division
- 2025–26: Drama FCA First Division, 8th
- Website: http://www.prosotsanifc.gr/
Home colours	Away colours

GS Prosotsani is a football club based in Prosotsani, Greece. It was founded in 1970.In 2007 they managed to gain promotion to National C Division (Football League 2 or Gamma Ethniki). They were relegated in 2008.

There is also a fan club, Aparadektoi, which supports the team. It was founded in 1995.
