= Doxa Theologos Potos F.C. =

Doxa Theologos
- Full name: AO Doxa Theologos Potos Football Club
- Founded: 1979; 47 years ago
- Ground: Potos Municipal Stadium
- Chairman: Nikolaos Tsilogeorgis
- Manager: Pavlov Provatidis
- League: Kavala FCA First Division
- 2025–26: Kavala FCA First Division, 10th

Doxa Theologos Potos Football Club (Greek: Δόξα Θεολόγου Ποτού Θάσου) is a Greek football club based in Theologos, Thasos, Greece.

== Honours ==
=== Domestic ===
  - Kavala FCA Champions: 1
    - 2018–19
