= Panlefkadios F.C. =

Panlefkadios
- Founded: 1986 as A.O. Kalamitsi; 2013 as Panlefkadios F.C.
- Ground: Sfakiotes Municipal Ground
- Chairman: Panagiotis Meidanis
- Manager: Nikolaos Mimigiannis
- League: Preveza-Lefkada FCA First Division
- 2025–26: Preveza-Lefkada FCA First Division, 5th
Home colours	Away colours

Panlefkadios F.C. (Greek: Πανλευκάδιος Α.Σ.Κ.) is a Greek football club, based in Kalamitsi, Lefkada, Greece.

== History ==
The men's football department was founded in 1986 under the name A.O. Kalamitsiou. From its inception until 2017, it participated in the local championships of the Preveza-Lefkada FCA.

On 20 July 2013, following a General Assembly, an amendment to the club's charter was approved to rename the team from A.O. Kalamitsiou to Panlevkadios A.S. Kalamitsi. The word "Kalamitsi" and the founding year were retained as an honor to those who served A.O. Kalamitsiou and ensured its history was preserved.

By winning the Preveza-Lefkada FCA championship in the 2016–17 season, the club earned promotion to the Gamma Ethniki for the first time in its history.

== Honors ==
=== Domestic Titles and honors ===
  - Preveza-Lefkada FCA Champions: 1
    - 2016–17
  - Preveza-Lefkada FCA Super Cup Winners: 1
    - 2016-17
