= Makedones FC =

MAKEDONES F.C.
- Full name: Makedones Football Club
- Founded: 1987
- Ground: Ambelokipi Municipal Stadium
- Capacity: 1,000
- Chairman: Manolis Papastavrou
- League: Macedonia Football Clubs Association
- 2014-15: Macedonia Football Clubs Association 12th

Makedones Thessalonikis F.C. (Greek: Γ.Σ Μακεδόνες Θεσσαλονίκης), the Macedonians, is a professional football club based in Ampelokipoi, Thessaloniki, Greece.

The club, originally named MAKEDON, was founded in 1987 from the merger of Megas Alexandros FC. .
