= Aetoloacarnania Football Clubs Association =

Association football governing body in Aetolia–Acarnania Prefecture, Greece

- Full name: Aetolia–Acarnania Football Clubs Association; Greek: Ένωση Ποδοσφαιρικών Σωματείων Αιτωλίας–Ακαρνανίας
- Short name: Aetolia–Acarnania F.C.A.; Greek: Ε.Π.Σ. Αιτωλίας–Ακαρνανίας
- Founded: 1968; 58 years ago
- Headquarters: Missolonghi, Greece
- FIFA affiliation: Hellenic Football Federation
- President: Panagiotis Papachristos
- Website: www.epsaitol.gr

Aetoloacarnania Football Clubs Association (Greek: Ένωση Ποδοσφαιρικών Σωματείων Αιτωλίας–Ακαρνανίας) is responsible for football in Aetolia–Acarnania Prefecture. Its offices are housed in Missolonghi and it is a member of the HFF. It is responsible for running the local league and cup, as well as the youth and children's leagues. It also coordinates the activities of the mixed youth and children's groups, which represent the county at national level. The teams from the former "Kapodistrian" municipalities of Anaktorio, Kekropia and Menidi of Aetoloacarnania do not participate in the Union.

== History ==
It was founded as an independent Association in 1968, as in previous years the teams of the prefecture of Aetoloacarnania took part in the championships organized by the Achaea Football Clubs Association. The Association was also known as the "Association of Football Clubs of the Prefecture of Aetoloacarnania" (EPSNA). The founding members of the association were AE Messolonghi, Aris Aitoliko, AO Trikardos Katochi, Achilleas Gramatikous, AE Arakynthos Mataranga, AO Pentalofou, AO Pappadata, Iraklis Astakos

== League ==
=== Organization ===
The structure of the championship of Aetoloacarnania Football Clubs Association is consisted of 3 divisions

=== List of Champions ===
Season	Winner
1968–69	AE Messolonghi
1969–70	AE Messolonghi
1970–71	AE Messolonghi
1971–72	AE Messolonghi
1972–73	Panetolikos
1973–74	AE Messolonghi
1974–75	Aris Aitoliko
1975–76	Aris Aitoliko^{*}
1976–77	AE Messolonghi
1977–78	Amfilochos Amfilochia
1978–79	AO Agrinio
1979–80	AS Omiros Neochori
1980–81	Nafpaktiakos Asteras
1981–82	AO Trikardos Katochi (1st group)
1981–82	AO Agrinio (2nd group)
1982–83	Kalydona Evinochori (1st group)
1982–83	AS Asteras Agrinio (2nd group)
1983–84	AO Trikardos Katochi (1st group)
1983–84	Amfilochos Amfilochia (2nd group)
1983–84	PAO Kalyvia (3rd group)
1984–85	AE Messolonghi (1st group)
1984–85	PAO Kalyvia (2nd group)
1984–85	AEK Agios Konstantinos (3rd group)
1985–86	Evinos Evinochori (1st group)
1985–86	AS Asteras Agrinio (2nd group)
1985–86	AEK Agios Konstantinos (3rd group)
1986–87	Evinos Evinochori (1st group)
1986–87	Amfilochos Amfilochia (2nd group)
1987–88	AE Messolonghi (1st group)
1987–88	PAO Kalyvia (2nd group)
1988–89	AS Omiros Neochori (1st group)
1988–89	Amfilochos Amfilochia (2nd group)
1989–90	AE Arakynthos Mataranga/Pappadata
1990–91	Nafpaktiakos Asteras
1991–92	AO Atromitos Antirrio
1992–93	Aris Aitoliko
1993–94	Amfilochos Amfilochia
1994–95	AO Atromitos Antirrio
1995–96	AEK Agios Konstantinos
1996–97	AO Elaiofytiou
1997–98	MAK Acharnaikos Fyteion
1998–99	Aris Aitoliko
1999–2000	AE Messolonghi
2000–01	AE Messolonghi
2001–02	Thermios Apollon
2002–03	AO Atromitos Antirrio
2003–04	Kentavros Antirrio
2004–05	MAS Acharnaikos Fyteion
2005–06	AO Atromitos Antirrio
2006–07	MAS Acharnaikos Fyteion
2007–08	AO Eleofyteio
2008–09	AE Messolonghi
2009–10	AS Omiros Neochori
2010–11	Amfilochos Amfilochia
2011–12	Aris Aitoliko
2012–13	Nafpaktiakos Asteras
2013–14	AS Omiros Neochori
2014–15	AE Messolonghi
2015–16	Nafpaktiakos Asteras
2016–17	GSP Panamvrakikos Boukas
2017–18	Nafpaktiakos Asteras
2018–19	AE Messolonghi
2019–20	GFS Amvrakikos Loutro^{**}
2020–21	Suspended
2021–22	AO Anagennisi Stano
2022–23	AE Messolonghi
2023–24	Panagriniakos
2024–25	Aris Lepenous
2025–26	Panagriniakos

^{*}AO Agrinio finished first, but were demoted for attempted bribery and thus the second, Aris Aitoliko were crowned champions.

^{**} Due to the suspension of all the championships of the association due to the COVID-19 pandemic, Amvrakikos Loutro were crowned champion and got the ticket to the Gamma Ethniki of the following season. However, the interruption caused the reaction of Panagriniakos, because they were in first place one matchday before the interruption, but they finished second, since Amvrakikos Loutro got a 3–0 over AO Chalkia, who had withdrawn from the league, while they were defeated 1–0 by Apollon Atsikio. Finally on August 19, while the preparation of the groups of the 2020–21 Gamma Ethniki by the HFF was taking place, it was also announced that Panagriniakos would compete in the tournament and thus the prefecture of Aetoloacarnania was represented by 4 clubs.

== Cup ==
=== Winners ===
Season	Winner
1971–72	AE Messolonghi
1972–73	Panetolikos
1973–74	Aris Aitoliko
1974–75	AO Agrinio
1975–76	Not finished
1976–77	Aris Aitoliko
1977–78	AO Agrinio
1978–79	AE Messolonghi
1979–80	Amfilochos Amfilochia
1980–81	Nafpaktiakos Asteras
1981–82	AO Agrinio
1982–83	AO Agrinio
1983–84	Asteras Agrinio
1984–85	AS Omiros Neochori
1985–86	AS Omiros Neochori
1986–87	AOK Union/Trikardos Katochi
1987–88	AE Messolonghi
1988–89	Panetolikos
1989–90	Acheloos Aggelokastro
1990–91	Nafpaktiakos Asteras
1991–92	AE Arakynthos Mataranga/Pappadata
1992–93	Nafpaktiakos Asteras
1993–94	AEK Agios Konstantinos
1994–95	Nafpaktiakos Asteras
1995–96	AE Agios Dimitrios
1996–97	AE Messolonghi
1997–98	AS Promytheas Gavrolimni
1998–99	Aris Aitoliko
1999–2000	AE Messolonghi
2000–01	AE Messolonghi
2001–02	Thermios Apollon
2002–03	AO Atromitos Antirrio
2003–04	MAS Acharnaikos Fyteion
2004–05	Nafpaktiakos Asteras
2005–06	MAS Acharnaikos Fyteion
2006–07	AO Eleofyteio
2007–08	AE Messolonghi
2008–09	Nafpaktiakos Asteras
2009–10	G.O. Messolonghi
2010–11	Panetolikos amateurs
2011–12	AE Messolonghi
2012–13	GFS Amvrakikos Loutro
2013–14	Nafpaktiakos Asteras
2014–15	AO Floga Paleomanina
2015–16	AO Chalkeia
2016–17	AE Messolonghi
2017–18	Amfilochos Amfilochia
2018–19	AS Omiros Neochori
2019–20	AE Messolonghi
2020–21	Suspended
2021–22	Nafpaktiakos Asteras
2022–23	Panagriniakos
2023–24	Panagriniakos
2024–25	Panagriniakos
2025–26	Panagriniakos

== Super Cup ==
=== Winners ===
Year	Winner
2010	AS Omiros Neochori
2011	Amfilochos Amfilochia
2012	AE Messolonghi
2013	Nafpaktiakos Asteras
2014	AS Omiros Neochori
2015	AO Floga Paleomanina
2016	Nafpaktiakos Asteras
2017	Amfilochos Amfilochia
2018	AE Messolonghi

== Teams in national divisions ==
Two teams participate in national divisions in the 2026–27 season :

- Super League Greece
  - Panetolikos
- Gamma Ethniki:
  - Panagriniakos
