= Wellington Gonçalves =

Brazilian footballer (born 1983)

Personal information
- Full name: Wellington Daniel dos Santos Gonçalves
- Date of birth: 7 July 1983 (age 43)
- Place of birth: Jacareí, Brazil
- Height: 1.76 m (5 ft 9 in)

Senior career*
Years	Team	Apps	(Gls)
-2002	Jacareí		
2003–2008	Apollon Kalamarias	99	(10)
2008–2009	Thrasyvoulos	25	(13)
2009–2010	Diagoras	11	(1)
2010–2011	Anagennisi Karditsa	12	(2)
2010–2011	Agrotikos Asteras	10	(3)
2011–2012	Doxa Drama	15	(4)
2012–2013	Niki Volos	28	(8)
2013–2014	Panelefsiniakos	13	(6)
2014-15	Dotieas Agias		
2015	GAS Rodochoriou		
2016	FAS Naousa		
- * Club domestic league appearances and goals

Wellington Daniel dos Santos Gonçalves (born July 7, 1983) is a Brazilian former footballer.

== Career ==
Wellington moved to Greece in March 2003, initially joining Apollon Kalamarias on a two-year contract. In February 2005, he extended his stay with Apollon for another 3 years.

In August 2008, he joined Thrasyvoulos on a one-year contract. Successive six-month spells with Diagoras and Agrotikos Asteras followed.

In July 2010, Wellington moved to Agrotikos Asteras on a two-year contract.
