= Drama Football Clubs Association =

Association football governing body in Drama Prefecture, Greece

- Full name: Drama Football Clubs Association; Greek: Ένωση Ποδοσφαιρικών Σωματείων Δράμας
- Short name: Drama F.C.A.; Greek: Ε.Π.Σ. Δράμας
- Founded: 1963; 63 years ago
- Headquarters: Drama, Greece
- FIFA affiliation: Hellenic Football Federation
- President: Georgios Chatzisaroglou
- Website: epsdramas.gr

Drama Football Clubs Association (Greek: Ένωση Ποδοσφαιρικών Σωματείων Δράμας) is representing teams from Drama Prefecture. Is also a member of Hellenic Football Federation.

== History ==
Its predecessor was the Macedonia Football Clubs Association (EPSM), which was responsible for the sport in the Prefectures of Kavala and Drama. In 1963, the clubs of the Prefecture of Drama separated from the Eastern Macedonia Football Clubs Association, when the Drama Football Clubs Association was born.

== Divisions ==
Drama FCA teams are split in two divisions.

- A division
- B division

== League ==
=== Champions ===
Season	Champion
1964–65	Doxa Sitagron
1965–66	AE Kyrgia
1966–67	
1967–68	Elpis Drama
1968–69	Aris Drama
1969–70	Pandramaikos
1970–71	Filippoi Doxato
1971–72	Akritas Nea Kromni
1972–73	Doxa Sitagron
1973–74	Doxa Sitagron
1974–75	A.E. Kalampaki
1975–76	
1976–77	
1977–78	PAO Pontioi Nea Amissos
1978–79	A.E. Kalampaki
1979–80	Akritas Kato Nevrokopi
1980–81	Megas Alexandros Agios Athanasios
1981–82	PAO Pontioi Nea Amissos
1982–83	Akritas Nea Kromni
1983–84	Akritas Kato Nevrokopi
1984–85	Orfeas Choristi
1985–86	Megas Alexandros Agios Athanasios
1986–87	Doxa Petroussa
1987–88	AE Ampelokipoi Drama
1988–89	Ethnikos Asteras Kallifytos
1989–90	Akropoli Drama
1990–91	Anakalypsi Ampelokipoi Drama
1991–92	Megas Alexandros Agios Athanasios
1992–93	Akritas Nea Kromni
1993–94	A.E. Kalampaki
1994–95	PAO Pontioi Nea Amissos
1995–96	Doxa Petroussa
1996–97	PAO Pontioi Nea Amissos
1997–98	Akritas Nea Kromni
1998–99	Asteras Koudounia
1999–00	Akritas Nea Kromni
2000–01	Keravnos Arkadikos
2001–02	Pandramaikos
2002–03	Anakalypsi Ampelokipoi Drama
2003–04	Prosotsani
2004–05	A.E. Kalampaki
2005–06	Megas Alexandros Agios Athanasios
2006–07	Pandramaikos
2007–08	Doxa Petroussa
2008–09	A.E. Kalampaki
2009–10	Pandramaikos
2010–11	AE Ampelokipoi Drama
2011–12	Doxa Petroussa
2012–13	Akritas Kato Nevrokopi
2013–14	Filippoi Doxato
2014–15	Prosotsani
2015–16	Doxa Petroussa
2016–17	Megas Alexandros Xiropotamos
2017–18	A.E. Kalampaki
2018–19	Pandramaikos
2019–20	AE Ampelokipoi Drama
2020–21	Abandoned
2021–22	Prosotsani
2022–23	Doxa Volakas
2023–24	PAO Pontioi Nea Amissos
2024–25	Doxa Drama
2025–26	PAO Pontioi Nea Amissos

=== Performance by club ===
Club	Titles	Season
PAO Pontioi Nea Amissos	6	1978, 1982, 1995, 1997, 2024, 2026
A.E. Kalampaki	6	1975, 1979, 1994, 2005, 2009, 2018
Pandramaikos	5	1970, 2002, 2007, 2010, 2019
Akritas Nea Kromni	5	1972, 1983, 1993, 1998, 2000
Doxa Petroussa	5	1987, 1996, 2008, 2012, 2016
Megas Alexandros Agios Athanasios	4	1981, 1986, 1992, 2006
Doxa Sitagron	3	1965, 1973, 1974
Akritas Kato Nevrokopi	3	1980, 1984, 2013
AE Ampelokipoi Drama	3	1988, 2011, 2020
Prosotsani	3	2004, 2015, 2022
Filippoi Doxato	2	1971, 2014
Anakalypsi Ampelokipoi Drama	2	1991, 2003
AE Kyrgia	1	1966
Elpis Drama	1	1968
Aris Drama	1	1969
Orfeas Choristi	1	1985
Ethnikos Asteras Kallifytos	1	1989
Akropoli Drama	1	1990
Asteras Koudounia	1	1999
Keravnos Arkadikos	1	2001
Megas Alexandros Xiropotamos	1	2017
Doxa Volakas	1	2023
Doxa Drama	1	2025

== Cup ==
=== Cup Winners ===
Season	Winner
1971–72	Doxa Sitagron
1972–73	AE Kyrgia
1973–74	Doxa Sitagron
1974–75	Prosotsani
1975–76	Iraklis Mavrovatos
1976–77	Iraklis Mavrovatos
1977–78	Megas Alexandros Xiropotamos
1978–79	Pandramaikos
1979–80	Aris Kalamonas
1980–81	Akritas Nea Kromni
1981–82	Pandramaikos
1982–83	Pandramaikos
1983–84	Pandramaikos
1984–85	Akritas Nea Kromni
1985–86	Pandramaikos
1986–87	Akritas Nea Kromni
1987–88	Anakalypsi Ampelokipoi Drama
1988–89	Doxa Drama (Amateurs)
1989–90	AE Ampelokipoi Drama
1990–91	Akritas Nea Kromni
1991–92	Anakalypsi Ampelokipoi Drama
1992–93	A.E. Kalampaki
1993–94	Keravnos Monastiraki
1994–95	Megas Alexandros Agios Athanasios
1995–96	Pandramaikos
1996–97	Pandramaikos
1997–98	PAO Pontioi Nea Amissos
1998–99	Pandramaikos
1999–00	AE Kyrgia
2000–01	Doxa Drama
2001–02	Doxa Drama
2002–03	Anakalypsi Ampelokipoi Drama
2003–04	Prosotsani
2004–05	Prosotsani
2005–06	Megas Alexandros Agios Athanasios
2006–07	Pandramaikos
2007–08	Filippoi Doxato
2008–09	A.E. Kalampaki
2009–10	Pandramaikos
2010–11	Prosotsani
2011–12	Akritas Kato Nevrokopi
2012–13	Doxa Petroussa
2013–14	Ethnikos Asteras Kallifytos
2014–15	Aris Fotolivos
2015–16	Doxa Drama
2016–17	Prosotsani
2017–18	A.E. Kalampaki
2018–19	Pandramaikos
2019–20	AE Ampelokipoi Drama
2020–21	Cancelled due to COVID-19
2021–22	A.E. Kalampaki
2022–23	Doxa Volakas
2023–24	Doxa Volakas
2024–25	Doxa Drama
2025–26	Doxa Volakas

=== Performance by club ===
Club	Titles	Season
Pandramaikos	11	1979, 1982, 1983, 1984, 1986, 1996, 1997, 1999, 2007, 2010, 2019
Prosotsani	5	1975, 2004, 2005, 2011, 2017
Doxa Drama / Doxa Drama (Amateurs)	5	1989, 2001, 2002, 2016, 2025
Akritas Nea Kromni	4	1981, 1985, 1987, 1991
A.E. Kalampaki	4	1993, 2009, 2018, 2022
Anakalypsi Ampelokipoi Drama	3	1988, 1992, 2003
Doxa Volakas	3	2023, 2024, 2026
Doxa Sitagron	2	1972, 1974
AE Kyrgia	2	1973, 2000
Iraklis Mavrovatos	2	1976, 1977
AE Ampelokipoi Drama	2	1990, 2020
Megas Alexandros Agios Athanasios	2	1995, 2006
Megas Alexandros Xiropotamos	1	1978
Aris Kalamonas	1	1980
Keravnos Monastiraki	1	1994
PAO Pontioi Nea Amissos	1	1998
Filippoi Doxato	1	2008
Akritas Kato Nevrokopi	1	2012
Doxa Petroussa	1	2013
Ethnikos Asteras Kallifytos	1	2014
Aris Fotolivos	1	2015

== Super Cup ==
=== Finals ===
Season	Winner	Runner-up	Score
2004	Pandramaikos	Prosotsani	1–0
2006	Doxa Petroussa	Megas Alexandros Agios Athanasios	?
2007	Prosotsani	Pandramaikos	?
2010	Pandramaikos	A.E. Kalampaki	?
2011	Prosotsani	AE Ampelokipoi Drama	?
2012	Akritas Kato Nevrokopi	Doxa Petroussa	2–1
2013	Doxa Petroussa	Akritas Kato Nevrokopi	2–1
2014	Filippoi Doxato	Ethnikos Asteras Kallifytos	1–0
2015	Prosotsani	Aris Fotolivos	2–1
2016	Doxa Drama	Doxa Petroussa	1–0
2017	Megas Alexandros Xiropotamos	Prosotsani	3–0
2018	Prosotsani	A.E. Kalampaki	2–0
2019	Pandramaikos	Doxa Volakas	3–0
2022	Prosotsani	A.E. Kalampaki	3–1
2023	Doxa Volakas	Pandramaikos	0–0 (5–3 p)
2024	Doxa Volakas	PAO Pontioi Nea Amissos	1–0
2025	Megas Alexandros Agios Athanasios	Doxa Drama	2–1
2026	PAO Pontioi Nea Amissos	Doxa Volakas	1–0
