= Nikolaos Platanos =

Greek footballer

Personal information
- Date of birth: 12 April 1984 (age 42)
- Place of birth: Elefsis, Greece
- Height: 1.76 m (5 ft 9 1/2 in)
- Position: Left back

Team information
- Current team: Panelefsiniakos

Youth career
- –2001: Panelefsiniakos

Senior career*
Years	Team	Apps	(Gls)
2001–2004	Panelefsiniakos	44	(0)
2004–2007	Proodeftiki	41	(0)
2007–2009	Kalamata	55	(0)
2009	Ethnikos Asteras	2	(0)
2010	Pierikos	8	(0)
2010–2011	Diagoras	25	(1)
2011	Vyzas Megara	8	(0)
2011–2012	Iraklis Psachna	19	(0)
2012	Kallithea	9	(0)
2013	Iraklis Psachna	16	(0)
2013–	Panelefsiniakos	8	(0)
- * Club domestic league appearances and goals

Nikolaos Platanos (or Nikos Platanos) (Greek: Νικόλαος Πλάτανος; born 12 April 1984) is a Greek footballer currently playing for Football League 2 side Panelefsiniakos.

== Career ==
Platanos began his pro career with Panelefsiniakos in 2001–2002 season in the Football League 2. After approximately 200 games with Proodeftiki, Kalamata, Ethnikos Asteras, Pierikos, Diagoras, Vyzas Megara, Iraklis Psachna and Kallithea in Football League 2 and Football League, he returned to Panelefsiniakos in summer 2013, 9 years since he left the team.
