= A.E. Messolonghi F.C. =

Greek football club

AE Messolonghi
- Full name: Athlitiki Enosi Messolonghi
- Founded: 1931; 95 years ago
- Ground: Messolonghi Municipal Stadium
- Capacity: 2,800
- Chairman: Nikos Karapanos
- Manager: Vacant
- League: Aetoloacarnania FCA First Division
- 2025–26: Aetoloacarnania FCA First Division, 2nd
Home colours	Away colours

A.E. Messolonghi Football Club (Greek: Α.Ε. Μεσολογγίου) is a Greek football club based in Messolonghi, Aetolia-Acarnania, Greece. The club was founded in 1931.

== History ==
At the dawn of 1930, various sports clubs were founded in Messolonghi, including Panetolikos and Olympiacos, which created football teams. Panetolikos will be superior, it will give friendly meetings with Panetolikos Agrinio and the weaknesses that will appear will lead to the need to create a strong team in our city, through the unification of clubs. Finally, after meetings of agents and the persuasion of the then Prefect of Aitoloacarnania, the establishment of a joint acceptance group, called Athlitiki Enosis Messolonghi, was achieved at the beginning of 1931 (perhaps within March). Its first vital potential consists of players mainly from Panetolikos and Olympiacos, while other sources also mention the participation in the merger of other smaller teams (Niki, Keravnos, Asteras, Dafni, Atromitos, etc.). Its first board of directors consists of Messrs. Kaloulis, Katassos, Mores, Papoutsopoulos, Kantzouros etc., while its main players during the pre-war period were Dres (GK), Fakkas, Giannopoulos, Linardatos, Katsaitis, Zavitsanakis, Makedonopoulos, Galanis, Valakros, Valsakas, Vsaromakis, Stavropoulos Lampiris etc. The captain of the club and its first scorer during this period was Panagiotis Stavropoulos, later a member of the ERE. After a mediocre start, AE Messolonghi is slowly being organized, creating a strong team that is gaining experience and in 1934 is recording its top pre-war success, winning the championship of Etoloakarnania, defeating Panaitolikos Agrinio. Unfortunately, in 1936, the club became inactive and almost disbanded, due to the degradation of football in the Greek countryside, but also the actions of the dictatorship of Ioannis Metaxas (establishment of EON, etc.).

After the liberation, two new football clubs were founded in Messolonghi in 1946, Niki and Ethnikos, which are characterized by their political differences (left and right). In December 1946, they fought each other in two friendlies and Niki won overwhelmingly. A few days later, administrations and players of the two unions, leaving aside their political passions and in the midst of the civil war, set an example of reconciliation and re-established the historic AE Messolonghi. A steering committee was formed including Messrs. Katasou, Lykoudis, Papatheodorou, Kyrili, Satrazemi, Galanopoulou, Fakka, and Rapesi, and at the beginning of 1947 the old ace of Iraklis Thessaloniki, Dimitris Kollias, was hired as a player-coach. Using his knowledge and experience, he created a team which, in the next two years, achieved victories and impressed fans. The executives of this group were Theofilatos, Synodinos, Nezeritis, Katsantonis, brothers Rigas and brothers Livieratou, Hasiotis, Raftopoulos, Papanastasiou, Karyofyllis, Kapnisis, Karavias, Apostolopoulos etc.

== Honours ==
=== Domestic ===
  - Delta Ethniki Champions: 2
    - 1993–94, 2012–13
  - Aetoloacarnania FCA Champions: 14
    - 1968–69, 1969–70, 1970–71, 1971–72, 1973–74, 1976–77, 1984–85, 1987–88, 1999–2000, 2000–01, 2008–09, 2014–15, 2018–19, 2022–23
  - Aetoloacarnania FCA Cup Winners: 8
    - 1971–72, 1978–79, 1987–88, 1996–97, 2007–08, 2011–12, 2016–17, 2019–20
  - Aetoloacarnania FCA Super Cup Winners: 2
    - 2012, 2018
