= A.O. Trikala 1963 F.C. =

Greek football club

Trikala 1963
- Full name: A.O. Trikala 1963 F.C.
- Founded: 2011 (as A.S. Trikala 2011)
- Dissolved: 2014
- Ground: Municipal Trikala Stadium
- Capacity: 15,000
Home colours	Away colours

Trikala 1963 F.C. was a Greek football club, based in Trikala, Trikala.

The club was founded in 2011, when Thyella Petrotou changed its name to Trikala 1963. They played in Football League 2 for the 2013–14 season, but folded after the season ended due to the club's unpopularity and ongoing dispute regarding its resemblance to Trikala F.C.

== History ==
The club was founded in 2011 when the team of Thyella Petroto changed its name to A.S. Trikala 2011. Participated for two seasons at Delta Ethniki and after 2012–13 season gain the promotion for Football League 2. On 29 May 2013 the name of the team changed with legal decision in Trikala 1963. There are still legal issues to be resolved regarding the name and logo of the club, as they are similar to the historic and currently active team of A.O Trikala which was founded in 1963, thus causing confusion to the public. At August 2014 the president of the club decided not to participate at the Football League 2 the upcoming season, and to dissolve the team because of the hatred of the fans at the city of Trikala and the low attendance at the stadium.

== League history ==
- 2011–12: Delta Ethniki Group 5 2nd
- 2012–13: Delta Ethniki Group 5 5th (Promotion)
- 2013–14: Football League 2 Group 3 7th
