= Doxa Petroussa F.C. =

Doxa Petroussa
- Full name: Gymnastikos Syllogos Doxa Petroussa
- Founded: 1964
- Ground: Municipal Stadium of Petroussa
- Capacity: 300
- Chairman: Nikos Giagoulas
- Manager: Ilias Pantzaridis
- League: Drama FCA First Division
- 2025–26: Drama FCA First Division, 7th
- Website: https://www.doxapetrousasfc.gr/

Doxa Petroussa Football Club is a Greek football club, based in Petroussa, Drama.

== History ==
• 1964: Doxa Petroussas was founded.
• 1965: They fought for the first time in the Third Amateur category of Drama.
• 1970: Promoted to the B-Amateur category of Drama.
• 1972: promoted to the First Amateur category of Drama.

Since 1972, competes in A-Amateur category of Drama continuously for thirty-five (35) years with the only exception of the 1996-97 season, when they competed in the league in Delta Ethniki.
