= A.O. Kymi =

- Full name: Athlitikos Omilos Kymi
- Founded: 1957; 69 years ago
- Ground: Kymi Municipal Stadium
- League: Euboea FCA Second Division
- 2025–26: Euboea FCA Second Division (Group 2), 3rd
- Website: aokimis.blogspot.gr

A.O. Kymi is a Greek football club, based in Kymi, Euboea.

The club was founded in 1957. They played for regional Euboea FCA Second Division for the season 2025–26.
