= Kastor F.C =

Kastor
- Full name: Athlitikos Omilos Kastor
- Founded: 1985; 41 years ago
- Ground: Municipal Stadium "A.O. Kastor"
- Capacity: 300
- League: Kastoria FCA First Division
- 2025–26: Kastoria FCA First Division, 8th
- Website: http://aokastwr-news.blogspot.gr

Kastor F.C. is a Greek football club, based in Kastoria, Kastoria.

== History ==
Kastor F.C. comes from the merger of two teams of Kastoria city, Orestida and Tsardaikou witch held in 1985. From then until 1993 the men's department took part in local leagues C, B and A class of Eps Kastoria.

At 1994 endangered a final dissolving, because it did not participate in any championship. Due to financial problems, the male part leaves the league.

In 1995 he takes over the Presidency Mr. Stavros Bachanteroglou, who with his colleagues attempt a new start for the club's recovery. The A.O. Kastor now works on a new basis and a new philosophy of the people around him.

== Honours ==
=== Domestic Titles and honours ===
  - Kastoria FCA League: 2
    - 2003–04, 2008–09
  - Kastoria FCA Cup: 4
    - 2004–05, 2009–10, 2010–11, 2011–12
