= Doxa Nea Manolada F.C. =

Doxa Nea Manolada
- Full name: Athlitikos Podosfairikos Omilos Doxa Nea Manolada
- Founded: 1959; 67 years ago
- Ground: Nea Manolada Ground
- Capacity: 400
- Chairman: Konstantinos Michalopoulos
- Manager: Lakis Athanasopoulos
- League: Elis FCA First Division
- 2025–26: Elis FCA First Division, 2nd

Doxa Nea Manolada F.C. (Greek: Α.Π.Ο. Δόξα Νέας Μανωλάδας) is a Greek football club, based in Nea Manolada, Elis.

The club was founded in 1959. They will play for 2nd season in Football League 2 for the season 2014–15.

== Honours ==
=== Regional ===
- Elis FCA First Division
  - Winners (1): 2011–12
- Elis FCA Cup
  - Winners (2): 2015–16, 2025–26
- Elis FCA Super Cup
  - Winners (1): 2012
