= Keravnos Thesprotiko F.C. =

Keravnos Thesprotiko
- Full name: Athlitikos Podosfairikos Syllogos Keravnos Thesprotiko
- Founded: 1954; 72 years ago
- Ground: Thesprotiko Municipal Stadium "Ekaterini Thanou"
- Capacity: 500
- Chairman: Rempis Zikos
- Manager: Fitzios Evangelos
- League: Preveza-Lefkada FCA First Division
- 2025–26: Preveza-Lefkada FCA First Division, 8th
- Website: http://keravnosthe.blogspot.gr

Keravnos Thesprotiko F.C. is a Greek football club, based in Thesprotiko, Preveza.

The club was founded in 1954.
