= Ethnikos Sageika F.C. =

Ethnikos Sageika
- Full name: Athlitikos Podosfairikos Syllogos Ethnikos Sageika
- Founded: 1968
- Ground: Sageika Stadium; Sageika, Achaea, Greece
- League: Achaea FCA Second Division
- 2025–26: Achaea FCA Second Division (Group 1), 7th

Ethnikos Sageika F.C. is a Greek football club, based in Sageika, Achaea.

The club was founded in 1968.

== History ==
Founded in 1968 with colors blue and white. It is considered as a natural continuation of Olympiacos Sageika who existing since 1931 as an independent association.

== Honours ==
=== Domestic Titles and honors ===
  - Achaea FCA Champions: 5
    - 1990–91, 1997–98, 2008–09, 2011–12, 2013–14
  - Achaea FCA Cup Winners: 2
    - 1973–74, 1974–75
