= Ethnikos Filippiada F.C. =

Ethnikos Filippiada
- Full name: Ethnikos Filippiada Football Club
- Founded: 1935
- Ground: Municipal Stadium, Filippiada, Preveza, Greece
- Capacity: 2,000
- Chairman: Konstantinos Pappas
- Manager: Dimitrios Thodis
- League: Preveza-Lefkada FCA First Division
- 2025–26: Preveza-Lefkada FCA First Division, 7th
- Website: http://www.ethnikosfilippiadas.gr

Ethnikos Filippiada Football Club is a Greek football club, based in Filippiada.

The association was founded in 1948. In 2008, they were promoted to Gamma Ethniki and played for 10 years until the 2017–2018 season.

== Current squad ==
2015–16 season

Note: Flags indicate national team as defined under FIFA eligibility rules; some limited exceptions apply. Players may hold more than one non-FIFA nationality.

No.	Pos.	Nation	Player
—	GK	GRE	Vasileios Mpantis
—	GK	GRE	Nikolaos Tranoulidis
—	GK	GRE	Georgios Nikolaou
—	GK	GRE	Tilemachos Ekonomou
—	DF	GRE	Konstantinos Lentzos
—	DF	GRE	Evangelos Gatselos
—	DF	GRE	Nikolaos Papavasileiou
—	DF	GRE	Theodoros Giannoulis
—	DF	GRE	Konstantinos Diamantopoulos
—	DF	GRE	Stefanos Mallatos
—	DF	GRE	Angelos Rakopoulos

No.	Pos.	Nation	Player
—	DF	GRE	Themistoklis Nikolaidis
—	MF	GRE	Xenofon Gittas
—	MF	GRE	Antonios Christogiannis
—	MF	GRE	Ioannis Tsakanikas
—	MF	GRE	Christoforos Fotis
—	FW	GRE	Georgios Lappas
—	FW	GRE	Alexandros Koliakis
—	FW	GRE	Athanasios Paparounas
—	FW	GRE	Fotios Sideris
—	FW	GRE	Georgios Velegkas

== Honours ==
=== Domestic ===
League

- Fourth Division
  - Winners (1): 2007–08
- Preveza-Lefkada FCA First Division
  - Winners (5): 1981–82, 1988–89, 1992–93, 1997–98, 2002–03

Cup

- Preveza-Lefkada FCA Cup
  - Winners (6): 1983–84, 1991–92, 2003–04, 2005–06, 2012–13, 2015–16
- Preveza-Lefkada FCA Super Cup
  - Winners (2): 2013, 2016
