= Achilleas Neokaisareia F.C. =

Achilleas Neokaisareia
- Full name: Athlitikos Morfotikos Ekpolitistikos Syllogos Achilleas Neokaisareias
- Founded: 1968
- Ground: Municipal Stadium; Neokaisareia, Pieria, Greece
- Capacity: 600
- League: Pieria FCA

Achilleas Neokaisareias F.C. is a Greek football club, based in Neokaisareia, Pieria.

The club was founded in 1968. They play in the local Regional Championship.
