= Aris Aitoliko F.C. =

Aris Aitoliko
- Full name: Athlitikos Pososfairikos Syllogos Aris Aitoliko
- Founded: 8 May 1926; 100 years ago
- Ground: Aitoliko Municipal Stadium
- Capacity: 2,000
- Chairman: Eleni Mavragani
- Manager: Nikos Kavalieris
- League: Aetoloacarnania FCA Second Division
- 2025–26: Aetoloacarnania FCA Second Division (Group 1), 9th

Aris Aitoliko Football Club (Greek: Άρης Αιτωλικού) is a Greek football club, based in Aitoliko, Aetolia-Acarnania.

The club was founded in 1926. They played in Football League 2 for the season 2013–14.

== Honours ==
=== Domestic ===
  - Aetoloacarnania FCA Champions: 5
    - 1974–75, 1975–76, 1992–93, 1998–99, 2011–12
  - AetoloAcarnania FCA Cup Winners: 2
    - 1973–74, 1976–77
