= A.O. Mykonos =

Greek football club

- Full name: Athlitikos Omilos Mykonos
- Founded: 1981; 45 years ago
- Dissolved: 2020; 6 years ago
- Ground: Mykonos Municipal Stadium
- Capacity: 750

A.O. Mykonos (Greek: Α.Ο. Μυκόνου) was a Greek football club based in Mykonos, Cyclades, Greece.

The club was founded in 1981, and dissolved in 2020 after a merger with A.S. Ano Mera Mykonos to form A.E. Mykonos.

== Honours ==
=== Domestic ===
  - Cyclades FCA Champions: 8
    - 1989–90, 1991–92, 1997–98, 1999–00, 2000–01, 2005–06, 2008–09, 2012–13
  - Cyclades FCA Cup Winners: 8
    - 1998–99, 1999–00, 2000–01, 2001–02, 2002–03, 2007–08, 2009–10, 2010-11
