= Orfeas Eleftheroupoli F.C. =

Orfeas Eleftheroupoli
- Full name: Mousikos Gymnastikos Syllogos Orfeas Eleftheroupoli
- Founded: 1925; 101 years ago
- Ground: Eleftheroupoli Stadium
- Capacity: 1,000
- Chairman: Chrysostomos Manolaras
- Manager: Charalampos Kazepidis
- League: Gamma Ethniki
- 2025–26: Kavala FCA First Division, 1st (promoted)
- Website: http://www.orfeasfc.gr/
Home colours	Away colours

Orfeas Eleftheroupoli Football Club is a Greek football club, based in Eleftheroupoli, Kavala.

The club was founded in 1925. They will play in Gamma Ethniki for the season 2026–27.

== History ==
Music and Gymnastics Club "Orfeas" Eleftheroupoli was founded in 1925. The club has previously competed in the Delta Ethniki. From the 2013–14 season, it participated in the amateur Gamma Ethniki. In the 2014–15 season, it was relegated to the local divisions of the Kavala Football Clubs Association.

During the 2025–26 season, the club won the championship in the Kavala FCA First Division, earning promotion back to the Gamma Ethniki.

== Honours ==
=== Domestic ===
League

- Kavala FCA First Division
  - Winners (17): 1966, 1968, 1969, 1970, 1971, 1974, 1975, 1977, 1981, 1986, 1992, 1995, 1998, 2001, 2007, 2023, 2026

Cup

- Kavala FCA Cup
  - Winners (12): 1977, 1978, 1983, 1993, 1995, 1997, 2001, 2003, 2004, 2012
- Kavala FCA Super Cup
  - Winners (1): 2026
