= Atromitos Achaea F.C. =

Atromitos Achaea
- Full name: Athlitikos Syllogos Achaea Atromitos
- Founded: 1964; 62 years ago
- Ground: Kostas Davourlis Stadium
- Capacity: 11,321
- League: Achaea FCA
- 2018-19: Achaea FCA 2nd

Atromitos Achaea F.C. is a Greek football club, based in Patras, Achaea.

The club was founded in 1964. They will play in Football League 2 for the season 2013–14.

== History ==
Established as Atromitos Lappa F.C. and had a significant presence, especially in the 1970s at regional Achaean league. Started from the third regional Achaean league reached for the first time first regional Achaean league at the period 1969–1970. It played until 1973 to participate once again in 1977 until 1986, returned again in 1990–91 season without success and again in 1993-94 until 1996–97 season.

The 2005-06 became Achaean Champions. Participate in Delta Ethniki during the periods 2006–07, 2007–08, 2008–09, 2009–10, 2010–11, 2011–12 and 2012–13 .

The season 2012-13 finished 2nd at the 6th Group Of Delta Ethniki and will play in Football League 2 for the season 2013–14. Also the name of the club changed from Atromitos Lappa F.C. to Atromitos Achaea F.C. and the transferred from Lappa to Patras

Old Atromitos Lappa F.C. logo

== Honors ==
=== Domestic Titles and honors ===
  - Achaea Champions: 1
    - 2005–06
  - Achaea Cup Winners: 2
    - 2009–10, 2012–13
