= Tilikratis F.C. =

Tilikratis Lefkada
- Full name: A.O. Τηλυκράτης Λευκάδας (A.O. Tilikratis Lefkada)
- Founded: 5 March 1927; 99 years ago
- Ground: Lefkada Stadium
- Capacity: 1,300
- Chairman: Dimitrios Petropoulos
- Manager: Konstantinos Kazanas
- League: Gamma Ethniki
- 2025–26: Gamma Ethniki (Group 3), 6th
Home colours	Away colours

Tilikratis Football Club, also known as AO Tilikratis Lefkada (Greek: ΑΟ Τηλυκράτης Λευκάδας), is a Greek association football club based on the island of Lefkada. Tilikratis is the highest placed football team from the island. As of 2011 they played in Group 5 of Delta Ethniki and, a few days before the end of the 2010–11 season, they won the group to go on to compete in Football League 2 for the 2011–12 season.

== History ==
The first sports club founded in 1925 by students of the Lefkada High School was "Sappho", which operated until 1926. In the same year, by Legislative Decree of the then Ministry of Religious Affairs and Education, the Directorate of National Physical Education (D.E.F.A.) was established, granting Prefects the authority to found Physical Education associations. Based on this, on 3 May 1927, the National Physical Education Association of Lefkada "Tilikratis" was founded by the Prefecture of Preveza. Its official colors are red and blue, and its official crest features the capital letters Tau (T) and Lambda (L) (Tilikratis Lefkada) on the left side of the jersey.

The name (Ancient Greek: "he who holds a long spear") traces back to a historical figure of the island, active during the Peloponnesian War. It is conjectured—though Lefkadian historian Panos Rondogiannis expresses doubts—that he was a naval captain who distinguished himself in the Battle of Aegospotami (in late August 405 BC), where Athenian naval power was decisively destroyed. Tilikratis was depicted in one of the magnificent statues of the admirals, dedicated by the victors at Delphi following the battle.

== Players ==
=== Current squad ===
As of 4 January 2024

Note: Flags indicate national team as defined under FIFA eligibility rules; some limited exceptions apply. Players may hold more than one non-FIFA nationality.

No.	Pos.	Nation	Player
3	DF	GRE	Giannis Rizos
4	DF	GRE	Konstantinos Rougalas
5	MF	ARG	Tomás Pérez Serra (on loan from Tristán Suárez)
6	MF	ALB	Klajdi Toska
7	FW	GRE	Theodoros Peristeris
9	FW	FIN	Antti Ulmanen
10	MF	GRE	Konstantinos Tegousis
11	MF	GRE	Stathis Belevonis
12	MF	GRE	Lampros Souliotis
16	DF	GRE	Dimitrios Gianniotis

No.	Pos.	Nation	Player
17	DF	GRE	Konstantinos Zdravos-Rizos
18	FW	CIV	Manssour Fofana
19	DF	GRE	Spyros Katagis
21	DF	GRE	Okan Chatziterzoglou
23	MF	GRE	Georgios Spanoudakis
25	GK	GRE	Michalis Pardalos (on loan from Panetolikos)
27	MF	UKR	Yevgeniy Terzi
30	DF	GRE	Ilias Lazaridis (on loan from Panetolikos)
40	GK	GRE	Georgios Tzelepis
72	FW	GRE	Aristidis Kokkoris

== Honours ==
=== Domestic ===
League

- Third Division
  - Winners (2): 2017–18, 2022–23
- Fourth Division
  - Winners (1): 2010–11
- Preveza-Lefkada FCA First Division
  - Winners (5): 1982–83, 1987–88, 1996–97, 2004–05, 2015–16
- Epirus FCA First Division
  - Winners (3): 1966–67, 1969–70, 1974–75

Cup

- Preveza-Lefkada FCA Cup
  - Winners (11): 1987–88, 1989–90, 1998–99, 2009–10, 2010–11, 2017–18, 2018–19, 2021–22, 2022–23, 2024–25, 2025–26
- Preveza-Lefkada FCA Super Cup
  - Winners (2): 2018, 2026
- Epirus FCA Cup
  - Winners (1): 1973–74
