= Panelefsiniakos F.C. =

Panelefsiniakos
- Full name: Πανελευσινιακός Αθλητικός Όμιλος (Panelefsiniakos Athletic Club)
- Nickname: Stachyoforoi (Spikelets)
- Founded: 1931; 95 years ago
- Ground: Municipal Stadium of Elefsina
- Capacity: 1,800
- Chairman: Sofia Adam
- Manager: Georgios Marantas
- League: West Attica FCA First Division
- 2025–26: West Attica FCA First Division, 4th
- Website: https://paneleusiniakosao.gr/
Home colours	Away colours

Logo of the team (2015–2017)

Panelefsiniakos F.C. (Greek: Πανελευσινιακός Α.Ο.), the Panelefsiniakos Athletic Club, are a football club based in the city of Elefsina, Greece. The club currently competes in West Attica FCA First Division. The team was formed in 1931.

== History ==
Panelefsiniakos were formed in 1931. The club has played in the top level of Greek football, the Alpha Ethniki, three times (1961–62, 1967–68 and 1998–99), but was relegated after each season. The club has also played in the second level, Beta Ethniki, for 25 seasons.

After a series of relegations, the club has played for many years in the local West Attica championships. In 2013, the team promoted in the Football League 2 after 11 years. The new administrators of the team give hope for the future to the fans, signed experienced players from Football League and well-known players in Greece, such as Wellington Gonçalves and Ivan Rusev, who played for many years in the Super League.

== Stadium ==
The current stadium of Panelefsiniakos is the Municipal Stadium of Elefsina (capacity 1,800) located in Elefsina, which built in 1978 and opened in 1981. Next to the stadium, there is the fitness center, which constitutes a part of the athletic center. It also has seats for journalists and beaten path. The old stadium of the team was "Evangelos Doukas Stadium".

== Honours and achievements ==
- Football League

Winners (1): 1961 (Piraeus Group), 1967 (1st Group)

- Gamma Ethniki

Winners (1): 2015

- Association Football Clubs West Attica

Winners (3): 2004, 2009, 2012

- First Division of Piraeus Local Championship

Winners (1): 1961

- Second Division of Piraeus Local Championship

Winners (1): 1947

- Third Division of Piraeus Local Championship

Winners (1): 1946

== Professional history ==
- 3 seasons in Super League
- 29 seasons in Football League
- 14 seasons in Football League 2
- 7 seasons in Delta Ethniki
- 5 seasons in the Regional Leagues

== League history ==
- 1959 – 1961: Football League
- 1961 – 1962: Super League
- 1962 – 1967: Football League
- 1967 – 1968: Super League
- 1968 – 1983: Football League
- 1983 – 1988: Football League 2
- 1988 – 1989: Division 4
- 1989 – 1995: Football League 2
- 1995 – 1998: Football League
- 1998 – 1999: Super League
- 1999 – 2001: Football League
- 2001 – 2002: Football League 2
- 2002 – 2006: Division 4
- 2006 – 2008: Regional League
- 2008 – 2009: Division 4
- 2009 – 2012: Regional League
- 2012 – 2013: Division 4
- 2013 – 2015: Gamma Ethniki
- 2015 – 2017: Football League

== Notable former players ==
Greece

- (Greece) Giannis Kalitzakis
- (Greece) Thomas Kyparissis
- (Greece) Kostas Fragolias
- (Greece) Giorgos Barkoglou
- (Greece) Alekos Rantos
- (Greece) Manolis Psomas
- (Greece) Alexandros Kaklamanos
- (Greece) Giorgos Zacharopoulos
- (Greece) Nikolaos Platanos
- (Greece) Charalambos Ikonomopoulos
- (Greece) Lefteris Kouvidis
- (Greece) Ioannis Evangelatos

Foreign

- (Ukraine) Oleh Protasov
- (Romania) Silvian Cristescu
- (Ghana) Koffi Amponsah
- (Bulgaria) Ivan Rusev
- (Brazil) Wellington Gonçalves
