= PAS Preveza F.C. =

Preveza
- Full name: Ποδοσφαιρικός Αθλητικός Σύλλογος Πρέβεζας (Athletic Football Club of Preveza)
- Founded: 1963; 63 years ago
- Ground: Athanasia Tsoumeleka Municipal Stadium
- Capacity: 1,600
- Chairman: Giannis Tsotas
- Manager: Krzysztof Warzycha
- League: Gamma Ethniki
- 2025–26: Preveza-Lefkada FCA First Division, 1st (promoted)
- Website: https://pasprevezafc.gr/
Home colours	Away colours

P.A.S. Preveza (Greek: Ποδοσφαιρικός Αθλητικός Σύλλογος Πρέβεζα), Football Athletic Club of Preveza, is a football club based in Preveza in South-West Epirus, Greece. PAS Preveza was formed in 1963 as a result of the union of the two local teams – Nikopoli and AE Preveza. As emblem of the new team was chosen the hippocampus. The club have competed 2 times in Second Division. It also competed in third and fourth division.

== History ==
Established 1963 when A.E. Nikopolis and A.E. Preveza merged. P.A.S. Preveza was one of the founding members of the Second Division (Beta Ethniki Katigoria). Played for two years (1963–64 and 1969–70). Since then the club played between the Third Division (Gamma Ethniki) -11 times- and Fourth Division (D' Ethniki) or Amateur or Regional) -17 times- Categories of Greek football.

== Honours ==
=== Domestic ===
League

- Fourth Division
  - Winners (2): 1996–97, 2006–07
- Preveza-Lefkada FCA First Division
  - Winners (4): 1994–95, 2012–13, 2018–19, 2025–26
- Epirus FCA First Division
  - Winners (7): 1967–68, 1970–71, 1971–72, 1972–73, 1973–74, 1976–77, 1978–79

Cup

- Preveza-Lefkada FCA Cup
  - Winners (11): 1981–82, 1985–86, 1988–89, 1992–93, 1996–97, 1999–00, 2000–01, 2001–02, 2002–03, 2004–05, 2006–07
- Preveza-Lefkada FCA Super Cup
  - Winners (1): 2019
- Epirus FCA Cup
  - Winners (1): 1976–77

== Crest and colours ==
Club's emblem shows a hippocampus, which is the emblem of the city of Preveza. The colours of the club are yellow and black.

== Stadium ==
PAS Preveza play in the home ground, Athanasia Tsoumeleka Municipal Stadium.The capacity is 1600 seats.

== Former and present players ==
- Anastasiou Ioannis
- Balafas Demetrios
- Balavigias Sotirios
- Bellos Spyridon
- Biris Alexandros
- Chaidakis Spyridon
- Chasiotis Antonios
- Chatzivasiliades Vasilios
- Chavos Kosmas
- Chiras Theodoros
- Cholevas Christos
- Christodoulou Georgios
- Dimas Christos
- Dimas Thomas
- Dimoulias Konstantinos
- Eleftheriades Elias
- Fekkas Konstantinos
- Georgiades Lampros
- Georgopanis Nikolaos
- Giahritsis Loukas
- Giannos Georgios
- Gougoulis Konstantinos
- Iliadis Ioannis
- Jones Shalimar (NED)
- Kalaitzides Alexandros
- Kapouranis Thomas
- Kartsaklis Athanasios
- Kazoukas Ioannis
- Kouventaris Athanasios
- Lainas Konstantinos
- Lazaridis Demetrios
- Louskos Konstantinos
- Maglaras Konstantinos
- Maris Demetrios
- Markos Vasilios
- Masouras Panagiotis
- Milionis Athanasios
- Mitsios Eleftherios
- Moutsios Athanasios
- Paleogiannis Georgios
- Papadopoulos Panagiotis
- Papanikolou Nikolaos
- Pappas Demetrios
- Psomiades Michael
- Sihloimiris Alexandros
- Sinaides Panagiotis
- Siskas Vasilios
- Spyrakos Apostolos
- Tarasiades Vasilios
- Theologou Pantelis
- Tsoutsis Thomas
- Tzavaras Andreas
- Tzimas Konstantinos
- Vartziotis Christos
- Vestakis Eleftherios
- Vlahos Georgios
- Zachos Iosif
- Zois Ioannis

== Former and present coaches ==
- Dimoulitsas Thomas
- Gounaris Ioannis
- Leventakos Vasilios
- Xanthopoulos Vasilios
- Vassiliadis Thomas
- Panagiotidis Kiriakos
- Amarantos Kostas
