= Doxa Pentalofos M.A.S. =

Greek football club

- Full name: Morfotikos Athlitikos Syllogos Doxa Pentalofos
- Founded: 22 April 1973; 53 years ago
- Ground: Municipal Stadium Pentalofos; Pentalofos, Thessaloniki, Greece
- Capacity: 500
- Chairman: Maria Tsifouti
- Manager: Dimitris Galanos
- League: Macedonia FCA Third Division
- 2025–26: Macedonia FCA Third Division (Group 3), 3rd
- Website: http://doxapentalofoumas.blogspot.gr

Doxa Pentalofos M.A.S. is a Greek football club, based in Pentalofos, Thessaloniki.

The club was founded in 1973. They played in Football League 2 for the season 2013-14.
