= 2014–15 Gamma Ethniki Cup =

Tournament details
- Country: Greece
- Teams: 61

Final positions
- Champions: Trikala
- Runners-up: Ethnikos Piraeus

Tournament statistics
- Matches played: 60
- Goals scored: 169 (2.82 per match)

The 2014–15 Gamma Ethniki Cup was the second edition of the Gamma Ethniki Cup, a Greek football Cup competition, wherein only the clubs of the Football League 2 (the third tier of the Greek football league system) were allowed to participate. The Cup winner competed at the end of the season with the winner of the 2014–15 Amateurs' Cup for the 2015 Amateurs' Super Cup.

== First round ==
In first round of the competition, the clubs in each Group competed against each other in single matches (overtime and penalties applied) until two clubs were declared Group winners. The competing pairs were selected as a result of random drawing that took place on 5 September 2014. The match days of the first round were set on 28 September 2014 for Match-Day 1, 26 October 2014 for Match-Day 2 and 10 December 2014 for Match-Day 3.

== Group 1 ==
Location of teams in Group 1 of 2014-15 Football League 2

=== Match-day 1 ===
Team 1	Score	Team 2
Anagennisi Giannitsa	0 – 1	Vyzantio Kokkinochoma
Ethnikos Neo Agioneri	0 – 3	Kampaniakos
Kastoria	2 – 1	Evros Soufli
Kavala	1 – 0	Apollon Arnaia
Thyella Filotas	1 – 2	Aris
Ethnikos Alexandroupoli	1 – 0	Aris Akropotamos
Doxa Drama	0 – 1	Iraklis Ambelokipi
Orfeas Elefteroupoli	0 – 1 o.t.	Panserraikos

=== Match-day 2 ===
Team 1	Score	Team 2
Kampaniakos	3 – 2	Vyzantio Kokkinochoma
Ethnikos Alexandroupoli	3 – 3 (3 – 4 pen.)	Kavala
Panserraikos	1 – 0	Iraklis Ambelokipi
Aris	4 – 1	Kastoria

=== Match-day 3 ===
Team 1	Score	Team 2
Panserraikos	1 – 2	Aris
Kavala	1 – 0 o.t.	Kampaniakos

== Group 2 ==
Location of teams in Group 2 of 2014-15 Football League 2

=== Match-day 1 ===
Team 1	Score	Team 2
Pyrasos	0 – 0 (3 – 4 pen.)	Dotieas Agia
Ethnikos Filippiada	1 – 0 o.t.	Anagennisi Arta
Kozani	0 – 1	A.E. Karaiskakis
Achilleas Neokaisareia	2 – 2 (3 – 2 pen.)	Opountios
Vataniakos	1 – 2	Lefkadia
Thesprotos	1 – 0	Pyrsos Grevena
Trikala	1 – 0	Rigas Feraios
Makrochori	0 – 3	Oikonomos

=== Match-day 2 ===
Team 1	Score	Team 2
Lefkadia	1 – 3	Ethnikos Filippiada
Oikonomos	3 – 0	Thesprotos
Dotieas Agia	5 – 0	A.E. Karaiskakis
Achilleas Neokaisareia	1 – 2 o.t	Trikala

=== Match-day 3 ===
Team 1	Score	Team 2
Ethnikos Filippiada	0 – 1	Dotieas Agia
Oikonomos	1 – 2	Trikala

== Group 3 ==
Location of teams in Group 3 of 2014-15 Football League 2

=== Match-day 1 ===
Team 1	Score	Team 2
A.O.Loutraki	1 – 0	Mandraikos
Achaiki	0 – 4	Panelefsiniakos
Ermis Kiveri	3 – 1	Zakynthiakos
Doxa Nea Manolada	0 – 0 (7 – 6 pen.)	Vyzas
Panarkadikos	0 – 1	Panargiakos
PAO Varda	3 – 0	Asteras Magoula
A.O.Kymi	0 – 1	Kalamata

- Aiolikos passed without game to Match-day 2

=== Match-day 2 ===
Team 1	Score	Team 2
Doxa Nea Manolada	1 – 0	Aiolikos
A.O.Loutraki	4 – 1	PAO Varda
Panargiakos	1 – 0	Panelefsiniakos
Ermis Kiveri	1 – 6	Kalamata

=== Match-day 3 ===
Team 1	Score	Team 2
Panargiakos	0 – 1	A.O.Loutraki
Kalamata	3 – 5 o.t.	Doxa Nea Manolada

== Group 4 ==
Location of teams in Group 4 of 2014-15 Football League 2

=== Match-day 1 ===
Team 1	Score	Team 2
Giouchtas	0 – 5	Asteras Vari
Ilisiakos	1 – 2	Ionikos
Kissamikos	1 – 3	A.O.Nea Ionia
Anagennisi Ierapetra	1 – 3	Ethnikos Piraeus
P.A.O. Krousonas	2 – 3	Atromitos Piraeus
Irodotos	0 – 1	A.E. Kifisia
Glyfada	1 – 2	Triglia Rafina

=== Match-day 2 ===
Team 1	Score	Team 2
Ionikos	2 – 2 (5 – 6 pen.)	Triglia Rafina
Asteras Vari	2 – 2 (1 – 4 pen.)	A.E. Kifisia
Ethnikos Piraeus	2 – 0	A.O.Nea Ionia

- Atromitos Piraeus passed without game to Match-day 3

=== Match-day 3 ===
Team 1	Score	Team 2
Atromitos Piraeus	0 – 1	A.E. Kifisia
Triglia Rafina	0 – 1 o.t.	Ethnikos Piraeus

== Bracket ==
Quarter-finals
14 January 2015 – Thessaloniki
Aris	0
Dotieas Agia	1
14 January 2015 – Trikala
Trikala	4
Kavala	2
14 January 2015 – Piraeus
Ethnikos Piraeus	2
Doxa Nea Manolada	1
14 January 2015 – Kifisia
A.E. Kifisia	1
A.O.Loutraki	0

Semi-finals
25 February 2015 – Trikala
Dotieas Agia	0
Trikala	5
25 February 2015 – Kifisia
Ethnikos Piraeus (p)	3 (5)
A.E. Kifisia	3 (3)

Final
21 March 2015 – Amfissa
Trikala	3
Ethnikos Piraeus	2

== Quarter-finals ==
In the second round of the competition (quarter-finals), the 8 Group winners competed against each other in single knock-out matches at the home ground of the club favored by the draw. All matches were held on 14 January 2015.

14 January 2015

Aris	0 – 1	Dotieas Agia
	Report	Tsatsalidis 48'

Kleanthis Vikelidis Stadium, Thessaloniki
Referee: Dimitrios Karaterpos (Kozani)

14 January 2015

Trikala	4 – 2	Kavala
Sachinidis 8'; Kablionis 10'; Moschakis 43', 82'	Report	Papadopoulos 53', 67'

Trikala Municipal Stadium, Trikala
Referee: Charalambos Athanasiou (Arta)

14 January 2015

Ethnikos Piraeus	2 – 1	Doxa Nea Manolada
Stafshulai 83'; Togrou 87'	Report	Nikolopoulos 68'

Municipal Stadium of Moschato, Moschato
Referee: Georgios Lambrou (Euboea)

14 January 2015

A.E. Kifisia	1 – 0	A.O.Loutraki
Goutsoulas 83'	Report

Zirineio Stadium, Kifissia, Athens
Referee: Antonis Gotsopoulos (Achaea)

== Semi-finals ==
In the third round of the competition (semi-finals), the four clubs advancing from the Quarter-finals competed in single knockout matches at the home ground of the club favored by the draw. The two winners advanced to the final. Both matches were held on 25 February 2015.

25 February 2015

Trikala	5 – 0	Dotieas Agia
Sachinidis 10', 29'; Keri 20'; Kablionis 75'; Vangjeli 78' (pen.)	Report

Trikala Municipal Stadium, Trikala
Referee: Aristides Limboudis (Macedonia)

25 February 2015

A.E. Kifisia	3 – 3 (a.e.t.)	Ethnikos Piraeus
Goutsoulas 5', 78'; Drimousis 90'	Report	Gorogias 10'; Veletis 62'; Dorovinis 74' (pen.)
Penalties
Kolotouros (penalty scored); Matsoukas (penalty scored); Thanopoulos (penalty scored); Goutsoulas (penalty missed)	3 – 5	(penalty scored) Souflas; (penalty scored) Dorovinis; (penalty scored) Pavlopoulos; (penalty scored) Bena; (penalty scored) Goulas

Zirineio Stadium, Kifissia, Athens
Referee: Evangelos Manouchos (Argolida)

== Final ==
21 March 2015

Trikala	3 – 2	Ethnikos Piraeus
Makris 10' (o.g.); Vangjeli 51' (pen.), 60'	Report	Souflas 39' (pen.), 84'

Amfissa Municipal Stadium
Referee: Georgios Tzovaras (Phthiotis)

Trikala	Ethnikos

Trikala:
GK	?	(Greece) Vaios Ntaskas
DF	?	(Greece) Vangelis Koutsopoulos	(yellow card) 62'
DF	?	(Greece) Athanasios Tellos
DF	?	(Greece) Konstantinos Skoupras	(yellow card) 32'
DF	?	(Greece) Antonis Kablionis	(substituted off) 100'
MF	?	(Greece) Panagiotis Papaefthimiou
MF	?	(Serbia) Stefan Spasic
MF	?	(Albania) Pavli Vangjeli
MF	?	(Greece) Georgios Moschakis	(substituted off) 73'
FW	?	(Albania) Florenc Keri
FW	?	(Greece) Vasilios Sachinidis	(substituted off) 82'
Substitutes:
MF	?	(Greece) Christos Zygeridis	(substituted in) 73'
MF	?	(Greece) Vasilios Mpasiakas	(substituted in) 100'
FW	?	(Greece) Christos Pentsas	(substituted in) 82'
Manager:
(Greece) Periklis Amanatidis

Ethnikos:
GK	?	(Greece) Vasilios Voutsinas
DF	?	(Greece) Athanasios Gerolymos
DF	?	(Greece) Panagiotis Makris
DF	?	(Greece) Athanasios Koukoulis
DF	?	(Greece) Efthimios Pavlakis
DF	?	(Greece) Vasilios Chalkias	(yellow card) 52'	(substituted off) 64'
MF	?	(Greece) Georgios Goulas	(substituted off) 75'
MF	?	(Greece) Spyros Dorovinis
MF	?	(Greece) Alexandros Souflas
FW	?	(Greece) Georgios Manalis	(yellow card) 104'
FW	?	(Greece) Manolis Lygos	(substituted off) 72'
Substitutes:
FW	?	(Albania) Apostolos Stafshulai	(substituted in) 64'
MF	?	(Greece) Georgios Yfantis	(substituted in) 75'
FW	?	(Greece) Panagiotis Pavlopoulos	(substituted in) 72'	(yellow card) 105'
Manager:
(Greece) Thymios Georgoulis

Match officials

- Assistant referees:
  - Chrisros Doskoris (Phthiotis)
  - Anestis Doudoumis (Phthiotis)
- Fourth official: Chrysovalantis Vrakas (Euboea)

Match rules

- 90 minutes.
- 30 minutes of extra-time if necessary.
- Penalty shoot-out if scores still level.
- Seven named substitutes.
- Maximum of three substitutions.

Gamma Ethniki Cup 2015

Trikala
1st Title
