= 2014–15 Amateurs' Super Cup Greece =

2015 Amateurs' Super Cup Greece
Nestos Chrysoupoli	Trikala
3	0
- Date: 6 June 2015
- Venue: Aiginio Municipal Stadium, Aiginio
- Referee: Panagiotis Simeonidis
- Weather: Clear; 27 °C (81 °F)

The 2015 Amateurs' Super Cup was the 2nd edition of the Greek Amateurs' Super Cup, an annual Greek football match played between the winner of the previous season's Gamma Ethniki Cup and the winner of the Amateur Cup.

The match was contested by Trikala, winners of the 2014–15 Football League 2 Cup, and Nestos Chrysoupoli, the 2014–15 Greek Amateurs' Cup winners. Despite being considered the outsider, Nestos Chrysoupoli triumphantly won the match 3 − 0. This was in total the fourth trophy won by the club for the 2014–15 season, as Nestos had previously won the Kavala Football Clubs Association Championship and Cup double, along with the Greek Football Amateur Cup.

== Details ==
6 June 2015
18:00 EET

Nestos Chrysoupoli	3 – 0	Trikala
Hasanoglu 2'; Sterev 53'; Kutev 62'	Report

Aiginio Municipal Stadium, Aiginio
Referee: Panagiotis Simeonidis (Pieria)

Nestos	Trikala

GK	?	(Greece) Theodoros Karavelidis
DF	?	(Bulgaria) Nikolai Sterev	(yellow card) 11'
DF	?	(Greece) Aggelos Pavlakis	(yellow card) 24' (yellow-red card) 45+2'
DF	?	(Greece) Dimos Gavrelis	(yellow card) 67'
MF	?	(Greece) Theodoros Siamatas
MF	?	(Greece) Konstantinos Papadatos
MF	?	(Albania) Enea Gaqollari	(substituted off) 35'
MF	?	(Greece) Anastasios Desylas
MF	?	(Greece) Recep Hasanoglu	(substituted off) 77'
FW	?	(Greece) Antonios Machairoudis	(substituted off) 46'
FW	?	(Bulgaria) Daniel Kutev
Substitutes:
MF	?	(Greece) Thomas Tsekos	(substituted in) 77'
DF	?	(Greece) Konstantinos Manoukos	(substituted in) 46'
FW	?	(Greece) Antonios Squri	(substituted in) 35'
Manager:
(Greece) Nikos Karampetakis

GK	?	(Greece) Vaios Ntaskas
DF	?	(Greece) Vangelis Koutsopoulos	(substituted off) 11'
DF	?	(Greece) Athanasios Tellos	(yellow card) 45'
DF	?	(Greece) Konstantinos Skoupras	(yellow card) 31'
DF	?	(Greece) Antonis Kablionis
DF	?	(Greece) Konstantinos Giotas
MF	?	(Serbia) Stefan Spasić	(substituted off) 46'
MF	?	(Albania) Pavli Vangjeli	(yellow card) 64'	(substituted off) 77'
MF	?	(Greece) Georgios Moschakis
FW	?	(Albania) Florenc Keri
FW	?	(Greece) Vasilios Sachinidis	(yellow card) 9'
Substitutes:
MF	?	(Greece) Panagiotis Papaefthimiou	(substituted in) 11'
FW	?	(Greece) Periklis Minas	(substituted in) 77'
FW	?	(Greece) Christos Pentsas	(substituted in) 46'
Manager:
(Greece) Periklis Amanatidis

Match officials:

- Assistant referees:
  - Stefanos Parasiou (Imathia)
  - Stavros Sipkas (Pieria)
- Fourth official: Labros Papargyriou (Pieria)

Match rules

- 90 minutes
- 30 minutes extra-time if the scores still level
- Penalty shoot-out if scores still level
- Six named substitutes, of which three may be used

2015 Amateurs' Super Cup

Nestos Chrysoupoli
1st Title
