= 2009–10 Super League Greece =

74th season of top-tier football league in Greece

Super League Greece
- Season: 2009–10
- Dates: 22 August 2009 – 11 April 2010
- Champions: Panathinaikos; 20th Greek title
- Relegated: Levadiakos; PAS Giannina; Panthrakikos
- Champions League: Panathinaikos; PAOK
- Europa League: AEK Athens; Aris; Olympiacos
- Matches: 252
- Goals: 587 (2.33 per match)
- Top goalscorer: Djibril Cissé (23 goals)
- Biggest home win: Olympiacos 5–1 Levadiakos; Ergotelis 4–0 Panthrakikos; Panathinaikos 4–0 AEL; Panathinaikos 4–0 PAS Giannina
- Biggest away win: Asteras Tripolis 0–4 Iraklis
- Highest scoring: Skoda Xanthi 4–3 Iraklis; Ergotelis 4–3 Asteras Tripolis
- Longest unbeaten run: PAOK (12 matches)

The 2009–10 Super League Greece was the 74th season of the highest football league of Greece and the fourth under the name Super League. The league consisted of 16 teams. Participants are the 13 best teams from the 2008–09 season and three teams that have been promoted from the Beta Ethniki. On 11 April 2010, Panathinaikos defeated Iraklis 2–0 to secure their 20th Greek title and their first one in six years.

== Teams ==
Promoted from 2008–09 Beta Ethniki	Relegated from 2008–09 Super League Greece
Atromitos; PAS Giannina; Kavala	OFI; Panserraikos; Thrasyvoulos

=== Other changes ===
Due to Greece having ascended in the UEFA league coefficient rankings, the 2009–10 champions will enter 2010–11 UEFA Champions League at the group stage instead of the third qualifying round. Every other European spot remains unchanged, meaning that the winner of the European play-off group will reach the third qualifying round of the Champions League while the runners-up and third-placed team of this group will enter 2010–11 UEFA Europa League.

=== Stadiums and locations ===
Location of the 2009–10 Super League Greece teams

Club	Location	Venue	Capacity	2008–09
AEK Athens	Athens (Marousi)	Athens Olympic Stadium	69,638	3rd
AEL	Larissa	Alcazar Stadium	13,108	5th
Aris	Thessaloniki (Charilaou)	Kleanthis Vikelidis Stadium	22,800	6th
Asteras Tripolis	Tripoli	Asteras Tripolis Stadium	6,430	12th
Atromitos	Athens (Peristeri)	Peristeri Stadium	8,939	1st (BE)
Ergotelis	Heraklion	Pankritio Stadium	26,240	9th
Iraklis	Thessaloniki (Triandria)	Kaftanzoglio Stadium	27,560	10th
Kavala	Kavala	Anthi Karagianni Stadium	12,500	3rd (BE)
Levadiakos	Livadeia	Levadia Municipal Stadium	5,915	13rd
Olympiacos	Piraeus	Karaiskakis Stadium	33,334	1st
Panathinaikos	Athens (Marousi)	Athens Olympic Stadium	69,638	2nd
Panionios	Athens (Nea Smyrni)	Nea Smyrni Stadium	11,700	8th
Panthrakikos	Komotini	Komotini Municipal Stadium	6,500	11th
PAOK	Thessaloniki (Toumba)	Toumba Stadium	28,703	4th
PAS Giannina	Ioannina	Zosimades Stadium	7,652	2nd (BE)
Skoda Xanthi	Xanthi	Skoda Xanthi Arena	7,361	7th

=== Personnel and kits ===
Team	Manager	Captain	Kit manufacturer	Shirt sponsor
AEK Athens	(Bosnia and Herzegovina) Dušan Bajević	(Greece) Pantelis Kafes	Puma	Diners Club
AEL	(Greece) Marinos Ouzounidis	(Greece) Nikos Dabizas	Adidas	On Telecoms
Aris	(Argentina) Héctor Cúper	(Spain) Sergio Koke	Reebok	EKO
Asteras Tripolis	(Argentina) Mario Gómez	(Greece) Nikolaos Lazaridis	Lotto	OPAP
Atromitos	(Greece) Georgios Donis	(Greece) Chrysostomos Michailidis	Asics	OPAP
Ergotelis	(Greece) Nikos Karageorgiou	(Brazil) Silva Júnior	Lotto	OPAP
Iraklis	(Slovakia) Jozef Bubenko	(Greece) Anastasios Katsabis	Puma	Attica Bank
Kavala	(Netherlands) Aad de Mos	(Montenegro) Siniša Dobrašinović	Puma	OPAP
Levadiakos	(Spain) Quique Hernández	(Greece) Georgios Zisopoulos	Puma	OPAP
Olympiacos	(Montenegro) Božidar Bandović	(Greece) Antonios Nikopolidis	Puma	Citibank
Panathinaikos	(Greece) Nikos Nioplias	(Greece) Giorgos Karagounis	Adidas	Cosmote
Panionios	(Greece) Akis Mantzios	(Greece) Giannis Maniatis	Diadora	WIND
Panthrakikos	(Greece) Pavlos Dermitzakis	(Greece) Nikolaos Bacharidis	Umbro	OPAP
PAOK	(Portugal) Fernando Santos	(Portugal) Sérgio Conceição	Puma	DEPA
PAS Giannina	(Greece) Nikos Anastopoulos	(Greece) Georgios Dasios	Umbro	Zagori
Skoda Xanthi	(Greece) Ioannis Matzourakis	(Greece) Giannis Papadimitriou	Hummel	Emporiki Bank

=== Managerial changes ===
Team	Outgoing manager	Manner of departure	Date of vacancy	Replaced by	Date of appointment
Panthrakikos	(Romania) Ilie Dumitrescu	Sacked	27 August 2009	(France) Albert Cartier	27 August 2009
Olympiacos	(Georgia (country)) Temuri Ketsbaia	Sacked	14 September 2009	(Brazil) Zico	16 September 2009
Skoda Xanthi	(Germany) Wolfgang Wolf	Mutual consent	15 September 2009	(Greece) Ioannis Matzourakis	21 September 2009
Levadiakos	(Serbia) Momčilo Vukotić	Mutual consent	23 September 2009	(Spain) Quique Hernández	30 September 2009
Asteras Tripolis	(Argentina) Mario Gómez	Mutual consent	25 October 2009	(Greece) Vangelis Vlachos	25 October 2009
Iraklis	(Ukraine) Oleh Protasov	Mutual consent	30 October 2009	(Greece) Savvas Kofidis	30 October 2009
Aris	(Brazil) Mazinho	Mutual consent	2 November 2009	(Argentina) Héctor Cúper	6 November 2009
Kavala	(Greece) Giannis Papakostas	Mutual consent	14 November 2009	(Greece) Vangelis Goutis	15 November 2009
PAS Giannina	(Greece) Georgios Paraschos	Mutual consent	7 December 2009	(Greece) Nikos Anastopoulos	13 January 2010
Panathinaikos	(Netherlands) Henk ten Cate	Sacked	8 December 2009	(Greece) Nikos Nioplias	8 December 2009
Panthrakikos	(France) Albert Cartier	Mutual consent	11 January 2010	(Greece) Pavlos Dermitzakis	12 January 2010
Iraklis	(Greece) Savvas Kofidis	Sacked	24 January 2010	(Slovakia) Jozef Bubenko	25 January 2010
Panionios	(Belgium) Emilio Ferrera	Mutual consent	25 January 2010	(Greece) Akis Mantzios	29 January 2010
Olympiacos	(Brazil) Zico	Sacked	19 January 2010	(Montenegro) Božidar Bandović	19 January 2010
Kavala	(Greece) Vangelis Goutis	Mutual consent	25 January 2010	(Netherlands) Aad De Mos	28 January 2010
Panionios	(Greece) Akis Mantzios	Sacked	3 February 2010	(Greece) Georgios Paraschos	3 February 2010
Skoda Xanthi	(Greece) Ioannis Matzourakis	Sacked	22 February 2010	(Greece) Nikos Kehagias	23 February 2010
AEL	(Greece) Marinos Ouzounidis	Mutual Consent	22 February 2010	(Greece) Giannis Papakostas	22 February 2010

== Regular season ==
=== League table ===
Pos	Team	Pld	W	D	L	GF	GA	GD	Pts	Qualification or relegation
1	Panathinaikos (C)	30	22	4	4	54	17	+37	70	Qualification for the Champions League group stage
2	Olympiacos	30	19	7	4	47	18	+29	64	Qualification for the Play-offs
3	PAOK	30	19	5	6	41	16	+25	62	Qualification for the Play-offs
4	AEK Athens	30	15	8	7	43	31	+12	53	Qualification for the Play-offs
5	Aris	30	12	10	8	35	28	+7	46	Qualification for the Play-offs
6	Kavala	30	10	9	11	31	32	−1	39	
7	Atromitos	30	10	8	12	34	36	−2	38	
8	AEL	30	10	7	13	31	42	−11	37 (Note: Head-to-head points: Larissa 7, Panionios 5, Iraklis 4.)	
9	Panionios	30	9	10	11	34	35	−1	37	
10	Iraklis	30	10	7	13	39	41	−2	37	
11	Ergotelis	30	9	9	12	37	41	−4	36 (Note: Head-to-head points: Ergotelis 6, Asteras Tripolis 0.)	
12	Asteras Tripolis	30	10	6	14	29	36	−7	36	
13	Skoda Xanthi	30	10	5	15	27	36	−9	35	
14	Levadiakos (R)	30	9	7	14	31	44	−13	34	Relegation to the Football League
15	PAS Giannina (R)	30	7	7	16	27	46	−19	28	Relegation to the Football League
16	Panthrakikos (R)	30	3	3	24	21	62	−41	12	Relegation to the Football League

Source: Super League Greece
Rules for classification: 1) Points; 2) Head-to-head points; 3) Head-to-head goal difference; 4) Play-offs (neutral ground).
(Note: Criterion 4 is only used if needed to decide champion, teams for relegation or teams for UEFA competitions).
(C) Champions; (R) Relegated

=== Results ===
Home \ Away	AEK	AEL	ARIS	AST	ATR	ERG	IRA	KAV	LEV	OLY	PAO	PGSS	PNT	PAOK	PAS	XAN
AEK Athens		3–1	1–0	2–0	3–3	1–0	1–0	3–0	3–2	1–2	0–1	1–1	3–2	1–0	3–1	3–1
AEL	1–0		2–2	1–0	2–2	1–0	2–1	1–0	1–2	0–2	0–3	2–2	0–2	2–1	0–0	2–0
Aris	1–1	2–0		0–1	1–0	2–1	4–2	0–0	1–0	1–0	0–0	1–1	0–2	2–0	1–0	1–0
Asteras Tripolis	2–0	0–0	2–1		1–2	2–4	0–4	1–0	2–1	1–3	0–1	2–0	3–1	1–1	3–0	0–0
Atromitos	0–1	2–1	0–3	0–0		0–0	2–1	2–0	3–0	0–1	0–3	1–0	3–1	0–0	2–1	1–0
Ergotelis	2–2	0–0	0–0	4–3	1–1		1–3	1–0	1–0	1–1	0–3	0–0	4–0	0–2	3–1	1–0
Iraklis	1–1	2–1	2–2	1–0	2–2	0–2		1–0	1–1	1–0	0–1	0–2	3–1	1–1	2–0	2–4
Kavala	2–1	3–3	1–1	0–1	2–1	1–3	1–0		2–2	0–0	2–2	1–1	3–0	0–0	1–0	2–1
Levadiakos	0–0	3–0	0–2	1–0	1–1	2–2	1–0	0–1		0–3	0–2	1–0	2–0	0–2	4–1	2–1
Olympiacos	1–2	2–1	2–1	3–0	2–0	2–1	1–1	0–0	5–1		2–0	1–0	3–0	0–1	2–2	0–0
Panathinaikos	1–1	4–0	2–1	1–1	3–1	4–1	2–0	0–2	3–0	0–1		2–1	2–0	2–1	4–0	1–0
Panionios	3–1	0–3	1–1	1–3	2–1	1–1	0–0	1–2	2–2	0–1	0–2		3–1	0–0	3–1	3–0
Panthrakikos	1–2	1–3	1–1	0–0	0–3	3–2	1–2	1–3	0–2	0–2	0–1	0–1		1–2	1–2	1–1
PAOK	0–1	1–0	4–1	1–0	1–0	4–1	1–0	1–0	3–0	1–2	2–1	1–0	3–0		2–0	1–0
PAS Giannina	1–1	2–0	0–1	1–0	1–0	1–0	2–3	2–1	1–1	2–2	0–1	2–3	2–0	0–1		0–0
Skoda Xanthi	1–0	0–1	2–1	2–0	2–1	1–0	4–3	2–1	1–0	0–1	1–2	1–2	1–0	0–3	1–1	

Source: Super League Greece
Legend: Blue = home team win; Yellow = draw; Red = away team win.

== Play-offs ==
In the play-off for Champions League, the teams play each other in a home and away round robin. However, they do not all start with 0 points. Instead, a weighting system applies to the teams' standing at the start of the play-off mini-league. The team finishing fifth in the Super League will start the play-off with 0 points. The fifth placed team's end of season tally of points is subtracted from the sum of the points that other teams have. This number is then divided by five to give the other teams the points with which they start the mini-league.

The teams started the play-offs with the following number of points:

- Olympiacos – 4 points ((64–46) / 5 = 3.6, rounded up to 4)
- PAOK – 3 points ((62–46) / 5 = 3.2, rounded to 3)
- AEK Athens – 1 point ((53–46) / 5 = 1.4, rounded to 1)
- Aris – 0 points ((46–46) / 5 = 0)

Pos	Team	Pld	W	D	L	GF	GA	GD	Pts	Qualification	PAOK	AEK	ARIS	OLY
2	PAOK	6	4	1	1	7	3	+4	16	Qualification for the Champions League third qualifying round		1–0	2–0	1–0
3	AEK Athens	6	2	2	2	8	7	+1	9	Qualification for the Europa League play-off round (Note: Since Aris lost the 2009–10 Greek Football Cup Final against Champions League-qualified Panathinaikos, all Europa League spots will be determined by the play-off group positions.)	0–0		4–2	2–1
4	Aris	6	2	2	2	8	9	−1	8 (Note: Head-to-head record: Aris–Olympiacos 2–0, Olympiacos–Aris 0–0.)	Qualification for the Europa League third qualifying round	3–2	1–1		2–0
5	Olympiacos	6	1	1	4	3	7	−4	8	Qualification for the Europa League second qualifying round	0–1	2–1	0–0	

Source: Super League Greece: Standings and Schedule
Legend: Blue = home team win; Yellow = draw; Red = away team win.
Rules for classification: 1) points; 2) head-to-head points; 3) head-to-head goal difference; 4) head-to-head goals scored; 5) goal difference; 6) number of goals scored.

== Top scorers ==
Source: Galanis Sports Data

Rank	Player	Club	Goals
1	(France) Djibril Cissé	Panathinaikos	23
2	(Greece) Giorgos Barkoglou	Levadiakos	11
2	(Romania) Victoraș Iacob	Iraklis	11
2	(Argentina) Javier Cámpora	Aris	11
5	(Nigeria) Benjamin Onwuachi	Kavala	10
5	(Croatia) Danijel Cesarec	Asteras Tripolis	10
7	(Greece) Kostas Mitroglou	Olympiacos	9
8	(Greece) Ilias Anastasakos	Atromitos	8
8	(Argentina) Emanuel Perrone	Atromitos	8
8	(Croatia) Boško Balaban	Panionios	8
8	(Argentina) Ismael Blanco	AEK Athens	8
8	(Argentina) Ignacio Scocco	AEK Athens	8
8	(Greece) Kostas Katsouranis	Panathinaikos	8

== Awards ==
=== MVP and Best Goal Awards ===
Matchday	MVP	Best Goal	Ref
1st	(Greece) Vasilis Torosidis (Olympiacos)		
2nd	(Hungary) Krisztián Németh (AEK Athens)	(Italy) Enzo Maresca (Olympiacos)	
3rd	(Argentina) Sebastián Leto (Panathinaikos)	(Greece) Georgios Fotakis (PAOK)	
4th	(Greece) Vasilis Torosidis (Olympiacos)	(Portugal) Vieirinha (PAOK)	
5th	(Nigeria) Wilson Oruma (Kavala)	(Uruguay) Sebastián Abreu (Aris)	
6th	(Greece) Dimitrios Eleftheropoulos (PAS Giannina)	(Greece) Kostas Katsouranis (Panathinaikos)	
7th	(Argentina) Ignacio Scocco (AEK Athens)	(Nigeria) Benjamin Onwuachi (Kavala)	
8th	(Greece) Kostas Katsouranis (Panathinaikos)		
9th	(France) Djibril Cissé (Panathinaikos)	(Greece) Stefanos Siontis (Kavala)	
10th	(Greece) Apostolos Vellios (Iraklis)	(Croatia) Boško Balaban (Panionios)	
11th	(Greece) Apostolos Giannou (Kavala)	(France) Bertrand Robert (Panthrakikos)	
12th	(Argentina) Ignacio Scocco (AEK Athens)	(Brazil) Luiz Brito (Atromitos)	
13th	(Spain) Toni Calvo (Aris)	(Greece) Kostas Katsouranis (Panathinaikos)	
14th	(Greece) Sotiris Ninis (Panathinaikos)	(Argentina) Lucas Favalli (Atromitos)	
15th	(Greece) Giannis Taralidis (Levadiakos)	(France) Djibril Cissé (Panathinaikos)	
16th	(Argentina) Ignacio Scocco (AEK Athens)	(Greece) Stelios Iliadis (Iraklis)	
17th	(Argentina) Emanuel Perrone (Atromitos)	(Spain) Toni Calvo (Aris)	
18th	(Greece) Michalis Sifakis (Aris)	(Greece) Giorgos Karagounis (Panathinaikos)	
19th	(Serbia) Vladan Ivić (PAOK)	(Greece) Dimitrios Giantsis (Iraklis)	
20th	(Slovenia) Mirnes Šišić (PAS Giannina)	(Argentina) Ignacio Scocco (AEK Athens)	
21st	(Argentina) Ismael Blanco (AEK Athens)	(France) Djibril Cissé (Panathinaikos)	
22nd	(Brazil) Diogo Rincón (Kavala)	(Argentina) Ignacio Scocco (AEK Athens)	
23rd	(Nigeria) Benjamin Onwuachi (Kavala)	(Uruguay) Pablo García (PAOK)	
24th	(Portugal) Vieirinha (PAOK)	(Tunisia) Mehdi Nafti (Aris)	
25th	(Greece) Georgios Tzavellas (Panionios)	(Ivory Coast) Serge Dié (Iraklis)	
26th	(Argentina) Javier Cámpora (Aris)	(Greece) Giorgos Karagounis (Panathinaikos)	
27th	(Greece) Grigoris Papazacharias (Iraklis)	(Greece) Dimitrios Souanis (Skoda Xanthi)	
28th	(Greece) Sotiris Ninis (Panathinaikos)	(Argentina) Ignacio Scocco (AEK Athens)	
29th	(Greece) Loukas Vyntra (Panathinaikos)	(Greece) Sotiris Ninis (Panathinaikos)	
30th	(Bosnia and Herzegovina) Zlatan Muslimović (PAOK)	(Greece) Giannis Karalis (Atromitos)	

=== Annual awards ===
Annual awards were announced on 20 December 2010.

Award	Winner	Club
Greek Player of the Season	(Greece) Vasilis Torosidis	Olympiacos
Foreign Player of the Season	(France) Djibril Cissé	Panathinaikos
Young Player of the Season	(Greece) Sotiris Ninis	Panathinaikos
Goalkeeper of the Season	(Greece) Michalis Sifakis	Aris
Golden Boot	(France) Djibril Cissé	Panathinaikos
Manager of the Season	(Portugal) Fernando Santos	PAOK

== Attendances ==
Panathinaikos drew the highest average home attendance in the 2009–10 edition of the Super League Greece.

#	Team	Average attendance
1	Panathinaikos	27,531
2	Olympiacos	19,666
3	PAOK	17,486
4	AEK Athens	13,136
5	Aris	12,073
6	PAS Giannina	4,726
7	Iraklis	4,196
8	Panthrakikos	3,536
9	AEL	3,360
10	Panionios	3,162
11	Kavala	3,084
12	Ergotelis	2,209
13	Atromitos	2,054
14	Asteras Tripolis	1,837
15	Skoda Xanthi	1,782
16	Levadiakos	1,753
