= Nikos Gidopoulos =

Greek footballer

Personal information
- Full name: Nikolaos Gidopoulos
- Date of birth: 26 July 1995 (age 31)
- Place of birth: Trikala, Thessaly, Greece
- Height: 1.90 m (6 ft 3 in)
- Position: Goalkeeper

Team information
- Current team: SV Dessau 05

Youth career
- 2006–2012: AO Dimitra Apollon 2005
- 2012–2013: Skoda Xanthi
- 2013–2014: AO Dimitra Apollon 2005

Senior career*
Years	Team	Apps	(Gls)
2014–2016	Trikala	2	(0)
2016–2017	Mavri Aeti Eleftherochoriou	15	(0)
2017–2018	Ialysos	0	(0)
2018–2019	Trikala	7	(0)
2019–2020	Olympiacos Volos	16	(0)
2020–	SV Dessau 05	0	(0)
- * Club domestic league appearances and goals as of 8 March 2020

Nikos Gidopoulos (Greek: Νίκος Γιδόπουλος; born 26 July 1995) is a Greek professional footballer who plays as a goalkeeper for German club SV Dessau 05.

== Honours ==
Trikala

- Gamma Ethniki: 2014–15
- Gamma Ethniki Cup: 2014–15
