= Nikos Pantelis =

Greek footballer and manager

Personal information
- Full name: Nikolaos Pantelis
- Date of birth: 6 October 1959 (age 67)
- Place of birth: Athens, Greece
- Height: 1.84 m (6 ft 0 in)
- Position: Defender

Senior career*
Years	Team	Apps	(Gls)
1977–1981	Panionios	36	(2)
1981–1985	Egaleo	38	(3)
1985–1986	Athinaikos		

Managerial career
- 1996: Kerkyra
- 1997–1998: Athinaikos
- 1998–1999: Keratsini
- 2000–2001: Lamia
- 2001–2003: Athinaikos
- 2004–2005: Ilisiakos
- 2005: Panionios
- 2005–2007: Agios Dimitrios
- 2007–2008: Kallithea
- 2008–2009: Kerkyra
- 2009–2010: Ilioupoli
- 2010–2011: Ethnikos Asteras
- 2011: Ethnikos Piraeus
- 2011: Vyzas Megara
- 2011–2012: Kallithea
- 2013: Glyfada
- 2013: Iraklis Psachna
- 2013–2014: Panionios
- 2014: Paniliakos
- 2014: Olympiacos Volos
- 2014–2015: Kallithea
- 2016: Panargiakos
- 2016–2017: Fostiras
- 2017: AO Chania
- 2017–2018: Diagoras
- 2018: Kallithea
- 2018: Diagoras
- 2018–2019: Kallithea
- 2020: Ialysos
- 2020–2022: Santorini
- 2022–2023: Ilioupoli
- 2023–2024: Egaleo
- 2024: Ilioupoli
- 2024: Aris Petroupoli
- 2024–2025: Ethnikos Piraeus
- 2025–2026: Ethnikos Piraeus
- 2026: Acharnaikos
- * Club domestic league appearances and goals

Nikos Pantelis (Greek: Νίκος Παντέλης; born 6 October 1959) is a Greek professional football manager and former player.

== Career ==
Born in Athens, Pantelis began playing football as a defender for Panionios, making 36 Alpha Ethniki appearances during his time with the club. In 1981, he signed with Egaleo, where he would make a further 38 Alpha Ethniki appearances over a four-year spell.

After he retired from playing, Pantelis became a football coach. He was first appointed manager by Kerkyra in 1996. He managed several Greek second and third level clubs over the following 15 years. Pantelis did manage Alpha Ethniki side Panionios for three matches in 2005.

In June 2011, Pantelis was arrested during a probe into match-fixing when he was manager of Ethnikos Asteras F.C., and the Football League imposed a two-year ban. However, Pantelis appealed and was found innocent by the Football League's Disciplinary Committee.

Pantelis was appointed manager of Kallithea for a second time in December 2011 following the unexpected departure of Vangelis Goutis.
