= Masengo Ilunga =

Congolese footballer (born 1957)

Personal information
- Date of birth: 12 June 1957 (age 69)
- Place of birth: Belgian Congo
- Position: Midfielder

Senior career*
Years	Team	Apps	(Gls)
1976–1982	TP Mazembe		
1982–1988	Ethnikos Piraeus	151	(12)
1988–1989	Enosis Neon Paralimni		

International career
1976–1981	Zaire	8	(0)
- * Club domestic league appearances and goals

Masengo Ilunga (born 12 June 1957) is a Congolese former professional footballer who played as a midfielder for club sides in Zaire, Greece and Cyprus.

== Club career ==
Ilunga began playing football with TP Mazembe. He moved to Greece in July 1982, joining Greek first division side Ethnikos Piraeus. He made 151 league appearances during his six seasons with the club.

== International career ==
Ilunga made several appearances for the Zaire national team, including six 1982 FIFA World Cup qualifying matches. He was on the Zairian squad at the 1976 African Cup of Nations and appeared in two matches.
