= Andreas Antonatos =

Greek footballer (1938–2023)

Personal information
- Date of birth: 30 November 1938
- Place of birth: Patras, Greece
- Date of death: 25 August 2023 (aged 84)
- Position: Midfielder

Senior career*
Years	Team	Apps	(Gls)
1960–1962	Panachaiki		
1962–1969	Ethnikos Piraeus		

International career
1964	Greece	1	(0)

Managerial career
- 1976: Ethnikos Piraeus (caretaker)
- 1977: Ethnikos Piraeus (caretaker)
- 1983: Ethnikos Piraeus (caretaker)
- 1991–1992: Ethnikos Piraeus
- * Club domestic league appearances and goals

Andreas Antonatos (Greek: Ανδρέας Αντωνάτος; 30 November 1938 – 25 August 2023) was a Greek football player, midfielder and later manager. He had a great career playing for Ethnikos Piraeus.

Antonatos died on 25 August 2023, at the age of 84.
