= Nikos Nentidis =

Greek footballer (born in 1966)

Personal information
- Full name: Nikolaos Nentidis
- Date of birth: 7 June 1966 (age 60)
- Place of birth: Koufalia, Greece
- Height: 1.78 m (5 ft 10 in)
- Position: Left-back

Team information
- Current team: Ethnikos Piraeus (manager)

Senior career*
| Years | Team | Apps | (Gls) |
| 1983–1985 | PAO Koufalia | | |
| 1985–1988 | Apollon Kalamarias | | |
| 1988–1993 | Olympiacos | | |
| 1993–1994 | Iraklis | | |
| 1994–1995 | Agrotikos Asteras | | |
| 1995–1996 | Apollon Kalamarias | | |
| 1996–1997 | Nafpaktiakos Asteras | | |
| 1997–1998 | Agrotikos Asteras | | |

Managerial career
- 2012–2013: Xanthi (assistant)
- 2014–2016: Xanthi (assistant)
- 2014: → Xanthi (caretaker)
- 2016–2017: Agrotikos Asteras
- 2017–2018: Ethnikos Piraeus
- 2018–2019: Xanthi (assistant)
- 2019: Panserraikos
- 2023: Poseidon Nea Michaniona
- 2024: Forge FC (assistant)
- 2026–: Ethnikos Piraeus
- * Club domestic league appearances and goals

Nikos Nentidis (Greek: Νίκος Νεντίδης; born 7 June 1966) is a Greek retired football defender and later manager. He is the current manager of Gamma Ethniki club Ethnikos Piraeus
