= Petr Packert =

Czech footballer (1943–2003)

Personal information
- Date of birth: 22 February 1943
- Place of birth: Prague, Bohemia and Moravia
- Date of death: 23 April 2003 (aged 60)
- Place of death: Prague, Czech Republic
- Position: Midfielder

Senior career*
Years	Team	Apps	(Gls)
1961–1963	Dukla Prague		
1963–1976	Bohemians Prague		
1976–1977	TJ Modřany		

Managerial career
- 1977–1979: Czechoslovakia U16
- 1979–1981: Czechoslovakia U18
- 1982–1983: Czechoslovakia U21
- 1985: OFI
- 1985–1986: Panathinaikos
- 1986–1989: Ethnikos Piraeus
- 1990–1991: PAS Giannina
- 1993: Bohemians Prague
- 1994–1995: Pagkorinthiakos
- 1995–1996: Tatran Poštorná
- 1997–1998: ES Sétif
- * Club domestic league appearances and goals

Petr Packert (22 February 1943 – 23 April 2003) was a Czech football player and manager.

He played for Dukla Prague, Bohemians Prague and TJ Modřany.

He coached Czechoslovakia U16, Czechoslovakia U18, Czechoslovakia U21, OFI, Panathinaikos, Ethnikos Piraeus, PAS Giannina, Bohemians Prague, Pagkorinthiakos, Tatran Poštorná and ES Sétif.
