= Athanasios Gerolymos =

Greek footballer

Personal information
- Full name: Athanasios Gerolymos
- Date of birth: 13 December 1995 (age 30)
- Place of birth: Kallithea, Greece
- Position: Left back

Team information
- Current team: Diagoras

Youth career
- Panelefsiniakos

Senior career*
| Years | Team | Apps | (Gls) |
| 2012–2013 | Panelefsiniakos | 0 | (0) |
| 2013–2018 | Ethnikos Piraeus | 0 | (0) |
| 2018– | Diagoras | 0 | (0) |
- * Club domestic league appearances and goals

Nasos Gerolymos (Greek: Νάσος Γερόλυμος; born 13 December 1995) is a Greek footballer, who as of 2018 plays for Diagoras in the Football League 2 as a left back.
