= Andy Papoulias =

American soccer player

Personal information
- Full name: Andreas Papoulias
- Date of birth: November 9, 1962 (age 63)
- Position: Midfielder

Senior career*
Years	Team	Apps	(Gls)
1979	New York Apollo		
1981	Carolina Lightnin'		
1984	New York Nationals		
1984	Las Vegas Americans (indoor)	8	(1)
1985	New York Cosmos (indoor)	2	(0)
1985	Greek American AA		
1985–1986	PAS Giannina	13	(3)
1986–1987	Ethnikos Piraeus	23	(6)
1987–1988	Diagoras	22	(2)
1988–1989	Ethnikos Piraeus	13	(0)
1992	Tampa Bay Rowdies	1	(0)

International career
1984–1985	United States	3	(0)
- * Club domestic league appearances and goals

Andreas "Andy" Papoulias is an American former soccer player who played as a midfielder. He earned three caps with the U.S. national team in 1984 and 1985.

== Club career ==
In 1979, Papoulias played for the New York Apollo of the American Soccer League. He then moved to the Carolina Lightnin' for the 1981 season. In 1984, Papoulias played for the New York Nationals in the United Soccer League. In 1984, he began the season with the Las Vegas Americans of the Major Indoor Soccer League season. He then moved to the New York Cosmos for two games. In 1985, he moved to the Greek American AA of the Cosmopolitan Soccer League. He then spent several years playing in Greece before returning to the United States in 1989 to play for the Tampa Bay Rowdies of the American Soccer League. However, the team was unable to sign him before the transfer dead line. He returned to Europe where he continued to play in Greece and Cyprus until signing with the Rowdies for the 1992 season. He played only one game with Tampa Bay before being waived on May 27, 1992.

== National team ==
Papoulias' first game with the national team came when he came on for Chico Borja in a November 30, 1984 tie with Ecuador. On December 2, 1984, he came on for Sonny Askew in another tie with Ecuador. His last national team game came on February 8, 1985, when he replaced Jeff Hooker in the 74th minute of a 1–1 tie with Switzerland.
