= Alexandros Souflas =

Finnish footballer (born 1988)

Personal information
- Date of birth: 8 October 1988 (age 38)
- Place of birth: Helsinki, Finland
- Height: 1.83 m (6 ft 0 in)
- Position: Midfielder

Youth career
- Atromitos

Senior career*
Years	Team	Apps	(Gls)
2006–2008	Atromitos	1	(0)
2008	Fostiras		
2009–2011	Apollon Smyrnis		
2011–2012	Proodeftiki	18	(5)
2012–2013	Niki Volos	0	(0)
2013	Thrasyvoulos	6	(0)
2013–2016	Ethnikos Piraeus		
2016–2018	Agios Ierotheos		
2018–2019	Thriamvos Serviana		
2019	Aias Salamina		
2019–2020	Olympiacos Agios Stefanos		
2020–2022	Aris Petroupolis		
2022	AO Karava		

International career
- Finland U20
- * Club domestic league appearances and goals

Alexandros Souflas (born 8 October 1988) is a professional footballer who plays as a midfielder. Born in Finland, Souflas is of Greek descent. He has spent the majority of his career in Greek leagues, and represented Finland at youth international levels.

In the 2015–16 Gamma Ethniki season, Souflas scored 12 goals for Ethnikos Piraeus, making him the club's best goalscorer of the season. In 2022 he joined AO Karava.
