= Ethnikos Piraeus F.C. =

Association football club in Greece

Ethnikos Piraeus
- Full name: Ethnikos Piraeus 1923 (Εθνικός Πειραιώς 1923)
- Nicknames: Κυανόλευκοι (The Blue-whites); Πινέζες (Drawing pins)
- Founded: 21 November 1923; 102 years ago
- Ground: Spyros Gialampidis Stadium, Tavros, Greece
- Capacity: 4,000
- Chairman: Dimitris Koulouris
- Manager: Nikos Nentidis
- League: Gamma Ethniki
- 2025–26: Gamma Ethniki (Group 6), 1st
- Website: https://www.ethnikos.gr/
Home colours	Away colours

Ethnikos Piraeus F.C. (Greek: Εθνικός Πειραιώς) or simply Ethnikos is a Greek football club based in Piraeus and its parent sports club is Ethnikos OFPF. The club was officially formed on 21 November 1923 as Keravnos Piraeus (English: Lightning Piraeus), but existed unofficially since 1922. One year later the club was renamed to Young Boys Titan, after some players' secession that formed Peiraikos Podosfairikos Omilos (English: Piraeus' Football Group). The club was renamed to Ethnikos (English: National) on 23 December 1924, after it merged with Peiraikos Podosfairikos Omilos. It is part of the multi-sport club Ethnikos Piraeus.

Ethnikos Piraeus is one of the founding members of Hellenic Football Federation in 1928, and represented Piraeus to the finals of the Panhellenic Championship's inaugural season in 1927–28. Ethnikos ranks 10th all time in first division victories (427) despite last competing in the first tier back in 1998–99 season.

They have won the 1932–33 Greek Cup, thus they are one of only 11 clubs that have won either the domestic championship or the domestic cup in Greece. Ethnikos was one of seven clubs, including AEK Athens, PAOK, Panathinaikos, Aris Thessaloniki, Olympiacos and Panionios, never to have been relegated from the league until 1990. They have also been involved in international football playing a number of friendlies against famous clubs such as Inter Milan, Galatasaray, and the great Hungary national football team in the 1950s, and participated in the Balkans Cup on two occasions. They have had a turbulent recent history, and are currently competing in the third division Gamma Ethniki.

== Background ==
Known as the club of the upper classes of Piraeus (whereas Olympiacos has always been the team of the lower classes), Ethnikos was established in 1923 from a merger of local sides - Peiraikos Omilos FC and elements of Omilos Filathlon Piraeus — as Omilos Filathlon Piraeus - Faliro (Greek: Όμιλος Φιλάθλων Πειραιώς - Φαλήρου) — meaning Fans' Club of Piraeus and Faliro — after the Piraeus-based football club Athletic and Football Club of Piraeus (Greek: Αθλητικός και Ποδοσφαιρικός Σύλλογος Πειραιώς), winner of the 1924 Athens-Piraeus Regional Championship, split into two.

From the break-up, one group, led by Giorgos Chatziandreou, brothers Kostas and Dimitris Ferlemis, and Christos Peppas, ultimately formed Omilos Filathlon Piraeus – Faliro (Greek: Όμιλος Φιλάθλων Πειραιώς – Φαλήρου), meaning Fans' Club of Piraeus and Faliro in 1924, and then changed the name to Ethnikos O.F.P.F. in February 1925 the other group, led by Yiannis Andrianopoulos and his five brothers, formed the club that evolved into Olympiacos CFP in March 1925.

Ethnikos O.F.P.F., colloquially referred to as Ethnikos Piraeus, is a multi-sport club with teams competing in football, water polo, volleyball and basketball.

The club's most significant teams, in terms of history and success, are their football and water polo teams, though football is the more popular sport.

== History ==
=== Panhellenic Championship years ===
Prior to 1959–60 Greek football was played in regional championships (Athens, Piraeus, and Thessaloniki championships and/or North and South championships) and then the top teams from each region would advance to play for the national championship. In some pre-War years a traditional Final match was played between 2 regional champions, but generally the Panhellenic Championship was played as a final round-robin between at least 3 teams.

==== 1920s–1930s ====
Ethnikos was Piraeus Champion in 1927–28, but lost the national championship to Aris. The following year Ethnikos was Piraeus Champion once again, but the national championship was not played.

In 1932–33 Ethnikos won the Greek Cup, the club’s only major title. Ethnikos eliminated A.E.K. in the second round, Apollon in the Quarterfinals and Olympiacos in the Semifinals before meeting Aris in the Final. Ethnikos and Aris played to a 2–2 draw in Thessaloniki, but Ethnikos won the replay 2–1 and took the Cup.

In 1934–35 Ethnikos was again Piraeus Champion, and then champion of the South Division, while Aris was champion of the North Division, but Ethnikos and Aris were prevented from playing each other for the national championship due to preparation of the national team for the Balkan Cup.

Ethnikos won another Piraeus Championship in 1938–39, but lost the South Division by 2 points, just missing out on a chance to play for the national championship.

Ethnikos reached the Semifinals of the Greek Cup in 1938–39 and 1939–40, but lost to PAOK and Panathinaikos, respectively.

==== 1950s: the Puskás affair ====
The Ethnikos teams of the mid-to late 1950s are considered by many to be Ethnikos' greatest teams.

In 1955–56 Ethnikos finished 2nd in Greece, just 1 point behind champions Olympiacos.

In 1956–57 a scandal robbed Ethnikos of the national championship. With 4 matches left in the national championship, Ethnikos was favorite for the title, and next on the schedule was Olympiacos, who Ethnikos had already defeated earlier in the season. Prior to the Olympiacos match though, Ethnikos was disqualified from the championship, on the accusation of professionalism, as they had allegedly been in contact with Hungarian stars Ferenc Puskás, Zoltan Czibor and Sándor Kocsis. According to the press the club had an almost done deal with the Hungarian internationals. Ethnikos was docked 4 points and not allowed to play the final 4 matches of the season, and Olympiacos took the championship.

=== Alpha Ethniki years ===
From 1959–60 the Greek championship changed to its modern form and the first division became known as Alpha Ethniki (usually noted as Alpha Ethniki). Since 1959–60 Ethnikos are tied for the 8th-most first division participations with 36, along with OFI and Apollon. Ahead of Ethnikos are traditional powers Olympiacos, Panathinaikos, AEK Athens and PAOK (all of whom have competed in the first division every season except AEK for two seasons recently) as well as Iraklis, Aris and Panionios. (In 2006–07 the first division was renamed from Alpha Ethniki to Super League).

==== 1960s ====
During the 1960s Ethnikos’ best league finishes were 5th in 1962–63 and 6th in 1960–61 and 1967–68. From 1960–61 to 1968–69 Ethnikos never finished outside the top 10.

Ethnikos reached the Semifinals of the Greek Cup twice during the 1960s. In 1967–68 Ethnikos lost in the Semifinals to Panathinaikos. The following year Ethnikos came desperately close to another Cup Final– after defeating PAOK 5–4 in the Quarterfinals, Ethnikos lost to Olympiacos 4–3 after extra time in the Semifinals.

==== 1970s ====
In 1974–75 Ethnikos made their best challenge for the league in the modern era. That season Ethnikos emerged as the winter champion, going undefeated through the first half of the season, but they could not keep up the pace and ultimately finished 4th (1 point behind PAOK for 3rd place and a UEFA Cup berth), while Olympiacos took the championship.

Though never making another legitimate challenge for the league championship, Ethnikos remained consistently competitive during the 1970s, never finishing outside of the top 10.

Ethnikos twice had the league’s top scorer during the 1970s: in the 1974–75 Roberto Calcadera’s total of 20 goals was tied for league-best with Panathinaikos’ Antonis Antoniadis and in 1976–77 Thanasis Intzoglou led the league with 22 goals.

Ethnikos’ two best runs in the Greek Cup in the 1970s were halted by PAOK. In 1972–72 Ethnikos lost to PAOK 3–2 in the Semifinals and in 1976–77 Ethnikos was defeated by PAOK in the Quarterfinals.

==== 1980s ====
Ethnikos made decent 7th-place finishes in 1979–80 and 1980–81, but the team would mostly struggle through the rest of the 1980s.

In 1983–84 and 1985–86 Ethnikos reached the Quarterfinals of the Greek Cup but was then eliminated by Panathinaikos and Olympiacos, respectively. In 1983–84, Ethnikos eliminated Olympiacos in the round of 16 drawing both games (0–0 and 1–1) progressing through the away goals rule. Specifically, in the replay match, Ethnikos was playing roughly 60 minutes with 10 men and despite going 1–0 down at half time, managed to equalize at the last play of the match with a back header coming of the team's centre back Fotis Papadopoulos. It was a shock elimination of Olympiacos who was the heavy favorite of the tie.

In 1986–87 Ethnikos made a very mediocre 10th-place finish, but late in the season won 6–3 away to Panathinaikos. It is Panathinaikos's worst championship home game defeat since 1960, as no other team has ever scored six goals at Panathinaikos's ground.

The 1987–88 team was the last truly competitive Ethnikos team to date. That year Ethnikos tried to make a run at a UEFA Cup berth, but ultimately fell short and finished 7th. The 7th-place finish though was good enough to take some satisfaction from finishing ahead of Olympiacos, who finished 8th.

In the 1988–89 season Ethnikos made a good run in the Cup, reaching the Semifinals before being eliminated by Panathinaikos, but in the league the team finished in the bottom 3 and was relegated to Beta Ethniki for the first time in their history.

=== Relegation from Alpha Ethniki ===
==== 1990s ====
After being relegated from Alpha Ethniki for the first time in 1989, Ethnikos bounced between Alpha and Beta Ethniki throughout the 1990s. Since a last place finish in 1998–99 though, Ethnikos has not managed to return to Alpha Ethniki.

The Ethnikos teams of the 1990s included several young players who would leave the club and become star players elsewhere, such as Michalis Kapsis, Yannis Anastasiou and Andreas Niniadis.

==== 2000s ====
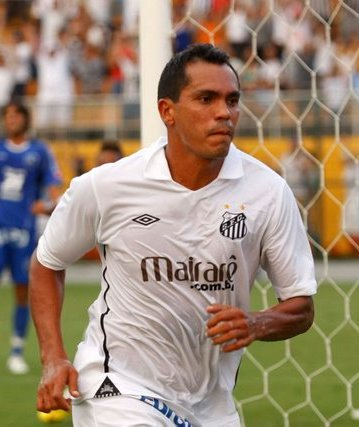
Giovanni, played for Ethnikos in 2007 and considered one of the most prestigious players ever playing for the club.

After the 1999–00 season Ethnikos fell from Beta Ethniki to Gamma Ethniki for the first time. The club’s ultimate low point came when it fell from Gamma Ethniki and spent the 2003–04 season in Delta Ethniki.

In summer 2004 Ethnikos merged with A.O. Mani, the club maintained Ethnikos' logo and colors and continued to be based in Piraeus, but in name became Ethnikos Piraeus – A.O. Mani. Ethnikos fans were very upset with the name change, but that problem was eventually solved, as the club was officially renamed Ethnikos Piraeus in 2007.

In 2005–06 Ethnikos earned promotion back to Beta Ethniki in the final minute of the final match of the season. With time expiring, a free kickgoal from Eduardo Sander Da Silva against Messiniakos made the final score 1–1 and gave Ethnikos the point needed for promotion.

Their first season 2006–07 back in the second tier was successful and in the 2009–10 season they reached the promotion play-offs, but failed to win promotion. It was the first time since the 1999 relegation that the team claimed their return to the Greek football's top flight.

==== 2010s ====
Next season after having been found guilty of forgery during the winter transfer window, the club was forcibly relegated to the Delta Ethniki for the 2011/12 season. Ethnikos were placed in the Group 9 and relegated to the local amateur leagues at the 5th level of the Greek football pyramid, the lowest in their history.

In the 2012/13 season they were crowned Piraeus champions and also reached the Piraeus Cup final, but failed to win promotion to the Football League 2 via the play-offs. Ethnikos won the double in the 2013/14 season (Piraeus champions and Cup winners), and finally managed to return to the third tier of Greek football through the promotion play-offs where they topped the Group 9. The 2014–15 Gamma Ethniki saw them 4th in the Group 4 and runners-up of the Football League 2 Cup. Last season they finished runners-up in the Group 6 of the 2021–22 Gamma Ethniki.

The club celebrated its centennial anniversary with a victory over Agios Nikolaos (1–0) on 19 November 2023.

== Balkans Cup ==
=== 1976 competition ===
After Ethnikos finishing 4th in the 1974–75 Greek League and losing out on a UEFA Cup spot, qualified for the Balkans Cup for the first time in its history. Ethnikos did manage to win only one game against Dinamo Zagreb, as the star player of the team Washington Calcattera had been injured. They finished bottom of the Group B. The results:

- March 17, 1976, Karaiskaki Stadium: Ethnikos - GNK Dinamo Zagreb 1–0
- April 14, 1976, Dinamo Stadium: FK Dinamo Tirana - Ethnikos 2–0
- April 26, 1976, Karaiskaki Stadium: Ethnikos - FK Dinamo Tirana 3–4
- April 28, 1976, Karaiskaki Stadium: GNK Dinamo Zagreb - Ethnikos 2–1

=== 1992 competition ===
The Balkans Cup had been limited to just 6 teams. Ethnikos participated as newly promoted team (according to the competition new rule) and qualified automatically to the semifinals, but did not manage to secure a place in the final, though they came close to achieve it in the second leg. The results:

- November 7, 1991, Yusuf Ziya Öniş Stadium: Sarıyer S.K. - Ethnikos 5–0
- November 20, 1991, Karaiskaki Stadium: Ethnikos - Sarıyer S.K. 3–0

== Stadiums ==
=== Karaiskakis Stadium (1923–2000) ===
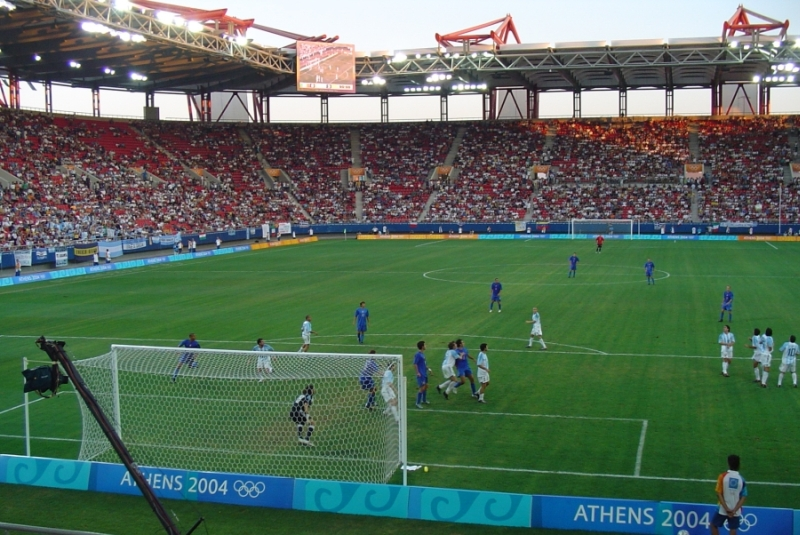
Karaiskakis Stadium in 2004

Karaiskakis Stadium in the Faliro area of Piraeus, commonly referred to as Karaiskaki, is the traditional home of both Olympiacos and Ethnikos, but only Olympiacos has played there since the stadium was leveled and rebuilt purely at Olympiacos' expenses ahead of the 2004 Summer Olympics.

In 2002 Olympiacos President Socratis Kokkalis, in announcing the project to rebuild Karaiskakis, said, "It is our wish that [the new stadium] will also be used by Ethnikos F.C., as Karaiskaki is the historic home of both [Olympiacos and Ethnikos]".

Despite that statement, all of the new stadium's seats were painted Olympiacos' red, rather than a neutral color.

When the new Karaiskakis was completed in 2004, Ethnikos was struggling in Gamma Ethniki, and did not move into the stadium; the team instead continued to play most of its home matches in Nikaia Municipal Gymnasium (2002–2005), a small stadium in the Nikaia area of Piraeus, which is the traditional home of Proodeftiki F.C.

In 2005–06 Ethnikos moved to Georgios Kamaras Stadium in Rizoupoli (where Olympiacos played its home matches during the Karaiskakis renovations), and played there one more season until the move to Elliniko in 2007.

Despite a clause in the contract of Olympiacos's long-term lease of the stadium, which states that Ethnikos may return to Karaiskaki whenever they wanted, but paying some fees for stadium-related maintenance costs, the team has opted not to return to Karaiskaki in the near future. The Chairman of Ethnikos has stated that whenever the team returns to the top division, the issue of returning to Karaiskaki will be revisited.

Karaiskakis Stadium is owned by the Hellenic Olympic Committee.

=== Elliniko (2007–2014) ===
In August 2007 Ethnikos President Nikos Pirounias finalized a deal with the City of Ellinikon for use of the complex for 3 years with an option for a further 3 years. The Olympic Baseball Centre's main stadium underwent renovations for football use, and Ethnikos began playing matches there during the 2007–08 season; the team played its first official match in its new home on October 20, 2007. The facility became known as Elliniko Stadium, and is commonly referred to as Elliniko.

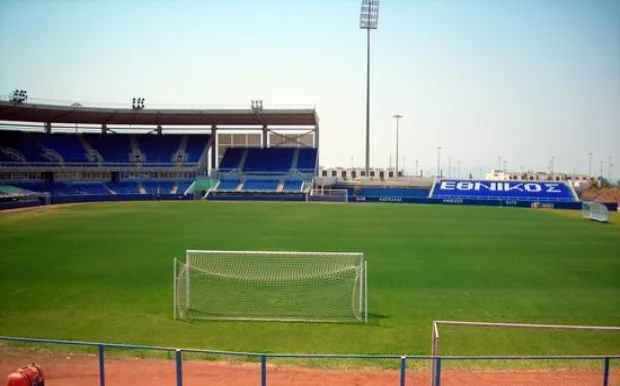
Hellinikon Stadium

Helliniko Olympic Complex in Ellinikon, was located approximately 8 kilometres south of the center of Athens, near Glyfada on the Mediterranean coast.

The complex was built on the site of the former Ellinikon International Airport for the staging of the 2004 Summer Olympics and 2004 Summer Paralympics, and consisted of the following venues: Helliniko Indoor Arena (Basketball and Team handball); Helliniko Fencing Hall; Olympic Hockey Stadium (Field hockey); Helliniko Baseball Centre; Helliniko Softball Centre; and Helliniko Slalom Centre (Whitewater slalom).

The complex also included new training pitches for both Ethnikos' first team and youth team.

Ahead of the 2008–09 season renovations continued and seating capacity was increased to 9,000. In 2013 AEK FC started talks with the Olympic Committee for using the stadium and increasing the capacity to 22.000, but there was no official offer. Ethnikos continued playing at Elliniko for one more season and then moved to Moschato ground with wooden stands and capacity of 2,500 (2014–2017). The Elliniko stadium is currently out of use, abandoned and has been used as a refugees camp point instead, having suffered severe damages which led to its closure.
During the 2017–2021 period Ethnikos moved to the Grigoris Lambrakis Stadium. For the 2021–22 season the club currently used the Agioi Anargyroi Municipal Stadium and for the 2022–23 season the Moschato Municipal Stadium.

In 2024, Ethnikos is scheduled to use as a home ground the renovated Peace And Friendship stadium (SEF) which is located in the Neo Faliro – Kastella area where Ethnikos was founded. The stadium will be used for third division matches and will have at first, a capacity of 1.500 spectators.

=== Peace and Friendship Stadium (2024–) ===
In 2024, Piraeus Municipality is renovating the Peace and Friendship Stadium for all amateur Piraeus clubs. Ethnikos was scheduled to use the stadium for the 2023–24 second half of the season, competing at the third-tier of Greek football. The stadium, planned to have a standing capacity of 1,600 spectators is yet to be renovated, thus leading Ethnikos in using the Keratsini Municipal Stadium (1,500 capacity) for its 2024–25 third division championship season.

== Crest and colours ==
Previous crest (2012–2013)

Ethnikos' crest has changed through times. The original club logo was a white cross in a blue coloured badge with the monotype E in the middle of the cross depicting the Greek flag. Later it was replaced by one with five blue and four white stripes having the club's name on the top of the badge, again resembling the Greek flag. After the 2011 takeover of the club by Alexis Aggelopoulos, the logo was changed once again to a more "modern" looking one but with supporters's demand, the older one was restored. Throughout the entire club's history its colours were blue or cyan and white, to resemble the colours of the Greek flag.

=== Kit evolution ===
1923–24	1932–33	1955–56	1956–57	1987–88	1989–90	2016–17

== Rivalries ==
=== Piraeus derby (football) ===
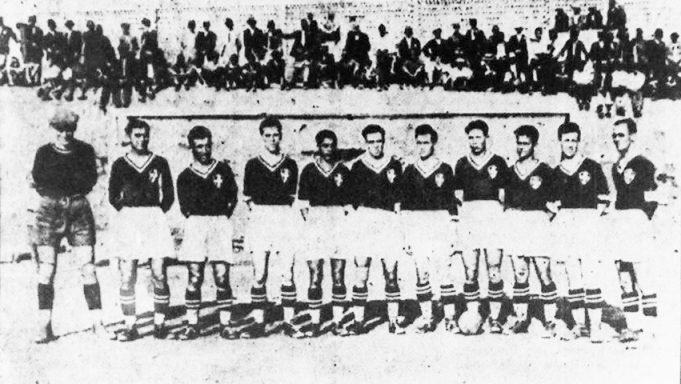
Ethnikos winner's cup team in 1933

Since the two clubs were established in the mid-1920s, Ethnikos' traditional local rival has been Olympiacos, one of the two most popular and successful multi-sport clubs in Greece along with Panathinaikos.

Ethnikos was founded on November 21, 1923 while Olympiacos was founded on March 10, 1925.

Olympiacos has never been relegated in football while Ethnikos has 4 relegations from the first division (1990, 1992, 1996, 1999)

In water polo Olympiacos has never been relegated while Ethnikos has been relegated twice (2009, 2012).

While a legitimate rivalry between Ethnikos and Olympiacos still exists in water polo (Ethnikos Piraeus Water Polo Club has won the most Greek water polo championships of any club since 1958, while Olympiacos Water Polo Club has won the second-most), that is no longer the case in football. In water polo, Ethnikos still holds an array of records and despite its last win against Olympiacos in 2008, Olympiacos has only managed to surpass him in head to head victories in 2016.

Ethnikos and Olympiacos were more or less evenly matched and had great battles for Piraeus supremacy in the 1920s and 1930s, but thereafter Olympiacos became increasingly more powerful and successful; Ethnikos has not defeated Olympiacos in a league match since the 1985–86 season and has not finished above Olympiacos in the league standings since the 1987–88 season.

Olympiacos's biggest win is 5–0 twice (1966, 1968) while Ethnikos' is 4–2 twice (1929, 1939)

Since 1960 and the introduction of Alpha Ethniki, Olympiacos won 53 times, Ethnikos 4 times and 15 matches ended as a draw.

Last win for Ethnikos is in 1986 in Olympic Stadium (2–0) while Olympiacos's is the last match they played each other in 1999 (0–3 for Olympiacos).

A recent point of contention for Ethnikos fans has to do with Karaiskakis Stadium. Karaiskakis is the traditional home of both Olympiacos and Ethnikos, but only Olympiacos has played there since the stadium was rebuilt for use in the 2004 Summer Olympics.

== Honours ==
=== Domestic ===
- Panhellenic Championship (first tier)
  - Runners-up (2): 1928, 1956
- Greek Cup
  - Winners (1): 1933
  - Semi-finalists (7): 1939, 1940, 1950, 1968, 1969, 1973, 1989
- Piraeus FCA Championship (Regional Championship, pre-Alpha Ethniki/Super League format)
  - Winners (4): 1928, 1929, 1935, 1939
  - Runners-up (12): 1925, 1934, 1937, 1938, 1946, 1949, 1950, 1951, 1952, 1953, 1956, 1959
- Beta Ethniki (second tier league championship)
  - Winners (1): 1991
- Piraeus FCA Championship (Regional Championship)
  - Winners (2): 2013, 2014
- Gamma Ethniki Cup
  - Runners-up (1) : (2015)
- Piraeus FCA Cup (Regional cup)
  - Winners (6): 2014, 2019, 2023, 2024, 2025, 2026
  - Runners-up (1): 2013
- Greek Easter Cup
  - Winners (1) : 1937

== Season-by-season ==
Panhellenic Championship years (until 1959)

- 1924–25: Piraeus: 2nd
- 1925–26: Piraeus: Disqualified
- 1926–27: Piraeus: 2nd
- 1927–28: Piraeus: 1st / National: 2nd
- 1928–29: Piraeus: 1st
- 1929–30: Piraeus: 2nd
- 1930–31: Piraeus: 4th / National: 7th
- 1931–32: National: 4th
- 1932–33: South: 4th
- 1933–34: Piraeus: 2nd / South: 3rd
- 1934–35: Piraeus: 1st / South: 1st
- 1935–36: National: 6th
- 1936–37: Piraeus: 2nd
- 1937–38: Piraeus: 2nd
- 1938–39: Piraeus: 1st / National: 3rd
- 1939–40: South: 4th
- 1940–41: No championship
- 1941–42: No championship
- 1942–43: No championship
- 1943–44: No championship
- 1944–45: No championship
- 1945–46: Piraeus: 2nd
- 1946–47: Piraeus: 3rd
- 1947–48: Piraeus: 4th
- 1948–49: Piraeus: 2nd
- 1949–50: Piraeus: 2nd
- 1950–51: Piraeus: 2nd
- 1951–52: Piraeus: 2nd
- 1952–53: Piraeus: 2nd
- 1953–54: Piraeus: 2nd
- 1954–55: Piraeus: 2nd
- 1955–56: Piraeus: 2nd / National: 2nd
- 1956–57: Piraeus: 3rd / National: Disqualified
- 1957–58: Piraeus: 3rd / National: 10th
- 1958–59: Piraeus: 2nd / National: 2nd

(Note: National Championship not played in 1928–29 and 1934–35, seasons when Ethnikos won either the regional championship, or the South Greece championship, In 1928–29 and 1934–35 Ethnikos shared the regional title with Olympiacos)

Alpha Ethniki/Super League years (since 1959–60)

- 1959–60: Alpha Ethniki: 12th
- 1960–61: Alpha Ethniki: 6th
- 1961–62: Alpha Ethniki: 7th
- 1962–63: Alpha Ethniki: 5th
- 1963–64: Alpha Ethniki: 10th
- 1964–65: Alpha Ethniki: 9th
- 1965–66: Alpha Ethniki: 7th
- 1966–67: Alpha Ethniki: 7th
- 1967–68: Alpha Ethniki: 6th
- 1968–69: Alpha Ethniki: 8th
- 1969–70: Alpha Ethniki: 11th
- 1970–71: Alpha Ethniki: 8th
- 1971–72: Alpha Ethniki: 8th
- 1972–73: Alpha Ethniki: 6th
- 1973–74: Alpha Ethniki: 10th
- 1974–75: Alpha Ethniki: 4th
- 1975–76: Alpha Ethniki: 7th
- 1976–77: Alpha Ethniki: 8th
- 1977–78: Alpha Ethniki: 7th
- 1978–79: Alpha Ethniki: 8th
- 1979–80: Alpha Ethniki: 7th
- 1980–81: Alpha Ethniki: 7th
- 1981–82: Alpha Ethniki: 13th
- 1982–83: Alpha Ethniki: 11th
- 1983–84: Alpha Ethniki: 9th
- 1984–85: Alpha Ethniki: 9th
- 1985–86: Alpha Ethniki: 13th
- 1986–87: Alpha Ethniki: 11th
- 1987–88: Alpha Ethniki: 7th
- 1988–89: Alpha Ethniki: 14th
- 1989–90: Alpha Ethniki: 18th
- 1990–91: Beta Ethniki: 1st
- 1991–92: Alpha Ethniki: 18th
- 1992–93: Beta Ethniki: 9th
- 1993–94: Beta Ethniki: 3rd
- 1994–95: Alpha Ethniki: 13th
- 1995–96: Alpha Ethniki: 18th
- 1996–97: Beta Ethniki: 3rd
- 1997–98: Alpha Ethniki: 15th
- 1998–99: Alpha Ethniki: 18th
- 1999–00: Beta Ethniki: 15th
- 2000–01: Gamma Ethniki: 4th
- 2001–02: Gamma Ethniki: 9th
- 2002–03: Gamma Ethniki: 17th
- 2003–04: Delta Ethniki: 7th
- 2004–05: Gamma Ethniki: 4th
- 2005–06: Gamma Ethniki: 2nd
- 2006–07: Beta Ethniki: 6th
- 2007–08: Beta Ethniki: 9th
- 2008–09: Beta Ethniki: 13th
- 2009–10: Beta Ethniki: 4th
- 2010–11: Beta Ethniki: 16th
- 2011–12: Delta Ethniki: 10th
- 2012–13: A' EPSP: 1st
- 2013–14: A' EPSP: 1st
- 2014–15: Gamma Ethniki: 5th
- 2015–16: Gamma Ethniki: 4th
- 2016–17: Gamma Ethniki: 4th
- 2017–18: Gamma Ethniki: 1st Qualified for the Promotion Playoffs (failed to promote)
- 2018–19: Gamma Ethniki: 3rd
- 2019–20: Gamma Ethniki: 8th
- 2020–21: Gamma Ethniki: 6th
- 2021–22: Gamma Ethniki: 2nd
- 2022–23: Gamma Ethniki: 5th
- 2023–24: Gamma Ethniki: 2nd
- 2024–25: Gamma Ethniki: 2nd
- 2025–26: Gamma Ethniki: 1st Qualified for the Promotion Playoffs (failed to promote)

Since 1927–28:

- 49 seasons in First tier of Greek football (10th–most in Greece) (1928, 1931–1936, 1939–1940, 1956–1959, 1960–1990, 1992, 1995–1996, 1998–1999)
- 10 seasons in Second tier of Greek football (1991, 1993–1994, 1997, 2000, 2007–2011)
- 16 seasons in Third tier of Greek football (2001–2003, 2005–2006, 2015–2019, 2022–)
- 4 seasons in Fourth tier of Greek football (2004, 2012, 2020–2021)
- 2 seasons in Local tier of Piraeus football (2013, 2014)

== Records and statistics ==
=== Most appearances (Alpha Ethniki) ===
Rank	Name	Apps
1	(Greece) Angelos Kremmydas (1964–1977)	383
2	(Greece) Dimitris Chatziioannoglou	367
3	(Greece) Stelios Nikiforakis	320
4	(Greece) Panagiotis Kottidis	300
5	(Greece) Dimitris Moutafis	246
6	(Greece) Ilias Armodoros	169

=== Most appearances by a foreign player (Alpha Ethniki) ===
Rank	Name	Apps
1	(Zaire) Masengo Ilunga (1982–1988)	161
2	(West Germany) Thomas Rohrbach	72
3	(Greece) (Cape Verde) Daniel Batista	67
4	(Socialist Federal Republic of Yugoslavia) Abid Kovacevic	66
5	(Cameroon) Joël Epalle	53
6	(Norway) Roy Wassberg	46
7	(Bulgaria) Georgi Denev	42

=== Most goals (Alpha Ethniki) ===
Rank	Name	Goals
1	(Greece) Dimitris Chatziioannoglou (1960–1976)	102
2	(Greece) Michalis Kritikopoulos	79
3	(Greece) Andreas Antonatos	54
4	(Greece) Panagiotis Kottidis	54
5	(Greece) Kostas Batsinilas	36
6	(Greece) Giorgos Karaїskos	30
7	(Greece) Thanasis Intzoglou	28
8	(Greece) Takis Eleftheriadis	27
9	(Greece) Petros Leventakos	25
10	(Greece) Tasos Mitropoulos	25

=== Most goals by a foreign player (Alpha Ethniki) ===
Rank	Name	Goals
1	(Uruguay) Washington Calcaterra (1975, 1977–1980)	27
2	(Serbia) Zoran Jovicic	19
3	(Bulgaria) Georgi Denev	18
4	(Greece) Daniel Batista	15
5	(Zaire) Masengo Ilunga	12
6	(West Germany) Thomas Rohrbach	11

=== Top scorers by season ===
Season	Name	Goals	League
1931–12	(Greece) Bourletidis	9	Panhellenic Championship
1933–34	(Greece) Lapatas	9	Panhellenic Championship
1934–35	(Greece) Kostas Choumis	15	Panhellenic Championship
1935–36	(Greece) Kostas Choumis	15	Panhellenic Championship
1955–56	(Greece) Christos Karaoulanis	6	Panhellenic Championship
1956–57	(Greece) Christos Karaoulanis	8	Panhellenic Championship
1962–63	(Greece) Andreas Antonatos	13	Alpha Ethniki
1968–69	(Greece) Michalis Kritikopoulos	13	Alpha Ethniki
1969–70	(Greece) Michalis Kritikopoulos	15	Alpha Ethniki
1970–71	(Greece) Michalis Kritikopoulos	12	Alpha Ethniki
1971–72	(Greece) Christos Chatziioannidis	7	Alpha Ethniki
1972–73	(Greece) Michalis Kritikopoulos	11	Alpha Ethniki
1973–74	(Greece) Giannis Mousouris	9	Alpha Ethniki
1974–75	(Uruguay) Washington Calcaterra	20	Alpha Ethniki
1975–76	(Greece) Totis Filakouris	13	Alpha Ethniki
1976–77	(Greece) Thanasis Intzoglou	22	Alpha Ethniki
1977–78	(Greece) Tasos Mitropoulos	8	Alpha Ethniki
1978–79	(Greece) Giorgos Karaiskos	10	Alpha Ethniki
1979–80	(Greece) Panagiotis Labrinos	9	Alpha Ethniki
1980–81	(Greece) Dimitris Seitaridis	10	Alpha Ethniki
1981–82	(Greece) Panagiotis Kottidis	6	Alpha Ethniki
1982–83	(Greece) Dimitris Pittas	7	Alpha Ethniki
1983–84	(Greece) Thanasis Liolios / (Greece) Kostas Batsinilas	9	Alpha Ethniki
1984–85	(Greece) Kostas Batsinilas	12	Alpha Ethniki
1985–86	(Greece) Konstantinos Tsouktsos	5	Alpha Ethniki
1986–87	(Greece) Konstantinos Tsouktsos	7	Alpha Ethniki
1987–88	(Greece) Panagiotis Kottidis	8	Alpha Ethniki
1988–89	(Greece) Panagiotis Kottidis / (Greece) Vassilis Lyris	5	Alpha Ethniki
1989–90	(Greece) Panagiotis Kottidis	5	Alpha Ethniki
1990–91	(Greece) Charis Sofianos	14	Beta Ethniki
1991–92	(Greece) Giannis Anastasiou	6	Alpha Ethniki
1992–93	(Greece) Vasilis Xanthis	9	Beta Ethniki
1994–95	(Greece) Giannis Kamitsis	8	Alpha Ethniki
1995–96	(Greece) Andreas Niniadis	12	Alpha Ethniki
1997–98	(Greece) Lysandros Georgamlis	5	Alpha Ethniki
1998–99	(Greece) Pantelis Koubis / (Republic of Ireland) Dominic Foley	3	Alpha Ethniki
1999–2000	(Greece) Giorgos Papandreou	12	Beta Ethniki
2000–01	(Greece) Giorgos Vaitsis	14	Gamma Ethniki
2001–02	(Greece) Giorgos Kiourkos	10	Gamma Ethniki
2002–03	(Greece) Mitsis	15	Gamma Ethniki
2003–04	(Greece) Klinakis	10	Delta Ethniki
2004–05	(Greece) Stathis Karamalikis	11	Gamma Ethniki
2005–06	(Greece) Stathis Karamalikis	12	Gamma Ethniki
2006–07	(Greece) Dimitris Nalitzis	5	Beta Ethniki
2007–08	(Chile) José Luis Jerez	6	Beta Ethniki
2008–09	(Chile) José Luis Jerez / (Portugal) Marco Ferreira	4	Beta Ethniki
2009–10	(Brazil) Chumbinho / (Brazil) Rodrigo	13	Beta Ethniki
2010–11	(Brazil) Lucas Pereira	6	Beta Ethniki
2011–12	(Greece) Panagiotis Skaftouros	9	Delta Ethniki
2012–13	(Greece) Panagiotis Pavlopoulos	18	Piraeus Regional Championship
2013–14	(Greece) Argyris Samios	20	Piraeus Regional Championship
2014–15	(Greece) Giannis Lazanas	5	Gamma Ethniki
2015–16	(Greece) Alexandros Souflas	12	Gamma Ethniki
2016–17	(Greece) Makis Pavlakis	9	Gamma Ethniki
2017–18	(Greece) Nikolaos Katsikokeris	10	Gamma Ethniki
2018–19	(Greece) Georgios Manalis	8	Gamma Ethniki
2019–20	(Albania) Aurel Gjeci	5	Gamma Ethniki
2020–21	(Greece) Makridis / Pechlivanidis	2	Gamma Ethniki
2021–22	(Greece) Charis Samios	7	Gamma Ethniki
2022–23	(Greece) Charis Samios	5	Gamma Ethniki
2023–24	(Greece) Spyros Georgousis	14	Gamma Ethniki
2024–25	(Greece) Themis Potouridis	22	Gamma Ethniki

=== Managers by season (1960–) ===
Name	Period	League
(Austria) Lukas Aurednik	1962–63	Alpha Ethniki
(Austria) Franz Rybicki	1966–67	Alpha Ethniki
(England) Vic Buckingham	1968	Alpha Ethniki
(Socialist Federal Republic of Yugoslavia) Miljan Zeković	1969–70	Alpha Ethniki
(England) John Mortimore	1971–72	Alpha Ethniki
(England) Vic Buckingham	1973–75	Alpha Ethniki
(Italy) Amos Mariani	1976–77	Alpha Ethniki
(England) Frank Blunstone	1979–80	Alpha Ethniki
(England) Bob Hatton	1980	Alpha Ethniki
(West Germany) Heinz Höher	1980	Alpha Ethniki
(Bulgaria) Manol Manolov	1980–81	Alpha Ethniki
(Bulgaria) Manol Manolov	1981	Alpha Ethniki
(Greece) Nikos Stribelis	1981–82	Alpha Ethniki
(England) Alan Dicks	1982–83	Alpha Ethniki
(Socialist Federal Republic of Yugoslavia) Velibor Vasović	1983	Alpha Ethniki
(Greece) Andreas Antonatos	1983	Alpha Ethniki
(Poland) Kazimierz Gorski	1983–85	Alpha Ethniki
(England) Richie Barker	1985–86	Alpha Ethniki
(Austria) Walter Skocik	1986	Alpha Ethniki
(Czechoslovakia) Pietr Packert	1986–88	Alpha Ethniki
(Czechoslovakia) Pietr Packert	1988	Alpha Ethniki
(Greece) Antonis Georgiadis	1988	Alpha Ethniki
(Czechoslovakia) Pietr Packert	1989	Alpha Ethniki
(Greece) Ioannis Kyrastas	1990–91	Beta Ethniki
(Greece) Spyros Livathinos	1990–91	Beta Ethniki
(Austria) Walter Skocik	1991–92	Alpha Ethniki
(Greece) Spyros Livathinos	1992–93	Beta Ethniki
(Bosnia and Herzegovina) Nenad Starovlah	1994	Alpha Ethniki
(Greece) Ioannis Kyrastas	1994–95	Beta Ethniki
(Greece) Ioannis Kyrastas	1995–96	Alpha Ethniki
(Greece) Kostas Tsagkalidis	1996	Alpha Ethniki
(Germany) Timo Zahnleiter	1996	Beta Ethniki
(Greece) Stathis Aslanoglou	1996	Beta Ethniki
(Greece) Giannis Pathiakakis	1997	Beta Ethniki
(Greece) Stathis Stathopoulos	1997	Alpha Ethniki
(Socialist Federal Republic of Yugoslavia) Todor Veselinović	1997–98	Alpha Ethniki
(Greece) Nikos Alefantos	1998	Alpha Ethniki
(Greece) Giorgos Ioakeimidis	1998	Alpha Ethniki
(Greece) Christos Papachristou	1998	Alpha Ethniki
(Greece) Lysandros Georgamlis	1998	Alpha Ethniki
(England) Howard Kendall	1998–99	Alpha Ethniki
(Greece) Dimitris Georgaras	2003–04	Delta Ethniki
(Greece) Giannis Gaitatzis	2003–04	Delta Ethniki
(Greece) Giannis Gaitatzis	2004–05	Gamma Ethniki
(Greece) Makis Vavilis	2004–05	Gamma Ethniki
(Greece) Nikos Goulis	2004–05	Gamma Ethniki
(Greece) Nikos Goulis	2005–06	Gamma Ethniki
(Greece) Nikos Goulis	2006–07	Beta Ethniki
(Greece) Lysandros Georgamlis	2006–07	Beta Ethniki
(North Macedonia) Gjoko Hadžievski	2006–07	Beta Ethniki
(Greece) Nikos Goulis	2006–07	Beta Ethniki
(Greece) Nikos Goulis	2007–08	Beta Ethniki
(Greece) Nikos Topoliatis	2007–08	Beta Ethniki
(Portugal) Eurico Gomes	2008–09	Beta Ethniki
(Greece) Michalis Grigoriou	2009–10	Beta Ethniki
(Greece) Nikos Goulis	2010–11	Beta Ethniki
(Greece) Markos Dimos	2010–11	Beta Ethniki
(Greece) Savvas Pantelidis	2010–11	Beta Ethniki
(Greece) Nikos Pantelis	2010–11	Beta Ethniki
(Greece) Margaritis Chatzialexis	2012–13	Piraeus Regional Championship
(Greece) Margaritis Chatzialexis	2012–14	Piraeus Regional Championship
(Greece) Thymios Georgoulis	2014–15	Gamma Ethniki
(Greece) Nikos Nentidis	2017–18	Gamma Ethniki
(Greece) Nikos Kourbanas	2017–18	Gamma Ethniki
(Greece) Loukas Karadimos	2018–19	Gamma Ethniki
(Armenia) (Greece) Murat Seropian	2019–20	Gamma Ethniki
(Armenia) (Greece) Murat Seropian	2020–21	Gamma Ethniki
(Greece) Paris Konstantakopoulos	2020–21	Gamma Ethniki
(Cape Verde) (Greece) Daniel Batista	2020–21	Gamma Ethniki
(Greece) Theofilos Kalyvas	2021–22	Gamma Ethniki
(Greece) Petros Dimitriou	2021–22	Gamma Ethniki
(Greece) Theofilos Kalyvas	2022–23	Gamma Ethniki
(Greece) Sotiris Tzoumerkiotis	2022–23	Gamma Ethniki
(Greece) Vangelis Chantes	2022–23	Gamma Ethniki
(Greece) Vangelis Chantes	2023–24	Gamma Ethniki
(Greece) Vangelis Chantes	2024–25	Gamma Ethniki
(Greece) Nikos Pantelis	2024–25	Gamma Ethniki
(Greece) Ilias Kolovos	2025–26	Gamma Ethniki
(Greece) Nikos Pantelis	2025–26	Gamma Ethniki
(Greece) Ilias Kotsios	2026–27	Gamma Ethniki
(Greece) Margaritis Chatzialexis	2026–27	Gamma Ethniki
(Greece) Nikos Nentidis	2026–27	Gamma Ethniki

== Notable players ==
- (Greece) Tasos Mitropoulos
- (Greece) Michalis Kapsis
- (Greece) Vasilios Tsiartas
- (Greece) Lysandros Georgamlis
- (Greece) Giannis Anastasiou
- (Greece) Michalis Kritikopoulos
- (Greece) Dimitris Seitaridis
- (Greece) Totis Filakouris
- (Greece) Dimitris Nalitzis
- (Greece) Vasilis Vouzas
- (Greece) Nikos Gioutsos
- (Greece) (Romania) Kostas Choumis
- (Greece) Andreas Niniadis
- (Greece) Kostas Tsanas
- (Greece) Ilias Armodoros
- (Greece) Petros Leventakos
- (Greece) Thanasis Intzoglou
- (Greece) Takis Persias
- (Greece) Giorgos Peppes
- (Greece) Petros Xanthopoulos
- (Greece) Christos Kontis
- (Greece) Manolis Papadopoulos
- (Greece) Dionisis Chiotis
- (Greece) Antonis Petropoulos
- (Greece) Giorgos Papandreou
- (Greece) Giorgos Vaitsis
- (Greece) Kostas Pavlopoulos
- (Greece) Giannis Zaradoukas
- (Greece) Kostas Batsinilas
- (Greece) Asterios Giotsas
- (Greece) Vasilis Voutsinas
- (Greece) Dimitris Sialmas
- (Greece) Giorgos Tsifoutis
- (Greece) Antonis Manikas
- (Greece) Nikos Manolas
- (Greece) Yiannis Chelmis
- (Greece) Dimitrios Moutas
- (Greece) Sotiris Liberopoulos
- (Greece) Thanasis Dimopoulos
- (Greece) Giannis Skopelitis
- (Greece) Michalis Grigoriou
- (Greece) Giorgos Moukeas
- (Greece) Stathis Mantalozis
- (Greece) (Portugal) Daniel Batista
- (Cyprus) (Greece) Stavros Papadopoulos
- (United States) (Greece) Andy Papoulias
- (Albania) (Greece) Foto Strakosha
- (Albania) (Greece) Arjan Bellaj
- (Brazil) (Greece) Paolo Farinola
- (Brazil) Giovanni
- (Albania) Armir Grimaj
- (Zaire) Masengo Ilunga
- (West Germany) Thomas Rohrbach
- (Cameroon) Serge Honi
- (Cameroon) Joël Epalle
- (Bulgaria) Georgi Denev
- (Uruguay) Washington Calcaterra
- (Serbia) Zoran Jovičić
- (Norway) Roy Wassberg
- (Socialist Federal Republic of Yugoslavia) Božidar Bandović
- (Socialist Federal Republic of Yugoslavia) Miodrag Medan
- (Socialist Federal Republic of Yugoslavia) Abid Kovačević
- (England) Terry Eccles
- (Poland) Marek Chojnacki
- (Nigeria) Baldwin Bazuaye
- (Republic of Ireland) Dominic Foley
- (Liberia) Solomon Grimes
- (Chile) José Luis Jerez
- (Portugal) Marco Ferreira
- (Romania) Anton Doboș
- (Romania) Ciprian Prodan
- (Argentina) Guillermo Luis Quiroga
- (Argentina) Diego Romano
- (Austria) Jurgen Aurednik
- (Belgium) Nordin Jbari
- (Algeria) Raïs M'Bolhi
- (Togo) Jean-Paul Abalo
- (Burkina Faso) Mamadou Zongo
- (North Macedonia) Filip Despotovski
- (Lithuania) Artūras Rimkevičius
- (Spain) Javier Matilla

== Notable managers ==
- (Greece) Nikos Alefantos
- (Greece) Lysandros Georgamlis
- (Greece) Lakis Petropoulos
- (Greece) Ioannis Kyrastas
- (Greece) Antonis Georgiadis
- (Greece) Savvas Pantelidis
- (Greece) Giannis Pathiakakis
- (Greece) Spyros Livathinos
- (England) Richie Barker
- (Serbia) Todor Veselinović
- (Czech Republic) Pietr Packert
- (Bulgaria) Manol Manolov
- (Poland) Kazimierz Górski
- (Bosnia and Herzegovina) Nenad Starovlah
- (Greece) Panos Markovic
- (Austria) Walter Skocik
- (England) Howard Kendall

== Chairmen ==
- Dimitris Karellas: 1953–1988
- Misidis: 1988–Jan.1989
- Makis Zouboulidis: Jan.1989–1994
- Nikos Pateras / Alekos Giannakopoulos: 1994–1997
- Vasilis Tsiamakis: 1997–1999
- Chrarilaos Psomiadis: 1999
- Belitsios: Jan.2000–2002
- Delimanis: 2002–2003
- Nikos Pirounias: 2004–2011
- Alexis Aggelopoulos: 2011–2017
- Spyros Kotsopoulos: 2017–2019
- Ethnikos OFPF president: 2020–2021
- Dimitris Koulouris: 2021–2022
- Alekos Karydopoulos: 2023–2025
