= Konstantinos Giotas =

Greek footballer

Personal information
- Full name: Konstantinos Giotas
- Date of birth: February 18, 1980 (age 46)
- Place of birth: Trikala, Greece
- Height: 1.81 m (5 ft 11 in)
- Position: Centre back

Youth career
- AO Trikala U21

Senior career*
Years	Team	Apps	(Gls)
2005–2007	Trikala	53	(4)
2007–2009	Anagennisi Karditsas	58	(0)
2009–2011	Trikala	50	(1)
2011–2012	Iraklis Psachna	25	(0)
2012–2013	AEL	19	(0)
2013–2014	Niki Volos	28	(0)
- * Club domestic league appearances and goals

Konstantinos Giotas (Greek: Κωνσταντίνος Γιώτας; born 18 February 1980) is a Greek professional football player who last played as a centre back in the Football League for Niki Volos.
