= Antonis Kablionis =

Greek footballer

Personal information
- Full name: Antonios Kablionis
- Date of birth: 24 October 1991 (age 35)
- Place of birth: Athens, Greece
- Height: 1.74 m (5 ft 9 in)
- Positions: Right back; winger

Youth career
- 2008–2009: Erlangen-Bruck
- 2009–2010: Jahn Regensburg

Senior career*
Years	Team	Apps	(Gls)
2010–2011	Freier TuS Regensburg	8	(2)
2011–2014	AO Chania	54	(2)
2014–2015	Trikala	30	(11)
2015–2016	AEL	0	(0)
2016	→ Pydna Kitros (loan)		
2016	Apollon Larissa	13	(7)
2017	Trikala	8	(0)
2017	Ialysos	4	(0)
2018–2019	Olympiacos Volos	0	(0)
2019	Trikala	1	(0)
2020	Almopos Aridea	6	(3)
2020-	SV Dessau 05	7	(1)
- * Club domestic league appearances and goals as of 4 January 2020

Antonis Kablionis (Greek: Αντώνης Καμπλιώνης; born 24 October 1991) is a Greek professional footballer who plays both as a defender and a winger.

== Career ==
He began his career in Germany in 2008, from the youth team of FSV Erlangen-Bruck, and in 2009 he played for the youth team of SSV Jahn Regensburg in the Under 19 Bundesliga. He competed in 24 games and scored 1 goal. He then moved on and continued his career at Freier TuS Regensburg in the Bayernliga. In the summer of 2011, he signed with the Greek Football League club AO Chania. He competed with the Cretan club for almost 3 years and in August 2014, he signed for A.O. Trikala in the Greek Gamma Ethniki. On 27 August 2015 he signed with AEL. On 1 February 2016 Kablionis was given on loan to Gamma Ethniki club Pydna Kitros until the end of the season.
