= Vangelis Goutis =

Greek footballer

Personal information
- Full name: Evangelos Goutis
- Date of birth: 15 June 1960 (age 66)

Managerial career
- Years: Team
- 2002–2003: Ethnikos Asteras
- 2003: Kerkyra
- 2003: Agios Dimitrios
- 2005: Kallithea (caretaker)
- 2005–2006: Akratitos (assistant)
- 2006: Akratitos (caretaker)
- 2006: Kavala
- 2007: Kallithea
- 2009–2011: Kavala (assistant)
- 2009–2010: → Kavala (caretaker)
- 2011: Kallithea
- 2013: Panarkadikos
- 2014: Vyzas
- 2014–2015: Aiolikos
- 2015: Fostiras
- 2015: Asteras Varis
- 2020–: Kallithea (technical director)

Vangelis Goutis (Greek: Βαγγέλης Γούτης; born 15 June 1960) is a Greek football manager.
