= Christos Pentsas =

Greek footballer

Personal information
- Date of birth: 31 May 1988 (age 38)
- Place of birth: Thessaloniki, Greece
- Height: 1.88 m (6 ft 2 in)
- Position: Forward

Youth career
- –2006: Olympiacos U20

Senior career*
Years	Team	Apps	(Gls)
2006–2007	Olympiacos	0	(0)
2007–2008	Messiniakos	8	(0)
2008–2010	Panthrakikos	4	(0)
2010	Pontioi Katerini	7	(3)
2011	Nafpaktiakos Asteras		
2011	Pontioi Katerini		
2012–2013	Messolonghi		
2014	Trikala		
2014–2015	Kissamikos		
2015	Trikala		
2015–2016	Thesprotos		
2015–2016	Aittitos Spata		
2016–2018	Thesprotos		
2019	Atromitos Sagiadas		
2019–2020	Asteras Petriti		
2020–2021	Thesprotos		
- * Club domestic league appearances and goals as of 17 July 2009

Christos Pentsas (Greek: Χρήστος Πέντσας; born 31 May 1988) is a former Greek footballer who last played for Thesprotos.
