= 2012–13 Ergotelis F.C. season =

Ergotelis
2012–13 season
- Chairman: Giannis Daskalakis
- Manager: Stavros Labrakis (interim)
- Stadium: Pankritio Stadium, Heraklion
- Football League Greece: 2nd
- Greek Cup: First Round
- Top goalscorer: League: Dario Zahora (8); All: Dario Zahora (8)
Home colours	Away colours

The 2012–13 season was Ergotelis' 83rd season in existence and first season in the Football League after the club's latest relegation from the Super League. Ergotelis also participated in the Greek cup, entering the competition in the first round. Despite the club facing one of its most challenging seasons to date, with many of the club's veterans being either released or refusing to follow the team in a lower division, and major shareholders announcing they were stepping down during mid-season, the team managed to secure instant promotion in the Super League, after finishing in second place. This marked the third promotion of the club to the Super League in a period of nine years.

== Players ==
No.	Name	Nationality	Position (s)	Date of Birth (Age)	Signed from	Notes
Goalkeepers
1	Grigorios Athanasiou	(Greece)	GK	9 March 1984 (29)	(Greece) P.O. Atsalenios	
31	Zacharias Kavousakis	(Greece)	GK	11 January 1989 (24)	Youth system	
70	Ioannis Dermitzakis	(Greece)	GK	5 November 1992 (21)	Youth system	
Defenders
3	Dimitris Kotsonis	(Greece)	CB	25 January 1989 (24)	(Greece) Aris	Winter Transfer Window
4	Manolis Kandilakis	(Greece)	CB	4 April 1990 (23)	Youth system	
5	Borislav Jovanović	(Serbia)	CB	16 August 1986 (27)	(Serbia) Inđija	
36	Albi Alla	(Albania) (Greece)	CB	1 February 1993 (20)	Youth system	Winter Transfer Window
6	Vangelis Georgiou	(Greece)	LB	4 November 1988 (24)	(Greece) Anagennisi Epanomi	
24	Minas Pitsos	(Greece)	LB	8 October 1980 (33)	(Greece) OFI	
17	Manolis Tzanakakis	(Greece)	RB	30 April 1992 (21)	Youth system	
Midfielders
22	Chrysovalantis Kozoronis	(Greece)	DM	3 August 1992 (21)	Youth system	
10	Andreas Bouchalakis	(Greece)	CM	5 April 1993 (20)	Youth system	
88	Wellington Pessoa	(Brazil)	CM	18 February 1991 (22)	(Brazil) Quixadá	
21	Bruno Chalkiadakis	(Greece) (Brazil)	CM / RM	7 April 1993 (20)	Youth system	
77	Vasilios Rentzas	(Greece)	CM / RM	16 April 1992 (21)	(Greece) AEL	
33	Leonardo Koutris	(Greece) (Brazil)	CM / LM	23 July 1995 (18)	Youth system	Winter Transfer Window
19	Vasilios Plousis	(Greece)	LM	19 May 1986 (27)	(Greece) Ermis Zoniana	
26	Cheikh Gadiaga	(Senegal)	LM	30 November 1979 (34)	(Cyprus) Ermis Aradippou	
7	Christos Chrysofakis	(Greece)	AM	18 January 1990 (23)	Youth system	
8	Diego Romano	(Argentina)	AM	11 March 1980 (33)	(Argentina) San Martín de Tucumán	
11	Angelos Chanti	(Greece)	AM	7 September 1989 (24)	(Greece) Olympiakos Chersonissos	
16	Loukas Tasigiannis	(Greece) (United States)	AM	18 June 1989 (24)	Free agent	
27	Antonis Bourselis	(Greece)	AM	6 July 1994 (19)	Youth system	Winter Transfer Window
Forwards
14	Giannis Domatas	(Greece)	RW	31 January 1992 (21)	Youth system	
9	Khallil Lambin	(Ivory Coast)	CF	3 August 1992 (21)	(Lebanon) Al Ahed	
20	Dario Zahora	(Croatia)	CF	21 March 1982 (31)	Free agent	
93	Sokratis Evaggelou	(Greece)	CF	21 July 1993 (20)	(Greece) Filoktitis Melivoia	
99	Māris Verpakovskis	(Latvia)	CF	15 October 1979 (34)	(Azerbaijan) Baku	Winter Transfer Window

=== The following players have departed in mid-season ===
23	Konstantinos Protogerakis	(Greece)	DM	19 June 1992 (21)	Youth system	Loaned out
13	Demetris Daskalakis	(Cyprus) (Greece)	CB	18 November 1977 (36)	(Cyprus) Ethnikos Assia	Released

Note: Flags indicate national team as has been defined under FIFA eligibility rules. Players and Managers may hold more than one non-FIFA nationality.

Head coach	Captain	Kit manufacturer	Shirt sponsor
(Greece) Stavros Labrakis (interim)	(Argentina) Diego Romano	Lotto	Lotto

== Transfers ==
=== In ===
Squad #	Position	Player	Transfer Window	Transferred From	Fee	Date
24	DF	(Greece) Minas Pitsos	Summer	(Greece) OFI	Free	8 August 2012
19	MF	(Greece) Vasilios Plousis	Summer	(Greece) Ermis Zoniana	Free	8 August 2012
6	DF	(Greece) Vangelis Georgiou	Summer	(Greece) Anagennisi Epanomi	Free	23 August 2012
20	FW	(Croatia) Dario Zahora	Summer	Free agent	Free	31 August 2012
9	FW	(Ivory Coast) Khallil Lambin	Summer	(Lebanon) Al Ahed	Free	31 August 2012
13	DF	(Cyprus) (Greece) Demetris Daskalakis	Summer	(Cyprus) Ethnikos Assia	Free	31 August 2012
26	MF	(Senegal) Cheikh Gadiaga	Summer	(Cyprus) Ermis Aradippou	Free	6 September 2012
16	MF	(Greece) (United States) Loukas Tasigiannis	Summer	Free agent	Free	7 September 2012
88	MF	(Brazil) Wellington Pessoa	Summer	(Brazil) Quixadá	Free	7 September 2012
99	FW	(Latvia) Māris Verpakovskis	Winter	(Azerbaijan) Baku	Free	31 January 2013
3	DF	(Greece) Dimitris Kotsonis	Winter	(Greece) Aris Thessaloniki	Free	31 January 2013

=== Promoted from youth system ===
Squad #	Position	Player	Date	Signed Until
21	MF	(Greece) Konstantinos Protogerakis	24 May 2012	30 June 2017
22	MF	(Greece) Chrysovalantis Kozoronis	24 May 2012	30 June 2017
14	FW	(Greece) Giannis Domatas	24 May 2012	30 June 2017
36	DF	(Albania) (Greece) Albi Alla	28 January 2013	30 January 2018
27	MF	(Greece) Antonis Bourselis	28 January 2013	30 January 2018
33	MF	(Greece) (Brazil) Leonardo Koutris	28 January 2013	30 January 2016

Total spending: ▼0.000 €

=== Out ===
Position	Player	Transfer Window	Transferred To	Fee	Date
FW	(Uruguay) Sergio Leal	Summer	(Colombia) Deportivo Cali	Free	4 May 2012
MF	(Brazil) Silva Júnior	Summer	Free agent	Released	7 May 2012
MF	(Brazil) (Portugal) Beto	Summer	Free agent	Released	8 May 2012
DF	(Georgia (country)) Giorgi Shashiashvili	Summer	(Georgia (country)) Dila Gori	Free	8 May 2012
GK	(Germany) Sören Pirson	Summer	(Germany) FSV Frankfurt	Free	12 May 2012
DF	(Austria) Mario Hieblinger	Summer	(Austria) LASK Linz	Free	14 May 2012
MF	(Nigeria) (France) Egutu Oliseh	Summer	(Greece) Panthrakikos	Loan return	18 May 2012
MF	(Greece) Michail Fragoulakis	Summer	(Greece) Asteras Tripolis	Free	2 July 2012
FW	(Croatia) Mario Budimir	Summer	(Cyprus) APOEL	Free	4 July 2012
MF	(Greece) Ilias Kyriakidis	Summer	(Bulgaria) Lokomotiv Plovdiv	Free	10 July 2012
DF	(Greece) Lefteris Gialousis	Summer	(Greece) Asteras Tripolis	Free	11 July 2012
FW	(Greece) Nikolaos Karelis	Summer	(Russia) Amkar Perm	Free	31 July 2012
DF	(Greece) Filippos Darlas	Summer	(Greece) Panetolikos	Free	31 July 2012
MF	(Greece) Vasilios Koutsianikoulis	Summer	(Greece) OFI	Free	20 August 2012
FW	(Greece) Nikolaos Katsikokeris	Summer	(Greece) AEK Athens	▲150.000 €	28 August 2012
MF	(Greece) Konstantinos Protogerakis	Winter	(Greece) Episkopi	Loan	31 January 2013
DF	(Cyprus) (Greece) Demetris Daskalakis	Winter	Free agent	Released	1 February 2013

Total income: ▲150.000 €

Expenditure: ▲150.000 €

== Managerial changes ==
Outgoing manager	Manner of departure	Date of vacancy	Position in table	Incoming manager	Date of appointment
(Cyprus) (Serbia) Siniša Gogić	Sacked	16 April 2013	4th	(Greece) Stavros Labrakis (interim)	16 April 2013

== Pre-season and friendlies ==
=== Pre-season friendlies ===
Win Draw Loss

4 August 2012 Friendly	OFI (Greece)	0 – 2	(Greece) Ergotelis	Heraklion, Crete, Greece
			Katsikokeris 42'; Evaggelou 72'	Stadium: Vardinogiannio Athletic Centre

8 August 2012 Friendly	Ergotelis (Greece)	4 – 0	(Greece) P.O. Atsalenios	Heraklion, Crete, Greece
	Romano; Evaggelou			Stadium: Pankritio Stadium, Training Ground

12 August 2012 Friendly	Ergotelis (Greece)	0 – 2	(Greece) Platanias	Heraklion, Crete, Greece
			Aguilera 44'; Tzanis 65'	Stadium: Pankritio Stadium

18 August 2012 Friendly	Ergotelis (Greece)	2 – 0	(Greece) Rouvas	Heraklion, Crete, Greece
	Chanti 6'; Kurti 63'			Stadium: Pankritio Stadium

22 August 2012 Friendly	Episkopi (Greece)	1 – 0	(Greece) Ergotelis	Gallou, Rethymno, Greece
	Triantafyllou 90'			Stadium: DAK Gallou

25 August 2012 Friendly	Ergotelis (Greece)	1 – 1	(Greece) Episkopi	Heraklion, Crete, Greece
	Chanti		Dzeko 20'	Stadium: Pankritio Stadium

29 August 2013 Friendly	Ergotelis (Greece)	1 – 0	(Greece) Chania	Heraklion, Crete, Greece
	Romano 3'			Stadium: Pankritio Stadium, Training Ground

2 September 2012 Friendly	Ergotelis (Greece)	2 – 2	(Greece) Rouvas	Heraklion, Crete, Greece
	Evaggelou 7'; Rentzas 55'		Anifantakis 27', 42'	Stadium: Pankritio Stadium, Training Ground

8 September 2012 Friendly	OFI (Greece)	2 – 2	(Greece) Ergotelis	Heraklion, Crete, Greece
	Vitoros 55'; Souza 58'		Evaggelou 80', 90'	Stadium: Theodoros Vardinogiannis Stadium

15 September 2012 Friendly	Ergotelis (Greece)	3 – 1	(Greece) Giouchtas	Heraklion, Crete, Greece
	Zahora 21'; Domatas 76', 83'		Kastellianakis 44'	Stadium: Pankritio Stadium

22 September 2012 Friendly	AEL Kalloni (Greece)	1 – 0	(Greece) Ergotelis	Mytilene, Greece
	González 20'			Stadium: Mytilene Municipal Stadium

=== Mid-season friendlies ===
Win Draw Loss

27 October 2012 Friendly	Ergotelis (Greece)	1 – 0	(Greece) Irodotos	Heraklion, Crete, Greece
	Lambin 46'			Stadium: Pankritio Stadium, Training Ground

== Competitions ==
=== Overview ===
Competition	Started round	Current position / round	Final position / round	First match	Last match
Football League Greece	2	2nd	2nd	3 October 2012	26 May 2013
Greek Football Cup	First Round	First Round	First Round	24 October 2012	24 October 2012

Last updated: 15 July 2014

== Football League Greece ==
=== League table ===
Pos	Team	Pld	W	D	L	GF	GA	GD	Pts	Promotion or relegation
1	Apollon Smyrnis (C, P)	40	22	9	9	50	29	+21	75	Promotion to Super League
2	Ergotelis (P)	40	21	11	8	42	25	+17	74	Promotion to Super League
3	AEL Kalloni (P)	40	20	13	7	48	22	+26	73 (Note: Head-to-head record: AEL Kalloni: 8 pts, Panetolikos: 4 pts, Olympiacos Volos: 3 pts.)	Promotion to Super League
4	Panetolikos (P)	40	20	13	7	55	23	+32	73	Qualification for promotion play-offs
5	Olympiacos Volos	40	19	16	5	49	23	+26	73	Qualification for promotion play-offs

Source: Football League standings
Rules for classification: 1st points; 2nd head-to-head points; 3rd head-to-head goal difference
(C) Champions; (P) Promoted

=== Results summary ===
Overall								Home						Away					
Pld	W	D	L	GF	GA	GD	Pts	W	D	L	GF	GA	GD	W	D	L	GF	GA	GD
40	21	11	8	42	25	+17	74	14	5	1	24	6	+18	7	6	7	18	19	−1

Last updated: 15 July 2014.
Source: Competitive matches

=== Matches ===
Win Draw Loss

3 October 2012 2	Ergotelis	1 – 0	Doxa Drama	Heraklion, Crete, Greece
16:45	Zahora 51'			Stadium: Pankritio Stadium

6 October 2012 3	Iraklis Psachna	0 – 1	Ergotelis	Psachna, Euboea, Greece
19:00			Zahora 39' (pen.)	Stadium: Psachna Municipal Stadium

10 October 2012 4	Ergotelis	1 – 0	Apollon Smyrnis	Heraklion, Crete, Greece
16:45	Jovanović 79'			Stadium: Pankritio Stadium

14 October 2012 5	Pierikos	1 – 1	Ergotelis	Katerini, Central Macedonia, Greece
19:00	Giazitzoglou 54' (pen.)		Zahora 26'	Stadium: Municipal Stadium of Katerini

20 October 2012 6	Ergotelis	0 – 1	Iraklis	Heraklion, Crete, Greece
15:00			Stefanidis 35' (pen.)	Stadium: Pankritio Stadium

5 November 2012 7	AEL Kalloni	0 – 0	Ergotelis	Mytilene, Greece
16:00				Stadium: Mytilene Municipal Stadium

11 November 2012 8	Ergotelis	2 – 1	Kavala	Heraklion, Crete, Greece
16:30	Zahora 9'; Lambin 18'		Chloros 40'	Stadium: Pankritio Stadium

18 November 2012 9	Vyzas Megara	1 – 1	Ergotelis	Megara, Greece
15:00	Diallo 11'		Gromitsaris 20' (o.g.)	Stadium: Megara Stadium

21 November 2012 10	Ergotelis	0 – 0	Fokikos	Heraklion, Crete, Greece
15:00				Stadium: Pankritio Stadium

26 November 2012 11	AEL	0 – 1	Ergotelis	Larissa, Greece
19:00			Chanti 78'	Stadium: AEL FC Arena

3 December 2012 12	Ergotelis	2 – 1	Kallithea	Heraklion, Crete, Greece
15:00	Bouchalakis 20'; Zahora 29'		D'Acol 60' (pen.)	Stadium: Pankritio Stadium

10 December 2012 13	Panserraikos	2 – 0	Ergotelis	Serres, Greece
19:00	Tsoutsis 2'; Bangoura 90+2'			Stadium: Serres Municipal Stadium

16 December 2012 14	Anagennisi Epanomi	1 – 2	Ergotelis	Epanomi, Thessaloniki, Greece
15:00	Papatzikos 60'		Romano 72'; Bouchalakis 86'	Stadium: "Nikos Sarafis" Stadium

6 January 2013 15	Ergotelis	4 – 1	Anagennisi Giannitsa	Heraklion, Crete, Greece
15:00	Pitsos 50'; Bouchalakis 53'; Chanti 81'; Zahora 90'		Chatzoglou 10'	Stadium: Pankritio Stadium

13 January 2013 16	Olympiacos Volos	2 – 0	Ergotelis	Volos, Greece
15:00	Pindonis 71'; Ogunsoto 73'			Stadium: Panthessaliko Stadium

21 January 2013 17	Ergotelis	2 – 1	Panetolikos	Heraklion, Crete, Greece
19:00	Gadiaga 15'; Romano 26'		Favalli 22'	Stadium: Pankritio Stadium

27 January 2013 18	Ethnikos Gazoros	0 – 1	Ergotelis	Serres, Greece
18:00			Pitsos 51'	Stadium: Serres Municipal Stadium

3 February 2013 19	Ergotelis	1 – 0	Panachaiki	Heraklion, Crete, Greece
17:00	Chanti 85'			Stadium: Pankritio Stadium

6 February 2013 20	Thrasyvoulos	0 – 1	Ergotelis	Fyli, Greece
15:00			Romano 5'	Stadium: Fyli Stadium

10 February 2013 21	Ergotelis	0 – 0	Niki Volos	Heraklion, Crete, Greece
15:00				Stadium: Pankritio Stadium

20 February 2013 23	Doxa Drama	1 – 0	Ergotelis	Drama, Greece
15:00	Poulakos 87'			Stadium: Doxa Dramas Stadium

25 February 2013 24	Ergotelis	1 – 0	Iraklis Psachna	Heraklion, Crete, Greece
15:00	Lambin 90'			Stadium: Pankritio Stadium

4 March 2013 25	Apollon Smyrnis	2 – 1	Ergotelis	Rizoupoli, Athens, Greece
19:00	Katsikis 20'; Manias 27'		Lambin 49'	Stadium: Georgios Kamaras Stadium

9 March 2013 26	Ergotelis	2 – 1	Pierikos	Heraklion, Crete, Greece
15:00	Lambin 54'; Romano 56'		Apostolidis 80'	Stadium: Pankritio Stadium

13 March 2013 27	Iraklis	1 – 1	Ergotelis	Thessaloniki, Greece
19:00	Vangelopoulos 90+6'		Kozoronis 83'	Stadium: Kaftanzoglio Stadium

17 March 2013 28	Ergotelis	0 – 0	AEL Kalloni	Heraklion, Crete, Greece
15:00				Stadium: Pankritio Stadium

24 March 2013 29	Kavala	0 – 0	Ergotelis	Kavala, Greece
15:00				Stadium: Anthi Karagianni Stadium

27 March 2013 30	Ergotelis	1 – 0	Vyzas Megara	Heraklion, Crete, Greece
15:00	Domatas 82'			Stadium: Pankritio Stadium

31 March 2013 31	Fokikos	2 – 1	Ergotelis	Amfissa, Greece
16:00	Loukinas 69', 80'		Bouchalakis 35'	Stadium: Amfissa Municipal Stadium

7 April 2013 32	Ergotelis	0 – 0	AEL	Heraklion, Crete, Greece
16:30				Stadium: Pankritio Stadium

10 April 2013 33	Kallithea	2 – 1	Ergotelis	Kallithea, Athens, Greece
16:00	D'Acol 35' (pen.); Faye 65'		Chanti 64'	Stadium: Grigoris Lambrakis Stadium

15 April 2013 34	Ergotelis	0 – 0	Panserraikos	Heraklion, Crete, Greece
16:00				Stadium: Pankritio Stadium

20 April 2013 35	Ergotelis	2 – 0	Anagennisi Epanomi	Heraklion, Crete, Greece
16:00	Chrysofakis 16'; Domatas 59'			Stadium: Pankritio Stadium

24 April 2013 36	Anagennisi Giannitsa	1 – 2	Ergotelis	Giannitsa, Greece
15:00	Kyriakidis 40'		Zahora 16'; Georgiou 27'	Stadium: Giannitsa Stadium

29 April 2013 37	Ergotelis	2 – 0	Olympiacos Volos	Heraklion, Crete, Greece
16:30	Verpakovskis 28', 67' (pen.)			Stadium: Pankritio Stadium

10 May 2013 38	Panetolikos	1 – 0	Ergotelis	Agrinio, Greece
18:00	Šišić 43'			Stadium: Panetolikos Stadium

15 May 2013 39	Ergotelis	1 – 0	Ethnikos Gazoros	Heraklion, Crete, Greece
16:00	Bouchalakis 18'			Stadium: Pankritio Stadium

19 May 2013 40	Panachaiki	1 – 3	Ergotelis	Agyia, Patras, Greece
18:00	Vasilantonopoulos 40'		Romano 41'; Bouchalakis 43' (pen.); Kozoronis 76'	Stadium: Kostas Davourlis Stadium

22 May 2013 41	Ergotelis	2 – 0	Thrasyvoulos	Heraklion, Crete, Greece
18:00	Romano 45'; Zahora 65'			Stadium: Pankritio Stadium

26 May 2013 42	Niki Volos	1 – 1	Ergotelis	Volos, Greece
18:00	Pappas 31'		Verpakovskis 77'	Stadium: Panthessaliko Stadium

== Greek Cup ==
Win Draw Loss

24 October 2012 First round	Aiginiakos	1–1 (a.e.t.) (6–5 p)	Ergotelis	Aiginio
14:30 UTC+2	Platakis 10'	Report	Domatas 81'	Stadium: Aiginio Municipal Stadium; Referee: Apostolos Simeakis (Chalkidiki)
	Penalties
	Apostolidis (penalty scored); Mitrakas (penalty scored); Savvidis (penalty missed); Exarchos (penalty scored); Provatidis (penalty scored); Giaoutzis (penalty scored); Achalinopoulos (penalty scored)		(penalty scored) Georgiou; (penalty scored) Chanti; (penalty missed) Sarris; (penalty scored) Tzanakakis; (penalty scored) Lambin; (penalty scored) Domatas; (penalty missed) Wellington

== Statistics ==
=== Goal scorers ===
No.	Pos.	Nation	Name	Football League Greece	Greek Cup	Total
20	FW	(Croatia)	Dario Zahora	8	0	8
8	MF	(Argentina)	Diego Romano	6	0	6
10	MF	(Greece)	Andreas Bouchalakis	6	0	6
9	FW	(Ivory Coast)	Khallil Lambin	4	0	4
11	MF	(Greece)	Angelos Chanti	4	0	4
99	FW	(Latvia)	Māris Verpakovskis	3	0	3
14	FW	(Greece)	Giannis Domatas	2	1	3
22	MF	(Greece)	Chrysovalantis Kozoronis	2	0	2
24	DF	(Greece)	Minas Pitsos	2	0	2
7	MF	(Greece)	Christos Chrysofakis	1	0	1
5	DF	(Serbia)	Borislav Jovanović	1	0	1
26	MF	(Senegal)	Cheikh Gadiaga	1	0	1
6	DF	(Greece)	Vangelis Georgiou	1	0	1
-	-	-	Opponent's own Goals	1	0	1
TOTAL				42	1	43

Last updated: 22 July 2014
