= 2013–14 Ergotelis F.C. season =

Ergotelis
2013–14 season
- Chairman: Giannis Daskalakis
- Manager: Marinos Ouzounidis
- Stadium: Pankritio Stadium, Heraklion
- Super League Greece: 7th
- Greek Cup: Second Round
- Top goalscorer: League: Dimitrios Diamantakos (9); All: Dimitrios Diamantakos (10)
- Highest home attendance: 3,860 vs OFI (17 February 2014)
- Lowest home attendance: 1,202 vs AEL Kalloni (13 April 2014)
- Average home league attendance: 1,550
Home colours	Away colours	Third colours

The 2013–14 season was Ergotelis' 84th season in existence, 8th season in the Super League Greece, and the first since the club's latest promotion from the Football League. Ergotelis also participated in the Greek cup, entering the competition in the Second Round. The team managed to secure its participation in next year's season with relative ease, while also achieving a record 44 points on the table, finishing in the 7th place. This is the best finish in the club's history in the Super League.

== Players ==
No.	Name	Nationality	Position (s)	Date of birth (age)	Signed from	Notes
Goalkeepers
1	Grigorios Athanasiou	(Greece)	GK	9 March 1984 (30)	(Greece) P.O. Atsalenios	
31	Zacharias Kavousakis	(Greece)	GK	11 January 1989 (25)	Youth System	
38	Vladimir Stojković	(Serbia)	GK	28 July 1983 (30)	(Serbia) Partizan	Winter Transfer Window
70	Ioannis Dermitzakis	(Greece)	GK	5 November 1992 (21)	Youth System	
Defenders
2	Ayodele Adeleye	(Nigeria)	CB	25 December 1988 (25)	(Russia) Anzhi	Winter Transfer Window
5	Borislav Jovanović	(Serbia)	CB	16 August 1986 (27)	(Serbia) Inđija	
6	Álvaro Mejía	(Spain)	CB	18 January 1982 (32)	(Spain) Almería	
32	Epaminondas Pantelakis	(Greece)	CB	10 February 1995 (19)	Youth System	
89	Georgios Sarris	(Greece)	CB	8 September 1989 (24)	Youth System	
3	Ioannis Kiliaras	(Greece)	LB / LM	9 June 1988 (26)	(Greece) Panachaiki	
13	Aziz Deen-Conteh	(Sierra Leone) (England)	LB	14 January 1993 (21)	(England) Chelsea	
24	Minas Pitsos	(Greece)	LB	8 October 1980 (33)	(Greece) OFI	
17	Manolis Tzanakakis	(Greece)	RB	30 April 1992 (22)	(Greece) Olympiacos	On loan
Midfielders
18	Christos Kasapakis	(Greece)	DM	9 December 1993 (20)	(Greece) Panathinaikos	
22	Chrysovalantis Kozoronis	(Greece)	DM	3 August 1992 (21)	Youth System	
10	Andreas Bouchalakis	(Greece)	CM	5 April 1993 (21)	(Greece) Olympiacos	On loan
12	Horacio Cardozo	(Argentina) (Italy)	CM	29 November 1979 (34)	(Cyprus) Apollon Limassol	
25	Abdisalam Ibrahim	(Norway)	CM	4 May 1991 (23)	(Greece) Olympiacos	On loan, Winter Transfer Window
77	Vasilios Rentzas	(Greece)	CM / RM	16 April 1992 (22)	(Greece) AEL	
33	Leonardo Koutris	(Greece) (Brazil)	CM / LM	23 July 1995 (18)	Youth System	
37	František Kubík	(Slovakia)	CM / LM	14 March 1989 (25)	(Ukraine) Arsenal Kyiv	Winter Transfer Window
8	Diego Romano	(Argentina)	AM	11 March 1980 (34)	(Argentina) San Martín de Tucumán	
11	Angelos Chanti	(Greece)	AM	7 September 1989 (24)	(Greece) Olympiakos Chersonissos	
Forwards
39	Ziguy Badibanga	(Belgium) (Democratic Republic of the Congo)	RW	26 November 1991 (22)	(Belgium) Anderlecht	
16	Dimitrios Diamantakos	(Greece)	CF	5 March 1993 (21)	(Greece) Olympiacos	On loan
19	Michalis Kouiroukidis	(Greece)	CF	18 January 1995 (19)	(Greece) AO Glyfada	
23	Ilias Anastasakos	(Greece)	CF	3 March 1978 (36)	(Greece) Platanias	
47	Marcos Bambam	(Brazil)	CF	19 March 1991 (23)	(Brazil) Grêmio B	Anterior cruciate ligament injury (injured) Source
73	Gaetano Monachello	(Italy)	CF	3 March 1994 (20)	(France) Monaco	On loan, Winter Transfer Window

=== The following players have departed in mid-season ===
4	Pelé	(Portugal)	CM	14 September 1987 (26)	Free agent	Transferred
7	Christos Chrysofakis	(Greece)	AM	18 January 1990 (24)	Youth System	Loaned out
88	Wellington Pessoa	(Brazil)	CM	18 February 1991 (23)	(Brazil) Quixadá	Loaned out
93	Sokratis Evangelou	(Greece)	CF	21 July 1993 (20)	(Greece) Filoktitis Melivoia	Loaned out
28	Antonis Bourselis	(Greece)	CF	6 July 1994 (19)	Youth System	Loaned out
9	Māris Verpakovskis	(Latvia)	CF	15 October 1979 (34)	(Azerbaijan) Baku	End of career
44	Konstantinos Rougalas	(Greece)	CB	13 October 1993 (20)	(Greece) Olympiacos	Loan return
14	Giannis Domatas	(Greece)	CF	31 January 1992 (22)	Youth System	Loaned out

=== Out of team ===
21	Bruno Chalkiadakis	(Greece) (Brazil)	CM / RM	7 April 1993 (21)	Youth System	AWOL since 18 January 2014, suspended

Note: Flags indicate national team as has been defined under FIFA eligibility rules. Players and Managers may hold more than one non-FIFA nationality.

Head coach	Captain	Kit manufacturer	Shirt sponsor
(Greece) Marinos Ouzounidis	(Argentina) Diego Romano	Eye Sportwear	Lotto

== Transfers ==
=== In ===
Squad #	Position	Transfer Window	Player	Transferred From	Fee	Date
N/A	MF	(Greece) Konstantinos Protogerakis	Summer	(Greece) Episkopi	Loan return	1 July 2013
18	MF	(Greece) Christos Kasapakis	Summer	(Greece) Panathinaikos	Free	1 July 2013
23	FW	(Greece) Ilias Anastasakos	Summer	(Greece) Platanias	Free	3 July 2013
12	MF	(Argentina) (Italy) Horacio Cardozo	Summer	(Cyprus) Apollon Limassol	Free	11 July 2013
19	FW	(Greece) Michalis Kouiroukidis	Summer	(Greece) AO Glyfada	Free	18 July 2013
39	FW	(Belgium) (Democratic Republic of the Congo) Ziguy Badibanga	Summer	(Belgium) Anderlecht	Free	18 July 2013
17	DF	(Greece) Manolis Tzanakakis	Summer	(Greece) Olympiacos	Loan	18 July 2013
10	MF	(Greece) Andreas Bouchalakis	Summer	(Greece) Olympiacos	Loan	2 August 2013
47	FW	(Brazil) Marcos Bambam	Summer	(Brazil) Grêmio B	Free	6 August 2013
3	DF	(Greece) Ioannis Kiliaras	Summer	(Greece) Panachaiki	Free	9 August 2013
4	MF	(Portugal) Pelé	Summer	Free agent	Free	13 August 2013
16	FW	(Greece) Dimitrios Diamantakos	Summer	(Greece) Olympiacos	Loan	23 August 2013
13	DF	(Sierra Leone) (England) Aziz Deen-Conteh	Summer	(England) Chelsea	Free	27 August 2013
6	DF	(Spain) Álvaro Mejía	Summer	(Spain) Almería	Free	29 August 2013
44	CB	(Greece) Konstantinos Rougalas	Summer	(Greece) Olympiacos	Loan	2 September 2013
N/A	FW	(Greece) Sokratis Evaggelou	Winter	(Greece) Tyrnavos	Loan return	1 January 2014
25	GK	(Slovakia) František Kubík	Winter	(Ukraine) Arsenal Kyiv	Free	16 January 2014
25	GK	(Norway) Abdisalam Ibrahim	Winter	(Greece) Olympiacos	Loan	24 January 2014
38	GK	(Serbia) Vladimir Stojković	Winter	(Serbia) Partizan	Free	25 January 2014
2	CB	(Nigeria) Ayodele Adeleye	Winter	(Russia) Anzhi	Free	29 January 2014
73	FW	(Italy) Gaetano Monachello	Winter	(France) Monaco	Loan	30 January 2014

=== Promoted from youth system ===
Squad #	Position	Player	Date	Signed Until
32	DF	(Greece) Epaminondas Pantelakis	23 August 2013	30 June 2018

Total spending: ▼0.000 €

=== Out ===
Position	Player	Transfer Window	Transferred To	Fee	Date
MF	(Greece) (United States) Loukas Tasigiannis	Summer	Free agent	Released	1 July 2013
MF	(Greece) Vasilios Plousis	Summer	(Greece) Ermis Zoniana	Free	1 July 2013
DF	(Greece) Manolis Tzanakakis	Summer	(Greece) Olympiacos	Free	1 July 2013
MF	(Greece) Andreas Bouchalakis	Summer	(Greece) Olympiacos	▲200.000 €	1 July 2013
FW	(Croatia) Dario Zahora	Summer	(Greece) Iraklis	Free	4 July 2013
DF	(Greece) Dimitris Kotsonis	Summer	(Greece) Paniliakos	Free	9 July 2013
MF	(Greece) Konstantinos Protogerakis	Summer	(Greece) P.O. Atsalenios	Loan	22 July 2013
DF	(Greece) Manolis Kandilakis	Summer	(Greece) Ermis Zoniana	Free	1 August 2013
FW	(Ivory Coast) Khallil Lambin	Summer	(England) Sheffield Wednesday	Free	12 August 2013
FW	(Greece) Sokratis Evaggelou	Summer	(Greece) Tyrnavos	Loan	13 August 2013
DF	(Albania) (Greece) Albi Alla	Summer	(Greece) Fokikos	Loan	24 August 2013
MF	(Senegal) Cheikh Gadiaga	Summer	(Greece) Panachaiki	Free	31 August 2013
DF	(Greece) Vangelis Georgiou	Summer	(Greece) Aiginiakos	Free	31 August 2013
MF	(Portugal) Pelé	Winter	(Greece) Olympiacos	▲500.000 €	1 January 2014
MF	(Greece) Christos Chrysofakis	Winter	(Greece) Panegialios	Loan	2 January 2014
MF	(Brazil) Wellington Pessoa	Winter	(Greece) Panelefsiniakos	Loan	14 January 2014
FW	(Greece) Sokratis Evaggelou	Winter	(Greece) Ermis Zoniana	Loan	14 January 2014
FW	(Greece) Antonis Bourselis	Winter	(Greece) P.A.O. Krousonas	Loan	15 January 2014
FW	(Latvia) Māris Verpakovskis	Winter	Free agent	End of career	28 January 2014
CB	(Greece) Konstantinos Rougalas	Winter	(Greece) Olympiacos	Loan return	29 January 2014
FW	(Greece) Giannis Domatas	Winter	(Greece) Asteras Magoula	Loan	30 January 2014

Total income: ▲700.000 €

Expenditure: ▲700.000 €

== Managerial changes ==
Outgoing manager	Manner of departure	Date of vacancy	Position in table	Incoming manager	Date of appointment
(Greece) Stavros Labrakis (interim)	Head coach appointment	30 June 2013	--	(Greece) Ioannis Petrakis	14 June 2013
(Greece) Ioannis Petrakis	Mutual Consent	13 January 2014	14th	(Greece) Marinos Ouzounidis	17 January 2014
(Greece) Marinos Ouzounidis	Mutual Consent	14 May 2014	7th	Vacant	--

== Pre-season and friendlies ==
=== Pre-season friendlies ===
Win Draw Loss

19 July 2013 Friendly	Apollon Smyrnis (Greece)	2 – 1	(Greece) Ergotelis	Naousa, Greece
18:00	Alvarez 6'; Barkoglou 61'		Kozoronis 19'

22 July 2013 Friendly	Panionios (Greece)	1 – 1	(Greece) Ergotelis	Naousa, Greece
18:00	Lambropoulos 77'		Chanti 62'

24 July 2013 Friendly	Ergotelis (Greece)	2 – 0	(Greece) PAOK U20	Naousa, Greece
18:00	Verpakovskis 34'; Bambam 74'

25 July 2013 Friendly	Ergotelis (Greece)	3 – 2	(Greece) Veria	Naousa, Greece
18:00	Jovanović 18'; Chanti 30', 72'		Mrdaković 22' (pen.); Bargan 41'

3 August 2013 Friendly	Ergotelis (Greece)	2 – 1	(Greece) Platanias	Heraklion, Crete, Greece
18:30	Bambam 1'; Chanti 79'		Goundoulakis 45'	Stadium: Pankritio Stadium

4 August 2013 Friendly	Ergotelis (Greece)	1 – 1	(Greece) P.O. Atsalenios	Heraklion, Crete, Greece
18:30	Verpakovskis 31'		Giakoumakis 1'	Stadium: Pankritio Stadium Training Ground

10 August 2013 Friendly	Platanias (Greece)	2 – 0	(Greece) Ergotelis	Chania, Crete, Greece
19:15	Fernandes 32'; Tetteh 87' (pen.)			Stadium: Perivolia Municipal Stadium

11 August 2013 Friendly	Ergotelis (Greece)	1 – 0	(Greece) Kissamikos	Heraklion, Crete, Greece
18:15	Kouiroukidis 52'			Stadium: Pankritio Stadium

=== Mid-season friendlies ===
Win Draw Loss

18 August 2013 Friendly	Ergotelis (Greece)	6 – 0	(Greece) Episkopi	Heraklion, Crete, Greece
18:00	Domatas 35', 56'; Verpakovskis 41' (pen.), 83'; Chrysofakis 62'; Kiliaras 75'			Stadium: Pankritio Stadium

2 September 2013 Friendly	Ergotelis (Greece)	5 – 0	(Greece) P.A.O. Krousonas	Heraklion, Crete, Greece
18:00	Domatas 28'; Romano 30', 82'; Diamantakos 39'; Makatounakis 72' (o.g.)			Stadium: Pankritio Stadium

6 September 2013 Friendly	Ergotelis (Greece)	2 – 2	(Greece) Chania	Heraklion, Crete, Greece
17:30	Chanti 44' (pen.); Chalkiadakis 89'		Pangalos 47', 52'	Stadium: Pankritio Stadium

7 September 2013 Friendly	Ergotelis (Greece)	3 – 0	(Greece) Irodotos	Heraklion, Crete, Greece
17:30	Pitsos 12'; Domatas 33'; Chrysofakis 69'			Stadium: Pankritio Stadium

12 October 2013 Friendly	Ergotelis (Greece)	5 – 0	(Greece) Ermis Zoniana	Heraklion, Crete, Greece
18:00	Domatas 9'; Pelé 30', 56'; Chanti 35'; Wellington			Stadium: Pankritio Stadium

29 December 2013 Friendly	Ergotelis (Greece)	0 – 1	(Greece) Platanias	Heraklion, Crete, Greece
16:00			Mendrinos 9' (pen.)	Stadium: Pankritio Stadium, Training Ground

=== Post-season friendlies ===
Win Draw Loss

30 April 2014 Friendly	Platanias (Greece)	2 – 2	(Greece) Ergotelis	Chania, Crete, Greece
18:00	Cerra 19'; Torres 71'		Jovanović 64'; Kozoronis 90'	Stadium: Perivolia Municipal Stadium

== Competitions ==
=== Overview ===
Competition	Started round	Current position / round	Final position / round	First match	Last match
Super League Greece	1	7th	7th	17 August	13 April
Greek Football Cup	Second Round	Second Round	Second Round	25 September	30 October

Last updated: 24 April 2014

== Super League Greece ==
=== League table ===
Pos	Team	Pld	W	D	L	GF	GA	GD	Pts	Qualification or relegation
5	Asteras Tripolis	34	16	10	8	46	35	+11	58	Qualification for the Play-offs
6	OFI	34	11	11	12	30	39	−9	44 (Note: Head-to-head points: OFI 4, Ergotelis 1.)	
7	Ergotelis	34	11	11	12	39	40	−1	44	
8	Panetolikos	34	11	9	14	32	33	−1	42 (Note: Head-to-head points (goal difference): Levadiakos 3 (0), Panetolikos 3 (0).)	
9	Levadiakos	34	13	3	18	42	61	−19	42	

Source: Super League Greece
Rules for classification: 1) Points; 2) Head-to-head points; 3) Head-to-head goal difference; 4) Goals scored; 5) Goals against; 6) Play-offs (neutral ground).
(Note: Criteria 6 is only used if needed to decide champion, teams for relegation or teams for UEFA competitions).
If in final league table there are still tied teams after applying criteria 1 to 5, a decision match (or matches if they are more than two) are to be played but only in three cases: to determine the champion, to fill spots in the play-off or to determine the teams to be relegated. In any other case, the final standings of tied teams are determined with a public draw.

=== Results summary ===
Overall								Home						Away					
Pld	W	D	L	GF	GA	GD	Pts	W	D	L	GF	GA	GD	W	D	L	GF	GA	GD
34	11	11	12	39	40	−1	44	6	5	6	25	22	+3	5	6	6	14	18	−4

Last updated: 17 February 2014.
Source: Competitive matches

=== Matches ===
Win Draw Loss

17 August 2013 1	Atromitos	2 – 2	Ergotelis	Peristeri
19:15	Umbides 26'; Papadopoulos 87'		Badibanga 8'; Anastasakos 36'	Stadium: Peristeri Stadium; Attendance: 668; Referee: Aristomenis Koutsiaftis

26 August 2013 2	Ergotelis	2 – 0	Levadiakos	Heraklion
21:30	Anastasakos 46'; Bambam 51'			Stadium: Pankritio Stadium; Attendance: 1,531; Referee: Anastasios Papapetrou

31 August 2013 3	Skoda Xanthi	0 – 0	Ergotelis	Xanthi
19:15				Stadium: Skoda Xanthi Arena; Attendance: 1,276; Referee: Anastasios Kakos

14 September 2013 4	Panetolikos	0 – 0	Ergotelis	Agrinio
16:00				Stadium: Panetolikos Stadium; Attendance: 2,958; Referee: Stavros Tritsonis

22 September 2013 5	Ergotelis	1 – 1	Panionios	Heraklion
18:15	Bambam 61'		Aravidis 90+1' (pen.)	Stadium: Pankritio Stadium; Attendance: 1,285; Referee: Alexandros Dimitropoulos

28 September 2013 6	Veria	0 – 1	Ergotelis	Thessaloniki
18:15			Chanti 51' (pen.)	Stadium: Kaftanzoglio Stadium; Attendance: 620; Referee: Ilias Spathas

5 October 2013 7	Ergotelis	3 – 1	Platanias	Heraklion
18:15	Diamantakos 36'; Pelé 40'; Romano 46'		Torres 66'	Stadium: Pankritio Stadium; Attendance: 1,385; Referee: Marios Lambropoulos

20 October 2013 8	OFI	1 – 1	Ergotelis	Heraklion
18:15	Papazoglou 41'		Diamantakos 28'	Stadium: Theodoros Vardinogiannis Stadium; Attendance: 4,968; Referee: Ioannis Kambaxis

26 October 2013 9	Ergotelis	0 – 2	Panathinaikos	Heraklion
19:30			Figueroa 83'; Koutroumpis 90+3'	Stadium: Pankritio Stadium; Attendance: 2,642; Referee: Ioannis Topouzis

2 November 2013 10	PAOK	2 – 1	Ergotelis	Thessaloniki
17:15	Katsouranis 64'; Vukić 90+4'		Verpakovskis 13'	Stadium: Toumba Stadium; Attendance: 12,996; Referee: Anastasios Kakos

10 November 2013 11	Ergotelis	3 – 1	Panthrakikos	Heraklion
17:15	Verpakovskis 45+1'; Romano 60'; Diamantakos 90+1'		Tzanis 11'	Stadium: Pankritio Stadium; Attendance: 1,250; Referee: Ioannis Delfakis

24 November 2013 12	Ergotelis	0 – 1	Asteras Tripolis	Heraklion
17:15			Barrales 58'	Stadium: Pankritio Stadium; Attendance: 1,414; Referee: Stefanos Mantakis

1 December 2013 13	Olympiacos	3 – 0	Ergotelis	Piraeus
19:30	Campbell 3'; Olaitan 45+2'; Domínguez 62'			Stadium: Karaiskakis Stadium; Attendance: 14,495; Referee: Alexandros Dimitropoulos

7 December 2013 14	Ergotelis	3 – 3	Aris	Heraklion
15:00	Badibanga 62', 90+5'; Pelé 65'		Tatos 69', 80'; Damarlis 71'	Stadium: Pankritio Stadium; Attendance: 1,396; Referee: Stavros Tritsonis

14 December 2013 15	PAS Giannina	2 – 0	Ergotelis	Ioannina
17:15	De Vincenti 11' (pen.), 51'			Stadium: Zosimades Stadium; Attendance: 1,566; Referee: Ioannis Delfakis

18 December 2013 16	Ergotelis	2 – 2	Apollon Smyrnis	Heraklion
15:00	Badibanga 16'; Pelé 45+3'		Petropoulos 18', 43'	Stadium: Pankritio Stadium; Attendance: 1,209; Referee: Konstantinos Ioannidis

22 December 2013 17	AEL Kalloni	0 – 0	Ergotelis	Athens
17:15				Stadium: Olympic Stadium; Attendance: 100; Referee: Christos Mitsios

4 January 2014 18	Ergotelis	0 – 1	Atromitos	Heraklion
17:15			Karamanos 18'	Stadium: Pankritio Stadium; Attendance: 1,303; Referee: Georgios Kyzas

11 January 2014 19	Levadiakos	2 – 0	Ergotelis	Levadia
17:15	Mantzios 26', 32'			Stadium: Levadia Municipal Stadium; Attendance: 1,365; Referee: Apostolos Abarkiolis

19 January 2014 20	Ergotelis	2 – 2	Skoda Xanthi	Heraklion
17:15	Anastasakos 10', 18'		Solari 23'; Goutas 90+4'	Stadium: Pankritio Stadium; Attendance: 1,505; Referee: Andreas Pappas

27 January 2014 21	Ergotelis	0 – 1	Panetolikos	Heraklion
17:15			Camara 43'	Stadium: Pankritio Stadium; Attendance: 1,211; Referee: Georgios Kominis

2 February 2014 22	Panionios	0 – 1	Ergotelis	Nea Smyrni
17:15			Diamantakos 86'	Stadium: Nea Smyrni Stadium; Attendance: 548; Referee: Georgios Kyzas

5 February 2014 23	Ergotelis	2 – 0	Veria	Heraklion
15:00	Diamantakos 56'; Badibanga 86'			Stadium: Pankritio Stadium; Attendance: 1,252; Referee: Dimitrios Thanos

8 February 2014 24	Platanias	0 – 1	Ergotelis	Chania
15:00			Diamantakos 44'	Stadium: Perivolia Municipal Stadium; Attendance: 1,814; Referee: Ilias Spathas

17 February 2014 25	Ergotelis	0 – 1	OFI	Heraklion
19:30			Dudu 42'	Stadium: Pankritio Stadium; Attendance: 3,860; Referee: Andreas Pappas

23 February 2014 26	Panathinaikos	1 – 1	Ergotelis	Athens
15:00	Pranjić 19'		Badibanga 47'	Stadium: Leoforos Alexandras Stadium; Attendance: 8,702; Referee: Ioannis Delfakis

2 March 2014 27	Ergotelis	2 – 2	PAOK	Heraklion
17:15	Monachello 71'; Kitsiou 81' (o.g.)		Lazăr 2'; Salpingidis 47'	Stadium: Pankritio Stadium; Attendance: 1,859; Referee: Athanasios Giachos

9 March 2014 28	Panthrakikos	2 – 1	Ergotelis	Komotini
17:15	Ben Shabat 20'; Katharios 65'		Bouchalakis 74'	Stadium: Komotini Municipal Stadium; Attendance: 1,233; Referee: Konstantinos Ioannidis

16 March 2014 29	Asteras Tripolis	2 – 3	Ergotelis	Tripoli
17:15	Sankaré 47'; Juanma 68'		Monachello 33'; Chanti 66'; Diamantakos 90' (pen.)	Stadium: Theodoros Kolokotronis Stadium; Attendance: 2,075; Referee: Anastasios Papapetrou

23 March 2014 30	Ergotelis	1 – 4	Olympiacos	Heraklion
19:30	Ibrahim 55'		Valdez 3', 9', 13'; Campbell 32' (pen.)	Stadium: Pankritio Stadium; Attendance: 3,367; Referee: Christos Mitsios

26 March 2014 31	Aris	0 – 2	Ergotelis	Thessaloniki
17:15			Sarris 28'; Diamantakos 30'	Stadium: Kleanthis Vikelidis Stadium; Attendance: 2,731; Referee: Dimitrios Thanos

30 March 2014 32	Ergotelis	1 – 0	PAS Giannina	Heraklion
17:15	Chanti 72' (pen.)			Stadium: Pankritio Stadium; Attendance: 1,290; Referee: Alexandros Aretopoulos

6 April 2014 33	Apollon Smyrnis	1 – 0	Ergotelis	Rizoupoli
19:00	Delizisis 90+4'			Stadium: Georgios Kamaras Stadium; Attendance: 1,575; Referee: Andreas Pappas

13 April 2014 34	Ergotelis	3 – 0	AEL Kalloni	Heraklion
19:00	Bouchalakis 29'; Kubík 37'; Diamantakos 64'			Stadium: Pankritio Stadium; Attendance: 1,202; Referee: Michalis Voskakis

== Greek Cup ==
=== Second round ===
==== Matches ====
Win Draw Loss

25 September 2013 1st Leg	Panathinaikos	2 – 1	Ergotelis	Athens
20:30	Klonaridis 41'; Schildenfeld 90'		Diamantakos 59'	Stadium: Leoforos Alexandras Stadium; Referee: Giorgos Liahoudis

30 October 2013 2nd Leg	Ergotelis	0 – 1 (1 – 3 agg.)	Panathinaikos	Heraklion
18:00			49' Berg	Stadium: Pankritio Stadium; Referee: Giorgos Kominis

== Statistics ==
=== Goal scorers ===
No.	Pos.	Nation	Name	Super League Greece	Greek Cup	Total
16	FW	(Greece)	Dimitrios Diamantakos	9	1	10
39	MF	(Belgium) (Burundi)	Ziguy Badibanga	6	0	6
23	FW	(Greece)	Ilias Anastasakos	4	0	4
11	MF	(Greece)	Angelos Chanti	3	0	3
4	MF	(Portugal)	Pelé	3	0	3
47	FW	(Brazil)	Marcos Bambam	2	0	2
10	MF	(Greece)	Andreas Bouchalakis	2	0	2
73	FW	(Italy)	Gaetano Monachello	2	0	2
8	MF	(Argentina)	Diego Romano	2	0	2
9	FW	(Latvia)	Māris Verpakovskis	2	0	2
25	MF	(Norway)	Abdisalam Ibrahim	1	0	1
37	MF	(Slovakia)	František Kubík	1	0	1
89	DF	(Greece)	Georgios Sarris	1	0	1
-	-	-	Opponent's own Goals	1	0	1
TOTAL				39	1	40

Last updated: 25 April 2014
