= 2015–16 Ergotelis F.C. season =

Ergotelis
2015–16 season
- Chairman: Dimitris Papoutsakis
- Manager: Stavros Labrakis
- Stadium: Pankritio Stadium, Heraklion
- Football League: Withdrew
- Greek Cup: Round of 16
- Top goalscorer: League: Dimitrios Manos (5 goals); All: Dimitrios Manos (6 goals)
Home colours

The 2015–16 season was Ergotelis' 86th season in existence, 1st season in the Football League since the club's latest relegation from the Super League Greece, and ultimately the last season the club competed at a professional level, after its debut 14 years ago (2002). Ergotelis also participated in the Greek cup, entering the competition in the Second Round, and advancing up to the Round of 16. Unbearable financial issues forced club officials to withdraw the team from professional competitions on 19 January 2016.

== Players ==
Up until 19 January 2016

Summer acquisition
Winter acquisition

No.	Name	Nationality	Position (s)	Date of birth (age)	Signed from	Notes
Goalkeepers
28	Grigorios Athanasiou	(Greece)	GK	9 March 1984 (31)	(Cyprus) Ayia Napa	
38	Ioannis Dermitzakis	(Greece)	GK	5 November 1992 (22)	Youth system	
41	Alexandros Mylonakis	(Greece)	GK	12 August 1996 (19)	Youth system	
Defenders
6	Albi Alla	(Albania) (Greece)	CB	1 February 1993 (22)	(Greece) Panachaiki	Loan return
24	Minas Pitsos	(Greece)	LB	8 October 1980 (34)	(Greece) OFI	
77	Giorgos Kyriakopoulos	(Greece)	LB	5 February 1996 (19)	(Greece) Asteras Tripolis	On loan
2	Manolis Genitsaridis	(Greece)	RB	7 June 1996 (19)	(Greece) Fostiras	Loan return
15	Lefteris Gialousis	(Greece)	RB	18 July 1985 (30)	(Greece) Olympiacos Volos	
Midfielders
8	Michalis Avgenikou	(Greece)	DM	25 January 1993 (22)	(Greece) PAS Giannina	
21	Zani Kurti	(Albania)	DM	6 December 1993 (22)	(Greece) Irodotos	
16	Manolis Foukarakis	(Greece)	CM	8 August 1995 (20)	Youth system	
18	Antonis Bourselis	(Greece)	AM	6 July 1994 (21)	(Greece) P.A.O. Krousonas	
23	Leonardo Koutris	(Greece) (Brazil)	LB / LM	23 July 1995 (20)	Youth system	
11	Vasilios Rentzas	(Greece)	RB / RM	16 April 1992 (23)	(Greece) AEL	
Forwards
7	Giannis Domatas	(Greece)	RW	31 January 1992 (23)	(Greece) Ermionida	
19	Konstantinos Garefalakis	(Greece)	CF	16 February 1996 (19)	(Greece) Olympiacos U-20	
22	Ahmed Camara	(Guinea)	CF	2 February 1991 (24)	(Greece) Asteras Vari	
33	Dimitrios Manos	(Greece)	CF	16 September 1994 (21)	(Greece) Veria	On loan

=== The following players have departed in mid-season ===
5	Christos Gromitsaris	(Greece)	CB	10 February 1991 (24)	(Greece) Fostiras	Contract terminated
26	Miroslav Stevanović	(Bosnia and Herzegovina) (Serbia)	RW	29 July 1990 (25)	(Hungary) Győr	Contract terminated
14	Georgios Pamlidis	(Greece)	CF	13 November 1993 (22)	(Greece) AEL	Contract terminated.
66	Khassa Camara	(Mauritania) (France)	DM	22 October 1992 (23)	(France) Troyes	Contract terminated.

=== Out of team ===
10	Thomas Dos Santos	(France) (Portugal)	AM	13 March 1992 (23)	(France) Bayonne	AWOL since 4/1/2016.
20	Elton Calé	(Brazil)	AM / CF	12 July 1988 (27)	(Portugal) União Madeira	AWOL since 4/1/2016.
9	Nenad Injac	(Serbia)	CF / RW	4 September 1985 (30)	Free agent	AWOL since 4/1/2016.

Note: Flags indicate national team as has been defined under FIFA eligibility rules. Players and Managers may hold more than one non-FIFA nationality.

Head coach	Captain	Kit manufacturer	Shirt sponsor
(Greece) Stavros Labrakis	(Greece) Minas Pitsos	Macron	Pame Stoixima

== Transfers ==
Winter Transfer Window

== In ==
Squad #	Position	Player	Transferred From	Fee	Date
N/A	DF	(Greece) Epaminondas Pantelakis	(Greece) Fostiras	Loan return	5 June 2015
6	DF	(Albania) (Greece) Albi Alla	(Greece) Panachaiki	Loan return	1 July 2015
N/A	FW	(Greece) Sokratis Evangelou	(Greece) Irodotos	Loan return	1 July 2015
14	FW	(Greece) Georgios Pamlidis	(Greece) AEL	Loan return	1 July 2015
2	DF	(Greece) Manolis Genitsaridis	(Greece) Fostiras	Loan return	1 July 2015
19	FW	(Greece) Konstantinos Garefalakis	(Greece) Olympiacos U-20	Free	5 August 2015
10	MF	(France) (Portugal) Thomas Dos Santos	(France) Bayonne	Free	6 August 2015
15	DF	(Greece) Lefteris Gialousis	(Greece) Olympiacos Volos	Free	6 August 2015
28	GK	(Greece) Grigorios Athanasiou	(Cyprus) Ayia Napa	Free	7 August 2015
77	DF	(Greece) Giorgos Kyriakopoulos	(Greece) Asteras Tripolis	Loan	13 August 2015
7	FW	(Greece) Giannis Domatas	(Greece) Ermionida	Free	13 August 2015
5	DF	(Greece) Christos Gromitsaris	(Greece) Fostiras	Free	21 August 2015
8	MF	(Greece) Michalis Avgenikou	(Greece) PAS Giannina	Free	29 August 2015
21	MF	(Albania) Zani Kurti	(Greece) Irodotos	Free	31 August 2015
33	FW	(Greece) Dimitrios Manos	(Greece) Veria	Loan	31 August 2015
66	MF	(Mauritania) (France) Khassa Camara	(France) Troyes	Free	9 September 2015
22	FW	(Guinea) Ahmed Camara	(Greece) Asteras Vari	Free	10 September 2015
26	FW	(Bosnia and Herzegovina) (Serbia) Miroslav Stevanović	(Hungary) Győr	Free	10 September 2015
9	FW	(Serbia) Nenad Injac	Free agent	Free	11 September 2015

=== Promoted from youth system ===
Squad #	Position	Player	Date	Signed Until
41	GK	(Greece) Alexandros Mylonakis	24 September 2015	30 June 2020
16	MF	(Greece) Manolis Foukarakis	24 September 2015	30 June 2020

Total spending: ▼0.00 €

== Out ==
Position	Player	Transferred To	Fee	Date
MF	(France) Greg Houla	(France) Orléans	Free	12 May 2015
MF	(Greece) (Brazil) Bruno Chalkiadakis	(Greece) Olympiacos	▲€300,000	21 May 2015
DF	(Greece) Epaminondas Pantelakis	(Greece) Olympiacos	▲€200,000	5 June 2015
MF	(France) (Senegal) Yann Boé-Kane	(France) Red Star	Free	18 June 2015
MF	(Greece) Savvas Gentsoglou	(Italy) Bari	Free	23 June 2015
MF	(Greece) Angelos Chanti	(Greece) Iraklis	Free	26 June 2015
DF	(Greece) Charalambos Lykogiannis	(Greece) Olympiacos	Loan return	30 June 2015
DF	(Greece) Manolis Tzanakakis	(Greece) Olympiacos	Loan return	30 June 2015
FW	(Nigeria) Michael Olaitan	(Greece) Olympiacos	Loan return	30 June 2015
GK	(Serbia) Bojan Šaranov	Free agent	Free	30 June 2015
DF	(France) Cyriaque Louvion	(France) Tours	Free	30 June 2015
GK	(Greece) Zacharias Kavousakis	(Greece) AEL	Free	2 July 2015
DF	(Latvia) Kaspars Gorkšs	(Czech Republic) Dukla Prague	Free	2 July 2015
MF	(Greece) Chrysovalantis Kozoronis	(Greece) PAS Giannina	Free	14 July 2015
FW	(Serbia) Nikola Stojanović	Free agent	Free	14 July 2015
MF	(Comoros) (France) Mohamed Youssouf	(Greece) Veria	▲€50,000	29 July 2015
DF	(Serbia) Borislav Jovanović	(Greece) AEL	Free	29 July 2015
FW	(Serbia) Vladimir Đilas	(Greece) Panachaiki	Free	31 July 2015
GK	(Greece) Anastasios Daskalakis	(Greece) Olympiacos Volos	Free	1 August 2015
FW	(Greece) Sokratis Evangelou	(Greece) A.E. Karaiskakis	Free	1 August 2015
MF	(Greece) Konstantinos Kaznaferis	(Greece) Aris	Free	13 September 2015
DF	(Greece) Christos Gromitsaris	(Greece) Kerkyra	Free	30 December 2015
FW	(Bosnia and Herzegovina) (Serbia) Miroslav Stevanović	(Bosnia and Herzegovina) Željezničar	Free	30 December 2015
FW	(Greece) Georgios Pamlidis	(Greece) Kerkyra	Free	5 January 2016
MF	(Mauritania) (France) Khassa Camara	(Greece) Skoda Xanthi	Free	5 January 2016
DF	(Greece) Giorgos Kyriakopoulos	(Greece) Asteras Tripolis	Loan return	19 January 2016
FW	(Greece) Dimitrios Manos	(Greece) Veria	Loan return	19 January 2016
Team withdrew from professional competitions – All players released as free agents				19 January 2016

Total income: ▲€550,000

Expenditure: ▲€550,000

== Managerial changes ==
Outgoing manager	Manner of departure	Date of vacancy	Position in table	Incoming manager	Date of appointment
(Greece) Giannis Taousianis	Mutual consent	27 July 2015	--	(Bosnia and Herzegovina) Jasminko Velić	5 August 2015
(Bosnia and Herzegovina) Jasminko Velić	Sacked	21 October 2015	12th	(Greece) Stavros Labrakis	21 October 2015

== Kit ==
2015−16

Supplier: Macron
Sponsor(s): Pame Stoixima

Home/Away

Source: ergotelis.gr

== Pre-season and friendlies ==
=== Pre-season friendlies ===
Win Draw Loss

14 August 2015 Friendly	Ergotelis (Greece)	1 – 1	(Greece) AO Tymbaki	Heraklion, Crete, Greece
18:30	Pamlidis 5'	Report	Kartalianakis 75'	Stadium: Pankritio Stadium, Training Ground

17 August 2015 Friendly	Ergotelis (Greece)	2 – 0	(Greece) Doxa Galias	Heraklion, Crete, Greece
18:30	Pamlidis 58'; Bourselis 70'	Report		Stadium: Pankritio Stadium, Training Ground

20 August 2015 Friendly	Ergotelis (Greece)	2 – 1	(Greece) Kissamikos	Heraklion, Crete, Greece
18:45	Domatas 24'; Pamlidis 66'	Report	Tsoukanis 71' (pen.)	Stadium: Pankritio Stadium

23 August 2015 Friendly	Ergotelis (Greece)	1 – 2	(Greece) Chania	Heraklion, Crete, Greece
18:30	Bourselis 37'	Report	Lita 20' (pen.); Kourdakis 49'	Stadium: Pankritio Stadium

26 August 2015 Friendly	Irodotos (Greece)	2 – 0	(Greece) Ergotelis	Heraklion, Crete, Greece
18:15	Siskakis 28'; Zafiris 40'	Report		Stadium: Municipal Nea Alikarnassos Stadium

6 September 2015 Friendly	Ergotelis (Greece)	3 – 0	(Greece) Rouvas	Heraklion, Crete, Greece
18:15	Gialousis 32'; Kurti 47'; Pamlidis 72'	Report		Stadium: Pankritio Stadium, Training Ground

13 September 2015 Friendly	OFI (Greece)	0 – 0	(Greece) Ergotelis	Heraklion, Crete, Greece
17:30		Report		Stadium: Theodoros Vardinogiannis Stadium

19 September 2015 Friendly	Ergotelis (Greece)	2 – 1	(Greece) Ermis Zoniana	Heraklion, Crete, Greece
18:30	Domatas 54', 64'	Report	Bastanis 14'	Stadium: Pankritio Stadium

== Competitions ==
=== Overview ===
Competition	Started round	Current position / round	Final position / round	First match	Last match
Football League Greece	1	8th / 15	18th / 34	28 September 2015	18 January 2016
Greek Football Cup	Second Round	Round of 16	Round of 16	27 October 2015	14 January 2016

Last updated: 18 August 2015

== League table ==
Pos	Team	Pld	W	D	L	GF	GA	GD	Pts	Promotion or relegation
14	Panelefsiniakos	34	10	5	19	34	53	−19	35	
15	Zakynthos (Note: Zakynthos, Kallithea and Panachaiki were deducted 3 points.) (R)	34	10	7	17	31	32	−1	34	Relegation to Gamma Ethniki
16	Panachaiki (R)	34	8	7	19	26	47	−21	28	Relegation to Gamma Ethniki
17	Olympiacos Volos (Note: Olympiacos Volos withdrew from the league and they were deducted 9 points.) (R)	33	5	4	24	16	69	−53	10	Relegation to Gamma Ethniki
18	Ergotelis (Note: Ergotelis withdrew from the league and they were deducted 12 points.) (R)	33	5	4	24	18	73	−55	7	Relegation to Gamma Ethniki

Source: Football League
Rules for classification: 1) Points; 2) Head-to-head points; 3) Head-to-head goal difference; 4) Goals scored; 5) Goals against; 6) Play-offs (neutral ground, only used if needed to decide teams for promotion or relegation).
(R) Relegated

== Results summary ==
Overall								Home						Away					
Pld	W	D	L	GF	GA	GD	Pts	W	D	L	GF	GA	GD	W	D	L	GF	GA	GD
15	5	4	6	18	19	−1	19	3	3	2	12	9	+3	2	1	4	6	10	−4

Last updated: 4 September 2015.
Source: Competitive matches

=== Matches ===
Win Draw Loss Postponed

28 September 2015 1	Ergotelis	0 – 1	Chania	Heraklion, Crete, Greece
18:00		Report	Chatziliadis 47'	Stadium: Pankritio Stadium; Referee: Evangelos Kordolemis

4 October 2015 2	Acharnaikos	1 – 2	Ergotelis	Acharnes, Athens, Greece
16:00	Obradović 3'	Report	Manos 88'; Injac 90+1'	Stadium: Acharnes Stadium; Referee: Triantafyllos Tikas

11 October 2015 3	Ergotelis	1 – 1	Lamia	Heraklion, Crete, Greece
16:00	Pamlidis 87'	Report	Neofytos 11'	Stadium: Pankritio Stadium; Referee: Angelos Zaravinos

17 October 2015 4	AEL	2 – 1	Ergotelis	Larissa, Greece
18:00	Nayar 87'; Maroukakis 90+4'	Report	Bourselis 35'	Stadium: AEL FC Arena; Referee: Angelos Angelakis

24 October 2015 5	Ergotelis	3 – 2	Panegialios	Heraklion, Crete, Greece
15:00	Pamlidis 37'; Manos 45'; Avgenikou 67'	Report	Skartsilas 12'; Bourlakis 52'	Stadium: Pankritio Stadium; Referee: Symeon Koskidis

1 November 2015 6	Ergotelis	3 – 1	Panelefsiniakos	Heraklion, Crete, Greece
15:00	Bourselis 25'; Manos 72'; Calé 80'	Report	Blanco 24'	Stadium: Pankritio Stadium; Referee: Stylianos Fotis

8 November 2015 7	Apollon Smyrnis	3 – 0	Ergotelis	Rizoupoli, Athens, Greece
15:00	Farinola 44'; Tzioras 65', 90+2'	Report		Stadium: Georgios Kamaras Stadium; Referee: Vasilios Fotias

15 November 2015 8	Ergotelis	0 – 0	Olympiacos Volos	Heraklion, Crete, Greece
15:00		Report		Stadium: Pankritio Stadium; Referee: Alexandros Tsamouris

23 November 2015 9	Kissamikos	2 – 1	Ergotelis	Rethymno, Crete, Greece
18:00	Vattis 61'; Mantzis 75'	Report	Pamlidis 45'	Stadium: Gallos Stadium; Referee: Iosif Sfakianakis

29 November 2015 10	Ergotelis	1 – 2	Agrotikos Asteras	Heraklion, Crete, Greece
15:00	Injac 81'	Report	Oikonomou 1'; Jesic 12'	Stadium: Pankritio Stadium; Referee: Emmanuel Miaris

7 December 2015 11	Kallithea	1 – 0	Ergotelis	Kallithea, Athens, Greece
15:00	Frangos 58'	Report		Stadium: Grigoris Lambrakis Stadium; Referee: Panagiotis Masouras

12 December 2015 12	Ergotelis	3 – 1	Panachaiki	Heraklion, Crete, Greece
15:00	Manos 46'; Gromitsaris 62'; Rentzas 85'	Report	Kargas 25'	Stadium: Pankritio Stadium; Referee: Angelos Zaravinos

21 December 2015 13	Kerkyra	1 – 2	Ergotelis	Kerkyra, Greece
18:00	Souanis 45+1' (pen.)	Report	Kurti 16'; Manos 77'	Stadium: Kerkyra Stadium; Referee: Fotis Fotiadis

10 January 2016 14	Anagennisi Karditsa	0 – 0	Ergotelis	Karditsa, Greece
14:00		Report		Stadium: Karditsa Stadium; Referee: Andreas Karaliolios

18 January 2016 15	Ergotelis	1 – 1	Trikala	Heraklion, Crete, Greece
17:00	Kurti 71'	Report	Navarro 45'	Stadium: Pankritio Stadium; Referee: Panagiotis Kakridis

– 16^{1}	Panserraikos	3 – 0 (w/o)	Ergotelis	–
–				Stadium: – Referee: –

– 17^{1}	Ergotelis	0 – 3 (w/o)	Zakynthos	–
–				Stadium: – Referee: –

– 18^{1}	Chania	3 – 0 (w/o)	Ergotelis	–
–				Stadium: – Referee: –

– 19^{1}	Ergotelis	0 – 3 (w/o)	Acharnaikos	–
–				Stadium: – Referee: –

– 20^{1}	Lamia	3 – 0 (w/o)	Ergotelis	–
–				Stadium: – Referee: –

– 21^{1}	Ergotelis	0 – 3 (w/o)	AEL	–
–				Stadium: – Referee: –

– 22^{1}	Panegialios	3 – 0 (w/o)	Ergotelis	–
–				Stadium: – Referee: –

– 23^{1}	Panelefsiniakos	3 – 0 (w/o)	Ergotelis	–
–				Stadium: – Referee: –

– 24^{1}	Ergotelis	0 – 3 (w/o)	Apollon Smyrnis	–
–				Stadium: – Referee: –

– 25^{1}	Olympiacos Volos	3 – 0 (w/o)	Ergotelis	–
–				Stadium: – Referee: –

– 26^{1}	Ergotelis	0 – 3 (w/o)	Kissamikos	–
–				Stadium: – Referee: –

– 27^{1}	Agrotikos Asteras	3 – 0 (w/o)	Ergotelis	–
–				Stadium: – Referee: –

– 28^{1}	Ergotelis	0 – 3 (w/o)	Kallithea	–
–				Stadium: – Referee: –

– 29^{1}	Panachaiki	3 – 0 (w/o)	Ergotelis	–
–				Stadium: – Referee: –

– 30^{1}	Ergotelis	0 – 3 (w/o)	Kerkyra	–
–				Stadium: – Referee: –

– 31^{1}	Ergotelis	0 – 3 (w/o)	Anagennisi Karditsa	–
–				Stadium: – Referee: –

– 32^{1}	Trikala	3 – 0 (w/o)	Ergotelis	–
–				Stadium: – Referee: –

– 33^{1}	Ergotelis	0 – 3 (w/o)	Panserraikos	–
–				Stadium: – Referee: –

– 34^{1}	Zakynthos	3 – 0 (w/o)	Ergotelis	–
–				Stadium: – Referee: –

1. As of 19 January 2016, all remaining Ergotelis matches were awarded to opponents (3–0), due to Ergotelis formally withdrawing from the league.

== Greek Cup ==
=== Second round ===
==== Group B ====
Pos	Team	Pld	W	D	L	GF	GA	GD	Pts	Qualification	PGSS	ERG	ZAK	PNE
1	Panionios	3	3	0	0	5	2	+3	9	Round of 16		—	1–0	—
2	Ergotelis	3	1	1	1	6	6	0	4	Round of 16	1–2		—	3–2
3	Zakynthos	3	1	1	1	3	3	0	4		—	2–2		1–0
4	Panetolikos	3	0	0	3	3	6	−3	0		1–2	—	—	

Source: epo.gr

==== Matches ====
Win Draw Loss

27 October 2015 1	Zakynthos	2 – 2	Ergotelis	Zakynthos, Greece
15:00	Vythoulkas 28', 49'	Report	Bourselis 71'; Injac 83'	Stadium: Zakynthians Olympic Champions Ground; Referee: Giorgos Michailidis

3 December 2015 2	Ergotelis	3 – 2	Panetolikos	Heraklion, Crete, Greece
15:00	Kh. Camara 31'; Manos 44'; Injac 50'	Report	Vasileiou 49'; Villafáñez 72'	Stadium: Theodoros Vardinogiannis Stadium ^{1} Referee: Ilias Spathas

16 December 2015 3	Ergotelis	1 – 2	Panionios	Heraklion, Crete, Greece
15:00	Dos Santos 54' (pen.)	Report	Katharios 38'; Villalba 75'	Stadium: Pankritio Stadium; Referee: Ioannis Neofytiadis

1. Matchday 2 vs. Panetolikos, originally meant to be held at the Pankritio Stadium was instead played at the local Theodoros Vardinogiannis Stadium, due to restoration works.

=== Round of 16 ===
Team 1	Agg.	Team 2	1st leg	2nd leg
Ergotelis	0 – 2	Panionios	0 – 1	0 – 1

==== Matches ====
Win Draw Loss

6 January 2016 1st Leg	Ergotelis	0 – 1	Panionios	Heraklion, Crete, Greece
17:15		Report	Karamanos 17'	Stadium: Pankritio Stadium; Referee: Spyros Selimos

14 January 2016 2nd Leg	Panionios	1 – 0 (2 – 0 agg.)	Ergotelis	Nea Smyrni, Athens, Greece
15:00	Bakasetas 21'	Report		Stadium: Nea Smyrni Stadium; Referee: Athanasios Sezos

== Statistics ==
Up until 19 January 2016

Player has departed in mid-season

=== Goal scorers ===
No.	Pos.	Nation	Name	Greek Football League	Greek Cup	Total
33	FW	(Greece)	Dimitrios Manos	5	1	6
9	FW	(Serbia)	Nenad Injac	2	2	4
14	FW	(Greece)	Georgios Pamlidis	3	0	3
18	MF	(Greece)	Antonis Bourselis	2	1	3
21	MF	(Albania)	Zani Kurti	2	0	2
8	MF	(Greece)	Michalis Avgenikou	1	0	1
20	MF	(Brazil)	Elton Calé	1	0	1
5	DF	(Greece)	Christos Gromitsaris	1	0	1
11	MF	(Greece)	Vasilios Rentzas	1	0	1
66	MF	(Mauritania) (France)	Khassa Camara	0	1	1
10	MF	(France) (Portugal)	Thomas Dos Santos	0	1	1
-	-	-	Opponent's own Goals	0	0	0
TOTAL				18	6	24

Last updated: 19 January 2016
