= 2013–14 Skoda Xanthi F.C. season =

Skoda Xanthi
2013-14 season
- Super League Greece: 16th
- 2013–14 UEFA Europa League qualifying phase: Third Qualifying Round
- 2013–14 Greek Football Cup: Round of 32
Home colours	Away colours

Skoda Xanthi are a Greek football club which are based in Xanthi. During the 2013/14 campaign they will be competing in the following competitions Greek Super League, Greek Cup, Uefa Europa League.

== Greek Super League ==
=== League table ===
Pos	Team	Pld	W	D	L	GF	GA	GD	Pts	Qualification or relegation
14	Platanias	34	10	8	16	39	48	−9	38 (Note: Head-to-head points: Platanias 8, Veria 5, Skoda Xanthi 3.)	
15	Veria	34	9	11	14	31	51	−20	38	
16	Skoda Xanthi	34	11	5	18	44	54	−10	38	Qualification for the Relegation play-off
17	Apollon Smyrnis (R)	34	9	9	16	43	54	−11	36	Relegation to Football League
18	Aris (R)	34	3	13	18	26	53	−27	22	Relegation to Gamma Ethniki (Note: Aris withdrew from the Football League due to financial reasons, hence they were relegated to Gamma Ethniki for the 14/15 season.)

Source: Super League Greece
Rules for classification: 1) Points; 2) Head-to-head points; 3) Head-to-head goal difference; 4) Goals scored; 5) Goals against; 6) Play-offs (neutral ground).
(Note: Criteria 6 is only used if needed to decide champion, teams for relegation or teams for UEFA competitions).
If in final league table there are still tied teams after applying criteria 1 to 5, a decision match (or matches if they are more than two) are to be played but only in three cases: to determine the champion, to fill spots in the play-off or to determine the teams to be relegated. In any other case, the final standings of tied teams are determined with a public draw.
(R) Relegated

=== Matches ===
17 August 2013 Match 1	PAOK	3 - 0	Skoda Xanthi	Thessaloniki
21:30	Íñigo López (yellow card) 15'; Miguel Vítor 43'; Lino (yellow card) 45'; Lucas 67' (pen.); Stoch (yellow card) 69'; Athanasiadis 73'	Summary	Mantalos (yellow card) 18'; Kyriakidis (yellow card) 37'; Baxevanidis (red card) 66'; Gohouri (yellow card) 71'	Stadium: Toumba Stadium; Attendance: 17,139; Referee: (Greece) Marios Labropoulos

25 August 2013 Match 2	Skoda Xanthi	1 - 0	Panthrakikos	Xanthi
19:15	Solari (yellow card) 40' (goal) 45+4'; Paíto (yellow card) 49'; Marcelinho (yellow card) 60'; Goutas (yellow card) 64'	Summary	M'Bow (yellow card) 29'; Baykara (yellow card) 31'; Denis Popovic (yellow card) 66'	Stadium: Skoda Xanthi Arena; Attendance: 1,754; Referee: (Greece) Michael Koukoulakis

31 August 2013 Match 3	Skoda Xanthi	0 - 0	Ergotelis	Xanthi
19:15	Dié (yellow card) 31'; Paíto (yellow card) 49'; Marcelinho (yellow card) 55'; Mantalos (yellow card) 74'	Summary	Sarris (yellow card) 9'; Tzanakakis (yellow card) 38'; Pitsos (yellow card) 40' (yellow-red card); Marcos Antonio Simão Pereira (yellow card) 65'; Chrysovalantis Kozoronis (yellow card) 80'; Cardozo (yellow card) 90+3'	Stadium: Toumba Stadium; Attendance: 1,276; Referee: (Greece) Anastasios Kakos
