= Gallou =

Gallou is a surname. Notable people with the surname include:

- Gilles Gallou, French football player
- Bertrand Gallou (born 1974), French former professional football player
- Yves-Marie Le Gallou, French politician
- Jean-Yves Le Gallou (born 1948), French politician, member of the European Parliament
