= Giannis Domatas =

Greek footballer

Personal information
- Full name: Ioannis Domatas
- Date of birth: 31 January 1992 (age 34)
- Place of birth: Heraklion, Greece
- Height: 1.76 m (5 ft 9 1/2 in)
- Position: Left winger

Team information
- Current team: Rodos

Youth career
- –2012: Ergotelis

Senior career*
Years	Team	Apps	(Gls)
2012–2015	Ergotelis	29	(3)
2014	→ Asteras Magoula (loan)	7	(1)
2014–2015	→ Giouchtas (loan)	9	(0)
2015	Ermionida	16	(2)
2015–2016	Ergotelis	14	(0)
2016	Panserraikos	12	(1)
2016–2017	Olympiacos Volos	24	(2)
2017–2018	Aiginiakos	8	(1)
2018	Ethnikos Piraeus	0	(0)
2018–2019	Niki Volos	0	(0)
2019	Ialysos	0	(0)
2019–2020	Asteras Vlachioti		
2020	Thyella Kamari		
2020–2021	Mykonos		
2021	Atsalenios		
2021–2023	Giouchtas		
2023	Episkopi		
2024	Ialysos		
2024–2025	AER Afantou		
2025	Rodos		
2025–2026	Ialysos		
2026–	Rodos		
- * Club domestic league appearances and goals as of 16 January 2018

Giannis Domatas (Greek: Γιάννης Δωματάς, born 31 January 1992) is a Greek professional footballer who plays as a left winger for Rodos.

== Career ==
Domatas began his football career in the youth teams of his local side Ergotelis and signed his first professional contract with the club, on 24 May 2012. He scored his first goal on 24 October 2012, during a Cup match against Aiginiakos. He would proceed to add another two goals during Ergotelis' 2012–13 Football League season, thus helping his club gain promotion to the Super League.

In the winter transfer period of the 2013–14 season, Domatas was loaned out to Football League side Asteras Magoula. He went on to make 7 appearances and score 1 goal before returning to Ergotelis. In the next season, Domatas was loaned out again, this time to local Gamma Ethniki side Giouchtas. His feats with the club did not go unnoticed and after six months, on 13 January 2015 he signed with Football League side Ermionida, after mutually terminating his contract with Ergotelis. In 16 appearances with the club, Domatas scored 2 goals, yet Ermionida was relegated after finishing 4th in the 2014–15 Football League relegation playoffs.

On 13 August 2015, Domatas returned to Ergotelis, signing a one-year contract with his former club. Domatas was one of just 17 players to remain part of the club's roster despite unbearable financial issues during the season, which ultimately forced the club to withdraw from professional competitions in January 2016.

As a free agent after Ergotelis' meltdown, Domatas signed with fellow Football League side Panserraikos, where he stayed until the end of the season. He eventually went on to play for Olympiacos Volos in the Gamma Ethniki, for the 2016−17 season, making a total of 24 appearances and scoring two goals, before signing with Aiginiakos and returning to the Football League.
