= Antonis Bourselis =

Greek footballer (born 1994)

Personal information
- Full name: Antonios Bourselis
- Date of birth: 6 July 1994 (age 32)
- Place of birth: Heraklion, Crete, Greece
- Height: 1.77 m (5 ft 9 1/2 in)
- Position: Attacking midfielder

Team information
- Current team: Chania
- Number: 10

Youth career
- –2013: Ergotelis

Senior career*
Years	Team	Apps	(Gls)
2013–2016	Ergotelis	20	(2)
2014	→ PAO Krousonas (loan)	15	(0)
2016–2017	OFI	14	(0)
2017–2022	Ergotelis	99	(10)
2022	Almyros Gazi		
2023–	Chania	19	(3)
- * Club domestic league appearances and goals as of 16 June 2023

Antonis Bourselis (Greek: Αντώνης Μπουρσέλης; born 6 July 1994) is a Greek professional footballer who plays as an attacking midfielder for Super League 2 club Chania.

== Career ==
Bourselis began his football career in the youth teams of his local side Ergotelis and signed his first professional contract with the club, on 28 January 2013. He made his debut for the club on 17 August 2013 in the 2013–14 Super League opening match against Atromitos. On 15 January 2014, Bourselis was loaned out to Gamma Ethniki side P.A.O. Krousonas for the remainder of the season, in order to get more playing time. He made a total of 15 appearances for P.A.O. Krousonas, all as a starter.

On 17 October 2015, Bourselis scored his first goal for Ergotelis, in a Football League match against Larissa. In January 2016, and after Ergotelis withdrew from professional competitions as a result of unbearable financial obligations, Bourselis, who had been one of the 17 players still remaining in the club's roster, signed with local Football League 2 side OFI. He spent an injury-ridden 1,5 years with OFI in both the Gamma Ethniki (8 caps) and the Football League (6 caps, plus another two in the Greek Football Cup), before returning to Ergotelis in the summer of 2017.

== Career statistics ==
As of matches played 19 May 2021

Club	Season	League			Cup		Other		Total	
Club	Season	Division	Apps	Goals	Apps	Goals	Apps	Goals	Apps	Goals
Ergotelis	2012–13	Football League	0	0	0	0	—		0	0
Ergotelis	2013–14	Super League	2	0	0	0	—		2	0
Ergotelis	Total		2	0	0	0	—		2	0
Krousonas	2013–14	Gamma Ethniki	15	0	0	0	—		15	0
Krousonas	Total		15	0	0	0	—		15	0
Ergotelis	2014–15	Super League	4	0	2	0	—		6	0
Ergotelis	2015–16	Football League	14	2	3	1	—		17	3
Ergotelis	Total		18	2	5	1	—		23	3
OFI	2015–16	Gamma Ethniki	8	0	0	0	—		8	0
OFI	2016–17	Football League	6	0	2	0	—		8	0
OFI	Total		14	0	2	0	—		16	0
Ergotelis	2017–18	Football League	26	2	2	0	—		28	2
Ergotelis	2018–19	Football League	26	2	7	1	—		33	3
Ergotelis	2019–20	Super League 2	14	1	1	1	—		15	2
Ergotelis	2020–21	Super League 2	24	3	—		—		24	3
Ergotelis	2021–22	Super League 2	0	0	0	0	—		0	0
Ergotelis	Total		90	8	10	2	—		100	10
Career total			139	10	17	3	—		156	13

== Honours ==
OFI

- Gamma Ethniki: 2015–16
