= Stefanos Vavoulas =

Greek footballer

Personal information
- Date of birth: 4 January 1965 (age 61)

Senior career*
Years	Team	Apps	(Gls)
–1985	Atsaleniou		
1985–1997	OFI		
1997–1998	EAR		
- * Club domestic league appearances and goals

Stefanos Vavoulas (Greek: Στέφανος Βάβουλας; born 4 January 1965) is a Greek retired football defender.
