= Andreas Bouchalakis =

Greek footballer (born 1993)

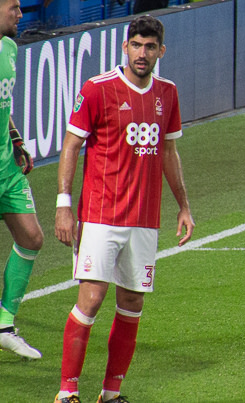
- Bouchalakis with Nottingham Forest in 2017

Personal information
- Full name: Andreas Bouchalakis
- Date of birth: 5 April 1993 (age 33)
- Place of birth: Heraklion, Crete, Greece
- Height: 1.86 m (6 ft 1 in)
- Position: Central midfielder

Team information
- Current team: OFI
- Number: 41

Youth career
- 2008–2011: Ergotelis

Senior career*
Years	Team	Apps	(Gls)
2011–2014	Ergotelis	73	(8)
2014–2017	Olympiacos	22	(2)
2017–2018	Nottingham Forest	25	(2)
2018–2023	Olympiacos	119	(8)
2023	→ Konyaspor (loan)	12	(0)
2023–2025	Hertha BSC	34	(1)
2025–2026	Panetolikos	30	(1)
2026–	OFI	5	(1)

International career^{‡}
2010	Greece U18	3	(0)
2012–2013	Greece U19	8	(0)
2013–2014	Greece U20	7	(1)
2013–2016	Greece U21	9	(1)
2017–2024	Greece	47	(1)
Medal record
Men's football
Representing Greece
UEFA European Under-19 Championship
Runner-up	2012 Estonia
- * Club domestic league appearances and goals as of 20 September 2026 ‡ National team caps and goals as of 10 September 2024

Andreas Bouchalakis (Greek: Ανδρέας Μπουχαλάκης, born 5 April 1993) is a Greek professional footballer who plays as a central midfielder for Super League club OFI.

== Club career ==
=== Ergotelis ===
Bouchalakis started his football career attending the Ergotelis Academy, the youth system of his local Super League club Ergotelis. His performances with the club's youth teams in the Greek Superleague Youth Leagues led the club's board of directors to promote him to the first team on 19 May 2011, when he signed his first professional contract with the club at the age of 18. He eventually made his debut on 11 December 2011, in a game against Doxa Drama.

During the summer of 2012, Bouchalakis earned the trust of manager Siniša Gogić and became a regular starter for the club during their short tenure in the Greek Football League. His good performances reportedly drew the attention of many clubs, both in Greece and abroad. Eventually, Greek giants Olympiacos acquired his rights from Ergotelis on 22 March 2013 for a reported €150,000, following up on the acquisition of Bouchalakis' Ergotelis teammate Manolis Tzanakakis. As part of the deal, both players were allowed to finish the season with Ergotelis, who also acquired the right re-sign both players on loan in the following season. Bouchalakis was instrumental in helping the club return to the Super League at the end of the 2012–13 season, summing up 40 caps in both the Football League and Greek Cup competitions and managing to score 6 goals while supplying two assists.

After Bouchalakis' and Tzanakakis' transfers were announced by Olympiacos, the club's board of directors decided to green-light the loan deal with Ergotelis, who added both players to their roster for the 2013–14 Super League season in order for them to receive substantial playing time in top-flight in a familiar environment. Bouchalakis contributed to Ergotelis' all-time best (at the time) 7th-place finish with 30 caps and 2 goals. He returned to Olympiacos in the summer of 2014 to earn a spot in the champions' roster for next season.

=== Olympiacos ===
Bouchalakis scored from long distance in a 3–0 win against AC Milan in the 2014 International Champions Cup.

On the beginning of the 2015–16 season, Bouchalakis tried his best to convince his coach Marco Silva to stay in the club. His contract was extended in 2016 until the summer of 2020.

=== Nottingham Forest ===
After a trial in pre-season, Bouchalakis signed a 3-year contract with EFL Championship club Nottingham Forest in July 2017. As Forest and Olympiacos had the same owner, there was no transfer fee. He scored twice on his league debut as Forest won 4–3 away to Brentford on 12 August. He played regularly in the first half of the season but lost his place under new manager Aitor Karanka.

=== Return to Olympiacos ===
Bouchalakis rejoined Olympiacos in July 2018. On 23 August 2018, he scored with a header from Kostas Fortounis' free kick to help Olympiacos beat Burnley 3–1 at home in the first leg of the 2018–19 Europa League play-off round; it was his first goal in UEFA competitions. On 31 March 2019, he scored his first goal of the 2018–19 Super League season to beat Atromitos 2–1. On 1 March 2020, Bouchalakis latched on to the second Mathieu Valbuena's assist in the game, to score a second for Olympiacos in a 2–0 home game against Panetolikos, head into the 2019–20 play-offs with an undefeated 26 matches' record. It was his first goal for the season.

=== Hertha BSC ===
On 31 August 2023, Bouchalakis signed a two-year contract with Hertha BSC in Germany. On 16 May 2025, Hertha announced that Bouchalakis would leave the club upon the expiry of his contract on June 30.

== Career statistics ==
=== Club ===
As of match played 6 September 2026

Appearances and goals by club, season and competition
Club	Season	League			National Cup		League Cup		Europe		Total	
Club	Season	Division	Apps	Goals	Apps	Goals	Apps	Goals	Apps	Goals	Apps	Goals
Ergotelis	2011–12	Super League Greece	2	0	0	0	—		—		2	0
Ergotelis	2012–13	Super League Greece 2	39	6	1	0	—		—		40	6
Ergotelis	2013–14	Super League Greece	30	2	1	0	—		—		31	2
Ergotelis	Total		71	8	2	0	—		—		73	8
Olympiacos	2014–15	Super League Greece	9	1	6	1	—		1 (Note: Appearance in UEFA Champions League)	0	16	2
Olympiacos	2015–16	Super League Greece	5	1	1	0	—		0	0	6	1
Olympiacos	2016–17	Super League Greece	8	0	5	0	—		4 (Note: Two appearances in UEFA Champions League, two appearances in UEFA Europa League)	0	17	0
Olympiacos	Total		22	2	12	1	—		5	0	39	3
Nottingham Forest	2017–18	Championship	21	2	1	0	3	0	—		25	2
Olympiacos	2018–19	Super League Greece	18	1	3	0	—		9 (Note: Appearances in UEFA Europa League)	1	30	2
Olympiacos	2019–20	Super League Greece	33	1	3	0	—		16	0	52	1
Olympiacos	2020–21	Super League Greece	30	3	7	1	—		12	1	49	5
Olympiacos	2021–22	Super League Greece	28	2	4	0	—		10	0	42	2
Olympiacos	2022–23	Super League Greece	3	1	2	0	—		9	0	14	1
Olympiacos	Total		112	8	19	1	—		56	2	187	11
Konyaspor (Ioan)	2022–23	Süper Lig	12	0	0	0	—		—		12	0
Hertha BSC	2023–24	2. Bundesliga	25	1	2	0	—		—		27	1
Hertha BSC	2024–25	2. Bundesliga	9	0	1	0	—		—		10	0
Hertha BSC	Total		34	1	3	0	—		0	0	37	1
Panetolikos	2025–26	Super League Greece	30	1	4	0	—		—		34	1
OFI	2026–27	Super League Greece	3	1	2 (Note: One Appearance in Greek Super Cup)	0	—		2	0	6	1
Career total			305	22	43	2	3	0	63	2	414	26

=== International ===
As of 21 November 2023

Appearances and goals by national team and year
National team	Year	Apps	Goals
Greece	2018	4	0
Greece	2019	6	0
Greece	2020	5	0
Greece	2021	11	0
Greece	2022	9	1
Greece	2023	7	1
Total		42	1

Scores and results list Greece's goal tally first, score column indicates score after each Giakoumakis goal.

List of international goals scored by Giorgos Giakoumakis
No.	Date	Venue	Opponent	Score	Result	Competition
1	25 March 2022	Stadionul Steaua, Bucharest, Romania	Romania	1–0	1–0	Friendly

== Honours ==
=== Club ===
Olympiacos

- 6x Super League Greece: 2014–15, 2015–16, 2016–17, 2019–20, 2020–21, 2021–22
- 2x Greek Football Cup: 2014–15, 2019–20; runner-up: 2015–16, 2020–21

OFI

- Greek Super Cup: 2026

=== International ===
Greece U19

- UEFA European Under-19 Championship runner-up: 2012

=== Individual ===
- Super League Greece 2 Young Player of the Season: 2012–13
- Super League Greece Team of the Season: 2020–21
