= Ebus Onuchukwu =

Nigerian footballer

Personal information
- Full name: Ebus Chukwubuka Onuchukwu
- Date of birth: 9 April 1984 (age 42)
- Place of birth: Lagos, Nigeria
- Height: 1.86 m (6 ft 1 in)
- Position: Striker

Youth career
- Julius Berger F.C.

Senior career*
Years	Team	Apps	(Gls)
2002–2005	Julius Berger F.C.		
2005	Apolonia Fier	32	(15)
2006	Lamia		
2006–2007	Diagoras		
2007–2008	Atsalenios F.C.		
2008–2009	Ethnikos Katerini F.C.		
2009–2011	FK Fotbal Třinec	31	(11)
2011–2012	Lowestoft Town F.C.		
2012–	FC Baník Ostrava	5	(1)
- * Club domestic league appearances and goals

Ebus Chukwubuka Onuchukwu (born 9 April 1984 in Lagos) is a Nigerian football player who currently plays for FC Baník Ostrava in the Czech first division, Czech 1. Liga, as a striker.

== Career ==
He previously had spells at Ethnikos Katerini F.C. and Atsalenios F.C. in Greece.
