= Bertrand Gallou =

French footballer (born 1974)

Personal information
- Full name: Bertrand Gallou
- Date of birth: 9 May 1974 (age 52)
- Place of birth: Tours, France
- Height: 1.83 m (6 ft 0 in)
- Position: Goalkeeper

Senior career*
Years	Team	Apps	(Gls)
1993–1994	Tours	0	(0)
1994–1999	Mulhouse	50	(0)
2000–2001	Angoulême	0	(0)
2002–2003	Gap	?	(?)
- * Club domestic league appearances and goals

Bertrand Gallou (born 9 May 1974) is a French former professional footballer who played as a goalkeeper. Between 1994 and 1999, he played in Ligue 2 for FC Mulhouse.
