= Angelos Chanti =

Jordanian footballer (born in 1989)

Personal information
- Full name: Angelos Abdel Chanti
- Date of birth: 7 September 1989 (age 37)
- Place of birth: Pyrgos, Elis, Greece
- Height: 1.86 m (6 ft 1 in)
- Position: Attacking midfielder

Team information
- Current team: PAS Pyrgos
- Number: 10

Youth career
- –2006: Paniliakos
- 2006–2008: TONEGIDO

Senior career*
Years	Team	Apps	(Gls)
2008–2009	AS Trenčín	11	(0)
2010	Olympiakos Chersonissos	12	(4)
2010–2015	Ergotelis	102	(11)
2015–2016	Iraklis	7	(0)
2016–2018	OFI	36	(11)
2018	Aris	9	(1)
2018–2019	Aittitos Spata	6	(0)
2019	Luftëtari Gjirokastër	9	(2)
2019	Kavala	11	(1)
2020	Ierapetra	7	(1)
2020–2021	Egaleo	0	(0)
2021–2023	Panachaiki	28	(0)
2023–2024	Almyros Gaziou		
2024–	PAS Pyrgos	34	(9)

International career
2017–2018	Jordan	5	(1)
- * Club domestic league appearances and goals as of 27 September 2026

Angelos Abdel Chanti (Greek: Άγγελος Αμπντέλ Χαντί; born 7 September 1989), known in Jordan as Malek Shehadeh Ahmad Abdel-Hadi (Arabic: مالك شحادة أحمد عبد الهادي), is a professional footballer who plays as an attacking midfielder for Super League Greece 2 club PAS Pyrgos. Born in Greece, he has represented the Jordan national team.

== Club career ==
=== Early years ===
Chanti was born in Pyrgos, Elis to a Jordanian father and a Greek mother. He started playing youth football in Paniliakos of his hometown, before moving to Athens to attend Juan Ramón Rocha's football academy. He eventually signed his first professional contract abroad, joining Slovak First League side AS Trenčín in 2008. He played in 11 matches of the Slovak Corgoň Liga during his debut season, and followed the club to the Slovak First League after its relegation at the end of the 2007–08 season. He then returned to his country of birth Greece in January 2010, and joined Gamma Ethniki side Olympiakos Chersonissos, signing a 6-month contract.

=== Ergotelis ===
After impressing with his performances in the Gamma Ethniki, Chanti signed a 5-year contract with Super League side Ergotelis in 2010. He spent the next two season struggling to establish himself as a starter, but eventually solidified his place at the club's starting lineup during Ergotelis' short stay in the Football League during the 2012–13 season. In total, he made 34 league appearances and scored 4 goals, thus greatly contributing to the club's 2nd-place finish and swift return to the Super League. Chanti played for the Cretans in top-flight for two more seasons, and was appointed vice-captain of the team during his final season. In the summer transfer window of 2015, after Ergotelis was again relegated to the Football League, Chanti decided to move on. During his 5-year tenure with the club, Chanti summed up a total of 102 appearances and scored 11 goals in all competitions.

=== Iraklis ===
In June 2015, Chanti signed a two-year contract with the newly promoted Super League club Iraklis. However, as he was not gaining enough playing time, Chanti was released from his contract with Iraklis in January 2016.

=== OFI ===
After leaving Iraklis, Chanti returned to Crete, signing with ex-Super League side OFI in the Gamma Ethniki, the third tier of the Greek football league system. He contributed to the club's dynamic comeback to win the Group 4 championship with 4 goals in 14 appearances, and became a regular starter during the club's next two seasons in the Football League. His performances with OFI did not go unnoticed and in December 2017 he received his first call-up by the Jordanian national football team. However, as the club came to know financial instability at the end of 2017, Chanti freed himself from his contract in January 2018, when he filed a claim against the club for several months of unpaid wages.

=== Aris ===
On 29 January 2018, Chanti signed a contract with fellow Football League title contenders Aris until the end of the season. On 12 March 2018 he scored his first goal with a beautiful free-kick in a 3–0 home win against his former club Ergotelis.

=== Aittitos Spata ===
On 10 September 2018, he signed a contract with newly promoted side Aittitos Spata on a free transfer.

=== Luftëtari Gjirokastër ===
Chanti moved to Albania and signed with Luftëtari Gjirokastër on 24 January 2019.

== International career ==
Due to his dual citizenship, Chanti was eligible to play for either the Greek or the Jordanian national football team. On 7 December 2017 Chanti received, and accepted an offer to represent Jordan. He made his debut on 25 December 2017 in a 1–1 friendly tie versus Libya.

== Career statistics ==
=== Club ===
As of matches played 30 May 2019

Club	Season	League			Cup		Europe		Other		Total	
Club	Season	Division	Apps	Goals	Apps	Goals	Apps	Goals	Apps	Goals	Apps	Goals
AS Trenčín	2007–08	Slovak Corgoň Liga	11	0	0	0	—		—		11	0
AS Trenčín	2008–09	Slovak First League	?	?	0	0	—		—		?	?
Total			11	0	0	0	—		—		11	0
Olympiakos Chersonissos	2009−10	Gamma Ethniki	12	4	0	0	—		—		12	4
Total			12	4	0	0	—		—		12	4
Ergotelis	2010–11	Super League Greece	6	0	0	0	—		—		6	0
Ergotelis	2011–12	Super League Greece	8	1	0	0	—		—		8	1
Ergotelis	2012–13	Football League	34	4	1	0	—		—		35	4
Ergotelis	2013–14	Super League Greece	31	3	0	0	—		—		31	3
Ergotelis	2014–15	Super League Greece	22	3	0	0	—		—		22	3
Total			101	11	1	0	—		—		102	11
Iraklis	2015−16	Super League Greece	7	0	2	1	—		—		9	1
Total			7	0	2	1	—		—		9	1
OFI	2015−16	Gamma Ethniki	14	4	0	0	—		—		14	4
OFI	2016–17	Football League	28	9	6	2	—		—		34	11
OFI	2017–18	Football League	8	3	2	1	—		—		10	4
Total			50	16	8	3	—		—		58	19
Aris	2017–18	Football League	9	1	0	0	—		—		9	1
Total			9	1	0	0	—		—		9	1
Aittitos Spata	2018–19	Football League	9	2	5	0	—		—		14	2
Total			9	2	5	0	—		—		14	2
Career total			199	37	13	4	—		—		215	38

=== International ===
Jordan
Year	Apps	Goals
2017	1	0
2018	4	1
Total	5	1

=== International goals ===
No.	Date	Venue	Opponent	Score	Result	Competition
1	15 January 2018	Zayed Sports City Stadium, Abu Dhabi, United Arab Emirates	Denmark League XI	1–0	3–2	Friendly

== Honours ==
OFI

- Gamma Ethniki: 2015–16
