= Thomas Dos Santos =

Footballer (born 1992)

Personal information
- Date of birth: 13 March 1992 (age 34)
- Place of birth: Bayonne, France
- Height: 1.75 m (5 ft 9 in)
- Position: Midfielder

Team information
- Current team: Genêts Anglet

Youth career
- –2009: Bayonne
- 2009–2010: Nantes

Senior career*
Years	Team	Apps	(Gls)
2010–2011	Bayonne B	0	(0)
2011–2012	Corte	14	(2)
2012–2013	Puertollano	0	(0)
2013	Croisés de Bayonne	4	(3)
2013–2014	Lens B	9	(0)
2014–2015	Bayonne	22	(7)
2015	Ergotelis	7	(0)
2015–2016	Bayonne	12	(3)
2016–2017	Genêts Anglet	26	(7)
2017–2022	Aviron Bayonnais	84	(9)
2022–	Genêts Anglet	17	(3)
- * Club domestic league appearances and goals as of 09:56, 30 June 2023 (UTC)

Thomas Dos Santos (born 13 March 1992) is a French-Portuguese professional footballer who plays as a midfielder for French lower-league club Genêts Anglet.

== Career ==
Dos Santos was born in Bayonne, France. He began his football career with local side Aviron Bayonnais. He moved to Nantes U-19 in 2009, and went on to play for a number of amateur clubs in the CFA, CFA 2 and Aquitaine Honneur, with a short spell with Spanish Tercera División club Puertollano. On 6 August 2015, Dos Santos signed his first professional contract in Greece with Football League club Ergotelis. He left the club during the 2015 Christmas break due to unpaid wages, and returned to France, and the CFA 2 after joining Genêts Anglet in 2016.

In June 2017 Dos Santos returned to former club Aviron Bayonnais.
