= Chrysovalantis Kozoronis =

Greek footballer (born 1992)

Personal information
- Date of birth: 3 August 1992 (age 34)
- Place of birth: Heraklion, Crete, Greece
- Height: 1.79 m (5 ft 10 1/2 in)
- Position: Defensive midfielder

Team information
- Current team: Giouchtas
- Number: 8

Youth career
- –2012: Ergotelis

Senior career*
Years	Team	Apps	(Gls)
2012–2015	Ergotelis	70	(3)
2015–2017	PAS Giannina	60	(4)
2018	Hamilton Academical	0	(0)
2018–2019	Ergotelis	8	(1)
2019	Petrolul Ploiești	9	(0)
2019–2020	Levadiakos	18	(1)
2020–2022	Panevėžys	44	(2)
2022–2024	Anagennisi Karditsa	36	(5)
2024	Kalamata	10	(0)
2024–2025	Panachaiki	13	(0)
2025	Anagennisi Karditsa		
2025–	Giouchtas		
- * Club domestic league appearances and goals as of 13 August 2023

Chrysovalantis Kozoronis (Greek: Χρυσοβαλάντης Κοζορώνης, born 3 August 1992) is a Greek professional footballer who plays as a defensive midfielder for Gamma Ethniki club Giouchtas.

== Career ==
=== Ergotelis ===
Kozoronis started his career with the youth teams of Ergotelis, and signed his first professional contract with the club on 24 May 2012, when the club played in the Football League, the second tier of the Greek football league system. He contributed with 2 goals in 26 appearances to his club's 2nd-place finish and subsequent promotion to top flight. In total, over the course of three seasons, Kozoronis made a total of 74 appearances for Ergotelis in all competitions, while also scoring 4 times. At the end of the 2014−15 season, Ergotelis were relegated from the Super League, and as a result, Kozoronis terminated his contract with the club to sign for Super League side PAS Giannina.

=== PAS Giannina ===
In the summer of 2015 he signed a three-year contract with PAS Giannina. Kozoronis made 60 league appearances and scored 4 goals for PAS Giannina. He also made 4 appearances in the Europa League and 8 in the Greek Cup. On 19 December 2017 he was released from his contract after an out of court settlement.

=== Hamilton Academical ===
On 10 January 2018, Kozoronis joined Hamilton Academical on a deal until the end of the 2018–19 season.

On 20 March 2018, Kozoronis was released by Hamilton having failed to play a single game for the club and making just one appearance on the bench.

=== Return to Ergotelis ===
On 13 September 2018, Kozoronis returned to his former club Ergotelis, signing a one-year contract.

=== Petrolul Ploiești ===
On 10 January 2019, Petrolul Ploiești announced the signing of the 26-year-old Greek defensive midfielder until the summer of 2020.

=== Levadiakos ===
On 23 August 2019, Levadiakos announced the signing of the Greek defensive midfielder until the summer of 2020.

=== FK Panevėžys ===
On 19 August 2020, Panevrėžys announced the signing of the Greek defensive midfielder until the summer of 2021.

On 3 August 2022 he left FK Panevėžys.

== Career statistics ==
As of match played 6 October 2021

Appearances and goals by club, season and competition
Club	Season	League			National Cup		League Cup		Other		Total	
Club	Season	Division	Apps	Goals	Apps	Goals	Apps	Goals	Apps	Goals	Apps	Goals
Ergotelis	2012–13	Football League	26	2	1	0	—		—		27	2
Ergotelis	2013–14	Super League Greece	22	0	2	0	—		—		24	0
Ergotelis	2014–15	Super League Greece	22	1	1	1	—		—		23	2
Ergotelis	Ergotelis total		70	3	4	1	—		—		74	4
PAS Giannina	2015–16	Super League Greece	23	2	2	0	—		—		25	2
PAS Giannina	2016–17	Super League Greece	29	2	3	0	—		4 (Note: Appearances in the Europa League)	0	36	2
PAS Giannina	2017–18	Super League Greece	8	0	3	0	—		—		11	0
PAS Giannina	PAS Giannina total		60	4	8	0	—		4	0	72	4
Hamilton Academical	2017–18	Scottish Premiership	0	0	0	0	—		—		0	0
Hamilton Academical	Hamilton Academical total		0	0	0	0	—		—		0	0
Ergotelis	2018–19	Football League	8	1	3	0	—		—		11	1
Ergotelis	Ergotelis total		8	1	3	0	—		—		11	1
Petrolul	2018–19	Liga II	9	0	0	0	—		—		9	0
Petrolul	Petrolul total		9	0	0	0	—		—		9	0
Levadiakos	2019–20	Super League Greece 2	17	1	0	0	—		—		17	1
Levadiakos	Levadiakos total		17	1	0	0	—		—		17	1
Panevėžys	2020	A Lyga	5	1	2	0	—		—		7	1
Panevėžys	2021	A Lyga	27	1	4	1	—		2 (Note: Appearances in the Europa Conference League)	0	33	2
Panevėžys	Panevėžys total		32	2	6	1	—		2	0	40	3
Career total			196	11	21	2	0	0	6	0	223	13

== Honours ==
Panevėžys

- Lithuanian Cup: 2020
- Lithuanian Supercup: 2021
