= Marcos Bambam =

Brazilian footballer (born 1991)

Bambam
Personal information
- Full name: Marcos Antonio Simão Pereira
- Date of birth: 19 March 1991 (age 35)
- Place of birth: Mossoró, Brazil
- Height: 1.75 m (5 ft 9 in)
- Position: Forward

Senior career*
Years	Team	Apps	(Gls)
2008–2009	Fortaleza	11	(4)
2009–2010	Internacional	0	(0)
2010	→ Vitória (loan)	1	(0)
2011	Juazeiro	0	(0)
2011–2013	Grêmio B	0	(0)
2012	→ Guarani de Juazeiro (loan)	8	(1)
2012	→ Maracanã (loan)		
2013	→ Iguatu (loan)	4	(1)
2013–2015	Ergotelis	14	(2)
2015	Apollon Smyrnis	8	(1)
2019	Hercílio Luz		
2019	Concórdia		
2019	Victoria Hotspurs		
- * Club domestic league appearances and goals as of 3:14 8 June 2015 (UTC)

Marcos Antônio Simão Pereira, commonly known as Marcos Bambam or simply Bambam (born 19 March 1991) is a Brazilian football player who plays as a forward. His nickname "Bambam" originates from The Flintstones cartoon character, Bamm-Bamm Rubble. He currently plays for Brazilian Campeonato Catarinense club Concórdia.

== Career ==
Bambam began drawing attention to himself at the São Paulo Junior Football Cups of 2008 and 2009 playing for Fortaleza. He was eventually acquired by Internacional, who, kept him in the infrastructure segments, and loaned him out to Vitória in the 2010 season. Having played in very few matches, his loan spell ended in November.

After a brief stint with Juazeiro, Bambam signed with Grêmio B in 2011. In 2012, he was loaned to Guarani de Juazeiro to play in the Campeonato Cearense. Later the same year, he was loaned to Maracanã. In 2013, Bambam went on his third Grêmio loaning spell, this time to Iguatu, but was returned to Grêmio after failing to make an impact in the club's attack.

Having struggled to establish himself in his homeland, a 22-year-old Bambam ventured to Greece in August 2013, where he signed with Super League side Ergotelis. Despite immediately making an impact for his new club, misfortune struck as he suffered a season-ending injury in October. Following his recovery, Bambam struggled to maintain his place in the Cretans' roster, and was eventually released in January 2015. In March, he signed a contract with fellow Greek side Apollon Smyrnis. He left the club at the end of the season.

Ahead of the 2019–20 season, Bambam joined Maltese club Victoria Hotspurs.
