= Stavros Labrakis =

Greek footballer and manager

Personal information
- Date of birth: 26 February 1970 (age 56)
- Place of birth: Heraklion, Crete, Greece
- Height: 1.77 m (5 ft 9 1/2 in)
- Position: Attacking midfielder

Team information
- Current team: Ergotelis (General Manager)

Youth career
- Kaminia

Senior career*
Years	Team	Apps	(Gls)
–1994	Olympiakos Chersonissos		
1994–1996	Irodotos		
1996–1997	Ergotelis	28	(4)
1997–1998	Ialysos		
1998–2000	A.O. Agersani Naxos	32	(12)
2000–2005	Ergotelis	139	(42)

Managerial career
- 2005–2016: Ergotelis (general manager)
- 2013: → head coach
- 2014: → interim manager
- 2015: → interim manager
- 2015–2016: → head coach
- 2016–2017: OFI (general manager)
- 2017–: Ergotelis (general manager)
- * Club domestic league appearances and goals as of 9 April 2021

Stavros Labrakis (Greek: Σταύρος Λαμπράκης; born 26 February 1970) is a Greek former football player, and manager. He is currently serving as general manager for Greek Football League club Ergotelis.

== Club career ==
Labrakis started his football career with local side Kaminia F.C. He then went on to play for Irodotos, Ergotelis, Ialysos and A.O. Agersani Naxos, before returning to Ergotelis in 2000. His goals and precise passing made him a key player in Ergotelis' run towards celebrating three consecutive promotions from the Delta Ethniki, and managed to play in the Alpha Ethniki for the first time in his career at age 35.

=== Ergotelis ===
In his first two seasons after his return at Ergotelis in 2000, Labrakis finished as club top-scorer in the Delta Ethniki, consistently scoring 13 goals each season. He then scored 12 goals in 36 games during the 2002−03 Gamma Ethniki season to help his club promote to the Beta Ethniki. He scored another two during the 2003−04 Beta Ethniki season. Labrakis ended his football career at the end of the 2004–05 season, having played in a total of 21 league matches in which he scored 2 goals, both with penalty kicks. Both his league goals came consecutively in December 2004, during a 4−1 home win vs. Apollon Kalamarias and a 2−1 home win vs. Egaleo.

In total, Labrakis has scored 20 times for Ergotelis in Greek professional divisions (not counting his 26 goals in the Delta Ethniki). Counting his performances in the Delta Ethniki, he is the second all-time top-scorer for the club, trailing behind club scoring legend Patrick Ogunsoto, with whom he was teammates during his second spell at Ergotelis.

== Retirement and career as manager ==
After ending his professional career, Labrakis was offered, and currently holds the position of general manager at Ergotelis. He has also managed the club in single matches as interim coach in several occasions, mainly during managerial changes. In 2013 Labrakis, along with the club's longtime U-20 coach Vasilis Plesitis, led the club through 8 Football League matches to eventual promotion to the league after head coach Siniša Gogić' contract was terminated by the club. More of the same came for Labrakis in 2015, when he was called upon to take over as head coach for the club, after Ergotelis mutually terminated its contract with manager Jasminko Velić.

=== Managerial statistics ===
As of 27 November 2017

Team	From	To	Record				
Team	From	To	G	W	D	L	Win %
Ergotelis	16 April 2013	14 June 2013	8	6	1	1	75.00
Ergotelis (interim)	13 January 2014	20 January 2014	1	0	1	0	0.00
Ergotelis (interim)	12 February 2015	14 February 2015	1	0	0	1	0.00
Ergotelis	21 October 2015	9 February 2016	16	5	4	7	31.25
Career totals			26	11	6	9	42.31
