= Zacharias Kavousakis =

Greek footballer (born 1989)

Personal information
- Date of birth: 11 January 1989 (age 37)
- Place of birth: Heraklion, Crete, Greece
- Height: 1.87 m (6 ft 1 1/2 in)
- Position: Goalkeeper

Team information
- Current team: Atsalenios

Youth career
- −2008: Ergotelis

Senior career*
Years	Team	Apps	(Gls)
2008–2015	Ergotelis	28	(0)
2015–2017	AEL	12	(0)
2017	Panetolikos	0	(0)
2017–2018	Asteras Amaliada	9	(0)
2020–2022	Panserraikos	34	(0)
2022–2023	Olympiacos Volos		
2023–	Atsalenios		
- * Club domestic league appearances and goals as of 27 February 2022 (UTC)

Zacharias Kavousakis (Greek: Ζαχαρίας Καβουσάκης, born 11 January 1989) is a Greek professional footballer who plays as a goalkeeper for Gamma Ethniki club Atsalenios.

== Career ==
Kavousakis started his career with local Heraklion-based Super League club Ergotelis and signed his first professional contract on 21 February 2008. He remained at the club for 7 seasons mostly as a back-up goalkeeper, making a total of 32 appearances across all competitions.

On 23 July 2015, Kavousakis signed a 3-year contract with Football League side AEL, with whom he celebrated promotion to the Super League, again mostly as a back-up keeper. After 1,5 years on 28 January 2017, Kavousakis was released from his contract with the club on mutual consent, after the arrival of Kostas Theodoropoulos effectively demoted him to 3rd-choice keeper. One day after his release from AEL, on 29 January 2017, Kavousakis signed a 6-month contract with fellow Super League side Panetolikos. but left the club at the end of the season having made no official appearances.

In September 2017, Kavousakis signed with Gamma Ethniki side Asteras Amaliada, with whom he had 9 full 90' appearances until relations with the club fell through and he was released in December.

After three years without club, Kavousakis signed with Panserraikos on 26 February 2020. In the summer of 2020, Kavousakis signed a new three-year deal with the club until July 2023, after the club was promoted to the Football League Greece for the 2020–21 season.
