= Christos Chrysofakis =

Greek professional footballer

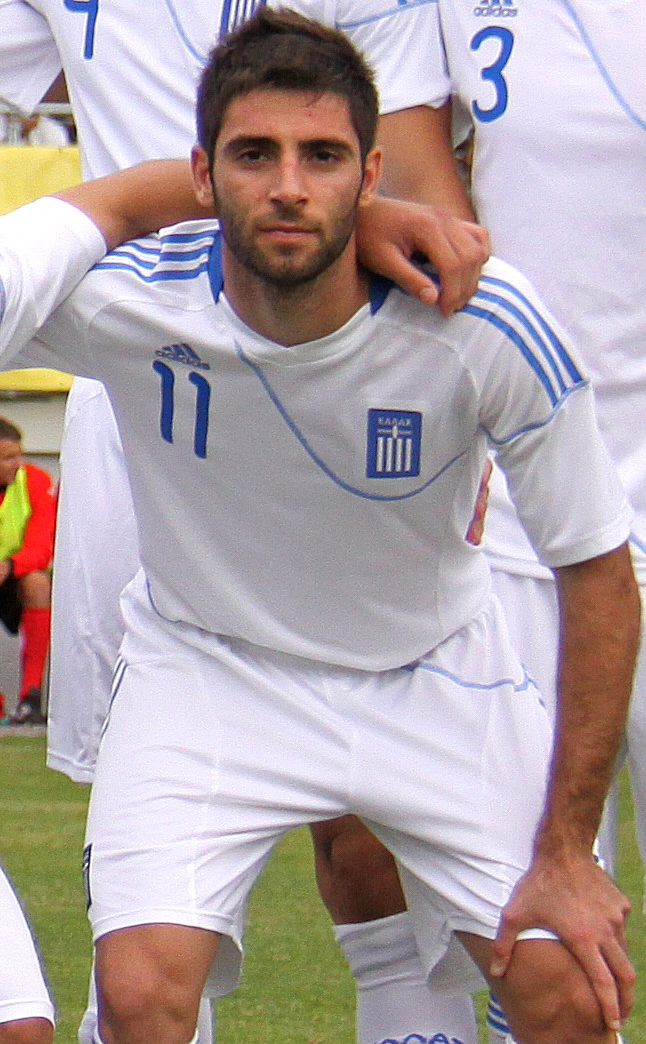
- Chrysofakis playing for Greece U21

Personal information
- Date of birth: 18 January 1990 (age 36)
- Place of birth: Ierapetra, Crete, Greece
- Height: 1.75 m (5 ft 9 in)
- Position: Midfielder

Team information
- Current team: Ierapetra
- Number: 7

Youth career
- AS Ierapetra
- –2008: Ergotelis

Senior career*
Years	Team	Apps	(Gls)
2008–2015	Ergotelis	33	(2)
2014	→ Panegialios (loan)	7	(1)
2015–2017	OF Ierapetra		
2017–2018	AS Ierapetra		
2018–2019	Agios Nikolaos		
2019–	OF Ierapetra	9	(0)

International career^{‡}
2008–2010	Greece U19	3	(0)
2010–2011	Greece U21	6	(0)
- * Club domestic league appearances and goals as of 6 July 2020 ‡ National team caps and goals as of 6 July 2018

Christos Chrysofakis (Greek: Χρήστος Χρυσοφάκης, born 18 January 1990) is a Greek professional footballer who plays as a midfielder for Super League 2 club Ierapetra.

== Club career ==
Chrysofakis started his career at his local club AS Ierapetra before joining Ergotelis' youth team. He signed his first professional contract with the club on 22 July 2008. He spent the next seven years with Ergotelis, appearing in a total of 33 matches and scoring 2 goals. On 2 January 2014, he was loaned out to Football League side Panegialios until the end of the season. On 28 January 2015, he returned to his home town Ierapetra, signing with local club OF Ierapetra. In the summer of 2017, he moved to fellow local club AS Ierapetra. After spending another season at fellow Lasithi FCA A Division contenders Agios Nikolaos, Chrysofakis returned to OF Ierapetra, playing in the Football League.

== International career ==
Chrysofakis is a former U19 and U21 international with Greece, having made his debut in a UEFA Under-19 Championship qualifier against Bosnia and Herzegovina.
