= Dimitrios Kotsonis =

Greek footballer

Personal information
- Full name: Dimitrios Kotsonis
- Date of birth: 25 January 1989 (age 37)
- Place of birth: Athens, Greece
- Height: 1.90 m (6 ft 3 in)
- Position: Centre back

Team information
- Current team: Anagennisi Karditsa
- Number: 39

Youth career
- 2006–2008: Paniliakos

Senior career*
Years	Team	Apps	(Gls)
2008–2011	Paniliakos	68	(0)
2011–2013	Aris	1	(0)
2013	Ergotelis	1	(0)
2013–2014	Paniliakos	23	(4)
2014–2015	Apollon Smyrnis	27	(2)
2015–2017	Lamia	37	(1)
2017–2018	Trikala	21	(1)
2018–2019	Panachaiki	1	(0)
2019	Luftëtari	14	(1)
2019–2020	Panachaiki	5	(0)
2020	Aiolikos	0	(0)
2021	Ionikos	14	(1)
2021–	Anagennisi Karditsa	1	(0)
- * Club domestic league appearances and goals as of 7 November 2021

Dimitrios Kotsonis (Greek: Δημήτριος Κοτσώνης; born 25 January 1989) is a Greek professional footballer who plays as a centre back for Super League 2 club Anagennisi Karditsa.
