= Christos Gromitsaris =

Greek footballer (born 1991)

Personal information
- Date of birth: 10 February 1991 (age 35)
- Place of birth: Agrinio, Greece
- Height: 1.85 m (6 ft 1 in)
- Position: Centre-back

Team information
- Current team: Asteras Tripolis B
- Number: 34

Youth career
- –2008: Elpides Agrinio
- 2008–2010: Atromitos

Senior career*
Years	Team	Apps	(Gls)
2010–2014	Atromitos	0	(0)
2010	→ Agia Paraskevi (loan)	12	(1)
2011	→ P.A.O. Rouf (loan)	13	(1)
2011–2012	→ Apollon Smyrnis (loan)	14	(0)
2012–2013	→ Vyzas Megara (loan)	41	(0)
2014	Ionikos	12	(0)
2014–2015	Fostiras	26	(0)
2015	Ergotelis	13	(1)
2016–2018	Kerkyra	39	(2)
2018–2019	AEL	13	(0)
2019–2021	Chania	37	(1)
2021–2024	Niki Volos	51	(1)
2024	Makedonikos	11	(0)
2024–	Asteras Tripolis B	31	(1)
- * Club domestic league appearances and goals as of 22 March 2026

Christos Gromitsaris (Greek: Χρήστος Γρομητσάρης, born 10 February 1991) is a Greek professional footballer who plays as a centre-back for Super League 2 club Asteras Tripolis B.

== Career ==
Gromitsaris began his football career with local amateur club Elpides Agrinio, before being acquired by Athenian club Atromitos at the age of 17. Gromitsaris was promoted to the men's team two years later, and was consecutively loaned out to Gamma Ethniki clubs Agia Paraskevi, P.A.O. Rouf and Apollon Smyrnis to receive substantial playing time. He then made his debut in the Football League with Vyzas Megara, still on loan from Atromitos, recording a total of 41 appearances, almost exclusively as a starter. He would however not get any playing time upon his return to the Peristeri-based club in the 2013–14 season, and therefore in January 2014, Gromitsaris moved to Gamma Ethniki side Ionikos on a free transfer. Six months later, Gromitsaris signed a contract with Football League side Fostiras. After recording 26 appearances for the Tavros-based club, Gromitsaris signed a 1-year contract with the ex-Super League club Ergotelis. He reportedly terminated his contract with the club on 30 December 2015, having made a total of 13 appearances and scoring 1 goal. On 7 January 2016, Gromitsaris signed a 2,5-year contract with fellow Football League side Kerkyra.
