= Lefteris Gialousis =

Greek footballer

Personal information
- Full name: Eleftherios Gialousis
- Date of birth: 18 July 1985 (age 41)
- Place of birth: Heraklion, Crete, Greece
- Height: 1.81 m (5 ft 11 in)
- Position: Right back

Team information
- Current team: Almyros Gazi

Youth career
- Irodotos

Senior career*
Years	Team	Apps	(Gls)
2003–2006	Irodotos	10	(0)
2006–2012	Ergotelis	78	(1)
2012–2013	Asteras Tripolis	9	(0)
2013–2015	Olympiacos Volos	63	(2)
2015–2016	Ergotelis	15	(0)
2016	Kavala	0	(0)
2017	Kissamikos	15	(0)
2017–2019	Irodotos	11	(3)
2019–	Almyros Gazi		
- * Club domestic league appearances and goals as of 15 January 2019

Lefteris Gialousis (Greek: Λευτέρης Γιαλούσης; born 18 July 1985) is a Greek football defender who plays for Greek club Almyros Gazi in the Heraklion FCA A1 Championship, a regional league in the fifth tier of the Greek football league system.

== Professional career ==
Gialousis began his career playing with local Heraklion side Irodotos, in the Gamma and Delta Ethniki. After three-and-a-half seasons with Irodotos, the more prominent Heraklion clubs had taken notice of his performances, and during the winter transfer window of the 2006–07 season Gialousis signed with Greek Super League club Ergotelis. Gialousis did however not make an appearance for the club in the season. In the 2007–08 season, Gialousis made his Super League debut on 16 February 2008, playing all 90 minutes in a 1–0 loss to Greek champions Olympiacos at Karaiskakis Stadium. After a fine performance against Olympiacos, Gialousis kept his place in the starting XI of the team for the rest of the season. He went on to make 78 appearances in the Super League with Ergotelis within a span of six years before departing the club in 2012, having scored one goal.

Οn 13 July 2012, Gialousis signed a contract with Asteras Tripolis. He made a total of 9 appearances for the club before his contract was terminated. On 16 July 2013, Gialousis signed with Greek Football League club Olympiacos Volos. He remained with the club for two seasons making a total of 63 appearances and scoring 2 goals. On 6 August 2015, Gialousis returned to Ergotelis, playing in the Greek Football League and was one of the 17 players who still remained in the club's roster despite financial issues, which ultimately forced the club to withdraw from professional competitions.
