= Vangelis Georgiou =

Greek footballer

Personal information
- Full name: Evangelos Georgiou
- Date of birth: 4 November 1988 (age 37)
- Place of birth: Thessaloniki, Greece
- Height: 1.78 m (5 ft 10 in)
- Positions: Left back; left winger

Senior career*
Years	Team	Apps	(Gls)
2007–2011	PAOK FC	3	(0)
2009	→ Kavala (loan)	7	(0)
2009–2010	→ Panserraikos (loan)	18	(0)
2011–2012	Anagennisi Epanomi	22	(2)
2012–2013	Ergotelis	24	(1)
2013–2014	Aiginiakos		
2014–2015	Ermionida		
2015	Chania		
2016	Apollon Kalamarias		
2016–	Makedonikos		

International career
2008	Greece U21	2	(0)
- * Club domestic league appearances and goals

Vangelis Georgiou (Greek: Βαγγέλης Γεωργίου; born 4 November 1988) is a Greek footballer.

== Career ==
Born in Thessaloniki, Georgiou began playing football with local side PAOK. After a one-year loan period to Panserraikos, he returned to PAOK, but finally he was not in the plans of the new manager of the team. On 5 August 2011, he agreed to terminate his contract.

He often plays as a left defender but occasionally plays as a left midfielder.
