= Cheikh Gadiaga =

Senegalese footballer

Personal information
- Full name: Cheikh Gadiaga Sergine
- Date of birth: November 30, 1979 (age 46)
- Place of birth: Senegal
- Height: 1.87 m (6 ft 2 in)
- Position: Midfielder

Team information
- Current team: Asteras Amaliada F.C.

Senior career*
Years	Team	Apps	(Gls)
1995–1996	ASC Niayes Pikine	?	(?)
1996–1998	ASC Yego Dakar	?	(?)
1998	Yanbian Century	4	(0)
1999–2001	R.W.D. Molenbeek	81	(16)
2001–2003	K. Lierse S.K.	50	(5)
2003–2005	R.A.E.C. Mons	7	(0)
2006–2007	Hapoel Petach Tikva	28	(2)
2007–2008	Alki Larnaca	23	(1)
2008–2009	AEL Limassol	22	(1)
2009–2012	Ermis Aradippou	78	(1)
2012–2013	Ergotelis	26	(1)
2013–2015	Panachaiki	50	(3)
2015–2016	Panargiakos F.C.	23	(2)
2016–2017	Asteras Amaliada F.C.	17	(1)

International career^{‡}
2001	Senegal	7	(0)
- * Club domestic league appearances and goals ‡ National team caps and goals as of October 8, 2012

Cheikh Gadiaga (born 30 November 1979) is a Senegalese football midfielder who plays for Gamma Ethniki club Asteras Amaliada F.C. in Greece. He was called up to the Senegal national team in 2001.
