= Vasilios Rentzas =

Greek footballer

Personal information
- Date of birth: 16 April 1992 (age 34)
- Place of birth: Melivoia, Greece
- Height: 1.76 m (5 ft 9 1/2 in)
- Position: Right-back

Youth career
- –2010: Filoktitis Melivia

Senior career*
Years	Team	Apps	(Gls)
2010–2011	AEL	7	(0)
2011–2016	Ergotelis	50	(1)
2016–2018	AEL	57	(2)
2018–2020	Panionios	23	(0)
2020–2021	Chania	12	(0)
2021–2023	Kallithea	36	(0)
2024	Nea Artaki		
2024–2025	Pierikos		

International career
2011	Greece U19	2	(0)
- * Club domestic league appearances and goals as of 16 June 2023

Vasilios Rentzas (Greek: Βασίλειος Ρέντζας; born 16 April 1992) is a Greek professional footballer who plays as a right-back.

== Career ==
Born in Melivoia, Rentzas played as an amateur at the local team Filoktitis, until he signed a 5-year professional contract with AEL, on 15 June 2010. He made his professional club debut on 26 October 2010 playing against Ethnikos Piraeus during the 4th round of the Greek Football Cup.

In August 2011, Rentzas was released from his contract with AEL after the club was relegated at the end of the 2010–11 season, and went on to sign a 5-year contract with Super League Cretan side Ergotelis on August 30, 2011. His contract was renewed for another year on 1 September 2015. After the team withdrew from professional competitions in January 2016, due to major financial problems, Rentzas, who was one of the team's veterans with 61 appearances and 1 goal over the course of 4,5 years and part of only 17 players who had stayed with the club until the very end, was released from his professional contract. Consequently, on 30 January 2016 he returned to AEL once more signing a 2,5-year contract. On July 11, 2018, his move to Panionios got announced.

== Career statistics ==
=== Club ===
As of 18 July 2020

Club	Season	League			Cup		Continental		Other		Total	
Club	Season	Division	Apps	Goals	Apps	Goals	Apps	Goals	Apps	Goals	Apps	Goals
AEL	2010–11	Super League Greece	7	0	1	0	—		—		8	0
Ergotelis	2011–12	Super League Greece	2	0	1	0	—		—		3	0
Ergotelis	2012–13	Super League Greece 2	12	0	1	0	—		—		13	0
Ergotelis	2013-14	Super League Greece	13	0	2	0	—		—		15	0
Ergotelis	2014-15	Super League Greece	12	0	3	0	—		—		15	0
Ergotelis	2015-16	Super League Greece	11	1	4	0	—		—		15	0
Ergotelis	Total	Super League Greece	50	1	11	0	—		—		61	1
AEL	2015–16	Super League Greece 2	10	0	—		—		—		10	0
AEL	2016–17	Super League Greece	25	2	0	0	—		—		25	2
AEL	2017–18	Super League Greece	22	0	6	0	—		—		28	0
AEL	Total		57	2	6	0	—		—		63	2
Panionios	2018–19	Super League Greece	2	0	1	0	—		—		3	0
Panionios	2019–20	Super League Greece	21	0	4	0	—		—		25	0
Panionios	Total		23	0	5	0	—		—		28	0
Chania	2020–21	Super League Greece 2	4	0	—		—		—		4	0
Career total			141	3	23	0	0	0	0	0	164	3
