= Minas Pitsos =

Greek footballer

Personal information
- Date of birth: 18 October 1980 (age 46)
- Place of birth: Heraklion, Greece
- Height: 1.78 m (5 ft 10 in)
- Position: Defender

Team information
- Current team: A.E. Neapoli (manager)

Youth career
- –1998: OFI

Senior career*
Years	Team	Apps	(Gls)
1998–2002	OFI	24	(1)
2002–2003	Panathinaikos	16	(0)
2003–2012	OFI	179	(1)
2012–2016	Ergotelis	87	(2)
2016	OFI	4	(0)
Total		310	(4)

International career
2002	Greece U17	2	(0)
2003	Greece U21	3	(0)

Managerial career
- 2016–2017: OFI (assistant)
- 2017: OFI (caretaker)
- 2021–2022: P.A.O. Krousonas
- 2022–2023: Atsalenios
- 2023–2024: Ermis Zoniana
- 2024: Ergotelis
- 2025–2026: Episkopi
- 2026–: A.E. Neapoli
- * Club domestic league appearances and goals

Minas Pitsos (Greek: Μηνάς Πίτσος, born 18 October 1980) is a Greek professional football manager and former footballer, who played as a left-back. He spent the majority of his career representing clubs of his hometown Heraklion across various levels of the Greek football league system, with a short spell in Athens-based Greek giants Panathinaikos. He currently holds the position of technical director at OFI's U19 squad.

== Career ==
=== OFI ===
Pitsos began his football career in the youth teams of his local side OFI and signed his first professional contract with the club in 1998, aged 18 years old. He made his official debut on 9 November 2000, playing in the 2nd leg of the 2000–01 UEFA Cup Second Round vs. Slavia Prague. His domestic league debut came four days later, during a 2000–01 Alpha Ethniki match vs. Skoda Xanthi.

=== Panathinaikos ===
In January 2002, Pitsos was transferred to Panathinaikos, after impressing with his performance during a league match vs. Egaleo held in Panathinaikos' home ground, Leoforos Alexandras Stadium. His debut for the "Greens" came on 9 February 2002 in a 0–1 away win vs. his former club OFI. Ten days later, he would make his debut in the UEFA Champions League, playing the full 90 minutes during a Group Stage away win vs. Sparta Praha. However, as he was not considered as a first choice of Panathinaikos manager Sergio Markarián, who replaced Fernando Santos in October 2002, Pitsos, who had made a total of just 6 appearances during the 2002–03 season, decided to terminate his contract with Panathinaikos and return to OFI to get more playing time.

=== Back to OFI ===
Pitsos spent the next 9 years at a declining OFI, during which he played in over 170 matches. In his second spell with the club, he played in the 2007 UEFA Intertoto Cup, making his final two appearances in European competitions, as well as the Greek 2nd Division, as the club went into a meltdown and was relegated at the end of the 2008–09 season. Pitsos eventually returned to top flight with OFI, as the club promoted to the Super League Greece after spending two years in the Football League. However, OFI's financial obligations to former players resulted in the club failing to obtain a licence to enter the transfer market, and thus Pitsos' contract ended in 2012, and could not be renewed.

=== Ergotelis ===
As a free agent, Pitsos signed a contract with OFI's local rival Ergotelis, at the time playing in the Football League. Pitsos was instrumental in Ergotelis' eventual promotion to the Super League, making 32 appearances and scoring two goals, thus earning a contract renewal deal by the club. He stayed at the club for an additional 3 years, following Ergotelis back to the Football League after the club was relegated at the end of the 2014–15 season and was one of just 17 players to remain part of the club's roster as Ergotelis' financial issues finally forced the club to withdraw from professional competitions in January 2016. As a result, Pitsos, along with the rest of the club roster, were released from their contracts.

=== Return to OFI ===
Aged nearly 36, Pitsos, who had previously expressed his wish to end his career with OFI, signed with his former club, now playing in the Greek 3rd Division, on 29 January 2016. After winning the division title, Pitsos announced his retirement on 6 July 2016. He was immediately offered, and currently holds the position of technical director at OFI's U-19 squad.

== Career statistics ==
Club performance			League		Cup		League Cup		Continental		Total	
Season	Club	League	Apps	Goals	Apps	Goals	Apps	Goals	Apps	Goals	Apps	Goals
Greece			League		Greek Cup		League Cup		Europe		Total	
1999–2000	OFI	Alpha Ethniki	0	0	0	0	—				0	0
2000–01	OFI	Alpha Ethniki	11	0	0	0	—		1	0	12	0
2001–02	OFI	Alpha Ethniki	12	1	0	0	—				12	1
Total			23	1	0	0	—		1	0	24	1
2001–02	Panathinaikos	Alpha Ethniki	8	0	0	0	—		2	0	10	0
2002–03	Panathinaikos	Alpha Ethniki	5	0	0	0	—		1	0	6	0
Total			13	0	0	0	—		3	0	16	0
2003–04	OFI	Alpha Ethniki	3	0	0	0	—				3	0
2004–05	OFI	Alpha Ethniki	17	0	0	0	—				17	0
2005–06	OFI	Alpha Ethniki	23	0	0	0	—				23	0
2006–07	OFI	Super League Greece	26	1	3	0	—				29	1
2007–08	OFI	Super League Greece	25	0	5	0	—		2	0	32	0
2008–09	OFI	Super League Greece	9	0	0	0	—				9	0
2009–10	OFI	Beta Ethniki	26	0	0	0	—				26	0
2010–11	OFI	Football League	24	0	0	0	—				24	0
2011–12	OFI	Super League	11	0	5	0	—				16	0
Total			164	1	13	0	—		2	0	179	1
2012–13	Ergotelis	Football League	32	2	0	0	—				32	2
2013–14	Ergotelis	Super League	25	0	1	0	—				26	0
2014–15	Ergotelis	Super League	17	0	3	0	—				20	0
2015–16	Ergotelis	Football League	5	0	4	0	—				9	0
Total			79	2	8	0	—				87	2
2015–16	OFI	Gamma Ethniki	4	0	—						4	0
Total			4	0	—						4	0
Total	Club		283	4	21	0	—		6	0	310	4
