= Grigoris Athanasiou =

Greek footballer (born 1984)

Personal information
- Full name: Grigorios Athanasiou
- Date of birth: 9 March 1984 (age 42)
- Place of birth: Eleftherio-Kordelio, Greece
- Height: 1.96 m (6 ft 5 in)
- Position: Goalkeeper

Team information
- Current team: Pavlos Melas

Senior career*
Years	Team	Apps	(Gls)
2003–2004	Akratitos	1	(0)
2005–2007	Atsalenios	43	(0)
2007–2014	Ergotelis	74	(0)
2014–2015	Ayia Napa	9	(0)
2015–2016	Ergotelis	16	(0)
2016–2017	Chania		(0)
2017–2018	Panthiraikos		
2018-2020	Alexandros Kilkis		
2020–2023	Pavlos Melas		(3)
2023–2025	Kilkisiakos		(0)
2025–	Pavlos Melas		
- * Club domestic league appearances and goals as of 17 July 2017

Grigoris Athanasiou (Greek: Γρηγόρης Αθανασίου; born 9 March 1984) is a professional footballer who plays as a goalkeeper for A1 EPS Makedonias Group 1 club Pavlos Melas. He is left-handed.

== Career ==
Born in Eleftherio-Kordelio, Athanasiou began playing football with Akratitos in Super League Greece. He then moved to Crete and Gamma Ethniki side Atsalenios before signing with Super League club Ergotelis in 2007. He stayed with the club for seven seasons, gradually earning his place in the club's starting XI and playing as the starting goalkeeper in his final two seasons with the club. After the club informed Athanasiou of their intent to sign a top-class goalkeeper into their roster at the midst of the 2013−14 season (and signed a contract with Serbian goalkeeper Vladimir Stojković a few days later), Athanasiou decided not to renew his contract with the club and move to Cypriot club Ayia Napa. After one season in Cyprus, he returned to his former club Ergotelis, who had been relegated to the Football League the season before. After a very difficult season in which the club failed to pay players' wages for months and as a result withdrew from professional competitions on 19 January 2016, Athanasiou, who played his final match the day before, was released from his contract. He eventually signed with fellow Cretan Football League competitor Chania in the summer of 2016.

== Record ==
On 16 February 2022, Athanasiou scored a hat-trick with a trio of penalties in a Greek fourth division game between Aetos Vassilikon - Pavlos Melas FC (0–3), in Thessaloniki. He joined Jose Luis Chilavert and Ilija Pantelic on the list of the goalkeepers worldwide who scored a hat-trick.

== See also ==
- List of footballers who achieved hat-trick records
