= Manolis Tzanakakis =

Greek footballer (born 1992)

Personal information
- Full name: Emmanouil Tzanakakis
- Date of birth: 30 April 1992 (age 34)
- Place of birth: Tzermiado, Lasithi, Greece
- Height: 1.78 m (5 ft 10 in)
- Position: Right-back

Team information
- Current team: Ergotelis

Youth career
- –2011: Ergotelis

Senior career*
Years	Team	Apps	(Gls)
2011–2013	Ergotelis	46	(0)
2013–2016	Olympiacos	0	(0)
2013–2015	→ Ergotelis (loan)	51	(0)
2015–2016	→ Anorthosis (loan)	15	(1)
2016–2019	Aris	64	(2)
2020–2021	Panetolikos	29	(1)
2021–2022	Xanthi	22	(0)
2022–2023	Karmiotissa Pano Polemidion	18	(0)
2023	Ionikos	9	(0)
2024–2025	Kalamata	21	(0)
2025–2026	Chania	19	(1)
2026–	Ergotelis		

International career
2010	Greece U19	2	(0)
2012	Greece U21	4	(0)
- * Club domestic league appearances and goals as of 25 April 2026

Manolis Tzanakakis (Greek: Μανώλης Τζανακάκης; born 30 April 1992) is a Greek professional footballer who plays as a right-back for Gamma Ethniki club Ergotelis.

== Career ==
Tzanakakis started his football career at the infrastructure segments of Heraklion-based Super League side Ergotelis, and signed his first professional contract with the club on 29 November 2011. Despite the club being relegated at the end of the season, Tzanakakis impressed with his subsequent stellar performances in the Greek Football League, drawing the attention of Greek champions Olympiacos, who arranged for both his, as well as teammate Andreas Bouchalakis' transfer in March 2013. After celebrating promotion to the Super League at the end of the 2012–13 season with Ergotelis, Tzanakakis went on to sign a 4-year contract with Olympiacos in July 2013. He was immediately loaned out back to Ergotelis for another year, and once again in August 2014. In total, Tzanakakis amassed 100 caps with Ergotelis.

On 21 July 2015, Tzanakakis signed a one-year contract with Cypriot First Division side Anorthosis, again on loan from Olympiacos. He scored the first goal in his career on 27 April 2016, during a 1−1 championship draw vs. Apollon Limassol.

On 26 August 2016, Tzanakakis, released from his contract with Olympiacos, signed a two-year contract with Greek Football League club Aris.

On 29 December 2019, he signed a contract with Panetolikos, until the summer of 2021.

== Career statistics ==
=== Club ===
As of 29 July 2020

Club	Season	League			Cup		Continental		Total	
Club	Season	Division	Apps	Goals	Apps	Goals	Apps	Goals	Apps	Goals
Ergotelis	2011–12	Super League Greece	13	0	1	0	—		14	0
Ergotelis	2012–13	Super League Greece 2	33	0	1	0	—		34	0
Ergotelis	Total		46	0	2	0	—		48	0
Ergotelis (loan)	2013–14	Super League Greece	28	0	0	0	—		28	0
Ergotelis (loan)	2014–15	Super League Greece	23	0	1	0	—		24	0
Ergotelis (loan)	Total		51	0	1	0	—		52	0
Anorthosis (loan)	2015–16	Cypriot First Division	15	1	3	0	—		18	1
Anorthosis (loan)	Total		15	1	3	0	—		18	1
Aris	2016–17	Super League Greece 2	22	1	5	0	—		27	1
Aris	2017–18	Super League Greece 2	21	1	1	0	—		22	1
Aris	2018–19	Super League Greece	21	0	2	0	—		23	0
Aris	Total		64	2	8	0	—		72	2
Panetolikos	2019–20	Super League Greece	13	1	3	0	—		16	1
Career total			189	4	17	0	0	0	206	4
