= P.O. Atsaleniou =

Association football club in Greece

Atsalenios
- Full name: Παναθλητικός Όμιλος Ατσαλένιου; Panathlitikos Ómilos Atsaléniou (Pan-athletic Club of Atsalenio)
- Short name: POA
- Founded: 1951; 75 years ago
- Ground: Atsalenios Stadium
- Capacity: 1,500
- Chairman: George Lelekas
- Manager: Antonis Androulakis
- League: Gamma Ethniki
- 2025–26: Gamma Ethniki (Group 6), 8th
- Website: www.poatsaleniou.gr
Home colours	Away colours

P.O. Atsaleniou, short for Panathlitikos Omilos Atsaleniou (Greek: Παναθλητικός Όμιλος Ατσαλένιου, translated Pan-athletic Club of Atsalenio) and also known simply as Atsalenios or POA, is a Greek association football club based in the suburb Atsalenio of Heraklion, the largest city on the island of Crete. The club's short name Atsalenios can literally be translated made of steel (Greek: ατσάλι, being the Greek word for steel). The club currently competes in the Gamma Ethniki, the third tier of the Greek football league system.

== History ==
Atsalenios' older crest.

Atsalenios was founded in 1951 as the Pan-athletic Club of Atsalenio by Asia minor refugees occupying the Atsalenio suburb, located in the southern area of the city of Heraklion, Crete. Since 1960, the club hosts its home games at the Atsalenios Stadium, a privately owned football stadium with a capacity of 1,500 spectators.

In 1964, the club competed in the Beta Ethniki, the second tier of the Greek football league system for the first time in its history. Since 1976, Atsalenios has consecutively competed at national competitions, either as an amateur or professional club playing in the Delta Ethniki, the fourth tier of the Greek football league system. In 2003, Atsalenios was promoted to the Gamma Ethniki, featuring in seven consecutive seasons before being relegated in 2010. The club has since briefly resurfaced in the 2013–14 Gamma Ethniki, where it was relegated to Heraklion FCA regional competitions for the first time in 38 years, after finishing 8th in the Gamma Ethniki Group 5. Then it once again achieved promotion to the Gamma Ethniki during the 2015−16 season, when the club was crowned champions of Heraklion by finishing first in the regional league, and eventually placing first in the 2016 FCA Winners' Championship.

Atsalenios currently holds the record for most Heraklion FCA Cup trophies won since the competition was established in 1971, with a total of 12 wins. The club has also claimed 9 Heraklion FCA Championships, second-most behind modern Super League regulars OFI.

Atsalenios maintains its own football academies, having produced a number of players that have since moved on to more prestigious clubs in Heraklion, such as OFI and Ergotelis, as well as other Greek Super League clubs. Some of the most renowned players to emerge from Atsalenios' infrastructure segments include Michalis Sifakis (former Greek champion with Olympiacos, 15 international caps with Greece), his father Myron (1986−87 Cup winner with OFI), Manolis Roubakis, Petros Giakoumakis and others.

== Honours ==
=== Domestic ===
- Delta Ethniki
  - Winners (2): 2002−03, 2012−13
- Greek FCA Winners' Championship
  - Winners (2): 1988, 2016

=== Regional ===
- Heraklion FCA Championship
  - Winners (11): 1962–63, 1965–66, 1970–71, 1973–74, 1977–78, 1984–85, 1987–88, 1994–95, 1996–97, 2015–16, 2022–23
- Heraklion FCA Cup
  - Winners (12) (record): 1974−75, 1977−78, 1983−84, 1985−86, 1986−87, 1990−91, 1996−97, 1997−98, 2000−01, 2002−03, 2014−15, 2018–19
- Heraklion FCA Super Cup
  - Winners (4): 2015, 2016, 2019, 2023

== Notable former players ==
Greece

- (Greece) Michalis Sifakis
- (Greece) Manolis Roubakis
- (Greece) Michail Fragoulakis
- (Greece) Petros Giakoumakis
- (Greece) Giorgos Giakoumakis
- (Greece) Grigorios Athanasiou
- (Greece) Dimitris Hasomeris
- (Greece) Dimitris Karademitros
- (Greece) Stefanos Vavoulas
- (Greece) Thanasis Patiniotis
- (Greece) Anestis Anastasiadis

Europe

- (Portugal) Miguel Oliveira
- (Portugal) Marco Meireles

Africa

- (Nigeria) Ebus Onuchukwu
- (Nigeria) Rasheed Alabi
- (Cameroon) Edouard Oum Ndeki

America

- (Argentina) Fernando Benitez
- (Argentina) Abel Masuero

== Managerial history ==
- (Croatia) Rajko Janjanin (1996–2002)
- (Greece) Pavlos Dermitzakis (2002–2007)
- (Greece) Ioannis Taousianis (2007–2008)
- (Greece) Thanasis Kolitsidakis (2008–2009)
- (Greece) Manolis Patemtzis (2009–2015)
- (Greece) Vasilis Krasanakis (2015–2017 )
- (Greece) Manolis Soutzis (2017–2018 )
- (Greece) Manolis Skyvalos (2018–2020 )
- (Greece) Antonis Androulakis (2020–2021)
- (Greece) Anestis Anastasiadis (2021–2022)
