= 2010–11 Ergotelis F.C. season =

Ergotelis
2010–11 season
- Chairman: Apostolos Papoutsakis
- Manager: Nikos Karageorgiou
- Stadium: Pankritio Stadium, Heraklion
- Super League Greece: 8th
- Greek Cup: Fourth Round
- Top goalscorer: League: Mario Budimir (6); Sergio Leal (6); All: Mario Budimir (6); Sergio Leal (6)
Home colours	Away colours	Third colours

The 2010–11 season was Ergotelis' 81st season in existence, 6th season in the Super League Greece, and the fifth consecutive since the club's latest promotion from the Football League. Ergotelis also participated in the Greek cup, entering the competition in the Fourth Round. The club managed to finish in 8th place at the end of the season, which at the time, was the best the club had achieved in its history in the Super League.

== Players ==
No.	Name	Nationality	Position (s)	Date of birth (age)	Signed from	Notes
Goalkeepers
1	Iosif Daskalakis	(Greece)	GK	7 August 1982 (29)	(Greece) OFI	
40	Zacharias Kavousakis	(Greece)	GK	11 January 1989 (22)	Youth System	
84	Grigorios Athanasiou	(Greece)	GK	9 March 1984 (27)	(Greece) P.O. Atsalenios	
Defenders
4	Georgios Alexopoulos	(Greece)	CB	7 February 1977 (34)	(Greece) AEK Athens	
5	Mario Hieblinger	(Austria)	CB	5 July 1977 (34)	(Austria) Grazer AK	
6	Tomasz Wisio	(Poland)	CB	20 January 1982 (29)	(Austria) LASK Linz	
55	Manolis Kandilakis	(Greece)	CB	4 April 1990 (21)	Youth System	
89	Georgios Sarris	(Greece)	CB	8 September 1989 (22)	Youth System	
7	Manolis Roubakis	(Greece)	RB	6 January 1979 (32)	(Greece) OFI	
27	Lefteris Gialousis	(Greece)	RB	18 July 1985 (26)	(Greece) Irodotos	
37	Giorgi Shashiashvili	(Georgia (country))	RB	1 September 1979 (32)	(Austria) Sturm Graz	
Midfielders
15	Silva Júnior	(Brazil)	DM	24 September 1976 (35)	(Portugal) Paços Ferreira	
23	Egutu Oliseh	(Nigeria) (France)	DM	18 November 1980 (31)	(Greece) Panthrakikos	On loan
11	Beto	(Brazil) (Portugal)	CM	20 November 1976 (35)	(Switzerland) Sion	
12	Dimitrios Orfanos	(Greece)	CM	2 November 1982 (29)	(Greece) PAOK	
30	Ilias Kyriakidis	(Greece)	CM	5 August 1985 (26)	(Greece) AEL	Winter Transfer Window
8	Diego Romano	(Argentina)	AM	11 March 1980 (31)	(Argentina) San Martín de Tucumán	
17	Angelos Chanti	(Greece)	AM	7 September 1989 (22)	(Greece) Olympiakos Chersonissos	
24	Christos Chrysofakis	(Greece)	AM	18 January 1990 (21)	Youth System	
31	Michail Fragoulakis	(Greece)	AM	15 July 1983 (28)	(Greece) P.O. Atsalenios	
Forwards
14	Nikolaos Karelis	(Greece)	LW	24 February 1992 (19)	Youth System	
10	Sergio Leal	(Uruguay)	RW	25 September 1982 (29)	(Uruguay) Danubio	
9	Māris Verpakovskis	(Latvia)	CF	15 October 1979 (32)	(Ukraine) Dynamo Kyiv	On loan
25	Mario Budimir	(Croatia)	CF	12 February 1986 (25)	(Croatia) Hajduk Split	

=== The following players have departed in mid-season ===
18	Mateo Bertoša	(Croatia)	LB	10 August 1988 (23)	(Croatia) Jadran Poreč	Released
20	Georgios Siakkas	(Greece)	DM	23 March 1988 (23)	(Greece) Panserraikos	Loaned out

=== Out of team ===
Note: Flags indicate national team as has been defined under FIFA eligibility rules. Players and Managers may hold more than one non-FIFA nationality.

Head coach	Captain	Kit manufacturer	Shirt sponsor
(Greece) Nikos Karageorgiou	(Brazil) Silva Júnior	Lotto	Lotto

== Transfers ==
=== In ===
Squad #	Position	Transfer Window	Player	Transferred From	Fee	Date
23	MF	(Nigeria) (France) Egutu Oliseh	Summer	(Greece) Panthrakikos	Loan	22 June 2010
99	FW	(Nigeria) Patrick Ogunsoto	Summer	(Greece) OFI	Loan return	1 July 2010
N/A	MF	(Greece) Ioannis Kiliaras	Summer	(Greece) Trikala	Loan return	1 July 2010
17	MF	(Greece) Angelos Chanti	Summer	(Greece) Olympiakos Chersonissos	▼€25,000	2 July 2010
4	DF	(Greece) Georgios Alexopoulos	Summer	(Greece) AEK Athens	Free	16 July 2010
30	MF	(Greece) Ilias Kyriakidis	Winter	(Greece) AEL	Free	2 January 2011

=== Promoted from youth system ===
Squad #	Position	Player	Date	Signed Until
55	DF	(Greece) Manolis Kandilakis	12 August 2010	30 June 2015

Total spending: ▼€25,000

=== Out ===
Position	Player	Transfer Window	Transferred To	Fee	Date
MF	(Lithuania) Deividas Česnauskis	Summer	(Greece) Aris	Free	3 May 2010
MF	(Greece) Sotiris Balafas	Summer	(Greece) PAOK	Loan return	11 May 2010
MF	(Greece) Dimitrios Kiliaras	Summer	(Greece) Panionios	Loan return	11 May 2010
DF	(Greece) Dimitrios Geladaris	Summer	(Greece) Doxa Drama	Free	11 May 2010
DF	(Greece) Panagiotis Kordonouris	Summer	(Greece) Panachaiki	Free	14 May 2010
GK	(Hungary) Zsolt Posza	Summer	(Cyprus) Doxa Katokopias	Free	2 June 2010
DF	(Greece) Georgios Seliniotakis	Summer	(Greece) Giouchtas	Loan	2 August 2010
FW	(Nigeria) Patrick Ogunsoto	Summer	Free agent	Released	10 August 2010
DF	(Greece) Ioannis Kiliaras	Summer	(Greece) Panachaiki	Free	13 August 2010
DF	(Croatia) Mateo Bertoša	Winter	(Bosnia and Herzegovina) Široki Brijeg	Free	29 January 2011
DF	(Greece) Georgios Siakkas	Winter	(Greece) Doxa Drama	Loan	31 January 2011

Total income: ▲€0,000

Expenditure: ▼€25,000

== Pre-season and friendlies ==
=== Pre-season friendlies ===
Win Draw Loss

23 July 2010 Friendly	Ergotelis (Greece)	3–0	(Greece) Chania	Heraklion, Crete, Greece
18:45	Leal 42'; Chrysofakis 62'; Fragoulakis 80'			Stadium: Pankritio Stadium, Training Ground

25 July 2010 Friendly	Olympiacos (Greece)	0–0	(Greece) Ergotelis	Agios Ioannis Rentis, Pireus, Greece
19:00				Stadium: Renti Training Centre

27 July 2010 Friendly	Ergotelis (Greece)	1–1	(Netherlands) Cambuur	Garderen, Gelderland, Netherlands
19:00	Fragoulakis 6'		Reza 75'	Stadium: Garderen Training Centre

31 July 2010 Friendly	N.E.C. (Netherlands)	0–2	(Greece) Ergotelis	Nijmegen, Netherlands
14:30			Verpakovskis 55'; Karelis 56'	Stadium: Goffertstadion

3 August 2010 Friendly	Ergotelis	2–0	Skoda Xanthi	Garderen
19:00	Karelis 18'; Alexopoulos 40'			Stadium: Garderen Training Centre

6 August 2010 Friendly	FC Eindhoven (Netherlands)	1–1	(Greece) Ergotelis	Eindhoven, Netherlands
18:00	Vansimpsen 21'		Hieblinger 58'	Stadium: Jan Louwers Stadion

9 August 2010 Friendly	Ergotelis (Greece)	2–0	Yemen	Garderen, Gelderland, Netherlands
19:00	Budimir 53'; Leal 66'			Stadium: Garderen Training Centre

14 August 2010 Friendly	Ergotelis (Greece)	0–0	(Greece) OFI	Heraklion, Crete, Greece
20:00				Stadium: Pankritio Stadium

22 August 2010 Friendly	Ergotelis (Greece)	1–1	(Greece) Platanias	Heraklion, Crete, Greece
18:15	Roubakis 68'		Kitsas 1'	Stadium: Pankritio Stadium, Training Ground

=== Mid-season friendlies ===
Win Draw Loss

5 September 2010 Friendly	Ergotelis (Greece)	3–0	(Greece) Olympiakos Chersonissos	Heraklion, Crete, Greece
18:30	Orfanos 52', 65'; Raptakis 58' (o.g.)			Stadium: Pankritio Stadium, Training Ground

28 February 2011 Friendly	Ergotelis (Greece)	1–1	(United States) Philadelphia Union	Heraklion, Crete, Greece
16:00	Karelis 89' (pen.)		Ruiz 26'	Stadium: Pankritio Stadium

=== Post-season friendlies ===
Win Draw Loss

4 May 2011 Friendly	Ergotelis (Greece)	4–1	(Greece) Rouvas	Heraklion, Crete, Greece
17:30	Budimir 23', 43'; Leal 27'; Chalkiadakis 68'		Ximerakis 85' (pen.)	Stadium: Pankritio Stadium

11 May 2011 Friendly	Chania (Greece)	1–2	(Greece) Ergotelis	Chania, Crete, Greece
17:30	Goniotakis 21' (pen.)		Chalkiadakis 18'; Gialousis 74'	Stadium: Perivolia Municipal Stadium

17 May 2011 Friendly	Platanias (Greece)	2–2	(Greece) Ergotelis	Chania, Crete, Greece
17:30	Provatidis 59'; Mirčeta 83'		Domatas 25'; Sarris 42' (pen.)	Stadium: Perivolia Municipal Stadium

== Competitions ==
=== Overview ===
Competition	Started round	Current position / round	Final position / round	First match	Last match
Super League Greece	1	8th	8th	29 August	17 April
Greek Football Cup	Fourth Round	Fourth Round	Fourth Round	27 October	27 October

Last updated: 5 August 2014

== Super League Greece ==
=== League table ===
Pos	Team	Pld	W	D	L	GF	GA	GD	Pts	Qualification or relegation
6	Aris	30	13	6	11	29	29	0	45	
7	Kavala (Note: On 28 July 2011, the Disciplinary Committee of the competition found Olympiacos Volos and Kavala guilty of match-fixing. Therefore the clubs were automatically put at the end of the league table and demoted to the Football League. The decision, however, was lifted on 10 August 2011 after both appealed. Instead of that Olympiacos Volos had 10 points deducted and Kavala 8 for the 2011-2012 season. On 23 August 2011, the Professional Sports Committee stripped Kavala and Olympiacos Volos of their professional licence, due to their chairmen's involvement in the match fixing scandal.) (D)	30	10	10	10	29	27	+2	40	Relegation to the Delta Ethniki
8	Ergotelis	30	11	6	13	32	38	−6	39	
9	Skoda Xanthi	30	9	9	12	29	35	−6	36	
10	Panionios	30	8	11	11	25	35	−10	35	

Source: Super League Greece
Rules for classification: 1) Points; 2) Head-to-head points; 3) Head-to-head goal difference; 4) Play-offs (neutral ground); 7) Draw.
(Note: Criterion 4 is only used if needed to decide champion, teams for relegation or teams for UEFA competitions).
(D) Disqualified

=== Results summary ===
Overall								Home						Away					
Pld	W	D	L	GF	GA	GD	Pts	W	D	L	GF	GA	GD	W	D	L	GF	GA	GD
30	11	6	13	32	38	−6	39	7	3	5	18	15	+3	4	3	8	14	23	−9

Last updated: 31 July 2014.
Source: Competitive matches

=== Matches ===
Win Draw Loss

29 August 2010 1	Ergotelis	0–1	Asteras Tripolis	Heraklion, Crete, Greece
18:15			Ladakis 4'	Stadium: Pankritio Stadium; Attendance: 820; Referee: Christos Mitsios

12 September 2010 2	Olympiacos Volos	0–1	Ergotelis	Volos, Greece
16:00			Budimir 68'	Stadium: Panthessaliko Stadium; Attendance: 2,450; Referee: Dimitrios Kalopoulos

18 September 2010 3	Ergotelis	1–0	Skoda Xanthi	Heraklion
17:15	Romano 63'			Stadium: Pankritio Stadium; Attendance: 1,465; Referee: Ilias Spathas

26 September 2010 4	Aris	1–0	Ergotelis	Thessaloniki, Greece
18:15	Cesarec 90+2'			Stadium: Kleanthis Vikelidis Stadium; Attendance: 9,347; Referee: Athanasios Giachos

3 October 2010 5	Ergotelis	1–4	Panathinaikos	Heraklion, Crete, Greece
18:15	Budimir 55'		Spyropoulos 35'; Cissé 39', 44'; Katsouranis 78'	Stadium: Pankritio Stadium; Attendance: 6,209; Referee: Dimitrios Kalopoulos

16 October 2010 6	Panionios	0–1	Ergotelis	Nea Smyrni, Athens, Greece
17:15			Leal 40'	Stadium: Nea Smyrni Stadium; Attendance: 2,548; Referee: Andreas Pappas

24 October 2010 7	Kavala	3–1	Ergotelis	Kavala, Greece
16:00	Shashiashvili 28' (o.g.); Darcheville 53'; Onwuachi 64'		Leal 89'	Stadium: Anthi Karagianni Stadium; Attendance: 1,568; Referee: Marios Lambropoulos

31 October 2010 8	Ergotelis	1–2	PAOK	Heraklion, Crete, Greece
17:15	Budimir 16'		Salpingidis 35'; Contreras 90+4'	Stadium: Pankritio Stadium; Attendance: 1,273; Referee: Stavros Mantalos

8 November 2010 9	AEK Athens	3–1	Ergotelis	Athens, Greece
19:30	Kafes 44'; Blanco 55'; Éder 90+3'		Fragoulakis 33'	Stadium: OAKA; Attendance: 6,712; Referee: Christos Mitsios

13 November 2010 10 (First Half)	Ergotelis	0–0	Olympiacos	Heraklion, Crete, Greece
17:15				Stadium: Pankritio Stadium; Attendance: 5,302; Referee: Athanasios Giachos

21 November 2010 11	Atromitos	1–1	Ergotelis	Peristeri, Athens, Greece
15:00	Saganowski 6'		Leal 65'	Stadium: Peristeri Stadium; Attendance: 2,479; Referee: Stavros Tritsonis

24 November 2010 10 (Second Half)	Ergotelis	0–2	Olympiacos	Heraklion, Crete, Greece
17:15			Pantelić 78'; Fuster 90+5'	Stadium: Pankritio Stadium; Attendance: 2,755; Referee: Athanasios Giachos

27 November 2010 12	Ergotelis	2–1	AEL	Heraklion, Crete, Greece
17:15	Romano 9'; Leal 27' (pen.)		Canobbio 18'	Stadium: Pankritio Stadium; Attendance: 563; Referee: Georgios Stathopoulos

4 December 2010 13	Iraklis	1–1	Ergotelis	Thessaloniki, Greece
17:15	Lima 52'		Romano 39'	Stadium: Kaftanzoglio Stadium; Attendance: 3,902; Referee: Stavros Tritsonis

12 December 2010 14	Ergotelis	3–0	Kerkyra	Heraklion, Crete, Greece
15:00	Oliseh 6'; Verpakovskis 52'; Budimir 73'			Stadium: Pankritio Stadium; Attendance: 590; Referee: Praxitelis Zachariadis

18 December 2010 15	Ergotelis	2–0	Panserraikos	Heraklion, Crete, Greece
17:15	Budimir 17'; Wisio 85'			Stadium: Pankritio Stadium; Attendance: 852; Referee: Dimitrios Kyrkos

5 January 2011 16	Asteras Tripolis	3–0	Ergotelis	Tripoli, Greece
15:00	Udoji 16'; Francou 55', 72'			Stadium: Theodoros Kolokotronis Stadium; Attendance: 1,556; Referee: Apostolos Ambarkiolis

9 January 2011 17	Ergotelis	0–0	Olympiacos Volos	Heraklion, Crete, Greece
15:00				Stadium: Pankritio Stadium; Attendance: 1,035; Referee: Vasilios Pamporidis

16 January 2011 18	Skoda Xanthi	0–1	Ergotelis	Xanthi
19:30			Romano 32'	Stadium: Skoda Xanthi Arena; Attendance: 1,655; Referee: Petros Konstantineas

23 January 2011 19	Ergotelis	0–0	Aris	Heraklion, Crete, Greece
17:25				Stadium: Pankritio Stadium; Attendance: 1,650; Referee: Michalis Tsiniaris

29 January 2011 20	Panathinaikos	2–0	Ergotelis	Athens, Greece
19:30	Gilberto 7'; Kanté 39'			Stadium: OAKA; Attendance: 7,316; Referee: Dimitrios Thanos

6 February 2011 21	Ergotelis	2–0	Panionios	Heraklion, Crete, Greece
15:00	Shashiashvili 6'; Júnior 47'			Stadium: Pankritio Stadium; Attendance: 1,210; Referee: Ilias Spathas

12 February 2011 22	Ergotelis	2–1	Kavala	Heraklion, Crete, Greece
17:15	Beto 44'; Leal 72' (pen.)		Onwuachi 21'	Stadium: Pankritio Stadium; Attendance: 2,123; Referee: Dimitrios Thanos

27 February 2011 23	Ergotelis	2–3	AEK Athens	Heraklion, Crete, Greece
17:15	Leal 60' (pen.); Fragoulakis 90+8'		Blanco 36'; Burns 49'; Georgeas 90+4'	Stadium: Pankritio Stadium; Attendance: 2,921; Referee: Petros Konstantineas

6 March 2011 24	Olympiacos	3–0	Ergotelis	Pireus, Greece
15:00	Modesto 47'; Pantelić 58'; Mirallas 65'			Stadium: Georgios Karaiskakis Stadium; Attendance: Behind closed doors Referee: Christos Mitsios

9 March 2011 25	PAOK	2–0	Ergotelis	Thessaloniki, Greece
17:15	Contreras 17'; Tsoukalas 86'			Stadium: Toumba Stadium; Attendance: 7,069; Referee: Marios Lambropoulos

13 March 2011 26	Ergotelis	1–1	Atromitos	Heraklion, Crete, Greece
15:00	Romano 44'		Anastasakos 68'	Stadium: Pankritio Stadium; Attendance: 1,225; Referee: Georgios Stathopoulos

20 March 2011 27	AEL	3–3	Ergotelis	Larissa, Greece
19:00	Abubakari 13'; Tshibamba 47'; Cousin 80'		Verpakovskis 23', 90+1'; Hieblinger 51'	Stadium: AEL FC Arena; Attendance: 4,155; Referee: Michalis Tsiniaris

3 April 2011 28	Ergotelis	1–0	Iraklis	Heraklion, Crete, Greece
19:00	Hieblinger 33'			Stadium: Pankritio Stadium; Attendance: 1,244; Referee: Anastasios Kakos

10 April 2011 29	Kerkyra	1–0	Ergotelis	Kerkyra, Greece
19:00	Kalantzis 29'			Stadium: Kerkyra Stadium; Attendance: 1,334; Referee: Anastasios Sidiropoulos

17 April 2011 30	Panserraikos	0–4	Ergotelis	Serres, Greece
19:00			Verpakovskis 5'; Orfanos 31'; Budimir 73'; Karelis 85' (pen.)	Stadium: Serres Municipal Stadium; Attendance: 604; Referee: Dimitrios Thanos

== Greek Cup ==
=== Fourth round ===
==== Matches ====
Win Draw Loss

27 October 2010 Knockout match	PAS Giannina	1–0	Ergotelis	Ioannina, Greece
15:00	Bakayoko 45'			Stadium: Zosimades Stadium; Attendance: N/A; Referee: Anastasios Kakos

== Statistics ==
=== Goal scorers ===
No.	Pos.	Nation	Name	Super League Greece	Greek Cup	Total
25	FW	(Croatia)	Mario Budimir	6	0	6
10	FW	(Uruguay)	Sergio Leal	6	0	6
8	MF	(Argentina)	Diego Romano	5	0	5
9	FW	(Latvia)	Māris Verpakovskis	4	0	4
31	MF	(Greece)	Michail Fragoulakis	2	0	2
5	DF	(Austria)	Mario Hieblinger	2	0	2
14	FW	(Greece)	Nikolaos Karelis	1	0	1
23	MF	(Nigeria) (France)	Egutu Oliseh	1	0	1
15	MF	(Brazil)	Silva Júnior	1	0	1
6	DF	(Poland)	Tomasz Wisio	1	0	1
37	DF	(Georgia (country))	Giorgi Shashiashvili	1	0	1
11	MF	(Brazil) (Portugal)	Beto	1	0	1
12	MF	(Greece)	Dimitrios Orfanos	1	0	1
-	-	-	Opponent's own Goals	0	0	0
TOTAL				32	0	32

Last updated: 15 August 2014
