= 2009–10 Ergotelis F.C. season =

Ergotelis
2009–10 season
- Chairman: Apostolos Papoutsakis
- Manager: Nikos Karageorgiou
- Stadium: Pankritio Stadium, Heraklion
- Super League Greece: 11th
- Greek Cup: Fourth Round
- Top goalscorer: League: Sergio Leal (7); All: Sergio Leal (8)
Home colours	Away colours	Third colours

The 2009–10 season was Ergotelis' 80th season in existence, 5th season in the Super League Greece, and the fourth consecutive since the club's latest promotion from the Football League. Ergotelis also participated in the Greek cup, entering the competition in the Fourth Round. The club ultimately managed to finish in 11th place, despite a notable fifth-place position at the end of the championship First Round. During this season the club celebrated its 80th anniversary, culminating relevant festivities in style, by thrashing Super League champions Olympiacos in a memorable friendly match with a 5–0 victory.

== Players ==
No.	Name	Nationality	Position (s)	Date of birth (age)	Signed from	Notes
Goalkeepers
1	Iosif Daskalakis	(Greece)	GK	7 August 1982 (28)	(Greece) OFI	
30	Zsolt Posza	(Hungary)	GK	11 May 1977 (33)	(Hungary) Vasas	
40	Zacharias Kavousakis	(Greece)	GK	11 January 1989 (21)	Youth System	
84	Grigorios Athanasiou	(Greece)	GK	9 March 1984 (26)	(Greece) P.O. Atsalenios	
Defenders
4	Tomasz Wisio	(Poland)	CB	20 January 1982 (28)	(Austria) LASK Linz	Anterior cruciate ligament injury (injured) Source
5	Mario Hieblinger	(Austria)	CB	5 July 1977 (33)	(Austria) Grazer AK	
6	Panagiotis Kordonouris	(Greece)	CB	8 November 1975 (35)	(Greece) Skoda Xanthi	
13	Georgios Seliniotakis	(Greece)	CB	N/A	Youth System	
89	Georgios Sarris	(Greece)	CB	8 September 1989 (21)	Youth System	
3	Dimitrios Geladaris	(Greece)	LB	6 November 1974 (36)	(Greece) Atromitos	
18	Mateo Bertoša	(Croatia)	LB	10 August 1988 (22)	(Croatia) Jadran Poreč	
7	Manolis Roubakis	(Greece)	RB	6 January 1979 (31)	(Greece) OFI	
27	Lefteris Gialousis	(Greece)	RB	18 July 1985 (25)	(Greece) Irodotos	
37	Giorgi Shashiashvili	(Georgia (country))	RB	1 September 1979 (31)	(Austria) Sturm Graz	
Midfielders
15	Silva Júnior	(Brazil)	DM	24 September 1976 (34)	(Portugal) Paços Ferreira	
19	Sotiris Balafas	(Greece)	DM	19 August 1986 (24)	(Greece) PAOK	On loan, Winter Transfer Window
20	Georgios Siakkas	(Greece)	DM	23 March 1988 (22)	(Greece) Panserraikos	
11	Beto	(Brazil) (Portugal)	CM	20 November 1976 (34)	(Switzerland) Sion	
12	Dimitrios Orfanos	(Greece)	CM	2 November 1982 (28)	(Greece) PAOK	
8	Diego Romano	(Argentina)	AM	11 March 1980 (30)	(Argentina) San Martín de Tucumán	
23	Dimitrios Kiliaras	(Greece)	AM	23 March 1986 (24)	(Greece) Panionios	On loan
24	Christos Chrysofakis	(Greece)	AM	18 January 1990 (20)	Youth System	
31	Michail Fragoulakis	(Greece)	AM	15 July 1983 (27)	(Greece) P.O. Atsalenios	
Forwards
14	Nikolaos Karelis	(Greece)	LW	24 February 1992 (18)	Youth System	
10	Sergio Leal	(Uruguay)	RW	25 September 1982 (28)	(Uruguay) Danubio	
33	Deividas Česnauskis	(Lithuania)	RW	30 June 1981 (age 29)	(Scotland) Hearts	
9	Māris Verpakovskis	(Latvia)	CF	15 October 1979 (31)	(Ukraine) Dynamo Kyiv	On loan
25	Mario Budimir	(Croatia)	CF	12 February 1986 (24)	(Croatia) Hajduk Split	

=== The following players have departed in mid-season ===
99	Patrick Ogunsoto	(Nigeria)	CF	19 April 1983 (27)	(Belgium) Westerlo	Loaned out
21	Ioannis Kiliaras	(Greece)	LB / LM	9 June 1988 (22)	Youth System	Loaned out

=== Out of team ===
Note: Flags indicate national team as has been defined under FIFA eligibility rules. Players and Managers may hold more than one non-FIFA nationality.

Head coach	Captain	Kit manufacturer	Shirt sponsor
(Greece) Nikos Karageorgiou	(Brazil) Silva Júnior	Lotto	Lotto

== Transfers ==
=== In ===
Squad #	Position	Transfer Window	Player	Transferred From	Fee	Date
20	MF	(Greece) Georgios Siakkas	Summer	(Greece) Panserraikos	▼€200,000	5 May 2009
27	DF	(Georgia (country)) Giorgi Shashiashvili	Summer	(Austria) Sturm Graz	Free	2 June 2009
4	DF	(Poland) Tomasz Wisio	Summer	(Austria) LASK Linz	Free	2 June 2009
33	FW	(Lithuania) Deividas Česnauskis	Summer	(Scotland) Hearts	Free	10 June 2009
18	DF	(Croatia) Mateo Bertoša	Summer	(Croatia) Jadran Poreč	Free	26 June 2009
7	MF	(Greece) Manolis Roubakis	Summer	(Greece) OFI	Free	1 July 2009
9	FW	(Latvia) Māris Verpakovskis	Summer	(Ukraine) Dynamo Kyiv	Loan	5 July 2009
23	MF	(Greece) Dimitrios Kiliaras	Summer	(Greece) Panionios	Loan	13 July 2009
10	FW	(Uruguay) Sergio Leal	Summer	(Uruguay) Danubio	▼€300,000	21 July 2009
19	MF	(Greece) Sotiris Balafas	Winter	(Greece) PAOK	Loan	14 January 2010

=== Promoted from youth system ===
Total spending: ▼€500,000

=== Out ===
Position	Player	Transfer Window	Transferred To	Fee	Date
MF	(Guinea-Bissau) (Portugal) Daniel Kenedy	Summer	(Greece) Aias Salamina	Free	7 May 2009
DF	(Austria) Gernot Plassnegger	Summer	(Austria) Admira Wacker	Free	11 May 2009
FW	(Greece) Vasilios Koutsianikoulis	Summer	(Greece) PAOK	▲€1,800,000	26 May 2009
DF	(Greece) Labros Kefaloukos	Summer	(Greece) Ionikos	Free	29 June 2009
DF	(Greece) Charis Mattheakis	Summer	(Greece) P.O. Atsalenios	Free	29 June 2009
MF	(Brazil) Rogério Martins	Summer	(Greece) Asteras Tripolis	Loan return	1 July 2009
FW	(Greece) Georgios Vakouftsis	Summer	(Greece) Skoda Xanthi	Free	7 July 2009
DF	(Brazil) Maurício Fernandes	Summer	(Brazil) Feirense	Free	21 July 2009
FW	(Nigeria) Patrick Ogunsoto	Winter	(Greece) OFI	Loan	4 January 2010
MF	(Greece) Ioannis Kiliaras	Winter	(Greece) Trikala	Loan	11 January 2010

Total income: ▲€1,800,000

Expenditure: ▲€1,300,000

== Pre-season and friendlies ==
=== Pre-season friendlies ===
Win Draw Loss

19 July 2009 Friendly	Ergotelis (Greece)	0 – 0	(Romania) Rapid București	Hoenderloo, Apeldoorn, Gelderland, Netherlands
18:00				Stadium: Hoenderloo, Training Centre

23 July 2009 Friendly	Ergotelis (Greece)	1 – 2	(Turkey) Gaziantepspor	Hoenderloo, Apeldoorn, Gelderland, Netherlands
18:00	Sarris 87' (pen.)		Tütünci 19', 42'	Stadium: Hoenderloo, Training Centre

26 July 2009 Friendly	Ergotelis (Greece)	1 – 0	(Turkey) Kasımpaşa	Hoenderloo, Apeldoorn, Gelderland, Netherlands
18:00	Júnior 19'			Stadium: Hoenderloo, Training Centre

28 July 2009 Friendly	Ergotelis (Greece)	0 – 0	(Bulgaria) Lokomotiv Sofia	Hoenderloo, Apeldoorn, Gelderland, Netherlands
16:30				Stadium: Hoenderloo, Training Centre

31 July 2009 Friendly	Veendam (Netherlands)	1 – 0	(Greece) Ergotelis	Veendam, Netherlands
19:30	Kolder 25'			Stadium: De Langeleegte

9 August 2009 Friendly	Kavala (Greece)	3 – 2	(Greece) Ergotelis	Kavala, Greece
20:30	Dobrašinović 8', 58'; Soultanidis 24'		Budimir 44'; Beto 52'	Stadium: Anthi Karagianni Stadium

12 August 2009 Friendly	PAOK (Greece)	1 – 0	(Greece) Ergotelis	Thessaloniki, Greece
21:45	Sorlin 90'			Stadium: Toumba Stadium

16 August 2009 Friendly	Ergotelis (Greece)	0 – 2	(Greece) Platanias	Heraklion, Crete, Greece
19:00			Seliniotakis 10' (o.g.); Paligiorgos 82'	Stadium: Pankritio Stadium, Training Ground

=== Mid-season friendlies ===
Win Draw Loss

23 August 2009 Friendly	Ergotelis (Greece)	1 – 0	(Greece) Irodotos	Heraklion, Crete, Greece
17:30	Kordonouris 16'			Stadium: Pankritio Stadium, Training Ground

6 September 2009 Friendly	Ergotelis (Greece)	5 – 0	(Greece) Olympiacos	Heraklion, Crete, Greece
19:00	Fragoulakis 3'; Leal 45'; Beto 52'; Budimir 63'; Karelis 90'			Stadium: Pankritio Stadium

23 February 2010 Friendly	Chania (Greece)	0 – 2	(Greece) Ergotelis	Chania, Crete, Greece
17:30			Orfanos 7'; Roubakis 69'	Stadium: Perivolia Municipal Stadium

=== Post-season friendlies ===
Win Draw Loss

27 April 2010 Friendly	Ergotelis (Greece)	4 – 0	(Greece) Olympiakos Chersonissos	Heraklion, Crete, Greece
17:30	Leal 40'; Verpakovskis 62' (pen.); Budimir 75', 78'			Stadium: Pankritio Stadium

13 May 2010 Friendly	Ergotelis (Greece)	2 – 2	(Greece) Giouchtas	Heraklion, Crete, Greece
18:00	Leal 37'; Budimir 71'		Tsafantakis 13', 20'	Stadium: Pankritio Stadium, Training Ground

22 May 2010 Friendly	Chania (Greece)	3 – 3	(Greece) Ergotelis	Chania, Crete, Greece
17:00	Goniotakis 37'; Seliniotakis 43'; Oglü 74'		Karelis 4', 21'; Koulakis 61' (o.g.)	Stadium: Perivolia Municipal Stadium

== Competitions ==
=== Overview ===
Competition	Started round	Current position / round	Final position / round	First match	Last match
Super League Greece	1	11th	11th	22 August	18 April
Greek Football Cup	Fourth Round	Fourth Round	Fourth Round	28 October	28 October

Last updated: 5 August 2014

== Super League Greece ==
=== League table ===
Pos	Team	Pld	W	D	L	GF	GA	GD	Pts
9	Panionios	30	9	10	11	34	35	−1	37 (Note: Head-to-head points: Larissa 7, Panionios 5, Iraklis 4.)
10	Iraklis	30	10	7	13	39	41	−2	37
11	Ergotelis	30	9	9	12	37	41	−4	36 (Note: Head-to-head points: Ergotelis 6, Asteras Tripolis 0.)
12	Asteras Tripolis	30	10	6	14	29	36	−7	36
13	Skoda Xanthi	30	10	5	15	27	36	−9	35

Source: Super League Greece
Rules for classification: 1) Points; 2) Head-to-head points; 3) Head-to-head goal difference; 4) Play-offs (neutral ground).
(Note: Criterion 4 is only used if needed to decide champion, teams for relegation or teams for UEFA competitions).

=== Results summary ===
Overall								Home						Away					
Pld	W	D	L	GF	GA	GD	Pts	W	D	L	GF	GA	GD	W	D	L	GF	GA	GD
30	9	9	12	37	41	−4	36	6	6	3	19	16	+3	3	3	9	18	25	−7

Last updated: 31 July 2014.
Source: Competitive matches

=== Matches ===
Win Draw Loss

22 August 2009 1	Ergotelis	0 – 3	Panathinaikos	Heraklion, Crete, Greece
19:00			Cissé 9'; Leto 40', 90+3'	Stadium: Pankritio Stadium; Attendance: 6,481; Referee: Vasilios Pamporidis

29 August 2009 2	Panionios	1 – 1	Ergotelis	Nea Smyrni, Athens, Greece
16:45	Kumordzi 24'		Romano 35'	Stadium: Nea Smyrni Stadium; Attendance: 1,198; Referee: Apostolos Ambarkiolis

13 September 2009 3	Ergotelis	1 – 0	Skoda Xanthi	Heraklion
16:45	Leal 2'			Stadium: Pankritio Stadium; Attendance: 331; Referee: Georgios Daloukas

20 September 2009 4	Levadiakos	2 – 2	Ergotelis	Levadia, Greece
16:45	Barkoglou 18', 55'		Hieblinger 69'; Budimir 75'	Stadium: Levadia Municipal Stadium; Attendance: 1,499; Referee: Konstantinos Papastamatis

27 September 2009 5	Ergotelis	4 – 0	Panthrakikos	Heraklion, Crete, Greece
16:45	Júnior 36' (pen.); Budimir 63'; Beto 87'; Leal 89'			Stadium: Pankritio Stadium; Attendance: 2,844; Referee: Anastasios Sidiropoulos

5 October 2009 6	Asteras Tripolis	2 – 4	Ergotelis	Tripoli, Greece
16:45	Marcelão 44'; Cesarec 63'		Verpakovskis 17', 22'; Orfanos 77'; Česnauskis 90+1'	Stadium: Theodoros Kolokotronis Stadium; Attendance: 2,007; Referee: Michalis Voskakis

17 October 2009 7	Ergotelis	0 – 0	Aris	Heraklion, Crete, Greece
16:45				Stadium: Pankritio Stadium; Attendance: 3,815; Referee: Georgios Stathopoulos

24 October 2009 8	Olympiacos	2 – 1	Ergotelis	Pireus, Greece
19:00	Mitroglou 38'; Dudu 85'		Shashiashvili 22'	Stadium: Karaiskakis Stadium; Attendance: 21,254; Referee: Stavros Tritsonis

1 November 2009 9	Ergotelis	2 – 2	AEK Athens	Heraklion, Crete, Greece
16:45	Leal 51', 71'		Manduca 21'; Blanco 84' (pen.)	Stadium: Pankritio Stadium; Attendance: 2,891; Referee: Dimitrios Kalopoulos

9 November 2009 10	Atromitos	0 – 0	Ergotelis	Peristeri, Athens, Greece
14:30				Stadium: Peristeri Stadium; Attendance: 1,531; Referee: Georgios Daloukas

28 November 2009 12	Iraklis	0 – 2	Ergotelis	Thessaloniki, Greece
16:45			Orfanos 50'; Budimir 84'	Stadium: Kaftanzoglio Stadium; Attendance: 2,482; Referee: Anastasios Sidiropoulos

2 December 2009 11	Ergotelis	0 – 0	AEL	Heraklion, Crete, Greece
16:45				Stadium: Pankritio Stadium; Attendance: 1,398; Referee: Georgios Daloukas

6 December 2009 13	Ergotelis	1 – 0	Kavala	Heraklion, Crete, Greece
16:45	Verpakovskis 24'			Stadium: Pankritio Stadium; Attendance: 1,695; Referee: Vasilios Pamporidis

12 December 2009 14	PAS Giannina	1 – 0	Ergotelis	Ioannina, Greece
16:45	Kousas 30'			Stadium: Zosimades Stadium; Attendance: 3,481; Referee: Dimitrios Kalopoulos

19 December 2009 15	Ergotelis	0 – 2	PAOK	Heraklion, Crete, Greece
16:45			Arabatzis 52'; Vieirinha 65'	Stadium: Pankritio Stadium; Attendance: 2,189; Referee: Stavros Tritsonis

6 January 2010 16	Panathinaikos	4 – 1	Ergotelis	Athens, Greece
16:45	Cissé 26', 66'; Karagounis 44'; Leto 90+2'		Fragoulakis 8'	Stadium: Athens Olympic Stadium; Attendance: 30,031; Referee: Michalis Tsiniaris

9 January 2010 17	Ergotelis	0 – 0	Panionios	Heraklion, Crete, Greece
16:45				Stadium: Pankritio Stadium; Attendance: 1,363; Referee: Michalis Dakos

16 January 2010 18	Skoda Xanthi	1 – 0	Ergotelis	Xanthi
19:00	Ellington 62'			Stadium: Skoda Xanthi Arena; Attendance: 879; Referee: Michalis Tsiniaris

23 January 2010 19	Ergotelis	1 – 0	Levadiakos	Heraklion, Crete, Greece
16:45	Orfanos 65'			Stadium: Pankritio Stadium; Attendance: 1,211; Referee: Stavros Tritsonis

31 January 2010 20	Panthrakikos	3 – 2	Ergotelis	Komotini, Greece
14:30	Kazakis 27'; Manú 53'; Arsenijević 86'		Orfanos 16'; Kordonouris 36'	Stadium: Komotini Municipal Stadium; Attendance: 2,269; Referee: Stavros Mantalos

7 February 2010 21	Ergotelis	4 – 3	Asteras Tripolis	Heraklion, Crete, Greece
14:30	Fragoulakis 7' (pen.); Budimir 12'; Hieblinger 28'; Beto 75'		Lazaridis 17'; Carrera 58', 64'	Stadium: Pankritio Stadium; Attendance: 1,092; Referee: Konstantinos Papastamatis

14 February 2010 22	Aris	2 – 1	Ergotelis	Thessaloniki, Greece
16:45	Koke 29'; Adu 45+1'		Beto 2'	Stadium: Kleanthis Vikelidis Stadium; Attendance: 9,258; Referee: Athanasios Giachos

20 February 2010 23	Ergotelis	1 – 1	Olympiacos	Heraklion, Crete, Greece
19:00	Budimir 85'		Torosidis 29'	Stadium: Pankritio Stadium; Attendance: 7,298; Referee: Ilias Spathas

27 February 2010 24	AEK Athens	1 – 0	Ergotelis	Athens, Greece
19:00	Djebbour 12'			Stadium: Athens Olympic Stadium; Attendance: 11,023; Referee: Michalis Dakos

7 March 2010 25	Ergotelis	1 – 1	Atromitos	Heraklion, Crete, Greece
14:30	Saganowski 82' (o.g.)		Sfakianakis 90+1'	Stadium: Pankritio Stadium; Attendance: 1,346; Referee: Petros Konstantineas

14 March 2010 26	AEL	1 – 0	Ergotelis	Larissa, Greece
16:45	Romeu 12'			Stadium: Alcazar Stadium; Attendance: 4,866; Referee: Konstantinos Papastamatis

21 March 2010 27	Ergotelis	1 – 3	Iraklis	Heraklion, Crete, Greece
19:00	Leal 14'		Roubakis 38' (o.g.); Iacob 65'; Papazaharias 87'	Stadium: Pankritio Stadium; Attendance: 1,146; Referee: Georgios Giannopoulos

28 March 2010 28	Kavala	1 – 3	Ergotelis	Kavala, Greece
19:00	Moore 33' (pen.)		Česnauskis 22'; Budimir 61'; Fragoulakis 81'	Stadium: Anthi Karagianni Stadium; Attendance: 1,305; Referee: Marios Labropoulos

11 April 2010 29	Ergotelis	3 – 1	PAS Giannina	Heraklion, Crete, Greece
19:00	Leal 36', 57' (pen.); Fragoulakis 88'		Arrache 49'	Stadium: Pankritio Stadium; Attendance: 1,179; Referee: Georgios Stathopoulos

18 April 2010 30	PAOK	4 – 1	Ergotelis	Thessaloniki, Greece
19:00	Sorlin 2'; Muslimović 10'; Cirillo 16'; Papazoglou 27'		Chrysofakis 46'	Stadium: Toumba Stadium; Attendance: 9,014; Referee: Konstantinos Papastamatis

== Greek Cup ==
=== Fourth round ===
==== Matches ====
Win Draw Loss

28 October 2009 Knockout match	Pierikos	2 – 2 (a.e.t.) (4 – 2 p)	Ergotelis	Katerini, Pieria, Greece
14:15	Tasidis 53'; Gougoulias 110'		Leal 90+1'; Shashiashvili 103'	Stadium: Katerini Stadium; Referee: Michalis Tsiniaris
	Penalties
	Gougoulias (penalty missed); Penta (penalty scored); Martínez (penalty scored); Makris (penalty scored); Giazitzoglou (penalty scored)		Beto (penalty missed); Leal (penalty scored); Fragoulakis (penalty scored); Romano (penalty missed)

== Statistics ==
=== Goal scorers ===
No.	Pos.	Nation	Name	Super League Greece	Greek Cup	Total
10	FW	(Uruguay)	Sergio Leal	7	1	8
25	FW	(Croatia)	Mario Budimir	6	0	6
12	MF	(Greece)	Dimitrios Orfanos	4	0	4
31	MF	(Greece)	Michail Fragoulakis	4	0	4
9	FW	(Latvia)	Māris Verpakovskis	3	0	3
11	MF	(Brazil) (Portugal)	Beto	3	0	3
33	FW	(Lithuania)	Deividas Česnauskis	2	0	2
5	DF	(Austria)	Mario Hieblinger	2	0	2
37	DF	(Georgia (country))	Giorgi Shashiashvili	1	1	2
24	MF	(Greece)	Christos Chrysofakis	1	0	1
8	MF	(Argentina)	Diego Romano	1	0	1
6	DF	(Greece)	Panagiotis Kordonouris	1	0	1
15	MF	(Brazil)	Silva Júnior	1	0	1
-	-	-	Opponent's own Goals	1	0	1
TOTAL				37	2	39

Last updated: 20 August 2014
