= 2011–12 Ergotelis F.C. season =

Ergotelis
2011–12 season
- Chairman: Apostolos Papoutsakis
- Manager: Nikos Karageorgiou
- Stadium: Pankritio Stadium, Heraklion
- Super League Greece: 14th
- Greek Cup: Fourth Round
- Top goalscorer: League: Nikolaos Katsikokeris (7); All: Nikolaos Katsikokeris (7)
Home colours	Away colours	Third colours

The 2011–12 season was Ergotelis' 82nd season in existence, 7th season in the Super League Greece, and the sixth consecutive since the club's latest promotion from the Football League. Ergotelis also participated in the Greek cup, entering the competition in the Fourth Round. Despite the season taking off on a promising start, subsequent weak performances and a disastrous championship second round saw the team finish in 14th place, thus being relegated to the Football League for the second time in its history. A few months later, iconic club president Apostolos Papoutsakis died at the age of 60.

== Players ==
No.	Name	Nationality	Position (s)	Date of birth (age)	Signed from	Notes
Goalkeepers
1	Sören Pirson	(Germany)	GK	27 August 1985 (27)	(Germany) Rot-Weiß Oberhausen	
40	Zacharias Kavousakis	(Greece)	GK	11 January 1989 (23)	Youth system	
78	Ioannis Dermitzakis	(Greece)	GK	5 November 1992 (20)	Youth system	Winter transfer window
84	Grigorios Athanasiou	(Greece)	GK	9 March 1984 (28)	(Greece) P.O. Atsalenios	
Defenders
4	Borislav Jovanović	(Serbia)	CB	16 August 1986 (26)	(Serbia) Inđija	
5	Mario Hieblinger	(Austria)	CB	5 July 1977 (35)	(Austria) Grazer AK	
55	Manolis Kandilakis	(Greece)	CB	4 April 1990 (22)	Youth system	
89	Georgios Sarris	(Greece)	CB	8 September 1989 (23)	Youth system	
33	Filippos Darlas	(Greece)	LB	23 October 1983 (29)	Free agent	Winter transfer window
17	Manolis Tzanakakis	(Greece)	RB	30 April 1992 (20)	Youth system	Winter transfer window
27	Lefteris Gialousis	(Greece)	RB	18 July 1985 (27)	(Greece) Irodotos	
37	Giorgi Shashiashvili	(Georgia (country))	RB	1 September 1979 (33)	(Austria) Sturm Graz	
Midfielders
15	Silva Júnior	(Brazil)	DM	24 September 1976 (36)	(Portugal) Paços Ferreira	
23	Egutu Oliseh	(Nigeria) (France)	DM	18 November 1980 (32)	(Greece) Panthrakikos	On loan
2	Ilias Kyriakidis	(Greece)	CM	5 August 1985 (27)	(Greece) AEL	
11	Beto	(Brazil) (Portugal)	CM	20 November 1976 (36)	(Switzerland) Sion	
19	Andreas Bouchalakis	(Greece)	CM	5 April 1993 (21)	Youth system	
21	Bruno Chalkiadakis	(Greece) (Brazil)	CM / RM	7 April 1993 (19)	Youth system	Anterior cruciate ligament injury (injured) Source
77	Vasilios Rentzas	(Greece)	CM / RM	16 April 1992 (20)	(Greece) AEL	
8	Diego Romano	(Argentina)	AM	11 March 1980 (32)	(Argentina) San Martín de Tucumán	Anterior cruciate ligament injury (injured) Source
17	Angelos Chanti	(Greece)	AM	7 September 1989 (23)	(Greece) Olympiakos Chersonissos	
24	Christos Chrysofakis	(Greece)	AM	18 January 1990 (22)	Youth system	Anterior cruciate ligament injury (injured) Source
31	Michail Fragoulakis	(Greece)	AM	15 July 1983 (29)	(Greece) P.O. Atsalenios	
Forwards
7	Vasilios Koutsianikoulis	(Greece)	LW	9 August 1988 (24)	(Greece) PAOK	
14	Nikolaos Karelis	(Greece)	LW	24 February 1992 (20)	Youth system	
10	Sergio Leal	(Uruguay)	RW	25 September 1982 (30)	(Uruguay) Danubio	
9	Nikolaos Katsikokeris	(Greece)	CF	19 June 1988 (24)	(Greece) Platanias	
25	Mario Budimir	(Croatia)	CF	12 February 1986 (26)	(Croatia) Hajduk Split	
93	Sokratis Evaggelou	(Greece)	CF	21 July 1993 (19)	(Greece) Filoktitis Melivoia	

=== The following players have departed in mid-season ===
6	Tomasz Wisio	(Poland)	CB	20 January 1982 (30)	(Austria) LASK Linz	Released
13	Claudio Dadómo	(Uruguay) (Italy)	LB	10 February 1982 (30)	(Greece) AEK Athens	Released

=== Out of team ===
Note: Flags indicate national team as has been defined under FIFA eligibility rules. Players and Managers may hold more than one non-FIFA nationality.

Head coach	Captain	Kit manufacturer	Shirt sponsor
(Greece) Nikos Karageorgiou	(Brazil) Silva Júnior	Macron	Lotto

== Transfers ==
=== In ===
Squad #	Position	Transfer Window	Player	Transferred From	Fee	Date
9	FW	(Greece) Nikolaos Katsikokeris	Summer	(Greece) Platanias	Free	31 May 2011
4	DF	(Serbia) Borislav Jovanović	Summer	(Serbia) Inđija	Free	1 June 2011
93	FW	(Greece) Sokratis Evaggelou	Summer	(Greece) Filoktitis Melivoia	Free	13 June 2011
1	GK	(Germany) Sören Pirson	Summer	(Germany) Rot-Weiß Oberhausen	Free	24 June 2011
N/A	MF	(Greece) Georgios Siakkas	Summer	(Greece) Doxa Dramas	Loan return	1 July 2011
N/A	DF	(Greece) Georgios Seliniotakis	Summer	(Greece) Giouchtas	Loan return	1 July 2011
7	FW	(Greece) Vasilios Koutsianikoulis	Summer	(Greece) PAOK	▼450.000 €	10 July 2011
13	DF	(Uruguay) (Italy) Claudio Dadómo	Summer	(Greece) AEK Athens	Free	26 July 2011
77	MF	(Greece) Vasilios Rentzas	Summer	(Greece) AEL	Free	30 August 2011
33	DF	(Greece) Filippos Darlas	Winter	Free agent	Free	23 January 2012

=== Promoted from youth system ===
Squad #	Position	Player	Date	Signed Until
19	MF	(Greece) Andreas Bouchalakis	19 May 2011	30 June 2016
21	MF	(Greece) (Brazil) Bruno Chalkiadakis	24 May 2011	30 June 2016
17	DF	(Greece) Manolis Tzanakakis	29 November 2011	30 June 2016
78	GK	(Greece) Ioannis Dermitzakis	5 January 2012	30 December 2017

Total spending: ▼450.000 €

== Out ==
Position	Player	Transfer Window	Transferred To	Fee	Date
DF	(Greece) Manolis Roubakis	Summer	Free agent	Released	12 May 2011
MF	(Greece) Dimitrios Orfanos	Summer	(Greece) Panserraikos	Free	12 May 2011
DF	(Greece) Georgios Alexopoulos	Summer	Free agent	End of career	12 May 2011
FW	(Latvia) Māris Verpakovskis	Summer	(Azerbaijan) Baku	Free	30 May 2011
MF	(Greece) Georgios Siakkas	Summer	(Greece) Fokikos	Free	1 July 2011
GK	(Greece) Iosif Daskalakis	Summer	(Greece) Olympiacos	Free	1 July 2011
DF	(Uruguay) (Italy) Claudio Dadómo	Winter	Free agent	Released	16 January 2012
DF	(Poland) Tomasz Wisio	Winter	(Germany) RB Leipzig	Free	22 January 2012

Total income: ▲0.000 €

Expenditure: ▼450.000 €

== Managerial changes ==
Outgoing manager	Manner of departure	Date of vacancy	Position in table	Incoming manager	Date of appointment
(Greece) Nikos Karageorgiou	Mutual Consent	30 April 2012	14th	(Cyprus) (Serbia) Siniša Gogić	28 June 2012

== Pre-season and friendlies ==
=== Pre-season friendlies ===
Win Draw Loss

24 July 2011 Friendly	FC Utrecht (Netherlands)	0 – 0	(Greece) Ergotelis	Utrecht, Netherlands
14:00				Stadium: Sportcomplex Zoudenbalch; Attendance: 1,000

27 July 2011 Friendly	Ergotelis (Greece)	2 – 2	(Turkey) Samsunspor	Garderen, Gelderland, Netherlands
18:00	Jovanović 50'; Budimir 90'		Çalık 37'; Saracoğlu 53'	Stadium: Garderen Training Centre

30 July 2011 Friendly	De Graafschap (Netherlands)	0 – 1	(Greece) Ergotelis	Garderen, Gelderland, Netherlands
18:00			Bouchalakis 48'	Stadium: Garderen Training Centre

31 July 2011 Friendly	AZ Alkmaar (Netherlands)	1 – 0	(Greece) Ergotelis	Garderen, Gelderland, Netherlands
18:00	Ortiz 15'			Stadium: Garderen Training Centre

5 August 2011 Friendly	Ergotelis (Greece)	1 – 2	(Turkey) Beşiktaş	Cologne, Germany
19:00	Karelis 75'		Sivok 42'; Aurélio 48'

6 August 2011 Friendly	Jong Ajax (Netherlands)	0 – 0	(Greece) Ergotelis	Garderen, Gelderland, Netherlands
18:00				Stadium: Garderen Training Centre

13 August 2011 Friendly	Giouchtas (Greece)	0 – 4	(Greece) Ergotelis	Archanes, Heraklion, Crete, Greece
18:00			Katsikokeris 35'; Evaggelou 39', 55', 57'	Stadium: National Archanes Stadium

14 August 2011 Friendly	Ergotelis (Greece)	2 – 1	(Greece) Rouvas	Heraklion, Crete, Greece
19:00	Leal 55'; Koutsianikoulis 56'		Milošević 90'	Stadium: Pankritio Stadium

20 August 2011 Friendly	Ergotelis (Greece)	4 – 3	(Greece) Olympiakos Chersonissos	Heraklion, Crete, Greece
18:30	Karelis 33'; Chalkiadakis 34'; Evaggelou 38'; Domatas 77'		Kapetanakis 31'; Gourgiotis 59', 70'	Stadium: Pankritio Stadium, Training Ground

21 August 2011 Friendly	Platanias (Greece)	0 – 0	(Greece) Ergotelis	Maleme, Chania, Crete, Greece
18:30				Stadium: Maleme Stadium

=== Mid-season friendlies ===
Win Draw Loss

29 August 2011 Friendly	Ergotelis (Greece)	3 – 3	(Greece) Olympiakos Chersonissos	Heraklion, Crete, Greece
18:30	Katsikokeris 37'; Evaggelou 41'; Gialousis 90'		Kapetanakis 49'; Gourgiotis 50'; Tepetos 65'	Stadium: Pankritio Stadium, Training Ground

3 September 2011 Friendly	OFI (Greece)	0 – 0	(Greece) Ergotelis	Heraklion, Crete, Greece
19:00				Stadium: Theodoros Vardinogiannis Stadium

9 October 2011 Friendly	Chania (Greece)	2 – 2	(Greece) Ergotelis	Chania, Crete, Greece
18:00	Antonopoulos 15'; Vestakis 90'		Rentzas 45'; Evaggelou 75'	Stadium: Perivolia Municipal Stadium

10 October 2011 Friendly	Ergotelis (Greece)	1 – 0	(Greece) Olympiakos Chersonissos	Heraklion, Crete, Greece
18:00	Chanti 86'			Stadium: Pankritio Stadium, Training Ground

7 November 2011 Friendly	Ergotelis (Greece)	4 – 0	(Greece) Rouvas	Heraklion, Crete, Greece
16:00	Kyriakidis 8'; Chanti 28', 42', 48'			Stadium: Pankritio Stadium, Training Ground

13 November 2011 Friendly	Ergotelis (Greece)	0 – 1	(Greece) Rouvas	Heraklion, Crete, Greece
15:00			Perogamvrakis 6' (pen.)	Stadium: Pankritio Stadium, Training Ground

=== Post-season friendlies ===
Win Draw Loss

9 May 2012 Friendly	OFI (Greece)	3 – 4	(Greece) Ergotelis	Heraklion, Crete, Greece
18:30	Šišić 18' (pen.); Mantzios 49', 75' (pen.)		Bourselis 13'; Karelis 15'; Oliseh 51' (pen.); Koutsianikoulis 68'	Stadium: Theodoros Vardinogiannis Stadium

17 May 2012 Friendly	Ergotelis (Greece)	3 – 1	(Greece) Giouchtas	Heraklion, Crete, Greece
18:00	Bourselis 16'; Katsikokeris; Domatas 59'		Aerakis 72'	Stadium: Pankritio Stadium

== Competitions ==
=== Overview ===
Competition	Started round	Current position / round	Final position / round	First match	Last match
Super League Greece	1	14th	14th	28 August	22 April
Greek Football Cup	Fourth Round	Fourth Round	Fourth Round	21 December	21 December

Last updated: 29 July 2014

== Super League Greece ==
=== League table ===
Pos	Team	Pld	W	D	L	GF	GA	GD	Pts	Qualification or relegation
12	Panionios	30	9	6	15	26	34	−8	33	
13	Kerkyra	30	8	8	14	31	44	−13	32	
14	Ergotelis (R)	30	7	8	15	27	44	−17	29	Relegation to the Football League
15	Panetolikos (R)	30	7	7	16	23	37	−14	28	Relegation to the Football League
16	Doxa Drama (R)	30	4	5	21	11	42	−31	17	Relegation to the Football League

Source: Super League Greece
Rules for classification: 1) Points, 2) Head-to-head points, 3) Head-to-head goal difference.
If in current league table there are tied teams after applying criteria 1 to 3, they are considered to share places and listed in Greek language alphabetic order.
If in final league table there are still tied teams after applying criteria 1 to 3, a decision match (or matches if they are more than two) are to be played but only in three cases: to determine the champion, to fill spots in the play-off or to determine the teams to be relegated. In any other case, the final standings of tied teams are determined with a public draw
(R) Relegated

=== Results summary ===
Overall								Home						Away					
Pld	W	D	L	GF	GA	GD	Pts	W	D	L	GF	GA	GD	W	D	L	GF	GA	GD
30	7	8	15	27	44	−17	29	6	4	5	17	16	+1	1	4	10	10	28	−18

Last updated: 31 July 2014.
Source: Competitive matches

=== Matches ===
Win Draw Loss

28 August 2011 1	Panionios	2 – 2	Ergotelis	Nea Smyrni, Athens, Greece
19:15	Riera 11'; Kumordzi 72'		Fragoulakis 52'; Júnior 90'	Stadium: Nea Smyrni Stadium; Attendance: 1,837; Referee: Athanasios Giachos

10 September 2011 2	Ergotelis	2 – 1	PAOK	Heraklion, Crete, Greece
19:30	Leal 85'; Budimir 87'		Balafas 68'	Stadium: Pankritio Stadium; Attendance: 1,758; Referee: Dimitrios Styliaras

18 September 2011 3	AEK Athens	1 – 0	Ergotelis	Athens, Greece
18:15	Makos 31'			Stadium: OAKA; Attendance: Behind closed doors Referee: Georgios Kominis

24 September 2011 4	Ergotelis	2 – 3	Olympiacos	Heraklion, Crete, Greece
19:30	Romano 55', 85'		Mirallas 4'; Fuster 42' (pen.); Marcano 76'	Stadium: Pankritio Stadium; Attendance: 5,120; Referee: Andreas Pappas

1 October 2011 5	OFI	1 – 0	Ergotelis	Heraklion, Crete, Greece
19:30	Šišić 30'			Stadium: Theodoros Vardinogiannis Stadium; Attendance: 3,723; Referee: Dimitrios Kyrkos

16 October 2011 6	Ergotelis	1 – 1	Aris Thessaloniki	Heraklion, Crete, Greece
18:15	Budimir 90+3'		Sankaré 45+1'	Stadium: Pankritio Stadium; Attendance: 1,129; Referee: Dimitrios Thanos

22 October 2011 7	Panathinaikos	4 – 0	Ergotelis	Athens, Greece
19:30	Boumsong 7'; Leto 25', 57' (pen.); Katsouranis 32'			Stadium: OAKA; Attendance: 13,012; Referee: Christos Mitsios

30 October 2011 8	Ergotelis	2 – 0	Asteras Tripolis	Heraklion, Crete, Greece
15:00	Shashiashvili 8'; Katsikokeris 37'			Stadium: Pankritio Stadium; Attendance: 956; Referee: Georgios Kominis

6 November 2011 9	Ergotelis	0 – 0	Panetolikos	Heraklion, Crete, Greece
15:00				Stadium: Pankritio Stadium; Attendance: 1,052; Referee: Praxitelis Zachariadis

19 November 2011 10	Kerkyra	2 – 1	Ergotelis	Kerkyra, Greece
17:15	Ioannou 33' (pen.); Shashiashvili 55' (o.g.)		Katsikokeris 9'	Stadium: Kerkyra Stadium; Attendance: 850; Referee: Petros Konstantineas

26 November 2011 11	Ergotelis	2 – 1	PAS Giannina	Heraklion, Crete, Greece
17:15	Fragoulakis 15'; Kotsios 63' (o.g.)		Bakayoko 80' (pen.)	Stadium: Pankritio Stadium; Attendance: 1,022; Referee: Ilias Spathas

3 December 2011 12	Atromitos	1 – 0	Ergotelis	Peristeri, Athens, Greece
17:15	Mitroglou 16'			Stadium: Peristeri Stadium; Attendance: 2,251; Referee: Spyros Selimos

11 December 2011 13	Ergotelis	2 – 1	Doxa Drama	Heraklion, Crete, Greece
17:15	Fragoulakis 5'; Katsikokeris 67'		Kanakoudis 45'	Stadium: Pankritio Stadium; Attendance: 1,015; Referee: Antonis Papapetrou

17 December 2011 14	Levadiakos	0 – 1	Ergotelis	Levadia, Greece
17:15			Lisgaras 7' (o.g.)	Stadium: Levadia Municipal Stadium; Attendance: 681; Referee: Praxitelis Zachariadis

4 January 2012 15	Ergotelis	1 – 2	Skoda Xanthi	Heraklion
15:00	Katsikokeris 45+1'		Markovski 49', 76'	Stadium: Pankritio Stadium; Attendance: 1,056; Referee: Anastasios Kakos

7 January 2012 16	Ergotelis	1 – 0	Panionios	Heraklion, Crete, Greece
17:15	Leal 15' (pen.)			Stadium: Pankritio Stadium; Attendance: 1,008; Referee: Dimitrios Styliaras

15 January 2012 17	PAOK	2 – 1	Ergotelis	Thessaloniki, Greece
17:15	Salpingidis 55'; Lino 80' (pen.)		Koutsianikoulis 32'	Stadium: Toumba Stadium; Attendance: 8,260; Referee: Dimitrios Thanos

21 January 2012 18	Ergotelis	1 – 1	AEK Athens	Heraklion, Crete, Greece
17:15	Katsikokeris 74'		Liberopoulos 49'	Stadium: Pankritio Stadium; Attendance: 1,352; Referee: Alexandros Aretopoulos

28 January 2012 19	Olympiacos	3 – 0	Ergotelis	Pireus, Greece
19:30	Pantelić 58'; Mellberg 65'; Fetfatzidis 90'			Stadium: Karaiskakis Stadium; Attendance: 15,029; Referee: Anastasios Kakos

4 February 2012 20	Ergotelis	0 – 1	OFI	Heraklion, Crete, Greece
17:15			Papoulis 9'	Stadium: Pankritio Stadium; Attendance: 3,964; Referee: Ilias Spathas

12 February 2012 21	Aris	1 – 1	Ergotelis	Thessaloniki, Greece
17:15	Acosta 14'		Katsikokeris 31'	Stadium: Kleanthis Vikelidis Stadium; Attendance: 6,748; Referee: Georgios Daskalopoulos

18 February 2012 22	Ergotelis	0 – 2	Panathinaikos	Heraklion, Crete, Greece
17:15			Simão 55'; Mavrias 59'	Stadium: Pankritio Stadium; Attendance: 3,954; Referee: Anastasios Kakos

4 March 2012 23	Asteras Tripolis	3 – 0	Ergotelis	Tripoli, Greece
15:00	Navarro 34', 71'; Rayos 57'			Stadium: Theodoros Kolokotronis Stadium; Attendance: 1,223; Referee: Gerasimos Ditsios

11 March 2012 24	Panetolikos	2 – 0	Ergotelis	Agrinio, Greece
17:15	Charisteas 23'; Camara 51' (pen.)			Stadium: Panetolikos Stadium; Attendance: 3,368; Referee: Praxitelis Zachariadis

17 March 2012 25	Ergotelis	1 – 0	Kerkyra	Heraklion, Crete, Greece
17:15	Leal 57'			Stadium: Pankritio Stadium; Attendance: 2,130; Referee: Georgios Daskalopoulos

25 March 2012 26	PAS Giannina	1 – 1	Ergotelis	Ioannina, Greece
17:15	Vila 59'		Gialousis 90+1'	Stadium: Zosimades Stadium; Attendance: 3,633; Referee: Ilias Spathas

1 April 2012 27	Ergotelis	2 – 2	Atromitos	Heraklion, Crete, Greece
19:00	Jovanović 74'; Katsikokeris 80'		Anastasakos 51' (pen.); Mitroglou 64' (pen.)	Stadium: Pankritio Stadium; Attendance: 2,118; Referee: Georgios Kominis

8 April 2012 28	Doxa Drama	1 – 1	Ergotelis	Thessaloniki, Greece
19:00	Soiledis 40'		Chanti 23'	Stadium: Kaftanzoglio Stadium; Attendance: 42; Referee: Gerasimos Ditsios

18 April 2012 29	Ergotelis	0 – 1	Levadiakos	Heraklion, Crete, Greece
19:00			Chumbinho 56'	Stadium: Pankritio Stadium; Attendance: 2,985; Referee: Anastasios Sidiropoulos

22 April 2012 30	Skoda Xanthi	4 – 2	Ergotelis	Xanthi
19:00	Mantalos 67'; Souanis 75'; Tsoumanis 81'; Altiparmakovski 90'		Júnior 72'; Leal 86'	Stadium: Skoda Xanthi Arena; Attendance: 827; Referee: Stavros Tritsonis

== Greek Cup ==
=== Fourth round ===
==== Matches ====
Win Draw Loss

21 December 2011 Knockout match	Panserraikos	1 – 0 (a.e.t.)	Ergotelis	Serres, Greece
15:30	da Costa 109'			Stadium: Serres Municipal Stadium; Attendance: 600; Referee: Stavros Tritsonis

== Statistics ==
=== Goal scorers ===
No.	Pos.	Nation	Name	Super League Greece	Greek Cup	Total
9	FW	(Greece)	Nikolaos Katsikokeris	7	0	7
10	FW	(Uruguay)	Sergio Leal	4	0	4
31	MF	(Greece)	Michail Fragoulakis	3	0	3
8	MF	(Argentina)	Diego Romano	2	0	2
25	FW	(Croatia)	Mario Budimir	2	0	2
15	MF	(Brazil)	Silva Júnior	2	0	2
17	MF	(Greece)	Angelos Chanti	1	0	1
4	DF	(Serbia)	Borislav Jovanović	1	0	1
37	DF	(Georgia (country))	Giorgi Shashiashvili	1	0	1
7	FW	(Greece)	Vasilios Koutsianikoulis	1	0	1
27	DF	(Greece)	Lefteris Gialousis	1	0	1
-	-	-	Opponent's own Goals	2	0	2
TOTAL				27	0	27

Last updated: 25 April 2014
