= 2008–09 Ergotelis F.C. season =

Ergotelis
2008–09 season
- Chairman: Apostolos Papoutsakis
- Manager: Nikos Karageorgiou
- Stadium: Pankritio Stadium, Heraklion
- Super League Greece: 9th
- Greek Cup: Fourth Round
- Top goalscorer: League: Patrick Ogunsoto (8); All: Patrick Ogunsoto (8)
Home colours	Away colours	Third colours

The 2008–09 season was Ergotelis' 79th season in existence, 4th season in the Super League Greece, and the third consecutive since the club's latest promotion from the Football League. Ergotelis also participated in the Greek cup, entering the competition in the Fourth Round.

== Players ==
No.	Name	Nationality	Position (s)	Date of birth (age)	Signed from	Notes
Goalkeepers
1	Iosif Daskalakis	(Greece)	GK	7 August 1982 (26)	(Greece) OFI	
30	Zsolt Posza	(Hungary)	GK	11 May 1977 (32)	(Hungary) Vasas	
40	Zacharias Kavousakis	(Greece)	GK	11 January 1989 (20)	Youth System	
84	Grigorios Athanasiou	(Greece)	GK	9 March 1984 (25)	(Greece) P.O. Atsalenios	
Defenders
5	Mario Hieblinger	(Austria)	CB	5 July 1977 (31)	(Austria) Grazer AK	
6	Panagiotis Kordonouris	(Greece)	CB	8 November 1975 (33)	(Greece) Skoda Xanthi	
13	Georgios Seliniotakis	(Greece)	CB	18 August 1989 (19)	Youth System	
20	Maurício Fernandes	(Brazil)	CB	5 July 1976 (32)	(Portugal) Estrela Amadora	
89	Georgios Sarris	(Greece)	CB	8 September 1989 (19)	Youth System	
3	Dimitrios Geladaris	(Greece)	LB	6 November 1974 (34)	(Greece) Atromitos	
21	Ioannis Kiliaras	(Greece)	LB / LM	9 June 1988 (21)	Youth System	
33	Charis Mattheakis	(Greece)	LB	29 September 1983 (25)	(Greece) P.O. Atsalenios	
26	Gernot Plassnegger	(Austria)	RB	23 March 1978 (31)	Austria Kärnten	
27	Lefteris Gialousis	(Greece)	RB	18 July 1985 (23)	(Greece) Irodotos	
Midfielders
4	Labros Kefaloukos	(Greece)	DM	31 March 1982 (27)	(Greece) OFI	
15	Silva Júnior	(Brazil)	DM	24 September 1976 (32)	(Portugal) Paços Ferreira	
18	Daniel Kenedy	(Portugal)	DM	18 February 1974 (35)	(Cyprus) APOEL	
11	Beto	(Brazil)	CM	20 November 1976 (32)	(Switzerland) Sion	Winter Transfer Window
12	Dimitrios Orfanos	(Greece)	CM	2 November 1982 (26)	(Greece) PAOK	
7	Rogério Martins	(Brazil)	AM	19 November 1984 (age 24)	(Greece) Asteras Tripolis	On loan
8	Diego Romano	(Argentina)	AM	11 March 1980 (29)	(Argentina) San Martín de Tucumán	
24	Christos Chrysofakis	(Greece)	AM	18 January 1990 (19)	Youth System	
31	Michail Fragoulakis	(Greece)	AM	15 July 1983 (25)	(Greece) P.O. Atsalenios	
Forwards
19	Vasilios Koutsianikoulis	(Greece)	LW	9 August 1988 (20)	(Greece) Iraklis Chalkis	
7	Nikolaos Karelis	(Greece)	LW	24 February 1992 (17)	Youth System	
9	Patrick Ogunsoto	(Nigeria)	CF	19 April 1983 (26)	(Belgium) Westerlo	
25	Mario Budimir	(Croatia)	CF	12 February 1986 (23)	(Croatia) Hajduk Split	
10	Georgios Vakouftsis	(Greece)	CF	30 January 1980 (29)	(Cyprus) Omonia	

=== The following players have departed in mid-season ===
11	Dimitrios Grammozis	(Greece) (Germany)	CM	8 July 1978 (30)	(Germany) Rot-Weiss Essen	Released

=== Out of team ===
Note: Flags indicate national team as has been defined under FIFA eligibility rules. Players and Managers may hold more than one non-FIFA nationality.

Head coach	Captain	Kit manufacturer	Shirt sponsor
(Greece) Nikos Karageorgiou	(Guinea-Bissau) (Portugal) Daniel Kenedy	Lotto	Lotto

== Transfers ==
=== In ===
Squad #	Position	Transfer Window	Player	Transferred From	Fee	Date
3	DF	(Greece) Dimitrios Geladaris	Summer	(Greece) Atromitos	Free	12 May 2008
26	DF	(Austria) Gernot Plassnegger	Summer	Austria Kärnten	Free	27 May 2008
12	MF	(Greece) Dimitrios Orfanos	Summer	(Greece) PAOK	Free	25 June 2008
8	MF	(Argentina) Diego Romano	Summer	(Argentina) San Martín de Tucumán	Free	25 June 2008
20	DF	(Brazil) Maurício Fernandes	Summer	(Portugal) Estrela Amadora	Free	27 June 2008
7	MF	(Brazil) Rogério Martins	Summer	(Greece) Asteras Tripolis	Loan	3 July 2008

=== Promoted from youth system ===
Squad #	Position	Player	Date	Signed Until
24	MF	(Greece) Christos Chrysofakis	22 July 2008	30 June 2013
13	DF	(Greece) Georgios Seliniotakis	13 November 2008	30 June 2013

Total spending: ▼0.000 €

=== Out ===
Position	Player	Transfer Window	Transferred To	Fee	Date
MF	(Greece) Paschalis Melissas	Summer	(Greece) Atromitos	Free	6 May 2008
MF	(Serbia) Ivan Tasić	Summer	(Greece) Kalamata	Free	13 May 2008
MF	(United States) Clint Mathis	Summer	(United States) Real Salt Lake	Free	15 May 2008
MF	(Greece) Dimitrios Kiliaras	Summer	(Greece) Panionios	▲€600.000	16 May 2008
MF	(Greece) Giorgos Theodoridis	Summer	(Germany) Frankfurt	Free	16 May 2008
FW	(Greece) Marios Mavroudis	Summer	(Greece) Kavala	Free	15 June 2008
DF	(Croatia) Darko Miladin	Summer	(Croatia) Rijeka	Free	2 July 2008

Total income: ▲600.000 €

Expenditure: ▲600.000 €

== Pre-season and friendlies ==
=== Pre-season friendlies ===
Win Draw Loss

23 July 2008 Friendly	Ergotelis (Greece)	1 – 0	(Greece) Olympiakos Chersonissos	Heraklion, Crete, Greece
19:30	Chrysofakis 32'	Report		Stadium: Pankritio Stadium, Training Ground

29 July 2008 Friendly	Ergotelis (Greece)	0 – 3	(Netherlands) Go Ahead Eagles	Terwolde, Gelderland, Netherlands
19:00		Report	te Boekhorst 29'; Ahahaoui 45'; Türk 86'	Stadium: Sportcomplex De Woldermarck

1 August 2008 Friendly	FC Zutphen (Netherlands)	2 – 5	(Greece) Ergotelis	Roden, Drenthe, Netherlands
19:50	van Duijn 15'; Rotman 63'	Report	Karelis 27'; Rogério 51'; Kiliaras 61'; Ogunsoto 77', 81'	Stadium: Hulhorst Sportcentrum

3 August 2008 Friendly	Haarlem (Netherlands)	0 – 2	(Greece) Ergotelis	Haarlem, Netherlands
14:30	Report		Budimir 49'; Fragoulakis 62'	Stadium: Haarlem Stadion

5 August 2008 Friendly	Volendam (Netherlands)	0 – 1	(Greece) Ergotelis	Langedijk, Netherlands
19:00		Report	Rogério 85'	Stadium: Langedijk Stadion

7 August 2008 Friendly	De Graafschap (Netherlands)	1 – 1	(Greece) Ergotelis	Zelhem, Gelderland, Netherlands
19:00	den Ouden 65'	Report	Geladaris 31'	Stadium: Zelhem Training Center

13 August 2008 Friendly	OFI (Greece)	0 – 2	(Greece) Ergotelis	Heraklion, Crete, Greece
18:30		Report	Júnior 59' (pen.); Budimir 80'	Stadium: Vardinogiannio Training Center

24 August 2008 Friendly	Diagoras (Greece)	0 – 2	(Greece) Ergotelis	Rhodes, Greece
20:30		Report	Romano 21'; Budimir 48'	Stadium: Diagoras Stadium

=== Mid-season friendlies ===
Win Draw Loss

7 September 2008 Friendly	Ergotelis (Greece)	4 – 2	(Greece) Asteras Rethymno	Heraklion, Crete, Greece
19:00	Ogunsoto 4'; Budimir 38'; Maurício 52'; Vakouftsis 88'	Report	Jelić 61' (pen.); Kariavasam 81'	Stadium: Pankritio Stadium

24 September 2008 Friendly	Ergotelis (Greece)	7 – 0	(Greece) Almyros	Heraklion, Crete, Greece
17:30	Maurício 16'; Ogunsoto 32'; Chrysofakis 50'; Kordonouris 65'; Júnior 70'; Romano 83'; Fragoulakis 87'	Report		Stadium: Pankritio Stadium, Training Ground

=== Post-season friendlies ===
Win Draw Loss

27 April 2010 Friendly	Ergotelis (Greece)	4 – 0	(Greece) Olympiakos Chersonissos	Heraklion, Crete, Greece
17:30	Leal 40'; Verpakovskis 62' (pen.); Budimir 75', 78'			Stadium: Pankritio Stadium

13 May 2010 Friendly	Ergotelis (Greece)	2 – 2	(Greece) Giouchtas	Heraklion, Crete, Greece
18:00	Leal 37'; Budimir 71'		Tsafantakis 13', 20'	Stadium: Pankritio Stadium, Training Ground

22 May 2010 Friendly	Chania (Greece)	3 – 3	(Greece) Ergotelis	Chania, Crete, Greece
17:00	Goniotakis 37'; Seliniotakis 43'; Oglü 74'		Karelis 4', 21'; Koulakis 61' (o.g.)	Stadium: Perivolia Municipal Stadium

== Competitions ==
=== Overview ===
Competition	Started round	Current position / round	Final position / round	First match	Last match
Super League Greece	1	11th	11th	22 August	18 April
Greek Football Cup	Fourth Round	Fourth Round	Fourth Round	28 October	28 October

Last updated: 5 August 2014

== League table (regular season) ==
Pos	Team	Pld	W	D	L	GF	GA	GD	Pts
7	Skoda Xanthi	30	9	11	10	25	21	+4	38
8	Panionios	30	10	7	13	40	40	0	37
9	Ergotelis	30	9	9	12	31	39	−8	36
10	Iraklis	30	8	9	13	22	38	−16	33 (Note: Head-to-head points: Iraklis 7, Panthrakikos 6, Asteras Tripolis 2.)
11	Panthrakikos	30	9	6	15	23	37	−14	33

Source: Super League Greece
Rules for classification: 1) Points; 2) Head-to-head points; 3) Head-to-head goal difference; 4) Play-offs (neutral ground).
(Note: Criterion 4 is only used if needed to decide champion, teams for relegation or teams for UEFA competitions).

== Results summary ==
Overall								Home						Away					
Pld	W	D	L	GF	GA	GD	Pts	W	D	L	GF	GA	GD	W	D	L	GF	GA	GD
30	9	9	12	37	41	−4	36	6	6	3	19	16	+3	3	3	9	18	25	−7

Last updated: 31 July 2014.
Source: Competitive matches

=== Matches ===
Win Draw Loss

30 August 2008 1	Panthrakikos	1 – 2	Ergotelis	Komotini, Greece
19:00	Henríquez 29'	Report	Ogunsoto 52', 82'	Stadium: Komotini Municipal Stadium; Attendance: 2,650; Referee: Lazaros Polatian

14 September 2008 2	Ergotelis	3 – 0	Aris	Heraklion, Crete, Greece
19:00	Budimir 24'; Ogunsoto 31', 39'	Report		Stadium: Pankritio Stadium; Attendance: 1,683; Referee: Ilias Mazarakos

21 September 2008 3	Ergotelis	1 – 1	Levadiakos	Heraklion, Crete, Greece
17:00	Orfanos 2'	Report	Montoya 37'	Stadium: Pankritio Stadium; Attendance: 1,016; Referee: Evangelos Katsidonis

29 October 2008 4	Panathinaikos	2 – 3	Ergotelis	Athens, Greece
19:00	Gabriel 7'; Christodoulopoulos 53'	Report	Koutsianikoulis 47', 51'; Budimir 62'	Stadium: Athens Olympic Stadium; Attendance: 13,017; Referee: Dimitrios Kalopoulos

4 October 2008 5	Ergotelis	0 – 0	PAOK	Heraklion, Crete, Greece
19:00		Report		Stadium: Pankritio Stadium; Attendance: 2,446; Referee: Georgios Daloukas

18 October 2008 6	Iraklis	0 – 0	Ergotelis	Thessaloniki, Greece
16:45		Report		Stadium: Kaftanzoglio Stadium; Attendance: 4,794; Referee: Ilias Spathas

26 October 2008 7	Ergotelis	2 – 5	Panionios	Heraklion, Crete, Greece
16:45	Grammozis 76' (pen.), 86'	Report	Choutos 22' (pen.), 77'; Recoba 27', 61'; Kumordzi 84'	Stadium: Pankritio Stadium; Attendance: 2,145; Referee: Marios Labropoulos

2 November 2008 8	Olympiacos	2 – 0	Ergotelis	Pireus, Greece
19:00	Kovačević 28'; Dudu 34'	Report		Stadium: Karaiskakis Stadium; Attendance: 26,058; Referee: Ioannis Stavridis

9 November 2008 9	Ergotelis	2 – 1	AEL	Heraklion, Crete, Greece
16:45	Ogunsoto 28', 59'	Report	Parra 79'	Stadium: Pankritio Stadium; Attendance: 2,119; Referee: Nikitas Datis

16 November 2008 10	Ergotelis	1 – 2	Thrasyvoulos	Heraklion, Crete, Greece
15:00	Orfanos 86'	Report	Wellington 33'; Gialousis 90+5' (o.g.)	Stadium: Pankritio Stadium; Attendance: 2,143; Referee: Georgios Kastanidis

23 November 2008 12	Asteras Tripolis	3 – 1	Ergotelis	Tripoli, Greece
15:00	Cesarec 8', 34', 38'	Report	Orfanos 42'	Stadium: Theodoros Kolokotronis Stadium; Attendance: 1,896; Referee: Christofors Zografos

2 December 2009 11	Ergotelis	0 – 0	AEL	Heraklion, Crete, Greece
16:45				Stadium: Pankritio Stadium; Attendance: 1,398; Referee: Georgios Daloukas

6 December 2009 13	Ergotelis	1 – 0	Kavala	Heraklion, Crete, Greece
16:45	Verpakovskis 24'			Stadium: Pankritio Stadium; Attendance: 1,695; Referee: Vasilios Pamporidis

12 December 2009 14	PAS Giannina	1 – 0	Ergotelis	Ioannina, Greece
16:45	Kousas 30'			Stadium: Zosimades Stadium; Attendance: 3,481; Referee: Dimitrios Kalopoulos

19 December 2009 15	Ergotelis	0 – 2	PAOK	Heraklion, Crete, Greece
16:45			Arabatzis 52'; Vieirinha 65'	Stadium: Pankritio Stadium; Attendance: 2,189; Referee: Stavros Tritsonis

6 January 2010 16	Panathinaikos	4 – 1	Ergotelis	Athens, Greece
16:45	Cissé 26', 66'; Karagounis 44'; Leto 90+2'		Fragoulakis 8'	Stadium: Athens Olympic Stadium; Attendance: 30,031; Referee: Michalis Tsiniaris

9 January 2010 17	Ergotelis	0 – 0	Panionios	Heraklion, Crete, Greece
16:45				Stadium: Pankritio Stadium; Attendance: 1,363; Referee: Michalis Dakos

16 January 2010 18	Skoda Xanthi	1 – 0	Ergotelis	Xanthi
19:00	Ellington 62'			Stadium: Skoda Xanthi Arena; Attendance: 879; Referee: Michalis Tsiniaris

23 January 2010 19	Ergotelis	1 – 0	Levadiakos	Heraklion, Crete, Greece
16:45	Orfanos 65'			Stadium: Pankritio Stadium; Attendance: 1,211; Referee: Stavros Tritsonis

31 January 2010 20	Panthrakikos	3 – 2	Ergotelis	Komotini, Greece
14:30	Kazakis 27'; Manú 53'; Arsenijević 86'		Orfanos 16'; Kordonouris 36'	Stadium: Komotini Municipal Stadium; Attendance: 2,269; Referee: Stavros Mantalos

7 February 2010 21	Ergotelis	4 – 3	Asteras Tripolis	Heraklion, Crete, Greece
14:30	Fragoulakis 7' (pen.); Budimir 12'; Hieblinger 28'; Beto 75'		Lazaridis 17'; Carrera 58', 64'	Stadium: Pankritio Stadium; Attendance: 1,092; Referee: Konstantinos Papastamatis

14 February 2010 22	Aris	2 – 1	Ergotelis	Thessaloniki, Greece
16:45	Koke 29'; Adu 45+1'		Beto 2'	Stadium: Kleanthis Vikelidis Stadium; Attendance: 9,258; Referee: Athanasios Giachos

20 February 2010 23	Ergotelis	1 – 1	Olympiacos	Heraklion, Crete, Greece
19:00	Budimir 85'		Torosidis 29'	Stadium: Pankritio Stadium; Attendance: 7,298; Referee: Ilias Spathas

27 February 2010 24	AEK Athens	1 – 0	Ergotelis	Athens, Greece
19:00	Djebbour 12'			Stadium: Athens Olympic Stadium; Attendance: 11,023; Referee: Michalis Dakos

7 March 2010 25	Ergotelis	1 – 1	Atromitos	Heraklion, Crete, Greece
14:30	Saganowski 82' (o.g.)		Sfakianakis 90+1'	Stadium: Pankritio Stadium; Attendance: 1,346; Referee: Petros Konstantineas

14 March 2010 26	AEL	1 – 0	Ergotelis	Larissa, Greece
16:45	Romeu 12'			Stadium: Alcazar Stadium; Attendance: 4,866; Referee: Konstantinos Papastamatis

21 March 2010 27	Ergotelis	1 – 3	Iraklis	Heraklion, Crete, Greece
19:00	Leal 14'		Roubakis 38' (o.g.); Iacob 65'; Papazaharias 87'	Stadium: Pankritio Stadium; Attendance: 1,146; Referee: Georgios Giannopoulos

28 March 2010 28	Kavala	1 – 3	Ergotelis	Kavala, Greece
19:00	Moore 33' (pen.)		Česnauskis 22'; Budimir 61'; Fragoulakis 81'	Stadium: Anthi Karagianni Stadium; Attendance: 1,305; Referee: Marios Labropoulos

11 April 2010 29	Ergotelis	3 – 1	PAS Giannina	Heraklion, Crete, Greece
19:00	Leal 36', 57' (pen.); Fragoulakis 88'		Arrache 49'	Stadium: Pankritio Stadium; Attendance: 1,179; Referee: Georgios Stathopoulos

18 April 2010 30	PAOK	4 – 1	Ergotelis	Thessaloniki, Greece
19:00	Sorlin 2'; Muslimović 10'; Cirillo 16'; Papazoglou 27'		Chrysofakis 46'	Stadium: Toumba Stadium; Attendance: 9,014; Referee: Konstantinos Papastamatis

== Greek Cup ==
=== Fourth round ===
==== Matches ====
Win Draw Loss

28 October 2009 Knockout match	Pierikos	2 – 2 (a.e.t.) (4 – 2 p)	Ergotelis	Katerini, Pieria, Greece
14:15	Tasidis 53'; Gougoulias 110'		Leal 90+1'; Shashiashvili 103'	Stadium: Municipal Stadium of Katerini; Referee: Michalis Tsiniaris
	Penalties
	Gougoulias (penalty missed); Penta (penalty scored); Martínez (penalty scored); Makris (penalty scored); Giazitzoglou (penalty scored)		Beto (penalty missed); Leal (penalty scored); Fragoulakis (penalty scored); Romano (penalty missed)

== Statistics ==
=== Goal scorers ===
No.	Pos.	Nation	Name	Super League Greece	Greek Cup	Total
10	FW	(Uruguay)	Sergio Leal	7	1	8
25	FW	(Croatia)	Mario Budimir	6	0	6
12	MF	(Greece)	Dimitrios Orfanos	4	0	4
31	MF	(Greece)	Michail Fragoulakis	4	0	4
9	FW	(Latvia)	Māris Verpakovskis	3	0	3
11	MF	(Brazil) (Portugal)	Beto	3	0	3
33	FW	(Lithuania)	Deividas Česnauskis	2	0	2
5	DF	(Austria)	Mario Hieblinger	2	0	2
37	DF	(Georgia (country))	Giorgi Shashiashvili	1	1	2
24	MF	(Greece)	Christos Chrysofakis	1	0	1
8	MF	(Argentina)	Diego Romano	1	0	1
6	DF	(Greece)	Panagiotis Kordonouris	1	0	1
15	MF	(Brazil)	Silva Júnior	1	0	1
-	-	-	Opponent's own Goals	1	0	1
TOTAL				37	2	39

Last updated: 20 August 2014
