= Mario Hieblinger =

Austrian footballer

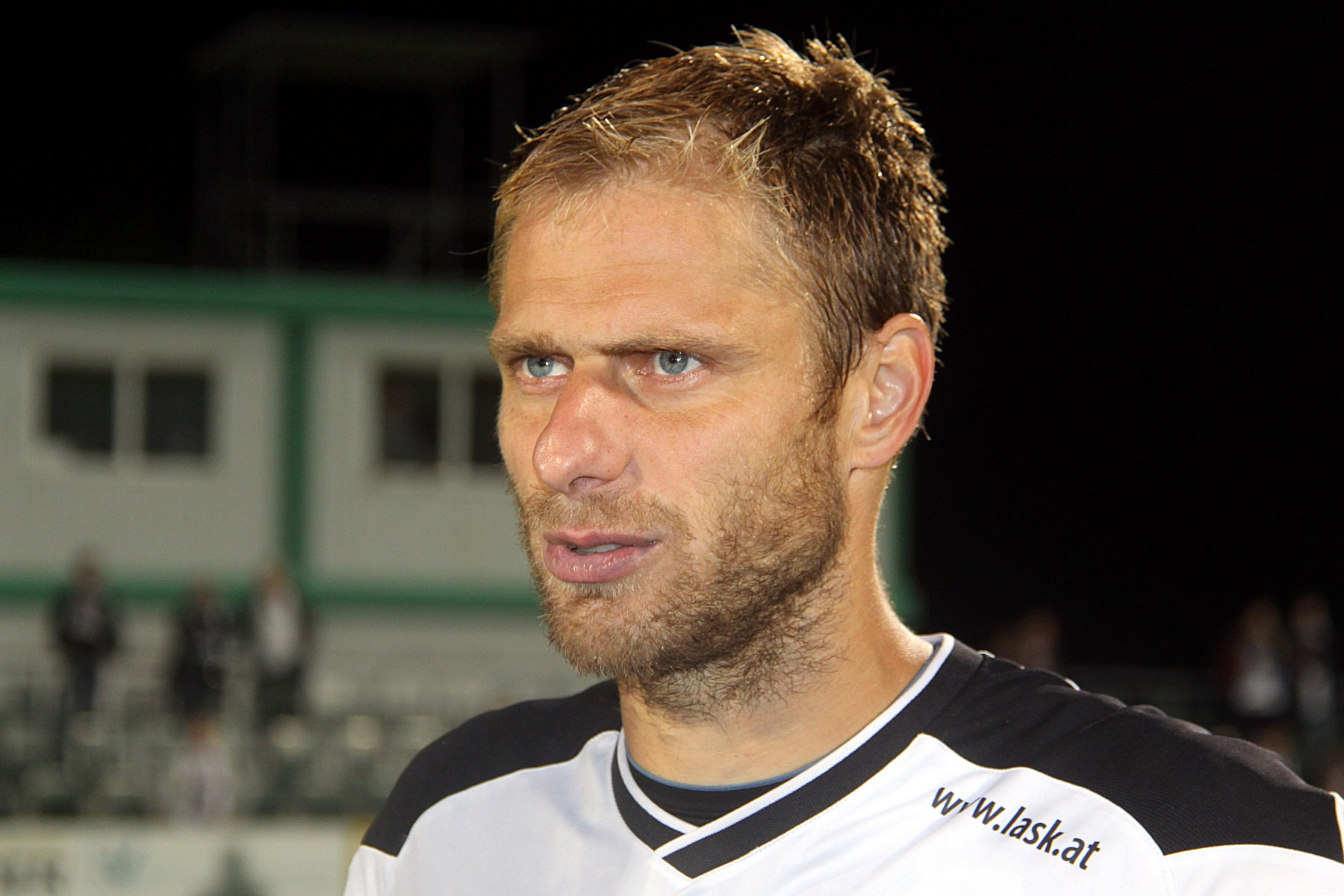

Personal information
- Full name: Mario Hieblinger
- Date of birth: 5 July 1977 (age 49)
- Place of birth: Mistelbach, Austria
- Height: 1.90 m (6 ft 3 in)
- Position: Centre-back

Team information
- Current team: Union Bad Hall (Manager)

Youth career
- Admira Wacker
- Stockerau

Senior career*
Years	Team	Apps	(Gls)
1996–2000	Admira Wacker	76	(1)
1996–1997	→ Stockerau (loan)	27	(1)
2000	Austria Salzburg	7	(0)
2000	Austria Salzburg II	1	(0)
2000–2003	Bad Bleiberg	83	(4)
2003–2005	Kärnten	70	(0)
2005–2006	Grazer AK	19	(1)
2006–2012	Ergotelis	149	(5)
2012–2015	LASK	84	(4)
2015	→ Pasching/LASK (loan)	1	(0)
2015–2016	Pasching/LASK	16	(2)
2016–2018	ATSV Stein	47	(4)
2018–2019	Amateure Steyr	26	(4)
2019–2022	Union Neuhofen/Krems	33	(2)

International career
1997–1999	Austria U-21	13	(0)
2003–2005	Austria	13	(0)

Managerial career
- 2013–2014: LASK (U18)
- 2015–2016: Pasching/LASK II
- 2015–2016: Pasching/LASK (assistant)
- 2016–2018: ATSV Stein
- 2018–2019: Amateure Steyr
- 2019–2022: Union Neuhofen/Krems
- 2022–: Union Bad Hall
- * Club domestic league appearances and goals

Mario Hieblinger (born 5 July 1977) is a retired Austrian football player who played as a centre-back, and current manager of Austrian side Union Bad Hall.

== Club career ==
Born in Mistelbach, Lower Austria, Hieblinger began his football career at SV Stockerau. His first professional contract was signed with VfB Admira Wacker Mödling, from where he moved to SV Austria Salzburg. After receiving limited playing time, he moved to the former Salzburg satellite club BSV Bad Bleiberg in the Austrian Football second division. After good performances, Hieblinger moved to FC Kärnten in the Austrian Bundesliga. While at Klagenfurt, Hieblinger became an international for Austria. Following FC Kärnten's relegation in 2004, he stayed with the Carinthians for one more year.

In the summer of 2005, Hieblinger was brought by Walter Schachner as a replacement for Mario Tokić to Grazer AK, but failed to meet high expectations. Therefore, during the summer transfer window of 2006, Hieblinger moved to newly promoted Greek club Ergotelis in the Greek Super League. During his time with Ergotelis, Hieblinger developed into a key player and one of the captains of the Cretans, and was considered among the best defenders in the league. In 2011, Hieblinger extended his contract with the club until June 2013. He made 149 league appearances for Ergotelis during a six-year span, all in the Super League, which makes him the player with the most caps in top-flight for the Cretan club (and third overall in professional league appearances, tied with former teammate Diego Romano).

In the summer of 2012, following Ergotelis' relegation to the Football League, Hieblinger moved back home to LASK Linz.

== Career statistics ==
As of matches played 17 January 2018

Appearances and goals by club, season and competition
Club	Season	League			Cup		Europe		Other		Total	
Club	Season	Division	Apps	Goals	Apps	Goals	Apps	Goals	Apps	Goals	Apps	Goals
FC Admira Wacker Mödling	1995–96	Austrian Bundesliga	1	0	0	0	—		—		1	0
Total			1	0	0	0	—		—		1	0
SV Stockerau	1996−97	Austrian First League	27	1	0	0	—		—		27	1
Total			27	1	0	0	—		—		27	1
FC Admira Wacker Mödling	1997–98	Austrian Bundesliga	32	1	3	0	—		—		35	1
FC Admira Wacker Mödling	1998–99	Austrian First League	34	0	1	0	—		—		35	0
FC Admira Wacker Mödling	1999–00	Austrian First League	9	0	0	0	—		—		9	0
Total			75	1	4	0	—		—		79	1
SV Austria Salzburg II	1999–00	Austrian Regionalliga West	1	0	0	0	—		—		1	0
Total			1	0	0	0	—		—		1	0
SV Austria Salzburg	1999–00	Austrian Bundesliga	7	0	3	0	—		—		10	0
Total			7	0	3	0	—		—		10	0
BSV Bad Bleiberg	2000−01	Austrian First League	31	1	2	0	—		—		33	1
BSV Bad Bleiberg	2001−02	Austrian First League	32	3	4	0	—		—		36	3
BSV Bad Bleiberg	2002−03	Austrian First League	20	0	2	0	—		—		22	0
Total			83	4	8	0	—		—		91	4
FC Kärnten	2002−03	Austrian Bundesliga	13	0	4	0	0 (Note: UEFA Cup)	0	—		17	0
FC Kärnten	2003−04	Austrian Bundesliga	21	0	2	0	1 (Note: UEFA Cup Qualification)	0	1 (Note: Austrian Supercup)	0	17	0
FC Kärnten	2004−05	Austrian First League	33	0	4	0	—		—		37	0
FC Kärnten	2005−06	Austrian First League	3	0	0	0	—		—		3	0
Total			70	0	10	0	1	0	1	0	82	0
Grazer AK	2005−06	Austrian Bundesliga	19	1	0	0	2	0	—		21	1
Total			19	1	0	0	2	0	—		82	0
Ergotelis	2006–07	Super League Greece	26	1	2	0	—		—		28	1
Ergotelis	2007–08	Super League Greece	28	0	0	0	—		—		28	0
Ergotelis	2008–09	Super League Greece	18	0	0	0	—		—		18	0
Ergotelis	2009–10	Super League Greece	24	2	1	0	—		—		25	2
Ergotelis	2010–11	Super League Greece	28	2	1	0	—		—		29	2
Ergotelis	2011–12	Super League Greece	25	0	1	0	—		—		26	0
Total			149	5	5	0	—		—		154	5
LASK Linz	2012−13	Austrian Regionalliga Central	24	2	3	0	—		2 (Note: Austrian First League Promotion Play-Offs)	0	29	2
LASK Linz	2013−14	Austrian Regionalliga Central	29	0	2	0	—		2	0	33	0
Total			53	2	5	0	—		4	0	62	2
FC Pasching/LASK Juniors	2014−15	Austrian Regionalliga Central	1	0	0	0	—		—		1	0
Total			1	0	0	0	—		—		1	0
LASK Linz	2014−15	Austrian First League	31	2	2	1	—		—		33	3
Total			31	2	2	1	—		—		33	3
FC Pasching/LASK Juniors	2015−16	Austrian Regionalliga Central	16	2	0	0	—		—		16	2
Total			16	2	0	0	—		—		16	2
Career total			533	18	37	1	3	0	5	0	578	19

== International career ==
Hieblinger made his debut for Austria on 22 March 2003 in a friendly match against Greece, which ended 2-2. He continued to receive caps for the national team under coach Hans Krankl even as a second division player. His last international game came during his time with GAK in September 2005, where he featured in a World Cup qualification match against Azerbaijan, which ended 0−0. In total, Hieblinger earned 13 caps for Austria.

== National team statistics ==
Austria national team
Year	Apps	Goals
2003	4	0
2004	5	0
2005	4	0
Total	13	0
