= Diego Romano =

Argentine footballer (born in 1980)

Personal information
- Full name: Diego Sebastián Romano
- Date of birth: 2 March 1980 (age 46)
- Place of birth: Rosario, Argentina
- Height: 1.65 m (5 ft 5 in)
- Position: Midfielder

Senior career*
Years	Team	Apps	(Gls)
2000–2002	Newell's Old Boys	1	(0)
2002–2003	Club El Porvenir	0	(0)
2003–2005	Tiro Federal	60	(8)
2005–2006	Club Almagro	0	(0)
2006–2007	Chacarita Juniors	32	(3)
2007–2008	San Martín (T)	36	(4)
2008–2014	Ergotelis	149	(18)
2014–2016	Iraklis	47	(5)
2016–2017	Apollon Smyrnis	23	(1)
2017–2019	Ethnikos Piraeus	14	(2)
2019–2023	Aris Voulas	18	(7)
- * Club domestic league appearances and goals as of 30 May 2017

Diego Sebastián Romano (born 2 March 1980 in Rosario, Santa Fe) is an Argentine former footballer who played as a midfielder.

== Club career ==
=== Early years ===
Romano began his career in Argentina, making one appearance for Newell's Old Boys in the Argentine Primera División during the Apertura 2000 tournament.

=== Ergotelis ===
On 25 June 2008, Romano signed a two-year contract with Greek Super League side Ergotelis. He went on to stay for six consecutive seasons with the club, featuring in 154 official matches and scoring 18 goals. During the 2011–12 season, Romano suffered an ACL rupture, thus being unable to help his club avoid relegation to the Football League after six straight seasons in the top flight. He was one of the few club veterans to follow Ergotelis in the Football League, captaining the club and leading them to instant promotion back to the top flight. In his final season with the club, Romano captained the team to its best-ever 7th-place finish in the 2013−14 Greek Super League. However, as the club's board of directors decided to cut down on the team's budget and offer key players new contracts with reduced pay, Romano decided to part ways with Ergotelis on 17 July 2014.

=== Iraklis ===
Four days after his release from Ergotelis on 21 July 2014, Romano signed a two-year contract with Greek Football League club Iraklis. He made his debut for Iraklis in a Greek Cup match against Lamia. Romano was joined by fellow countryman Emanuel Perrone, and the duo majorly contributed to Iraklis' return to the Greek Super League during the 2014–15 Football League season. After playing for Iraklis during the 2015–16 Super League season, both players mutually terminated their contracts with the club in May 2016.

=== Apollon Smyrnis ===
On 25 June 2016, Romano joined Football League club Apollon Smyrnis on a one-year deal until the summer of 2017. He once again helped his club earn promotion to the Super League, this time as division champions. He featured in 23 matches for Apollon Smyrnis, and scored one goal in his club's 2016–17 Football League championship run.

=== Ethnikos Piraeus ===
In July 2017, Romano signed with Gamma Ethniki side Ethnikos Piraeus.

== Career statistics ==
As of matches played 17 January 2018

Club	Season	League			Cup		Other		Total	
Club	Season	Division	Apps	Goals	Apps	Goals	Apps	Goals	Apps	Goals
Ergotelis	2008–09	Super League Greece	26	2	1	0	—		27	2
Ergotelis	2009–10	Super League Greece	24	1	1	0	—		25	1
Ergotelis	2010–11	Super League Greece	28	5	1	0	—		29	5
Ergotelis	2011–12	Super League Greece	8	2	0	0	—		8	2
Ergotelis	2012–13	Football League Greece	37	6	0	0	—		37	6
Ergotelis	2013–14	Super League Greece	26	2	2	0	—		28	2
Total			149	18	5	0	—		154	18
Iraklis	2014–15	Football League Greece	20	2	11	2	7 (Note: Football League play-offs)	0	38	4
Iraklis	2015–16	Super League Greece	20	3	4	0	—		24	3
Total			40	5	15	2	7	0	62	7
Apollon Smyrnis	2016–17	Football League Greece	23	1	3	0	—		26	1
Total			23	1	3	0	—		26	1
Ethnikos Piraeus	2017–18	Gamma Etniki Greece	14	2	—		1 (Note: Piraeus FCA Cup)	0	15	2
Total			14	2	—		1	0	15	2
Career total			226	26	23	2	8	0	257	28

== Honours ==
=== Club ===
Apollon Smyrni

- Football League: 2016–17

=== Individual ===
- Football League Best Player: 2012−13
