= Manolis Roubakis =

Greek footballer (born in 1979)

Personal information
- Full name: Emmanouil Roubakis
- Date of birth: 6 January 1979 (age 47)
- Place of birth: Heraklion, Greece
- Height: 1.78 m (5 ft 10 in)
- Positions: Full back; defensive midfielder

Youth career
- 1994–1998: Atsalenios

Senior career*
Years	Team	Apps	(Gls)
1998–2002	Atsalenios	6	
2002–2005	OFI	58	(1)
2005	Panathinaikos	4	(0)
2005–2009	OFI	98	(2)
2009–2012	Egrotelis	50	(1)
2012	Rouvas	12	(2)
2012–2013	Episkopi	18	(0)
2013–2014	Rouvas	22	(2)
2014–2023	Atsalenios	117	(26)
- * Club domestic league appearances and goals as of 18:08, 19 September 2016 (UTC)

Manolis Roubakis (Greek: Μανώλης Ρουμπάκης; born 6 January 1979) is a Greek former professional footballer who played as a full back. Despite being right-footed, his natural position is left back; however, he's comfortable playing in both flanks of the defence.

Roubakis spent the majority of his career at Crete-based clubs, with a brief six-month spell at Panathinaikos in Athens. He has appeared in over 200 Greek first division matches and he is one of the few footballers who have played for each of the three big clubs of Heraklion; OFI, Ergotelis and Atsalenios.

== Playing career ==
=== Early career ===
Roubakis was born in Heraklion, Crete and started his career at the youth academy of Atsalenios in 1994. In 1998, he made his debut with the first team in a Delta Ethniki match against AO Chalkida and since then he was considered an indispensable member of the local Heraklion club. He scored 4 goals for Atsalenios in the 2000–01 Delta Ethniki.

=== First tenure at OFI ===
In December 2001, Roubakis signed a 4-year contract with OFI in the Alpha Ethniki; however, he joined his new club in January 2002, as Atsalenios needed him to play in 4 additional Delta Ethniki matches. He made his league debut on 3 February 2002, in an away match against Ethnikos Asteras which OFI won 3–2, coming as a substitute for Manolis Dermitzakis in the 75th minute. By the time Roubakis left OFI three years later, he made a total of 58 league appearances for the club and scored the winning goal in a 2–1 away victory against Aris on 28 September 2003.

=== Move to Panathinaikos ===
In January 2005, Roubakis was transferred to Panathinaikos for a reported fee of about 200K Euros and he signed a contract until summer 2009. This move was welcomed as a "dream come true" by the player, himself reporting that Panathinaikos was the club he supported as a child – however, the fans of OFI had a different opinion, accusing OFI's board of dishonesty, as (according to the fans) the board members promised they would not sell Roubakis to Panathinaikos during the winter transfer period.

Roubakis never met Panathinaikos's expectations during his time there and only made 4 league appearances until the end of the 2004–05 season. Despite being eligible to play at the UEFA Cup, Roubakis was the only newcomer to not be registered for Panathinaikos' round of 32 match for the 2004–05 UEFA Cup against Sevilla CF. Moreover, after his fourth (and last) appearance for Panathinaikos on 27 February 2005 in a home match against Kerkyra, Roubakis was booed from the crowd due to his poor performance – he was substituted in the 51st minute by Panathinaikos manager Zdeněk Ščasný and never used again.

=== Return to OFI ===
Roubakis was eventually released from Panathinaikos and returned to OFI in July 2005, signing a two-year contract. He made 25 appearances in the 2005–06 Alpha Ethniki, a season which ended with mixed feelings for the team, as the top-half favorites only escaped relegation during the league's final matchdays.

After OFI's disappointing previous season, Roubakis vowed to never repeat the team's poor performance and he set the goal towards continental qualification for the following 2006–07 season. Roubakis scored a goal 46 seconds after kick-off in an away game against Iraklis and contributed to another goal in the same match, which ended in a 3–2 victory for OFI. He scored another goal on 17 March 2007 in an away game against Egaleo, after an assist by Joseph Nwafor. Roubakis finished the season with 26 appearances, with OFI qualifying for the 2007 UEFA Intertoto Cup after PAOK's refusal to take part in it.

Before the start of the 2007–08 season, Roubakis was linked to newly promoted Beta Ethniki champions Asteras Tripolis, but a move did not materialize – instead, he voted by his OFI teammates as third captain behind Goran Drulić and Pierre Issa. However, there was no smooth sailing both for OFI manager Reiner Maurer and Roubakis after a bad start in the league, with OFI fans demanding the resignation of the former and resenting the latter for poor performance and for joining rival Panathinaikos three years before. Despite this, Roubakis managed to make 25 appearances for the club during that season.

In 2008, Roubakis, after seven years at OFI and continuous appearances in the first team, was considered a key player for yet another season. Until the end of the 2008–09 Super League he earned 22 appearances to his name as well as OFI's only red cards for the season during 2 home matches against AEK Athens and Panathinaikos; however, OFI was relegated from the first division for the first time in 33 years.

=== Ergotelis ===
Roubakis signed a two-year contract with Ergotelis in July 2009. During his first season with Ergotelis, the club's manager Nikos Karageorgiou switched Roubakis' natural left back position to a defensive midfielder one, as he was trying to support fellow defensive midfielder Manoel Júnior – both coped well, leading the championship's steal charts. Roubakis finished the 2009–10 season with 24 appearances to his name, 23 of which as a starter, with Ergotelis itself narrowly avoiding relegation.

Roubakis was a regular starter at the club during the 2010–11 season as well, however a bad performance during a 1–4 home defeat against Panathinaikos briefly put teammate Tomasz Wisio in contention of the left back position. Despite that, Roubakis appeared in 26 league matches for Ergotelis for a grand total of 2226 minutes, and played his 200th first division match against Olympiacos Volos. Roubakis did not fit the plans of his manager, Nikos Karageorgiou, for the following season and as his contract was expiring in June 2011, he was released from the club.

=== Rouvas ===
After his Ergotelis contract was terminated, Roubakis struggled to find a suitable Greek or Cypriot club that would employ him – a return to Atsalenios in the Delta Ethniki or an early retirement were on the table. Finally in late January 2012, after months of inactivity, he signed a six-month contract for Gergeri-based Rouvas FC, a capture which was considered magnificent for a Football League 2 club. He made 12 league appearances for the club in the 2011–12 Football League 2 and scored two goals – one with an inswinging cross in a match against Kalamata and another against PAO Rouf.

=== Episkopi ===
In July 2012, Roubakis joined another Cretan football club, Rethymno-based Episkopi, which became Delta Ethniki Group 10 champions in 2012 and was promoted to the Football League 2 for the first time in history. In Episkopi, he reunited with former OFI teammate Thanasis Kolitsidakis, who was working there as the club's manager – however, despite 18 league appearances and the club gaining promotion to the following season's Football League, Roubakis did not renew his contract and was released in June 2013.

=== Second spell at Rouvas ===
Roubakis found himself a free agent yet again, and during the summer transfer period of 2013 he was rumored to join a number of clubs, but instead he decided to return to Rouvas one year after his departure. The previous year Rouvas had come from a successful Football League 2 campaign and expectations for this season were high – Roubakis himself made 22 appearances and scored 2 goals at the 2013–14 Football League 2 but could not help Rouvas avoid relegation to the local Heraklion championships as they only managed to finish 9th in Group 5. Roubakis was subsequently released from the club.

=== Return to Atsalenios ===
In July 2014, then 35-year-old Roubakis returned to his childhood club Atsalenios after 12 years. By that point, Atsalenios was playing at the A1 League of the Heraklion FCA championships (4th-tier level of Greek football) and his motivation was to help the club return to national level, as well as end his football career there – Atsalenios were also hoping for Roubakis to mentor the club's younger footballers with his experience and personality. Ultimately Atsalenios fell short of their goals in the league department as they were eliminated from the promotion play-offs after a surprise 3–1 semi-final defeat by underdogs Doxa Galia, but they managed to win the 2014–15 Heraklion FCA Cup with a 1–0 victory against Moires at the final; Roubakis gave the assist for the winning goal with a pinpoint cross.

Atsalenions renewed the contract of Roubakis at the buildup of the 2015–16 season, with the club considering him a valuable asset for their promotion battle. Atsalenios managed to stay undefeated during the group stage of the 2015–16 A1 League and during the promotion group stage they managed to earn ten victories without conceding a single goal; this earned them the A1 Heraklion FCA championship – at the end, Atsalenios won the Crete Champions play-off stage and were therefore promoted to the following season's Football League 2. Roubakis himself was key to Atsalenios' success as him and forward Tasos Triantafyllou made a formidable pair, with Roubakis getting assists and Triantafyllou scoring goals; in fact the latter became the league's top scorer with 28 goals and Roubakis getting one goal and 3 assists at the Crete champions stage alone and a total of 8 goals in the league overall.

Despite his advancing age, Roubakis vowed to help Atsalenios with the club's return to the Greek national leagues at the best of his abilities and aim for as high of a league position as possible at the 2016–17 Football League 2 – he was therefore awarded yet another contract extension. He contributed to Atsalenios' second consecutive Heraklion Super Cup victory with an assist at a 2–1 victory in the final against Irodotos.

== Outside football ==
On 7 November 2010, still a player of Ergotelis at the time, Roubakis was a candidate for the municipal council of Heraklion at the 2010 Greek local elections – he gathered 1054 votes in the 4th administrative division of the city but did not win a seat.
