= Georgios Siakkas =

Greek footballer

Personal information
- Date of birth: March 23, 1988 (age 38)
- Place of birth: Mitrousi, Serres, Greece
- Height: 1.82 m (6 ft 0 in)
- Position: Midfielder

Youth career
- 2003–2004: Thrakikos Ano Mitrousi

Senior career*
Years	Team	Apps	(Gls)
2004–2009	Panserraikos	27	(0)
2009–2011	Ergotelis	1	(0)
2011	→ Doxa Drama (loan)	16	(2)
2011–2012	Fokikos	13	(2)
2012–2013	Panserraikos	28	(0)
2013–2014	AEL	0	(0)
2014–2018	Panserraikos	103	(0)
2019–2020	Doxa Kato Kamila	20	(1)
2020–2022	Megas Alexandros Orfani		
2022–2023	Ethnikos Sidirokastro	5	(0)
2023–2024	Thrakikos Ano Mitrousi	12	(1)
2024–2025	Pythagoras Kala Dendra	4	(0)
- * Club domestic league appearances and goals as of 19:54, 21 April 2019 (UTC)

Georgios Siakkas (Greek: Γεώργιος Σιάκκας; born March 23, 1988) is a Greek footballer.

== Career ==
Born in Mitrousi, Serres, Siakkas began playing football with local side Panserraikos in the Beta Ethniki.
