= Michail Fragoulakis =

Greek footballer

Personal information
- Date of birth: 15 July 1983 (age 43)
- Place of birth: Heraklion, Crete, Greece
- Height: 1.77 m (5 ft 9 1/2 in)
- Position: Midfielder

Youth career
- –2004: OFI

Senior career*
Years	Team	Apps	(Gls)
2004–2006	OFI	0	(0)
2004–2006	→ Atsalenios (loan)	47	(13)
2006–2012	Ergotelis	133	(12)
2012–2013	Asteras Tripolis	25	(1)
2013–2014	OFI	12	(1)
2014–2015	Kissamikos	18	(2)
2015–2016	OFI	28	(3)
2016–2019	Irodotos	13	(1)
2019–2020	Giouchtas		
2020–2021	AO Poros		
2021–2022	Giouchtas		
2022–2023	Almyros Gazi		
2023–2024	Irodotos		

Managerial career
- 2024–2025: Irodotos (assistant)
- * Club domestic league appearances and goals as of 25 June 2019

Michail Fragoulakis (Greek: Μιχαήλ Φραγκουλάκης; born 15 July 1983) is a Greek former professional footballer who played as a Midfielder.

== Career ==
Born in Heraklion, Fragoulakis began his football career with the youth teams of OFI. He made his professional debut for local side Atsalenios however, on loan from OFI, spending 1,5 year in the Gamma Ethniki before being released from his contract after refusing a second loan spell deal with Kallithea. He then joined newly promoted local rival Ergotelis in 2006, seizing his opportunity to play in the Greek Super League. Within a span of six years, Fragoulakis featured in 133 official matches, scoring 11 goals for the club. At the end of the 2011–12 season he terminated his contract with the relegated Ergotelis to join fellow Super League side Asteras Tripoli and feature in the UEFA Europa League 2nd and 3rd qualifying rounds. At the end of the season, he was released by Asteras Tripoli and went on to rejoin his first club OFI, also a contender in the Greek Super League. His second spell at OFI however was abruptly terminated after a dispute with manager Gennaro Gattuso, who allegedly requested Fragoulakis and teammate Iosif Daskalakis to be expelled from the club. Following this dispute, Fragoulakis' contract was terminated and he went on to sign for Football League 2 side Kissamikos for six months, helping them achieve promotion to the Football League.

On 13 July 2015, Fragoulakis returned to OFI on a season-long deal, after the club declared bankruptcy and was willingly relegated to the amateur Gamma Ethniki division, the third tier of the Greek football league system. Despite Fragoulakis being a regular starter throughout the season (28 caps, 3 goals), which saw the club win the division title and achieve promotion to the Football League, his contract with the club was not renewed for the club's fresh start in professional competitions. Fragoulakis eventually signed with local club Irodotos, playing in the Heraklion FCA regional championship. He became an instrumental component in Irodotos' return to professional divisions, during which he celebrated 6 amateur titles within a span of two seasons.

== Honours ==
OFI

- Gamma Ethniki (1): 2015–16

Irodotos

- Heraklion FCA A1 Championship (1): 2016−17
- Heraklion FCA Cup (1): 2016−17
- Greek Football Amateur Cup (1): 2016−17
- Amateurs' Super Cup Greece (1): 2016–17
- Heraklion FCA Super Cup (1): 2017
- Gamma Ethniki (1): 2017–18
