= Sergio Leal =

Uruguayan footballer (born 1982)

Personal information
- Full name: Sergio William Leal González
- Date of birth: 25 September 1982 (age 44)
- Place of birth: Rivera, Uruguay
- Height: 1.81 m (5 ft 11 in)
- Position: Forward

Senior career*
| Years | Team | Apps | (Gls) |
| 2000–2006 | Peñarol | 36 | (10) |
| 2003 | → Plaza Colonia (loan) | 30 | (13) |
| 2005–2006 | → Sporting Cristal (loan) | 39 | (11) |
| 2006–2008 | USMP | 8 | (2) |
| 2007–2008 | → Gimnasia LP (loan) | 36 | (2) |
| 2008–2009 | Danubio | 24 | (9) |
| 2009–2012 | Ergotelis | 73 | (18) |
| 2012–2013 | Deportivo Cali | 11 | (1) |
| 2013–2014 | Danubio | 17 | (7) |
| 2014–2015 | Wuhan Zall | 24 | (11) |
| 2015 | PAE Kerkyra | 9 | (0) |
| 2015–2016 | Plaza Colonia | 18 | (3) |
| 2016–2017 | Ergotelis | 23 | (12) |
| 2017–2018 | OFI | 13 | (2) |
| Total | | 361 | (101) |

International career
| 1999 | Uruguay U-17 | 3 | (2) |
| 2004 | Uruguay U-23 | 2 | (0) |
- * Club domestic league appearances and goals as of 15 January 2018

Sergio William Leal González (Spanish pronunciation: [ˈseɾxjo leˈal]; born 25 September 1982 in Rivera, Uruguay) is a retired professional football player, who played as a forward.

== Club career ==
Leal emerged from the youth team of Uruguayan Primera División club Peñarol and started his professional career signing a contract with the club in 2001. In March 2003 he was loaned out to Uruguayan Segunda División club Plaza Colonia, remaining there until the end of the season. During his spell with Plaza Colonia, Leal played in 30 games and scored 13 goals. He then returned to Peñarol in 2004, featuring in 36 games for the Aurinegros and scoring 10 goals. In June 2005, Leal joined Peruvian club Sporting Cristal on a season-long loan, and was part of the Primera División Peruana winning squad of 2005. Leal contributed to the success by scoring 11 goals in 39 games, a feat which earned him the honor of Peruvian Best Player of the Year.

Seeking better economic and professional horizons, Leal announced his departure from Sporting Cristal in April 2006, and signed with fellow Lima-based club USMP in October 2006. Early in January 2007, Leal was loaned out to Argentinian club Gimnasia y Esgrima de La Plata, playing in the Primera Division de Argentina on a six-month loan deal. The loan was extended for another six months at the end of May 2007, after the request of Gimnasia coach Francisco Maturana, and once again for an additional year to include the 2008 Clausura, after the player publicly expressed his desire to stay at the club for another year. During his loan spell to Gimnasia La Plata, Leal featured in 36 games and scored 2 goals. Then, in August 2008, he returned to Uruguay and signed with Primera División side Danubio.

In the summer of 2009, Leal moved to Greece and signed a contract with Super League club Ergotelis. He stayed at the Cretan club for three years, during which he made a total of 73 appearances and scored 18 goals. After the club's relegation in 2012, Leal had a short spell at Colombian Liga Águila side Deportivo Cali, before returning to the Uruguayan Primera División and Danubio for the 2013–2014 season, in which he won the Apertura Championship.

In February 2014, Leal accepted a contract with Chinese League One side Wuhan Zall. He helped the club cling to a third-place finish at the end of the 2014 season, being the club top-scorer with 11 goals. Leal then left China and returned to Greece and the Super League, signing a contract with Kerkyra. Leal did not manage to make an impact in his second tenure in the competition however, and after having played 9 matches with Kerkyra, he terminated his contract and moved back to Uruguay, signing a contract with one of his earliest clubs, Plaza Colonia. In May 2016, Leal won his third title, the Uruguayan Primera División Clausura Championship, after Plaza Colonia defeated his former club Peñarol 2–1.

On 28 June 2016 and 4 years after his departure, Leal returned to Ergotelis, this time playing in the Gamma Ethniki, the third tier of the Greek football league system, and was instantly named captain of the squad that would attempt to restore the club's former Super League status. On 5 February 2017, Leal became second all-time top-scorer for the club in national divisions, surpassing former teammate Mario Budimir's 24 goals. He finished the season with 12 goals in 23 matches, greatly contributing to the club's promotion as Champions of the 2016−17 Gamma Ethniki Group 4.

As uncertainty struck Ergotelis due to a string of unsuccessful contacts with potential investors to secure the funds required to form a professional Football Club department eligible to compete in the Football League, Leal was eventually released from his contract with the club. After several weeks, he signed a one-year contract with his former club's local rival in the competition OFI, wishing to prolong his stay in Heraklion. He helped the club win the Division title, persevering after the departure of several key players due to the club's financial troubles, with 2 goals and six assists in 13 matches. After he was released from his contract by OFI, Leal decided to retire his playing career and pursue career in player management.

== International career ==
Leal has played for the Uruguay national under-17 football team in both the 1999 South American Under-17 Football Championship and the 1999 FIFA U-17 World Cup. In the U-17 World Cup, Leal was fielded in a total of three games, playing against Poland and New Zealand during the group stage, and vs. Ghana during the quarterfinals, scoring two goals.

In 2004, Leal was part of the Uruguay Olympic football team partaking at the 2004 South-American Olympic Qualifying Tournament, which was held in Chile. He played in two games under the instructions of coach Juan Ramón Carrasco, a 0–3 loss vs. Chile on 7 January 2004 and a 1–1 draw against Brazil on 11 January 2004, but scored no goals.

== Honours ==
Sporting Cristal

- Peruvian Primera División: 2005

Danubio

- Uruguayan Primera División: 2013–14 (Torneo Apertura)

Plaza Colonia

- Uruguayan Primera División: 2015–16 (Torneo Clausura)

Ergotelis

- Gamma Ethniki: 2016–17

OFI

- Football League: 2017–18
