= Manoel Júnior =

Brazilian footballer (born 1976)

Júnior
Personal information
- Full name: Manoel Oliveira da Silva Júnior
- Date of birth: 24 September 1976 (age 50)
- Place of birth: Paulista, Brazil
- Height: 1.75 m (5 ft 9 in)
- Position: Defensive midfielder

Team information
- Current team: Belo Jardim

Senior career*
Years	Team	Apps	(Gls)
2001–2002	Grêmio Inhumense		
2002	Garanhuense		
2002–2006	Paços Ferreira	111	(12)
2006–2012	Ergotelis	147	(14)
2012–2014	Panetolikos	56	(2)
2014	AEL	6	(0)
2017–	Belo Jardim	20	(0)
- * Club domestic league appearances and goals as of 22 July 2018

Manoel de Oliveira da Silva Júnior (born 24 September 1976) is a Brazilian professional footballer who plays as a defensive midfielder for Belo Jardim Futebol Clube.

== Club career ==
Júnior was born in Paulista, Pernambuco. In his country, he played for modest clubs Grêmio Esportivo Anápolis and Associação Garanhuense de Atletismo.

In 2002, at the age of 26, Júnior moved abroad and signed with F.C. Paços de Ferreira from Portugal, making his debut in the Primeira Liga on 25 August in a 3–1 home win against Varzim SC (90 minutes played). He suffered relegation at the end of his second season.

In 2005–06, Júnior scored a career-best nine goals in 33 games to help his team rank in 11th position, back in the top division. In the summer he joined Ergotelis F.C. in Greece, going to play in several Super League campaigns with the side and eventually reuniting with former Paços teammate Beto. He was released on 7 May 2012, at nearly 36.

In December 2012, Júnior moved to another club in the country, second-tier Panetolikos FC. He participated in 29 matches in his first year, which ended in promotion to the top flight.

Júnior moved to Greek division two side Athlitiki Enosi Larissa F.C. on 24 July 2014, leaving the following December. After nearly three years of inactivity, he returned to his homeland and signed with amateurs Belo Jardim Futebol Clube.
