= Iosif Daskalakis =

Greek professional footballer

Sifis Daskalakis
Personal information
- Full name: Iosif Daskalakis
- Date of birth: 7 August 1982 (age 44)
- Place of birth: Heraklion, Crete, Greece
- Height: 1.92 m (6 ft 3 1/2 in)
- Position: Goalkeeper

Senior career*
Years	Team	Apps	(Gls)
2003–2006	OFI	9	(0)
2006–2011	Ergotelis	87	(0)
2011–2012	Olympiacos	0	(0)
2012–2013	Veria	1	(0)
2013–2014	OFI	11	(0)
2015–2016	OFI	0	(0)
Total		108	(0)
- * Club domestic league appearances and goals as of 30 October 2025

Iosif "Sifis" Daskalakis (Greek: Ιωσήφ "Σήφης" Δασκαλάκης; born 7 August 1982) is a Greek former professional footballer who played as a goalkeeper.

== Career ==
Daskalakis began his career at his local side OFI, playing mostly as a back-up goalkeeper to Michalis Sifakis. He then moved to fellow Cretan Super League side Ergotelis, staying at the club for 5 years (the last 4 of which he was the starting XI goalkeeper) making a total of 90 appearances for the club. His steady performances with Ergotelis drew the attention of Greek champions Olympiacos, who signed Daskalakis in the summer of 2011 to be the back-up of Franco Costanzo. His spell with the Greek champions lasted one year, in which the club won the 2011–12 season double. Daskalakis made only a single appearance for the club during the season, as he ended up being back-up to third-choice keeper Balázs Megyeri, after Costanzo's contract was terminated.

In 2012, Daskalakis signed a contract with freshly promoted Super League side Veria, but was immediately sidelined after conceding two goals in his debut vs. his former club Olympiacos. He left the club in the summer of 2013, signing a three-year contract with his first club, OFI. His second spell at OFI however, was also abruptly terminated after a dispute with manager Gennaro Gattuso, who allegedly requested Daskalakis and teammate Michail Fragoulakis to be expelled from the club.

A year after his dispute with the club, Daskalakis returned to OFI in October 2015 signing a one-year deal, after the club filed for bankruptcy in 2015 and was therefore relegated to the Gamma Ethniki, the third tier of the Greek football league system. However, as the club signed experienced defenders Minas Pitsos, Kostas Kiassos and Ilias Kotsios in the winter transfer window of 2016, due to a limitation on the number of players over 33 years old allowed to play for a single club in the Gamma Ethniki, Daskalakis' was released by the club in February 2016.

== Honours ==
- Olympiacos:
  - Super League Greece: 2011–12
  - Greek Cup: 2011–12
