= Tomasz Wisio =

Polish footballer

Personal information
- Date of birth: 20 January 1982 (age 44)
- Place of birth: Lubin, Poland
- Height: 1.87 m (6 ft 2 in)
- Position: Defender

Youth career
- Zagłębie Lubin

Senior career*
Years	Team	Apps	(Gls)
1999–2000	Wisła Kraków	0	(0)
2000–2006	Pasching	116	(2)
2005	→ Arminia Bielefeld (loan)	1	(0)
2006–2007	Skoda Xanthi	15	(1)
2007–2009	LASK Linz	56	(2)
2009–2012	Ergotelis	43	(1)
2012–2013	RB Leipzig	14	(0)
2013–2017	SKN St. Pölten	87	(3)
2017	GKS Katowice	6	(0)
Total		338	(9)

International career
- Poland U16
- Poland U17
	Poland U21	4	(0)
Medal record
Men's football
Representing Poland
UEFA European Under-16 Championship
Runner-up	1999 Czech Republic
- * Club domestic league appearances and goals

Tomasz Wisio (born 20 January 1982) is a Polish former professional footballer who played as a defender.

== Honours ==
Poland U16

- UEFA European Under-16 Championship runner-up: 1999
