= Dimitrios Orfanos =

Greek footballer

Personal information
- Date of birth: 2 November 1982 (age 43)
- Place of birth: Athens, Greece
- Height: 1.88 m (6 ft 2 in)
- Position: Defensive midfielder

Youth career
- 1996–2000: PAOK

Senior career*
Years	Team	Apps	(Gls)
2000–2001	PAOK	2	(0)
2001–2002	Panserraikos	5	(0)
2002–2003	Kavala	29	(7)
2004–2007	Apollon Kalamarias	60	(6)
2007–2008	PAOK	5	(0)
2008–2011	Ergotelis	71	(8)
2011–2013	Panserraikos	3	(0)
2013–2014	Apollon Kalamarias	3	(0)
- * Club domestic league appearances and goals as of 17 July 2009

Dimitrios Orfanos (Greek: Δημήτριος Ορφανός; born November 2, 1982) is a retired Greek professional footballer.

== Career ==
Born in Marousi, Orfanos began playing football with PAOK. He played for several clubs before returning to PAOK in 2007 for one season. He retired from football in 2014.

He is the son of former Greek international player and fellow PAOK-player Kostas.

== Honours ==
PAOK

Greek Cup: 2000–01
