= Beto (footballer, born November 1976) =

Brazilian footballer

Personal information
- Full name: Gilberto Galdino dos Santos
- Date of birth: 20 November 1976 (age 49)
- Place of birth: Carpina, Brazil
- Height: 1.77 m (5 ft 9 1/2 in)
- Position: Midfielder

Youth career
- 1984–1994: Grêmio Petribu

Senior career*
Years	Team	Apps	(Gls)
1995	Grêmio Petribu		
1996	Limoeirense		
1997–1998	Recife		
1998	San Lorenzo		
1999	Rampla Juniors		
1999–2000	Recife		
2000–2004	Paços Ferreira	119	(4)
2004–2005	Beira-Mar	31	(6)
2005–2007	Benfica	30	(0)
2007–2008	Sion	32	(2)
2008–2012	Ergotelis	90	(4)
2013	Ypiranga–PE		
Total		302	(16)
- * Club domestic league appearances and goals

Gilberto Galdino dos Santos (born 20 November 1976), known as Beto, is a Brazilian retired professional footballer who played as a defensive midfielder.

He also held a Portuguese passport due to having spent many years in the country, where he even represented, amongst other teams, Benfica. Over the course of seven seasons, he amassed Primeira Liga totals of 180 games and ten goals.

== Club career ==
Born in Carpina, Pernambuco, Beto started his professional career in 1998, having unassuming stints in Argentina and Uruguay. After five years in Portugal with mid-to-bottom table Primeira Liga clubs F.C. Paços de Ferreira and S.C. Beira-Mar, excelling especially in the latter by scoring a career-best six goals in the 2004–05 season even though the Aveiro side ranked last, he signed a three-year contract with S.L. Benfica in early June 2005.

Despite not being a fans' favourite, Beto was often cast in the first team by manager Ronald Koeman. He appeared in 24 league games in his first year, playing the full 90 minutes in half of those. His greatest moment at the Estádio da Luz happened on 7 December 2005 when they defeated Manchester United 2–1 in Lisbon in a UEFA Champions League group stage fixture, sealing the passage to the round of 16 stage – he scored the decider at the 34th-minute mark, netting from outside the area.

Beto's second campaign in Benfica was less notable: with the departure of Koeman and the arrival of manager Fernando Santos and player Kostas Katsouranis (who played in his position), he was relegated to the substitutes bench, playing only six matches in that condition. Thus, he signed a three-year deal with FC Sion from the Swiss Super League on 11 June 2007.

Beto left Sion on 8 December 2008 and, earlier the following month, joined Greek club Ergotelis F.C. for one year. He left on 8 May 2012, aged nearly 36.

== Honours ==
Benfica

- Supertaça Cândido de Oliveira: 2005
