= Mario Budimir =

Croatian footballer (born 1986)

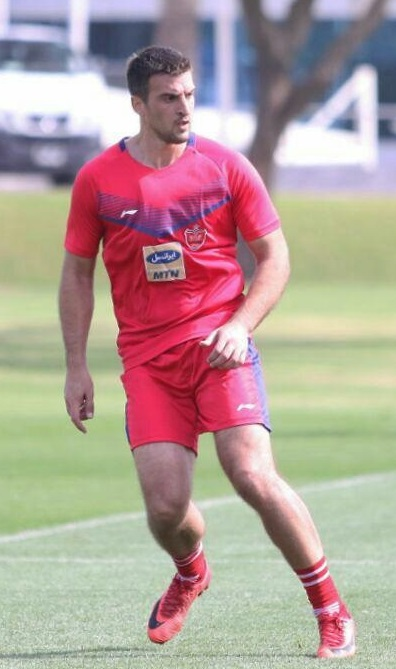
- Budimir in 2019 in Persepolis

Personal information
- Full name: Mario Budimir
- Date of birth: 12 February 1986 (age 40)
- Place of birth: Sinj, Croatia
- Height: 1.93 m (6 ft 4 in)
- Position: Striker

Youth career
- Tekstilac Sinj
- Junak Sinj
- Hajduk Split

Senior career*
Years	Team	Apps	(Gls)
2004–2006	Hajduk Split	2	(0)
2005	→ Uskok (loan)	13	(4)
2005–2006	→ Mosor (loan)	25	(3)
2006	→ Šibenik (loan)	8	(2)
2007–2012	Ergotelis	139	(24)
2012–2013	APOEL	30	(4)
2014	Panetolikos	9	(1)
2015–2017	Enosis Neon Paralimni	30	(9)
2017–2018	Rudeš	21	(15)
2018–2019	Dinamo Zagreb	11	(6)
2019	Persepolis	10	(4)
2019–2021	Lokomotiva Zagreb	28	(2)
2021	Al-Shoulla	2	(0)
- * Club domestic league appearances and goals as of 20:15, 19 May 2019 (UTC)

Mario Budimir (born 12 February 1986) is a Croatian footballer who plays as a center forward.

== Club career ==
=== Croatia ===
Budimir started his professional career with HNK Hajduk Split, in the season 2004–05. In January 2005, he was loaned from Hajduk Split to NK Uskok and in August 2005, he was loaned to NK Mosor. He started the season 2005–06 with Hajduk split (appearing in two matches), but he was loaned for the third time to HNK Šibenik in July 2006.

=== Ergotelis ===
On 10 January 2007, Budimir moved to Greece and signed a four-year contract with Super League side Ergotelis. He developed into the club's first choice striker under coach Nikos Karageorgiou, staying in Crete for six seasons, in which he appeared in 139 Super League matches and scored 24 goals. Until his departure in 2012, after the team was relegated to the Football League, Budimir had become the club's all-time top-scorer in the Super League, and ranked second all-time top-scorer in all domestic football competitions, behind former teammate Patrick Ogunsoto. Budimir still holds the record for most goals scored for Ergotelis in top-flight and as of 2017, ranks 4th in domestic league overall top-scorers for the club. His 139 Super League caps for Ergotelis also rank him third in top-flight appearances for the club (and 6th in domestic football competitions).

=== APOEL ===
On 4 July 2012, Budimir signed a two-year contract with the Cypriot club APOEL. At the end of the season he became a champion for the first time in his career after winning the 2012–13 Cypriot First Division with the club. During his spell at APOEL, Budimir appeared in 30 league matches and scored 4 goals. On 31 December 2013, APOEL terminated Budimir's contract with the club by mutual consent.

=== Panetolikos ===
On 7 January 2014, Budimir returned to Greece and signed a six-month contract with Panetolikos. He left the club in June.

=== Enosis Neon Paralimni ===
In January 2015, Budimir signed a six-month contract with Cypriot Second Division club Enosis Neon Paralimni rejoining his former coach at Ergotelis, Nikos Karageorgiou. He appeared in 10 matches scoring 7 goals, helping the club win the championship and gain promotion to the First Division. On 22 May 2015, it was announced that Budimir had extended his contract with the club.

=== NK Rudeš ===
Budimir moved to NK Rudeš in the summer of 2017, and impressed in his first season at the club, scoring 13 goals. However, following a dispute with his manager, he terminated his contract with Rudeš.

=== Dinamo Zagreb ===
On 30 April, Budimir reportedly completed a move to Dinamo Zagreb, signing on a one-year contract. Dinamo confirmed the move on 1 May, with Budimir set to wear the No. 9 shirt, previously worn by Ángelo Henríquez. Budimir scored on his debut for the club, on 4 May, in a 2–2 draw away at Slaven Belupo.

=== Persepolis ===
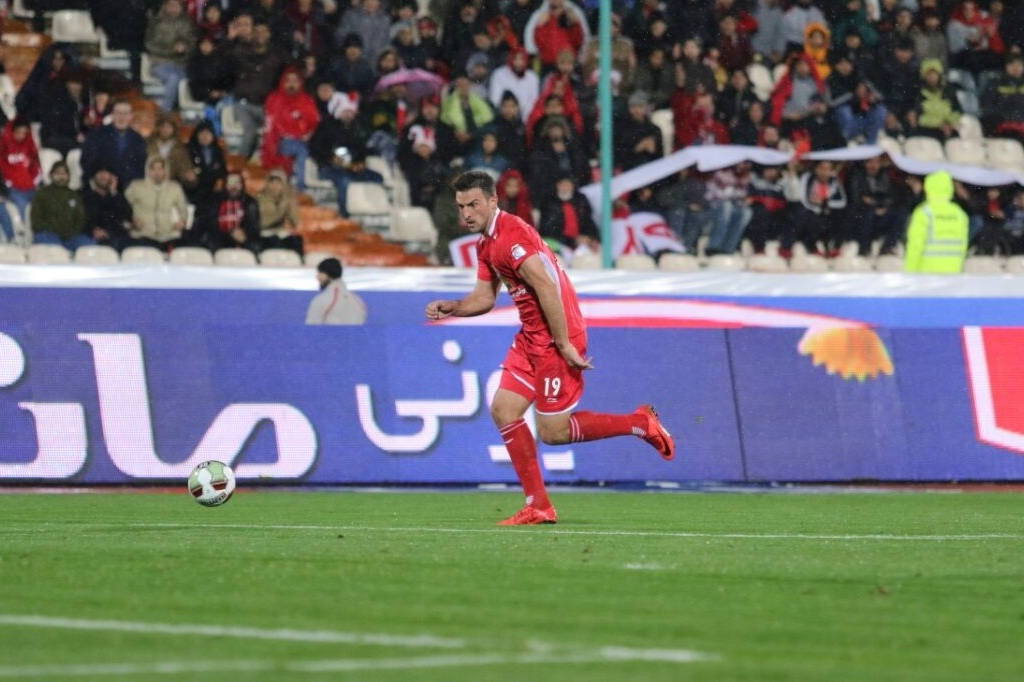
Budimir playing against Sanat Naft Abadan in 2019

On 28 January 2019, Budimir signed an eighteen-month contract with Persepolis FC. He made his debut for Persepolis against Sepidrood Rasht on 31 January 2019. Budimir scored his first goal for Persepolis in a 1–1 draw against Pakhtakor on 5 March 2019, In the 2019 AFC Champions League. Budimir finished the 2018–19 Persian Gulf Pro League at Persepolis with 1 goal from 10 appearances.

=== Lokomotiva Zagreb ===
He joined NK Lokomotiva on 6 July 2019.

== Honours ==
APOEL

- Cypriot First Division: 2012–13
- Cypriot Super Cup: 2013

Enosis Neon Paralimni

- Cypriot Second Division: 2014–15

Persepolis

- Persian Gulf Pro League: 2018–19
- Hazfi Cup: 2018–19
