= 2005–06 Ergotelis F.C. season =

PAE Lyttos Ergotelis
2005–06 season
- Chairman: (Greece) Georgios Soultatos
- Manager: (Greece) Manolis Patemtzis (5 April 2005 − 30 January 2006) (Greece) Nikos Karageorgiou (1 February 2006 − present)
- Stadium: Pankritio Stadium, Heraklion
- Beta Ethniki: 1st (champions)
- Greek Cup: Round of 16 (eliminated by Agrotikos Asteras)
- Top goalscorer: League: (Nigeria) Patrick Ogunsoto (21 goals); All: (Nigeria) Patrick Ogunsoto (23 goals)
- Highest home attendance: ~5,000 vs Kastoria (16 April 2006)
- Lowest home attendance: ~1,000 vs Haidari (24 October 2005); ~1,000 vs Paniliakos (26 November 2005)
| Home colours | Away colours | Third colours |

The 2005–06 season was Ergotelis' 76th season in existence, first season in the Greek Beta Ethniki following the club's relegation during last year's Alpha Ethniki, and 8th season overall in the competition. Ergotelis also participated in the Greek cup, entering the competition in the Third Round. The content of this article covers club activities from 1 June 2005 until 31 May 2006.

The club managed to win the Championship title for the first time in its history, thus achieving its first ever professional domestic title. Furthermore, Ergotelis impressed with their performance in the Greek Football Cup, where they managed to eliminate Greek giants Panathinaikos, advancing all the way to the competition's Round of 16 (fifth round) for the first time since the mid-80s.

== Players ==
Summer acquisition
Winter acquisition

| No. | Name | Nationality | Position (s) | Date of birth (age) | Signed from | Notes |
Goalkeepers
| 1 | Michalis Ximerakis | (Greece) | GK | 22 February 1975 (31) | (Greece) PANO Malia | |
| 22 | Michalis Zacharioudakis | (Greece) | GK | 15 July 1986 (20) | Youth system | |
| 30 | Zsolt Posza | (Hungary) | GK | 11 May 1977 (29) | (Hungary) Vasas | |
| N/A | Kostas Chaniotakis | (Greece) | GK | 9 July 1968 (37) | (Cyprus) APOEL | also, Goalkeepers' coach |
Defenders
| 2 | Alexandros Rizoulis | (Greece) | CB | 27 July 1983 (23) | | |
| 5 | Fragkiskos Economakis | (Greece) | CB | 19 January 1974 (32) | (Greece) AO Agios Nikolaos | |
| 6 | Panagiotis Kordonouris | (Greece) | CB | 8 November 1975 (30) | (Greece) Skoda Xanthi | On loan |
| 18 | Michalis Argyrakis | (Greece) | CB | 18 June 1980 (26) | (Greece) PANO Malia | |
| 21 | Dionysis Georgopoulos | (Greece) | CB | 12 June 1984 (26) | Youth system | |
| 25 | Charidimos Michos | (Greece) | RB | 15 March 1981 (25) | (Greece) Panachaiki | |
| 27 | Konstantinos Stavrakakis | (Greece) | RB | 6 September 1978 (27) | (Greece) OFI Crete | |
| 31 | Markos Gkiatas | (Greece) | CB | 20 March 1987 (19) | (Greece) Diagoras Rhodes | |
| 33 | Georgi Markov | (Bulgaria) | CB | 20 January 1972 (34) | (Bulgaria) Levski Sofia | |
| 34 | Nikos Papadopoulos | (Greece) | CB | 5 October 1971 (34) | (Greece) Apollon Kalamarias | |
| 82 | Paschalis Melissas | (Greece) | LB | 9 March 1982 (24) | (Greece) Skoda Xanthi | On loan |
Midfielders
| 4 | Labros Kefaloukos | (Greece) | DM | 31 March 1982 (24) | (Greece) OFI Crete | On loan |
| 8 | Nikolaos Tzanetis | (Greece) | CM | 27 April 1979 (27) | (Greece) OFI Crete | |
| 10 | Dimitrios Kiliaras | (Greece) | AM | 23 March 1986 (20) | Youth system | |
| 11 | Béla Kovács | (Hungary) | CM | 30 March 1977 (29) | (Cyprus) Alki Larnaca | |
| 16 | Evangelos Stathoglou | (Greece) (Germany) | DM | 19 October 1988 (17) | Youth system | |
| 19 | Georgios Savvidis | (Greece) | RM | 27 March 1974 (32) | (Greece) Kallithea | |
| 20 | Manolis Soutzis | (Greece) | CM | 8 July 1972 (33) | (Greece) EA Rethymniakou | |
| 74 | Daniel Kenedy | (Portugal) (Guinea-Bissau) | DM | 18 February 1974 (32) | (Cyprus) APOEL | |
| 77 | Rune Hagen | (Norway) | LM | 20 July 1975 (30) | (Norway) Herfølge BK | |
Forwards
| 9 | Patrick Ogunsoto | (Nigeria) | CF | 19 April 1983 (23) | (Cyprus) APOEL | |
| 14 | Dragan Načevski | (North Macedonia) | RW | 27 January 1980 (26) | (North Macedonia) Vardar | |
| 29 | Dimitrios Skouloudis | (Greece) | CF | 8 October 1987 (19) | Youth system | |
| 97 | Lucian Pârvu | (Romania) | RW | 14 June 1983 (23) | (Romania) Extensiv Craiova | |

=== The following players have departed in mid-season ===
| N/A | Nikolaos Chalkiadakis | (Greece) | CM | 4 May 1986 (20) | (Greece) Irodotos | Loaned out |
| 7 | Vasilios Goniotakis | (Greece) | CF | 29 November 1979 (26) | (Greece) PANO Malia | Transferred |

=== Out of Team ===
| 13 | Galin Ivanov | (Bulgaria) | CM | 6 April 1975 (31) | (Bulgaria) Marek Dupnitsa | Career-ending knee injury |

Note: Flags indicate national team as has been defined under FIFA eligibility rules. Players and Managers may hold more than one non-FIFA nationality.

| Head coach | Captain | Kit manufacturer | Shirt sponsor |
|---|---|---|---|
| (Greece) Nikos Karageorgiou | (Greece) Fragkiskos Economakis | (United Kingdom) Admiral | (Greece) Almaco Aluminum Systems (−21 November 2005) (Greece) OPAP (26 November 2005−) |

== Transfers ==
Winter Transfer Window

=== In ===
| Squad # | Position | Player | Transferred From | Fee | Date |
|---|---|---|---|---|---|
| 19 | MF | (Greece) Georgios Savvidis | (Greece) Kallithea | Free | 15 June 2005 |
| 30 | GK | (Hungary) Zsolt Posza | (Hungary) Vasas | Free | 3 July 2005 |
| 11 | MF | (Hungary) Béla Kovács | (Cyprus) Alki Larnaca | Free | 3 July 2005 |
| 6 | DF | (Greece) Panagiotis Kordonouris | (Greece) Skoda Xanthi | Loan | 3 July 2005 |
| 25 | DF | (Greece) Charidimos Michos | (Greece) Panachaiki | Free | 3 July 2005 |
| 2 | DF | (Greece) Alexandros Rizoulis | (Greece) Dotieas Agia | Free | 5 July 2005 |
| 7 | FW | (Greece) Vasilios Goniotakis | (Greece) PANO Malia | Loan return | 5 July 2005 |
| N/A | MF | (Greece) Nikolaos Chalkiadakis | (Greece) Irodotos | Free | 11 July 2005 |
| 4 | MF | (Greece) Labros Kefaloukos | (Greece) OFI Crete | Loan | 12 July 2005 |
| 14 | FW | (North Macedonia) Dragan Načevski | (North Macedonia) Vardar | Free | 14 July 2005 |
| 77 | MF | (Norway) Rune Hagen | (Norway) Herfølge BK | Free | 20 July 2005 |
| 33 | DF | (Bulgaria) Georgi Markov | (Bulgaria) Levski Sofia | Free | 21 July 2005 |
| N/A | MF | (Guinea-Bissau) (Portugal) Ednilson | (Portugal) Benfica | Free | 28 August 2005 |
| 74 | MF | (Portugal) (Guinea-Bissau) Daniel Kenedy | (Cyprus) APOEL | Free | 17 December 2005 |
| 27 | MF | (Greece) Konstantinos Stavrakakis | (Greece) OFI Crete | Free | 4 January 2006 |
| 82 | DF | (Greece) Paschalis Melissas | (Greece) Skoda Xanthi | On loan | 19 January 2006 |
| N/A | DF | (Greece) Ioannis Kiliaras | (Greece) Irodotos | Undisclosed | 25 January 2006 |
| N/A | GK | (Greece) Kostas Chaniotakis | (Cyprus) APOEL | Free | 27 January 2006 |
| N/A | MF | (Spain) Javier de Pedro | (Sweden) IFK Göteborg | Free | 9 February 2006 |
| 34 | DF | (Greece) Nikos Papadopoulos | (Greece) Apollon Kalamarias | Free | 7 March 2006 |

=== Promoted from youth system ===
| Squad # | Position | Player | Date | Signed Until |
|---|---|---|---|---|
| 29 | FW | (Greece) Dimitrios Skouloudis | 2 June 2005 | 30 June 2010 |
| 21 | DF | (Greece) Dionysis Georgopoulos | 13 June 2005 | 30 June 2010 |
| N/A | DF | (Greece) Georgios Apostolakis | 22 June 2005 | 30 June 2010 |
| 22 | GK | (Greece) Michalis Zacharioudakis | 23 November 2005 | 30 June 2010 |
| 16 | MF | (Greece) (Germany) Evangelos Stathoglou | 3 January 2006 | 30 June 2010 |

Total spending: ▼0,000 €

=== Out ===
| Position | Player | Transferred To | Fee | Date |
|---|---|---|---|---|
| MF | (Greece) Ilias Eleftheriadis | (Greece) PAOK | Loan return | 30 May 2005 |
| GK | (Greece) Manolis Makrydakis | End of career | − | 6 June 2005 |
| DF | (Greece) Nikolaos Sourgias | (Greece) Ionia 2000 | Loan | 11 June 2005 |
| FW | (South Africa) Clement Mazibuko | (South Africa) Mamelodi Sundowns | Loan return | 13 June 2005 |
| FW | (Ghana) Ishmael Addo | (Israel) Maccabi Tel Aviv | Loan return | 13 June 2005 |
| MF | (Ukraine) Andriy Gircha | (Ukraine) Dynamo Kyiv | Free | 13 June 2005 |
| DF | (Cameroon) (Romania) Nana Falemi | (Romania) Vaslui | Free | 13 June 2005 |
| DF | (Slovenia) Suad Fileković | (Belgium) Mouscron | Free | 13 June 2005 |
| FW | (Cyprus) Stefanos Voskaridis | (Greece) Veria | Free | 13 June 2005 |
| DF | (Greece) Andreas Skentzos | (Greece) Rodos | Free | 13 June 2005 |
| GK | (Greece) Kostas Chaniotakis | (Cyprus) APOEL | Free | 14 June 2005 |
| DF | (Greece) Charalabos Charalabakis | (Cyprus) AEP Paphos | Free | 14 June 2005 |
| DF | (Greece) Georgios Apostolakis | (Greece) Panthrakikos | Loan | 23 June 2005 |
| DF | (Greece) (Albania) Alkis Dimitris | (Greece) Veria | Free | 26 June 2005 |
| MF | (Greece) Manolis Spyridakis | (Greece) Kalamata | Free | 26 June 2005 |
| MF | (Greece) Stavros Labrakis | End of career | − | 27 June 2005 |
| MF | (Germany) (Greece) Lars Schlichting | (Cyprus) Ethnikos Achna | ▲€50,000 | 26 August 2005 |
| MF | (Guinea-Bissau) (Portugal) Ednilson | (Portugal) Benfica | Transfer Cancelled | 31 August 2005 |
| MF | (Guinea) Jean Marie Sylla | (Greece) Kallithea | Free | 17 September 2005 |
| DF | (Greece) Ioannis Kiliaras | (Greece) Irodotos | Loan | 25 January 2006 |
| MF | (Greece) Nikolaos Chalkiadakis | (Greece) Irodotos | Loan | 25 January 2006 |
| FW | (Greece) Vasilios Goniotakis | (Greece) Irodotos | Free | 25 January 2006 |
| MF | (Spain) Javier de Pedro | (Spain) Burgos | Free | 21 March 2006 |

Total income: ▲50,000 €
Expenditure: ▲50,000 €

== Managerial changes ==
| Outgoing manager | Manner of departure | Date of vacancy | Position in table | Incoming manager | Date of appointment |
|---|---|---|---|---|---|
| (Greece) Manolis Patemtzis | Sacked | 30 January 2006 | 3rd | (Greece) Nikos Karageorgiou | 1 February 2006 |

== Kit ==
2005−06

Supplier: Admiral
Sponsor(s): Almaco Aluminium Systems, OPAP

| Home | Away | Third | Home(2) |

Source: Patris newspaper

== Pre-season and friendlies ==
=== Pre-season friendlies ===
Win Draw Loss

| 30 July 2005 Friendly | Ergotelis (Greece) | 1 − 1 | (Greece) Episkopi | Heraklion, Crete, Greece |
| 18:00 | Savvidis 41' | Report | Siskakis 30' | Stadium: Pankritio Stadium, Training Ground |

| 3 August 2005 Friendly | AEL (Greece) | 2 − 2 | (Greece) Ergotelis | Larissa, Greece |
| 20:30 | Papakostas 35'; Aloneftis 42' | Report | Savvidis 22'; Načevski 50' | Stadium: Alcazar Stadium |

| 6 August 2005 Friendly | Pierikos (Greece) | 1 − 0 | (Greece) Ergotelis | Katerini, Greece |
| 20:00 | Theodoridis 57' | Report | | Stadium: Katerini Municipal Stadium |

| 8 August 2005 Friendly | Kastoria (Greece) | 2 − 1 | (Greece) Ergotelis | Kastoria, Greece |
| | Soultanidis 14'; Kiskampanis 66' | Report | Kovács 55' (pen.) | Stadium: Kastoria Municipal Stadium |

| 10 August 2005 Friendly | Agrotikos Asteras (Greece) | 2 − 2 | (Greece) Ergotelis | Evosmos, Thessaloniki, Greece |
| 18:30 | Kyzeridis 65', 74' (pen.) | Report | Kovács 15' (pen.), 35' | Stadium: Agrotikos Asteras Stadium |

| 17 August 2005 Friendly | Ergotelis (Greece) | 2 − 0 | (Greece) Asteras Rethymno | Heraklion, Crete, Greece |
| 18:00 | Soutzis 15'; Kefaloukos 88' | Report | | Stadium: Pankritio Stadium, Training Ground |

| 21 August 2005 Friendly | Ergotelis (Greece) | 8 − 0 | (Greece) Irodotos | Heraklion, Crete, Greece |
| 18:00 | | Report | | Stadium: Pankritio Stadium, Training Ground |

=== Mid-season friendlies ===
Win Draw Loss

| 2 September 2005 Friendly | Ergotelis (Greece) | 1 − 2 | (Greece) Olympiacos | Heraklion, Crete, Greece |
| 18:00 | Načevski 3' | Report | Georgatos 38'; Castillo 90+2' | Stadium: Pankritio Stadium |

| 8 September 2005 Friendly | Ergotelis (Greece) | 3 − 3 | (Greece) Rodos | Heraklion, Crete, Greece |
| 17:30 | Skouloudis 47'; Kovács 82' (pen.); Georgopoulos 90' | Report | Karkaletsis 30', 55'; Pligkos 70' | Stadium: Pankritio Stadium, Training Ground |

| 17 September 2005 Friendly | Ionia 2000 (Greece) | 1 − 4 | (Greece) Ergotelis | Chania, Crete, Greece |
| 18:00 | Petrakis 16' (pen.) | Report | Kovács 3' (pen.); Načevski 20', 22'; Pârvu 70' |

| 30 December 2005 Friendly | Ergotelis (Greece) | 3 − 0 | (Greece) Irodotos | Heraklion, Crete, Greece |
| 15:30 | Tzanetis; Soutzis; Rizoulis | Report | | Stadium: Pankritio Stadium, Training Ground |

| 3 January 2006 Friendly | OFI (Greece) | 1 − 2 | (Greece) Ergotelis | Heraklion, Crete, Greece |
| 15:00 | Triantafillou 90' (pen.) | Report | Ogunsoto 17'; Tzanetis 74' (pen.) | Stadium: Pankritio Stadium |

== Competitions ==
=== Overview ===
| Competition | Started round | Current position / round | Final position / round | First match | Last match |
|---|---|---|---|---|---|
| Beta Ethniki | 1 | 1st | 1st | 24 September 2005 | ? |
| Greek Football Cup | First Round | Round of 16 | Round of 16 | 31 August 2005 | 21 December 2005 |

Last updated: 24 April 2014

== Beta Ethniki ==
=== League table ===
| Pos | Team | Pld | W | D | L | GF | GA | GD | Pts | Promotion or relegation |
|---|---|---|---|---|---|---|---|---|---|---|
| 1 | Ergotelis (C, P) | 30 | 16 | 8 | 6 | 41 | 23 | +18 | 56 | Promotion to Super League |
| 2 | Kerkyra (P) | 30 | 17 | 5 | 8 | 38 | 26 | +12 | 56 | Promotion to Super League |
| 3 | Aris (P) | 30 | 14 | 12 | 4 | 33 | 17 | +16 | 54 | Promotion to Super League |
| 4 | Thrasyvoulos | 30 | 15 | 8 | 7 | 40 | 25 | +15 | 53 | |
| 5 | Veria | 30 | 10 | 11 | 9 | 28 | 27 | +1 | 41 | |

(C) Champions; (P) Promoted

=== Results summary ===
| Overall | | | | | | | | Home | | | | | | Away | | | | | |
| Pld | W | D | L | GF | GA | GD | Pts | W | D | L | GF | GA | GD | W | D | L | GF | GA | GD |
|---|---|---|---|---|---|---|---|---|---|---|---|---|---|---|---|---|---|---|---|
| 30 | 16 | 8 | 6 | 41 | 23 | +18 | 56 | 11 | 4 | 0 | 24 | 2 | +22 | 5 | 4 | 6 | 17 | 21 | −4 |

Last updated: 17 February 2014.
Source: Competitive matches

=== Matches ===
Win Draw Loss

| 24 September 2005 1 | Ergotelis | 1 − 0 | Aris Thessaloniki | Heraklion, Crete, Greece |
| 20:00 | Načevski 4' | Report | | Stadium: Pankritio Stadium; Attendance: 2,500; Referee: Konstantinos Papastamatis |

| 2 October 2005 2 | Ilisiakos | 3 − 2 | Ergotelis | Zografou, Athens, Greece |
| 17:00 | Kampas 37' (pen.), 76'; Kozanidis 51' | Report | Kovács 68'; Markov 90+2' | Stadium: Zografou Municipal Stadium; Attendance: 540; Referee: Stavros Georgopoulos |

| 9 October 2005 3 | Ergotelis | 2 − 0 | Olympiacos Volos | Heraklion, Crete, Greece |
| 16:00 | Ogunsoto 7'; Savvidis 74' | Report | | Stadium: Pankritio Stadium; Attendance: 2,350; Referee: Georgios Giannopoulos |

| 15 October 2005 4 | Ethnikos Asteras | 4 − 0 | Ergotelis | Kaisariani, Athens, Greece |
| 16:00 | Djebbour 22', 58'; Demba 56'; Paraskevaidis 62' | Report | | Stadium: Michalis Kritikopoulos Stadium; Attendance: 1,140; Referee: Georgios Zolotas |

| 24 October 2005 5 | Ergotelis | 2 − 0 | Haidari | Heraklion, Crete, Greece |
| 15:30 | Ogunsoto 47'; Kovács 70' (pen.) | Report | | Stadium: Pankritio Stadium; Attendance: 1,000; Referee: Ioannis Stavridis |

| 31 October 2005 6 | Kerkyra | 1 − 2 | Ergotelis | Kerkyra, Greece |
| 16:00 | Makris 65' | Report | Ogunsoto 37', 56' | Stadium: Kerkyra Stadium; Attendance: 693; Referee: Ioannis Gkountas |

| 6 November 2005 7 | Panachaiki | 0 − 1 | Ergotelis | Patras, Greece |
| 15:00 | | Report | Savvidis 7' | Stadium: Kostas Davourlis Stadium; Attendance: 2,217; Referee: Ioannis Porfiris |

| 13 November 2005 8 | Ergotelis | 0 − 0 | Proodeftiki | Heraklion, Crete, Greece |
| 15:00 | | Report | | Stadium: Pankritio Stadium; Referee: Christos Iatrakis |

| 21 November 2005 9 | Niki Volos | 1 − 1 | Ergotelis | Volos, Greece |
| 16:00 | Avramidis 28' | Report | Kefaloukos 45' | Stadium: Panthessaliko Stadium; Attendance: 1,884; Referee: Konstantinos Papastamatis |

| 26 November 2005 10 | Ergotelis | 3 − 0 | Paniliakos | Heraklion, Crete, Greece |
| 15:00 | Ogunsoto 25', 48', 51' | Report | | Stadium: Pankritio Stadium; Attendance: 1,000; Referee: Dimitrios Skourtias |

| 4 December 2005 11 | Thrasyvoulos | 1 − 0 | Ergotelis | Fyli, Greece |
| 14:45 | Aggos 90+3' | Report | | Stadium: Fyli Municipal Stadium; Referee: Nikolaos Tsakiridis |

| 11 December 2005 12 | Ergotelis | 2 − 0 | Panserraikos | Heraklion, Crete, Greece |
| 14:45 | Ogunsoto 35', 53' | Report | | Stadium: Pankritio Stadium; Attendance: 2,500; Referee: Vasilios Skoufitsas |

| 18 December 2005 13 | Kastoria | 0 − 1 | Ergotelis | Kastoria, Greece |
| 14:45 | | Report | Markov 43' | Stadium: Municipal Kastoria Stadium; Referee: Dimitrios Ntamposis |

| 8 January 2006 14 | Ergotelis | 0 − 0 | Veria | Heraklion, Crete, Greece |
| 14:45 | | Report | | Stadium: Pankritio Stadium; Referee: Spiridon Stathopoulos |

| 16 January 2006 15 | Ergotelis | 0 − 0 | Kalamata | Heraklion, Crete, Greece |
| 16:00 | | Report | | Stadium: Pankritio Stadium; Referee: E. Loukas |

| 23 January 2006 16 | Aris Thessaloniki | 2 − 1 | Ergotelis | Thessaloniki, Greece |
| 16:00 | Beniskos 15'; Papadopoulos 88' (pen.) | Report | Ogunsoto 18' | Stadium: Kleanthis Vikelides Stadium; Attendance: Behind closed doors Referee: Georgios Kasnaferis |

| 29 January 2006 17 | Ergotelis | 2 − 1 | Ilisiakos | Heraklion, Crete, Greece |
| 14:45 | Kordonouris 21'; Markov 90+9' (pen.) | Report | Makris 20' | Stadium: Pankritio Stadium; Referee: Dimitrios Ntamposis |

| 5 February 2006 18 | Olympiacos Volos | 1 − 1 | Ergotelis | Volos, Greece |
| 14:45 | Bwele 21' | Report | Kiliaras 77' | Stadium: Volos Municipal Stadium; Referee: Christoforos Zografos |

| 12 February 2006 19 | Ergotelis | 4 − 1 | Ethnikos Asteras | Heraklion, Crete, Greece |
| 14:45 | Ogunsoto 36', 54'; Melissas 42'; Markov 50' (pen.) | Report | Sialmas 87' | Stadium: Pankritio Stadium; Referee: Charalabos Karatzas |

| 19 February 2006 20 | Haidari | 0 − 2 | Ergotelis | Haidari, Athens, Greece |
| 14:45 | | Report | Ogunsoto 25', 29' | Stadium: Takis Charalambidis Stadium; Referee: Vasilios Argyropoulos |

| 27 February 2006 21 | Ergotelis | 0 − 0 | Kerkyra | Heraklion, Crete, Greece |
| 16:00 | | Report | | Stadium: Pankritio Stadium; Attendance: 4,000; Referee: Georgios Daloukas |

| 5 March 2006 22 | Ergotelis | 1 − 0 | Panachaiki | Heraklion, Crete, Greece |
| 15:30 | Ogunsoto 77' | Report | | Stadium: Pankritio Stadium; Referee: Symeon Paraskevas |

| 11 March 2006 23 | Proodeftiki | 1 − 2 | Ergotelis | Nikaia, Attica, Greece |
| 15:00 | Chaniotis 5' | Report | Soutzis 52'; Načevski 90+5' | Stadium: Nikaia Municipal Gymnasium; Attendance: 719; Referee: Avraam Emvraitzoglou |

| 19 March 2006 24 | Ergotelis | 1 − 0 | Niki Volos | Heraklion, Crete, Greece |
| 15:30 | Ogunsoto 63' | Report | | Stadium: Pankritio Stadium; Referee: Christos Iatrakis |

| 26 March 2006 25 | Paniliakos | 2 − 0 | Ergotelis | Pyrgos, Elis, Greece |
| 16:30 | Kakazoukis 10'; Mitrov 64' | Report | | Stadium: Pyrgos Stadium; Attendance: 157; Referee: Stavros Georgopoulos |

| 3 April 2006 26 | Ergotelis | 4 − 0 | Thrasyvoulos | Heraklion, Crete, Greece |
| 16:00 | Markov 23' (pen.); Načevski 50'; Ogunsoto 65', 66' | Report | | Stadium: Pankritio Stadium; Attendance: 3,250; Referee: Symeon Tsesmetzis |

| 9 April 2006 27 | Panserraikos | 1 − 1 | Ergotelis | Serres, Greece |
| 16:30 | Meijide 90+4' | Report | Ogunsoto 83' | Stadium: Serres Municipal Stadium; Attendance: 2,000; Referee: Dimitrios Kyrkos |

| 16 April 2006 28 | Ergotelis | 2 − 0 | Kastoria | Heraklion, Crete, Greece |
| 16:00 | Ogunsoto 21', 72' | Report | | Stadium: Pankritio Stadium; Attendance: 5,000; Referee: Stavros Tritsonis |

| 29 April 2006 29 | Veria | 1 − 0 | Ergotelis | Veria, Greece |
| 16:00 | Voskaridis 83' | Report | | Stadium: Veria Stadium; Attendance: 900; Referee: Symeon Spyrou |

| 14 May 2006 30 | Kalamata | 3 − 3 | Ergotelis | Kalamata, Greece |
| 15:30 | Miserdovski 25' (pen.), 60' (pen.), 80' (pen.) | Report | Kiliaras 9'; Skouloudis 15'; Savvidis 45' | Stadium: Kalamata Municipal Stadium; Referee: Stavros Georgopoulos |

== Greek Cup ==
=== Third Round ===
| Home team | Score | Away team |
|---|---|---|
| Polykastro | 0 – 5 | Ergotelis (Q) |

==== Matches ====
Win Draw Loss

| 31 August 2005 Third Round | Polykastro | 0 – 5 | Ergotelis | Kilkis, Kilkis, Greece |
| 17:00 | | Report | Ogunsoto 50', 54'; Načevski 58', 70'; Soutzis 72' | Stadium: Kilkis Municipal Stadium; Referee: Nikolaos Tsakiridis |

=== Fourth Round ===
| Home team | Score | Away team |
|---|---|---|
| Ergotelis (Q) | 1 – 0 | Panathinaikos |

==== Matches ====
Win Draw Loss

| 9 November 2005 Fourth Round | Ergotelis | 1 – 0 | Panathinaikos | Heraklion, Crete, Greece |
| 19:00 | Kovács 89' (pen.) | Report | | Stadium: Pankritio Stadium; Attendance: 10,930; Referee: Ioannis Tsachilidis |

=== Round of 16 ===
| Home team | Score | Away team |
|---|---|---|
| Agrotikos Asteras (Q) | 2 – 0 | Ergotelis |

==== Matches ====
Win Draw Loss

| 21 December 2005 Round of 16 | Agrotikos Asteras | 2 – 0 | Ergotelis | Evosmos, Thessaloniki, Greece |
| 14:30 | Tsouklis 21'; Kyzeridis 36' | Report | | Stadium: Agrotikos Asteras Stadium; Attendance: 1,000; Referee: Georgios Daloukas |

== Statistics ==
=== Goal scorers ===
| No. | Pos. | Nation | Name | Alpha Ethniki | Greek Cup | Total |
|---|---|---|---|---|---|---|
| 9 | FW | (Nigeria) | Patrick Ogunsoto | 21 | 2 | 23 |
| 33 | DF | (Bulgaria) | Georgi Markov | 5 | 0 | 5 |
| 14 | FW | (North Macedonia) | Dragan Načevski | 3 | 2 | 5 |
| 19 | MF | (Greece) | Georgios Savvidis | 3 | 0 | 3 |
| 11 | MF | (Hungary) | Béla Kovács | 2 | 1 | 3 |
| 10 | MF | (Greece) | Dimitrios Kiliaras | 2 | 0 | 2 |
| 20 | MF | (Greece) | Manolis Soutzis | 1 | 1 | 2 |
| 4 | MF | (Greece) | Labros Kefaloukos | 1 | 0 | 1 |
| 6 | DF | (Greece) | Panagiotis Kordonouris | 1 | 0 | 1 |
| 82 | DF | (Greece) | Paschalis Melissas | 1 | 0 | 1 |
| 29 | FW | (Greece) | Dimitrios Skouloudis | 1 | 0 | 1 |
| - | - | - | Opponent's own Goals | 0 | 0 | 0 |
| TOTAL | | | | 41 | 6 | 47 |

Last updated: 25 April 2014
