= 2006–07 Ergotelis F.C. season =

Ergotelis
2006–07 season
- Chairman: (Greece) Georgios Soultatos
- Manager: (Greece) Nikos Karageorgiou (1 February 2006 − present)
- Stadium: Pankritio Stadium, Heraklion
- Super League: 9th
- Greek Cup: Round of 16
Home colours	Away colours	Third colours

The 2006–07 season was Ergotelis' 77th season in existence, first season in the Super League following the club's promotion as champions of last year's Beta Ethniki, and second season overall in the competition. Ergotelis also participated in the Greek Cup, entering the competition in the Fourth Round. The club managed to achieve its pre-season goal to stay clear of relegation, finishing 9th overall and thus secured its participation in next year's edition of the top football competition in Greece. Furthermore, Ergotelis advanced to the Cup round of 16 (fifth round) for the second consecutive time before being eliminated by PAOK.

== Players ==
Summer acquisition
Winter acquisition

No.	Name	Nationality	Position (s)	Date of birth (age)	Signed from	Notes
Goalkeepers
1	Iosif Daskalakis	(Greece)	GK	7 August 1982 (24)	(Greece) OFI	
30	Zsolt Posza	(Hungary)	GK	11 May 1977 (30)	(Hungary) Vasas	
32	Nikolaos Soumoulidis	(Greece)	GK	5 March 1982 (25)	(Greece) Kavala	
Defenders
13	Nikos Zapropoulos	(Greece)	CB	22 July 1978 (28)	(Greece) Skoda Xanthi	On loan
5	Mario Hieblinger	(Austria)	CB	5 July 1977 (29)	(Austria) Grazer AK	
3	Markos Gkiatas	(Greece)	CB	20 March 1987 (20)	(Greece) Diagoras Rhodes	
24	Nikolaos Sourgias	(Greece)	CB	7 May 1987 (20)	(Greece) Ionia 2000	Loan return
6	Panagiotis Kordonouris	(Greece)	CB	8 November 1975 (30)	(Greece) Skoda Xanthi	Joined after loan
27	Lefteris Gialousis	(Greece)	CB	18 July 1985 (21)	(Greece) Irodotos	
20	Altin Haxhi	(Albania)	LB	17 June 1975 (30)	(Cyprus) Anorthosis Famagusta	
8	Paschalis Melissas	(Greece)	LB	9 March 1982 (25)	(Greece) Skoda Xanthi	Joined after loan
17	Darko Miladin	(Croatia)	RB	4 April 1979 (26)	(Croatia) Hajduk Split	
7	Konstantinos Stavrakakis	(Greece)	RB	6 September 1978 (27)	(Greece) OFI Crete	
Midfielders
16	Stefanos Maselis	(Greece)	CM	20 October 1988 (18)	Youth system	
73	Manolis Kastrinos	(Greece)	CM	3 October 1988 (18)	Youth system	
18	Daniel Kenedy	(Portugal) (Guinea-Bissau)	DM	18 February 1974 (33)	(Cyprus) APOEL	
15	Silva Júnior	(Brazil)	DM	24 September 1976 (30)	(Portugal) Paços Ferreira	
4	Labros Kefaloukos	(Greece)	DM	31 March 1982 (24)	(Greece) OFI Crete	Joined after loan
26	Ivan Tasić	(Serbia)	CM	8 May 1979 (28)	(Greece) Kalamata	
40	Guy Bwele	(Cameroon)	CM	26 February 1979 (28)	(Greece) Olympiacos Volos	
33	Miroslav Barčík	(Slovakia)	RM	26 May 1978 (29)	(Slovakia) Žilina	
10	Dimitrios Kiliaras	(Greece)	AM	23 March 1986 (21)	Youth system	
31	Michail Fragoulakis	(Greece)	AM	15 July 1983 (23)	(Greece) OFI	
Forwards
11	Oleg Yashchuk	(Ukraine) (Belgium)	LW	26 October 1977 (29)	(Belgium) Anderlecht	
23	Perica Ognjenović	(Serbia)	RW	24 February 1977 (28)	(Malaysia) Selangor	
14	Dragan Načevski	(North Macedonia)	RW	27 January 1980 (27)	(North Macedonia) Vardar	
9	Alexandros Kaklamanos	(Greece)	CF	20 May 1974 (33)	(Cyprus) APOEL	
21	Anastasios Thanos	(Greece)	CF	1 April 1984 (23)	(Greece) Proodeftiki	
19	Dimitrios Skouloudis	(Greece)	CF	8 October 1987 (20)	Youth system	
25	Mario Budimir	(Croatia)	CF	13 February 1986 (21)	(Croatia) Hajduk Split	

=== The following players have departed in mid-season ===
22	Michalis Zacharioudakis	(Greece)	GK	15 July 1986 (20)	Youth system

Note: Flags indicate national team as has been defined under FIFA eligibility rules. Players and Managers may hold more than one non-FIFA nationality.

Head coach	Captain	Kit manufacturer	Shirt sponsor
(Greece) Nikos Karageorgiou	(Portugal) (Guinea-Bissau) Daniel Kenedy	(France) Le Coq Sportif	(Greece) OPAP

== Transfers ==
Winter Transfer Window

=== In ===
Squad #	Position	Player	Transferred From	Fee	Date
20	MF	(Albania) Altin Haxhi	(Cyprus) Anorthosis Famagusta	Free	16 May 2006
26	MF	(Serbia) Ivan Tasić	(Greece) Kalamata	Free	17 May 2006
40	MF	(Cameroon) Guy Bwele	(Greece) Olympiacos Volos	Free	18 May 2006
N/A	MF	(Greece) Nikolaos Chalkiadakis	(Greece) Irodotos	Loan return	31 May 2006
1	GK	(Greece) Iosif Daskalakis	(Greece) OFI	Free	2 June 2006
13	DF	(Greece) Nikos Zapropoulos	(Greece) Skoda Xanthi	Loan	4 June 2006
21	FW	(Greece) Anastasios Thanos	(Greece) Proodeftiki	Free	4 June 2006
5	DF	(Austria) Mario Hieblinger	(Austria) Grazer AK	Free	4 June 2006
11	FW	(Ukraine) (Belgium) Oleg Yashchuk	(Belgium) Anderlecht	Free	26 June 2006
31	MF	(Greece) Michail Fragoulakis	(Greece) OFI	Free	3 July 2006
9	FW	(Greece) Alexandros Kaklamanos	(Cyprus) APOEL	Free	6 July 2006
15	MF	(Brazil) Silva Júnior	(Portugal) Paços Ferreira	Undisclosed	6 July 2006
32	GK	(Greece) Nikolaos Soumoulidis	(Greece) Kavala	Free	7 August 2006
33	MF	(Slovakia) Miroslav Barčík	(Slovakia) Žilina	Free	8 August 2006

=== Promoted from youth system ===
Squad #	Position	Player	Date	Signed Until
29	FW	(Greece) Dimitrios Skouloudis	2 June 2005	30 June 2010
21	DF	(Greece) Dionysis Georgopoulos	13 June 2005	30 June 2010
N/A	DF	(Greece) Georgios Apostolakis	22 June 2005	30 June 2010
22	GK	(Greece) Michalis Zacharioudakis	23 November 2005	30 June 2010
16	MF	(Greece) (Germany) Evangelos Stathoglou	3 January 2006	30 June 2010

Total spending: ▼0,000 €

=== Out ===
Position	Player	Transferred To	Fee	Date
MF	(Greece) Nikolaos Tzanetis	(Cyprus) Kinyras Peyias	Free	16 May 2006
MF	(Greece) Georgios Savvidis	(Greece) Ethnikos Asteras	Free	16 May 2006
DF	(Greece) Charidimos Michos	(Greece) Asteras Tripolis	Free	16 May 2006
DF	(Greece) Fragkiskos Economakis	(Greece) P.A.O. Krousonas	Free	16 May 2006
MF	(Greece) Manolis Soutzis	(Greece) Atsalenios	Free	17 May 2006
MF	(Bulgaria) Galin Ivanov	End of career	−	21 May 2006
FW	(Romania) Lucian Pârvu	(Romania) Universitatea Craiova	Free	21 May 2006
DF	(Greece) Michalis Argyrakis	(Greece) Kallithea	Free	30 May 2006
GK	(Greece) Michalis Ximerakis	(Greece) Mochos	Free	6 June 2006
DF	(Bulgaria) Georgi Markov	(Bulgaria) Lokomotiv Sofia	Free	21 June 2006
DF	(Norway) Rune Hagen	Free agent	Free	21 June 2006
FW	(Greece) Nikos Papadopoulos	(Greece) Agrotikos Asteras	Free	27 June 2006
FW	(Nigeria) Patrick Ogunsoto	(Belgium) Westerlo	Free	30 June 2006
MF	(Hungary) Béla Kovács	(Cyprus) Alki Larnaca	Free	30 June 2006
MF	(Greece) Nikolaos Chalkiadakis	(Greece) PANO Malia	Loan	30 June 2006
MF	(Greece) Dionysis Georgopoulos	(Greece) Panachaiki	Loan	30 June 2006
MF	(Greece) Markos Gkiatas	(Greece) Diagoras Rhodes	Loan	30 June 2006

Total income: ▲50,000 €
Expenditure: ▲50,000 €

== Kit ==
2006−07

Supplier: Le Coq Sportif
Sponsor(s): OPAP

Home	Away	Third

Source: Patris newspaper

== Pre-season and friendlies ==
=== Pre-season friendlies ===
Win Draw Loss

8 July 2006 Friendly	Ergotelis (Greece)	0 − 1	(Greece) Egaleo	Almyros, Volos, Greece
18:45		Report	Petropoulos 63'	Stadium: Almyros Stadium

22 July 2006 Friendly	Fortuna Sittard (Netherlands)	0 − 2	(Greece) Ergotelis	Sittard, Limburg, Netherlands
19:00		Report	Kiliaras 55'; Melissas 85'

23 July 2006 Friendly	Sporting Winterslag (Netherlands)	1 − 3	(Greece) Ergotelis	Sittard, Limburg, Netherlands
14:30	? 60'	Report	Kounenakis 55'; Thanos 65', 80' (pen.)

25 July 2006 Friendly	Fortuna Sittard (Netherlands)	0 − 5	(Greece) Ergotelis	Sittard, Limburg, Netherlands
17:00		Report	Kaklamanos 40'; Fragoulakis 50', 55'; Thanos 75'; Bwele 82'

27 July 2006 Friendly	VV de Lauwers (Netherlands)	0 − 5	(Greece) Ergotelis	Kerkrade, Limburg, Netherlands
19:00		Report	Skouloudis; Načevski; Thanou; Júnior

29 July 2006 Friendly	Jong PSV (Netherlands)	1 − 0	(Greece) Ergotelis	Sittard, Limburg, Netherlands
19:00	Velens	Report

2 August 2006 Friendly	Ergotelis (Greece)	2 − 0	(Greece) PANO Malia	Heraklion, Crete, Greece
19:00	Načevski; Yashchuk			Stadium: Pankritio Stadium, Training Ground

5 August 2006 Friendly	Ergotelis (Greece)	0 − 3	(Spain) Espanyol	Heraklion, Crete, Greece
21:00		Report	Julián 22'; Torrejón 44'; Luis García 67'	Stadium: Pankritio Stadium

9 August 2006 Friendly	Irodotos (Greece)	1 − 2	(Greece) Ergotelis	Heraklion, Crete, Greece
18:30	Matatis 28'	Report	Načevski 23'; Skouloudis 60'	Stadium: Nea Alikarnassos Municipal Stadium

13 August 2006 Friendly	Ergotelis (Greece)	1 − 0	(Greece) O.F. Ierapetra	Heraklion, Crete, Greece
19:00	Haxhi 26'	Report		Stadium: Pankritio Stadium, Training Ground
Note: Ended after 68 minutes, due to insufficient lighting.

=== Mid-season friendlies ===
Win Draw Loss

2 September 2006 Friendly	O.F. Ierapetra (Greece)	1 − 0	(Greece) Ergotelis	Ierapetra, Crete, Greece
	Muratović 75'	Report		Stadium: Petros Vouzounerakis Stadium

4 September 2006 Friendly	AO Chania (Greece)	0 − 2	(Greece) Ergotelis	Chania, Crete, Greece
		Report	Yashchuk 66'; Kefaloukos 85'	Stadium: Perivolia Municipal Stadium

== Super League ==
=== League table ===
Pos	Team	Pld	W	D	L	GF	GA	GD	Pts	Qualification or relegation
7	OFI	30	12	6	12	41	45	−4	42	Qualification for the Intertoto Cup third round (Note: PAOK turned down entry to the Intertoto Cup allowing OFI to accept the bid from Greece.)
8	Atromitos	30	10	10	10	40	44	−4	40	
9	Ergotelis	30	11	6	13	30	32	−2	39	
10	AEL	30	9	9	12	30	38	−8	36	Qualification for the UEFA Cup first round (Note: Larissa qualified for one of the four UEFA Cup spots based on their victory in the Greek Football Cup.)
11	Skoda Xanthi	30	8	12	10	24	22	+2	36	

Source: Super League Greece
Rules for classification: 1st points; 2nd head-to-head points; 3rd head-to-head goal difference; 4th decision match.

=== Results summary ===
Overall								Home						Away					
Pld	W	D	L	GF	GA	GD	Pts	W	D	L	GF	GA	GD	W	D	L	GF	GA	GD
30	11	6	13	30	32	−2	39	7	4	4	18	10	+8	4	2	9	12	22	−10

Last updated: 17 February 2014.
Source: Competitive matches

=== Matches ===
Win Draw Loss

20 August 2006 1	Ergotelis	1 − 1	Ionikos	Heraklion, Crete, Greece
19:00	Kiliaras 84'	Report	Kotitsas 41'	Stadium: Pankritio Stadium; Attendance: 4,150; Referee: Georgios Kasnaferis

27 August 2006 2	Skoda Xanthi	0 − 0	Ergotelis	Xanthi
19:00		Report		Stadium: Skoda Xanthi Arena; Attendance: 3,552; Referee: Athanasios Briakos

10 September 2006 3	Ergotelis	2 − 1	Panionios	Heraklion, Crete, Greece
21:00	Yashchuk 58'; Kiliaras 82'	Report	Pletsch 90+2'	Stadium: Pankritio Stadium; Attendance: 3,520; Referee: Vasilios Terovitsas

16 September 2006 4	PAOK	1 − 0	Ergotelis	Thessaloniki, Greece
21:00	Charalambidis 48'	Report		Stadium: Toumba Stadium; Attendance: 3,778; Referee: Giannis Stavridis

23 September 2006 5	Ergotelis	2 − 0	OFI	Heraklion, Crete, Greece
21:00	Melissas 20'; Načevski 78'	Report		Stadium: Pankritio Stadium; Attendance: 4,150; Referee: Christoforos Zografos

30 September 2006 6	AEK Athens	3 − 1	Ergotelis	Maroussi, Athens, Greece
21:00	Tőzsér 51'; Liberopoulos 61'; Lakis 85'	Report	Yashchuk 43'	Stadium: Athens Olympic Stadium; Attendance: 12,992; Referee: Anastassios Kakos

21 October 2006 7	Ergotelis	2 − 1	Iraklis	Heraklion, Crete, Greece
19:00	Kaklamanos 49'; Haxhi 86'	Report	Rivas 40'	Stadium: Pankritio Stadium; Attendance: 2,485; Referee: Vasilios Skoufitsas

28 October 2006 8	Olympiacos	1 − 0	Ergotelis	Piraeus, Greece
19:00	Rivaldo 59'	Report		Stadium: Karaiskakis Stadium; Attendance: 20,405; Referee: Lazaros Polatian

5 November 2006 9	Atromitos	2 − 1	Ergotelis	Peristeri, Athens, Greece
15:00	Doe 52'; Luciano 60'	Report	Kaklamanos 13'	Stadium: Peristeri Stadium; Referee: Georgios Daloukas

== Greek Cup ==
=== Matches ===
8 November 2006 Round of 32	Aiolikos	2–2 (a.e.t.) (3–4 p)	Ergotelis	Mytilene
14:00 EET	Mouratidis 23' (pen.); Manousos 58'	Report	Načevski 17', 21'	Stadium: Mytilene Municipal Stadium; Referee: Vasilios Skoufitsas (Athens)

21 December 2006 Round of 16	PAOK	1–0	Ergotelis	Thessaloniki
17:45 EET	Tsigas 55'	Report		Stadium: Toumba Stadium; Referee: Vasilios Pamporidis (Kilkis)

== Statistics ==
=== Goal scorers ===
No.	Pos.	Nation	Name	Alpha Ethniki	Greek Cup	Total

Last updated: 25 April 2014
