= 2004–05 Ergotelis F.C. season =

PAE Lyttos Ergotelis
2004–05 season
- Chairman: Georgios Soultatos
- Manager: Myron Sifakis (− 4 April 2005); Manolis Patemtzis (5 April 2005 −)
- Stadium: Pankritio Stadium, Heraklion
- Alpha Ethniki: 15th
- Greek Cup: Second Round (eliminated by Ptolemaida)
- Top goalscorer: League: (Nigeria) Patrick Ogunsoto (11 goals); All: (Nigeria) Patrick Ogunsoto (13 goals)
- Highest home attendance: 27,950 vs Olympiacos (20 February 2005)
- Lowest home attendance: 3,789 vs Apollon Kalamarias (19 December 2004)
- Average home league attendance: 9,982
Home colours	Away colours	Third colours

The 2004–05 season was Ergotelis' 75th season in existence and the club's first season ever in the Alpha Ethniki, later renamed Super League Greece. Ergotelis also participated in the Greek cup, entering the competition in the First Round. The content of this article covers club activities from 1 July 2004 until 31 May 2005.

Despite achieving notable victories over traditional Greek giants Olympiacos and PAOK, the team was relegated in the end of the season, finishing in the 15th place.

== Players ==
Summer acquisition
Winter acquisition

No.	Name	Nationality	Position (s)	Date of birth (age)	Signed from	Notes
Goalkeepers
1	Kostas Chaniotakis	(Greece)	GK	19 July 1968 (36)	(Greece) OFI	
19	Michalis Ximerakis	(Greece)	GK	22 February 1975 (30)	(Greece) PANO Malia	
22	Manolis Makrydakis	(Greece)	GK	22 February 1970 (35)	(Greece) Asteras Rethymno	
Defenders
2	Charalabos Charalabakis	(Greece)	CB	31 August 1980 (24)	(Greece) Egaleo	
5	Fragkiskos Economakis	(Greece)	CB	19 January 1974 (31)	(Greece) AO Agios Nikolaos	
6	Andreas Skentzos	(Greece)	CB	23 September 1972 (32)	(Greece) Aris Thessaloniki	
18	Michalis Argyrakis	(Greece)	CB	18 June 1980 (24)	PANO Malia	
28	Alkis Dimitris	(Greece) (Albania)	CB	23 September 1980 (24)	Youth system	
31	Markos Gkiatas	(Greece)	CB	20 March 1987 (18)	(Greece) Diagoras Rhodes	
36	Suad Fileković	(Slovenia)	LB	16 September 1978 (26)	(Croatia) Hajduk Split	
44	Nikolaos Sourgias	(Greece)	CB	7 May 1987 (17)	Youth system	
74	Nana Falemi	(Cameroon) (Romania)	CB	5 May 1974 (31)	(Romania) Steaua București	
Midfielders
8	Ilias Eleftheriadis	(Greece)	AM	31 March 1984 (21)	(Greece) PAOK	On loan
10	Stavros Labrakis	(Greece)	AM	26 February 1970 (35)	(Greece) AO Agersani Naxos	
13	Galin Ivanov	(Bulgaria)	CM	6 April 1975 (30)	(Bulgaria) Marek Dupnitsa	
15	Jean Marie Sylla	(Guinea)	LM	22 April 1983 (22)	(Guinea) Horoya	
20	Manolis Soutzis	(Greece)	CM	8 July 1972 (32)	(Greece) EA Rethymniakou	
21	Manolis Spyridakis	(Greece)	DM	25 May 1979 (25)	(Greece) AO Agios Nikolaos	
23	Andriy Gircha	(Ukraine)	CM	27 December 1985 (19)	(Ukraine) Dynamo-2 Kyiv	
24	Nikolaos Tzanetis	(Greece)	CM	27 April 1979 (26)	(Greece) OFI	
27	Dimitrios Kiliaras	(Greece)	AM	23 March 1986 (19)	Youth system	
30	Lars Schlichting	(Germany) (Greece)	DM	14 September 1981 (23)	(Greece) AO Tymbaki	
Forwards
9	Patrick Ogunsoto	(Nigeria)	CF	19 April 1983 (22)	(Cyprus) APOEL	
11	Lucian Pârvu	(Romania)	RW	14 June 1983 (22)	(Romania) Extensiv Craiova	
12	Clement Mazibuko	(South Africa)	RW	16 September 1977 (27)	(South Africa) Mamelodi Sundowns	On loan
17	Ishmael Addo	(Ghana)	CF	30 July 1982 (22)	(Israel) Maccabi Tel Aviv	On loan
77	Stefanos Voskaridis	(Cyprus)	CF	1 February 1980 (25)	(Greece) PAOK	

=== The following players have departed in mid-season ===
7	Vasilios Goniotakis	(Greece)	CF	29 November 1979 (25)	(Greece) Amateur OFI	Loaned out
14	Aleksandar Vuković	(Serbia and Montenegro)	CM	25 August 1979 (25)	(Poland) Legia Warsaw	Transferred

Note: Flags indicate national team as has been defined under FIFA eligibility rules. Players and Managers may hold more than one non-FIFA nationality.

Head coach	Captain	Kit manufacturer	Shirt sponsor
(Greece) Manolis Patemtzis	(Greece) Stavros Labrakis	(France) Le Coq Sportif	(Greece) Almaco Aluminum Systems

== Transfers ==
Winter Transfer Window

=== In ===
Squad #	Position	Player	Transferred From	Fee	Date
30	MF	(Germany) (Greece) Lars Schlichting	(Greece) AO Tymbaki	Free	2 July 2004
8	MF	(Greece) Ilias Eleftheriadis	(Greece) PAOK	Loan	14 July 2004
6	DF	(Greece) Andreas Skentzos	(Greece) Aris	Free	14 July 2004
1	GK	(Greece) Kostas Chaniotakis	(Greece) OFI	Free	14 July 2004
77	FW	(Cyprus) Stefanos Voskaridis	(Greece) PAOK	Free	19 July 2004
14	MF	(Serbia and Montenegro) Aleksandar Vuković	(Poland) Legia Warsaw	Free	31 July 2004
23	MF	(Ukraine) Andriy Gircha	(Ukraine) Dynamo-2 Kyiv	Free	31 July 2004
13	MF	(Bulgaria) Galin Ivanov	(Bulgaria) Marek Dupnitsa	Free	2 August 2004
N/A	DF	(Albania) Nevil Dede	(Albania) Elbasani	Free	28 December 2004
17	FW	(Ghana) Ishmael Addo	(Israel) Maccabi Tel Aviv	▼€69,800 (Loan)	12 January 2005
12	FW	(South Africa) Clement Mazibuko	(South Africa) Mamelodi Sundowns	▼€100,200 (Loan)	27 January 2005
74	DF	(Cameroon) (Romania) Nana Falemi	(Romania) Steaua București	Free	28 January 2005
36	DF	(Slovenia) Suad Fileković	(Croatia) Hajduk Split	Free	31 January 2005

Total spending: ▼€170,000

=== Out ===
Position	Player	Transferred To	Fee	Date
DF	(Bulgaria) Marian Gospodinov	(Greece) Kalamata	Free	July 2004
MF	(Greece) Antonis Apostolakis	(Greece) PANO Malia	Free	July 2004
MF	(Greece) Nikolaos Karvelas	(Greece) Atsalenios	Free	July 2004
MF	(Greece) Christoforos Andriadakis	(Greece) Asteras Tripolis	Free	July 2004
DF	(Greece) Manolis Polemarchakis	(Greece) Atsalenios	Free	July 2004
GK	(Greece) Antonis Konstantoulakis	(Greece) AO Tymbaki	Free	July 2004
MF	(Serbia and Montenegro) Aleksandar Vukovic	(Poland) Legia Warsaw	Free	7 January 2005
DF	(Albania) Nevil Dede	(Albania) Elbasani	Transfer Cancelled	25 January 2005
MF	(Greece) Vasilios Goniotakis	(Greece) PANO Malia	Loan	29 January 2005

Total income: ▲€0.000

Expenditure: ▼€170.000

== Managerial changes ==
Outgoing manager	Manner of departure	Date of vacancy	Position in table	Incoming manager	Date of appointment
(Greece) Myron Sifakis	Sacked	4 April 2005	15th	(Greece) Manolis Patemtzis	5 April 2005

== Kit ==
2004−05

Supplier: Le Coq Sportif
Sponsor(s): Almaco Aluminium Systems

Home	Away	Third	Away(2)

Source: Patris.gr Archive

== Pre-season and friendlies ==
=== Pre-season friendlies ===
Win Draw Loss

30 July 2004 Friendly	Väsby United (Sweden)	0 − 1	(Greece) Ergotelis	Stockholm, Sweden
19:00		Report	Dimitris 28'

3 August 2004 Friendly	Enköping (Sweden)	2 − 1	(Greece) Ergotelis	Enköping, Sweden
18:00	Amstrong 25', 85'	Report	Goniotakis 69'	Stadium: Enavallen

5 August 2004 Friendly	Elche (Spain)	3 − 0	(Greece) Ergotelis	Elche, Spain
22:30	Nino ?', ?' (pen.); Moisés ?'	Report		Stadium: Estadio Manuel Martínez Valero

10 August 2004 Friendly	Valsta Syrianska (Sweden)	1 − 1	(Greece) Ergotelis	Märsta, Stockholm, Sweden
17:00	Nilsson 40'	Report	Goniotakis 35'	Stadium: Midgårdsvallen

11 August 2004 Friendly	Akropolis (Sweden)	0 − 7	(Greece) Ergotelis	Akalla, Stockholm, Sweden
		Report	Labrakis 10'; Goniotakis 25', 30'; Tzanetis 39'; Pârvu 55' (pen.); Schlichting 77'; Skouloudis 80'	Stadium: Akalla BP

18 August 2004 Friendly	Irodotos (Greece)	0 − 6	(Greece) Ergotelis	Nea Alikarnassos, Heraklion, Greece
18:00		Report	Spiridakis 12'; Tzanetis 39', 45'; Pârvu 49', 81' (pen.); Kiliaras 69'	Stadium: Nea Alikarnassos Municipal Stadium

21 August 2004 Friendly	PANO Malia (Greece)	1 − 3	(Greece) Ergotelis	Malia, Crete, Greece
18:00	Tsafantakis 14'	Report	Tzanetis 8'; Goniotakis 48'; Pârvu 78'	Stadium: Malia Municipal Stadium

28 August 2004 Friendly	Korakas (Greece)	1 − 3	(Greece) Ergotelis	Messara, Crete, Greece
17:00	Moraitakis 36'	Report	Spiridakis 4'; Tzanetis 11'; Vuković 53'	Stadium: Pompia Stadium

8 September 2004 Friendly	Ergotelis (Greece)	4 − 0	(Greece) Irodotos	Anopoli, Gouves, Greece
17:30	Ogunsoto 12'; Pârvu 43'; Voskaridis 66', 82'	Report

== Competitions ==
=== Overview ===
Competition	Started round	Current position / round	Final position / round	First match	Last match
Alpha Ethniki	1	15th	15th	18 September 2004	25 May 2005
Greek Football Cup	First Round	Second Round	Second Round	11 September 2004	11 January 2005

Last updated: 24 April 2014

== Alpha Ethniki ==
=== League table ===
Pos	Team	Pld	W	D	L	GF	GA	GD	Pts	Qualification or relegation
12	Apollon Kalamarias	30	8	9	13	31	49	−18	33	
13	OFI	30	8	8	14	36	44	−8	32	
14	Aris (Note: Aris had three points deducted for the incidents in the match against Iraklis in the matchday 29.) (R)	30	5	13	12	26	37	−11	25	UEFA Cup first round and relegation to Beta Ethniki (Note: Aris were qualified for the 2005–06 UEFA Cup as runners-up of the Greek Football Cup.)
15	Ergotelis (R)	30	5	5	20	19	50	−31	20	Relegation to Beta Ethniki
16	Kerkyra (R)	30	3	8	19	21	49	−28	17	Relegation to Beta Ethniki

Source: Galanis Sports Data
Rules for classification: 1st points; 2nd head-to-head points; 3rd head-to-head goal difference; 4th decision match.
(R) Relegated

=== Results summary ===
Overall								Home						Away					
Pld	W	D	L	GF	GA	GD	Pts	W	D	L	GF	GA	GD	W	D	L	GF	GA	GD
30	5	5	20	19	50	−31	20	3	4	8	15	22	−7	2	1	12	4	28	−24

Last updated: 17 February 2014.
Source: Competitive matches

=== Matches ===
Win Draw Loss

18 September 2004 1	Ergotelis	0 – 1	Iraklis	Heraklion, Crete, Greece
19:00		Report	Murati 71'	Stadium: Pankritio Stadium; Attendance: 9,250; Referee: Georgios Douros

26 September 2004 2	Kallithea	3 – 0	Ergotelis	Kallithea, Athens, Greece
16:45	Dragicevic 31'; Gekas 35'; Karatzas 60'	Report		Stadium: Gregoris Lambrakis Stadium; Attendance: 974; Referee: Spiros Vasiliou

3 October 2004 3	Ergotelis	1 – 1	Aris	Heraklion, Crete, Greece
18:15	Pârvu 16'	Report	Ogunsoto 13' (o.g.)	Stadium: Pankritio Stadium; Attendance: 8,852; Referee: Iraklis Tsikinis

16 October 2004 4	Olympiacos	2 – 0	Ergotelis	Pireus, Greece
18:00	Georgiadis 40'; Anatolakis 68'	Report		Stadium: Georgios Karaiskakis Stadium; Attendance: 26,141; Referee: Anastassios Kakos

23 October 2004 5	Skoda Xanthi	3 – 0	Ergotelis	Xanthi
15:30	Luciano 7', 39'; Zografakis 86'	Report		Stadium: Skoda Xanthi Arena; Attendance: 2,576; Referee: Dimitrios Styliaras

31 October 2004 6	Ergotelis	1 – 1	Chalkidona	Heraklion, Crete, Greece
15:00	Ogunsoto 90+1'	Report	Dimos 55'	Stadium: Pankritio Stadium; Attendance: 7,450; Referee: Christoforos Zografos

7 November 2004 7	PAOK	0 – 2	Ergotelis	Thessaloniki, Greece
17:00		Report	Ogunsoto 63', 78'	Stadium: Toumba Stadium; Attendance: 1,561; Referee: Kostas Finokaliotis

21 November 2004 8	Ergotelis	0 – 1	AEK Athens	Heraklion, Crete, Greece
17:00		Report	Katsouranis 75'	Stadium: Pankritio Stadium; Attendance: 16,850; Referee: Dimitrios Kalopoulos

27 November 2004 9	OFI	5 – 0	Ergotelis	Heraklion, Crete, Greece
17:00	Nwafor 36', 59'; Ogunsoto 40' (o.g.); Machlas 45+1', 69'	Report		Stadium: Theodoros Vardinogiannis Stadium; Attendance: 3,816; Referee: Giannis Kaminaris

5 December 2004 10	Ergotelis	2 – 3	Ionikos	Heraklion, Crete, Greece
14:45	Ogunsoto 40', 86'	Report	Gavrilopoulos 3'; Makor 5', 84'	Stadium: Pankritio Stadium; Attendance: 4,455; Referee: Georgios Douros

12 December 2004 11	Panathinaikos	1 – 0	Ergotelis	Athens, Greece
19:00	Konstantinou 90'	Report		Stadium: Leoforos Alexandras Stadium; Attendance: 8,720; Referee: Mpampis Karatzas

19 December 2004 12	Ergotelis	4 – 1	Apollon Kalamarias	Heraklion, Crete, Greece
14:45	Ogunsoto 46', 58', 83'; Labrakis 51' (pen.)	Report	Cleyton 66' (pen.)	Stadium: Pankritio Stadium; Attendance: 3,789; Referee: Giannis Tsachilidis

29 December 2004 13	Ergotelis	2 – 1	Egaleo	Heraklion, Crete, Greece
16:30	Eleftheriadis 5'; Labrakis 53' (pen.)	Report	Nikolopoulos 87'	Stadium: Pankritio Stadium; Attendance: 5,455; Referee: Vassilis Terovitsas

9 January 2005 14	Kerkyra	0 – 1	Ergotelis	Kerkyra, Greece
14:45		Report	Voskaridis 22'	Stadium: Kerkyra Stadium; Attendance: 1,802; Referee: Christoforos Zografos

16 January 2005 15	Ergotelis	0 – 3	Panionios	Heraklion, Crete, Greece
18:00		Report	Breška 40', 54'; Nalitzis 44'	Stadium: Pankritio Stadium; Attendance: 6,085; Referee: Dimitrios Kalopoulos

23 January 2005 16	Iraklis	2 – 0	Ergotelis	Thessaloniki, Greece
19:00	Ioannou 28'; Epalle 68'	Report		Stadium: Kaftanzoglio Stadium; Attendance: 1,799; Referee: Dimitrios Ntamposis

30 January 2005 17	Ergotelis	1 – 1	Kallithea	Heraklion, Crete, Greece
14:45	Ogunsoto 30'	Report	Tsigas 90+4'	Stadium: Pankritio Stadium; Attendance: 3,955; Referee: Dimitrios Kalopoulos

12 February 2005 18	Aris	1 – 1	Ergotelis	Thessaloniki, Greece
16:45	Lazanas 53'	Report	Ogunsoto 43'	Stadium: Kleanthis Vikelidis Stadium; Attendance: 4,673; Referee: Makis Efthimiadis

20 February 2005 19	Ergotelis	2 – 1	Olympiacos	Heraklion, Crete, Greece
16:30	Addo 3'; Ogunsoto 90+1'	Report	Rivaldo 21' (pen.)	Stadium: Pankritio Stadium; Attendance: 27,950; Referee: Avraam Kemparidis

27 February 2005 20	Ergotelis	0 – 2	Skoda Xanthi	Heraklion
14:45		Report	Luciano 29'; Kléber 67'	Stadium: Pankritio Stadium; Attendance: 9,850; Referee: Vangelis Mazarakis

6 March 2005 21	Chalkidona	2 – 0	Ergotelis	Nikaia, Attica, Greece
15:30	Iliopoulos 22'; Falemi 59' (o.g.)	Report		Stadium: Neapoli Stadium; Attendance: 446; Referee: Fragkiskos Somarakakis

13 March 2005 22	Ergotelis	0 – 1	PAOK	Heraklion, Crete, Greece
17:30		Report	Salpingidis 52'	Stadium: Pankritio Stadium; Attendance: 7,450; Referee: Manolis Tapatzas

20 March 2005 23	AEK Athens	3 – 0	Ergotelis	Athens, Greece
15:30	Petkov 37'; Liberopoulos 49', 55'	Report		Stadium: "Spyros Louis" Olympic Stadium of Athens; Attendance: 30,273; Referee: Christos Vasiliou

3 April 2005 24	Ergotelis	0 – 1	OFI	Heraklion, Crete, Greece
18:30		Report	Machlas 88'	Stadium: Pankritio Stadium; Attendance: 9,850; Referee: Dimitrios Kalopoulos

10 April 2005 25	Ionikos	1 – 0	Ergotelis	Nikaia, Attica, Greece
16:30	Lettieri 45+2'	Report		Stadium: Neapoli Stadium; Attendance: 862; Referee: Dimitrios Styliaras

16 April 2005 26	Ergotelis	1 – 3	Panathinaikos	Heraklion, Crete, Greece
17:00	Sylla 44'	Report	Gekas 25'; Konstantinou 54'; González 75'	Stadium: Pankritio Stadium; Attendance: 21,995; Referee: Kyros Vassaras

23 April 2005 27	Apollon Kalamarias	1 – 0	Ergotelis	Kalamaria, Thessaloniki, Greece
17:45	Pappas 58'	Report		Stadium: Kalamaria Stadium; Attendance: 460; Referee: Kostas Finokaliotis

8 May 2005 28	Egaleo	2 – 0	Ergotelis	Egaleo, Athens, Greece
19:00	Agritis 45+1'; Barkoglou 48'	Report		Stadium: Stavros Mavrothalassitis Stadium; Attendance: 300; Referee: Dimitrios Takidis

14 May 2005 29	Ergotelis	1 – 1	Kerkyra	Heraklion, Crete, Greece
17:00	Dimitris 88'	Report	Garozis 72'	Stadium: Pankritio Stadium; Attendance: 6,500; Referee: Spiros Vasiliou

25 May 2005 30	Panionios	2 – 0	Ergotelis	Nea Smyrni, Athens, Greece
18:30	Mantzios 20'; Charalabakis 47' (o.g.)	Report		Stadium: Nea Smyrni Stadium; Attendance: Behind closed doors Referee: Giannis Tsachilidis

== Greek Cup ==
=== First round ===
Team 1	Agg.	Team 2	1st leg	2nd leg
Vyzas Megara	2 – 6	Ergotelis (Q)	0 – 2	2 – 4

==== Matches ====
Win Draw Loss

11 September 2004 First Round	Vyzas Megara	0 – 2	Ergotelis	Aspropyrgos, Greece
17:00		Report	Ogunsoto 7'; Pârvu 12'	Stadium: Aspropyrgos Municipal Stadium; Attendance: 500; Referee: Dimitrios Styliaras

10 October 2004 First Round	Ergotelis	4 – 2	Vyzas Megara	Heraklion, Crete, Greece
16:00	Voskaridis 4', 90'; Goniotakis 27'; Labrakis 84'	Report	Kwafo 56'; Trogadis 85'	Stadium: Pankritio Stadium; Attendance: 3,455; Referee: Antonis Kouklakis

=== Second round ===
Team 1	Agg.	Team 2	1st leg	2nd leg
Ergotelis	3–3 (1–3 p)	Ptolemaida	3–0	0–3

==== Matches ====
Win Draw Loss

15 December 2004 Second Round	Ergotelis	3 – 0	Ptolemaida	Heraklion, Crete, Greece
14:45	Gircha 22'; Pourzitidis 58' (o.g.); Ogunsoto 88' (pen.)	Report		Stadium: Pankritio Stadium; Attendance: 100; Referee: Kostas Finokaliotis

11 January 2005 Second Round	Ptolemaida	3 – 0 (a.e.t.) (3 – 1 p)	Ergotelis	Ptolemaida, Greece
14:15	Kaptiev 30'; Skentzos 40' (o.g.); Dimitriadis 47'	Report		Stadium: Ptolemaida Stadium; Attendance: N/A; Referee: Avraam Kemparidis
	Penalties
	Milošeski (penalty missed); Tsoukalidis (penalty scored); Aliatidis (penalty scored); Kaptiev (penalty scored)		Ogunsoto (penalty missed); Eleftheriadis (penalty missed); Pârvu (penalty scored); Gircha (penalty missed)

== Statistics ==
=== Goal scorers ===
No.	Pos.	Nation	Name	Alpha Ethniki	Greek Cup	Total
9	FW	(Nigeria)	Patrick Ogunsoto	11	2	13
10	MF	(Greece)	Stavros Labrakis	2	1	3
77	FW	(Cyprus)	Stefanos Voskaridis	1	2	3
11	FW	(Romania)	Lucian Pârvu	1	1	2
8	MF	(Greece)	Ilias Eleftheriadis	1	0	1
17	FW	(Ghana)	Ishmael Addo	1	0	1
15	MF	(Guinea)	Jean Marie Sylla	1	0	1
28	DF	(Greece) (Albania)	Alkis Dimitris	1	0	1
7	FW	(Greece)	Vasilios Goniotakis	0	1	1
23	MF	(Ukraine)	Andriy Gircha	0	1	1
-	-	-	Opponent's own Goals	0	1	1
TOTAL				19	9	28

Last updated: 25 April 2014
