= Maurício Fernandes =

Brazilian footballer (born 1976)

Maurício
Personal information
- Full name: Maurício Fernandes
- Date of birth: 5 July 1976 (age 50)
- Place of birth: Passo Fundo, Brazil
- Height: 1.92 m (6 ft 4 in)
- Position: Centre back

Senior career*
Years	Team	Apps	(Gls)
1994	Itumbiara	7	(0)
1997–1999	Brasil Farroupilha	35	(3)
1998	→ Brasil Pelotas (loan)		
1999	Chapecoense		
1999	Vila Nova	2	(0)
2000	Matonense		
2000–2001	Bahia	11	(2)
2002	Fluminense	31	(1)
2003	Juventude	9	(0)
2003–2006	Braga	17	(1)
2005–2006	→ Estrela Amadora (loan)	31	(4)
2007	Pohang Steelers	3	(0)
2007–2008	Estrela Amadora	27	(4)
2008–2009	Ergotelis	20	(2)
2009–2010	Feirense	22	(3)
2010–2013	Olhanense	65	(4)
2014	Brasil Farroupilha		
- * Club domestic league appearances and goals

Maurício Fernandes (born 5 July 1976), known simply as Maurício, is a Brazilian former footballer who played as a central defender.

Possessing a powerful shot which allowed him to score several goals from free kicks, he spent the vast majority of his professional career in Portugal, representing four clubs and amassing Primeira Liga totals of 141 games and 13 goals over the course of eight seasons.

== Club career ==
Born in Passo Fundo, Rio Grande do Sul, Maurício did not start playing organised football until well into his 20s. He represented mainly modest sides in his country, with the exception of Fluminense FC in 2002, helping the Rio de Janeiro team to the Campeonato Carioca.

In August 2003, shortly after being released by Esporte Clube Juventude, Maurício signed with S.C. Braga in Portugal, being rarely used by the Minho side in three years (he was inclusively demoted to the reserves) and also being loaned to fellow Primeira Liga club C.F. Estrela da Amadora, where he excelled, scoring four goals as the team finished in mid-table in the 2005–06 season.

Subsequently returned to Braga, Maurício left for the Pohang Steelers of South Korea in the 2007 January transfer window. After appearing rarely in the K League 1 he returned to Portugal and former club Estrela, netting another four goals as it again managed to retain top-division status after finishing 13th, notably in a 2–2 home draw against eventual champions FC Porto.

After one year in Greece with Ergotelis FC, the 33-year-old Maurício returned once again to Portugal, joining C.D. Feirense of the Segunda Liga on a one-year contract. For the following campaign he returned to the top flight, with S.C. Olhanense.

== Honours ==
Bahia

- Campeonato Baiano: 2001
- Campeonato do Nordeste: 2001

Fluminense

- Campeonato Carioca: 2002
