= Patrick Ogunsoto =

Nigerian footballer (born 1983)

Personal information
- Full name: Patrick Babatunde Ogunsoto
- Date of birth: 19 April 1983 (age 43)
- Place of birth: Lagos, Nigeria
- Height: 1.79 m (5 ft 10 in)
- Position: Forward

Youth career
- 1998–2000: Julius Berger

Senior career*
Years	Team	Apps	(Gls)
2000–2001	Paniliakos	0	(0)
2001	Julius Berger	0	(0)
2001–2002	APOEL	0	(0)
2002–2006	Ergotelis	115	(71)
2006–2008	Westerlo	44	(20)
2008–2010	Ergotelis	47	(14)
2009–2010	→ OFI (loan)	22	(6)
2011–2012	Lokomotiv Plovdiv	3	(1)
2012–2013	Anagennisi Epanomi	11	(5)
2013	Olympiacos Volos	23	(7)
2013–2014	Acharnaikos	11	(3)
2014	Ermionida	4	(0)
2016	Doxa Trilofos		
2016–2017	Makedonikos	19	(8)
2017−2018	Megas Alexandros Iasmos	11	(8)
2018	Moudania	8	(3)
Total		318	(146)
- * Club domestic league appearances and goals

Patrick Ogunsoto (born 19 April 1983) is a Nigerian former professional footballer who played as a striker. He spent the majority of his career in Greece and is best known for his tenure at Greek side Ergotelis, for which he still remains the all-time top scorer.

== Career ==
=== Early career ===
Ogunsoto started his career with local clubs in Lagos, eventually signing with local side Julius Berger at 17. He then made his first European move by signing with Paniliakos in Greece, but wouldn't be eligible to play for the club. He returned to Nigeria and Julius Berger for one year. At age 19, he was tried out by Greek clubs Aris Thessaloniki and Ergotelis but eventually signed with Cypriot First Division club APOEL. As he was deemed too young to be included among his manager's Eugene Gerards' plans, he returned to Greece in 2002 and signed for Cretan club Ergotelis, which played in the Gamma Ethniki at the time.

=== Ergotelis ===
Ogunsoto built up his reputation in Greece during his spell at Ergotelis, in which he scored a total of 71 goals in 114 appearances, celebrating consecutive promotions in a steady run from the Gamma Ethniki to Greece's top tier football division, Alpha Ethniki. In his first season at Ergotelis, Ogunsoto scored 30 goals in 32 games and the team was promoted to the Beta Ethniki. He followed up with another nine goals in his second season, helping the club gain another promotion, this time in Alpha Ethniki, Greece's top tier football division. He continued being the club's top scorer for a third year in a row, scoring 11 goals in 29 games during the club's first season in the Alpha Ethniki, but the team was eventually relegated. Then Ogunsoto became instrumental in the club's second promotion and winning of the division title, by being declared top-scorer once again with a total of 21 goals at the end of the 2005−06 season. His performances did not go unnoticed though, and after brief interest with Greek club Panathinaikos and AEK, he subsequently moved to Belgium and Westerlo, thus ending a four-year run with Ergotelis in Crete.

=== Westerlo ===
In his first season with Westerlo, Ogunsoto became second top scorer in the Jupiler Pro League, scoring 20 goals in 34 games. Despite reported interest from Eredivisie and Russian Premier League clubs, Ogunsoto remained for a second season with Westerlo, making 10 appearances and scoring no goals. In January 2008, he would return to his former club Ergotelis, expressing a desire to return to the club where he made his name.

=== Return to Ergotelis ===
On 18 January 2008, Ogunsoto returned to Ergotelis signing a three-year contract. He scored 6 goals in 13 matches, helping the club avoid relegation at the end of the season. He made another 29 appearances in the 2008–09 season, scoring 8 goals. However, tensions rose between the player and manager Nikos Karageorgiou, which led to an eventual fallout with the club's board of directors. Next season saw Ogunsoto making a total of six appearances for the club, mostly as a substitute. On the winter transfer window of 2009, Ogunsoto was loaned to local rival OFI, playing in the Beta Ethniki on a six-month deal. He featured in 22 matches total, scoring 6 goals for the club. Finally, in August 2010, the 27-year-old Nigerian striker, terminated his contract with Ergotelis on mutual consent. For his achievements with Ergotelis since his original tenure, he was honoured by club president Apostolos Papoutsakis with a golden emblem of the club. In a total of 162 official matches, he had scored 85 goals, making him the club's all-time top scorer.

=== Later pro career ===
On 18 January 2011, Ogunsoto signed a 1.5-year contract with Lokomotiv Plovdiv as a free agent. He was released from the team at the end of the 2011–12 A PFG season, having made a total of three appearances and having scored one goal. In the summer of 2012 he returned to Greece and moved to Anagennisi Epanomi in the Football League. Ogunsoto finished the first half of the season with 5 goals in 11 appearances. In winter transfer window he moved to Olympiacos Volos, and ironically scored his first goal against his former team Ergotelis in a 2–0 home win. He finished the season with 7 goals in 23 appearances for the club. On 16 July 2013, Ogunsoto signed a one-year contract with Acharnaikos in the Gamma Ethniki. After six months, 11 appearances and three goals, he was released from his contract. After a couple of weeks Ogunsoto agreed to continue his career at Ermionida in the Football League 2 (Greece). Three months later however, he would terminate his contract with the club after realizing he was not counted among the first choices of Ermionida manager Roberto Bolano.

=== Amateur divisions ===
In the summer of 2015, Ogunsoto underwent trial with Belgian Second Division club KMSK Deinze, without however signing a contract with the club. In January 2016, Ogunsoto returned to Greece and reportedly partook in training sessions of Thessaloniki-based amateur club Keravnos Aggelochori, a club playing in regional Macedonia Football Clubs Association (Macedonia FCA) competitions. He eventually signed a contract with fellow Thessaloniki-based club Doxa Trilofos in February 2016. In July 2016, Ogunsoto signed with Macedonia FCA A1 Championship Division club Makedonikos. Ogunsoto helped the club achieve promotion to the Gamma Ethniki as champions, contributing with 8 goals in 19 games. He was offered the position of general manager at Makedonikos at the end of the season but declined, as he was keen on playing football for at least one more season.

Aged 34, Ogunsoto applied, and was rumored to participate in the sixth season of Greece's highly popular reality show Survivor, entering negotiations with several clubs playing in local football championships of Greece. He eventually signed a contract with Thrace FCA club Megas Alexandros Iasmos. He left the club in January 2018 citing personal reasons, having scored 8 goals in 11 matches. He then signed with another amateur club from Chalkidiki, Moudania until the end of the season.

=== Television ===
Ogunsoto had applied for the sixth season of the popular reality show Survivor Greece, and was eventually admitted into the show halfway during the seventh season. In 2023, he appeared on I'm a Celebrity...Get Me Out of Here! (Greece).

== Personal life ==
Considered as one of the most charismatic strikers to ever grace Greek football competitions, Ogunsoto rose to cult status in Greece during his tenure at Ergotelis for his non-proficient use of the Greek language at the time, exhibited during an enraged post-match interview after a 1−1 Cretan derby draw vs. OFI in 2008. Lashing out against the referee for poor officiating, Ogunsoto delivered his infamous «Pos genen afto» speech (roughly translated as «How can this happen»), which has since spawned many memes and is frequently used as a catchphrase across Greece and Greek media.

== Career statistics ==
As of matches played 21 January 2018

Appearances and goals by club, season and competition
Club	Season	League			Cup		Other		Total	
Club	Season	Division	Apps	Goals	Apps	Goals	Apps	Goals	Apps	Goals
Paniliakos	2000–01	Alpha Ethniki	0	0	0	0	—		0	0
Julius Berger	2001–02	Nigerian Premier League	0	0	0	0	—		0	0
APOEL	2001–02	Cypriot First Division	0	0	0	0	—		0	0
Ergotelis	2002–03	Gamma Ethniki	32	30	4	5	—		36	35
Ergotelis	2003–04	Beta Ethniki	25	9	4	3	1 (Note: Alpha Ethniki Promotion Play-Off)	0	30	12
Ergotelis	2004–05	Alpha Ethniki	30	11	3	0	—		33	11
Ergotelis	2005–06	Beta Ethniki	28	21	3	2	—		31	23
Ergotelis	Total		115	71	14	10	1	0	130	81
Westerlo	2006–07	Jupiler Pro League	34	20	2	0	—		36	20
Westerlo	2007–08	Jupiler Pro League	10	0	0	0	—		10	0
Westerlo	Total		44	20	2	0	0	0	46	20
Ergotelis	2007–08	Super League Greece	13	6	0	0	—		13	6
Ergotelis	2008–09	Super League Greece	28	8	2	0	—		30	8
Ergotelis	2009–10	Super League Greece	6	0	0	0	—		6	0
Ergotelis	Total		47	14	2	0	0	0	49	14
OFI	2009–10	Football League	18	5	0	0	4 (Note: Football League Play-Offs)	1	22	6
Lokomotiv Plovdiv	2010–11	A Group	3	1	0	0	—		3	1
Anagennisi Epanomi	2011–12	Football League	11	5	0	0	—		11	5
Olympiacos Volos	2011–12	Football League	20	7	0	0	3	0	23	7
Acharnaikos	2012–13	Football League	10	2	1	1	—		11	3
Ermionida	2013–14	Gamma Ethniki	4	0	0	0	—		4	0
Career total			272	125	15	6	8	1	299	137

== Honours ==
Ergotelis

- 2nd division: 2005−06

Individual

- Greek Cup Top scorer: 2002–03
- 3rd division Top scorer: 2002−03
- 2nd division Top scorer: 2005−06
- 2nd division Player of the Season: 2005−06

Records

- Ergotelis All-time Top scorer: 85 goals.
