= Panagiotis Kordonouris =

Greek footballer (born 1975)

Personal information
- Date of birth: 8 November 1975 (age 50)
- Place of birth: Amaliada, Greece
- Height: 1.80 m (5 ft 11 in)
- Position: Defender

Youth career
- –1996: Asteras Amaliada

Senior career*
Years	Team	Apps	(Gls)
1996–2001	Panachaiki	127	(0)
2001–2006	Skoda Xanthi	36	(1)
2005–2006	→ Ergotelis (loan)	25	(1)
2006–2010	Ergotelis	103	(3)
2010–2011	Panachaiki		
2011	Levadiakos	10	(0)
2011	AO Chania		
2012	Rouvas		
2013–2014	P.A.O. Krousonas		
2014–2016	Rouvas		
2016–2017	Gortys		
2017	Tylissos		

Managerial career
- 2018−: Ergotelis Youth Academy
- * Club domestic league appearances and goals as of 8 August 2011

Panagiotis Kordonouris (Greek: Παναγιώτης Κορδονούρης; born 8 November 1975) is a Greek former footballer. He spent the majority of his career in Crete, representing clubs at various competition levels spanning the Greek Super League to Crete's amateur regional competitions.

== Playing career ==
Born in Amaliada, Kordonouris began playing football with his local side Asteras Amaliada, before being spotted by Alpha Ethniki club Panachaiki in 1996. He played for Panachaiki for five seasons, between 1996 and 2001, registering over 150 appearances across all competitions. He then moved to fellow Alpha Ethniki side Skoda Xanthi, where he stayed for four years but made only 36 league appearances. He moved on loan to Beta Ethniki side Ergotelis in July 2005, and helped his club earn promotion to the Super League as champions. Ergotelis renewed his contract for the 2006−07 season, after Kordonouris was released by Skoda Xanthi. He stayed with the Cretans until 2010, when he was offered a post in the managerial team at age 35 which Kordonouris refused. He returned to his former club Panachaiki for six months and eventually signed with Football League side Levadiakos for the rest of the season.

Kordonouris returned to Crete after his brief stint at Levadiakos, having celebrated another promotion. He signed with Gamma Ethniki side AO Chania and left the club after six months to join fellow Cretan third-tier competitors Rouvas until the end of the season. He then signed his final professional contract with P.A.O. Krousonas, also in the Gamma Ethniki, before dropping down to play in the amateur regional competitions of the Heraklion Football Clubs Association.

=== Career statistics ===
As of matches played 8 August 2011.

Club	Season	League			Cup		Europe		Other		Total	
Club	Season	Division	Apps	Goals	Apps	Goals	Apps	Goals	Apps	Goals	Apps	Goals
Panachaiki	1996−97	Alpha Ethniki	19	0	5	0	—		—		24	0
Panachaiki	1997−98	Alpha Ethniki	24	0	1	0	4 (Note: UEFA Intertoto Cup)	0	—		29	0
Panachaiki	1998−99	Beta Ethniki	30	0	2	0	—		—		32	0
Panachaiki	1999−00	Alpha Ethniki	30	0	3	0	—		—		33	0
Panachaiki	2000−01	Alpha Ethniki	21	0	14	0	—		3 (Note: Relegation Play-Offs)	0	38	0
Total			124	0	25	0	4	0	3	0	156	0
Skoda Xanthi	2001−02	Alpha Ethniki	21	1	10	1	—		—		31	2
Skoda Xanthi	2002−03	Alpha Ethniki	13	0	3	0	2 (Note: UEFA Cup)	0	—		18	0
Skoda Xanthi	2003−04	Alpha Ethniki	0	0	0	0	—		—		0	0
Skoda Xanthi	2004−05	Alpha Ethniki	2	0	0	0	—		—		2	0
Total			36	1	13	1	2	0	—		51	2
Ergotelis	2005–06	Beta Ethniki	25	1	2	0	—		—		27	1
Ergotelis	2006–07	Super League Greece	27	0	2	0	—		—		29	0
Ergotelis	2007–08	Super League Greece	29	2	1	0	—		—		30	2
Ergotelis	2008–09	Super League Greece	24	0	2	0	—		—		26	0
Ergotelis	2009–10	Super League Greece	23	1	1	0	—		—		24	1
Total			128	4	8	0	—		—		136	4
Panachaiki	2010−11	Football League 2	?	?	3	0	—		—		?	?
Total			?	?	3	0	—		—		?	?
Levadiakos	2010−11	Football League	10	0	0	0	—		—		10	0
Total			10	0	0	0	—		—		10	0
AO Chania	2011−12	Football League 2	?	?	1	0	—		—		1	0
Total			?	?	1	0	—		—		1	0
Rouvas	2012−13	Football League 2	?	?	1	0	—		—		1	0
Total			?	?	1	0	—		—		1	0
P.A.O. Krousonas	2013−14	Gamma Ethniki	?	?	—		—		—		?	?
Total			?	?	—		—		—		?	?
Career total			298	5	51	1	6	0	3	0	358	6

== Managerial career ==
Kordonouris holds the UEFA C Licence. He began his managerial career as a coach at the Ergotelis Youth Academy while he still played for Heraklion FCA A1 Division club Tylissos, and was promoted to head coach of the Martinengo Heraklion FCA C Division Ergotelis football department in 2018. He was promoted to the head coach position for the unofficial U−17 youth team of the club, Kanaria Ergoteli in 2019.

== Honours ==
Ergotelis]]

- Beta Ethniki: 2005–06
