= Dimitrios Geladaris =

Greek footballer and manager

Personal information
- Date of birth: 6 November 1974 (age 51)
- Place of birth: Kozani, Greece
- Height: 1.78 m (5 ft 10 in)
- Position: Defender

Team information
- Current team: AEL (assistant)

Senior career*
| Years | Team | Apps | (Gls) |
| 1993–1996 | Pontioi Veria | 70 | (1) |
| 1996–1998 | Ethnikos Piraeus | 68 | (3) |
| 1999–2003 | Skoda Xanthi | 124 | (3) |
| 2003–2004 | Chalkidona | 23 | (2) |
| 2004–2008 | Atromitos | 105 | (4) |
| 2008–2010 | Ergotelis | 33 | (1) |
| 2010–2011 | Doxa Drama | 37 | (1) |
| 2011 | Veria | 3 | (0) |
| 2012 | Doxa Drama | 13 | (0) |
| 2012– 2013 | Kavala | 24 | (0) |
| 2013–2015 | Doxa Drama | 14 | (0) |
| 2016–2017 | Doxa Theologou | | |
| 2017–2018 | Aspida Xanthi | | |
- * Club domestic league appearances and goals as of 8 August 2019

Dimitrios "Dimitris" Geladaris (Greek: Δημήτριος "Δημήτρης" Γελαδάρης; born 6 November 1974) is a Greek former professional footballer and currently the assistant manager of Super League 1 club AEL.

== Career ==
Born in Galatini, Kozani, Geladaris began playing football with Pontioi Veria.

== Personal life ==
Since 2013, Geladaris attends the Evening High School of Drama.
