= Charalampos Charalampakis =

Greek footballer (born 1980)

Personal information
- Full name: Charalampos Charalampakis
- Date of birth: 31 August 1980 (age 46)
- Place of birth: Heraklion, Crete, Greece
- Height: 1.75 m (5 ft 9 in)
- Position: Defender

Youth career
- −1998: OFI

Senior career*
Years	Team	Apps	(Gls)
1998–2002	OFI	20	(0)
2002–2003	Egaleo	0	(0)
2003–2005	Ergotelis	59	(7)
2005–2007	AEP Paphos	46	(6)
2007–2008	Thrasyvoulos	21	(1)
2008–2009	Panetolikos	24	(2)
2009−2010	Thrasyvoulos	7	(0)
2010−2011	OFI	10	(0)
Total		172	(12)

International career
2001	Greece U−21	1	(0)
- * Club domestic league appearances and goals

Charalampos Charalampakis (Greek: Χαράλαμπος Χαραλαμπάκης; born 31 August 1980) is a Greek retired professional football defender.

== Career ==
Charalampakis began his career at his local Alpha Ethniki side OFI. During his time with the Cretan club, Charalabakis managed to play in the 2000–01 UEFA Cup and was called up to the Greek national U−21 squad once in 2001. He left OFI to join fellow Alpha Ethniki club Egaleo, but made no appearances for the Athens-based club in the competition. He then returned to Crete to join 2nd Division side Ergotelis, with whom he celebrated promotion to the Alpha Ethniki during the 2003−04 Beta Ethniki season, as well as suffered relegation in his second season with the club.

After leaving Ergotelis in the summer of 2005, Charalabakis spent two seasons in Cyprus with AEP Paphos, before returning to Greece and join Beta Ethniki side Thrasyvoulos in 2007. He then moved to fellow Beta Ethniki side Panetolikos and returned to Thrasyvoulos in 2009.

In January 2010, Charalampakis returned to his first club OFI, where he retired his professional football career in 2011, and was hired by the club as caretaker.
