= Jean Marie Sylla =

Guinean footballer (1983–2025)

Jean Sylla

Personal information
- Full name: Jean Marie Sylla
- Date of birth: 22 April 1983
- Place of birth: Conakry, Guinea
- Date of death: 26 July 2025 (aged 42)
- Height: 1.85 m (6 ft 1 in)
- Position: Left midfielder

Senior career*
Years	Team	Apps	(Gls)
2001−2003	Horoya Conakry		
2003–2005	Ergotelis	48	(4)
2005–2006	Kallithea	22	(1)
2006	OFI	11	(0)
2007	Apollon Kalamarias	10	(1)
2007–2009	PAS Giannina	29	(2)
2009–2010	Kalamata	15	(1)
2011–2012	Villemomble Sports	26	(2)
2012–2014	ES Viry-Châtillon	48	(4)
Total		209	(15)
- * Club domestic league appearances and goals

Jean Marie Sylla (22 April 1983 – 26 July 2025) was a Guinean professional footballer who played as a left midfielder.

== Career ==
Sylla was born in Conakry. He began his football career at Horoya Conakry, with whom he won the Guinea National Championship in 2001. He then spent most of his professional career in Greece. He played for Heraklion-based Beta Ethniki side Ergotelis, most notably helping them achieve promotion to the Super League Greece for the first time in their history, scoring the winning injury time goal vs. Akratitos during the 2003−04 Alpha Ethniki relegation play-off match. He left the club after the 2004–05 season following contractual disputes after the club was relegated back to the Beta Ethniki, and eventually joined Super League Greece side Kallithea. After one season in top-flight at the El Paso, Sylla stayed in Greece until 2011, playing for OFI, Apollon Kalamarias, PAS Giannina and Kalamata at various levels of the Greek football league system.

In 2011, Sylla moved to France and continued his career with CFA clubs Villemomble Sports and ES Viry-Châtillon. Having left the club in 2014 to tend to a family-related issue, Sylla was diagnosed with Charcot's disease in September 2014, and was forced to retire at age 31.

== Death ==
On 26 July 2025, Sylla's former club Ergotelis announced that he had died that day. He was 42.

== Career statistics ==
Appearances and goals by club, season and competition
Club	Season	League			Cup		Other		Total	
Club	Season	Division	Apps	Goals	Apps	Goals	Apps	Goals	Apps	Goals
Ergotelis	2003–04	Beta Ethniki	25	2	0	0	1 (Note: Alpha Ethniki Promotion Play-Off)	1	26	3
Ergotelis	2004–05	Alpha Ethniki	22	1	0	0	—		22	1
Ergotelis	Total		47	3	0	0	1	1	48	4
Kallithea	2005–06	Alpha Ethniki	22	1	0	0	—		22	1
OFI	2006–07	Super League Greece	11	0	2	0	—		13	0
Apollon Kalamarias	2006–07	Super League Greece	10	1	0	0	—		10	1
PAS Giannina	2007–08	Beta Ethniki	16	2	1	0	—		17	2
PAS Giannina	2008–09	Beta Ethniki	13	0	0	0	—		13	0
PAS Giannina	Total		29	2	1	0	—		30	2
Kalamata	2009–10	Beta Ethniki	15	1	0	0	—		15	1
Villemomble Sports	2011–12	CFA	26	2	0	0	—		26	2
Viry-Châtillon	2012–13	CFA	31	3	0	0	—		31	3
Viry-Châtillon	2013–14	CFA	17	1	0	0	—		17	1
Viry-Châtillon	Total		48	4	0	0	—		48	4
Career total			208	14	3	0	1	1	212	15

== Honours ==
Horoya

- Guinée Championnat National: 2001
