= Ivan Tasić =

Serbian footballer

Personal information
- Full name: Ivan Tasić
- Date of birth: 8 May 1979 (age 47)
- Place of birth: Belgrade, SFR Yugoslavia
- Height: 1.74 m (5 ft 9 in)
- Position: Midfielder

Youth career
- Red Star Belgrade

Senior career*
Years	Team	Apps	(Gls)
1999–2005	Železnik	124	(5)
2005–2006	Kalamata	26	(1)
2006–2008	Ergotelis	46	(0)
2008–2010	Kalamata	61	(2)
2010–2011	Levadiakos	24	(0)
2012	BSK Borča	15	(0)
2012	Niki Volos	9	(0)
2013	Kavala	10	(0)
Total		315	(8)

Managerial career
- 2022: Železničar Pančevo (assistant)
- 2023: Rad (assistant)
- 2023: Jagodina
- 2024: Zvezdara
- 2024: Đerdap Kladovo
- * Club domestic league appearances and goals

Ivan Tasić (Serbian Cyrillic: Иван Тасић; born 8 May 1979) is a Serbian former professional footballer who played as a midfielder.

== Playing career ==
Tasić made a name for himself at Železnik, amassing 124 appearances and scoring five goals in the top flight between 1999 and 2005. He was a member of the team that won the Serbia and Montenegro Cup in the 2004–05 season.

In 2005, Tasić moved abroad to Greece and joined second league club Kalamata. He would move to the newly promoted first league side Ergotelis in 2006, appearing in 46 league games over the next two years. In 2008, Tasić returned to Kalamata for two seasons, before moving to fellow second league club Levadiakos in 2010.

== Statistics ==
Club	Season	League	
Club	Season	Apps	Goals
Železnik	1999–2000	23	1
Železnik	2000–01	18	1
Železnik	2001–02	27	0
Železnik	2002–03	15	0
Železnik	2003–04	16	2
Železnik	2004–05	25	1
Železnik	Total	124	5

== Managerial career ==
Tasić worked at the FK Voždovac academy and was named manager of FK Jagodina in summer 2023 and of Đerdap Kladovo in summer 2024.

== Honours ==
Železnik

- Serbia and Montenegro Cup: 2004–05
