= Lampros Kefaloukos =

Greek footballer

Personal information
- Date of birth: 31 March 1982 (age 44)
- Place of birth: Heraklion, Crete, Greece
- Height: 1.87 m (6 ft 1 1/2 in)
- Position: Defender

Senior career*
Years	Team	Apps	(Gls)
2002–2006	OFI	6	(0)
2005	→ PAON Malia (loan)	15	(1)
2005–2006	→ Ergotelis (loan)	23	(1)
2006–2009	Ergotelis	24	(0)
2009–2010	Ionikos	0	(0)
2010–2011	Rodos	21	(0)
- * Club domestic league appearances and goals as of 1 July 2011

Lampros Kefaloukos (Greek: Λάμπρος Κεφαλούκος; born 31 March 1982) is a former professional footballer who played as a defender for several clubs in Greece, including stints with OFI and Ergotelis in the Alpha Ethniki.

== Career ==
Born in Heraklion, Kefaloukos began playing football with local side Irodotos Neas Alikarnassou. He went on loans to Gamma Ethniki side PAON Malia and Beta Ethniki side Ergotelis before leaving on a free transfer to sign with Ergotelis on a permanent basis in July 2006.

In September 2011, Kefaloukos signed a one-year contract to play for Episkopi F.C. in the Rethymno regional league.
