= Daniel Kenedy =

Portuguese footballer

Personal information
- Full name: Daniel Kenedy Pimentel Mateus dos Santos
- Date of birth: 18 February 1974 (age 52)
- Place of birth: Bissau, Guinea
- Height: 1.81 m (5 ft 11 in)
- Positions: Midfielder; full-back

Youth career
- 1984–1985: CAC Pontinha
- 1985–1993: Benfica

Senior career*
Years	Team	Apps	(Gls)
1993–1996	Benfica	59	(3)
1996–1997	Paris Saint-Germain	29	(0)
1997–1998	Porto	9	(0)
1998–2001	Estrela Amadora	60	(4)
1998	→ Albacete (loan)	3	(0)
2001–2003	Marítimo	37	(6)
2004	Braga	17	(0)
2005	Académica	17	(1)
2005–2006	APOEL	10	(0)
2006–2009	Ergotelis	63	(2)
2007	→ Kallithea (loan)	8	(2)
2009–2011	Aias Salamina	31	(7)
2011–2012	Peramaikos		
Total		343+	(25+)

International career
1994–1996	Portugal U21	11	(1)

Managerial career
- 2015: Pinhalnovense
- 2015: Vitória Sernache
- 2016: Coruchense
- 2016: Almancilense
- 2016–2017: Leixões
- 2018–2019: Cartaxo
- 2023: Loures
- * Club domestic league appearances and goals

Daniel Kenedy Pimentel Mateus dos Santos (born 18 February 1974), known as Kenedy, is a Portuguese former professional footballer. A midfielder or full-back, he played on the left side of the pitch.

He appeared in 199 Primeira Liga matches over 11 seasons (14 goals), mainly in representation of Benfica and Estrela da Amadora. He also competed in France, Spain, Cyprus and Greece.

In 2015, Kenedy began working as a manager.

== Club career ==
Kenedy was born in Bissau, Portuguese Guinea. During his extensive career, he represented in his country S.L. Benfica – making his Primeira Liga debut aged 19 – FC Porto, C.F. Estrela da Amadora, C.S. Marítimo, S.C. Braga (January to December 2004) and Académica de Coimbra.

In 1996, Kenedy had his first abroad stint, with Paris Saint-Germain FC from France, starting regularly for the capital club as it finished second in Ligue 1. Subsequently, he represented Albacete Balompié – only three matches for the Spanish Segunda División side – APOEL FC, Ergotelis FC, Kallithea FC, Aias Salamina F.C. and Peramaikos FC.

Kenedy appeared in all three top tiers in Greece. Portugal notwithstanding, he played professionally in four countries.

== International career ==
Kenedy represented Portugal at the 1996 Summer Olympics, helping the nation to finish fourth in Atlanta, Georgia. He was surprisingly called up to the 2002 FIFA World Cup squad while still uncapped on the senior level, after injuries ruled Simão Sabrosa and Luís Boa Morte out of António Oliveira's selection; however, he was dismissed from the team prior to the start of the tournament after testing positive for the banned diuretic furosemide that was in his slimming pills, and was replaced by Hugo Viana.

== Coaching career ==
On 17 March 2015, Kenedy was handed his first managerial post at C.D. Pinhalnovense, eventually avoiding relegation from the third division. He was hired by LigaPro strugglers Leixões S.C. on 2 November 2016, taking the team to the quarter-finals of the Taça de Portugal where they were eliminated by his former club Benfica after a 6–2 away loss.

Kenedy resigned in August 2017, only three games into the new season.

== Personal life ==
Kenedy was named after American president John F. Kennedy (note the difference in spelling).

== Career statistics ==
Appearances and goals by club, season and competition
Club	Season	League		Cup		Europe		Other (Note: Includes Coupe de la Ligue, Supertaça Cândido de Oliveira and UEFA Super Cup)		Total	
Club	Season	Apps	Goals	Apps	Goals	Apps	Goals	Apps	Goals	Apps	Goals
Benfica	1992–93	1	0	0	0	0	0	—		1	0
Benfica	1993–94	14	0	2	0	2	0	1	0	19	0
Benfica	1994–95	22	2	2	1	6	0	2	0	32	3
Benfica	1995–96	22	1	4	0	5	1	—		31	2
Benfica	Total	59	3	8	1	13	1	3	0	83	5
Paris Saint-Germain	1996–97	29	0	2	0	6	0	2	0	39	0
Porto	1997–98	9	0	4	0	2	0	0	0	15	0
Albacete (loan)	1998–99	3	0			—		—		3	0
Estrela Amadora	1998–99	8	1	0	0	—		—		8	1
Estrela Amadora	1999–2000	25	1	0	0	—		—		25	1
Estrela Amadora	2000–01	27	2	0	0	—		—		27	2
Estrela Amadora	Total	60	4	0	0	0	0	0	0	60	4
Marítimo	2001–02	30	6	7	0	4	0	—		41	6
Marítimo	2002–03	0	0	0	0	—		—		0	0
Marítimo	2003–04	7	0	0	0	—		—		7	0
Marítimo	Total	37	6	7	0	4	0	0	0	48	6
Marítimo B	2003–04	1	0	—		—		—		1	0
Braga	2003–04	11	0	2	0	—		—		13	0
Braga	2004–05	6	0	1	0	2	0	—		9	0
Braga	Total	17	0	3	0	2	0	0	0	22	0
Braga B	2004–05	1	0	—		—		—		1	0
Académica	2004–05	17	1	2	0	—		—		19	2
APOEL	2005–06	10	0			4	0	—		14	0
Ergotelis	2005–06	16	0	0	0	—		—		16	0
Ergotelis	2006–07	21	2	2	0	—		—		23	2
Ergotelis	2007–08	13	0	0	0	—		—		13	0
Ergotelis	2008–09	13	0	1	0	—		—		14	0
Ergotelis	Total	63	2	3	0	0	0	0	0	66	2
Kallithea (loan)	2007–08	8	2	1	1	—		—		9	3
Aias Salamina	2009–10	31	7			—		—		31	7
Aias Salamina	2010–11					—		—			
Aias Salamina	Total	31	7			0	0	0	0	31	7
Peramaikos	2011–12					—		—			
Career total		345+	25+	30+	2+	31	1	5	0	411+	28+

== Honours ==
Benfica

- Primeira Liga: 1993–94
- Taça de Portugal: 1995–96

Porto

- Primeira Liga: 1997–98
- Taça de Portugal: 1997–98

== See also ==
- List of doping cases in sport
