= Andreas Skentzos =

Greek footballer

Personal information
- Date of birth: 23 September 1972 (age 54)
- Place of birth: Elefsina, Greece
- Height: 1.81 m (5 ft 11 in)
- Position: Defender

Senior career*
Years	Team	Apps	(Gls)
1991–1993	Panelefsiniakos		
1993–2000	OFI		
2000–2004	Aris		
2004–2005	Ergotelis		
2005–2009	Rodos		

Managerial career
- 2015–2017: Aris (assistant)
- 2017–2018: Panthiraikos
- 2018–2019: Omonia (assistant)
- 2019–2020: Agios Nikolaos
- 2020: AS Ano Meras
- 2020–2021: A.E. Mykonos
- 2021–2022: Poros
- 2022: Panelefsiniakos
- 2023: A.E. Kifisia (assistant)
- 2023: Kalamata (assistant)
- 2025: Giouchtas
- 2026: Chania (caretaker)
- * Club domestic league appearances and goals

Andreas Skentzos (Greek: Ανδρέας Σκέντζος; born 23 September 1972) is a Greek professional football manager and former player.
