= Kostas Chaniotakis =

Greek footballer (born 1968)

Personal information
- Full name: Konstantinos Chaniotakis
- Date of birth: 19 July 1968 (age 58)
- Place of birth: Heraklion, Greece
- Height: 1.86 m (6 ft 1 in)
- Position: Goalkeeper

Senior career*
| Years | Team | Apps | (Gls) |
| 1988–1998 | OFI | 228 | (0) |
| 1998–2000 | Vitesse | 3 | (0) |
| 2000–2001 | Paniliakos | 10 | (0) |
| 2001–2004 | OFI | 26 | (0) |
| 2004–2005 | Ergotelis | 23 | (0) |
| 2005–2006 | APOEL | 1 | (0) |
| 2006 | Ergotelis | 0 | (0) |

International career
| 1992–1993 | Greece | 4 | (0) |

Managerial career
- 2023–2026: Giouchtas (Goalkeeping coach)
- * Club domestic league appearances and goals

Kostas Chaniotakis (Greek: Κώστας Χανιωτάκης; born 19 July 1968) is a retired Greek footballer who played as a goalkeeper.

== Career ==
Chaniotakis moved to the first team at the age of 20 from OFI. After two years he became the first goalkeeper of the club, which he would also be the 8 seasons following. In 1992 and 1993 Chaniotakis came out four times for Greece.

After having played 228 matches for OFI, the keeper left for the Dutch Vitesse. On the advice of former Vitesse striker Nikos Machlas, the then 30-year-old Chaniotakis and also ex-teammate of Machlas was reached as an experienced stand-in for the first goalkeeper Sander Westerveld. On 29 September 1998, Chaniotakis made his debut for Vitesse in the UEFA Cup-match against the Greek team AEK Athens, because Westerveld was sent out of the field just before the whistle for the half time due to tackling a broken player.

After two seasons in the Netherlands, in which he would play only three games, he returned to his native country to play with the third divisionist Paniliakos. Chaniotakis returned to Crete, and OFI, where he spent another four season as a back-up goalkeeper. He then moved to fellow Heraklion-based Super League club Ergotelis, and following their relegation, signed with the Cypriot First Division club APOEL. At age 37, Chaniotakis postponed his retirement until the end of the season, in order to rejoin Ergotelis in the Beta Ethniki in January 2006, signed as both 4th goalkeeper and goalkeepers' coach.

== Statistics ==
| season | club | competition | caps | goals |
|---|---|---|---|---|
| 1988/89 | OFI | Alpha Ethniki | 18 | 0 |
| 1989/90 | OFI | Alpha Ethniki | 8 | 0 |
| 1990/91 | OFI | Alpha Ethniki | 26 | 0 |
| 1991/92 | OFI | Alpha Ethniki | 29 | 0 |
| 1992/93 | OFI | Alpha Ethniki | 28 | 0 |
| 1993/94 | OFI | Alpha Ethniki | 26 | 0 |
| 1994/95 | OFI | Alpha Ethniki | 0 | 0 |
| 1995/96 | OFI | Alpha Ethniki | 32 | 0 |
| 1996/97 | OFI | Alpha Ethniki | 32 | 0 |
| 1997/98 | OFI | Alpha Ethniki | 29 | 0 |
| 1998/99 | Vitesse | Eredivisie | 2 | 0 |
| 1999/00 | Vitesse | Eredivisie | 1 | 0 |
| 2000/01 | Paniliakos | Gamma Ethniki | 10 | 0 |
| 2001/02 | OFI | Alpha Ethniki | 6 | 0 |
| 2002/03 | OFI | Alpha Ethniki | 6 | 0 |
| 2003/04 | OFI | Alpha Ethniki | 14 | 0 |
| 2004/05 | Ergotelis | Alpha Ethniki | 23 | 0 |
| 2005/06 | APOEL | Cypriot First Division | 1 | 0 |
| 2005/06 | Ergotelis | Beta Ethniki | 0 | 0 |

== Personal life ==
Chaniotakis' son Georgios is also a goalkeeper. He currently plays for Gamma Ethniki side Ergotelis, where Chaniotakis himself played late in his career.
