= Béla Kovács (footballer) =

Hungarian footballer

Personal information
- Full name: Béla Kovács
- Date of birth: 30 March 1977 (age 49)
- Place of birth: Budapest, Hungary
- Height: 1.85 m (6 ft 1 in)
- Position: Midfielder

Youth career
- Csepel SC

Senior career*
Years	Team	Apps	(Gls)
1994–1998	Budapest Honvéd FC	88	(10)
1998–2000	Ferencvárosi TC	39	(4)
2000–2002	Budapest Honvéd FC	40	(4)
2002	Vaasan Palloseura	2	(0)
2003–2004	Békéscsaba 1912 Előre SE	30	(9)
2004–2005	Alki Larnaca	25	(5)
2005–2006	Ergotelis F.C.	17	(2)
2006–2007	Alki Larnaca	26	(6)
2007–2008	Nyíregyháza Spartacus	3	(1)
2008–2009	ASIL		

International career
1999	Hungary	1	(0)
- * Club domestic league appearances and goals

Béla Kovács (born 30 March 1977) is a Hungarian former footballer who played as a midfielder.
