= Georgi Markov (footballer) =

Bulgarian footballer

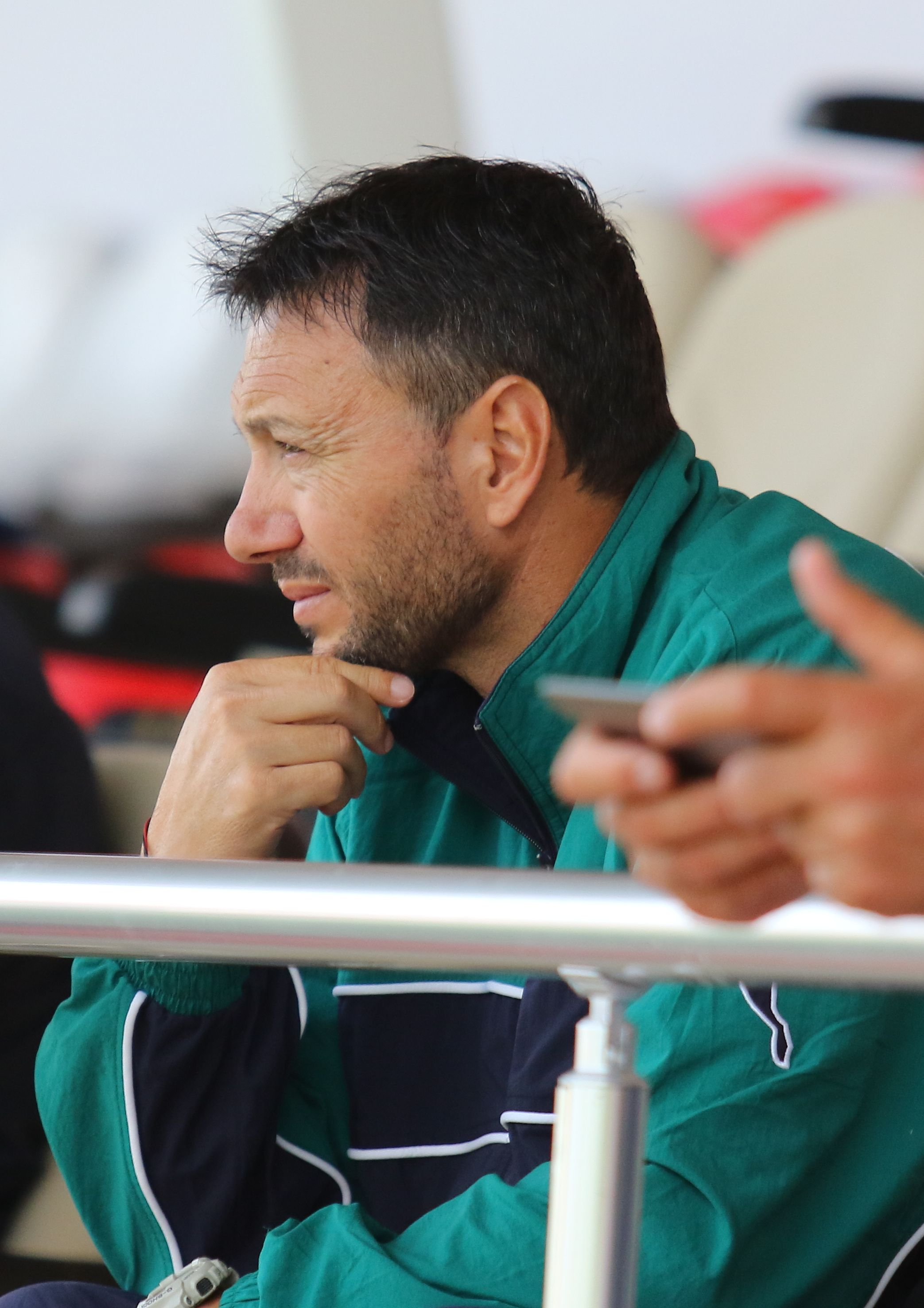

Personal information
- Full name: Georgi Slavev Markov
- Date of birth: 20 January 1972
- Place of birth: Gotse Delchev, Bulgaria
- Date of death: February 18, 2018 (aged 46)
- Place of death: Sofia, Bulgaria
- Height: 1.82 m (6 ft 0 in)
- Position: Centre back

Senior career*
Years	Team	Apps	(Gls)
1990–1993	Pirin GD		
1993–1996	Botev Plovdiv	65	(9)
1996–2000	Lokomotiv Sofia	89	(2)
2000–2003	Levski Sofia	58	(1)
2002	→ Trabzonspor (loan)	10	(0)
2003	Lokomotiv Sofia	13	(2)
2004–2005	Levski Sofia	31	(0)
2005–2006	Ergotelis	25	(4)
2006–2010	Lokomotiv Sofia	89	(2)
Total		377	(20)

International career
1999–2005	Bulgaria	36	(1)
- * Club domestic league appearances and goals

Georgi Slavev Markov (Bulgarian: Георги Славев Марков; 20 January 1972 – 18 February 2018) was a Bulgarian footballer who played as a defender. He was known as a tough, but generally fair tackler, and was nicknamed the "Börner Grater".

== Career ==
Markov was born in Gotse Delchev, near the border with Greece. His career began at the local club Pirin, but he was only 21 when he moved to the very successful Bulgarian club Botev Plovdiv. He played for Botev in the Bulgarian A PFG between 1993 and 1996.

In June 1996 Georgi moved to Lokomotiv Sofia. After that he played for Levski Sofia, Turkish Trabzonspor and Greek side Ergotelis. Signed again with Lokomotiv Sofia in 2006.

Between 1999 and 2005, Georgi Markov played in 36 matches for Bulgaria. He scored his only goal for Bulgaria on 9 June 1999 in the 1:1 home draw against England in a Euro 2000 qualifier.

On 2 July 2011, he played in an exhibition match for Loko Sofia against his former club Levski Sofia, which marked the end of his professional career.

=== International goal ===
#	Date	Venue	Opponent	Score	Result	Competition
1	9 June 1999	Bulgarian Army Stadium, Sofia, Bulgaria	England	1 – 1	1–1	Euro 2000 qualifier

== Honours ==
Levski Sofia

- Bulgarian League (2): 2000–01, 2001–02
- Bulgarian Cup (3): 2001–02, 2002–03, 2004–05

== Health problems and death ==
In 2015 Markov suffered a heart attack whilst in Antalya on a training camp with Lokomotiv Sofia. On 18 February 2018, he died at his home aged 46 from a second heart attack.
