= Paschalis Melissas =

Greek footballer and manager

Personal information
- Date of birth: 9 March 1982 (age 44)
- Place of birth: Xanthi, Greece
- Height: 1.88 m (6 ft 2 in)
- Position: Left-back

Youth career
- -2000: Orfeas Xanthi

Senior career*
| Years | Team | Apps | (Gls) |
| 2000–2001 | Kalamata | | |
| 2001–2002 | Messiniakos | | |
| 2002–2003 | Apollon Paralimniou | | |
| 2004–2006 | Skoda Xanthi | 24 | (1) |
| 2006–2007 | → Ergotelis (loan) | 36 | (2) |
| 2007–2008 | Ergotelis | 20 | (2) |
| 2008–2011 | Atromitos | 69 | (6) |
| 2011–2012 | Levadiakos | 20 | (2) |
| 2012 (B) | AEP Paphos | 12 | (1) |
| 2013–2014 | Panetolikos | 40 | (5) |
| 2014–2015 | AEL | 20 | (0) |
| 2015–2016 | Aris | 22 | (1) |

Managerial career
- 2016–2019: Aris U19 (director youth teams)
- * Club domestic league appearances and goals as of 30 August 2024

Paschalis Melissas (Greek: Πασχάλης Μελισσάς; born 9 March 1982) is a Greek former professional footballer who played as a left-back.

== Career ==
Born in Xanthi, Melissas began playing football with local side Skoda Xanthi in the Greek Super League.
