= Zsolt Posza =

Hungarian footballer

Personal information
- Full name: Zsolt Posza
- Date of birth: 11 May 1977 (age 49)
- Place of birth: Lengyeltóti, Hungary
- Height: 1.87 m (6 ft 2 in)
- Position: Goalkeeper

Team information
- Current team: Kaposvár
- Number: 30

Senior career*
Years	Team	Apps	(Gls)
1994–1999	Siófok	112	(0)
1999–2001	Győr	65	(0)
2001–2003	Újpest	38	(0)
2003–2005	Vasas	60	(0)
2005–2010	Ergotelis	78	(0)
2010–2011	Doxa Katokopia	17	(0)
2011	Balatonlelle	13	(0)
2011–	Kaposvár	8	(0)

International career^{‡}
1996–2000	Hungary U-21	10	(0)
2004	Hungary	1	(0)
- * Club domestic league appearances and goals as of 24 November 2013 ‡ National team caps and goals as of 19 June 2008

Zsolt Posza (born 11 May 1977 in Hungary) is a Hungarian football player. He last played in Cyprus for Doxa Katokopia as a goalkeeper. Who currently plays for Kaposvári Rákóczi FC.
