= Stefanos Voskaridis =

Cypriot footballer (born 1980)

Stefanos Voskarides
Personal information
- Full name: Stefanos Voskarides
- Date of birth: 1 February 1980 (age 46)
- Place of birth: Paphos, Cyprus
- Height: 1.75 m (5 ft 9 in)
- Position: Striker

Senior career*
Years	Team	Apps	(Gls)
1996–1999	Apollon Limassol	49	(2)
1999–2004	PAOK	36	(2)
2004–2005	Ergotelis	24	(1)
2005–2006	Veria	22	(1)
2006–2008	Kallithea	43	(9)
2008–2009	Anorthosis Famagusta	0	(0)
2009	→ Enosis Neon Paralimni (on loan)	10	(0)
2009–2010	Nea Salamis Famagusta	20	(3)
2010–2013	AEP Paphos	22	(1)

Managerial career
- 2013–2014: AEP Paphos (Director of football)
- 2014–2015: Aris Limassol (Director of football)
- 2015–2017: Digenis Morphou (assistant manager)
- 2017: Digenis Morphou
- 2017–: Othellos Athienou (assistant manager)
- * Club domestic league appearances and goals as of 17 July 2009

Stefanos Voskarides (Greek: Στέφανος Βοσκαρίδης; born 1 February 1980) is a Cypriot retired football striker. Now he serves as assistant coach and board advisor at Cypriot Second Division club Othellos Athienou.

== Career ==
Born in Paphos, Cyprus, Voskarides began playing football for Cypriot side Evagoras Paphos in 1996–1997. Moreover, from 1997 to 1999 Voskarides was playing for Apollon Limassol. The year 1999, he was acquired by Greek Alpha Ethniki side PAOK. He stayed with the club until 2004, twice winning the Greek Football Cup in 2001 and 2003. Voskarides left PAOK and signed with fellow, newly promoted Alpha Ethniki side Ergotelis. At the end of the season continued his career in the Beta Ethniki, the second tier of the Greek football league system, featuring for Veria and Kallithea until he returned to Cyprus in the summer of 2008, signing a contract with Anorthosis Famagusta.

During the calendar year 2008-2009 Anorthosis was participate at the Champions League group stage. In the summer of 2009, he signed with Nea Salamis Famagusta. He then moved to AEP Paphos in 2010, where he played until announcing his retirement as a professional football player

After his football career ended, Voskarides he was "active" in the sport he loved so much. Immediately has been hired as sport director of Cypriot clubs Pafos FC. Then, the next summer (July 2013) Aris Limassol offered a job to Voskarides as a sport director. During his presence at ARIS he successfully managed to keep the team in the first category with a much lower budget. By October 2015 Voskarides was hired from Digenis Morfou as a coach assistant. He stayed at this position for 2 consecutive seasons. Then he became a head coach at the same team. From December 2017 until today he serves as Assistant coach and board advisor at Othellos F.C.

== Honours ==
- 2000-2001: Winner of the Greek football Cup with PAOK Thessalonikis
- 2002-2003: Winner of the Greek football Cup with PAOK Thessalonikis
- 2008-2009: Participate at the Champions League group stage with Anorthosis Famagusta
- 2015: Manages to close the deal between KEP & Cyprus national team as a main sponsor.

=== Club ===
PAOK

- Greek Football Cup: 2000–01, 2002–03
