= Dragan Načevski =

Macedonian footballer

Personal information
- Full name: Dragan Načevski; Драган Начевски
- Date of birth: 27 January 1980 (age 46)
- Place of birth: Skopje, SFR Yugoslavia
- Height: 1.86 m (6 ft 1 in)
- Position: Winger

Youth career
- FK Vardar

Senior career*
Years	Team	Apps	(Gls)
1998–2005	Vardar	159	(31)
2004–2005	Madžari Solidarnost	15	(2)
2005–2008	Ergotelis	68	(10)
2008–2009	Kerkyra	20	(4)
2009	FK Baku	19	(4)
2009–2011	Ilioupoli	44	(5)
2011–2012	Metalurg Skopje	49	(12)
2012–2015	Teteks	50	(1)
2016–2017	Akademija Pandev	23+	(4+)

International career^{‡}
2001–2003	Macedonia	14	(1)
- * Club domestic league appearances and goals as of 14 December 2012 ‡ National team caps and goals as of 20 September 2012

Dragan Načevski (Macedonian: Драган Начевски) (born 27 January 1980) is a Macedonian retired football striker.

== Clubs ==
- 1998–2004: FK Vardar
- 2004–2005: FK Madžari Solidarnost
- 2005–2008: Ergotelis
- 2008–2009: Kerkyra
- 2009: FK Baku
- 2009–2011: Ilioupoli
- 2011–2012: FK Metalurg Skopje
- 2012–2015: FK Teteks
- 2016–2017: Akademija Pandev

== International career ==
He made his senior debut for Macedonia in a February 2001 friendly match against the Czech Republic and has earned a total of 14 caps, scoring 1 goal. His final international was an October 2002 European Championship qualification match against Turkey.
