= Lars Schlichting =

German footballer (born 1982)

Personal information
- Full name: Stavros Lars Schlichting
- Date of birth: 14 September 1982 (age 44)
- Place of birth: Lübeck, West Germany
- Height: 1.74 m (5 ft 9 in)
- Position: Midfielder

Youth career
- –1998: VfB Lübeck
- 1998–1999: Hamburger SV

Senior career*
Years	Team	Apps	(Gls)
1999–2002	Eichholzer SV	24	(0)
2002–2003	AO Tymbaki		
2003–2005	Ergotelis	10	(0)
2005–2012	Ethnikos Achna	57	(1)
2013–2015	SpVgg 05 Oberrad	3	(0)
- * Club domestic league appearances and goals

Lars Schlichting (born 14 September 1982) is a German former professional footballer who played as a midfielder.

== Career ==
Born in Lübeck, West Germany, Schlichting began his career in the youth teams of his local club VfB Lübeck, before being acquired by Hamburger SV in 1998 and featuring for their U-19 squad. He then moved to Hamburg-based club Eichholzer SV, playing in the Oberliga Hamburg for three years.

In 2002 Schlichting moved to Crete, Greece to play for local club AO Tymbaki. His breakthrough came in June 2004, when he was acquired by fellow Cretan Alpha Ethniki newcomers Ergotelis. He made a total of ten appearances in the 2004−05 season in both the Alpha Ethniki and Greek Football Cup, as the club was relegated to the Beta Ethniki at the end of the season. As Cypriot First Division club Ethnikos Achna showed interest in acquiring the player, Schlichting's contract with Ergotelis was renewed for another year in the summer of 2005, leading to a transfer move by the Cypriot club in August 2005 for a reported €50,000. Schlichting stayed at Ethnikos Achna for seven years, playing his first European games during the 2006–07 UEFA Cup and 2008 UEFA Intertoto Cup. He was released from the club in 2012, when he decided to take a temporary break in his career and return to Germany. He signed his final contract with SpVgg 05 Oberrad in 2013 and decided to retire from professional football in 2015.

He now works as a personal trainer in Frankfurt, Germany.
