= Rune Hagen =

Norwegian footballer (born 1975)

Personal information
- Full name: Rune Bjørnstad Hagen
- Date of birth: 20 July 1975 (age 51)
- Place of birth: Veme, Norway
- Height: 1.79 m (5 ft 10 1/2 in)

Senior career*
Years	Team	Apps	(Gls)
1992	Jevnaker		
1993–1996	Liv/Fossekallen	61	(22)
1996	Start	7	(2)
1997–1999	Strømsgodset	85	(13)
2000–2001	Vålerenga	30	(8)
2002–2004	Strømsgodset	78	(15)
2005	Herfølge	13	(0)
2005–2006	Ergotelis		
2007–2008	Hønefoss	14	(0)
2008	Modum		
2012	Nybergsund	4	
2014	Modum		
- * Club domestic league appearances and goals

Rune Hagen (born 20 July 1975) is a Norwegian former footballer who played as a left midfielder. He had 3 appearances for the Norwegian U-23 national team in 1998.

== Playing career ==
=== Norway ===
Hagen's career started with Jevnaker in 1992, as 17-year-old.

The following three seasons he scored 28 goals in 68 games for Norwegian side Liv/Fossekallen (now known as Hønefoss), followed by a short spell at Start.

He made a total of seven appearances for the Kristiansand club, including his debut against Brann on 25 August 1996, scoring two goals (against Moss and Skeid), before moving on by the end of the season as Start was relegated.

Hagen then joined Strømsgodset, where he scored 28 goals in 163 domestic league games, only interrupted by two seasons for Oslo club Vålerenga who he made 8 goals in 30 domestic league games for.

=== Denmark and Greece ===
His next move, to Danish side Herfølge during the winter of 2005, was controversial. Hagen could not prevent Herfølge being relegated to the Danish 1st Division, and he used a clause in the contract to leave the club after only 13 games.

He joined Ergotelis in the summer of 2005, helping them earn promotion to Super League Greece. After one season for the Crete-based team he was released as a free agent in May 2006, and was supposed to join USL First Division team Carolina RailHawks in time for the 2007 season on a 2-year Bosman-contract, but failed to pass the medical test.

=== Back to Norway ===
11 years after his move from Hønefoss (Liv/Fossekallen) he returned to his former club in July 2007. When the contract expired on 15 July 2008, he moved on to Cypriot club ASIL Lysi but a contract was never signed. According to himself because he was uncertain about the club's financial situation. On 31 August 2008, he agreed to play at Norwegian Second Division side Modum until the end of the 2008 season. The club was relegated that year.

In 2012, he signed for Nybergsund to help them win promotion from the 2012 Norwegian Second Division. The effort was fruitless as he only played four games before sustaining injury, and the club was not promoted.

== Personal life ==
His twin brother Erik Hagen played for the Norway national football team.
