= Manolis Patemtzis =

Greek footballer

Personal information
- Date of birth: 22 April 1964 (age 62)
- Place of birth: Heraklion, Greece
- Position: Defender

Senior career*
Years	Team	Apps	(Gls)
–1987	Irodotos		
1987–1997	OFI		
1997–1998	Olympiacos Volos		

Managerial career
- 2004: Irodotos
- 2004–2006: Ergotelis
- 2009–2015: Atsaleniou
- 2017: Ermis Zoniana
- 2018–: OFI (youth)
- * Club domestic league appearances and goals

Manolis Patemtzis (Greek: Μανώλης Πατεμτζής; born 22 April 1964) is a retired Greek football defender and later manager.
