= Cretan derby =

Association football rivalry in Greece

Cretan Derby Το Κρητικό ντέρμπι
- Other names: Heraklion Derby; Ηρακλειώτικο ντέρμπι The Battle of Crete; Η Μάχη της Κρήτης
- Location: Heraklion, Crete, Greece
- Teams: OFI; Ergotelis F.C.
- First meeting: 18 August 1929 (friendly); Ergotelis 1–0 OFI
- Latest meeting: 27 January 2019; Greek Football Cup; OFI 1–1 Ergotelis (4-3 pens)
- Next meeting: TBD
- Stadiums: Pankritio Stadium (Ergotelis), Theodoros Vardinogiannis Stadium (OFI)

Statistics
- Total meetings: Official matches: 25 (since 2004)
- Most wins: OFI (11)
- Top scorer: TBD
- Largest victory: 2005–06 Super League; OFI 4–0 Ergotelis

OFI	Ergotelis F.C.

The Cretan derby (Greek: Το Κρητικό Ντέρμπι), also called Heraklion Derby (Greek: Ηρακλειώτικο ντέρμπι) or The Battle of Crete (Greek: Η Μάχη της Κρήτης), is an association football rivalry between Ergotelis and OFI, two teams from Heraklion, Crete. Historically, the derby has been the most iconic football rivalry on the island, as both clubs were the most prestigious representatives of Crete in the Greek Super League.

In recent years, however, the rivalry has been affected by Ergotelis's relegation. After several seasons in the lower tiers of Greek football, Ergotelis officially withdrew from national leagues in 2022 and began competing in the A1 EPSI, the fourth football tier and top local division in Heraklion. The club's decision to step back and focus on youth development has widened the gap between them and OFI, who remain in the Super League. As a result, the Cretan derby no longer holds the same competitive significance, with the two clubs now playing in vastly different leagues. The most recent Cretan derby was in 2019, when Ergotelis eliminated OFI in the Greek Football Cup. Both games ended in 1–1 ties, with Ergotelis eventually qualifying by winning 4–3 in the penalty shootout. Since then, the clubs have not met in official competitions due to their different standings.

== History ==
=== Social rivalry ===
Socially, Ergotelis and OFI have historically represented different demographics within Heraklion. Ergotelis primarily represented the upper middle class, while OFI attracted supporters from working-class areas. The two clubs were established nearly simultaneously in the 1920s, with OFI being founded in 1925 and Ergotelis following in 1929. Over the years, the rivalry has intensified, particularly in the 1960s, when matches between the two were considered major social events in Heraklion.

=== The Junta incident ===
The tension between the two clubs was further fueled during the Greek military junta. Following the 1966–67 season of the Greek Second National Division (Beta Ethniki), Ergotelis was relegated to amateur status due to a new law that limited the number of professional football clubs per city. Five of Ergotelis' key players were transferred to OFI, and Ergotelis fans have long attributed this incident to political interference by the junta, which they claim favored OFI. The rivalry remains deeply rooted in Heraklion's football culture today.

=== Football rivalry ===
While OFI has been historically more successful, achieving promotion to the Super League in 1968 and remaining there for most of the next three decades, Ergotelis lingered in the lower divisions until their resurgence in the early 2000s. Ergotelis earned their first promotion to the Super League in 2004, marking a new chapter in the rivalry.

=== Recent Decline of Ergotelis and its Effect on the Derby ===
Ergotelis’s withdrawal from the national leagues in 2022 marked a significant shift in the rivalry. The two teams, once fierce competitors in both local and national competitions, no longer compete at the same level. The last official derby match occurred in 2019 during the Greek Football Cup, and with Ergotelis now focused on rebuilding through youth development in the local leagues, it is unlikely the two sides will face each other again in the near future.

This shift has made the Cretan derby more of a symbolic rivalry than a competitive one, as OFI continues to perform in the top tier of Greek football while Ergotelis rebuilds in the amateur leagues. The rivalry, however, remains a key part of Cretan football history.

== Head-to-Head Record ==
The Cretan Derby between OFI and Ergotelis is steeped in history, with matches dating back to the late 1920s when the clubs were first established. The very first recorded match, a friendly on 18 August 1929, saw Ergotelis leading 1–0 against OFI, but the game was interrupted in the 35th minute due to a brawl between players from both teams.

Below is a detailed breakdown of their head-to-head encounters from 2004 onwards, reflecting the modern era of their rivalry:

Head-to-Head Statistic	Data
OFI Wins	11
Ergotelis Wins	6
Draws	8
Total Goals Scored (OFI)	42
Total Goals Scored (Ergotelis)	32

=== Full Match Results (2004–2021) ===
Date	Competition	Home team	Result	Away team
2020/09/06	INT CF	OFI	0–2	Ergotelis
2019/08/18	INT CF	OFI	2–2	Ergotelis
2019/01/24	Greek Cup	OFI	1–1 (3-4 pens)	Ergotelis
2019/01/09	Greek Cup	Ergotelis	1–1	OFI
2018/08/19	INT CF	OFI	2–1	Ergotelis
2018/03/24	Super League 2	OFI	4–2	Ergotelis
2017/12/04	Super League 2	Ergotelis	2–4	OFI
2015/02/07	Super League	Ergotelis	3–2	OFI
2014/12/05	Super League	OFI	1–0	Ergotelis
2014/02/18	Super League	Ergotelis	0–1	OFI
2013/10/20	Super League	OFI	1–1	Ergotelis
2012/05/09	INT CF	OFI	3–4	Ergotelis
2012/09/09	INT CF	OFI	2–2	Ergotelis
2012/02/04	Super League	Ergotelis	0–1	OFI
2011/10/02	Super League	OFI	1–0	Ergotelis
2009/04/13	Super League	OFI	0–0	Ergotelis
2008/12/15	Super League	Ergotelis	1–3	OFI
2008/01/27	Super League	Ergotelis	1–1	OFI
2007/10/01	Super League	OFI	4–1	Ergotelis
2007/02/04	Super League	OFI	1–3	Ergotelis
2006/09/24	Super League	Ergotelis	2–0	OFI
2005/04/03	Super League	Ergotelis	0–1	OFI
2004/11/27	Super League	OFI	5–0	Ergotelis

== Honours Comparison ==
Major Honours won
Competition	Ergotelis	OFI
Super League Greece	0	0
Greek Football Cup	0	2 (1987, 2026)
Total	0	2

...
