= Lucian Pârvu =

Romanian footballer

Personal information
- Date of birth: 14 June 1982 (age 44)
- Place of birth: Craiova, Romania
- Height: 1.82 m (5 ft 11 1/2 in)
- Positions: Right winger; second striker

Senior career*
| Years | Team | Apps | (Gls) |
| 2001–2003 | Extensiv Craiova | 24 | (6) |
| 2003–2006 | Ergotelis | 41 | (1) |
| 2006–2008 | FC U Craiova | 27 | (3) |
| 2008 | → Gloria Bistrița (loan) | 6 | (1) |
| 2008 | Farul Constanța | 8 | (1) |
| 2009 | Pandurii Târgu Jiu | 5 | (0) |
| 2009 | Jiul Petroșani | 10 | (1) |
| 2009–2010 | Râmnicu Vâlcea | 21 | (6) |
| 2010–2011 | Otopeni | 25 | (8) |
| 2011–2012 | Doxa Katokopias | 0 | (0) |
| 2012–2013 | Otopeni | 22 | (5) |
| 2013–2014 | Chindia Târgoviște | | |
| 2014–2015 | Gloria Buzău | 8 | (0) |
| 2015 | Podari | | |
| Total | | 197 | (32) |
- * Club domestic league appearances and goals as of 17 July 2018

Lucian Pârvu (born 14 June 1982 in Craiova) is a Romanian former footballer.
